= Eels discography =

- Studio albums: 20
- Extended plays: 2
- Live albums: 8
- Compilation albums: 5
- Singles: 17
- Video albums: 4
- Music videos: 34

This is a discography of Eels and other musical projects of Mark Oliver Everett, such as MC Honky.

== Albums ==
=== Studio albums ===
Title	Album details	Peak chart positions												Notes
Title	Album details	US	AUS	AUT	BEL	FRA	GER	IRL	NLD	NOR	SWE	SWI	UK	Notes
Bad Dude in Love	Released: 1985; Label: Joe Mama	—	—	—	—	—	—	—	—	—	—	—	—	First release from Mark Everett, recorded and released independently
A Man Called E	Released: February 2, 1992; Label: Polydor	—	—	—	—	—	—	—	—	—	—	—	—	E solo album
Broken Toy Shop	Released: December 7, 1993; Label: Polydor	—	—	—	—	—	—	—	—	—	—	—	—	E solo album
Beautiful Freak	Released: August 13, 1996; Label: DreamWorks	114	71	—	19	17	—	—	32	—	—	—	5	eels band consisted of E Mark Oliver Everett, Butch Norton, and Tommy Walter
Electro-Shock Blues	Released: September 21, 1998; Label: DreamWorks	—	—	—	4	24	59	—	50	36	56	—	12	eels consisted of E Mark Oliver Everett and Butch Norton. Album featured Jon Brion, T-Bone Burnett, Lisa Germano, and Grant-Lee Phillips
Daisies of the Galaxy	Released: March 14, 2000; Label: DreamWorks	—	38	—	8	40	49	24	34	21	—	69	8	eels consisted of E Mark Oliver Everett and Butch Norton. Album featured Peter Buck, and Michael Simpson
Souljacker	Released: September 19, 2001; Label: DreamWorks	—	39	34	15	34	47	19	56	36	—	75	12	eels consisted of E Mark Oliver Everett and Butch Norton. Album featured Kelly Logsdon, John Parish, and Adam Siegel.
I Am the Messiah	Released: November 4, 2002; Label: SpinART	—	—	—	—	—	—	—	—	—	—	—	—	MC Honky album featuring Logsdon, Butch Norton, and Joey Waronker
Levity	Released: March 22, 2003; Label: Plexi Music	—	—	—	—	—	—	—	—	—	—	—	—	Mark Oliver Everett solo score to the film Levity, including two songs credited to eels.
Shootenanny!	Released: June 3, 2003; Label: DreamWorks	145	38	—	14	58	56	44	58	—	—	54	35	eels consisted of E Mark Oliver Everett and Butch Norton. Album featured Lisa Germano, Scott Gordon, Joe Gore, James King, Kelly Logsdon, and Todd Simon.
Blinking Lights and Other Revelations	Released: April 26, 2005; Label: Vagrant	93	42	32	7	38	30	11	18	26	—	18	16	eels consisted of E Mark Oliver Everett. Album included Wayne Bergeron, Bobby, Jr., Buck, Wally Gagel, Ludvig Girdland, Gore, Probyn Gregory, Darren Hahn, David Hlebo, Jim Jacobsen, Jim Lang, Bill Liston, Jeff Lyster, Andy Martin, Joe Meyer, Dick Mitchell, Butch Norton, John Sebastian, Simon, Gerri Sutyak, Michael Valerio, Tom Waits, and Stuart Wylen.
Hombre Lobo	Released: June 2, 2009; Label: Vagrant	43	35	42	1	59	20	24	37	—	—	10	18	eels include E Mark Oliver Everett, Derek "Knuckles" Brown, and Kelly "Koool G Murder" Logsdon
End Times	Released: January 19, 2010; Label: Vagrant	66	48	33	2	74	29	13	19	—	—	10	21	eels consisted of E Mark Oliver Everett. Album included Wayne Bergeron, Chris Bleth, Butch Norton, E Mark Oliver Everett, Jim Lang, Kelly "Koool G Murder" Logsdonn, and Andy Martin.
Tomorrow Morning	Released: August 17, 2010; Label: Vagrant	83	80	18	1	61	12	9	10	34	—	9	18	eels consisted of E Mark Oliver Everett.
Wonderful, Glorious	Released: February 5, 2013; Label: Vagrant	74	—	18	1	89	19	15	11	—	—	4	14	
The Cautionary Tales of Mark Oliver Everett	Released: April 21, 2014; Label: E Works	96	—	14	2	21	10	8	8	—	—	5	7	
The Deconstruction	Released: April 6, 2018; Label: E Works/PIAS	—	—	6	1	19	4	—	16	—	—	5	10	
Earth to Dora	Released: October 30, 2020; Label: E Works/PIAS	—	—	18	4	73	18	—	23	—	—	18	37	
Extreme Witchcraft	Released: January 28, 2022; Label: E Works/PIAS	—	—	14	4	49	7	—	14	—	—	7	37	
Eels Time!	Released: June 7, 2024; Label: E Works/PIAS	—	—	17	16	—	24	—	—	—	—	18	—	
Cookie Happened	Released: October 16, 2026; Label: E Works/PIAS	—	—	50	7	100	41	—	92	—	—	10	—	
"—" denotes a recording that did not chart or was not released in that territory.

=== Live albums ===
Title	Album details	Peak chart positions					Notes
Title	Album details	US	BEL	FRA	NLD	UK	Notes
Oh What a Beautiful Morning	Released: December 2000; Label: EWorks	—	—	—	—	—	Recorded throughout 2000, with Balaban, Crum, Germano, Gregory, Hlebo, and Norton
Electro-Shock Blues Show	Released: 2002; Label: EWorks	—	—	—	—	—	Recorded in 1998 with Norton and Siegel
Sixteen Tons (Ten Songs)	Released: May 10, 2005; Label: EWorks	—	—	—	—	—	Recorded in 2003 with Hahn, Logsdon, and Shon Sullivan.
Eels with Strings: Live at Town Hall	Released: February 21, 2006; Label: Vagrant Records	—	23	114	57	82	Recorded on June 30, 2005 in New York City with Julie Carpenter, Allen Hunter, Ana Lenchantin, Heather Lockie, Lyster, and Paloma Udovic, also released as a DVD.
Live and in Person! London 2006	Released: February 14, 2008; Label: EWorks	93	—	—	—	—	Recorded on June 23 and 27, 2006 at the London Astoria in London, United Kingdom with Hunter, Derek Brown, and Lyster and a guest appearance by Smoosh. Also released with a DVD.
Tremendous Dynamite – Live in 2010 + 2011	Released: February 12, 2013; Label: EWorks	—	—	—	—	—	40 tracks recorded live on the EELS 2010 and 2011 world tours: 20 from a 2010 show and 20 from a 2011 show—both shows recorded at First Avenue in Minneapolis.
Live at Royal Albert Hall	Release date: April 14, 2015; Label: EWorks	—	—	—	—	40	Recorded on June 30, 2014 in London at the Royal Albert Hall. This release will be accompanied by a DVD of the show.
Live at Largo	Release date: 2023; Label: EWorks	—	—	—	—	—	Recorded in 2019 at the Largo in Los Angeles. Sold exclusively on the band's 2023 Lockdown Hurricane tour.
Gentle Souls: 2021 KCRW Sessions	Release date: 2023; Label: EWorks	—	—	—	—	—	Recorded in 2021 for KCRW. Sold exclusively on the band's 2023 Lockdown Hurricane tour.
"—" denotes a recording that did not chart or was not released in that territory.

=== Compilations ===
Title	Album details	Peak chart positions				Notes
Title	Album details	BEL	FRA	NLD	UK	Notes
B-Sides & Rarities 1996–2003	Released: March 5, 2005; Label: Interscope	—	—	—	—	iTunes Music Store-exclusive digital compilation
Meet The Eels: Essential Eels, Vol. 1 (1996–2006)	Released: January 15, 2008; Label: DreamWorks/Universal	13	—	—	26	Greatest-hits compilation, also includes Eels Video Collection DVD.
Useless Trinkets: B-Sides, Soundtracks, Rarities and Unreleased 1996–2006	Released: January 15, 2008; Label: DreamWorks/Universal	21	174	77	69	Rarities compilation, also includes Eels Lollapalooza 2006 DVD.
The Complete DreamWorks Albums	Released: October 30, 2015; Label: DreamWorks	—	—	—	—	Box set featuring Beautiful Freak, Electro-Shock Blues, Daisies of the Galaxy, Souljacker, Shootenanny!, and Electro-Shock Blues Show as a double live LP available exclusively for the first time on vinyl. The label also re-released all of the studio albums on vinyl at this time.
Eels So Good: Essential Eels, Vol. 2 (2007–2020)	Released: December 15, 2023; Label: EWorks Records	—	—	—	—	Greatest-hits compilation.
"—" denotes a recording that did not chart or was not released in that territory.

== Extended plays ==
Title	EP details
Not for Airplay	Released: December 1993; Label: Polydor
The Myspace Transmissions Session 2009	Released: August 2009; Label: EWorks

== Singles ==
Title	Year	Peak chart positions									Album
Title	Year	US Airplay	US Alt	AUS	CAN	IRE	NLD	BEL	NZL	UK	Album
"Hello Cruel World" (E solo)	1992	—	—	—	—	—	—	—	—	—	A Man Called (E)
"Nowheresville" (E solo)	1992	—	—	—	—	—	—	—	—	—	A Man Called (E)
"Novocaine for the Soul"	1996	39	1	84	76	—	90	—	—	10	Beautiful Freak
"Rags to Rags" (Note: released in Europe/Australia)	1996	—	—	—	—	—	—	—	—	—	Beautiful Freak
"Susan's House"	1997	—	—	—	—	—	99	—	—	9	Beautiful Freak
"Your Lucky Day in Hell"	1997	—	—	—	—	—	—	—	—	35	Beautiful Freak
"Beautiful Freak" (Note: released in the UK)	1997	—	—	—	—	—	—	—	—	—	Beautiful Freak
"Last Stop: This Town"	1998	—	40	—	—	—	96	—	—	23	Electro-Shock Blues
"Cancer for the Cure"	1998	—	—	—	—	—	—	—	—	60	Electro-Shock Blues
"Mr. E's Beautiful Blues"	2000	—	—	—	—	46	85	—	43	11	Daisies of the Galaxy
"Flyswatter"	2000	—	—	—	—	—	—	—	—	55	Daisies of the Galaxy
"Souljacker part I"	2001	—	—	—	—	—	—	—	—	30	Souljacker
"Hey Man (Now You're Really Living)"	2005	—	—	—	—	33	—	—	—	45	Blinking Lights and Other Revelations
"I Want to Protect You"	2006	—	—	—	—	—	—	—	—	—	Non-album single
"Fresh Blood" / "My Timing Is Off"	2009	—	—	—	—	—	—	53	—	—	Hombre Lobo
"That Look You Give That Guy"	2009	—	—	—	—	—	—	13	—	—	Hombre Lobo
"Spectacular Girl"	2010	—	—	—	—	—	—	—	—	—	Tomorrow Morning
"A Line in the Dirt"	2010	—	—	—	—	—	—	32	—	—	End Times
"Baby Let's Make It Real"/"Who You Say You Are"	2020	—	—	—	—	—	—	—	—	—	Earth to Dora

=== Promotional singles ===
- "Climbing to the Moon" (1998)
- "3 Speed" (1998)
- "Jeannie's Diary" (2000)
- "Fresh Feeling" (2001)
- "Rotten World Blues" (2000)
- "Saturday Morning" (2003)
- "Trouble with Dreams" (2005)

== Video albums ==
- Eels with Strings: Live at Town Hall (2006)
- Eels Video Collection (2008) (Part of the Meet the Eels: Essential Eels Vol. I compilation)
- Eels Lollapalooza 2006 (2008) (Part of the Useless Trinkets compilation)
- Live and in Person! London 2006 (released together with the CD) (2008)

== Music videos ==
Date	Song	Director
1992	"Hello Cruel World"	Mick Haggerty
1994	"The Only Thing I Care About"	Mark Lindquist
August, 1996	"Novocaine for the Soul"	Mark Romanek
1996	"Susan's House"	Jake Scott
February, 1997	"Rags to Rags"	Gary Weis
December, 1997	"Your Lucky Day in Hell" (x2 videos)	Jamie Caliri
October, 1998	Last Stop: This Town	Garth Jennings
February, 1999	"Cancer for the Cure"	Hammer & Tongs
May, 2000	"Mr. E's Beautiful Blues"	Marcos Siega
May, 2000	"Flyswatter"	Steve Hanft
March, 2002	"Souljacker part I"	Wim Wenders
May, 2003	"Saturday Morning"	Steve Hanft
May, 2005	"Hey Man (Now You're Really Living)"	E
September, 2005	"Trouble with Dreams"	Jesse Dylan
April 29, 2009	"Fresh Blood"	Jesse Dylan
May 14, 2009	"That Look You Give That Guy" (Version 1)	Gus Black
July 7, 2009	"Prizefighter"	Gus Black
July 7, 2009	"In My Dreams"	Howard Greenhalgh
September 9, 2009	"That Look You Give That Guy" (Version 2)	Gus Black
November 18, 2009	"Little Bird"	–
December 9, 2009	"In My Younger Days"	–
January 10, 2010	"End Times"	–
February 9, 2010	"Unhinged"	John Cannizzaro
July 22, 2010	"Spectacular Girl"	–
September 2, 2010	"Baby Loves Me"	Stephen Morris and Gillian Gilbert
2012	"Peach Blossom"	–
2013	"New Alphabet"	–
March 25, 2013	"Cold Dead Hand"	–
2013	"Kinda Fuzzy"	–
2014	"Lockdown Hurricane"	Andrew van Baal
2014	"Mistakes of My Youth"	Brian & Brad Palmer
2018	"Today Is the Day"	Gus Black
2018	"Bone Dry"	Sofia Astrom
2018	"Rusty Pipes"	Matthias Hoene
2020	"Are We Alright Again"	Greg Barnes

== Songs in film and television ==
Song	Year	Appearance
"Novocaine for the Soul"	1996	Dream for an Insomniac
"Not Ready Yet"	1996	Homicide: Life on the Street
"Your Lucky Day in Hell"	1997	Grosse Pointe Blank
"Bad News"	1997	The End of Violence
"Dog's Life"	1997	Welcome to Woop Woop
"Your Lucky Day in Hell"	1997	The Maker
"Your Lucky Day in Hell"	1997	Scream 2
"Your Lucky Day in Hell"	1998	Dead Man on Campus
"Cancer for the Cure"	1999	American Beauty
"Mr. E's Beautiful Blues"	2000	Road Trip
"Flyswatter"	2000	Chain of Fools
"Christmas Is Going to the Dogs"	2000	How the Grinch Stole Christmas
"Everything's Gonna Be Cool This Christmas"	2000	Roswell
"Ant Farm"	2001	Jump Tomorrow
"Mr. E's Beautiful Blues"	2001	Jump Tomorrow
"My Beloved Monster"	2001	Shrek
"Flyswatter"	2001	The Anniversary Party
"It's a Motherfucker"	2001	The Anniversary Party
"Souljacker Part I"	2002	Six Feet Under
"Skywriting"	2003	Levity
"Taking a Bath in Rust"	2003	Levity
"Mr. E's Beautiful Blues"	2003	A Guy Thing
"Jungle Telegraph"	2003	A Guy Thing
"That's Not Really Funny"	2003	Monkey Dust
"World of Shit"	2003	Monkey Dust
"Your Lucky Day in Hell"	2003	Monkey Dust
"Fresh Feeling"	2003	Scorched
"Fresh Feeling"	2003	Scrubs
"Rock Hard Times"	2003	Six Feet Under
"Mighty Fine Blues"	2003	Holes
"Eyes Down"	2003	Holes
"Novocaine for the Soul"	2003	Herr Lehmann
"The Sound of Fear"	2003	Herr Lehmann
"Mr. E's Beautiful Blues"	2004	Along Came Polly
"Mental"	2004	Mean Creek
"Novocaine for the Soul"	2004	Mean Creek
"Christmas Is Going to the Dogs"	2004	The O.C.
"Love of the Loveless"	2004	The O.C.
"Saturday Morning"	2004	The O.C.
"I Need Some Sleep"	2004	Shrek 2
"Mr. E's Beautiful Blues"	2005	Hating Alison Ashley
"Saturday Morning"	2005	Kicking & Screaming
"Last Stop: This Town"	2005	The Big White
"I Want to Protect You"	2005	The Big White
"Trouble with Dreams"	2005	The Big White
"Novocaine for the Soul"	2005	The Work of Director Mark Romanek
"I'm Going to Stop Pretending That I Didn't Break Your Heart"	2005	One Tree Hill
"Blinking Lights (For Me)"	2006	Tough Enough
"Fresh Feeling"	2006	Failure to Launch
"Living Life"	2006	Scrubs
"Saturday Morning"	2006	Wordplay
"Hey Man (Now You're Really Living)"	2006	Just My Luck
"Ant Farm"	2006	The Lake House
"Hey Man (Now You're Really Living)"	2006	Griffin and Phoenix
"I Write the B-Sides"	2006	I'll Believe You
"Blinking Lights (For You)"	2006	Big Nothing
"Love of the Loveless"	2006	Big Nothing
"Everything's Gonna Be Cool This Christmas"	2006	Unaccompanied Minors
"Souljacker Part I"	2007	Hot Fuzz
"Souljacker Part I"	2007	The Condemned
"Mr. E's Beautiful Blues"	2007	Charlie Bartlett
"Hey Man (Now You're Really Living)"	2007	Charlie Bartlett
"Royal Pain"	2007	Shrek the Third
"Losing Streak"	2007	Shrek the Third
"Packing Blankets"	2007	Coming Down the Mountain
"Fresh Feeling"	2007	Chuck
"P.S. You Rock My World"	2007	Cold Case
"The Stars Shine in the Sky Tonight"	2007	Shrek the Halls
"Love of the Loveless"	2008	Henry Poole Is Here
"Hey Man (Now You're Really Living)"	2008	What Happens in Vegas
"Beautiful Freak"	2008	Cure for Love
"Beautiful Freak"	2008	Hellboy II: The Golden Army
"To Lick Your Boots"	2008	Yes Man
"Bus Stop Boxer"	2008	Yes Man
"Your Lucky Day in Hell"	2008	Yes Man
"Eyes Down"	2008	Yes Man
"The Sound of Fear"	2008	Yes Man
"Blinking Lights (For Me)"	2008	Yes Man
"Theme from Blinking Lights"	2008	Yes Man
"Wooden Nickels"	2008	Yes Man
"The Good Old Days"	2008	Yes Man
"Animal"	2008	Yes Man
"Flyswatter"	2008	Yes Man
"Somebody Loves You"	2008	Yes Man
"Man Up"	2008	Yes Man
"Souljacker Part I"	2009	United States of Tara
"Love of the Loveless"	2009	United States of Tara
"Friendly Ghost"	2009	Being Human
"Numbered Days"	2009	Numbers
"Blinking Lights (For Me)"	2009	Bustin' Down the Door
"Fresh Feeling"	2009	Love Happens
"On My Feet"	2010	The Company Men
"Nowadays"	2010	The Company Men
"In My Dreams"	2010	Parenthood
"Last Stop: This Town"	2010	Happy Town
"Agony"	2010	Stargate Universe
"All the Beautiful Things"	2010	The Switch
"Numbered Days"	2010	The Switch
"Prizefighter"	2010	Going the Distance
"Fresh Blood"	2010	True Blood
"I Like Birds"	2010	Neue Vahr Süd
"Gone Man"	2010	Grey's Anatomy
"Ugly Love"	2010	¿Qué fue de Jorge Sanz?
"Christmas Is Going to the Dogs"	2010	Misfits
"I Like Birds"	2011	The Big Year
"Beginner's Luck"	2012	Winning Streak
"Calling for Your Love"	2012	Cirque du Soleil: Worlds Away 3D
"Beautiful Freak"	2013	My Mad Fat Diary
"Novocaine for the Soul"	2013	My Mad Fat Diary
"I Need Some Sleep"	2013	Mein Lover, sein Vater und ich!
"New Alphabet"	2013	Elementary
"Manchild"	2013	Futurama
"That Look You Give That Guy"	2013	Horns
"I Like the Way This Is Going"	2013	Enough Said
"Wonderful, Glorious"	2013	Delivery Man
"Mistakes of My Youth"	2014	Dumb and Dumber To
"Mental"	2014	My Mad Fat Diary
"Flower"	2014	My Mad Fat Diary
"Electro-Shock Blues"	2015	My Mad Fat Diary
"The Medication Is Wearing Off"	2015	My Mad Fat Diary
"The Turnaround"	2015	Der Lehrer
"Fresh Blood"	2015	The Jinx
"Electro-Shock Blues"	2015	The Ataxian
"Fresh Blood"	2015	Sneaky Pete
"Mistakes of My Youth"	2015	Fear the Walking Dead
"Theme from Blinking Lights"	2016	The Blacklist
"Trouble with Dreams"	2016	American Dad!

== Songs from compilations ==
Year	Song	Appearance
2007	"Last Stop: This Town", "Novocaine for the Soul", "Hospital Food"	The Bridge School Collection, Vol. 3 recorded live for the Bridge School Benefit October 17, 1998 ("Novocaine for the Soul" and "Hospital Food") and October 18, 1998 ("Last Stop: This Town") released exclusively on iTunes Store
2005	"Jelly Dancers"	Dimension Mix

== E Works ==
E Works is the vanity label set up exclusively to release Eels live albums. These self-released albums include Oh, What a Beautiful Morning (2000), Electro-Shock Blues Show (2002), Sixteen Tons (Ten Songs) (2005), and Live and in Person! London 2006 (2008). The band has only sold these albums at live shows and later online. The logo for E Works is a parody of that for DreamWorks' record label, who originally signed Eels.
