= The Complete DreamWorks Albums =

Box set by Eels
- Released: October 30, 2015
- Genre: Indie rock
- Length: 297:39
- Language: English
- Label: DreamWorks
- Producers: Jon Brion; E; Mark Goldenberg; Jim Jacobsen; John Parish; Mickey Petralia; Michael Simpson

Eels chronology
Live at Royal Albert Hall (2015)	The Complete DreamWorks Albums (2015)	The Deconstruction (2018)

The Complete DreamWorks Albums is a 2015 box set of seven albums from American indie rock band Eels, released in the 1990s and 2000s: Beautiful Freak (1996), Electro-Shock Blues (1998), Daisies of the Galaxy (2000), Souljacker (2001), Electro-Shock Blues Show (2002, recorded live in 1998), and Shootenanny! (2003). The collection has received positive reviews by critics.

== Reception ==
In Classic Rock, Rob Hughes gave this compilation 4 out of 5 stars, praising "songs that are funny, sad, slightly surreal and sometimes harrowing, with an uncommon eye for the most telling details, however small", but noting that the high price made this "for collectors only". At Louder Than War, Lee Hammond declared Eels "one of the great bands of our generation", stating that "this box set documents an incredible rise of one of the worlds [sic] most loved bands"; he rated this album an 8 out of 10. Writing for The Line of Best Fit, Alex Lee Thomson took the box set's release to assess the band's early career at large, calling Eels "one of humanity’s greatest offerings to history", noting how Eels never fit into mainstream rock radio and continuing that "there’s so much range to their music as a whole it’s like sticking a pin in a map that expands in every direction from wherever you plot it", ending that this run of works in particular are "miraculous".

== Track listing ==
All tracks written by E, except as noted.

Beautiful Freak

1. "Novocaine for the Soul" (E and Mark Goldenberg) – 3:08
2. "Susan's House" (E, Jim Jacobsen, and Jim Weatherly) – 3:43
3. "Rags to Rags" – 3:53
4. "Beautiful Freak" - 3:34
5. "Not Ready Yet" (Jon Brion and E) – 4:46
6. "My Beloved Monster" – 2:13
7. "Flower" (E and Jacobsen) – 3:38
8. "Guest List" – 3:13
9. "Mental" – 4:01
10. "Spunky" – 3:11
11. "Your Lucky Day in Hell" (E and Goldenberg) – 4:28
12. "Manchild" (E and Jill Sobule) – 4:05

Electro-Shock Blues

1. "Elizabeth on the Bathroom Floor" – 2:08
2. "Going to Your Funeral Part I" (E, Jim Jacobsen, and Parthenon Huxley) – 2:37
3. "Cancer for the Cure" (E and Mickey Petralia) – 4:46
4. "My Descent Into Madness" (E, Paul Houston, Dan Nakamura, and Michael Simpson) – 3:54
5. "3 Speed" – 2:45
6. "Hospital Food" (Butch, E, and Jim Lang) – 3:23
7. "Electro-Shock Blues" (E and Petralia) – 2:29
8. "Efils' God" (E and Simpson) – 3:19
9. "Going to Your Funeral Part II" (E, Jacobsen) – 1:30
10. "Last Stop: This Town" (E and Simpson) – 3:27
11. "Baby Genius" (E and Lang) – 2:04
12. "Climbing to the Moon" – 3:38
13. "Ant Farm" – 2:11
14. "Dead of Winter" – 2:59
15. "The Medication Is Wearing Off" (E and Petralia) – 3:51
16. "P.S. You Rock My World" – 3:08

Daisies of the Galaxy

1. "Grace Kelly Blues" – 3:38
2. "Packing Blankets" – 2:07
3. "The Sound of Fear" – 3:33
4. "I Like Birds" – 2:35
5. "Daisies of the Galaxy" – 3:27
6. "Flyswatter" – 3:20
7. "It's a Motherfucker" – 2:14
8. "Estate Sale" (E and Peter Buck) – 1:36
9. "Tiger in My Tank" – 3:07
10. "A Daisy Through Concrete" – 2:26
11. "Jeannie's Diary" – 3:37
12. "Wooden Nickels" – 2:55
13. "Something Is Sacred" – 2:52
14. "Selective Memory" – 2:44
15. "Mr. E's Beautiful Blues" (E and Michael Simpson) – 3:58

Souljacker

1. "Dog Faced Boy" (E, John Parish) – 3:17
2. "That's Not Really Funny" (E, Parish) – 3:19
3. "Fresh Feeling" (E, Koool G Murder) – 3:37
4. "Woman Driving, Man Sleeping" (E, Parish) – 3:30
5. "Souljacker Part I" (Butch, E, Adam Siegel) – 3:15
6. "Friendly Ghost" – 3:22
7. "Teenage Witch" (E, Parish) – 4:44
8. "Bus Stop Boxer" (E, Parish) – 3:42
9. "Jungle Telegraph" – 3:39
10. "World of Shit" (E, Parish) – 3:29
11. "Souljacker Part II" – 1:58
12. "What Is This Note?" (E, Parish) – 2:28

Electro-Shock Blues Show

1. "Cancer for the Cure" (E, Mickey Petralia) – 5:16
2. "Fingertips Part III" (Paul Clarence, Henry Cosby) – 1:20
3. "Going to Your Funeral Part I" (E, Parthenon Huxley, Jim Jacobsen) – 3:14
4. "Efil's God" (E, Mike Simpson) – 3:10
5. "Souljacker part I" (Butch, E, Adam Siegel) – 4:30
6. "My Beloved Monster" – 2:32
7. "Novocaine for the Soul" (E, Mark Goldenberg) – 4:22
8. "Not Ready Yet" (Jon Brion, E) – 12:58
9. "Last Stop: This Town" (E, Mike Simpson) – 2:52
10. "Everything's Gonna Be Cool This Christmas" – 3:00
11. "Flower" (E, Jim Jacobsen) – 3:26
12. "Dead of Winter" – 3:21
13. "Electro-Shock Blues" (E, Petralia) – 3:35
14. "The Medication Is Wearing Off" (E, Petralia) – 4:14
15. "Climbing to the Moon"/"My Beloved Monster"/"My Girl" (E/E/Smokey Robinson, Ronald White) – 15:05

Shootenanny!

1. "All in a Day's Work" (E, Koool G Murder) – 3:24
2. "Saturday Morning" (E, Koool G Murder) – 2:55
3. "The Good Old Days" – 3:03
4. "Love of the Loveless" – 3:32
5. "Dirty Girl" – 2:41
6. "Agony" – 3:07
7. "Rock Hard Times" (E, Joe Gore) – 4:00
8. "Restraining Order Blues" – 3:11
9. "Lone Wolf" – 2:37
10. "Wrong About Bobby" – 2:46
11. "Numbered Days" (E, Gore) – 3:44
12. "Fashion Awards" – 3:07
13. "Somebody Loves You" – 3:02

== Personnel ==
Beautiful Freak
Eels

- Butch – drums, backing vocals, production, engineering
- E – vocals, guitar, Wurlitzer electric piano, production, engineering
- Tommy Walter – bass guitar, backing vocals

Additional musicians

- Jon Brion – guitar, trombone, Chamberlin
- Mark Goldenberg – guitar, keyboards, production, engineering
- Jim Jacobsen – keyboards, loops, engineering

Technical

- Michael Simpson – production, mixing
- Jon Brion – production, engineering
- Amir Derakh – engineering
- Matt Thorne – engineering
- Billy Kinsley – mixing
- Rob Seifert – mixing
- Stephen Marcussen – mastering
- Ann Giordano – photography
- Francesca Restrepo – art direction, sleeve design

Electro-Shock Blues
Eels

- E – vocals, guitar, bass, piano, keyboards, lyrics
- Butch – drums, percussion, backing vocals

Additional musicians

- Jon Brion – Chamberlin and Hammond organ on "Climbing to the Moon"
- T-Bone Burnett – bass on "Climbing to the Moon"
- Lisa Germano – violin on "Ant Farm"
- Parthenon Huxley – guitar on "Going to Your Funeral Part I"
- Jim Jacobsen – bass and keyboards on "Going to Your Funeral Part I", clarinet on "Going to Your Funeral Part II", arrangements
- John Leftwich – upright bass on "Ant Farm" and "Dead of Winter", bowed bass on "Dead of Winter"
- Elton Jones – backing vocals on "Last Stop: This Town"
- Bill Liston – saxophone on "Hospital Food"
- Volker Masthoff – vocals on "My Descent into Madness"
- Cynthia Merrill – backwards cello on "Efils' God"
- Grant-Lee Phillips – electric guitar, banjo, backing vocals on "Climbing to the Moon"
- Stuart Wylen – ½ Rhodes, guitar, alto and bass flutes on "The Medication Is Wearing Off"

Technical

- E – production
- Michael Simpson – production
- Mickey Petralia – production, mixing
- Greg Collins – mixing
- Jim Lang – mixing, conduction
- Stephen Marcussen – mastering
- Chester Brown – sleeve illustration
- Debbie Dreschler – sleeve illustration
- Hugh Everett III – sleeve illustration
- Joe Matt – sleeve illustration
- Francesca Restrepo – art direction, sleeve design
- H. Scott Rusch – illustration
- Seth – sleeve illustration
- Adrian Tomine – sleeve illustration

Daisies of the Galaxy
Eels

- Butch – drums, backing vocals
- E – vocals, guitar, electric bass, Wurlitzer organ, production, sleeve art direction, mixing

Additional musicians

- David Alvarez – drums
- Peter Buck – guitar
- Wayne Bergeron – horn
- Chris Bleth – horn
- Andy Martin – horn
- Grant-Lee Phillips – guitar

Technical

- Jim Lang – engineering, horn and string arrangements, mixing
- Bob Ludwig – mastering
- Mickey Petralia – programming, engineering
- Francesca Restrepo – sleeve design and art direction
- Jeffrey Shannon – engineering
- Michael Simpson – production, engineering, mixing
- James Stone – engineering
- Adrian Tomine – sleeve illustrations

Souljacker
Eels

- Butch – drums and percussion
- E – vocals, guitar, baritone guitar, piano, clavinet, Mellotron, and Wurlitzer organ
- Joe Gore – Guitar
- Koool G Murder – synthesizer, bass guitar, guitar, clavinet
- John Parish – guitar, percussion, drums, keyboards, melodica, and stylophone
- Adam Siegel – bass guitar

Production

- Ryan Boesch – programming, engineering, and mixing
- Greg Collins – tape transfer
- DJ Killingspree – liner notes
- E – production, art direction, and mixing
- Brian Gardner – mastering
- Chris Justice – engineering
- Koool G Murder – engineering
- Jim Lang – string arrangements
- John Parish – programming, production, engineering, and mixing
- Dan Pinder – technical assistance
- Francesca Restrepo – art direction
- Rocky Schenck – photography

Electro-Shock Blues Show
Eels

- Mark Oliver Everett – Vocals, guitar, and organ
- Butch – Drums, backing vocals, lead vocals on "Efil's God"
- Adam Siegel – Bass guitar and backing vocals

Additional musicians

- Emma, a fan chosen from the crowd – Sleigh bells on "Everything's Gonna Be Cool This Christmas"

Technical personnel

- E – Production
- Peter Keppler – Engineering
- Dan Hersch – Mastering

Shootenanny!
Eels

- Butch – drums and percussion
- E – vocals, guitar, keyboards, production
- Lisa Germano – violin
- Joe Gore – guitar, programming
- Koool G. Murder – bass guitar

Additional musicians

- Scott Gordon
- James King – saxophone
- Todd Simon – trumpet

Technical personnel

- Ryan Boesch – programming, engineering, mixing
- Greg Burns – engineering
- Greg Collins – programming, engineering, mixing
- Autumn deWilde – sleeve photography
- Bernie Grundman – mastering
- Dan Hersch – mastering
- Francesca Restrepo – sleeve art direction

== See also ==
- 2015 in American music
- List of 2015 albums
