= Meet the Eels: Essential Eels, Vol. 1 (1996–2006) =

Greatest hits album by Eels
- Released: January 15, 2008
- Recorded: 1996–2006
- Genre: Indie rock
- Length: 79:35
- Label: DreamWorks/Universal
- Producer: E, Jim Jacobson, John Parish, Mickey Petralia, and Michael Simpson

Eels chronology
Blinking Lights and Other Revelations (2005)	Meet the Eels: Essential Eels, Vol. 1 (1996–2006) (2008)	Hombre Lobo (2009)

Professional ratings
Review scores
Source	Rating
AllMusic	4/5 stars
Pitchfork Media	6.9/10
This Is Fake DIY	4.5/5 stars
Tiny Mix Tapes	4/5 stars

Meet the Eels: Essential Eels, Vol. 1 (1996–2006) is a greatest hits compilation to celebrate the tenth anniversary of rock band Eels, featuring a DVD of music videos, behind-the-scenes photos, and commentary by Mark Oliver Everett. It was released on January 15, 2008 in the United States and January 21, 2008 in the United Kingdom, where it debuted on the UK Album Chart at #26.

It was released in conjunction with the B-sides collection Useless Trinkets: B-Sides, Soundtracks, Rarities and Unreleased 1996–2006 and followed by Eels So Good: Essential Eels, Vol. 2 (2007–2020) in 2023.

== Track listing ==
=== CD ===
All songs written by E, except where noted:

1. "Novocaine for the Soul" (E and Mark Goldenberg) – 3:07
2. "Susan's House" (E, Jim Jacobsen, and Jim Weatherly) – 3:56
3. "My Beloved Monster" – 2:12
4. "Your Lucky Day in Hell" (E and Goldenberg) – 4:28
5. "3 Speed" – 2:45
6. "Last Stop: This Town" (E and Michael Simpson) – 3:28
7. "Climbing to the Moon" (Jon Brion Remix) – 3:56
8. "Flyswatter" – 3:17
9. "I Like Birds" – 2:33
10. "Mr. E's Beautiful Blues" (E and Simpson) – 4:01
11. "It's a Motherfucker" – 2:14
12. "Souljacker part I" (Butch, E, and Adam Siegel) – 3:16
13. "That's Not Really Funny" (E and John Parish) – 3:19
14. "Fresh Feeling" (E and Koool G Murder) – 3:39
15. "Get Ur Freak On" (Missy Elliott, Ludacris, and Timbaland) – 3:29
16. "Saturday Morning" (E and Koool G Murder) – 2:55
17. "Love of the Loveless" – 3:32
18. "Dirty Girl" (Live at Town Hall) – 3:00
19. "I Need Some Sleep" – 2:29
20. "Hey Man (Now You're Really Living)" – 3:02
21. "I'm Going to Stop Pretending That I Didn't Break Your Heart" – 3:55
22. "Trouble with Dreams" – 4:34
23. "Railroad Man" (Edit) – 3:38
24. "Losing Streak" – 2:50

=== DVD ===
1. "Novocaine for the Soul"
2. "Susan's House"
3. "Rags to Rags"
4. "Your Lucky Day in Hell"
5. "Last Stop: This Town"
6. "Cancer for the Cure"
7. "Flyswatter"
8. "Souljacker part I"
9. "Saturday Morning"
10. "Hey Man (Now You're Really Living)"
11. "Trouble with Dreams"
12. "Dirty Girl" (Live at Town Hall)

== Original releases for tracks ==
- 1–4: Beautiful Freak
- 5–6: Electro-Shock Blues
- 7: previously unreleased, original version on Electro-Shock Blues
- 8–11: Daisies of the Galaxy
- 12–14: Souljacker
- 15: previously unreleased cover of Missy Elliott, from the album Miss E... So Addictive
- 16–17: Shootenanny!
- 18: Eels with Strings: Live at Town Hall
- 19: Shrek 2: The Motion Picture Soundtrack
- 20–24: Blinking Lights and Other Revelations (track 23 edited from 4:16 for length)

=== Certifications ===
Region	Certification	Certified units/sales
United Kingdom (BPI)	Silver	60,000^{*}
^{*} Sales figures based on certification alone.
