= Things the Grandchildren Should Know =

Book by Mark Oliver Everett

- Cover of British edition
- Author: Mark Oliver Everett
- Audio read by: The Chet
- Cover artist: Duncan Spilling (art direction), Estuary English (concept)
- Language: English
- Genre: Autobiography, memoir
- Publisher: Little, Brown
- Publication date: January 10, 2008
- Publication place: United Kingdom
- Media type: Print (hardcover)
- Pages: 256 pp (first edition)
- ISBN: 978-0-316-02787-8
- OCLC: 271225732

Things the Grandchildren Should Know is an autobiography by Mark Oliver Everett, the front man of the independent rock band Eels. Everett spent a year writing the book between the release of the retrospectives Meet The Eels: Essential Eels, Vol. 1 (1996–2006) and Useless Trinkets: B-Sides, Soundtracks, Rarities and Unreleased 1996–2006 and the composition of 2009's Hombre Lobo.

== Title ==
The book shares its title with the closing track from the Eels' 2005 album Blinking Lights and Other Revelations. In that song Everett takes on the persona of an elderly grandfather sharing the wisdom he has learned about life shortly before his death. The parallels between the song and the book are loose, as Everett is much younger than his song persona. He remarks in the final chapter the irony of the title given that he has no children, let alone grandchildren (this changed when his son, Archie McGregor Everett, was born in 2017). The German edition's title “Glückstage in der Hölle” translates to "Lucky days in hell", resembling the name of the Eels' song "Your Lucky Day in Hell".

== Marketing ==
Unusual for a modern autobiography, neither inside the book nor the cover (first edition) includes photos of the author. Likewise, the cover refers to Everett's full name, rather than the better-known moniker E. The front and back cover avoid referring to his status as the front man of the Eels. Readings of portions of the text occurred during live sets during the 2008 Eels tour. Eels guitarist The Chet would later read the audiobook edition.

== Reception ==
Things the Grandchildren Should Know received generally positive reviews from critics from the United States—such as Joel Stein of Time—as well as British press—including The Guardian and The Independent. Antonia Quirke, writing for The Times claims that Everett "[P]icks the right stories to tell. A rare skill in the writers of memoirs," and sums up the book as "a subtle, touching thing." Pete Townshend's cover blurb calls it "[O]ne of the best books ever written by a contemporary artist." Everett's hometown press considered it "intellectual, wry and unflinching as it conveys complex emotions with simple, graceful language" and "a heartbreaking story of staggering genius." The book also received reviews from music publications, such as Spin, who considered the author "a clear-eyed and emotionally affecting writer" and Q, who gave it four out of five stars.

== Publication history ==
After the initial British pressing, the book was released in the United States by Thomas Dunne Books and St. Martin's Press on October 14, 2008 (ISBN 978-0-312-38513-2). An audio edition of this book was released on cassette tape, CD-ROM, and Compact Disc by Blackstone Audio on November 30, 2008. It was also made available on the iTunes Store. Editions would go on to be published in Belgium, Denmark, Cyprus, France, Germany, Iceland, India, The Netherlands, South Africa, Spain, Switzerland and Italy.
