= Useless Trinkets: B-Sides, Soundtracks, Rarities and Unreleased 1996–2006 =

Compilation album by Eels
- Released: January 15, 2008
- Recorded: 1996–2006
- Genre: Indie rock
- Length: 149:11
- Label: DreamWorks/Universal
- Producer: E

Eels chronology
Blinking Lights and Other Revelations (2005)	Useless Trinkets: B-Sides, Soundtracks, Rarities and Unreleased 1996–2006 (2008)	Hombre Lobo (2009)

Professional ratings
Review scores
Source	Rating
AllMusic	4/5 stars
Crawdaddy!	favorable
Pitchfork Media	5.5/10
Tiny Mix Tapes	3.5/5 stars

Useless Trinkets: B-Sides, Soundtracks, Rarities and Unreleased 1996–2006 is a rarities compilation to celebrate the tenth anniversary of rock band Eels, featuring a live performance DVD from Lollapalooza 2006, behind-the-scenes photos, and commentary by lead singer Mark Oliver Everett. It was released on January 15, 2008 in the United States and on January 21, 2008 in the United Kingdom, where it debuted on the UK Album Chart at #69.

It was released in conjunction with the greatest hits collection Meet the Eels: Essential Eels, Vol. 1 (1996–2006).

== Track listing ==
=== CDs ===
All songs written by E, except where noted:

CD 1

1. "Novocaine for the Soul" (Live from Hell) (E and Mark Goldenberg) – 3:18
  - Originally from "Rags to Rags" single (1997)
2. "Fucker" – 2:17
  - Originally from "Novocaine for the Soul" single (1996)
3. "My Beloved Monster" (Live from Tennessee) – 2:32
  - Originally from "Novocaine for the Soul" single
4. "Dog's Life" – 3:59
  - Originally from Welcome to Woop Woop soundtrack (1998)
5. "Susan's Apartment" (E, Jim Jacobsen, and Jim Weatherly) – 3:29
  - Originally from "Beautiful Freak" single (1997)
6. "Manchester Girl" (Live on the BBC) – 3:21
  - Originally from Beautiful Freak (1997) [Germany exclusive]
7. "Flower" (Live on the BBC) – 3:17
  - Originally from Beautiful Freak [Germany exclusive]
8. "My Beloved Mad Monster Party" (Live on the BBC) – 2:33
  - Originally from Beautiful Freak [Germany exclusive]
9. "Animal" (E and Jim Lang) – 2:39
  - Originally from "Rags to Rags" single (1996)
10. "Stepmother" – 2:51
  - Originally from "Susan's House" single (1997)
11. "Everything's Gonna Be Cool This Christmas" – 2:51
  - Originally from "Cancer for the Cure" single (1998)
12. "Your Lucky Day in Hell" (Michael Simpson remix) (E and Goldenberg) – 3:57
  - Originally a Promotional single, released 1998
13. "Altar Boy" (Rickie Lee Jones) – 2:14
  - Originally from "Beautiful Freak" single
14. "Novocaine for the Soul" (The Moog Cookbook remix) (E and Goldenberg) – 3:10
  - Originally from "Last Stop: This Town" single (1998)
15. "If I Was Your Girlfriend" (Live) (Prince) – 4:34
  - Previously unreleased
16. "Bad News" (Sally Dworsky and E) – 2:56
  - Originally from The End of Violence soundtrack (1997)
17. "Funeral Parlor" – 2:12
  - Originally from "Last Stop: This Town" single
18. "Hospital Food" (Live on the BBC) (Butch, E, and Lang) – 3:24
  - Originally from "Mr. E's Beautiful Blues" single (2000)
19. "Open the Door" (BBC) (Linda Hopper and Ruthie Morris) – 3:04
  - Originally from "Flyswatter" single (2000)
20. "Birdgirl on a Cell Phone" – 3:08
  - Originally from "Mr. E's Beautiful Blues" single
21. "Vice President Fruitley" (Butch, E, and Lisa Germano) – 2:17
  - Originally from "Flyswatter" single
22. "My Beloved Monstrosity" – 2:13
  - Originally from "Souljacker part I" single (2001)
23. "The Dark End of the Street" (Live) (Dan Penn and Chips Moman) – 2:35
  - Previously unreleased
24. "The Cheater's Guide to Your Heart" (Live) – 2:39
  - Previously unreleased
25. "Useless Trinkets" – 2:22
  - Previously unreleased

CD 2

1. "Mr. E's Beautiful Remix" (E and Simpson) – 3:54
  - Originally from 22 Miles of Hard Road EP (2001)
2. "Souljacker part I" (Alternate version) (Butch, E, and Adam Siegel) – 3:04
  - Previously unreleased
3. "Dog Faced Boy" (Alternate version) (E and John Parish) – 2:54
  - Previously unreleased
4. "Jennifer Eccles" (Allan Clarke and Graham Nash) – 3:20
  - Originally from Sing Hollies in Reverse tribute album (1995 – as E) and "Souljacker part I" single (2001)
5. "Rotten World Blues" – 2:45
  - Originally from Rotten World Blues EP (2001)
6. "Can't Help Falling in Love" (Luigi Creatore, Hugo Peretti, and George David Weiss) – 2:08
  - Originally from "Souljacker part I" single
7. "Christmas Is Going to the Dogs" – 2:58
  - Originally from How the Grinch Stole Christmas soundtrack (2000)
8. "Mighty Fine Blues" – 3:26
  - Originally from Holes soundtrack (2003)
9. "Eyes Down" – 3:32
  - Originally from Holes soundtrack
10. "Skywriting" – 2:07
  - Originally from Levity soundtrack (2003)
11. "Taking a Bath in Rust" – 2:28
  - Originally from Levity soundtrack
12. "Estranged Friends" (E and Koool G Murder) – 3:21
  - Previously unreleased
13. "Her" – 2:48
  - Originally from "Saturday Morning" single (2003)
14. "Waltz of the Naked Clowns" – 2:47
  - Originally from "Saturday Morning" single
15. "I Like Birds" (Live) – 2:36
  - Previously unreleased
16. "Sad Foot Sign" – 2:19
  - Originally from "Saturday Morning" single
17. "Living Life" (Daniel Johnston) – 2:49
  - Originally from The Late Great Daniel Johnston: Discovered Covered tribute (2004)
18. "The Bright Side" (Peter Buck and E) – 3:42
  - Originally from "Hey Man (Now You're Really Living)" single (2005)
19. "After the Operation" – 1:55
  - Originally from "Hey Man (Now You're Really Living)" single
20. "Jelly Dancers" (Bruce Haack and Esther Nelson) – 4:38
  - Originally from Dimension Mix compilation (2005)
21. "I Could Never Take the Place of Your Man" (Live at Town Hall) (Prince) – 3:37
  - Originally from Eels with Strings: Live at Town Hall (2006) [iTunes exclusive]
22. "Mr. E's Beautiful Blues" (Live at Town Hall) (E and Simpson) – 3:04
  - Originally from Eels with Strings: Live at Town Hall (iTunes exclusive)
23. "I Want to Protect You" – 3:09
  - Originally from "I Want to Protect You" single (2006)
24. "I Put a Spell on You" (Live) (Screamin' Jay Hawkins) – 2:21
  - Previously unreleased
25. "Saw a UFO" – 4:37
  - Previously unreleased

=== DVD ===
1. "Saturday Morning"
2. "Eyes Down"
3. "My Beloved Monster"
4. "From Which I Came/A Magic World"
5. "Not Ready Yet"
6. "Souljacker part I"

== Advertisement controversy ==
Eels attempted to run a one-second edit of their seven-second ad during the television broadcast of the 2008 Super Bowl to promote Useless Trinkets, but were denied by the National Football League.

Lead singer E reported: "In the end we were told that the NFL would have to find 29 other advertisers to buy 1 second spots to fill a standard 30 second advertising slot and that they do not sell advertising time by the second. They also noted that a rapid fire 30 second segment of thirty 1 second commercials could cause people with certain medical conditions to have seizures and that it was against network regulations."
