= I Am the Messiah =

Studio album by MC Honky
- Released: November 4, 2002
- Recorded: mid-2000
- Genre: Dance
- Length: 46:37
- Label: Liberation (Australia)/B Unique (Europe)/Imperial (Japan)/SpinART (United States)
- Producer: Wally Gagel; MC Honky

MC Honky chronology
| Souljacker (2001) | I Am the Messiah (2002) | Blinking Lights and Other Revelations (2005) |

Professional ratings
Review scores
| Source | Rating |
|---|---|
| AllMusic | link |
| Mojo | 3/5 stars |
| Spin | favorable |

I Am the Messiah is the only album by MC Honky, released in 2002. Supposedly a middle-age disc jockey from Silverlake, California, MC Honky is a character played by Mark Oliver Everett (or "E") of Eels.

To support the album, an actor would open Eels shows as Honky, to "prove" that he and E were two separate persons. E and MC Honky also engaged in a comic feud on the Internet, in which E hoped MC Honky would catch SARS.

The creator of the MC Honky artwork and videos is Ivan Brunetti.

Guests on the album include Eels drummer Butch, Eels bassist Koool G Murder, and Joey Waronker. An animated music video was made for "Sonnet No. 3 (Like a Duck)" and included on the enhanced CD.

== Track listing ==
1. "Sonnet No. 3 (Like a Duck)" (Sir Rock-a-Lot and Sir Whacks-a-Lot) – 4:25
2. "Hung Up" (Sir Rock-A-Lot and Sir Whacks-A-Lot) – 3:41
3. "The Object" (Sir Rock-A-Lot and Playboy Gigolo Bandit) – 3:20
4. "A Good Day to Be You" (Sir Rock-A-Lot and Sir Whacks-A-Lot) – 3:39
5. "Baby Elephant Rock-A-Bye" (Wally Gagel and Sir Rock-A-Lot) – 4:28
6. "What a Bringdown" (Sir Rock-A-Lot and Playboy Gigolo Bandit) – 3:50
7. "Only a Rose Pt. I" (Rudolf Friml and Brian Hooker) – 2:24
8. "My Bad Seed" (Sir Rock-A-Lot and Playboy Gigolo Bandit) – 3:36
9. "The Devil Went Down to Silverlake" (Gagel and Sir Rock-A-Lot) – 3:28
10. "Soft Velvety 'Fer"(L'il Fer, Sir Rock-A-Lot, and Sir Whacks-A-Lot) – 3:53
11. "The Baby That Was You" (Sir Rock-A-Lot and Sir Whacks-A-Lot) – 3:44
12. "3 Turntables & 2 Microphones" (Sir Rock-A-Lot and Sir Whacks-A-Lot) – 4:09
13. "Only a Rose Pt. II" (Friml and Hooker) – 2:00

Japanese edition bonus 7" single

1. "The Object" (Sir Rock-A-Lot and Playboy Gigolo Bandit) – 3:25
2. "What a Bringdown" (Sir Rock-A-Lot and Playboy Gigolo Bandit) – 3:51
3. "Hung Up" (Sir Rock-A-Lot and Sir Whacks-A-Lot) – 4:05

The Japanese release includes an unplugged set recorded for Xfm radio.

== Personnel ==
Musicians

- Butch – Drums and percussion
- Koool G Murder – Bass guitar, backing vocals, vocals on "A Good Day to Be You"
- Li'l Fer – Vocals on "Soft Velvety 'Fer"
- MC Honky – Vocals
- Joey Waronker – Drums and percussion

Production

- Curt Anderson – Programming and engineering
- Ryan Boesch – Programming and engineering
- Bernie Grundman – Mastering
- Francesca Restrepo – Art direction
- Joey Waronker – Programming and engineering

== Release history ==
- November 4, 2002 (Australia)
- March 31, 2003 (Europe)
- April 8, 2003 (US)
- June 25, 2003 (Japan)
