= Levity =

Levity may refer to:

- a sense of amusement, the opposite of gravitas
- Levity (film)
  - Levity (soundtrack), the soundtrack for the film of the same name
