= Numbered Days =

Numbered Days may refer to:

- "Numbered Days", a song by Killswitch Engage from Alive or Just Breathing, 2002
- "Numbered Days", a song by Eels from Shootenanny!, 2003
- Días contados, a 1994 Spanish film titled Numbered Days in English-speaking markets
