= Eels Time! =

Studio album by Eels
- Released: June 7, 2024
- Recorded: September 2023 – February 2024
- Studio: The Compound (Signal Hill) Hollywood, Los Feliz; Garage Band Palace; Old County (Dublin)
- Length: 41:04
- Label: E Works; PIAS
- Producer: Sean Coleman; E; Tyson Ritter

Eels chronology
Eels So Good: Essential Eels, Vol. 2 (2007–2020) (2023)	Eels Time! (2024)	Cookie Happened (2026)

Singles from Eels Time!
- 1. "Time" Released: February 29, 2024

Eels Time! is the fifteenth studio album by the American indie rock band Eels. It was released on June 7, 2024, through E Works/PIAS Recordings.

== Background ==
Eels Time! features 12 tracks and was written by lead member Mark Oliver Everett at their first in-person sessions following the COVID-19 pandemic. It was recorded between Los Feliz, Hollywood Los Angeles and Crumlin, Dublin, Ireland, and features contributions from various artists, including Koool G Murder, The Chet, Tyson Ritter, and Sean Coleman. On February 29, 2024, the band announced Eels Time! and released the lead single "Time" alongside the news. The semi-titular opening "balmy acoustic number" is a track about the concept of time.

== Track listing ==
Eels Time! track listing
No.	Title	Lyrics	Music	Producer(s)	Length
1.	"Time"	Mark Oliver Everett	Everett	E	2:25
2.	"We Won't See Her Like Again"	Everett	Everett; Chet Lyster	E	3:03
3.	"Goldy"	Everett; Tyson Ritter	Everett; Ritter	E; Ritter	4:08
4.	"Sweet Smile"	Everett	Everett	E	3:28
5.	"Haunted Hero"	Everett	Everett; Ritter	Ritter	2:51
6.	"If I'm Gonna Go Anywhere"	Everett	Everett; Ritter	E; Ritter	4:23
7.	"And You Run"	Everett	Everett	E; Sean Coleman	3:40
8.	"Lay with the Lambs"	Everett; Ritter	Everett; James Larner; Ritter	E; Ritter	3:31
9.	"Song for You Know Who"	Everett; Ritter	Everett	E; Ritter	2:17
10.	"I Can't Believe It's True"	Everett	Everett; Koool G Murder	E	3:56
11.	"On the Bridge"	Everett	Everett; Larner; Ritter	E	3:17
12.	"Let's Be Lucky"	Everett; Ritter	Everett; Coleman	E; Ritter	4:05
Total length:					41:04

== Personnel ==
- Dan Hersch – mastering
- E – mixing, recording (tracks 1, 3–12); inner sleeve photo
- Koool G Murder – mixing, recording (tracks 1, 4, 9, 10)
- Ryan Boesch – mixing, recording (track 2)
- Tyson Ritter – mixing, recording (tracks 3, 5, 6, 8, 11)
- Sean Coleman – mixing, recording (tracks 7, 12)
- Gus Black – gatefold photo
- Audra Napolitano – live photo at Webster Hall

== Charts ==
Chart performance for Eels Time!
Chart (2024)	Peak position
Austrian Albums (Ö3 Austria)	17
Belgian Albums (Ultratop Flanders)	16
Belgian Albums (Ultratop Wallonia)	24
German Albums (Offizielle Top 100)	24
Scottish Albums (OCC)	16
Swiss Albums (Schweizer Hitparade)	18
UK Album Downloads (OCC)	21
UK Independent Albums (OCC)	5
