= Hey Man (Now You're Really Living) =

2005 single by Eels

Single by Eels

from the album Blinking Lights and Other Revelations
- Released: March 22, 2005 (iTunes); May 9, 2005 (international)
- Genre: Alternative rock; indie pop
- Length: 3:02
- Label: Polydor
- Songwriter(s): Mark Oliver Everett

Eels singles chronology
"Souljacker Part I" (2001)	"Hey Man (Now You're Really Living)" (2005)	"My Timing Is Off" / "Fresh Blood" (2009)

"Hey Man (Now You're Really Living)" is a song by American rock band Eels. It was the first single released from their 2005 double album Blinking Lights and Other Revelations.

== Content ==
"Hey Man (Now You're Really Living)" has an upbeat sound, and the lyrics reflect the worldview of a man emerging from depression.

== Release ==
The single reached number 45 on the UK Singles Chart.

The video to this song can be viewed on bonus section of the DVD release of Eels with Strings: Live at Town Hall. This song is featured in the soundtracks of the movies Just My Luck, What Happens in Vegas and Charlie Bartlett.

According to OU Athens film student Todd MichaeL Wiseman, this same song is also used during the opening title sequence of the romantic re-make movie called Griffin & Phoenix, a love story regarding transcention to the afterlife.

== Track listing ==
UK CD

1. "Hey Man (Now You're Really Living)"
2. "The Bright Side"
3. "Love of the Loveless (Live)"

UK 7"

1. "Hey Man (Now You're Really Living)"
2. "After the Operation"

U.S. iTunes version/international CD

1. "Hey Man (Now You're Really Living)"
2. "After the Operation"
3. "The Bright Side"
4. "Love of the Loveless (Live)"
