= Levity (film) =

2003 film by Ed Solomon

- Promotional poster
- Directed by: Ed Solomon
- Written by: Ed Solomon
- Produced by: Richard N. Gladstein; Adam J. Merims; Ed Solomon
- Starring: Billy Bob Thornton; Morgan Freeman; Holly Hunter; Kirsten Dunst
- Cinematography: Roger Deakins
- Edited by: Pietro Scalia
- Music by: Mark Oliver Everett
- Production companies: StudioCanal; Revelations Entertainment
- Distributed by: Sony Pictures Classics
- Release dates: January 16, 2003 (Sundance); April 4, 2003 (limited)
- Running time: 100 minutes
- Countries: United States; France
- Language: English
- Box office: $723,040

Levity is a 2003 drama film directed by Ed Solomon starring Billy Bob Thornton, Morgan Freeman, Holly Hunter, and Kirsten Dunst. The soundtrack was composed by Mark Oliver Everett of the band Eels. Levity was filmed in Montreal, Quebec, Canada. It was the opening film at the 2003 Sundance Film Festival and went into a limited release on April 4, 2003.

== Plot ==
Manuel Jordan, a man who served nearly 23 years for killing a teenager during an attempted robbery, is released on parole in spite of his objections. After spending his time staring at a clipping of Abner Easley, the boy he killed, he returns to the city he used to live in to find redemption. He ends up living at a community house which is run by Miles Evans, a preacher. He offers Manuel work so he can pay for the room, and Manuel places Abner's photo in his room to remind himself of his crime.

While staying at the community house, he befriends Sofia Mellinger, a wild young woman with no adult figure in her life. Manuel also encounters Adele Easley, the elder sister of Abner. She does not recognize Manuel and in his pursuit for forgiveness, he forms a friendship with her, and their relationship begins to develop.

Manuel gets his chance for redemption when Adele's rebellious teenage son becomes involved in violence. Manuel tries to befriend him and steer him in the right direction, ever mindful of the past.

== Cast ==
- Billy Bob Thornton as Manuel Jordan
- Morgan Freeman as Miles Evans
- Holly Hunter as Adele Easley
- Kirsten Dunst as Sofia Mellinger
- Manuel Aranguiz as Senor Aguilar
- Geoffrey Wigdor as Abner Easley
  - Luke Robertson as young Abner
- Dorian Harewood as Mackie Whittaker
- Catherine Colvey as Claire Mellinger
- Billoah Greene as Don
- Sadiki Burke as Sadiki
- Abede Burke as Abede
- Diego Abella as Raul
- Brent Rogers as Ty
- Cordell Clyde as Cleve
- David Acer as Comedian

== Production ==
Writer and director Ed Solomon crafted the story based on an early experience he had as a tutor for teenagers in prison. "I met this kid who had killed somebody and had been tried as an adult and sentenced to life in prison. And he kept a photograph of the person he had killed. The judge had told him to keep this and have it...He would stare at it like he didn’t know it was a human being, like he was trying to take this two-dimensional image and have it become three dimensional. And then he was gone; he turned 18 and he went to the state prison."

Having written the screenplays for comedy films like Bill & Ted’s Excellent Adventure and Men in Black, Solomon originally envisioned a lighter take on the story, where Miles and Manual take charge of kids who aspire to be comedians. Solomon wrote the role of Miles specifically with Morgan Freeman in mind.

== Reception ==
On Rotten Tomatoes, the film has an approval rating of 34%, based on 91 reviews, with an average rating of 5.28/10. The website's critical consensus reads, "Levity could really use some, as it's weighted down by dour self-importance and a heavy-handed message." On Metacritic, the film has a weighted average score of 45 out of 100, based on 29 critics, indicating "mixed or average" reviews.

Todd McCarthy of Variety called it "A half-baked moral fable that suffers from insufficiencies both of narrative concreteness and religious depth." A. O. Scott of The New York Times wrote: "The actors, too, bring more realism -- more gravity, if you will -- to the film than its wobbly premise deserves."

== Soundtrack ==
Levity

Film score by Mark Oliver Everett
- Released: April 22, 2003
- Recorded: 2002
- Genre: Soundtrack
- Length: 35:38
- Label: Plexi Music
- Producer: Mark Oliver Everett

Mark Oliver Everett chronology
Souljacker (2001)	Levity (2003)	Shootenanny! (2003)

The Levity soundtrack was produced by Mark Oliver Everett of Eels. Two of the tracks were used for the film Knocked Up.

1. "What I Remember Most" – 2:17
2. "Skywriting" – 2:07*
3. "Running the Bath" – :31
4. "Gravity" – 2:18
5. "Haunted Piano #1" – 2:33
6. "In Manual's Room" – 1:34
7. "Taking a Bath in Rust" – 2:28*
8. "Flashback Rules" – 1:44
9. "Post-flashback Blues" – 1:19
10. "Lonesome Subway" – 1:01
11. "Haunted Organ #1" – 2:39
12. "Sofia Writing in the Sky" – 2:23
13. "To Adel Easley/Trouble in the Alley" – 6:40
14. "Manual's Got a Train to Catch" – 5:04

*Track performed by Eels

- Ryan Boesch – Engineering and Mixing
- Tracy Bonham – Violin and Orchestration
- Jessica Catron – Cello
- Mark Oliver Everett – Vocals, guitar
- Jim Lang – Orchestration
- Jonathan Norton – Drums and percussion
- Dan Pinder – Technical assistance
