= Cold Dead Hand =

Single by Jim Carrey with The Eels as "Lonesome Earl and the Clutterbusters"
- Released: March 14, 2013
- Genre: Western; satire; comedy
- Length: 4:15
- Songwriter: Jim Carrey

"Cold Dead Hand" is a 2013 single and accompanying music video created for American comedy website Funny or Die by comedian Jim Carrey with The Eels, playing as "Lonesome Earl and the Clutterbusters".

The title is a reference to a statement by the deceased National Rifle Association president Charlton Heston at the 2000 National Rifle Association convention, "I'll give you my gun when you pry (or take) it from my cold, dead hands." The song ridicules gun culture and includes a derisive caricature of Heston declaring that he could not enter Heaven, as even the angels could not pry the gun from his hands.

The video was staged as an episode of the variety program Hee Haw in which Heston is a guest star, and also features The Eels dressed as Abraham Lincoln, Mahatma Gandhi and John Lennon. The single marks the Eels' first release since their album Wonderful, Glorious earlier in 2013.

The novelty song evoked strong responses in conservative media for several reasons, including the repeated implication by Carrey that gun obsession is related to American male phallus-size anxiety.
