= Luke Robertson =

British adventurer, endurance athlete, and motivational speaker

Luke Robertson is a British and Scottish explorer, adventurer, endurance athlete and motivational speaker.

He is an Explorer-in-Residence for the Royal Scottish Geographical Society, an Arctic Guide for The Polar Academy and a professional motivational speaker, represented by Speaker Buzz.

In January 2016, aged 30, he became the youngest Brit, the first Scot - and the first person in history with an artificial pacemaker - to ski solo, unsupported and unassisted to the South Pole in Antarctica. The trip began at Hercules Inlet (78.5°S) on the Ronne Ice Shelf and ended at the Geographic South Pole (90°S). The trip covered a distance of 730 miles (1175 km) over 40 days.

== Early life ==
Robertson was born in Aberdeen, Scotland, and attended Netherley Primary School in Aberdeenshire, and grew up on a farm in Blairs, Maryculter. He also attended primary school in Montreuil Bellay, in the Vallee de La Loire, France, and Luss Primary School, Loch Lomond. Luke was then educated at Mackie Academy Secondary School in Stonehaven.

He has an MA Hons Joint Honours degree in History & French from the University of Glasgow and has an MSc in Investment and Finance from the University of Strathclyde Business School.

== Solo South Pole expedition ==
In January 2016, he became the youngest Brit and the first Scot to ski solo, unsupported and unassisted to the South Pole in Antarctica. He set off from Hercules Inlet on the edge of Antarctica on 5 December 2015 and arrived at the Geographic South Pole on 13 January 2016, completing expedition 'Due South 2015'.

Upon arrival Luke was quoted as saying that he "What an unbelievable and surreal feeling. I feel on top of the bottom of the world." Sir Ranulph Fiennes, who was patron of the trip congratulated Luke on his efforts. Sir Ranulph said: "I am delighted that Luke has reached the South Pole and becomes the youngest Brit ever to do so, unaided. "It is an incredible achievement and I hope that his adventure inspires others to achieve their own goals in life and to raise funds for Marie Curie - a charity also close to my heart."

This achievement was raised as a motion at the Scottish Parliament, in February 2016.

== Medical challenges ==
In May 2008, Robertson was fitted with an artificial pacemaker to treat 'complete heart block' and then in January 2010, he underwent a second operation to insert the pacemaker deeper. In February 2014, he underwent brain surgery when diagnosed with a brain tumour. Following surgery, it was revealed to be a large and extremely rare (benign) enterogenous cyst.

== Other adventures ==
He has been on winter expeditions to central Norway, Eastern Greenland, Sapmi and Alaska. In 2016 he successfully completed the inaugural Cape Wrath Ultra marathon. The race from Fort William to Cape Wrath took place over 8 days and covered a distance of 250 miles (400 km+). The winner of the ladies race, Emanuela Marzotto, from Italy said: "This race is the hardest thing I’ve done, harder than the 10 day race in Australia or the Marathon Des Sables. ". Among other events, he has also competed in the Lake District Ten Peaks Ultra, the Big Ben Nevis Triathlon in Fort William and the Wimbleball 70.3 Iron Man.

== Personal life ==
Alongside his wife and fellow adventurer and endurance athlete, Hazel Robertson (née Clyne), he has thus far raised over £70,000 for Marie Curie through funds raised by this expedition and other endeavours. They live together in Edinburgh. He helps front the 'Greener Scotland' Campaign.

He is an ambassador for the Polar Academy and for Marie Curie.
