= Shootenanny! =

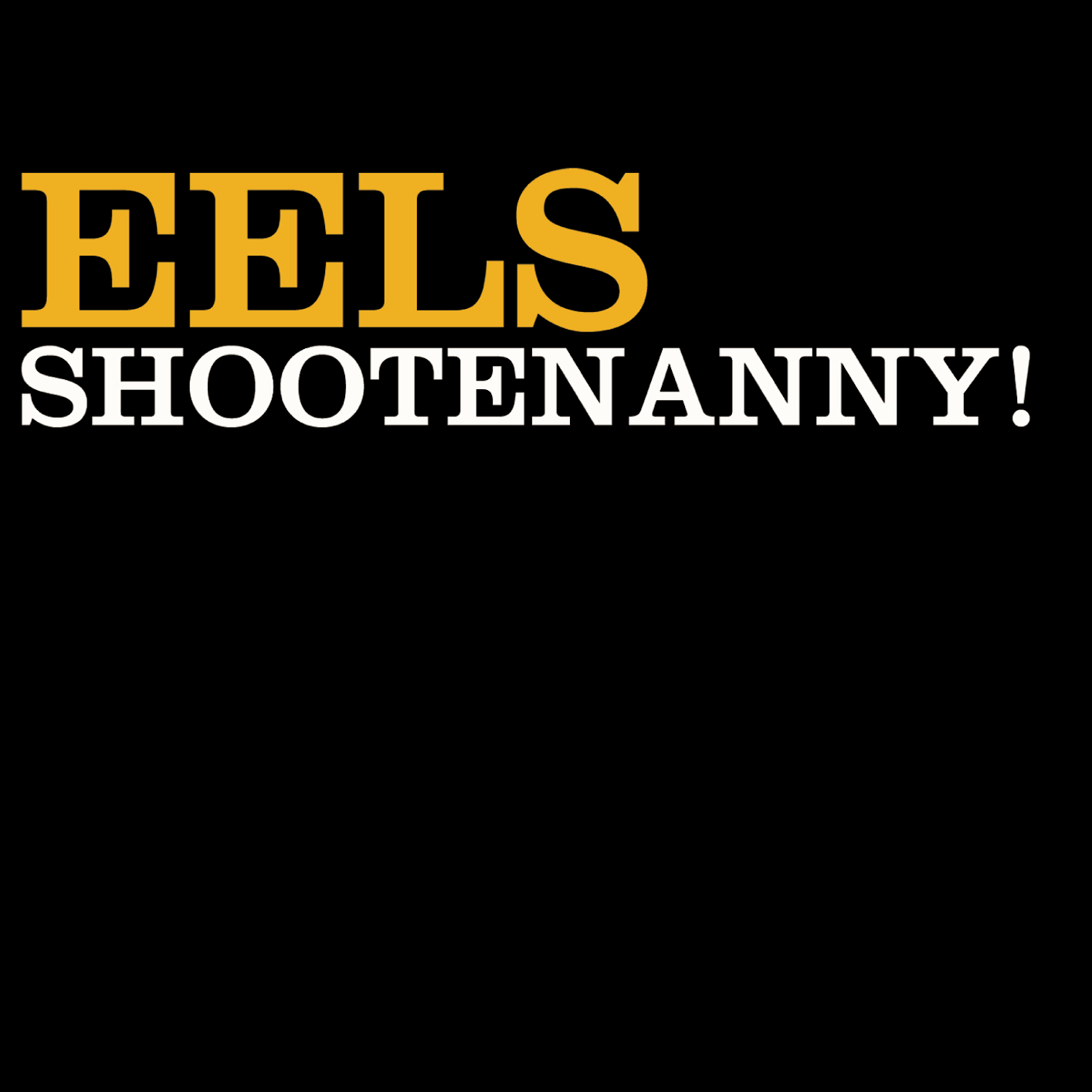

Studio album by Eels
- Released: June 3, 2003
- Recorded: November 2002 – April 2003
- Studio: Conway Studios Hollywood Onehitsville
- Genre: pop rock; power pop; roots rock; folk pop; art pop
- Length: 41:09
- Label: DreamWorks
- Producer: E

Eels chronology
Levity (2002)	Shootenanny! (2003)	Blinking Lights and Other Revelations (2005)

Shootenanny! /ˈʃuːtənæni/ is the fifth studio album by American rock band Eels, released on June 3, 2003, and was to the band's last release on record label DreamWorks. The album peaked at number 145 on the Billboard 200, the first album to chart since Beautiful Freak in 1996.

"Saturday Morning" was released on June 3, 2003 as a promotional single with the B-sides "Her", "Waltz of the Naked Clowns", and "Sad Foot Sign".

== Background ==
While lead singer Mark Oliver "E" Everett was working on the double disc Blinking Lights and Other Revelations project, he had the idea to make a "succinct, direct and no bullshit" record, inspired by the writing style of blues singer-songwriter Muddy Waters.

Before the recording of the album, Everett and drummer Jonathan Norton were in conflict. Norton left Eels after a Last Call with Carson Daly performance during the Souljacker tour, later telling a journalist his decision was "a business thing". However, he participated in the recording sessions for Shootenanny!, working as a freelancer rather than a member of the band, with tensions still intact. This would be the last album with new recordings from Norton, although earlier sessions featuring him would appear on the Blinking Lights album two years later.

Recording of the album took place for 10 days during late November 2002 with minimal production. The album was recorded onto two-inch tape and edited digitally using Pro Tools. Shootenanny! was recorded and mixed by Greg Collins, who recorded "Climbing to the Moon" on Electro-Shock Blues.

=== Title ===
The album's name comes from a neologism, coined by Everett, for "a social gathering at which participants engage in folk singing and sometimes dancing [a hootenanny], but mostly the shooting of guns."

== Critical reception ==
Professional ratings
Aggregate scores
Source	Rating
Metacritic	73/100
Review scores
Source	Rating
AllMusic	4/5 stars
Blender	3/5 stars
Entertainment Weekly	B+
The Guardian	2/5 stars
Pitchfork	2.8/10
Rolling Stone	4/5 stars
The Rolling Stone Album Guide	3.5/5 stars
Spin	C
Stylus	6.3/10
The Village Voice	(dud)

Shootenanny! received a generally favorable response, though some critics were divided.

Greg Kot of Entertainment Weekly called the album "downright moving at its best", saying "It offers the Eels' usual twisted take on California pop-rock, with more prominent blues voicings to complement the scrappy guitars and narcotized atmospherics." A negative review came from Chris Dahlen of Pitchfork, who wrote: "Musically and lyrically, E is spent – out of ideas, out of innovation, unable to cough up anything but by-the-numbers pop in the fourteen originals he wrote for this disc." Dom Passantino of Stylus opined that the album "suffers from a lack of identity".Spin gave a negative review, saying "This is the kind of bedroom folk pop E's done prettier--and weirder--before."

John Harris of Blender praised it, saying "Mark “E” Everett’s creative essence remains unchanged. He still combines his at-odds-with-the-world dysfunction — embodied on the misfit roadhouse rocker “All in a Day’s Work” by his keening, lived-in vocal style — with perfectly realized art-pop." bur noted it was "not nearly as musically ambitious" as Beautiful Freak (1996) and concluded, "Everett can still match the cream of his previous work."Rolling Stone called it "Lighter and more laid-back, with breezy melodies and fuzzy guitar-and-keyboard arrangements that sound built for a summer night's drive.", while Q noted "a sunnier, jangly guitar pop backdrop". The Guardian was critical, dismissing the album as "an adolescent demand for attention with little justification."

Stephen Thomas Erlewine of AllMusic called the album the band's best since Electro Shock Blues (1998), finding it to be more accessible than the latter, saying Everett "sounds like a combination of Beck and Tom Waits, put through a power pop prism." and "This record isn't folky, the way hootenannies were, but it does have a strong blues and singer/songwriter element to the record."

== Track listing ==
All tracks are written by E, except where noted.

No.	Title	Writer(s)	Length
1.	"All in a Day's Work"	E; Koool G Murder	3:24
2.	"Saturday Morning"	E; Koool G Murder	2:55
3.	"The Good Old Days"		3:03
4.	"Love of the Loveless"		3:32
5.	"Dirty Girl"		2:41
6.	"Agony"		3:07
7.	"Rock Hard Times"	E; Joe Gore	4:00
8.	"Restraining Order Blues"		3:11
9.	"Lone Wolf"		2:37
10.	"Wrong About Bobby"		2:46
11.	"Numbered Days"	E; Joe Gore	3:44
12.	"Fashion Awards"		3:07
13.	"Somebody Loves You"		3:02
Total length:			41:09

== Personnel ==
Eels

- Butch – drums and percussion
- E – vocals, guitar, keyboards, production
- Lisa Germano – violin
- Joe Gore – guitar, programming
- Koool G. Murder – bass guitar

Additional musicians

- Scott Gordon
- James King – saxophone
- Todd Simon – trumpet

Technical personnel

- Ryan Boesch – programming, engineering, mixing
- Greg Burns – engineering
- Greg Collins – programming, engineering, mixing
- Autumn deWilde – sleeve photography
- Bernie Grundman – mastering
- Dan Hersch – mastering on "Agony"
- Francesca Restrepo – sleeve art direction

== Charts ==
Sales chart performance for Shootenanny!
Chart (2003)	Peak position
Australian Albums (ARIA)	38
Belgian Albums (Ultratop Flanders)	14
Belgian Albums (Ultratop Wallonia)	45
Dutch Albums (Album Top 100)	58
French Albums (SNEP)	58
German Albums (Offizielle Top 100)	56
Irish Albums (IRMA)	44
Italian Albums (FIMI)	58
Swiss Albums (Schweizer Hitparade)	54
UK Albums (OCC)	35
US Billboard 200	145

== In popular culture ==
"Saturday Morning" is featured in the documentary Wordplay. The song "Agony" was used on the soundtrack of the SyFy TV show Stargate Universe in the 17th episode of the first season.
