= Eels (band) =

American indie rock band

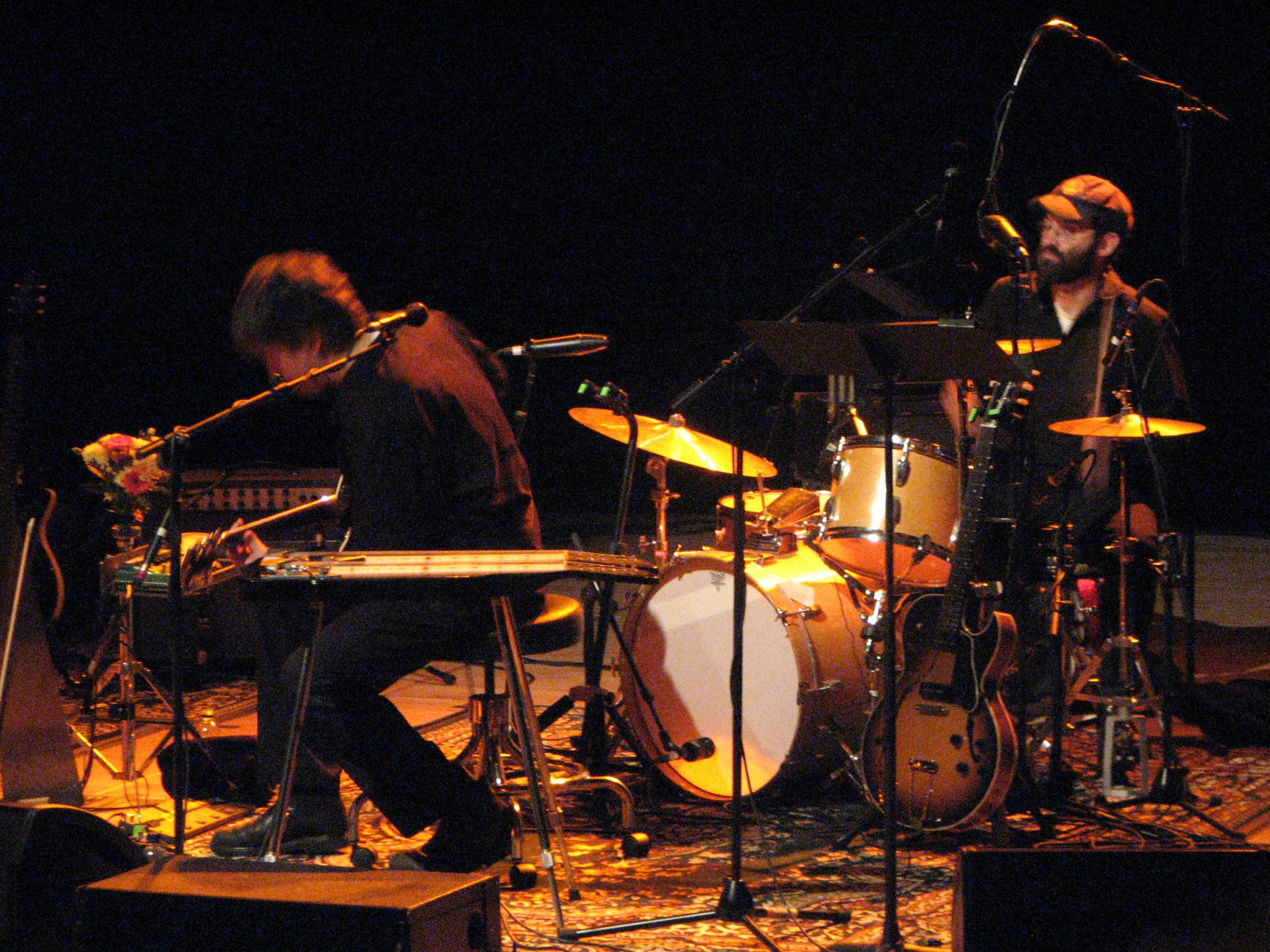
- Birmingham Town Hall, February 2008 (left to right): The Chet and E

Background information
- Origin: Los Feliz, Los Angeles, California, U.S.
- Genres: Alternative rock; indie rock; trip hop
- Years active: 1995–present
- Labels: DreamWorks; Vagrant; E Works
- Members: E (Mark Oliver Everett); The Chet (Jeff Lyster); Koool G Murder (Kelly Logsdon); P-Boo (Mike Sawitzke); Knuckles (Derek Brown); Big/Krazy/Tiny/Honest/Upright/Royal Al (Allen Hunter)
- Past members: Tommy Walter; Jonathan "Butch" Norton

Eels (often typeset in lower case or all caps) is an American rock band formed in Los Angeles in 1995 by singer-songwriter and multi-instrumentalist Mark Oliver Everett, known by the stage name E. Band members have changed over the years, both in the studio and on stage, making Everett the only constant member for most of the band's work.

Eels' music is often filled with themes of family, death, and unrequited love. Since 1996, Eels has released sixteen studio albums, seven of which entered the Billboard 200.

== History ==
Eels were officially founded when Butch and E met Tommy Walter. The name "Eels" was chosen so that the band's records would be close to E's solo records in an alphabetical ordering, although it was too late once they realized that numerous Eagles and Earth, Wind and Fire releases were in between. "I went to the Virgin Megastore and I see the E CDs right at the beginning of the E section," Everett recalled on the Naked Lunch podcast with Phil Rosenthal and David Wild. "And then there's like, 28 Earth, Wind and Fire [albums], 40 Eagles [albums]—they're nowhere near each other!"

Eels became one of the first acts to sign a record deal with DreamWorks Records, followed by Elliott Smith.

=== Beautiful Freak ===
In 1996, the band released their debut album Beautiful Freak. The singles "Novocaine for the Soul", "Susan's House" and "Your Lucky Day in Hell" achieved modest national and international success, with the band winning the Best International Breakthrough Act award at the 1998 BRIT Awards. The single Susan's House was extremely popular in the UK, in part due to its stylistic resemblance to the then-popular trip hop genre, with its slow tempo, subdued melody, and distorted spoken-word vocals. In 1996 and 1997, Eels toured extensively to support the album, building their name as a live act in the United States and Europe. In September 1997, Walter quit the band.

Released in May 2001, the motion picture soundtrack for the movie Shrek included the song "My Beloved Monster".

=== Electro-Shock Blues ===
Following the success of Beautiful Freak, E experienced a difficult time in his personal life. His sister died by suicide, and his mother was diagnosed with cancer. These events inspired Eels' second album, 1998's Electro-Shock Blues. The album deals with many difficult subjects, including cancer, mental illness, suicide and death. The 1982 death of his father, physicist Hugh Everett III, inspired the song "Baby Genius". Contributors to the album included Jon Brion, Lisa Germano, Jim Jacobsen, Grant-Lee Phillips, Dust Brother Michael Simpson, and T-Bone Burnett.

The single "Last Stop: This Town" saw minor success, while "Cancer for the Cure", the second single from the album, appeared on the soundtrack for American Beauty (1999).

Still a three-piece band on stage, Tommy Walter was replaced by Adam Siegel. Part of the American leg of the tour was canceled after the death of E's mother. They returned to tour Europe later in the year, to open for Pulp.

=== Daisies of the Galaxy ===
In 2000, Eels released Daisies of the Galaxy. The album, which was recorded almost entirely in E's basement, is lighter and more upbeat than its predecessor. Everett noted, "if Electro-Shock Blues was the phone call in the middle of the night that the world doesn't want to answer, then Daisies of the Galaxy is the hotel wake-up call that says your lovely breakfast is ready". He was joined in the studio by Michael Simpson (Dust Brothers), Grant-Lee Phillips (Grant Lee Buffalo), and Peter Buck (R.E.M.).

The first single, "Mr. E's Beautiful Blues", was co-written by Simpson. The song was not intended to be on the album, but the record company insisted on its inclusion. Therefore, it was not featured on the track listing but was instead listed on the cover sticker as a bonus track, separated from the rest of the album by 20 seconds of silence.

To promote Daisies of the Galaxy, another tour took place across the United States and Europe, with the band also playing their first concerts in Australia. For these performances, Eels were transformed into a 6-piece orchestra, including Lisa Germano and Probyn Gregory. E also played some solo shows, opening for Fiona Apple.

=== Souljacker and Shootenanny! ===
In 2001, Souljacker was released, an album with a heavier feel and more rock-oriented sound than Daisies of the Galaxy. John Parish, previously of PJ Harvey's band, co-wrote most of the songs and played guitar on the album and first part of the tour. After Parish became a father, he was replaced with Joe Gore for the American leg of the Bus Driving, Band Rocking Tour. Koool G Murder played bass and keyboards and joined Eels on tour.

2003 marked the release of the album Shootenanny!. E now refers to the album as a break from recording the following Blinking Lights album. It was recorded live in the studio in only ten days. "Saturday Morning" was released as a single.

Butch was replaced on drums by Puddin'. In 2003, Eels embarked upon another big tour, called the Tour of Duty. The live band consisted of E, Goldenboy (guitar), Koool G Murder (bass) and Puddin' (drums). Later that year, E composed the score for the film Levity.

=== Blinking Lights and Other Revelations and Eels with Strings ===
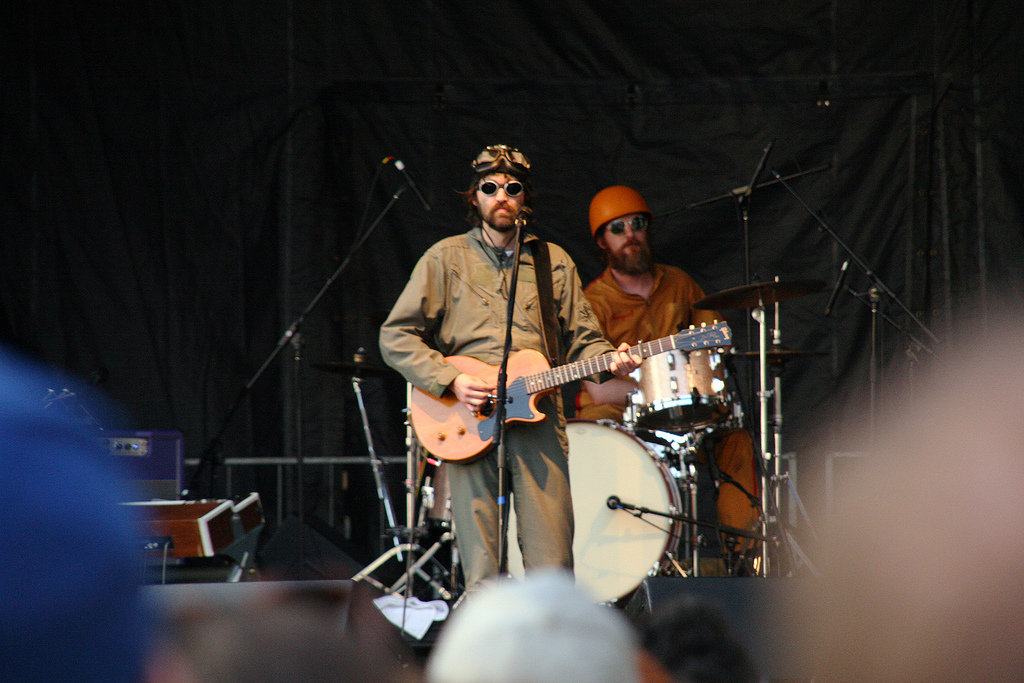
Eels in 2006, back as a rock combo after a string quartet tour

Eels' next album, Blinking Lights and Other Revelations, was released on April 26, 2005, and was the band's first release for new label Vagrant Records. It is a 33-track double album. Contributions were made by Tom Waits, Peter Buck, John Sebastian (The Lovin' Spoonful), Jim Jacobsen, and Butch.

The first tour in support of the Blinking Lights album, billed as Eels with Strings, featured primarily performances by E on acoustic guitar, organ or piano, backed by Allen "Big Al" Hunter on piano and upright bass, Jeffrey Lyster (also known as Chet Atkins III or "The Chet") on guitar, mandolin, pedal steel, musical saw and drums, and a string quartet consisting of violinists Paloma Udovic and Julie Carpenter, violist Heather Lockie and cellist Ana Lenchantin. The tour resulted in a live album, Eels with Strings: Live at Town Hall, recorded in New York City. The performance includes tracks from all of their albums, and was released on CD and DVD on February 21, 2006.

=== Meet the Eels: Essential Eels Vol. I and Useless Trinkets ===
In early 2008, Eels released their first "greatest hits" compilation as well as a compilation of B-sides, rarities, soundtrack singles and unreleased tracks. Meet the Eels: Essential Eels Vol. I spans the first decade of the Eels, including singles from all their albums, as well as a DVD featuring music videos and one live performance video. Useless Trinkets contains 50 B-sides and rarities and a DVD of their Lollapalooza 2006 performances. To promote the releases, the band went on a world tour, An Evening With Eels. This time, only the Chet joined E on stage, both playing a broad cross-section from the Eels repertoire on a variety of instruments. The concerts also featured the Chet reading excerpts from E's 2008 autobiography, Things the Grandchildren Should Know. On this tour, the band released a live CD/DVD package of Eels' 2006 performance at the London Astoria, Live and in Person!, documenting a show from the second tour in support of Blinking Lights and Other Revelations.

The soundtrack of the 2008 comedy film Yes Man features nine songs by Eels, including "Man Up", a brand new song.

=== Concept album trilogy: Hombre Lobo, End Times, and Tomorrow Morning ===
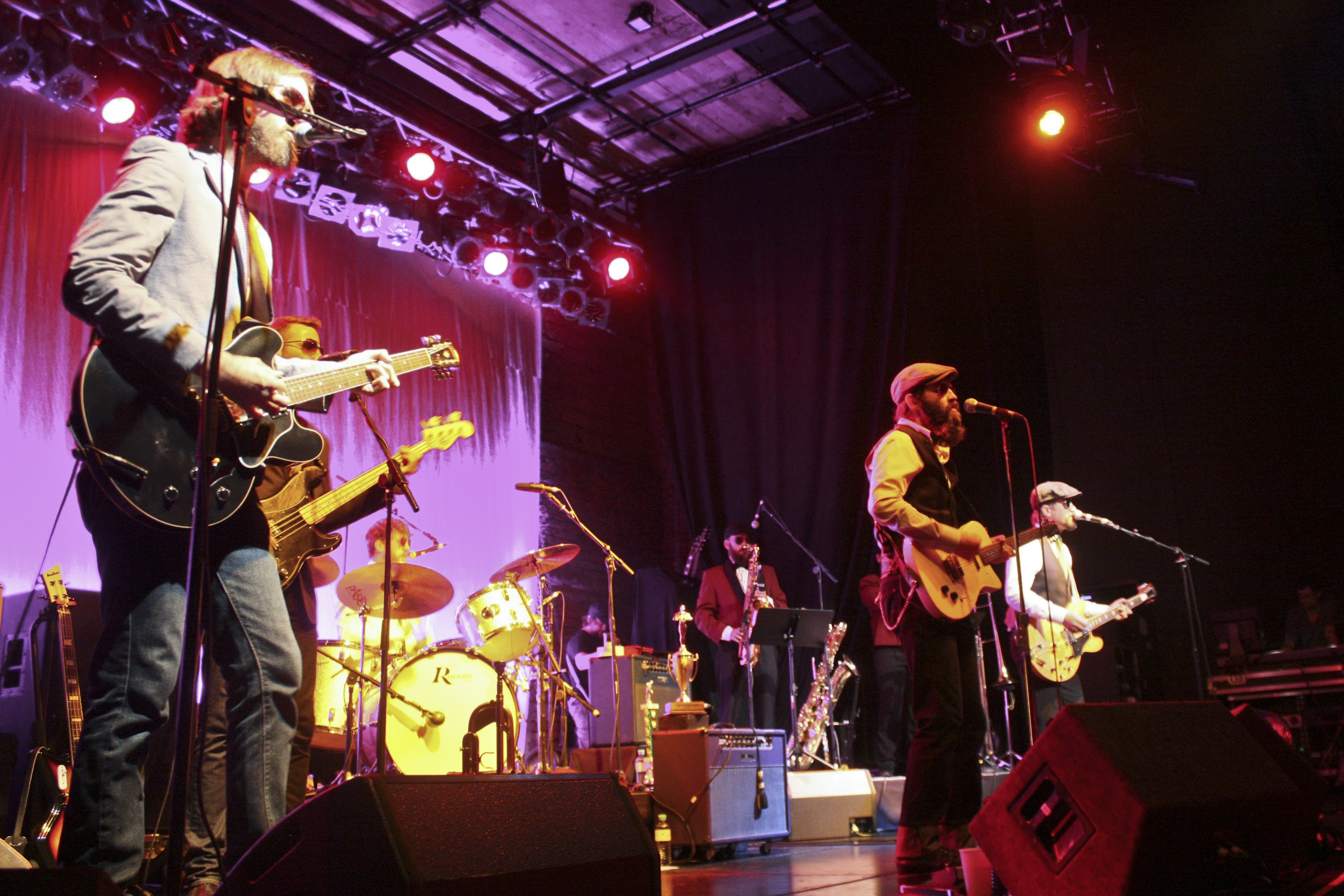
Eels in 2011

Hombre Lobo, the seventh Eels studio album, was released on June 2, 2009. The album comprises twelve new songs. "Hombre Lobo" is Spanish for "wolf man" or "werewolf" and references E's unusually long beard, which he originally grew when writing the song "Dog Faced Boy". On March 31, 2009, the band made the track "Fresh Blood" available on Spinner, explaining that the song would be the lead single for the album. A Jesse Dylan-directed music video was released on April 29, 2009, as well, and the track would become the theme song of the 2015 HBO documentary miniseries The Jinx. The album was released as a single-disc CD and a deluxe edition with a DVD. In September 2009, Eels released a music video for "That Look You Give That Guy", featuring Bobby Jr., E and Top Chef host Padma Lakshmi.

While promoting this album, Eels released the live EP The Myspace Transmissions Session 2009 on October 14, 2009. That same day, the band's website announced that a new Eels album entitled End Times would be released on January 19, 2010. It was largely recorded on a four-track recorder and is based on the themes of broken love. Three album tracks—"Little Bird", "In My Younger Days", and "A Line in the Dirt"—were made available as music videos or promotional downloads prior to the release of the album. Once again, Butch contributed drums to "A Line in the Dirt". On January 19, 2010, End Times was released. E made no comment on touring and there was no tour scheduled to begin.

A second album was announced on May 20, 2010: Tomorrow Morning was described as the "final installment of a trilogy that began with Hombre Lobo and End Times." The three albums respectively explore themes of desire, loss, and redemption. A world tour, the first since 2007's An Evening With Eels tour, was announced at the same time. This tour once again featured the Chet on various instruments, alongside Koool G Murder on bass, trilogy drummer Knuckles on drums and a new member, P-Boo, on guitar.

=== Wonderful, Glorious and The Cautionary Tales of Mark Oliver Everett ===
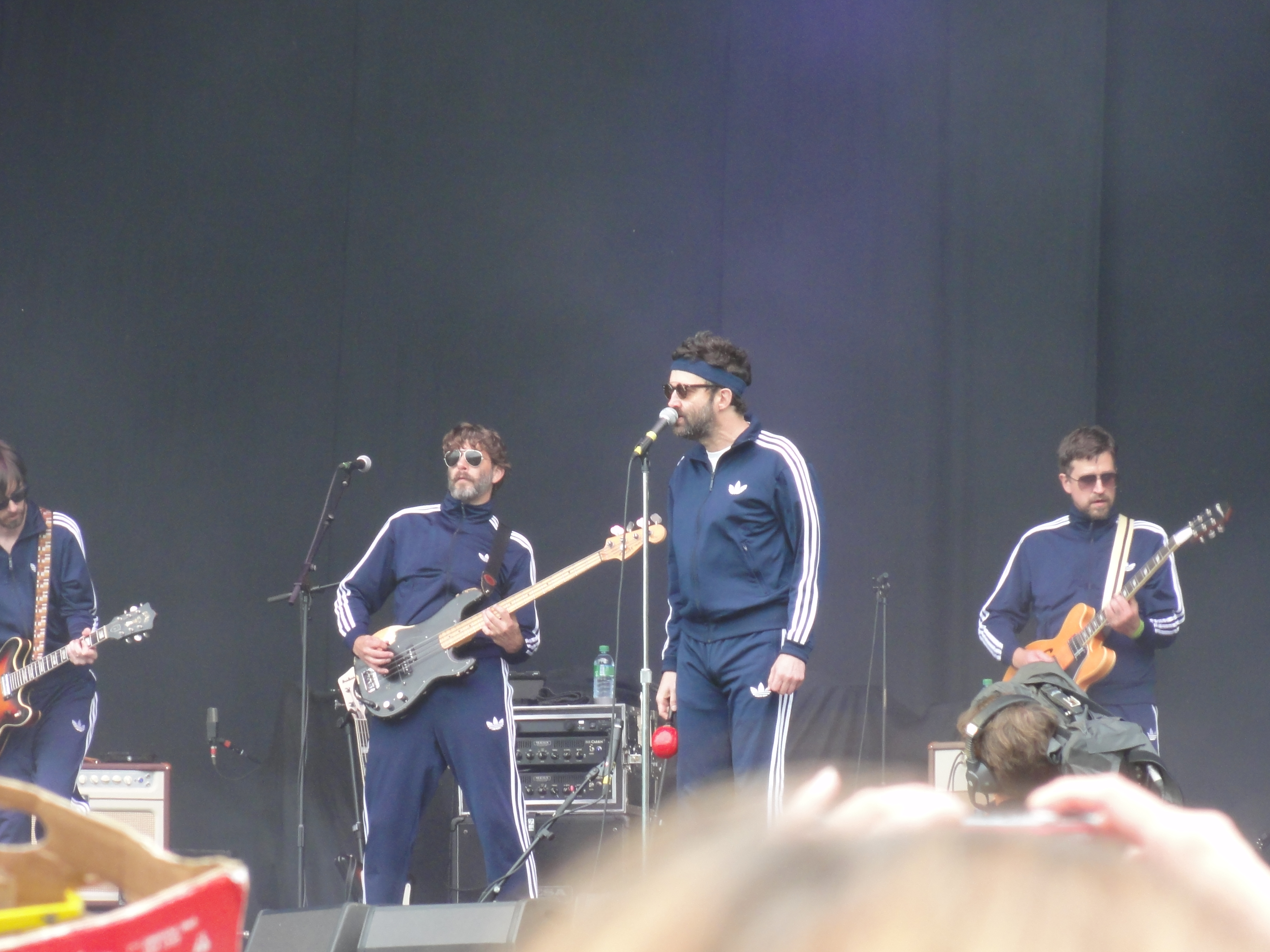
Eels in 2013

Eels (Crazy Al, The Chet, E, Knuckles, and P-Boo) in Paris in 2013

On February 5, 2013, the 10th Eels studio album was released, entitled Wonderful, Glorious. The first single from the album, "Peach Blossom", premiered on SoundCloud on November 6, 2012. A month later, on December 4, 2012, the official video was released on Stereogum. The second single, "New Alphabet", was streamed pre-release on December 12, 2012, on Spinner

On March 25, 2013, the band released a parody music video called "Cold Dead Hand" through Funny or Die, with Jim Carrey replacing E on vocals. The song and video, set as a musical act during the variety program Hee Haw, lampoons American gun culture, and specifically Charlton Heston, former President of the National Rifle Association of America.

Eels' eleventh studio album, The Cautionary Tales of Mark Oliver Everett, was released on April 21, 2014, on E Works Records. In April 2015, the band released the DVD and double live album Live at the Royal Albert Hall.

In 2015, Eels created their own version of Melanie De Biasio's track "I Feel You" for the album Gilles Peterson Presents – No Deal Remixed. The track was later used to promote the 2017 film Alien: Covenant, directed by Ridley Scott, and appears during the entire in-universe short movie Meet Walter starring Michael Fassbender.

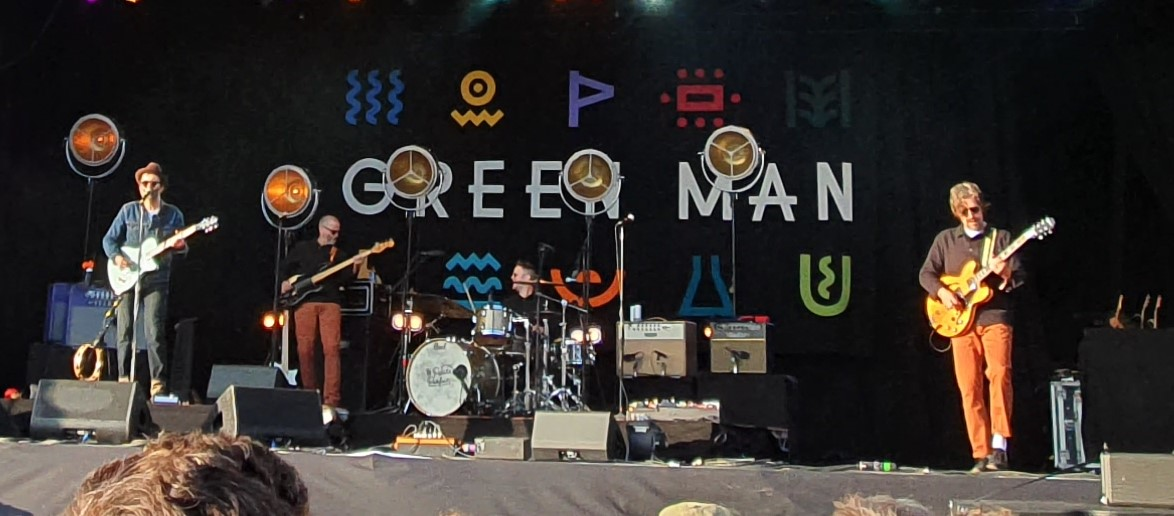
Eels performing at the Green man Festival in August 2019

=== The Deconstruction and Earth to Dora ===
On January 17, 2018, Eels announced their 12th studio album, The Deconstruction, to be released on April 6, 2018, their first in nearly four years. They also announced a supporting tour throughout the United States and Europe, beginning in Pomona, California on May 28, 2018. The album travels through many styles sonically, but its lyrics primarily deal with rebuilding one's life and looking back on what went wrong. Singles include (in release order) the title track, "Today Is the Day", "Premonition", and "Bone Dry". Styles present on the album include orchestral pop, power pop, psychedelic pop/rock, indie/alternative rock and post-modern pop.

The band's next release was the single "Baby Let's Make It Real"/"Who You Say You Are", announced on September 1, 2020. These songs were featured on the subsequent studio album, Earth to Dora (2020).

=== Extreme Witchcraft and Eels Time! ===
On September 21, 2021, it was announced that the 14th Eels album would be called Extreme Witchcraft and would be released on January 28, 2022. The album was produced by E and John Parish in their first collaboration since 2001's Souljacker. Eels So Good: Essential Eels, Vol. 2 (2007–2020) came out in late 2023. On February 29, 2024, the band announced Eels Time!, which was released on June 7.

=== Cookie Happened ===
In June 2026, the band released "Cap In Hand" as the lead single for their 16th album, Cookie Happened. The album is scheduled for release on October 16, 2026. The band cited the Sesame Street character Cookie Monster as an influence on the album.

== Members ==
Eels have had a number of lineup changes supporting E since their formation, and in recent years the live band has often differed from the musicians on the albums. Koool G Murder has been credited on bass and production on recent albums, although Big Al has fulfilled the role of bassist during the live shows.

== Discography ==
- Beautiful Freak (1996)
- Electro-Shock Blues (1998)
- Daisies of the Galaxy (2000)
- Souljacker (2001)
- Shootenanny! (2003)
- Blinking Lights and Other Revelations (2005)
- Hombre Lobo (2009)
- End Times (2010)
- Tomorrow Morning (2010)
- Wonderful, Glorious (2013)
- The Cautionary Tales of Mark Oliver Everett (2014)
- The Deconstruction (2018)
- Earth to Dora (2020)
- Extreme Witchcraft (2022)
- Eels Time! (2024)
- Cookie Happened (2026)
