= Jonathan Norton =

American musician (born 1958)

Butch Norton
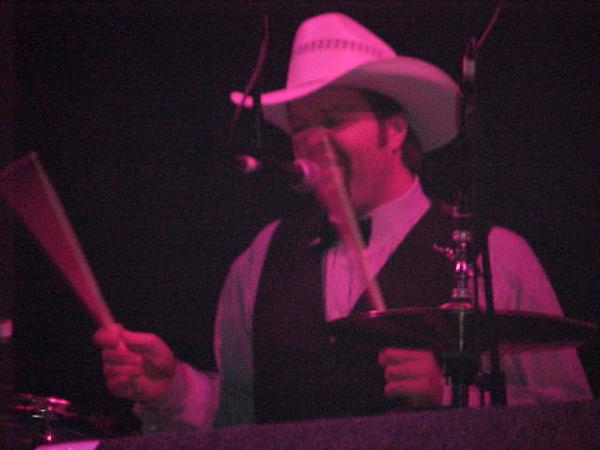
- Butch drumming with Eels in 2000

Background information
- Also known as: Butch
- Born: Jonathan Norton; March 21, 1958 (age 68); Inglewood, California, U.S.
- Origin: Los Angeles, California, U.S.
- Genres: Rock
- Occupations: Drummer, percussionist, record producer
- Instruments: Drums, percussion, vocals, bird calls
- Label: DreamWorks
- Website: www.butchdrums.com

Jonathan Hayes "Butch" Norton (born March 21, 1958) is an American drummer, percussionist and vocalist, best known for his work with the Los Angeles–based indie rock band Eels between 1996 and 2003. Since his departure from the group, he has gone on to work with notable musicians like Fiona Apple, Tracy Chapman, Lisa Germano, Aimee Mann, Michael Miller, Michael Penn, Rufus Wainwright, and Lucinda Williams.

== Biography ==
=== Early life ===
Norton was raised in the San Francisco Bay area, and began studying the drums at a young age. Classically trained by renowned San Francisco symphony percussionist, Anthony Cirone, Butch began performing in nightclubs at the age of 17.

In 1980 he relocated to Southern California to study with master percussionist, John Bergamo at California Institute of the Arts. His focus was World Music and percussion. Norton composed and performed with Loretta Livingston and Dancers for the “Music Center on Tour” educational outreach program, and started a long affiliation with Bella Lewitsky. He was a founding member of the world percussion trio, Sugba Sugba, facilitating healing rituals through rhythm and movement concerts on the West Coast. He appeared in the Mike Kelly/Steve Prina/Anita Pace production of Beat of the Traps which premiered in Vienna, Austria at the very first “Wiener Fest Wochen Art Festival”. Norton has performed with Native American Shaman and other musicians in the annual spring healing ritual on Mount Tamalpais in San Francisco, with Anna Halprin.

== Career ==
=== Eels ===
In 1993, Norton met eels front man Mark Oliver Everett, better known as "E", and toured with him in support of his second solo album called "Broken Toy Shop" on Polygram records. Eels was officially founded when Norton and E met Tommy Walter. In 1996 the band released their debut album Beautiful Freak, a melancholy pop record with tormented lyrics. The singles "Novocaine for the Soul", "Susan's House" and "Your Lucky Day in Hell" achieved modest national and international success, winning the Best International Breakthrough Act award at the 1998 BRIT Awards. Their first video, "Novocaine for the Soul", was directed by Mark Romanek and garnered several nominations for "Video of the Year". Norton continued with E and Eels through four more albums.

=== Lucinda Williams ===
Norton has been performing with Lucinda Williams as her permanent drummer in the studio, and on tour since 2007. In 2008, they went into the studio and recorded Williams's ninth studio album Little Honey, which was nominated for a Grammy Award. Norton and the other bandmates formed a side project called “Buick 6”, which recorded their own album with the same title. Buick 6 opened for Williams on tour. In 2010, Williams and her band recorded Blessed and toured in support of the album in 2011.

Norton recorded and toured with many other artists, including Lowen & Navarro, fellow DreamWorks artist Rufus Wainwright, and Tracy Chapman on the “Let It Rain” Tour, among others.

Norton plays drums, percussion and sound effects on soundtracks for various films.

== Equipment ==
Norton uses Pork Pie Percussion Drums.

== Discography ==
- Broken Moon – Lowen & Navarro (1993)
- Beautiful Freak – eels (1996)
- Figure 8 – Julia Darling (1997)
- Electro-Shock Blues – eels (1998)
- When the Pawn... – Fiona Apple (1999)
- Daisies of the Galaxy – eels (2000)
- Poses – Rufus Wainwright (2000)
- Souljacker – eels (2001)
- I Am the Messiah – MC Honky (2002)
- Let It Rain – Tracy Chapman (2002)
- Shootenanny! – eels (2003)
- La vache qui pleure – Kate & Anna McGarrigle (2003)
- Lullaby For Liquid Pig – Lisa Germano (2004)
- Safe in Sound – Jim Boggia (2005)
- Blinking Lights and Other Revelations – eels (2005)
- Blink the Brightest – Tracy Bonham (2005)
- Fresh Wine For My Horses – Rob Dickinson (2005)
- Where I Come From – Rich Ferguson (2006)
- Gather Up – Peter Bradley Adams (2006)
- Von Scheibbs bis Nebraska – Georg Danzer (2006)
- Hope Waits – Hope Waits (2007)
- Palms & Runes, Tarot & Tea: A Michael Penn Collection – Michael Penn (2007)
- A Tribute to Fats Domino – Goin Home – various artists (2007)
- Little Honey – Lucinda Williams (2008)
- Buick 6 – Buick 6 (2008)
- Awake and Dreaming – Courtney Jones (2008)
- Meet the Eels – Essential eels vol. 1 1996–2006 – eels (2008)
- Useless Trinkets – Rarities Compilation 1996–2006 – eels (2008)
- Future Sons & Daughters – AM (2009)
- Blessed – Lucinda Williams (2011)
- Cast Your Stone – Walter Rose (2012)
- The Absence of Fear - Simon Lynge (2015)
- Shed My Skin – Dan Navarro (2018)
