= Blinking Lights and Other Revelations =

Studio album by Eels
- Released: April 26, 2005
- Recorded: 1998–2004
- Studio: OneHitsville, Silverlake, California, United States; additional recording at Knobworld, Tracktown, O'Henry and The Bomb Factory Conway Studios Hollywood
- Genre: Indie rock
- Length: 91:48
- Label: Vagrant
- Producer: E

Eels chronology
| Shootenanny! (2003) | Blinking Lights and Other Revelations (2005) | Hombre Lobo (2009) |

Singles from Blinking Lights and Other Revelations
- 1. "Hey Man (Now You're Really Living)" Released: March 22, 2005

Manchester 2005 cover
- Cover to the live EP Manchester 2005, packaged with the deluxe edition of the album

Blinking Lights and Other Revelations is the sixth studio album by American band Eels. It was recorded over the space of 1998 to 2004 and released on April 26, 2005 through record label Vagrant, his first album on a new label following Eels' departure from DreamWorks Records.

A 33-track double album, Blinking Lights has been seen as one of frontman E's most personal records, and was met with some of the strongest critical reviews of his career. The album features guest appearances by Tom Waits, Peter Buck and John Sebastian. It would also be the last album to feature the band's original drummer Jonathan "Butch" Norton.

== Background ==
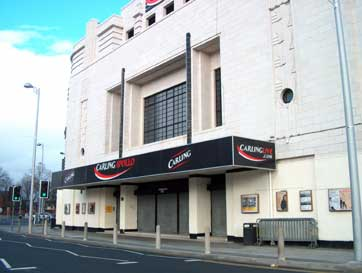
England's Manchester Apollo was the venue for the bonus live album Manchester 2005

Eels frontman E described Blinking Lights on the official website as being about "God and all the questions related to the subject of God. It's also about hanging on to my remaining shreds of sanity and the blue sky that comes the day after a terrible storm, and it's a love letter to life itself, in all its beautiful, horrible glory."

The sleeve and liner notes are composed of typewritten lyrics and family photos.

== Release ==
In January 2005, it was reported that Eels had signed to Vagrant Records, who planned to release the band's next album later that year. The track listing and artwork was posted online on April 6, 2005. The album was released through Vagrant Records on April 26, 2005, following the dissolution of Eels' contract with DreamWorks Records and the label's eventual take-over by Universal Music Group. They played two shows in the US, before embarking on a tour of Europe in May and June 2005. They toured the US in May and 2006, prior to a Europe tour, which lasted until July 2006 and featured a performance at the Wireless Festival. In August 2006, they appeared at the Lollapalooza festival.

On October 21, 2008, the band announced that 2,500 autographed copies of the album would be published on vinyl. The songs were split across three records, with a fourth record serving as the bonus album Manchester 2005. The band made four of those tracks available as a free download for a week within announcing the album.

== Critical reception ==
Professional ratings
Aggregate scores
| Source | Rating |
|---|---|
| Metacritic | 85/100 |
Review scores
| Source | Rating |
| AllMusic | 4/5 stars |
| Entertainment Weekly | A |
| The Guardian | 4/5 stars |
| Los Angeles Times | 3.5/4 stars |
| Mojo | 4/5 stars |
| NME | 8/10 |
| Pitchfork | 6.5/10 |
| Q | 4/5 stars |
| Rolling Stone | 3.5/5 stars |
| Uncut | 4/5 stars |

Blinking Lights and Other Revelations was met with critical acclaim. On Metacritic, the album has a weighted average score of 85 out of 100 based on 28 reviews, indicating "universal acclaim".

Mark Horan of PopMatters wrote, "E is one of the best songwriters America has to offer, and he has made as personal, poignant and ultimately redeeming an album that you are ever going to hear." Entertainment Weekly wrote, "Everett finally delivers the absolute stone masterpiece fans have always known lurked inside his dour heart." Under the Radar called it "some of the best-written songs of this new century".

== Track listing ==
All tracks are written by E, except where noted.

Disc one
| No. | Title | Writer(s) | Length |
|---|---|---|---|
| 1. | "Theme from Blinking Lights" | | 1:44 |
| 2. | "From Which I Came/A Magic World" | | 3:13 |
| 3. | "Son of a Bitch" | E; Jim Lang | 2:27 |
| 4. | "Blinking Lights (For Me)" | | 2:01 |
| 5. | "Trouble with Dreams" | | 4:33 |
| 6. | "Marie Floating Over the Backyard" | | 2:03 |
| 7. | "Suicide Life" | | 2:41 |
| 8. | "In the Yard, Behind the Church" | | 4:05 |
| 9. | "Railroad Man" | | 4:16 |
| 10. | "The Other Shoe" | | 2:32 |
| 11. | "Last Time We Spoke" | | 2:22 |
| 12. | "Mother Mary" | | 3:21 |
| 13. | "Going Fetal" | | 2:21 |
| 14. | "Understanding Salesmen" | | 2:43 |
| 15. | "Theme for a Pretty Girl That Makes You Believe God Exists" | | 2:06 |
| 16. | "Checkout Blues" | | 2:27 |
| 17. | "Blinking Lights (For You)" | | 2:00 |
| Total length: | | | 44:55 |

Disc two
| No. | Title | Writer(s) | Length |
|---|---|---|---|
| 1. | "Dust of Ages" | E; Jim Jacobsen | 2:21 |
| 2. | "Old Shit/New Shit" | | 3:17 |
| 3. | "Bride of Theme from Blinking Lights" | | 1:52 |
| 4. | "Hey Man (Now You're Really Living)" | | 3:02 |
| 5. | "I'm Going to Stop Pretending That I Didn't Break Your Heart" | | 3:56 |
| 6. | "To Lick Your Boots" | Peter Buck; E | 3:30 |
| 7. | "If You See Natalie" | | 3:41 |
| 8. | "Sweet Li'l Thing" | | 3:27 |
| 9. | "Dusk: A Peach in the Orchard" | E; John Sebastian | 1:17 |
| 10. | "Whatever Happened to Soy Bomb" | | 2:26 |
| 11. | "Ugly Love" | | 2:58 |
| 12. | "God's Silence" | | 1:26 |
| 13. | "Losing Streak" | | 2:52 |
| 14. | "Last Days of My Bitter Heart" | | 1:35 |
| 15. | "The Stars Shine in the Sky Tonight" | E; Jim Lang | 3:31 |
| 16. | "Things the Grandchildren Should Know" | | 5:22 |
| Total length: | | | 46:53 |

=== Manchester 2005 ===
This live album is only available on disc four of the deluxe edition of Blinking Lights and Other Revelations. The songs were recorded on October 13, 2005, in Manchester at the Manchester Apollo.

1. "Fresh Feeling"
2. "Packing Blankets"
3. "Bride of Theme from Blinking Lights"
4. "From Which I Came/A Magic World"
5. "Son of a Bitch"
6. "Ant Farm"
7. "Jeannie's Diary"
8. "My Beloved Monster"
9. "It's a Motherfucker"
10. "Taking a Bath in Rust"
11. "Trouble with Dreams"
12. "I'm Going to Stop Pretending That I Didn't Break Your Heart"
13. "Dead of Winter"
14. "Flyswatter"
15. "Novocaine for the Soul"
16. "Losing Streak"
17. "Climbing to the Moon"

== Personnel ==
Eels

- E – vocals, guitar, keyboards, melodica, production
- Butch – drums, percussion
- The Chet – guitar
- Koool G. Murder – bass guitar
- Puddin' – drums

Additional musicians

- Wayne Bergeron – trumpet
- Bobby, Jr. – "wails" ("Last Time We Spoke")
- Peter Buck – guitar ("To Lick Your Boots", "If You See Natalie")
- Matt DeMerritt – saxophone
- Ludvig Girdland – violin
- Joe Gore – guitar
- Probyn Gregory – horns
- David Hlebo – saxophone
- Jim Jacobsen – keyboards, horn, string arrangements, programming
- Jim Lang – strings, mixing
- Bill Liston – woodwinds
- Andy Martin – trombone
- Joe Meyer – horn
- Dick Mitchell – flute
- John Sebastian – organ ("Dusk: A Peach in the Orchard")
- Todd Simon – trumpet
- Gerri Sutyak – cello
- Michael Valerio – bass guitar
- Tom Waits – vocals ("Going Fetal")

Technical

- Michael Aarvold – mixing
- Ryan Boesch – mixing, programming
- Robert Carranza – mixing
- Greg Collins – mixing
- Wally Gagel – mixing
- Koool G. Murder – mixing, programming
- Dan Pinder – mixing
- Brendan Willard – mixing

== Charts ==
=== Weekly charts ===
Sales chart performance for Blinking Lights and Other Revelations
| Chart (2005) | Peak position |
|---|---|
| Australian Albums (ARIA) | 42 |
| Austrian Albums (Ö3 Austria) | 42 |
| Belgian Albums (Ultratop Flanders) | 7 |
| Belgian Albums (Ultratop Wallonia) | 46 |
| Danish Albums (Hitlisten) | 34 |
| Dutch Albums (Album Top 100) | 18 |
| French Albums (SNEP) | 38 |
| German Albums (Offizielle Top 100) | 30 |
| Irish Albums (IRMA) | 11 |
| Italian Albums (FIMI) | 25 |
| Norwegian Albums (VG-lista) | 26 |
| Spanish Albums (Promusicae) | 100 |
| Swiss Albums (Schweizer Hitparade) | 18 |
| UK Albums (OCC) | 16 |
| US Billboard 200 | 93 |

=== Year-end charts ===
Year-end chart performance for Blinking Lights and Other Revelations
| Chart (2005) | Position |
|---|---|
| Belgian Albums (Ultratop Flanders) | 67 |
