= Daisies of the Galaxy =

Studio album by Eels
- Released: February 28, 2000
- Recorded: March–October 1999
- Studios: Onehitsville, Conway Studios Hollywood
- Genres: Indie rock; indie pop; alternative pop
- Length: 44:09
- Label: DreamWorks
- Producer: E

Eels chronology
Electro-Shock Blues (1998)	Daisies of the Galaxy (2000)	Souljacker (2001)

Singles from Daisies of the Galaxy
- 1. "Mr. E's Beautiful Blues" Released: February 14, 2000; 2. "Flyswatter" Released: June 5, 2000; 3. "Jeannie's Diary" Released: 2000 (promo)

Daisies of the Galaxy is the third studio album by American rock band Eels. It was released on February 28, 2000 in the United Kingdom and on March 14 in the United States by the record label DreamWorks. It reached number eight in the UK Albums Chart.

== Production ==
When the band's label requested that a clean version of "It's a Motherfucker" be recorded, the song was re-written as "It's a Monster Trucker", with modified lyrics and sound clips of lead singer Mark Oliver "E" Everett speaking "trucker lingo" on a CB radio.

== Release ==
The single "Mr. E's Beautiful Blues" peaked at number 11 in the UK Singles Chart; the second single to be released from the album, "Flyswatter", charted at number 55 in the UK Singles Chart and was later covered by the indie pop trio Smoosh.

== Reception ==
Professional ratings
Review scores
Source	Rating
AllMusic	3/5 stars
Entertainment Weekly	A−
The Guardian	3/5 stars
Los Angeles Times	3.5/4 stars
Melody Maker	4/5 stars
NME	9/10
Q	4/5 stars
Rolling Stone	3.5/5 stars
Spin	6/10
Uncut	4/5 stars

Daisies of the Galaxy received a generally favorable response from critics.

Fred Kovey of PopMatters called it "a fine pop record in an era that seems uninterested in pop unless it’s marketed with dance steps and a quicky [sic] bio. Though not the equal of the best work of Stephen Merritt [sic] or Elliot Smith [sic], Daisies of the Galaxy is worthy of attention by alterna-pop fans and anyone else desperate for catchy music for grown-ups."

Stephen Thomas Erlewine of AllMusic wrote: "Unlike its predecessor, the album doesn't play like [E's] private diary; instead, it feels as if one is rummaging through his sketchbook. And, like many sketchbooks, some moments have blossomed, and others remain just intriguing, unformed ideas. For the dedicated, it's worth sifting through the album to find the keepers, since there are enough moments of quirky genius. But not all longtime fans will find this rewarding, since [E] has spent more time in creating mood than crafting songs. There are very few melodies that resonate like his best work, and the stripped-down, yet eccentric production – sounding much like a cross between Jon Brion and Beck – never feels realized."

In a retrospective review for Stylus Magazine, Ben Woolhead described Daisies of the Galaxy as "a very special collection of songs indeed".

== Track listing ==
All tracks are written by E, except where noted.

No.	Title	Writer(s)	Length
1.	"Grace Kelly Blues"		3:38
2.	"Packing Blankets"		2:07
3.	"The Sound of Fear"		3:33
4.	"I Like Birds"		2:35
5.	"Daisies of the Galaxy"		3:27
6.	"Flyswatter"		3:20
7.	"It's a Motherfucker (Note: An edited version of the album was also released on the American market with "It's a Motherfucker" replaced by "It's a Monster Trucker".)"		2:14
8.	"Estate Sale"	E; Peter Buck	1:36
9.	"Tiger in My Tank"		3:07
10.	"A Daisy Through Concrete"		2:26
11.	"Jeannie's Diary"		3:37
12.	"Wooden Nickels"		2:55
13.	"Something Is Sacred"		2:52
14.	"Selective Memory"		2:44
15.	"Mr. E's Beautiful Blues" (hidden track)	E; Michael Simpson	3:58
Total length:			44:09

Japanese edition bonus track
No.	Title	Length
16.	"Birdgirl on a Cell Phone"	3:09
Total length:		47:18

== Personnel ==
Eels

- Butch – drums, backing vocals
- E – vocals, guitar, electric bass, Wurlitzer organ, production, sleeve art direction, mixing

Additional musicians

- David Alvarez – drums
- Peter Buck – guitar
- Wayne Bergeron – horn
- Chris Bleth – horn
- Andy Martin – horn
- Grant-Lee Phillips – guitar

Technical

- Jim Lang – engineering, horn and string arrangements, mixing
- Bob Ludwig – mastering
- Mickey Petralia – programming, engineering
- Francesca Restrepo – sleeve design and art direction
- Jeffrey Shannon – engineering
- Michael Simpson – production, engineering, mixing
- James Stone – engineering
- Adrian Tomine – sleeve illustrations

== Charts ==
Sales chart performance for Daises of the Galaxy
Chart (2000)	Peak position
Australian Albums (ARIA)	38
Belgian Albums (Ultratop Flanders)	8
Dutch Albums (Album Top 100)	34
French Albums (SNEP)	40
German Albums (Offizielle Top 100)	49
Irish Albums (IRMA)	24
Norwegian Albums (VG-lista)	21
Swiss Albums (Schweizer Hitparade)	69
UK Albums (Official Charts)	8

== Certifications ==
Sales certifications for Daisies of the Galaxy
Region	Certification	Certified units/sales
Australia (ARIA)	Gold	35,000^{‡}
Belgium (BRMA)	Gold	25,000^{*}
United Kingdom (BPI)	Gold	100,000^{^}
^{*} Sales figures based on certification alone.^{^} Shipments figures based on certification alone.^{‡} Sales+streaming figures based on certification alone.
