= Souljacker =

Studio album by Eels
- Released: September 19, 2001
- Recorded: December 2000 – July 2001
- Studios: Onehitsville, Conway Studios Hollywood
- Genres: Alternative rock, hard rock
- Length: 40:20
- Label: DreamWorks
- Producers: E and John Parish

Eels chronology
Daisies of the Galaxy (2000)	Souljacker (2001)	Levity (2002)

Singles from Souljacker
- 1. "Souljacker Part I" Released: September 10, 2001

Souljacker is the fourth studio album by American rock band Eels, first released on September 19, 2001, in Japan and later on March 12, 2002, in the United States. The album reached No.12 on the UK Album Charts

"Souljacker Part I" was released as a single and reached No. 30 in the UK Singles Chart.

== Content ==
Unlike some of Mark Oliver Everett's other albums, most notably Electro-Shock Blues, Souljacker is mostly based on stories of others rather than on Everett's own life. Characters were inspired from various sources, including circus freaks ("Dog Faced Boy") and a recording engineer with an abusive past ("Bus Stop Boxer"). German director Wim Wenders called "Woman Driving, Man Sleeping" his favorite Eels song and he used it in the segment he directed for Ten Minutes Older. Wenders directed the video for "Souljacker Part I".

The strings used in the song "Fresh Feeling" were sampled from another Eels song, "Selective Memory" from Daisies of the Galaxy.

== Critical reception ==
Professional ratings
Aggregate scores
Source	Rating
Metacritic	73/100
Review scores
Source	Rating
AllMusic	3/5 stars
Alternative Press	4/5 stars
The Austin Chronicle	2/5 stars
Blender	3/5 stars
NME	7/10
Pitchfork	4.9/10
Playlouder	4/5 stars
Q	4/5 stars
Rolling Stone	3.5/5 stars
The Rolling Stone Album Guide	3/5 stars

Souljacker received a generally favorable reception from critics, with several reviewers comparing the album's sound to that of Beck. Q said "Everyone will say this sounds like Beck, but at the last count Beck would be lucky to sound like Eels." PopMatters wrote, "Souljacker is as strong as any of Eels previous albums, but even crawling through the muck there is a lot more joy and life here than heard before." NME wrote, "Souljacker's songs rock harder than most of E's nu metal enemies. But what's really terrifying is that E's just warming up. The next album will be a killer – and probably feature one on backing vocals."

Pitchfork was critical, writing, "Beyond the melodies that don't stick in my head and the beats that don't make me want to dance, the only real problem with Souljacker [...] is that it just seems like an underachievement."

== Legacy ==
The second track on the album, "That's Not Really Funny", was used as the theme tune to all three series of the BBC's animated comedy Monkey Dust.

"Fresh Feeling" was featured in Scrubs episode "My Hero", as well as the Chuck episode "Chuck Versus the Truth", and the movie Failure To Launch.

== Track listing ==
All tracks are written by E; additional writers in brackets.

No.	Title	Writer(s)	Length
1.	"Dog Faced Boy"	E; John Parish	3:17
2.	"That's Not Really Funny"	E; John Parish	3:19
3.	"Fresh Feeling"	E; Koool G Murder	3:37
4.	"Woman Driving, Man Sleeping"	E; John Parish	3:30
5.	"Souljacker Part I"	E; Butch; Adam Siegel	3:15
6.	"Friendly Ghost"	E	3:22
7.	"Teenage Witch"	E; John Parish	4:44
8.	"Bus Stop Boxer"	E; John Parish	3:42
9.	"Jungle Telegraph"	E	3:39
10.	"World of Shit"	E; John Parish	3:29
11.	"Souljacker Part II"	E	1:58
12.	"What Is This Note?"	E; John Parish	2:28
Total length:			40:20

=== Bonus discs ===
==== 22 Miles of Hard Road ====
All tracks are written by E, except where noted.

No.	Title	Writer(s)	Release	Length
1.	"I Write the B-Sides"		United Kingdom	3:55
2.	"Hidden Track"			4:25
3.	"Jehovah's Witness"	E; John Parish		3:39
4.	"Mr. E's Beautiful Remix" (Butch 'n' Joey remix)			3:53
Total length:				56:12

==== Rotten World Blues ====
All tracks are written by E, except where noted.

No.	Title	Writer(s)	Release	Length
1.	"I Write the B-Sides"		United States	3:55
2.	"Hidden Track"			4:25
3.	"Jehovah's Witness"	E; John Parish		3:39
4.	"Rotten World Blues"			2:44
Total length:				55:03

== Personnel ==
Eels

- Butch – drums and percussion
- E – vocals, guitar, baritone guitar, piano, clavinet, Mellotron, and Wurlitzer organ
- Joe Gore – Guitar (Tracks 8 & 12)
- Koool G Murder – synthesizer, bass guitar, guitar, clavinet
- John Parish – guitar, percussion, drums, keyboards, melodica, and stylophone
- Adam Siegel – bass guitar (Track 5)

Production

- Ryan Boesch – programming, engineering, and mixing
- Greg Collins – tape transfer
- DJ Killingspree – liner notes
- E – production, art direction, and mixing
- Brian Gardner – mastering
- Chris Justice – engineering
- Koool G Murder – engineering
- Jim Lang – string arrangements
- John Parish – programming, production, engineering, and mixing
- Dan Pinder – technical assistance
- Francesca Restrepo – art direction
- Rocky Schenck – photography

== Charts ==
Chart performance for Souljacker
Chart (2001)	Peak position
Australian Albums (ARIA)	39
Austrian Albums (Ö3 Austria)	34
Belgian Albums (Ultratop Flanders)	15
Belgian Albums (Ultratop Wallonia)	22
Dutch Albums (Album Top 100)	56
French Albums (SNEP)	34
German Albums (Offizielle Top 100)	47
Irish Albums (IRMA)	19
Italian Albums (FIMI)	41
Norwegian Albums (VG-lista)	36
Swiss Albums (Schweizer Hitparade)	75
UK Albums (Official Charts)	12

== Certifications ==
Certifications for Souljacker
Region	Certification	Certified units/sales
United Kingdom (BPI)	Silver	60,000^{‡}
^{‡} Sales+streaming figures based on certification alone.
