= Electro-Shock Blues =

Studio album by Eels
- Released: September 21, 1998
- Recorded: October 1997 – July 1998
- Studios: Onehitsville, Conway studios Hollywood
- Genres: Indie rock; art rock; alternative rock
- Length: 48:03
- Label: DreamWorks
- Producers: E; Jim Jacobsen; Mickey Petralia; Michael Simpson

Eels chronology
Beautiful Freak (1996)	Electro-Shock Blues (1998)	Daisies of the Galaxy (2000)

Singles from Electro-Shock Blues
- 1. "Last Stop: This Town" Released: September 14, 1998; 2. "Cancer for the Cure" Released: November 30, 1998; 3. "Climbing to the Moon" Released: 1998 (promo); 4. "3 Speed" Released: 1998 (promo)

Electro-Shock Blues is the second studio album by American rock band Eels. It was released in the United Kingdom on September 21, 1998, and October 20 in the United States by record label DreamWorks. Commercially the album didn't fare well, compared to Beautiful Freak (1996), selling considerably less. Though it reached number 12 in UK, eventually being certified gold, it did not chart in the US.

It was well received by critics with many acknowledging the album's darker tone, compared to its predecessor, dealing with themes of death, loss and tragedy.

== Background and content ==
Electro-Shock Blues was written largely in response to frontman Mark Oliver "E" Everett's sister Elizabeth's suicide and his mother's terminal lung cancer. The title refers to the electroconvulsive therapy received by Elizabeth Everett when she was institutionalized. Many of the songs deal with their decline, his response to loss and coming to terms with suddenly becoming the only living member of his family (his father, Dr. Hugh Everett III, having died of a heart attack in 1982; Everett, then 19 years old, was the first to discover his body).

Though much of the album is, on its surface, bleak, its underlying message is that of coping with tragedy. The record begins with "Elizabeth on the Bathroom Floor", a sparse piece composed of one of Elizabeth Everett's final diary entries. Tom Baker of DIY Magazine described the song as "The most visceral, raw track of a visceral, raw album. " finding its subject matter to be described "in unflinching detail" and feels "E never tries to sugar-coat or shy away from ugly feelings, and it’s reflected in the language: “My name’s Elizabeth / My life is shit and piss.”" He also described the single "Cancer for the Cure" as "Another of Eels’ counter-cultural theme songs a la ‘Novocaine…’" with "creeping, creepy howling voices, grinding industrial noises"

According to the Eels official website, the song "Baby Genius" is about Everett's father, a quantum physicist who authored the Many Worlds Theory, although Jim Lang, who helped with the song, believed it was about Eels former bassist, Tommy Walter.

Later, the album's emotional climax is reached in two tracks: "Climbing to the Moon", which draws upon Everett's experiences visiting his sister at a mental health facility shortly before her death; and "Dead of Winter", a song about his mother's painful radiation treatment and slow death. NME described "The Medication Is Wearing Off" as "painful feelings start returning through an opiated haze of soothing melody."

The album's last song, "P.S. You Rock My World", is a hopeful bookend to "Elizabeth", containing subtly humorous lyrics that describe, among other things, an elderly woman at a gas station honking her car at Everett, incorrectly assuming he is the attendant, and his decision that "maybe it's time to live".

== Recording ==
At the time of the album's recording, the only official Eels members were E himself and drummer Butch Norton, as Tommy Walter had left the band.

Electro-Shock Blues features guest appearances by T-Bone Burnett, Lisa Germano, Grant Lee Phillips and Jon Brion.

== Release ==
Electro-Shock Blues was released September 21, 1998, by record label DreamWorks. In addition to CD and cassette releases, it was also released on vinyl. This version included two 10-inch 33 RPM discs on see-through blue vinyl, limited to a small pressing.

== Critical reception ==
Professional ratings
Review scores
Source	Rating
AllMusic	4.5/5 stars
The Encyclopedia of Popular Music	5/5 stars
Entertainment Weekly	A−
The Guardian	4/5 stars
Los Angeles Times	4/4 stars
NME	7/10
Q	3/5 stars
Rolling Stone	3.5/5 stars
The Rolling Stone Album Guide	3.5/5 stars
Select	4/5
The Village Voice	B

Electro-Shock Blues was well received by critics. Robert Hilburn of the Los Angeles Times called it "a brilliant work that combines often conflicting emotions so skillfully that you are reminded at times of the childhood innocence of Brian Wilson, the wicked satire of Randy Newman and the soul-baring intensity of John Lennon." Marc Weingarten of Entertainment Weekly wrote that while the album "lays bare the horrors of terminal illness in songs that shift from clinical to disconsolate", its "real feat is in making death life-affirming".

Colin Cooper of Stylus Magazine, in a retrospective write-up of Electro-Shock Blues, described it as "an album that reeks of classic on all levels: scene is set, tone established, problem arisen, grappled, fought (nearly lost) and eventually—joyously—overcome." Sputnikmusic reviewer Robin called it "deeper than some ironic indie pop record: it's E's honest smack of tough love, and he is his own recipient."

Robert Christgau gave the album a 'B', finding the album was "devoid of charm" but praised its ambition, though he noted its themes were deeply personal and felt the album needed an electronic press kit to address these themes. Anthony Decurtis of Rolling Stone praised the sound and tone of the album, saying "E presses into the darkness and finds a sound to suit his subject. The stark, introspective guitar-bass-drums arrangements are occasionally relieved by blasts of noise or elegantly colored string, horn and keyboard touches." but noted "Amid the corpses, however, Electro-Shock Blues is suffused with a narcissistic self-loathing that even the world's horrors don't excuse."

Stephen Dalton of NME observed "Here, finally, is a record which does not exploit its author's pain but rather rages, with quiet dignity, against the dying of the light.", "Never before have the words 'funeral' and 'suicide' appeared so abundantly on an album, nor with so much tragic weight.", and also felt the album drew comparison to Manic Street Preachers' album Everything Must Go (1996) and found the first half of the album to resemble Radiohead.

Greg Prato of Allmusic called the album "One of the finest and fully realized records of 1998, a must-hear.", describing it as "a spectacular epic work, easily on par with such classic albums cut from the same cloth -- Neil Young's Tonight's the Night, Lou Reed's Magic and Loss." while comparing some songs to Beck. He also noted the album's darker tone from its predecessor, but found it to be "just as rewarding."

== Tour ==
The Daniel Johnston song "Living Life" was played often on the Electro-Shock Blues tour, eventually seeing a studio release in 2004 on the tribute compilation The Late Great Daniel Johnston: Discovered Covered.

== Track listing ==
All tracks are written by Mark Oliver "E" Everett except where noted.

No.	Title	Writer(s)	Length
1.	"Elizabeth on the Bathroom Floor"		2:08
2.	"Going to Your Funeral Part I"	E; Jim Jacobsen; Parthenon Huxley	2:37
3.	"Cancer for the Cure"	E; Mickey Petralia	4:46
4.	"My Descent into Madness"	E; Prince Paul; Dan Nakamura; Michael Simpson	3:54
5.	"3 Speed"		2:45
6.	"Hospital Food"	Butch; E; Jim Lang	3:23
7.	"Electro-Shock Blues"	E; Petralia	2:29
8.	"Efils' God"	E; Simpson	3:19
9.	"Going to Your Funeral Part II"	E; Jacobsen	1:30
10.	"Last Stop: This Town"	E; Simpson	3:27
11.	"Baby Genius"	E; Lang	2:04
12.	"Climbing to the Moon"		3:38
13.	"Ant Farm"		2:11
14.	"Dead of Winter"		2:59
15.	"The Medication Is Wearing Off"	E; Petralia	3:51
16.	"P.S. You Rock My World"		3:08
Total length:			48:03

== Personnel ==
Eels

- E – vocals, guitar, bass, piano, keyboards, lyrics
- Butch – drums, percussion, backing vocals

Additional musicians

- Jon Brion – Chamberlin and Hammond organ on "Climbing to the Moon"
- T-Bone Burnett – bass on "Climbing to the Moon"
- Lisa Germano – violin on "Ant Farm"
- Parthenon Huxley – guitar on "Going to Your Funeral Part I"
- Jim Jacobsen – bass and keyboards on "Going to Your Funeral Part I", clarinet on "Going to Your Funeral Part II", arrangements
- John Leftwich – upright bass on "Ant Farm" and "Dead of Winter", bowed bass on "Dead of Winter"
- Elton Jones – backing vocals on "Last Stop: This Town"
- Bill Liston – saxophone on "Hospital Food"
- Volker Masthoff – vocals on "My Descent into Madness"
- Cynthia Merrill – backwards cello on "Efils' God"
- Grant-Lee Phillips – electric guitar, banjo, backing vocals on "Climbing to the Moon"
- Stuart Wylen – ½ Rhodes, guitar, alto and bass flutes on "The Medication Is Wearing Off"

Technical

- E – production
- Michael Simpson – production
- Mickey Petralia – production, mixing
- Greg Collins – mixing
- Jim Lang – mixing, conduction
- Stephen Marcussen – mastering
- Chester Brown – sleeve illustration
- Debbie Dreschler – sleeve illustration
- Hugh Everett III – sleeve illustration
- Joe Matt – sleeve illustration
- Francesca Restrepo – art direction, sleeve design
- H. Scott Rusch – illustration
- Seth – sleeve illustration
- Adrian Tomine – sleeve illustration

== Charts ==
Sales chart performance for Electro-Shock Blues
Chart (1998)	Peak position
Belgian Albums (Ultratop Flanders)	4
Belgian Albums (Ultratop Wallonia)	35
Dutch Albums (Album Top 100)	50
French Albums (SNEP)	24
German Albums (Offizielle Top 100)	59
Norwegian Albums (VG-lista)	36
Swedish Albums (Sverigetopplistan)	56
UK Albums (Official Charts)	12

== Certifications and sales ==
Sales certifications for Electro-Shock Blues
Region	Certification	Certified units/sales
United Kingdom (BPI)	Gold	100,000^{*}
United States	—	35,000
^{*} Sales figures based on certification alone.
