= Mark Oliver Everett =

American rock musician (born 1963)

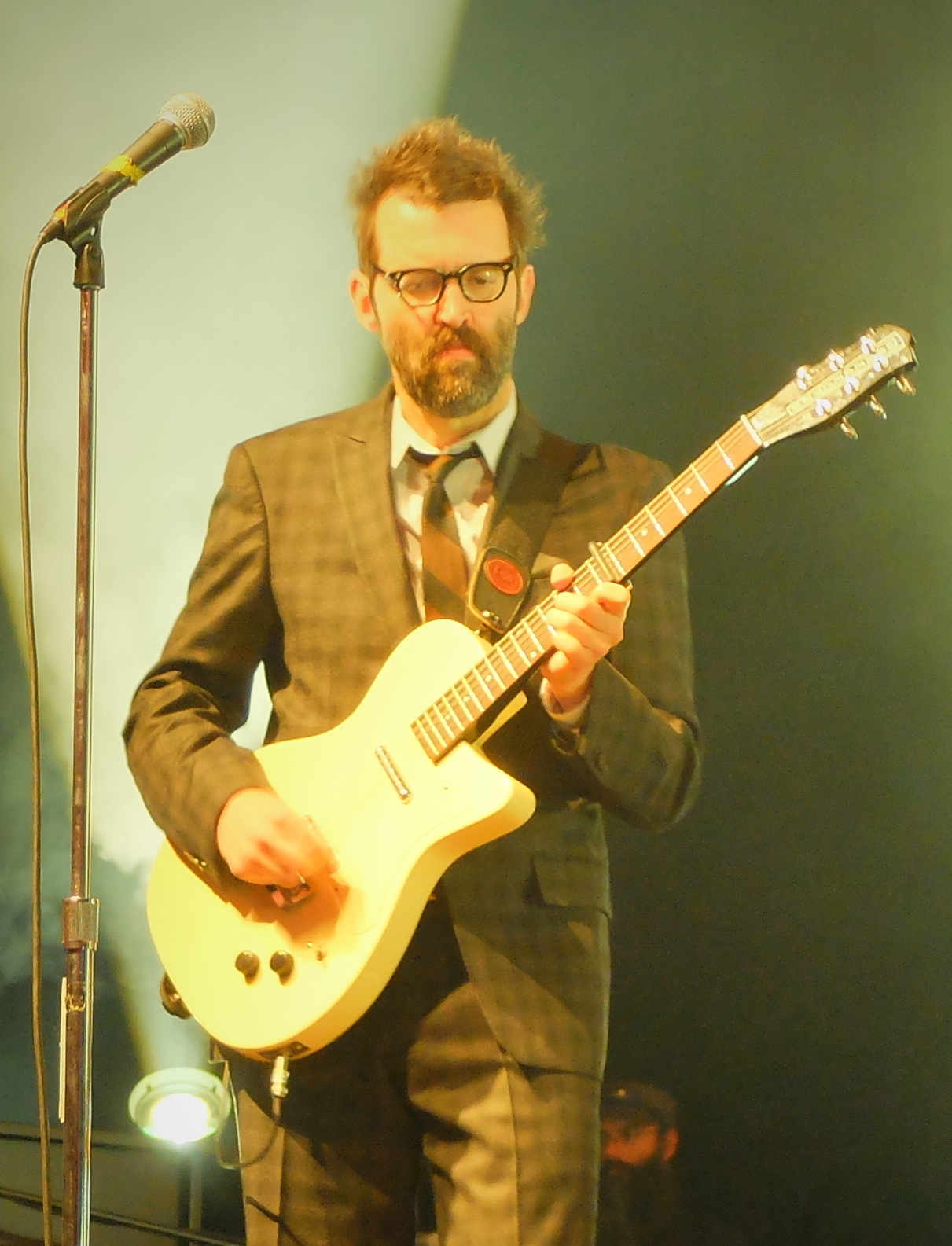
- Everett performing at The Palace of Fine Arts in San Francisco, 2014

Background information
- Also known as: E; MC Honky
- Born: April 10, 1963 (age 63); Virginia, U.S.
- Origin: Los Feliz, California, U.S.
- Genre: Alternative rock
- Occupations: Singer; musician; songwriter; record producer
- Instruments: Vocals; guitar; keyboards; drums
- Years active: 1985–present
- Labels: Polydor; DreamWorks; EWorks; Vagrant
- Member of: Eels
- Website: eelstheband.com

Mark Oliver Everett, also known by his stage name E (born April 10, 1963), is an American singer, songwriter, multi-instrumentalist and the frontman of the rock band Eels. He is known for writing songs tackling subjects such as death, loneliness, divorce, childhood innocence, depression, and unrequited love, often from personal experience.

== Early life ==
Everett is the son of physicist Hugh Everett III, originator of the many-worlds interpretation of quantum mechanics. Mark's maternal grandfather was Harold "Kid" Gore, a men's basketball, football and baseball coach at the University of Massachusetts-Amherst. He is of German, Austrian, Polish, Greek, Spanish, Irish, English, Welsh and Scottish descent.

When Everett was in his early teens, he was attending a concert by English rock band The Who when a special effects laser struck him directly in the eye and, as a result, he has needed to wear glasses ever since.

Everett's father died of a heart attack when Everett was 19. Mark was the one to find him. Everett later made a documentary about his father's theory and his relationship with him, Parallel Worlds, Parallel Lives, for the BBC. It aired on the PBS series NOVA in 2008.

== Career ==
=== E ===
In 1987, Everett moved from his family home in Virginia and settled in California. There, Everett began his professional musical career with two major-label albums: A Man Called E (1992) and Broken Toy Shop (1993). The pseudonym "E" was used for both of these early recordings. He became known as "E" because there were several people in his life at the time who had the same first name.

=== Eels ===
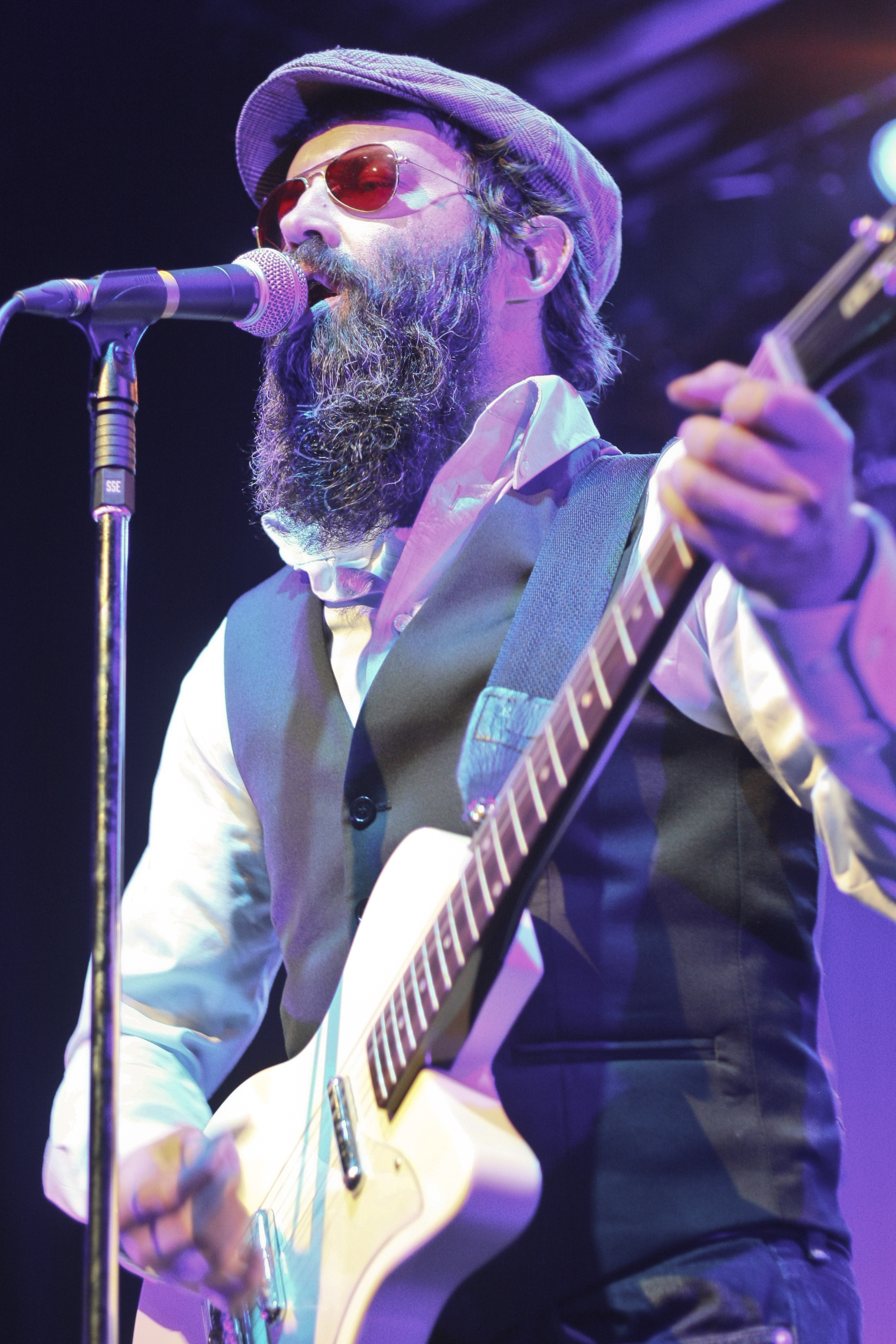
Everett with Eels in 2011

In 1995, Everett formed the band Eels in Los Angeles. Their studio albums include Beautiful Freak (1996), Electro-Shock Blues (1998), Daisies of the Galaxy (2000), Souljacker (2001), Shootenanny! (2003), Blinking Lights and Other Revelations (2005), Hombre Lobo: 12 Songs of Desire (2009), End Times (2010), Tomorrow Morning (2010), Wonderful, Glorious (2013), The Cautionary Tales of Mark Oliver Everett (2014), The Deconstruction (2018), Earth to Dora (2020), Extreme Witchcraft (2022), and Eels Time! (2024). Hombre Lobo, End Times and Tomorrow Morning form a trilogy, focusing on "lust, loss and redemption".

=== In film ===
Everett's music has been featured in a number of films, including American Beauty ("Cancer for the Cure"), Scream 2 ("Your Lucky Day in Hell"), Road Trip ("Mr. E's Beautiful Blues"), Dr. Seuss' How the Grinch Stole Christmas ("Christmas is Going to the Dogs"), Holes ("Eyes Down", "Mighty Fine Blues"), Shrek ("My Beloved Monster"), Shrek 2 ("I Need Some Sleep"), Shrek the Third ("Royal Pain" and "Losing Streak"), Shrek the Halls ("The Stars Shine in the Sky Tonight"), Hellboy II: The Golden Army ("Beautiful Freak"), Henry Poole is Here ("Love of the Loveless"), The Big White (“I Want to Protect You”, "Last Stop: This Town"), Hot Fuzz ("Souljacker Part 1"), The Big Year ("I Like Birds"), as well as most of the music in Yes Man. Additionally, his song "Fresh Blood" (off Hombre Lobo) forms the music played over the credits of HBO's The Jinx.

Everett plays an acoustic version of the Eels song "What I Have to Offer" in a deleted scene from This Is 40 (2012) and follows his performance by telling Rudd's record executive character that the band has decided to sign a contract with a competing label.

== Other works ==
Although he has denied it, Everett is suspected of working under the alias MC Honky, who released the album I Am the Messiah in 2003.

The 2007 BBC Scotland / BBC Four television documentary Parallel Worlds, Parallel Lives followed Everett as he talked to physicists and his father's former colleagues about his father's theory. The documentary won a Royal Television Society award on March 19, 2008. The documentary was shown in lieu of a support act during their UK, US, Irish and Australian tours in the spring of 2008. In the U.S., the PBS program Nova broadcast the documentary in October 2008.

In November 2007, Everett published his autobiography, entitled Things the Grandchildren Should Know.

On February 19, 2016, Everett appeared as Brian in Season 1, Episode 4 ("A Party in the Hills") of Judd Apatow's Love, playing a cover of Paul McCartney's song "Jet". He also briefly appeared in Season 1, Episode 9, Season 2, Episode 2 and Season 3, Episode 6. He had a small cameo in Bill & Ted Face the Music (2020). He has a brief cameo with his dog in the opening sequence of Ant-Man and the Wasp: Quantumania.

In October 2024, Everett guested on New Zealand band Lips' single "The Wolf," performing a monologue portraying a serial killer.

== Personal life ==
Everett's sister, Elizabeth, died by suicide in 1996, and in 1998, his mother, Nancy Everett (née Gore), was diagnosed with terminal lung cancer. The lyrics of Eels' second album, Electro-Shock Blues, focused extensively on these events.

In 2000, Everett married Natalia Kovaleva, a Russian dentist he met near Hamburg, Germany. The marriage ended after five years. Following Eels' tour accompanying their album The Cautionary Tales of Mark Oliver Everett, Everett took a break from music. During this period, he met and married a Scottish woman employed in the film industry. At the age of 54, Everett became a father for the first time when his wife gave birth to their son, Archie McGregor Everett. The couple, however, divorced some time later.

Everett's cousin, Jennifer Lewis (née Gore), was a flight attendant who died on American Airlines Flight 77, the plane that struck the Pentagon during the September 11 attacks in 2001. The plane struck the side of the Pentagon where his father had worked, and Everett remarks in his autobiography that he wonders whether the plane hit his father's old office.

In July 2014, Everett was given the Freedom of the City of London, at a ceremony held prior to his concert at the Barbican Centre.

Although raised as a Roman Catholic, Everett has described himself as an agnostic.
