= Oh What a Beautiful Morning =

Oh, What a Beautiful Morning

Live album by Eels
- Released: December 2000
- Recorded: Multiple locations, 2000
- Genre: Indie rock
- Length: 63:25
- Label: E Works/ARTISTdirect.com
- Producer: E

Eels chronology
Daisies of the Galaxy (2000)	Oh, What a Beautiful Morning (2000)	Souljacker (2001)

Professional ratings
Review scores
Source	Rating
AllMusic	3/5 stars

Oh What a Beautiful Morning is a 2000 live album from Eels. It features highlights from the band's Daisies of the Galaxy tour, as well as several acoustic solo tracks recorded live at several concerts where Eels opened for Fiona Apple.

== Track listing ==
All songs written by E, except where noted:

1. "Feeling Good" (Leslie Bricusse and Anthony Newley) – 2:32
2. "Overture" – 7:02

Composed of:

"Last Stop: This Town" (E and Mike Simpson)
"Beautiful Freak"
"Rags to Rags"
"Your Lucky Day in Hell" (E and Mark Goldenberg)
"My Descent into Madness" (E, Paul Huston, Dan Nakamura, and Simpson)
"Novocaine for the Soul" (E and Goldenberg)
"Flower" (E and Jacobsen)

3. "Oh, What a Beautiful Morning" (Rodgers and Hammerstein) – 6:01
4. "Abortion in the Sky" – 1:29
5. "It's a Motherfucker" – 2:06
6. "Fucker" – 2:18
7. "Ant Farm" – 2:08
8. "Climbing to the Moon" – 4:06
9. "Grace Kelly Blues" – 3:31
10. "Daisies of the Galaxy" – 4:02
11. "Flyswatter" – 8:06
12. "Vice President Fruitley" (Butch, E, and Germano) – 3:13
13. "Hot and Cold" (Butch) – 3:10
14. "Mr. E's Beautiful Blues" (E and Simpson) – 2:23
15. "Not Ready Yet" (Jon Brion and E) – 4:05
16. "Susan's House" (E, Jim Jacobsen, and Jim Weatherly) – 4:28
17. "Something Is Sacred" – 2:37

== Recording ==
- Tracks 1, 4, 5, 9, 10, 14, and 17 were recorded on June 25–26, 2000 in Los Angeles at The Roxy.
- 2, 3, 6, 7, and 13 – July 21, 2000, Glasgow
- 8 – March 24, 2000, Dijon, France
- 11 – July 31 or August 1, 2000, Melbourne, Australia
- 12 – July 11, 2000, Utrecht, Netherlands
- 15 – July 28, 2000, Sydney, Australia
- 16 – May 25, 2000, Paris

== Personnel ==
Eels

- Orest Balaban – Bass guitar
- Butch – Drums, percussion, and vocals on "Hot and Cold"
- Steve Crum – Trumpet
- E – Vocals, guitar, and keyboards
- Lisa Germano – Guitar and backing vocals
- Probyn Gregory – trumpet, trombone, banjo, melodica, guitar
- David Hlebo – Saxophone

Production

- E – Production
- Dan Hersch – Mastering
