= Ken Andrews =

American musician and record producer (born 1967)

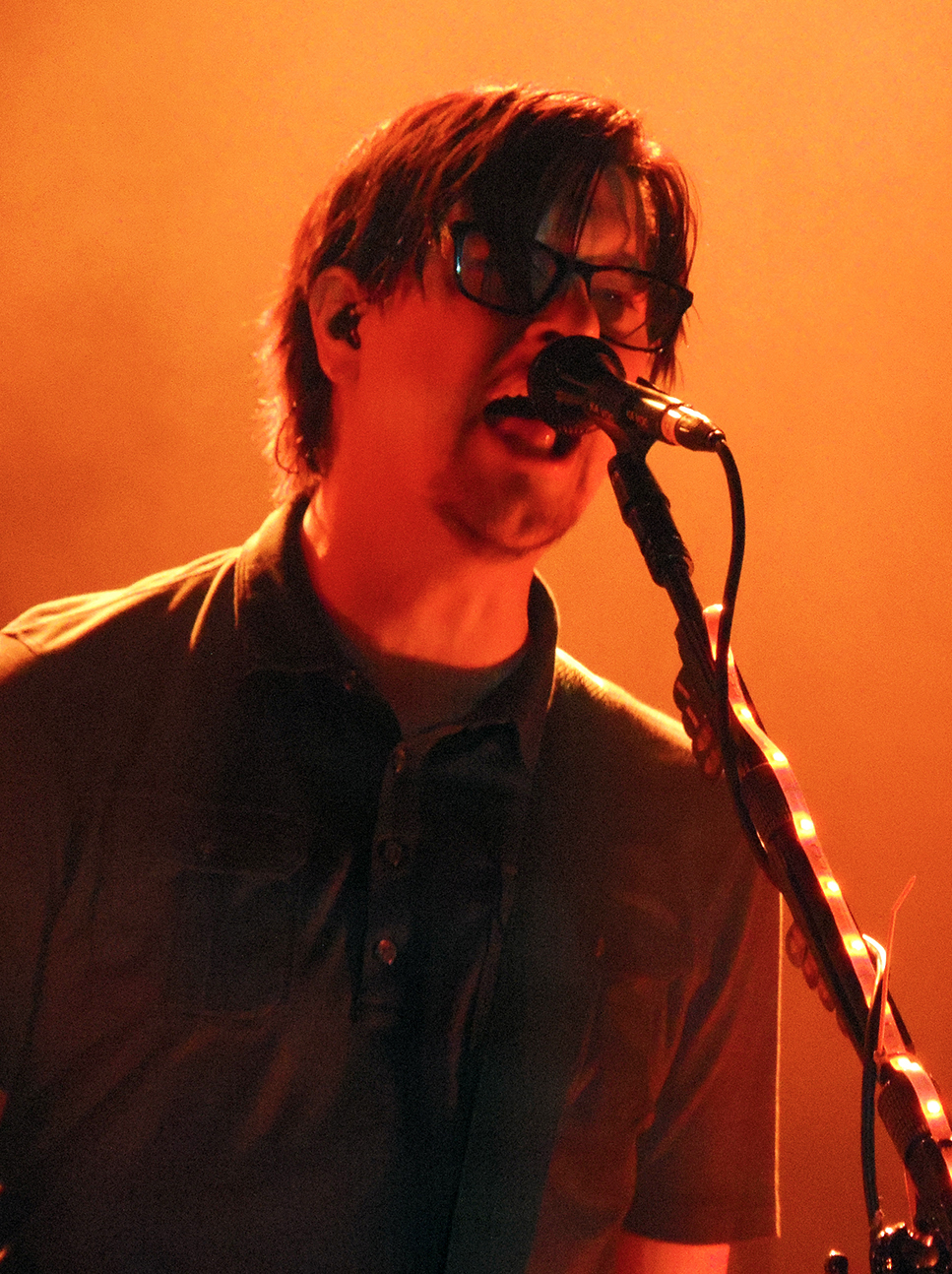
- Andrews performing with Failure in 2014

Background information
- Born: Kenneth Andrew Doty; June 18, 1967 (age 59); Seattle, Washington, U.S.
- Genres: Alternative rock; alternative metal; post-grunge; indie rock; space rock; electronic
- Occupations: Musician; singer; songwriter; record producer; audio engineer
- Instruments: Vocals; guitar; bass; keyboards; programming
- Years active: 1990–present
- Member of: Failure
- Formerly of: Replicants; ON; The Wondergirls; Year of the Rabbit; Digital Noise Academy
- Spouse: Charlotte Martin (m. 2005; div. 2017)
- Website: kenandrews.com

Ken Andrews (born Kenneth Andrew Doty; June 18, 1967) is an American musician, record producer, and songwriter. He was born in Seattle and attended film school in Los Angeles before his band Failure received a record deal from Slash Records.

== Career ==
He is best known as co-founder, lead vocalist, guitarist, bassist and co-songwriter of the alternative rock band Failure. He has also played in Replicants, a cover band side project that also included members of Tool. After the breakup of Failure in 1997, he also recorded music under the moniker ON, and later assembled and fronted the band Year of the Rabbit. He has performed as a solo artist, as well as collaborating in a self-described "digital band" called Digital Noise Academy with Justin Meldal-Johnsen, Sharky Laguana (Creeper Lagoon), Jordon Zadorozny, and Charlotte Martin (whom Andrews married in 2005), among others. In 2014, Andrews reunited with Failure members Greg Edwards and Kellii Scott. They embarked on a North American tour, which included two dates performing alongside A Perfect Circle and Puscifer for the celebration of Maynard James Keenan's 50th birthday.

Apart from his work as a musician, Andrews has also produced and/or mixed material for many artists, such as Nine Inch Nails, Beck, Lostprophets, Pete Yorn, A Perfect Circle, Tenacious D, Black Rebel Motorcycle Club, Candlebox, Mae, and others. Also notable is his participation in the production of "You Know My Name", the theme for the 2006 James Bond movie Casino Royale, performed by Soundgarden/ex-Audioslave frontman Chris Cornell.

In March 2007, Andrews released Secrets of the Lost Satellite, his first solo album under his own name, and helped oversee its release via his own label, Dinosaur Fight Records. The initial inspiration for the album came when he was invited by Beck to contribute to songs that he and his backing band were working on for the Nacho Libre soundtrack, recording sessions which Andrews described as "one of the most exciting of my life". Beck's live musical director, session musician Justin Meldal-Johnsen, was already a friend of Andrews', and shortly afterward, they and other members of Beck's band (including Matt Mahaffey of Self) began working on material that eventually became the album. Andrews also brought in another old friend, Jordon Zadorozny of Blinker the Star, to assist with songwriting and arrangements, and Zadorozny also ended up playing various instruments on some songs, as well. Both Meldal-Johnsen and Zadorozny are listed as co-producers of Secrets of the Lost Satellite. Andrews went on tour that spring for the first time since 2003, with the opening band, San Diego's First Wave Hello, also serving as his backing band.

The members of Failure and Tool have been friends since the early 1990s; the two bands toured together repeatedly, and some members collaborated occasionally. Andrews is often credited for directing the music video for Tool's "Hush", but this is incorrect. He did, however, edit the video for their later single "Prison Sex". Andrews is also mistakenly credited with involvement in the post-grunge arena-rock band Neon Steam Dreams; that Andrews is a different musician by the same name. In May 2014, the Cinquanta concert with Tool, A Perfect Circle and Failure was held as a 50th Birthday Celebration for Maynard James Keenan, who asked for the band to reunite for that concert. Keenan stated, "This was the perfect opportunity to tick off one of my bucket list items in the form of a Failure reunion. What better birthday present could one ever hope for?" Failure, however, performed their first reunion show at the El Rey Theater on February 13, 2014, before the event.

He was featured on an episode of WIRED Science discussing the pros and cons of digital vs. analog recording. Andrews argued that more can be done (with greater ease) with digital while Steve Albini argued that he can accomplish just as much with analog.

On the October 28, 2020, Andrews released a five song EP entitled What's Coming. This was his first release of new solo work since 2007's Secrets of the Lost Satellite. Single track "Sword and Shield" has a music video directed by Andrews, which stars David Dastmalchian. This video is intended as a criticism of U.S. President Donald Trump, opening with a shot of a MAGA drum kit, with Dastmalchian lip syncing to the song dressed as Trump. Andrews himself stated that this was the very first overtly political song he had ever written.

On February 5, 2025, Andrews joined Hayley Williams on stage at "G*VE A F*CK LA", her benefit concert to raise funds for L.A. area victims of wildfires. For his segment of the performance, he performed vocals and acoustic guitar on Failure's "Daylight" and acoustic guitar for a cover of Björk's "All Is Full of Love".

== Discography ==
=== With Failure ===
- Comfort (1992)
- Magnified (1994)
- Fantastic Planet (1996)
- The Heart Is a Monster (2015)
- In the Future Your Body Will Be the Furthest Thing from Your Mind (2018)
- Wild Type Droid (2021)
- Location Lost (2026)

=== With Replicants ===
- Replicants (1995)

=== With ON ===
- Soluble Words – EP (1999)
- Shifting Skin (2000)
- Make Believe (2002)

=== With Year of the Rabbit ===
- Hunted (2003)
- Year of the Rabbit (2003)

=== With Digital Noise Academy ===
- Synemy (2013)

=== Solo ===
- Secrets of the Lost Satellite (2007)
- Secret Things: Remixes from the Lost Satellite – EP (2007)
- Secrets of the Lost Satellite Tour, Spring 2007 – live album (2007)
- What's Coming – EP (2020)

== Works as a producer or mixing engineer ==
- Abandoned Pools – Armed to the Teeth
- Anya Marina – Slow & Steady Seduction: Phase II
- Army of Anyone – Army of Anyone
- A Perfect Circle – The Hollow (Acoustic Live From Philly)
- Beck – Nacho Libre
- Beck – Timebomb
- Beto Cuevas – Miedo escénico
- Black Rebel Motorcycle Club – Take Them On, On Your Own
- Blinker the Star – A Bourgeois Kitten
- Blinker the Star – August Everywhere
- Bowery Beasts – Forthcoming
- Bullets and Octane – In the Mouth of the Young
- Candlebox – Love Stories & Other Musings
- Charlotte Martin – In Parentheses
- Charlotte Martin – On Your Shore
- Charlotte Martin – Stromata
- Charlotte Martin – Reproductions
- Charlotte Martin – Dancing on Needles
- Charlotte Martin – Water Breaks Stone
- Chris Cornell – "You Know My Name"
- Citizen – As You Please
- Copeland – In Motion
- Creeper Lagoon – Take Back the Universe and Give Me Yesterday
- Creeper Lagoon – Watering Ghost Garden
- Crosby Loggins – Seriously
- A Day to Remember – Common Courtesy
- Dukatalon – Involuntary Action
- Empyr – The Peaceful Riot
- Failure – Comfort
- Failure – Magnified
- Failure – Fantastic Planet
- Failure – Enjoy the Silence
- Failure – Golden
- Failure – The Heart Is a Monster
- Gone Is Gone – Echolation
- FM Static – Dear Diary
- Future of Forestry – Twilight
- The Icarus Line – Penance Soiree
- Jamison Parker – Sleepwalker
- Jimmy Eat World – Firestarter
- Jimmy Eat World – Last Christmas
- Jimmy Eat World – Integrity Blues
- Ken Andrews – Secrets of the Lost Satellite
- Ken Andrews – Just Say Yes
- Leaves – Breathe
- Lostprophets – Weapons
- Mae – The Everglow
- Molly McGuire – Lime
- Moon Pigeon – "Letters from Thieves" from self-titled EP
- Nine Inch Nails – 1,000,000 and Echoplex – live
- ON – Shifting Skin
- ON – Make Believe
- Paramore – Paramore
- Pete Yorn – Musicforthemorningafter
- Pete Yorn – "Undercover"
- Pete Yorn – "Go with It'"
- Pete Yorn – "It Never Rains in Southern California"
- Pete Yorn – Day I Forgot
- Replicants – Replicants
- The Republic Tigers – Fight Song
- Ruth – Anorak
- Settle – At Home We Are Tourists
- Skycycle – Breathing Water
- Starflyer 59 – Talking Voice vs. Singing Voice
- Starflyer 59 – My Island
- Stone Temple Pilots – Stone Temple Pilots (2018)
- Tenacious D – Tenacious D
- Tenacious D – The Pick of Destiny
- Thousand Foot Krutch – The Flame in All of Us
- Underoath – Erase Me
- Unwritten Law – Swan
- Year of the Rabbit – Year of the Rabbit
