= Orphan (disambiguation) =

An orphan is one who has lost both parents.

Orphan(s) or The Orphan(s) may also refer to:

== Arts and entertainment ==
=== Film and television ===
- The Orphan (1920 film)
- The Orphan (1960 film), a Hong Kong film starring Bruce Lee
- The Orphan, a 1979 horror film starring Peggy Feury and Joanna Miles
- Orphan (2009 film), a psychological thriller film directed by Jaume Collet-Serra
- Orphan (2016 film), a French film
- Orphan (2025 film), a Hungarian historical drama film
- The Orphan (2018 film), a Brazilian film directed by Carolina Markowicz
- Orphans (1987 film), an American film by Alan J. Pakula, based on the play by Lyle Kessler (see below)
- Orphan: First Kill, a 2022 American psychological horror film, prequel to the 2009 film
- Orphans (1998 film), a Scottish film by Peter Mullan
- "The Orphan" (Alias), a television episode
- Orphan film, a film abandoned by its owner or copyright holder, or any film that has suffered neglect

=== Literature ===
- The Orphans series, a 1998 novel series attributed to V. C. Andrews, by Andrew Neiderman
- Orphan (DC Comics), a superheroine associated with Batman
- Orphan (Marvel Comics), a character in the X-Statix series
- The Orphan, a 1980 novel by Robert Lester Stallman

=== Music ===
==== Albums ====
- Orphan (Darwin's Waiting Room album), 2001
- Orphan (Empires album) or the title song, 2014
- Orphans: Brawlers, Bawlers & Bastards, by Tom Waits, 2006
- The Orphans, by Kristeen Young, 2006
- Orphans (EP), by Charlotte Martin, 2008

==== Songs ====
- "Orphans" (Beck song), 2008
- "Orphans" (Coldplay song), 2019
- "Orphans", by Impending Doom from There Will Be Violence, 2010
- "Orphans", by the Living Tombstone from Rust, 2025
- "Orphan", by In Hearts Wake from Incarnation, 2024
- "Orphan", by Silent Planet from Everything Was Sound, 2016
- "Orphan", by Slipknot from We Are Not Your Kind, 2019
- "Orphan", by Toto from Toto XIV, 2015
- "Orphan", by Whitechapel from Kin, 2021
- "The Orphan", by Amorphis from Elegy, 1996
- "The Orphan", a composition by Modest Mussorgsky, 1871
- "Orphaned", a 2006 song from No Heroes by Converge

=== Plays ===
- The Orphan (play), a 1680 play by Thomas Otway
- Orphans (Lyle Kessler play), a 1983 play by Lyle Kessler
- Orphans (Dennis Kelly play), a 2009 play by Dennis Kelly

== People ==
- Les Orphan (1923–1995), Welsh footballer
- Victoria Orphan, American geobiologist
- Mikołaj Krzysztof "the Orphan" Radziwiłł (1549–1616), Polish-Lithuanian nobleman, Grand Marshal of Lithuania, voivode and Imperial Prince of the Holy Roman Empire
- ORFN (born Aaron Curry; 1974-2016), American artist

== Other uses ==
- Orphan (car), any marque of motor vehicle built by a manufacturer that has discontinued business entirely
- Orphan Basin, an Atlantic Ocean area off Newfoundland and Labrador, Canada
- Orphan Knoll, an undersea peak, horst and continental fragment in the Atlantic Ocean off Newfoundland
- Orphan (typesetting), the first line of a paragraph appearing at the bottom of a page
- Cambridge Orphans, a minor league baseball team based in Cambridge, Massachusetts, in 1899
- Sirotci or Orphans, a regional faction of Hussites
- The Orphan (painting), an 1834 painting by William Allan

== See also ==
- Orphan disease, a rare disease
- Orphan drug, one developed under the 1983 U.S. Orphan Drug Act for orphan diseases
- Orphan process, a computer process whose parent process has finished
- Orphan receptor, apparent receptor that has a similar structure to other identified receptors but whose endogenous ligand has not yet been identified
- Orphan source, a self-contained radioactive source that is no longer under proper regulatory control
- Orphaned technology, technology that has been abandoned by its original developers
- Orphan works, copyrighted works whose holder is hard to find
