= Secrets of the Lost Satellite =

Studio album by Ken Andrews
- Released: March 13, 2007
- Recorded: 2006
- Genres: Alternative rock, pop rock
- Length: 45:12
- Label: Dinosaur Fight Records
- Producers: Ken Andrews, Justin Meldal-Johnsen

Ken Andrews chronology
Secrets of the Lost Satellite (2007)	Secret Things: Remixes from the Lost Satellite (2007)

Professional ratings
Review scores
Source	Rating
Melodic.net	4.5/5 stars
The Skinny	4/5 stars
Sputnikmusic	4/5 stars

Secrets of the Lost Satellite is the debut solo album by Ken Andrews. The album cover features the Nazca Lines taken by photographs from the Spot satellite in which the album was most likely named after. The tour that followed involved the band First Wave Hello opening for Ken and supporting Ken as his solo band. This was the first time Ken played Failure, ON and Year of the Rabbit songs as well as his new solo songs in the same set (Replicants cover songs were not included).

== Track listing ==
1. "Allergic" – 5:09
2. "Up or Down" – 3:07
3. "In Your Way" – 4:04
4. "Secret Things" – 3:11
5. "Write Your Story" – 4:28
6. "Perfect Days" – 4:43
7. "What Its Like" – 4:42
8. "Does Anybody Know" – 3:52
9. "Tripped Up" – 3:30
10. "The 23rd Boy" – 3:43
11. "Without" – 4:50
12. "China Dream" (iTunes Exclusive)
