= Tommy Walter =

American musician (born 1970)

- Born: Thomas Edward Walter; Thousand Oaks, California, U.S.
- Origin: Los Angeles, California, U.S.
- Occupations: Musician, singer, songwriter, record producer
- Instruments: Vocals, bass, guitar, drums, keyboards, French horn
- Years active: 1995–present
- Labels: DreamWorks, Extasy, Universal, Visionary Music, CreateSpace, I Miss You, Tooth & Nail, Hype Music, Position Music, Boba Fettish, Little Gabriel
- Member of: Abandoned Pools
- Formerly of: Eels, Glacier Hiking, Oliver the Penguin
- Website: abandonedpools.com

Thomas Edward Walter is an American musician, best known for his alternative rock band Abandoned Pools and as the former bassist and one of the founding members of Eels.

== Early life ==
Tommy Walter was raised in Westlake Village and grew up in the Los Angeles area. As a teenager, he studied French horn and jazz bass at Idyllwild Arts Academy and Interlochen Center for the Arts. He continued his French horn studies in college attending University of Southern California, graduating with a degree in music theory and composition. He later attended University of the Pacific as a graduate student where he additionally taught music theory.

== Career ==
=== Eels and early solo projects (1995–2000) ===
In 1995, Walter formed the indie rock band Eels with Mark Oliver Everett and Butch Norton. Their debut album, Beautiful Freak, was released in 1996 on DreamWorks. After a year of touring, Walter left the band. Walter cited his dissatisfaction with Everett's personality, differences in creative direction, and dissatisfaction with his role as the band's bass player as his reasons for leaving. He has repeatedly referred to Eels as a "stepping stone" opportunity in his career.

After departing from Eels, Walter formed a band called Metromax. Metromax shortly changed their name to Tely and, in 1999, released an eponymous demo album on CD and digital streaming. Tely later changed their name to Abandoned Pools.

=== Humanistic (2001–2004) ===
Walter, using new material, as well as several songs he had worked on beforehand in Tely, composed, recorded, and released his solo album, Humanistic, in 2001 on Extasy Records. While being the creative force behind the project, other musicians contributed to the project, such as Angie Hart of Frente!, who sang backing vocals to "Start Over," "Ruin Your Life," "Sunny Day," and "Seed."

Although a solo project, he recruited a touring band, featuring Leah Randi and Bryan Head filling out the ranks of bassist and drummer, respectively. They had several successful tours, going across the country and headlining with acts such as Garbage, A Perfect Circle and Lenny Kravitz. They also appeared on The Late Late Show with Craig Kilborn and two videos, "Mercy Kiss", and "The Remedy", were released. Monster, another video, was composed of shots taken while on touring, but wasn't released for years, via MTV's website.

In 2002 they performed the theme song for the short-lived Teletoon (also broadcast on MTV) animated series Clone High, called the Clone High theme song. Many of their songs can be heard in the background during the show. Walter also voiced himself in a brief appearance in the final episode, "Changes: You Got A Prom Wit Dat?". After Clone High was dropped by MTV, however, the band stopped its touring.

=== Armed to the Teeth (2005–2007) ===
While keeping in touch with his fanbase and caring for his sick cat, Iggy, Walter began working on material over the next few years, preparing to release another album. After a relationship of his came to a rough conclusion, he was picked up by Universal, and wrote several new songs for his next album, citing his personal life, as well as politics, as his main inspirations.

Teaming up with Bryan Head once more and bringing in guitarist Sean Woolstenhulme, Walter started work in 2004 to record his next album. In June 2005 they released an EP, consisting of a few songs from the new album along with b-sides and demos, called The Reverb EP. This was followed by the full album, Armed to the Teeth, in September 2005

In January 2006, Walter wrote in his online journal that Universal Records had stopped promoting the album. He subsequently quit the label, also noting that Abandoned Pools is once again a one-man project. He has since created two side projects—Glacier Hiking, an alternative rock band, and Oliver the Penguin, an electronica project.

=== Sublime Currency (2011–2012) ===
On May 3, 2011, Abandoned Pools released the song "In Silence", available in all digital stores, as the first single from the upcoming album Sublime Currency. On June 7, 2011, the second single, "Marigolds" was released in all digital stores.

On January 30, 2012, Abandoned Pools revealed that they had signed onto a new record label, Tooth & Nail Records, and that Sublime Currency would be released under this label. They also mentioned that the release date of the third album will be revealed "soon".

It was revealed on May 17, 2012, that Sublime Currency would feature 11 tracks. On July 10, 2012, it was revealed that Sublime Currency would be released on August 28, 2012, and the final artwork for the album was shown.

On July 26, 2012, the album's title track premiered on Alternative Press' website. On August 14, 2012, the track was officially released as the album's third single. The next day, the track "Unrehearsed" was made free to download on RCRD LBL's website. On August 22, 2012, the track "Behemoth" premiered on CMJ's website.

Sublime Currency was released on August 28, 2012, and a music video for the single "Sublime Currency" was released on September 7.

=== Somnambulist (2013) ===
On June 6, 2013, the Abandoned Pools Twitter account announced that the band's next LP, entitled Somnambulist, will be released on July 2, 2013. Shortly after, it was announced that album will be delayed by a week, and will instead be released on July 9, 2013.

On November 26, 2013, Abandoned Pools released a cover of the Christmas song "The First Noel" through the album Hype Music Presents Holidays, Vol. 1.

=== Instrumental solo album and The Haunted House (2020-2024) ===
On July 29, 2020, Walter released the instrumental album Supraliminal on the Position Music label.

On April 6, 2021, Walter released a Kickstarter campaign for making a potential 5th album, 8 years after his last album, Somnambulist, due to articles revealing that a revival of MTV's Clone High was in development, is going to be released on HBO Max. The Kickstarter included a video which contained audio demos of the songs that would be recorded for said album.

The campaign was a success getting a total of $43,782 from 486 backers.

Then, a month later he would go on to transfer the campaign to Indiegogo. The success continued and the campaign managed to get to a total of $44,606 from 498 backers.

On December 4, 2023, Walter announced on Instagram that Abandoned Pools' fifth studio album would be released January 16, 2024. The release of the album, The Haunted House, was pushed back from that date and ultimately released on January 25, 2024 for Kickstarter and Indiegogo supporters. On February 1, Walter announced that the first single from the album, "Aliens", would be released on March 1, with the album itself released on March 29 for the general public.

=== Sixth Abandoned Pools album (2024-present) ===
On August 2, 2024, Walter announced through social media that a new Kickstarter campaign would begin on August 6 to fund the recording for Abandoned Pools' sixth studio album. The singles "Einstein's Space and Van Gogh's Sky" and "My Unicorn" were released on May 29th, 2026 and July 24th, 2026 respectively.

== Discography ==
=== Eels ===
Album information
Beautiful Freak
- Released: August 13, 1996
- Label: DreamWorks Records
- Singles: "Novocaine for the Soul", "Susan's House", "Rags to Rags", "Your Lucky Day in Hell", "Beautiful Freak"

=== Abandoned Pools ===
Full-length

Album information
Humanistic
- Released: September 25, 2001 (US)
- Label: Extasy Records/Warner Bros. Records
- Singles: "The Remedy", "Mercy Kiss"
Armed to the Teeth
- Released: September 27, 2005 (US)
- Label: Universal Records
- Singles: "Armed to the Teeth"
Sublime Currency
- Released: August 28, 2012 (US)
- Label: Tooth & Nail Records
- Singles: "In Silence", "Marigolds", "Sublime Currency"
Somnambulist
- Released: July 9, 2013 (US)
- Label: Hype Music
- Singles: "Red Flag"
The Haunted House
- Released: March 29, 2024 (US)
- Label: Boba Fettish Music/Little Gabriel Publishing
- Singles: "Aliens"

EPs

Album information
The Reverb EP
- Released: June 7, 2005 (US)
- Label: Universal Records

=== Glacier Hiking ===
Album information
The Color by Number EP
- Released: January 8, 2009 (US)
- Label: CreateSpace

=== Oliver the Penguin ===
Album information
Button Pusher
- Released: August 5, 2009 (US)
- Label: I Miss You Records

=== Solo ===
Album information
Supraliminal
- Released: July 29, 2020
- Label: Position Music

== Music videos ==
=== Abandoned Pools ===
Year	Song	Director
2001	"Mercy Kiss"	Frank Sacramento
2002	"The Remedy"	The Brothers Strause
2002	"Monster"	Corey Campodonico
2005	"Armed to the Teeth"	Deana Concilio-Lenz
2012	"Sublime Currency"	Frank Sacramento
