= Knoll (oceanography) =

Rounded underwater hill

In marine geology, a knoll is defined as a rounded underwater hill, not exceeding 1000 meters in height. Any rounded underwater features exceeding that height are referred to as seamounts. They are believed to cover around 16.3% of the world's seafloor.

== Examples ==
- Orphan Knoll
- Graveyard Seamounts
