= Armed to the Teeth =

Armed to the Teeth may refer to:

- Armed to the Teeth (Abandoned Pools album), 2005
- Armed to the Teeth (Swollen Members album), 2009
