= Seamount microbial communities =

Seamount microbial communities refer to microorganisms living within the surrounding environment of seamounts. Seamounts are often called the hotspot of marine life serving as a barrier that disrupts the current and flow in the ocean, which is referred to as the seamount effect.

Around 25 million seamounts are known to exist, however, the research on microbial communities are focused on volcanically active seamounts. The microbial interactions with marine life, such as sponges and corals, demonstrates the potential importance of microbes in the foundational success of seamount communities.

== Overview of Seamounts and the Significance of Microbial Communities ==
Seamounts are submarine mountains which are widely prevalent across the globe, often with an active hydrothermal system. Seamounts also contribute to the global circulation of oceanic primary productivity as biodiversity hotspots, enhancing biomass and species diversity within and beyond marine ecosystems. Their distinctive topographies alter the regional oceanic circulation, resulting in upwelling that transport nutrient-rich water from deep ocean to the surface. This results in unique habitats that sustain the lives of marine organisms, including a diverse range of microbial communities. These unique features of seamounts overall contribute significantly to biogeochemical cycles, particularly due to the involvement of microbial communities in nutrient recycling. Given that microbes are most abundant in aquatic environments, seamounts serve as an excellent focus for research.

=== Geological Features and Distribution of Seamounts ===
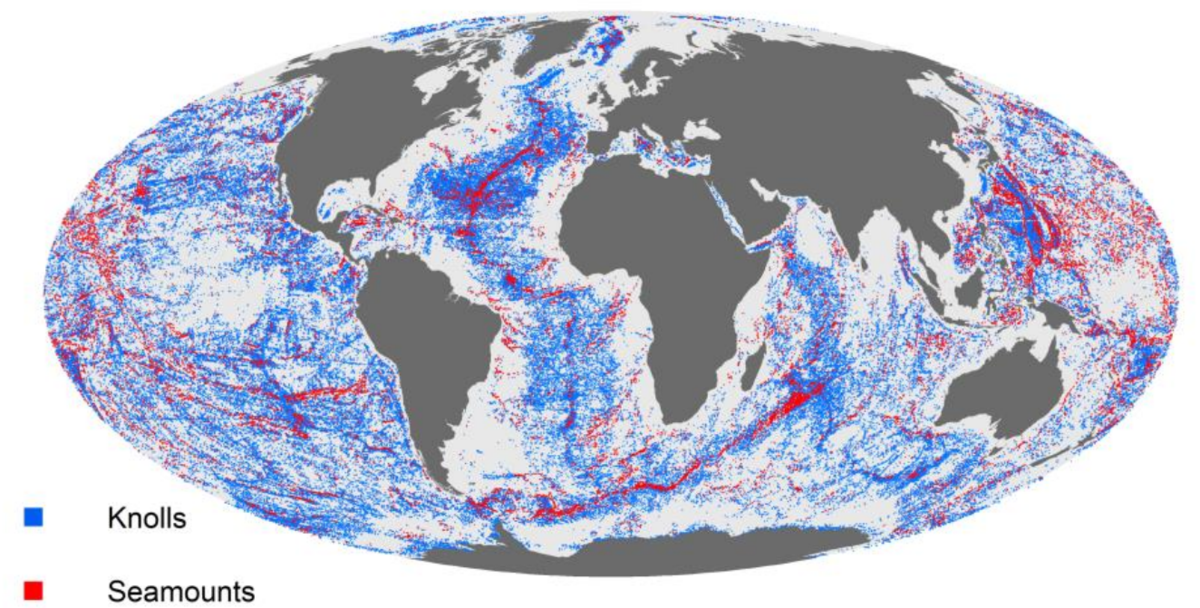
Seamounts and Knolls Distribution Map The global distribution of seamounts and knolls is displayed using bathymetric data with a resolution of 30 arc-seconds. The dataset includes 33,452 seamounts and 138,412 knolls. It shows that seamounts cover almost 5% and knolls make up for 16.3% of the ocean floor.

Seamounts are primarily formed due to underwater volcanic and tectonic activities beneath the ocean floor at the plate boundaries of lithosphere. Additionally, mid-ocean ridges at divergent plate boundaries are common locations for high-temperature hydrothermal venting, which are distinctive habitats, especially to many chemoautotrophic microbes. However, these systems tend to be more uniform in their physical and chemical characteristics compared to vent systems found near volcanic arcs and back-arc regions. Seamounts features a variety of geological characteristics that affect hydrodynamic conditions in a local and regional scale, thus impacting the entire marine ecosystem globally.

The diverse landscapes of seamounts, from cone-shaped to chain-like formations with multiple summits, influence the hydrodynamic patterns which define the distribution and composition of microbial communities within the regions, as observed in the environments of Seine and Sedlo seamounts. Research on various seamounts, such as Kocebu Guyot, the seamounts in the South China Sea, and those like Sedlo and Seine, shows a notable influence on the diversity of habitats and seasonal changes in microbial populations. The variety of microbes found on seamounts is often correlated with levels of Total Organic Carbon (TOC), where higher TOC concentrations are associated with a richer microbial diversity. Specific microbial groups, like Zetaproteobacteria and Epsilonproteobacteria, are predominant in certain seamount areas, their presence shaped by the unique geochemical conditions resulting from the geological activities of the seamounts. This phenomenon, known as the 'seamount effect', alters the patterns of ocean currents, leading to enhanced biodiversity and increased ecological productivity. This makes seamounts critical study areas for understanding the patterns and structures of microbial communities.

== Diversity ==
=== Habitat diversity ===
Diversity and connectivity of bacteria, protists, and fungi was investigated through studies around the Kocebu Guyot in the Magellan Seamount chain in western Pacific Ocean. The studies showed that bacterial communities had higher interlayer connectivity than protists and fungi. Fungi appeared to have the lowest connectivity of the three groups. The seamount notably decreased the protist connectivity in the horizontal scale, while increasing vertical connectivity for both bacteria and protists, creating ecological opportunities for species' diversity. The differences observed between bacteria and protists may be due to bacteria's smaller size and free dispersal. This study in the Magellan Seamount observes an unusual finding regarding protists, where protists show the highest diversity in deeper water layers. Typically, eukaryotic diversity tends to be lower in deep water layers due to food limitation.

Microbial community dominance around the South China Sea (SCS) seamounts was investigated through examining the similarities and differences of seamount and non-seamount sites. Low microbial diversity is associated with low Total Organic Carbon (TOC) concentration in deep waters, while high microbial diversity correlates with high TOC in shallow waters. In both seamount and non-seamount sites, Thaumarchaeota, Proteobacteria, Chloroflexi, Actinobacteriota, Planctomycetota, Bacteroidota, and Acidobacteriota were identified. The dominant microbial communities in SCS seamounts included Nitrosopumilales, Alteromonadales, Anaerolineales, Rhodobacterales, Flavobacteriales, Steroidobacterales, and "Candidatus Actinomarinales." These microbes were not exclusive to SCS seamounts as they were also found in non-seamount sediments. In seamount seafloor ecosystems, Oceanospirillales, Corynebacteriales, Rhodobacterales, S085, and Kordiimonadales are the dominant microbial communities.

In volcanically active seamounts, within the surface hydrothermal vents, Zetaproteobacteria and Epsilonproteobacteria are the dominant microbial communities. Archaea are not abundant in this habitat, except in the Mariana forearc, where they dominate. Epsilonproteobacteria and Zetaproteobacteria are rare in the seawater surrounding seamounts. In general, microbial communities are influenced by the geochemistry shaped by the seamount geological processes.

Seamounts in different habitats and their dominant microbial community
Seamount(s)	Geological Setting	Location	Dominant Microbiology / Predicted Physiology type	References
Lō`ihi	Hotspot	Near Hawai`i, Central North Pacific	Zetaproteobacteria/FeOB (iron-oxidizing bacteria) Epsilonproteobacteria/HSOB (hydrogen oxidizing or sulfur-oxidizing bacteria)	
Axial	Hotspot	Juan de Fuca Ridge, Northeast Pacific	Epsilonproteobacteria/HSOB Zetaproteobacteria/FeOB	
Vailulu'u	Hotspot	Near Samoa, Central South Pacific	Epsilonproteobacteria/HSOB Zetaproteobacteria/FeOB (detected)	
Suiyo	Island Arc	Izu-Bonin Arc, Northwest Pacific	Epsilonproteobacteria/HSOB Gammaproteobacteria/SOB (sulfur oxidizing bacteria)	
Mariana Arc	Island Arc	Mariana Arc, Western Pacific	Zetaproteobacteria/FeOB Epsilonproteobacteria/HSOB	
Tonga Arc	Island Arc	Near Tonga, Southwest Pacific	Zetaproteobacteria/FeOB	
Kermadec Arc	Island Arc	Near New Zealand, Southwest Pacific	Epsilonproteobacteria/HSOB Gammaproteobacteria/SOB Deltaproteobacteria/SRB (sulfur reducing bacteria) Zetaproteobacteria/FeOB (detected)	
South Chamorro and Mariana Forearc	Serpentine Muds (ultramafic)	Near Guam, Mariana Forearc, Western Pacific	Crenarchaeota; Marine Group I & Marine Benthic Group B Euryarchaeota; Methanobacteria & Methanosarcinales/AMO (anaerobic methane oxidation) (implicated)	

=== Seasonal diversity ===
During all seasons, heterotrophic microbial communities dominate for both Seine and Sedlo seamounts. The autotrophic community of both seamounts are primarily composed of small cells. In winter, Prochlorococcus-2 existed on both seamounts.

==== Seine ====
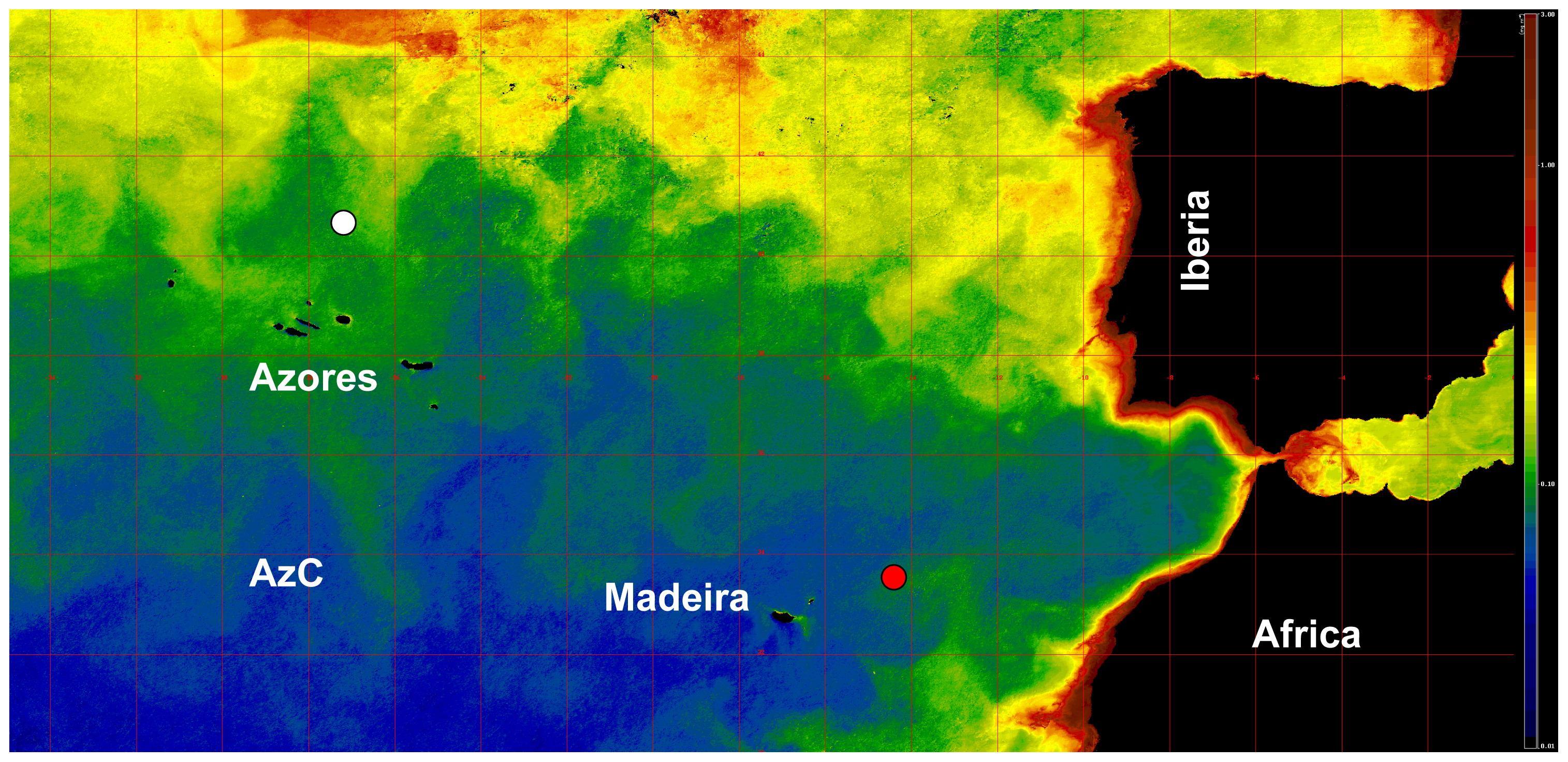
Location of Sedlo (white circle) and Seine (red circle) Seamount

The Seine region is in close proximity to the African coast. This area exhibits regional strong upwelling that provides ideal conditions for larger phytoplanktons. During springtime, the Seine seamount has more contributions from nanoplankton and microphytoplankton, however, less from picoplankton. The integrated abundance of Picoeukaryotes and Synechococcus is highest in spring as well. Comparably, the Prochlorococcus dominates in summer and winter.

==== Sedlo ====
In winter, the Sedlo seamount experiences more contributions from picophytoplankton near the thermocline. During summer, there is a threefold increase in total heterotrophic activity. The integrated abundance of Synechococcus is high in the southern region of Sedlo, suggesting surface water nutrient enrichment.

== Ecological roles of microbial communities ==
=== The Seamount Effect ===
The seamount effect is the principle that the topography of seamounts disrupts the oceanic flow in their area. Due to increased turbulence in the water, this phenomenon results in a greater amount of particulate organic matter (POC) coming down from the surface ocean, which fuels higher biodiversity and production rates than surrounding areas. Seamounts have a higher biodiversity than both coastal and open oceans, but this decreases with distance. Increased production rates lead to increased community growth, especially for unrelated organisms. A large community means that an abundance of niches are occupied, some of which include consuming the waste that is produced when organic matter is consumed.

=== Sediment Communities ===
The microbial communities that thrive within the sediments of seamounts differ from those which occupy the sediments in non-seamount areas throughout the world's oceans. Many sediments have ferromanganese crusts, which include ammonia, that can be used as an electron donor for growth. The sediments at the surface of seamounts house more heterotrophs than autotrophs as a result of the large amounts of POC that become trapped within the sediments following turbulence created by the seamount effect.

=== Trophic Transfer and Consumption ===
The high production levels present in seamounts contribute to a substantial food source for larger organisms, providing sustenance to higher trophic levels. Food sources also come from a disruption in the diel vertical migration (DVM) cycle, as zooplankton which descend back into the deep ocean in at daybreak following their daily cycle can become trapped by high points on the seamount, where they become a prey item for larger consumers. Both pelagic and benthic organisms are found in seamounts as part of their diverse biological communities. When the water flow is changed, it moves microorganisms horizontally between regions of the seamount, further increasing community biodiversity, but also increasing ecological interactions between different trophic levels.

== Interactions with other Marine Life ==
The topographical effects on physical oceanography can boost diversity, enhance biomass, and alter production levels. In biologically abundant seamounts, microbes are no strangers to interacting with other marine life forms.

Sponges and corals are two of many organisms that find water movements in seamounts favorable. As they grow abundant, their encounter with seamount microbes gets more prevalent. Some sponges can be categorized as high-microbial abundance species, harboring up to 100 million microbes g^{−1} of sponge tissue. This relationship provides mutually beneficial interactions, such as those related to metabolism, nutrient availability, and microbe protection. Although coral-microbe interaction studies specifically in seamount environments are limited, corals in other deep sea environments also exhibit such important relationships. These mutually beneficial interactions include those related to nutrient availability, anti-pathogen protection, and microbe protection.

Although other seamount microbe-marine life interactions are currently very limited, the microbial life supports higher levels of biodiversity through sponges and corals. These two are foundational organisms that provide substrate stability, allowing other life forms to exist in that environment. With the right conditions, these can flourish into a web of complex ecology indirectly supported by microbes.
