= Cancer for the Cure =

Single by Eels

from the album Electro-Shock Blues
- B-side: "Everything's Gonna Be Cool This Christmas"; "Exodus Part III"
- Released: November 30, 1998
- Recorded: 1997–1998
- Length: 4:45
- Label: DreamWorks
- Songwriters: E; Mickey P.
- Producers: E; Mickey P.

Eels singles chronology
"Last Stop: This Town" (1998)	"Cancer for the Cure" (1998)	"Mr. E's Beautiful Blues" (2000)

"Cancer for the Cure" is a song by American rock band Eels. It was released on November 30, 1998, as a single from their 1998 album Electro-Shock Blues. It peaked at number 60 in the UK Singles Chart.

== Release ==
The song featured in the soundtrack to the 1999 DreamWorks film American Beauty. Tom Baker of DIY Magazine found its use to be memorable and that it highlighted "the whole “seedy suburbia” angle."

== Reception ==
Tom Baker of DIY Magazine saw the song as another "counter-cultural theme songs, a la ‘Novocaine...’, creeping, creepy howling voices, grinding industrial noises, and singing about “kids diggin’ up a brand new hole / Where to put deadbeat mom,” followed by sinister laughter." describing the song as, "Blacker than black, even when the Monster Mash organs come in for the chorus."

== Track listing ==
CD single

No.	Title	Writer(s)	Length
1.	"Cancer for the Cure"	E; Mickey P.	4:45
2.	"Everything's Gonna Be Cool This Christmas"		2:50
3.	"Exodus Part III" (omitted on vinyl single)		2:32
