= Castor (band) =

- Origin: Champaign, Illinois, U.S.
- Genres: Indie rock
- Years active: 1994 - 1998, 2018
- Past members: Ben Eversmann; Jeff Garber; Derek Niedringhaus; Jason Vance

Castor was an American indie rock/emo band from Champaign-Urbana, Illinois. Formed in 1994, they were known for their "fluid" sound, often changing time signatures several times in a song while maintaining the flow of the music. They released two albums, the first self titled in 1995, the second Tracking Sounds Alone in 1998. Both albums are now out of print and only available in digital format online.

Singer and guitarist Jeff Garber and bassist Derek Niedringhaus were in a small local band together called Flower in the southern Illinois/St. Louis area. They released one E.P. and one full length recording under the band name Flower before disbanding. The two continued working together and recorded an album under the band name "Big Bright Lights" in 1997 which was not released until 2001.

During their existence they toured with other influential Champaign-Urbana acts Braid and Hum amongst others.

Garber went on to play in the bands National Skyline and Year of the Rabbit. Niedringhaus also joined National Skyline, later forming Centaur with Hum singer/guitarist Matt Talbott, the producer of their only single.

On February 24, 2018, Castor reunited for the first time in 20 years, opening for Hum at Delmar Hall in St. Louis, MO.

== Former line-up ==
- Ben Eversmann
- Jeff Garber
- Derek Niedringhaus
- Jason Vance

== Discography ==
Studio albums

- Castor (1995)
- Tracking Sounds Alone (1998)

Singles

- "Carnival/Miss Atlantic" (1997)

Compilations

- "Repousse" and "Silent Type" on the Cover The Earth: A Mud Records Compilation compilation CD (1996, Mud Records)
- "Brand New Room" on The Basement Recordings: Live at Cicero's compilation CD (1997, On The Clock Records) - alternate lyrical version of "The Halo Befriends Me"
