= Graveyard Seamounts =

Series of 28 small underwater volcanoes on the Chatham Rise, east of New Zealand

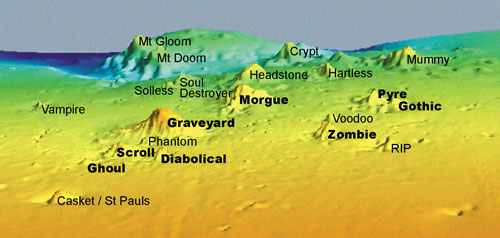
- Graveyard Knolls

- Location within Oceania
- Summit depth: 750 to 1,000 m (2,461 to 3,281 ft)
- Height: 100 to 400 m (328 to 1,312 ft)
- Summit area: 140 km^{2} (54 mi^{2})

Location
- Location: Chatham Rise, east of New Zealand
- Coordinates: 42°45′S 180°0′W
- Country: New Zealand

Geology
- Age of rock: Late Cenozoic

The Graveyard Seamounts, officially known as the Graveyard Knolls, are a series of 28 small seamounts (underwater volcanoes) and edifices located on the Chatham Rise, east of New Zealand. They cover about 140 km^{2} (54 mi^{2}) and stand out from the surrounding oceanic plateau that measures several hundred kilometers. They are named after various morose figures following the naming of the largest of the knolls as "the Graveyard" as it was a graveyard of fishing gear that became stuck on it. The most prominent among the group of knolls are Ghoul, Diabolical, Voodoo, Scroll, Hartless, Pyre, Gothic, Zombie, Mummy, Headstone, Morgue and Graveyard (ordered roughly by increasing size).

== Geography and geology ==
While the official name for these features refers to knolls, researchers in different disciplines see these features in different terms. These features are often referred to as seamounts where a seamount is described as any geographic isolated topographic feature on the seafloor taller than 100 m (328 ft), including ones whose summit regions may temporarily emerge above sea level, but not including features that are located on continental shelves or that are part of other major landmasses.

The seamounts are the site of volcanism from the late Cenozoic era. The knolls are 100 to 400 m (328 to 1,312 ft) high, stand 1,050 to 1,200 m (3,445 to 3,937 ft) deep at their base and 750 to 1,000 m (2,461 to 3,281 ft) at their summit. Many of the seamounts bear marks of tidal scour from water erosion, the result of millions of years of wear by a current moving at 1 to 2 cm (0.4 to 0.8 in) per second.

== Ecology ==
The Graveyard Knolls is a home to over 50 species of fish, dominated by the orange roughy (Hoplostethus atlanticus), black oreo (Allocyttus niger), and cardinalfish (Apogonidae). Orange roughy in particular aggregate on the Graveyard Knolls for spawning and their visits here have supported a commercial fishery since the mid-1990s. A number of the seamounts are also home to extensive deep water coral forests, made up of Solenosmilia variabilis and Madrepora oculata, both species not known to be of wide extent near New Zealand until camera surveys of Graveyard Knolls in 2001 revealed their extent. These forests offer a home to a diverse invertebrate community that includes squat lobsters, seastars, brittle stars, polychaete worms, and crabs. In contrast, the knolls in the group that are affected by bottom trawling are mostly barren, with few coral and a completely different ecosystem.

In 2001, witnessing the damage of bottom trawling to seamount communities, 19 seamounts off the coast of New Zealand were closed off to bottom trawling, three of them from the Graveyard group. Timed surveys of the seamounts over the years are being used to examine how well a seamount coral community recovers from the effects of dredging over time.

== See also ==
- Jasper Seamount
- Mud volcano
- Muirfield Seamount
- Sedlo Seamount
- South Chamorro Seamount
