= Shifting Skin =

Studio album by ON
- Released: June 6, 2000
- Recorded: 1999–2000 at Red Swan Studios, Studio City, Los Angeles
- Genre: Alternative rock, synthpop
- Length: 42:05
- Label: Epic
- Producer: Ken Andrews

ON chronology
Shifting Skin (2000)	Make Believe (2002)

Singles from Album
- 1. "Soluble Words" Released: 1999; 2. "Slingshot" Released: 2000

Professional ratings
Review scores
Source	Rating
AllMusic	3/5 stars
Sputnikmusic	3.5/5 stars
Stylus Magazine	A−

Shifting Skin is the debut album by Ken Andrews' first post-Failure project, ON.

== Track listing ==
All songs written by Ken Andrews; except "Avalanche" written by Andrews and Jeff Trott.

1. "C'mon Collapse" – 3:11
2. "Slingshot" – 2:53
3. "Soluble Words" – 4:35
4. "If I Get to Feel You" – 3:21
5. "Shifting Skin" – 2:59
6. "Perfect Imposter" – 4:21
7. "Avalanche" – 4:38
8. "Feel at Home" – 4:16
9. "Paper Thin Soul" – 3:12
10. "Building..." – 4:43
11. "Pick Up" – 3:56

== Miscellanea ==
- The first single, "Soluble Words," was released several months before the album, in late 1999. A second song, "Slingshot," was serviced to radio around the time of the album's release, but no single was ever released for purchase.
- "Paper Thin Soul" contains drum sounds that were sampled from Electric Light Orchestra's huge 1979 hit "Don't Bring Me Down".
- Album liner notes fielding the assertion of patrilineal kinship with syndicated columnist Dave Berry did not go to final press.
