= Year of the Rabbit (album) =

Studio album by Year of the Rabbit
- Released: July 15, 2003
- Recorded: 2003 at Red Swan Studios
- Genres: Alternative rock, post-grunge
- Length: 42:07
- Label: Elektra
- Producer: Ken Andrews

Year of the Rabbit chronology
Hunted E.P. (2003)	Year of the Rabbit (2003)

Professional ratings
Review scores
Source	Rating
AllMusic	2/5 stars
Alternative Press	5/5
Epinions	4/5 stars

Year of the Rabbit is the only full-length album from Year of the Rabbit, Ken Andrews' second post-Failure project. A tour accompanied the album in the remainder of 2003.

== Track listing ==
All songs composed by Ken Andrews except where noted.

1. "Rabbit Hole" – 2:33
2. "Lie Down" – 4:09
3. "Last Defense" – 3:29
4. "Strange Eyes" – 4:32 (Ken Andrews, Dow, Garber, Snyder)
5. "Absent Stars" – 3:12
6. "Vaporize" – 4:03
7. "Let It Go" – 4:14
8. "Hunted" – 4:36
9. "River" – 3:12
10. "Hold Me Up" – 3:14
11. "Say Goodbye" – 5:00 (Ken Andrews, Garber)
