= Secondhand Dreaming =

Studio album by Ruth
- Released: June 26, 2007
- Genre: Indie rock
- Label: Tooth & Nail
- Producer: Aaron Sprinkle

Ruth chronology
Ruth EP (2006)	Secondhand Dreaming (2007)	Anorak (2008)

Professional ratings
Review scores
Source	Rating
Christian Music Central	link
Christian Music Today	link
Indie Vision Music	link
Jesus Freak Hideout	link
Allmusic	2.5/5 stars

Secondhand Dreaming is the debut album by Christian rock band Ruth. It was released on June 26, 2007, on Tooth & Nail Records and produced by Aaron Sprinkle. "Cross the Line" was the first single and "You Are" was the second single.

A pre-order was available that came autographed and with a free Tooth & Nail sampler that included three tracks from Ruth, The Send and The Glorious Unseen.

== Track listing ==
1. "One Foot In, One Foot Out" – 3:56
2. "Cross the Line" – 3:40
3. "Secondhand Dreaming" – 3:28
4. "Here to New York" – 3:28
5. "Mr. Turner" – 4:09
6. "Work It Out" – 4:13
7. "Standing Still" – 2:52
8. "Figure You Out" – 3:57
9. "You Are" – 3:18
10. "Love Me Like You Do" – 4:09
11. "Always Yours" – 4:09
12. "Well with Soul" – 4:45

== Singles ==
- "Cross the Line"
- "You Are"
- "One Foot In, One Foot Out"
