= South Chamorro Seamount =

Large serpentinite mud volcano and seamount in the Izu–Bonin–Mariana Arc

- Location within Pacific Ocean
- Height: ~2,400 m (7,874 ft)

Location
- Location: 85 km (53 mi) off of the Mariana Trench
- Coordinates: 13°7′N 146°0′E

Geology
- Type: Mud volcano, Seamount
- Volcanic arc/chain: Izu-Bonin-Mariana Volcanic Arc of the Mariana Trench

History
- Discovery date: 1977
- First visit: 1981

South Chamorro Seamount is a large serpentinite mud volcano and seamount located in the Izu–Bonin–Mariana Arc, one of 16 such volcanoes in the arc. These seamounts are at their largest 50 km (31 mi) in diameter and 2.4 km (1.5 mi) in height. Studies of the seamount include dives by the submersible dives (DSV Shinkai, 1993 and 1997), drilling (Ocean Drilling Program, 2001) and (International Ocean Discovery Program, 2016–2017), and ROV dives (2003, 2009).

The seamount and its nearby peers were created by the movement of crushed rock, resulting from plate movement, upwards through fissures in the Mariana Plate. South Chamorro is the farthest of the mud volcanoes from the trench, at a distance of 85 km (53 mi), resulting in high-temperature flows rich in sulfate and methane. The seamount suffered a major flank collapse on its southeastern side, over which the present summit was probably formed. The summit supports an ecosystem of mussels, gastropods, tube worms, and others, suggesting that it is an active seeping region.

== Geology ==
=== Origin and geochemistry ===
South Chamorro Seamount and the other mud volcanoes formed as a result of the subduction of the Pacific Plate below the Mariana Plate; fault lines in the Mariana Plate provide a gateway for churned up rock and fluid from the grinding process up to the ocean surface. Reactions with the overlying mantle produce serpentinite, hydrogen gas, and other alkaline substances.

South Chamorro Seamount was first recognized as a mud volcano in 1977, on the basis of sonar data, and confirmed as such in 1981 by the collection of serpentine and schist. is one of the farthest volcanoes from the trench, 85 km (53 mi) away, where the plate rides approximately 25 km (16 mi) underneath. Because of its distance from the trench, its eruptive fluids are hotter (over 350 °C or 662 °F), less alkalic, and with more calcium. Its flows have a pH of 12.2 (highly basic) and are sulfate and methane rich.

Serpentine mud volcanoes are currently limited to the Izu-Bonin-Mariana arc; however, there is evidence of the geological remnants of similar volcanics globally, throughout Earth's history.

=== Structure ===
Side-scan surveys of South Chamorro Seamount show a major southeastern sector edifice collapse, with debris flows of serpentine material (dredged in 1981 and observed by submersibles in 1995) that blankets the slope of the trench from summit to axis. The true summit of the volcano sits above this collapse; its formation was likely tied to the collapse. Submarine observation of the summit show that the summit knoll is broken up into slabs of serpentine mud, with meter-deep fissures arranged in a crosscutting orientation.

== Ecology ==
South Chamorro Seamount is host to a variety of fauna, including mussels, gastropods, tube worms, and galatheid crabs. A borehole observatory on the summit produced 20,000 litres of microbial-altered fluid per day for study. These organisms are supported by low-temperature springs from the fissures surrounding the summit zone. The mussels are probably of the genus Bathymodiolus, which require a high concentration of methane in their food source. The fluid composition and the biological community suggests that the summit region is an active cold seep region.

== See also ==
- Graveyard Seamounts
- Jasper Seamount
- Mud volcano
- Muirfield Seamount
- Sedlo Seamount
