= Muirfield Reef =

Reef in the Indian Ocean near the Cocos (Keeling) Islands

Coordinates: 13°13′59″S 96°04′21″E

Muirfield Reef, also known as Muirfield Bank, is a small reef located southwest of the Cocos (Keeling) Islands in the Indian Ocean. It is about 77 nautical miles (143 km) from these islands and is part of Australia (the owner of those islands)'s exclusive economic zone.

Latitude -13.23296 Longitude 96.07260

== See also ==
- Muirfield Seamount
