= Charlotte Martin =

American singer-songwriter (born 1976)

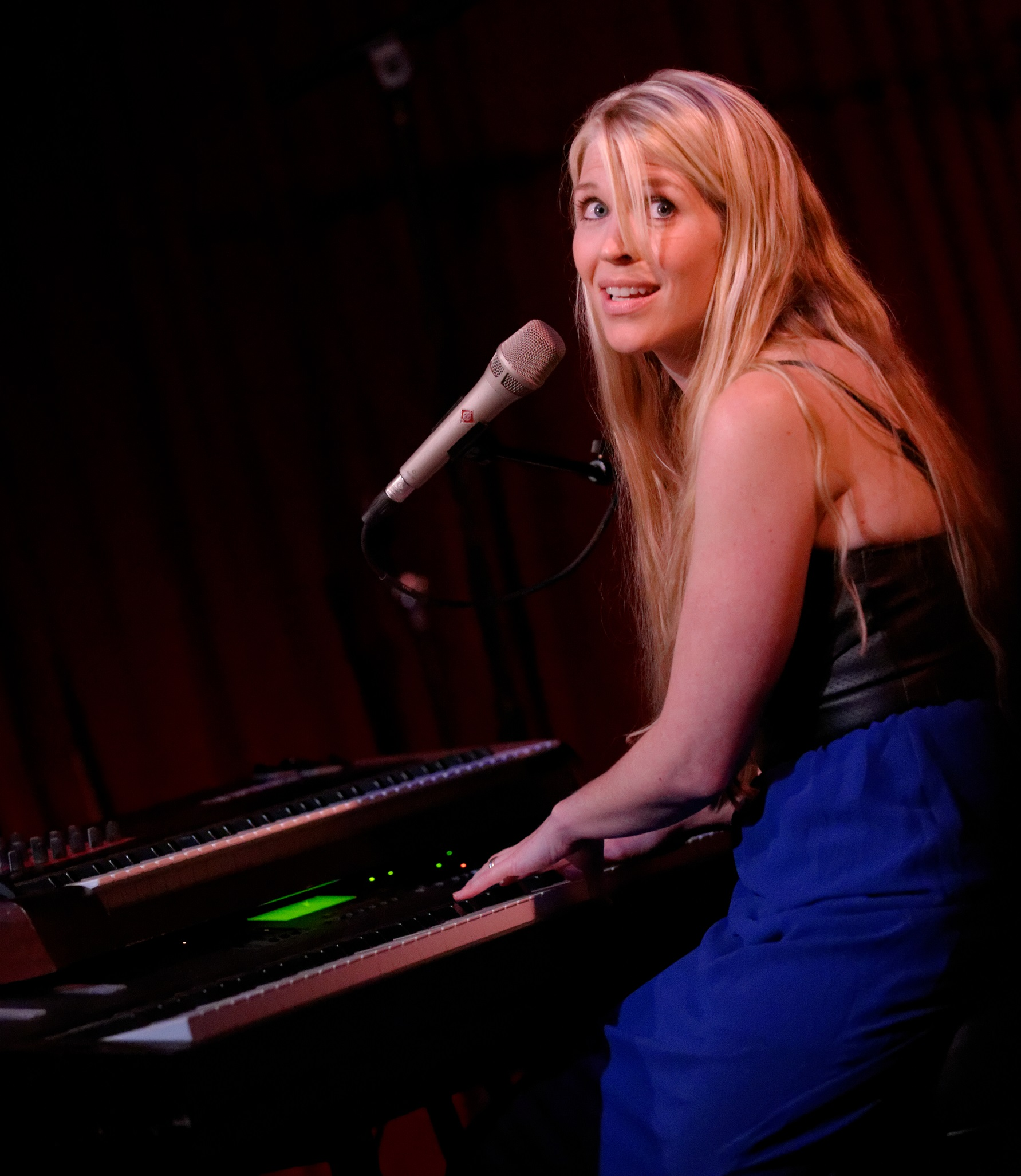
- Martin performing in 2014

Background information
- Born: October 31, 1976 (age 50); Charleston, Illinois, US
- Genres: Alternative rock; pop rock; experimental
- Occupations: Musician; singer-songwriter; record producer
- Instruments: Vocals; piano
- Years active: 1998–present
- Labels: RCA; Dinosaur Fight; Echo Field; Test-Drive
- Spouse: Ken Andrews (m. 2005; div. 2017)
- Website: charlottemartin.com

Charlotte Ann Martin (born October 31, 1976) is an American singer-songwriter and musician who performs predominantly on the piano. She has published several studio albums, two of which have received mainstream commercial releases: 2004's On Your Shore and 2006's Stromata. In 2009, she issued an instrumental piano album titled Piano Trees, which was followed by Dancing on Needles, on February 1, 2011.

== Personal life ==
Martin grew up in Charleston, Illinois. Her father is a music professor at Eastern Illinois University. Martin won the Miss Illinois Teen USA 1994 title on June 26 and went on to compete in the Miss Teen USA pageant in Biloxi, Mississippi, on August 16. She graduated from Eastern Illinois University in 1998 with a bachelor's degree in vocal performance, majoring in opera. In 1999, she moved to Los Angeles. On September 30, 2005, she married musician/producer Ken Andrews. Their first child, a boy, was born on May 4, 2008; their second, a daughter, on March 9, 2011.

Following the birth of her first child, Martin suffered from intercostal neuralgia that left her incapacitated for the better part of a year, causing lengthy delays to the writing and recording process of her album Dancing on Needles.

On August 11, 2017, Martin filed for divorce from Andrews.

== Career ==
=== Early material ===
Prior to the release of her major-label debut, On Your Shore, Martin had composed two full-length albums and two EPs. Her first foray into songwriting came in the form of Mystery, Magic & Seeds (1998), an album Martin wrote as a result of a friend's death, which she now considers juvenilia, but which is available for download from archive.org. Her second album, One Girl Army, remained unreleased, though an EP of the same name containing a few selections from the full-length record was published independently in 2000, and Martin still performs some of its content live. The masters for this album are now owned by Martin's former label, RCA Records.

In 2002, Martin independently released a limited-edition EP containing eight tracks, called Test-Drive Songs, which is now out of print but still available for download on her official website.

In 2003, Martin released another EP, titled In Parentheses, on RCA. It contained four tracks, one of which ("Your Armor") would later be included (with an added string arrangement) on On Your Shore.

=== On Your Shore ===
On August 10, 2004, On Your Shore, Martin's first full-length album on a major label, RCA, was released. A video for the single "Every Time It Rains" was also issued.

To help promote the album, Martin toured on the Chicks with Attitude tour with Liz Phair, the Cardigans, and Katy Rose in 2004.

=== Darkest Hour and Veins ===
While touring, two EPs were released in preparation for Martin's second album, Stromata. The first, Darkest Hour, included a cover of Depeche Mode's "Judas". The second EP, Veins, came out in November 2005.

On May 1, 2006, a DVD of Martin's live recordings, titled Something Like a DVD, was published via Musictoday.

Martin co-wrote and contributed vocals to "Glass Breaker", a song by the Crystal Method, included on the soundtrack to the 2005 romantic drama film London.

=== Stromata, Orphans, and Piano Trees ===
On September 12, 2006, Martin issued Stromata on her husband's label, Dinosaur Fight Records.

Martin co-wrote and contributed vocals to the song "Sweet Things" on Tiësto's 2007 album, Elements of Life. She also co-wrote and contributed vocals and piano to the song "Is This How Love's Supposed to Feel" on Ben Lee's 2007 album, Ripe. She co-wrote and contributed vocals to the song "Feed the Monster" by BT. The original song was never released, but a remix by Blue Stahli was.

On November 11, 2008, Martin released the EP Orphans and followed it a year later with the instrumental album Piano Trees.

=== Dancing on Needles ===
On February 1, 2011, Martin issued her fourth full-length album, Dancing on Needles. Produced by her husband, Ken Andrews (who had previously worked with Pete Yorn and Beck), the record traces Martin's struggle with intercostal neuralgia, a nerve disorder that had left her incapacitated for much of the previous year. "It was the most difficult period of my life", Martin stated. "The pain was excruciating. I saw countless doctors, was misdiagnosed countless times and prescribed countless medications. Nothing seemed to help. Forget about not being able to work; getting out of bed was a major undertaking. Worst of all, I couldn't nurse, or even lift, my baby. As a new mother, that was devastating".

The album was released on Martin's Test-Drive Records and was preceded by the single "Volcano".

=== Water Breaks Stone, Rapture ===
On February 25, 2014, Martin published Water Breaks Stone.

On March 27, 2017, she announced that she would no longer be touring: "At this point in my life, it's not possible for me to mount any long tours or even short ones. I've chosen to be a mommy and that's my first priority. I still plan to be involved in music though and will do one-offs here and there if the timing's right... [T]his is right for me and my family." She held a farewell tour between March and May and released Rapture on May 12, 2017.

=== Clear Blue Sky, Monotonous Night, and Dawn ===
On October 5, 2018, Martin released the second of her instrumental piano albums, titled Clear Blue Sky. The following year, two more albums in a similar vein were issued: Monotonous Night on March 8 and Dawn on December 27. Her latest release is the 2023 EP Knives & Bouquets.

== Discography ==
Studio albums

- Mystery, Magic & Seeds (1998)
- Solo (2000)
- On Your Shore (2004)
- Stromata (2006)
- Reproductions (2007)
- Piano Trees (2009)
- Dancing on Needles (2011)
- Hiding Places (2012)
- Water Breaks Stone (2014)
- Rapture (2017)
- Clear Blue Sky (2018)
- Monotonous Night (2019)
- Dawn (2019)

EPs

- One Girl Army (2002)
- Test-Drive Songs (2002)
- In Parentheses (2003)
- Darkest Hour (2005)
- Veins (2005)
- Stromata (EP version) (2006)
- Rarities #1-#6 (2006–2009)
- Orphans (2008)
- Knives & Bouquets (2023)

Singles

Year	Song
2003	"Your Armor"
2004	"Every Time It Rains"
2006	"Stromata"
2007	"Keep Me in Your Pocket"
2007	"Christmas Is Near"
2007	"Sweet Things"
2011	"Volcano"
2017	"Rapture"

DVDs

- Something Like a DVD (2005, re-released in 2007 as dual DVD/CD set with B-sides from On Your Shore and Stromata.)
- "Hiding Places" (2012 dual DVD/CD: live show and documentary plus 8 B-sides)

=== Additional credits ===
- Martin's song "Beautiful Life" from On Your Shore appears in the Maxis computer game The Sims 2: University (The Sims 2 expansion pack), translated into the game's fictional language of Simlish. "Keep Me in Your Pocket", from Stromata, appears in the same fashion in The Sims 2: Bon Voyage.
- Martin co-wrote and recorded "Glass Breaker" with the Crystal Method. The song appears on the London Movie Soundtrack.
- Martin has released six "rarity" EPs, called the Rarities series, available for purchase only at live shows. These contain previously unreleased or hard-to-find material.
- Martin's voice is featured on the Mae album The Everglow, on the tracks "Prologue" and "Epilogue".
- Martin is the vocalist/pianist and a co-writer in the song "Greater Lights" on the soundtrack of the video game Advent Rising.
- Martin recorded "Bring On the Day" for the film Sweet Home Alabama.
- Martin is credited with additional vocals on the song "Inhuman" by Thousand Foot Krutch, from their 2007 album, The Flame in All of Us.
- Martin's songs "Veins" (from the Veins EP), "The Dance" (from Stromata), and "Wild Horses" (from On Your Shore) were used during the third, fourth, and ninth seasons, respectively, of the television show So You Think You Can Dance.
- Martin co-wrote and played piano on the song "Is This How Love's Supposed to Feel" on the 2007 Ben Lee album Ripe.
- Martin co-wrote and sang "Sweet Things" on the 2007 Tiësto album Elements of Life.
