= Mr. E's Beautiful Blues =

2000 single by Eels

Single by Eels

from the album Daisies of the Galaxy
- Released: February 8, 2000
- Length: 3:58 (album version); 3:26 (radio edit)
- Label: DreamWorks
- Songwriter: Mark Oliver Everett
- Producers: E; Michael Simpson

Eels singles chronology
"Cancer for the Cure" (1998)	"Mr. E's Beautiful Blues" (2000)	"Flyswatter" (2000)

"Mr. E's Beautiful Blues" is a song by the American rock band Eels, released on February 8, 2000, as the first single from their third album, Daisies of the Galaxy (2000). The single reached No. 11 on the UK Singles Chart and entered the top 50 in Ireland and New Zealand.

== Background and production ==
It was produced and co-written by Michael Simpson of the Dust Brothers. Mark Oliver Everett wrote the song after finishing writing the album, and the record company insisted he put it on the album as well. He was against this idea, considering it a disruption of the album's flow, but made the compromise by putting it in as a bonus track.

== Legacy ==
The song features prominently in the 2000 film Road Trip, and is used in part in the 2008 film Charlie Bartlett. In his autobiography, Everett states that letting the song be used for Road Trip is one of the few real regrets he has ever had. He only agreed to it because the record company threatened to not release the album if he did not go along with doing the music video, and at this point the album had been on hold for over 7 months. He hated shooting the video, and as of 2008, he had never actually seen the movie.

== Track listings ==
CD 1

1. "Mr. E's Beautiful Blues" – 3:58
2. "Birdgirl on a Cell Phone" – 3:05
3. "Last Stop: This Town" (video)

CD 2

1. "Mr. E's Beautiful Blues" – 3:58
2. "Hospital Food" (Live from the BBC) – 3:24
3. "Cancer for the Cure" (video)

7-inch single

A. "Mr. E's Beautiful Blues" – 3:58
B. "Birdgirl on a Cell Phone" – 3:05

== Charts ==
Chart (2000)	Peak position
Europe (Eurochart Hot 100)	45
Ireland (IRMA)	46
Netherlands (Single Top 100)	85
New Zealand (Recorded Music NZ)	43
Scottish Singles Sales (Official Charts)	13
UK Singles (Official Charts)	11

== Release history ==
Region	Date	Format	Label	Ref.
United States	February 8, 2000	Alternative radio	DreamWorks	
