= Orphans (EP) =

EP by Charlotte Martin
- Released: November 11, 2008
- Label: Test-Drive Records
- Producers: Charlotte Martin, Ken Andrews

Charlotte Martin chronology
Reproductions (2007)	Orphans (2008)	TBA (2009)

Orphans is an extended play by Charlotte Martin released in 2008. It is composed of b-sides and other songs written for her previous releases, but were left off the final cuts (hence the EP name Orphans). Some did not fit the "feeling" of the previous albums, others were popular live songs never recorded until this EP.

== Track listing ==
All songs written by Charlotte Martin.

1. Is This Called Desire
2. Galaxies
3. Habit (LP version)
4. Outerspace
5. Snowflakes
6. The Stalker Song
7. Raven (Lost Master)
8. Many Rivers (2005)
