= On (band) =

On, stylized as ON, was a solo project of American musician Ken Andrews, which he started after the breakup of his previous band Failure in 1997. The music of On was not unlike that of Failure in terms of songwriting, but the overall sound was more based on electronics, with less emphasis on guitars and the typical heavy rock sound.

On was signed to Epic Records in 1999, and the first single, "Soluble Words", was released late that year. The EP contains four versions of the song, including a remix by Martin Gore of Depeche Mode, and an exclusive track called "Your Sister Says John" (written by Andrews' friend Jordon Zadorozny of Blinker the Star).

After several months, On's album Shifting Skin was released in June 2000. The album peaked at No. 16 on the CMJ Top 200, in March 2000. Andrews then assembled a backing band, which consisted of drummer Tim Dow (ex-Shiner/Season to Risk), bassist Tommy Walter (Abandoned Pools), guitarist Joey Sykes and keyboardist Kevin Moore, and took the band on tour. Another single, "Slingshot", was released to radio, bubbling just under the Alternative Top 50; but the album didn't sell well, and Epic eventually released Andrews from his contract.

A second On album, Make Believe, was released in 2002 via CD Baby and the iTunes Store. Also in 2002, Andrews and Dow formed a new group called Year of the Rabbit. Currently, Andrews is working as a solo artist, a member of Failure and a member of Digital Noise Academy, as well as a producer and session musician.

== Discography ==
=== Albums ===
- Shifting Skin - Epic Records EK 69672 (June 6, 2000)
- Make Believe - self-released (December 6, 2002)

=== EPs/singles ===
- "Soluble Words" - Epic Records ESK 47433 (1999)
- "Slingshot" - Epic Records ESK 49249 (2000)
