= Muirfield Seamount =

Submarine mountain near Cocos (Keeling) Islands, Indian Ocean

- Summit depth: 16–18 m (52–59 ft)
- Height: ~5,000 m (16,404 ft)

Location
- Location: Indian Ocean
- Coordinates: 13°13′30″S 96°7′30″E
- Country: Australia (EEZ)

History
- Discovery date: 1973

The Muirfield Seamount is a submarine mountain located in the Indian Ocean approximately 130 kilometres (70 nautical miles) southwest of the Cocos (Keeling) Islands, within Australia's exclusive economic zone. It is a submerged archipelago, approximately 2.5 kilometres (1.6 miles) in diameter and 16–18 metres (52–59 feet) below the surface of the sea. A prominent maritime navigational hazard, the seamount's existence was unknown until it was struck by a cargo vessel in 1973.

== History ==
The Muirfield Seamount was discovered accidentally in 1973. Its namesake, the cargo ship MV Muirfield (a merchant vessel named after Muirfield, Scotland) was underway in waters charted at a depth of greater than 5,000 metres (16,000 ft), when she suddenly struck an unknown object, resulting in extensive damage to her keel. The location was subsequently surveyed in 1983 by HMAS Moresby; the summit, with a least depth of 18 metres (59 ft), was found to be approximately 5 cables in extent rising sharply from the ocean floor. Muirfield Seamount was granted its official name in 1987 per a decision from GEBCO.

In 1999, RV Franklin surveyed the area on behalf of CSIRO while cruising from Singapore to the Cocos (Keeling) Islands and thence to Darwin, Australia. The ship made a bathymetric map of the seamount and took benthic samples but lost its deep towed video system and wire array due to an equipment malfunction.

A Laser Airborne Depth Sounder Flight RAN mission in 2012 precisely located the seamount's summit. In October 2022, an expedition from CSIRO again surveyed the seamount, this time via the RV Investigator.

== Ecology ==
The 2022 CSIRO expedition determined that the summit of Muirfield Seamount is a drowned micro-atoll with sparse coral cover. Due to its relatively shallow depth, sea cucumbers from the order Dendrochirotida were not observed on Muirfield Seamount. The 2022 expedition documented a greeneye from genus Chlorophthalmus that was confirmed via DNA evidence to belong to a previously undiscovered species.

Since 2022, the Muirfield Seamount and its habitat has been under the protection of Cocos (Keeling) Marine Park.

== See also ==
- 2005 USS San Francisco (SSN-711) seamount collision
- 2008 HMS Superb (S109) underwater pinnacle collision
- 2021 USS Connecticut (SSN-22) seamount collision
- Graveyard Seamounts
- Jasper Seamount
- Muirfield Reef
- Mud volcano
- Sedlo Seamount
- South Chamorro Seamount
