= On Your Shore =

Studio album by Charlotte Martin
- Released: August 10, 2004
- Genre: Pop rock
- Length: 56:32
- Label: RCA
- Producer: Charlotte Martin, Ken Andrews

Charlotte Martin chronology
On Your Shore (2004)	Stromata (2006)

Professional ratings
Review scores
Source	Rating
AllMusic	4/5 stars

On Your Shore is Charlotte Martin's first full-length release on a major label.

== Track listing ==
All songs written by Charlotte Martin, except the bonus track, "Wild Horses", by the Rolling Stones. String arrangements by David Campbell.

1. "On Your Shore"
2. "Limits of Our Love"
3. "Your Armor"
4. "Every Time It Rains"
5. "Steel"
6. "Sweet Chariot"
7. "Madman"
8. "Up All Night"
9. "Haunted"
10. "Parade On"
11. "Something Like a Hero"
12. "Beautiful Life"
13. "Wild Horses" (bonus track)
