= Reproductions (album) =

Studio album by Charlotte Martin
- Released: 2007
- Length: 42:28
- Label: Echo Field Recordings
- Producers: Charlotte Martin, Ken Andrews

Charlotte Martin chronology
| Stromata (2006) | Reproductions (2007) |

Reproductions is a studio album of cover songs by Charlotte Martin.

== Track listing ==
1. "Angel" (Massive Attack)
2. "Obstacle 1" (Interpol)
3. "Constant Craving" (k.d. lang)
4. "Elderly Woman Behind the Counter in a Small Town" (Pearl Jam)
5. "Chocolate" (Snow Patrol)
6. "Bizarre Love Triangle" (New Order)
7. "Cherry-Coloured Funk" (Cocteau Twins)
8. "I Am Stretched Out on Your Grave" (Sinéad O'Connor)
9. "Urge for Going" (Joni Mitchell)
10. "Just Like Heaven" (The Cure)
11. "Song to the Siren" (Tim Buckley)

== Digital bonus tracks ==
1. "Cloudbusting" (Kate Bush)
2. "Mission to the Moon" (Terami Hirsch)

== Musictoday-exclusive bonus track ==
1. "I Never Came" (Queens of the Stone Age)
