= I Become Small and Go =

Studio album by Creeper Lagoon
- Released: 1998
- Genre: Alternative pop
- Label: NickelBag

Creeper Lagoon chronology
Creeper Lagoon (1997)	I Become Small and Go (1998)	Wonderful Love (1998)

I Become Small and Go is the debut album by the American band Creeper Lagoon, released in 1998. The band promoted it by touring with Versus and Rocket from the Crypt. The first single was "Wonderful Love". "Empty Ships" appeared on the soundtrack to the film Dead Man on Campus.

== Production ==
Founding members Sharky Laguana and Ian Sefchick, who had played in a high school band in Ohio, recruited a drummer and bass player through a want ad prior to the recording sessions. John King, of the Dust Brothers and Creeper Lagoon's label, NickelBag, remixed "Empty Ships", "Dear Deadly", and "Wonderful Love". In addition to employing sampling, the band used a long list of toy and found instruments.

== Critical reception ==
Professional ratings
Review scores
Source	Rating
Albuquerque Journal	3/4 stars
AllMusic	3/5 stars
Robert Christgau	(dud)
The Independent	3/5 stars
Spin	8/10

Trouser Press dismissed the album as "by-the-numbers contemporary alterna-pop for listeners who’ve never heard any." The Washington Post wrote that "singer-guitarist Ian Sefchick and guitarist-keyboardist Sharky Laguana compose melancholy ballads that suggest such elegantly downbeat rock composers as Mark Eitzel ('Wonderful Love') and John Cale ('Second Chance')." Spin determined that, "aesthetically, they're between indie-jangle and art-pop, floating in space between the Matadorian arch-intelligentsia and the miniaturists of the Elephant 6 collective." The New York Times stated that the band "turns the kind of noise that sounds like it came from inside someone's brain into achingly pretty, unraveling ballads."

Music Week said that "Creeper Lagoon track a thoughtful, textured path through My Bloody Valentine and Spacemen 3 territory." The Boston Globe labeled the album "a pleasant blur of folk-pop melody, noisy guitar workouts, sampled strings, and Bulgarian chants." The Oakland Tribune concluded that, "live, this band motors along nicely on charisma and an edgy attitude, but this record tries too hard to finesse weak material." The Rocket deemed it "basic, ready-for-airplay smooth pop-rock."

AllMusic opined that, "without King's distinctive touch, tracks like 'Tracy' and 'Second Chance' seem stunted and colorless."

== Track listing ==
No.	Title	Length
1.	"Wonderful Love"
2.	"Tracy"
3.	"Empty Ships"
4.	"Dreaming Again"
5.	"Prison Mix"
6.	"Sylvia"
7.	"Dear Deadly"
8.	"Black Hole"
9.	"Drink and Drive"
10.	"Second Chance"
11.	"He Made Us All Blind"
