= Last Stop: This Town =

- Cover by Seth

Single by Eels

from the album Electro-Shock Blues
- Released: 1998
- Recorded: 1998
- Genre: Alternative rock
- Length: 3:27
- Label: DreamWorks
- Songwriter(s): E; Michael Simpson
- Producer(s): E; Michael Simpson

Eels singles chronology
"Your Lucky Day in Hell" (1997)	"Last Stop: This Town" (1998)	"Cancer for the Cure" (1998)

"Last Stop: This Town" is a song by American rock band Eels. It was released as a single from their 1998 album Electro-Shock Blues. It was co-produced and co-written by Eels frontman E with Michael Simpson of the Dust Brothers.

== Content ==
The song is about E's sister Elizabeth, who committed suicide prior to the recording of Electro-Shock Blues.

== Music video ==
E sings along with a carrot clone of himself in the music video for "Last Stop: This Town".

The music video for "Last Stop: This Town," directed by Garth Jennings and produced by his company Hammer & Tongs, features E singing to the audience with various vegetables strewn around him. As the video progresses, a carrot is slowly turned into a clone of E. Interspersed throughout is a performance video of Eels performing the song on a multiple rotating platforms that move up and down. Near the end of the video, the carrot clone is strapped into a toy robot and walks away.

The music video was nominated for "Breakthrough Video" at the 1999 MTV Video Music Awards.

== Release ==
The song was released commercially in Australia and the United Kingdom and as a promo only in the United States. "Last Stop: This Town" reached number 23 in the UK Singles Chart in September 1998 and spent four weeks at number 40 on the Billboard Hot Modern Rock Tracks from November 14–December 26, 1998.

The song and its music video appear on the CD/DVD Meet the Eels: Essential Eels, Vol. 1 (1996–2006). The B-sides would later be collected on B-Sides & Rarities 1996–2003 and Useless Trinkets: B-Sides, Soundtracks, Rarities and Unreleased 1996–2006. Live performances of the song are featured on Oh What a Beautiful Morning, Electro-Shock Blues Show, Sixteen Tons (Ten Songs), and Live and in Person! London 2006. In 2007, a performance for the Bridge School Benefit from October 18, 1998, was released on The Bridge School Collection, Vol. 3, released exclusively through the iTunes Store.

== Track listing ==
Australia and United Kingdom

No.	Title	Writer(s)	Length
1.	"Last Stop: This Town"	E; Michael Simpson	3:27
2.	"Funeral Parlor"	E	2:13
3.	"Novocaine for the Soul" (by The Moog Cookbook)	E; Mark Goldenberg	3:07

United States

All tracks are written by E and Michael Simpson

No.	Title	Length
1.	"Last Stop: This Town" (radio edit)	3:07
2.	"Last Stop: This Town" (radio edit)	3:16
3.	"Last Stop: This Town" (album version)	3:27

== Personnel ==
Eels

- E – vocals, guitar, bass guitar, keyboards, organ, production
- Butch – drums, backing vocals on "Last Stop: This Town"

The Moog Cookbook

- Brian Kehew – synthesizer
- Roger Joseph Manning Jr. – synthesizer

Additional personnel

- Elton Jones – backing vocals on "Last Stop: This Town"
- Stephen Marcussen – mastering
- Michael Simpson – production
