= National Skyline =

American alternative rock band

- Origin: Champaign/Urbana, Illinois, USA
- Genres: Alternative rock, shoegazing, electronic, experimental rock
- Years active: 1996–2001; 2006–present
- Labels: Hidden Agenda/Parasol, File 13
- Members: Jeff Garber
- Past members: Jeff Dimpsey; James Minor; Nick Macri; Derek Niedringhaus; Steve Lamos
- Website: MySpace

National Skyline is an American alternative rock band formed in late 1996 by Jeff Dimpsey of Hum. Dimpsey originally formed the band in order to perform a 45-minute-long song that he had written. They were initially an indie rock supergroup of sorts, with a rotating cast of prominent Champaign/Chicago area musicians. They did record the 45-minute song/album with Rick Valentin (of The Poster Children) in spring 1997, but it has never been released. The band's name is apparently a reference to Bob Dylan's album Nashville Skyline, though their music betrays no stylistic debt to Dylan.

The group's core members Dimpsey (bass) and Jeff Garber (singer/guitarist/songwriter) released two full-lengths, National Skyline and This = Everything, and the EP Exit Now. They also contributed the song "Eurorak" to the Parasol Records compilation Sweet Sixteen, Volume 2.

== Band characteristics/quirks ==
They are known for utilizing an elaborate light show at all of their concerts. No photo of the band members has appeared in any of their albums or EP. Cover art generally consists of things such as empty buildings and blurred car lights at night; the band's artwork is always done by Ohio Girl Design. Rather than listing individual credits as all bands do, the phrase "Audio: National Skyline" is given in the liner notes of each album/EP. They generally use a drum machine instead of live drumming. The song "Karolina" was released on the self-titled album. A different, greatly extended (12+ minute) version called "Karolina II" came out on Exit Now.

== Touring/possible hiatus ==
James Minor of Blacklist and Compound Red joined as a touring guitarist in 2000, joining the band as an official member before the recording of This = Everything; Dimpsey did not participate in the 2000 - 2001 touring. National Skyline has apparently not performed live since 2001. Nothing was heard from the band for five years, leading to speculation of a breakup. In June 2006, Garber leaked information about a new project on the group's MySpace site, without involvement from Dimpsey, including the new track "Pack Up." He also launched the group's homepage—a surrealist series of cryptic images in a Flash animation, ending with a logo and the words "FAUX EVIL." Faux Evil Twin Theory is said to be the title of their upcoming album.

Before joining National Skyline, Garber was the singer for indie rock band Castor. He was also a guitarist in Year of the Rabbit and the lead singer/guitarist of post-punk influenced band The Joy Circuit. (No relation to the '80s group also named The Joy Circuit.)

On September 2, 2007, the band announced that the project was permanently disbanding and some of the material intended for a full-length album would be released as The Last Day, a digital ep available on MySpace September 3 and iTunes Store and Rhapsody on September 18. Garber has moved on to a solo project called The Black Swan.

On November 28, 2007, Garber posted a new blog on the band's MySpace site, informing visitors that 'The Last Day' was posted on iTunes after much delay and that new material was being written for a to-be-released 2008 full-length record.

== Discography ==
- unreleased full-length album (one 45-minute song) (1997)
- National Skyline (2000, Hidden Agenda Records/ Parasol Records) (CD)
- "Eurorak" on the compilation Sweet Sixteen, Vol. 2 (2000, Parasol Records) (CD)
- Exit Now EP (2001, File 13 Records) (CD)
- This = Everything (2001, File 13 Records) (CD/LP) ("A Million Circles" full mp3: http://www.file-13.com/mp3/ft36.mp3)
- The Last Day EP (2007, independent) (digital)
- Bliss & Death (2009, independent) (digital)
- The Bloom EP (2009, independent) (digital)
- Look in My Eyes (2009, independent) (digital)
- The Free EP (2009, independent) (digital)
- Broadcasting, Vol. 1 EP (2011, independent) (digital)
- Broadcasting, Vol. 2 EP (2011, independent) (digital)
- Broadcasting (2011, Hype Music) (digital)
- Bursts (5/31/2011, Hype Music) (digital) (http://hypemusic.com/new-music/national-skyline/)
- Already Gone EP (12/06/2011, Hype Music) (digital)
- Primitive Parade (12/13/2011, Hype Music) (digital)
- Love Letters for the Disenchanted (10/28/2014, Adventure Broadcasting) (digital)
