= Stromata (album) =

Studio album by Charlotte Martin
- Released: September 12, 2006
- Length: 53:54
- Label: Dinosaur Fight
- Producers: Charlotte Martin, Ken Andrews

Charlotte Martin chronology
| On Your Shore (2004) | Stromata (2006) | Reproductions (2007) |

Stromata is Charlotte Martin's follow up to On Your Shore and her second full-length release, on her own label.

The title is derived from "the connective tissue framework of an organ, gland, or other structure, as distinguished from the tissues performing the special function of the organ or part".

Martin stated: "When I finished the actual song, I found the word stromata first of all. I'd been researching intelligent science, space and time travel, the eleven dimensions of God and all this crazy stuff. I'm a very spiritual person and upon my readings I came across the word stromata and I really loved what it represented and what it stood for. It means it's the framework of a cell. There's many definitions. Someone told me that it's a spiritual or religious term. I was looking at it as a scientific term but I used basically a metaphoric explanation as to why everything connects and disconnects and why basically in the last year my life has fallen apart and got put back together. And the words in the song seemed to encapsulate and sum up everything that I was feeling and what I thought was happening in the world. There were just more than terrible things happening that I don't understand."

The subject matter of many of the songs can be considered darker than previous releases, as the themes include overdosing ("Pills"), an eating disorder and the acceptance of the body ("Drip") and trying to cut out an unhealthy relationship ("Cut the Cord").

In the run up to the album's release, two EPs were released. Each featured the title track and two bonus tracks. These bonus tracks were "Dust," "Empty Wells," "Crimson Sky" and "Apology", all written by Charlotte Martin.

== Track listing ==
All songs written by Charlotte Martin.

1. "Stromata"
2. "Cut the Cord"
3. "Drip"
4. "Little Universe"
5. "Civilized"
6. "A Hopeless Attempt"
7. "Four Walls"
8. "Inch"
9. "Keep Me in Your Pocket"
10. "Pills"
11. "Just Before Dawn"
12. "Cardboard Ladders"
13. "The Dance"
14. "Redeemed"
15. "Habit" (iTunes exclusive)
16. "Stromata" (Red Swan Remix) (iTunes exclusive)

== Musicians ==
| Charlotte Martin | Piano, keyboard, Synthesizer, Drum Programming, High Heels, Milk Jugs, Cardboard Boxes, String Arrangements, Synth Bass. |
| Ken Andrews | Synthesizer, Drum Programming, Bass, Guitar, Trains, Boiling water sounds, Poppers. |
| Joey Waronker | drums and percussion on "Civilized" and "Redeemed". |
| Emily Wright | Cello on "Pills" and "Just Before Dawn". |
