= Jasper Seamount =

Underwater volcano west of Baja California, Mexico

- Location within Pacific Ocean
- Summit depth: 700 m (2,297 ft)
- Height: 3,300 m (10,827 ft)
- Summit area: Total Volume: 690 km^{3} (166 mi^{3})

Location
- Location: west of Baja California, Mexico
- Coordinates: 30°26.40′N 122°44.40′W

Geology
- Volcanic arc/chain: Fieberling-Guadalupe seamount trail
- Age of rock: 11.5–10 million years
- Last activity: 4.1–4.8 MYA

Jasper Seamount is a seamount (underwater volcano) located in the Fieberling-Guadalupe seamount track, west of Baja California, Mexico. Jasper is the site of detailed geophysical geological and geochemical studies which suggest that many seamounts, big and small, follow the same pattern of growth and death that was originally used to describe the Hawaiian - Emperor seamount chain.

Jasper Seamount is an elongated volcano, with a northwest-northeast summit and several volcanic cones on the summit. The base is 4000 meters below sea level and it rises to a peak of 700 meters below sea level. A total of 15 dredge hauls from the seamount have been collected, and ocean-bottom seismometers have been placed to observe earthquake activity. In-depth studies have given scientists a detailed view of the seamount's internal structure.

The model developed by the Jasper Seamount studies closely resembles that of the Hawaiian Islands, especially the eruption, in stages, of increasingly alkalic rocks. More than 90% of the volcano is tholeiitic to alkalic basalt in a wide variety of forms, including pillow lava and vesicular lapilli, evidence of shallow submarine eruptions in the past, and a wide range of xenoliths.

Jasper Seamount formed 11.5–10 million years ago. Base volcanics are very similar to those found at Hawaii. The flanks formed about 8.7–7.5 million years ago, and its summit 4.8–4.1 million years ago. The maintenance of a near-constant silicon dioxide ratio in all of the rocks collected is a sign of increasingly lower degrees of mantle melting. Overall Jasper Seamount rock is very similar, even in trace elements, to Hawaiian volcanics, despite Jasper's much smaller size (690 km^{3} or 166 mi^{3} versus ~3,000 km^{3} or 720 mi^{3}). These results seem to show that the Hawaiian model could be applied to other seamounts as well, and that many seamounts go through the same processes regardless of their size.

== See also ==
- Graveyard Seamounts
- Mud volcano
- Muirfield Seamount
- Sedlo Seamount
- South Chamorro Seamount
