= Humanistic (album) =

2001 studio album by Abandoned Pools

Studio album by Abandoned Pools
- Released: September 25, 2001
- Recorded: Fall 1999–Spring 2001
- Studios: Tommy Walter's apartment (South Pasadena, California); Q Division Studios (Boston, Massachusetts); Space Slacker International (Silver Lake, Los Angeles)
- Genres: Electropop; pop rock; alternative rock post-grunge
- Length: 45:41
- Labels: Extasy; Warner Bros.
- Producers: Paul Q. Kolderie; Sean Slade; Tommy Walter

Abandoned Pools chronology
Humanistic (2001)	The Reverb EP (2005)

Singles from Humanistic
- 1. "The Remedy" Released: 2001; 2. "Mercy Kiss" Released: 2001

Humanistic is the debut album by Abandoned Pools. It was released in September 2001 through Extasy International. Though two songs were co-written by Pete Pagonis, the album is considered a solo work of Tommy Walter's in which he used new material, as well as several songs he'd worked on beforehand in both Tely and Metromax, to compose, record, and release.

The album features a contrast of dark, gloomy, and sometimes aggressive songs such as "The Remedy" and "Blood" and more serene, upbeat tracks like "Start Over" and "Sunny Day." Elements of industrial rock are evident in various ways; keyboard is used in light melody of the dark-lyric-themed "Ruin Your Life" as well as the raging chorus of "Fluorescein," and ambiguous, non-sung vocal recordings are featured in various tracks. Synth effects are also utilized in various songs. Four tracks include backing vocals by Angie Hart of Frente!. Hart's harmony style alongside Walter's somewhat androgynous voice creates a unique vocal chemistry. This album was mixed by Chris Lord-Alge and Matt Silva, and was mastered by Gavin Lurssen.

== Touring and promotion ==
While Humanistic was released in September 2001, the majority of promotion took place from early to mid-2002; indeed, the album and its singles did not begin to chart until March 2002 and commonly peaked around May. Leah Randi and Bryan Head filled out the ranks of bassist and drummer for the album's tour support. They had several successful tours, going across the country and headlining with acts such as Garbage and Lenny Kravitz.

A music video was produced for the lead single, "Mercy Kiss," and saw substantial airplay on MTV2. "The Remedy" and "Monster" were second and third video/single releases; however, the latter consisted of tour footage and was released long after the others via MTV's website. "Start Over" was also included on the National Lampoon's Van Wilder soundtrack in March 2002.

The group performed "The Remedy" on the June 5, 2002 edition of The Tonight Show with Jay Leno and the June 26 edition of The Late Late Show with Craig Kilborn. A large number of songs off Humanistic were also featured on the MTV animated series Clone High which debuted in November that year, with "Start Over" being the finale song of the show. However, after the series was dropped by MTV in February 2003, Abandoned Pools stopped touring (largely due to the dissolution of their label, Extasy Records).

== Reception ==
Professional ratings
Review scores
Source	Rating
AllMusic	3/5 stars
PopMatters	8/10 stars
musicOMH	3/5 stars

The album received overall high praise upon release. Jason Thompson of PopMatters compared Humanistic to Billy Corgan's solo work and noted it as much more successful. He went on to proclaim, "Humanistic is a fantastic album that could be considered a masterpiece of electro-pop... Walter has a gift for creating dense pop confections that manage to float like a feather even with all of their heaviness." Often referring to the 31-year-old as a "kid," Thom Jurek of AllMusic described Walter as a "harder-rock version of Tommy Gnosis: vulnerable, lost, and wanting desperately to put it all into terms that are rock & roll enough to make him stand out from the crowd."

== Track listing ==
All songs are written by Tommy Walter, except where noted.

Humanistic – Standard edition
No.	Title	Writer(s)	Length
1.	"The Remedy"		3:56
2.	"Mercy Kiss"		3:17
3.	"Start Over"	Tommy Walter, Pete Pagonis	4:02
4.	"Monster"		3:47
5.	"Blood"		4:13
6.	"Suburban Muse"		3:50
7.	"Sunny Day"		3:59
8.	"L.V.B.D."		3:25
9.	"Ruin Your Life"		3:45
10.	"Never"	Walter, Pagonis	3:38
11.	"Seed"		3:30
12.	"Fluorescein"		4:19
Total length:			45:41

== Personnel ==
=== Musicians ===
- Tommy Walter – vocals, instrumentation
- Josh Freese – drums
- Tim Dow – additional drums (track 1)
- Sean Slade – organ (track 2), clavinet (track 4), bass clarinet (track 7), piano (track 9), additional guitar (track 11)
- Angie Hart – backing vocals (tracks 3, 6, 7, 9)
- Paul Q. Kolderie – additional guitar (tracks 7, 9)

=== Technical ===
- Tommy Walter – production, programming
- Sean Slade – production
- Paul Q. Kolderie – production
- David Young – additional production
- Yoshiki – executive production
- Chris Lord-Alge – mixing
- Matt Silva – mixing assistance
- Gavin Lurssen – mastering
- Justin Smith – engineering (tracks 1–4, 6–9)

== Chart positions ==
Album

Year	Chart	Position
2002	Heatseekers	12
2002	Top Heatseekers (Northeast)	4
2002	Top Heatseekers (East North Central)	10
2002	Top Heatseekers (Pacific)	9
2002	Top Heatseekers (Middle Atlantic)	8

Singles

Year	Single	Chart	Position
2002	"The Remedy"	Hot Adult Top 40 Tracks	35
2002	"The Remedy"	Hot Modern Rock Tracks	27
