= Orphan Basin =

Area north- east of St. John's

The Orphan Basin is an area approximately 400 km east-north-east of St. John's, Newfoundland and Labrador in Canada. Two exploratory oil wells have been drilled there as it is estimated to have oil reserves of 26 billion barrels. Chevron intends to drill a third well in 2012.

== Introduction ==
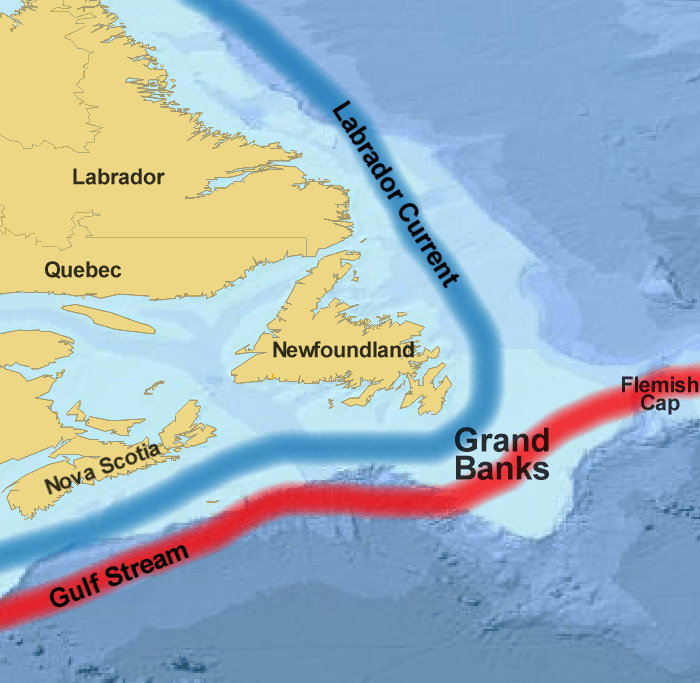
The Orphan Basin is located adjacent to the Grand Banks and the Flemish Cap

Taking its name from a nearby geographical feature of the Atlantic Ocean known as the Orphan Knoll, the Orphan Basin lies just to the north and is contiguous to the Grand Banks of Newfoundland. A wide Mesozoic rift zone, the basin spans 160,000 square kilometres and has been studied and explored by the oil and gas companies ExxonMobil, Chevron, Imperial Oil, and Shell Canada. The presence of Late Jurassic sedimentary formations (i.e. source rock) similar to those found in the fruitful nearby Jeanne d'Arc Basin makes this of particular interest to oil exploration. In contrast to this, by 2004, the area remained one of the least explored Mesozoic Atlantic oceanic basins.

The basin is divided into three areas for exploration purposes based on ocean water depth, namely: Shallow Water (200–500 metres), Intermediate Water (500–1500 metres), and Deepwater (1500–3000 metres). These areas span west to east.

== History of exploration ==
The first attempt at exploration of the western, shallow water region of the basin began in 1969 with Shell Canada. Seven subsequent exploration wells were drilled between 1974 and 1985 by various oil companies. However, these wells failed to penetrate the critical Late Jurassic section, which had been successful in the discovery of oil-rich rock sources for adjacent basins.

As of 2012, Chevron holds a 65% operational stake in the Orphan Basin. This stake also consists of an operational license covering 6,040 square kilometres. The company has already drilled two wells and plans to drill a third in late 2012.

== Geological setting and environment ==
Due to its geographical position on the continental margin of Newfoundland, the Orphan Basin we received significant proglacial deposits during the late Quaternary period, mostly from ice crossing the continental shelf. The Labrador Current also played a role, allowing icebergs and proglacial plumes to provide sediment from more distant sources. The western slope of the basin has been recognized as four separate areas based on geomorphology, namely the North Slope, the slope off Trinity Trough, the South Slope, and the slope off Sackville Spur.

The area has had several events combining extensive tectonic activity with the possibility of halokinesis. This has given rise to the development of hydrocarbon traps in the Mesozoic region of the basin. These traps are attractive for potential development by the oil & gas industry.

=== Climatology and biology ===
The climate of the basin is akin to that of the northern Grand Banks, with mean temperatures ranging from -5 °C to 16 °C. The month of August sees the warmest temperatures and February the coldest. As with the island of Newfoundland, the area is strongly influenced by weather systems that are passing through. These systems, often intense, are attributed to an overall dynamic climate. High winds of gale force (and above) and fog frequently afflict the basin.

Typical components of the ecosystem of the Orphan Basin are diverse and include sea birds, sea turtles, fish, marine mammals, and others. The area is home to a list of threatened and endangered species, including the Atlantic cod, blue whale, leatherback sea turtle, and northern bottlenose whale.

== Environmental impact of exploration ==
A variety of specific issues have been highlighted with respect to the environmental impact of oil exploration in the area. Noise disturbance from seismic surveys may have adverse effects on the marine mammal and fish populations. This can lead to detrimental impacts on fisheries, including the crab fishery, the most lucrative fishery for the province of Newfoundland. A large area of exploration in the basin is in deepwater, where delicate deep-sea corals and chemosynthetic organisms may reside. The pulses from seismic surveys and airguns involved in the exploration process may alter the swimming patterns of fish and interfere with the underwater communication of certain species of marine life. Diving sea birds may also be affected. High levels of noise from other related anthropogenic sources, such as boats and drilling operations, may mask the detection of weaker biologically important sounds of marine mammals.

Chemical wastes discharged during drilling operations are also of environmental concern. Among these, but not limited to, are greywater, blackwater, bilge water, and ballast water. Accidental events such spills of diesel fuel during vessel loading/unloading and oil or gas during blowouts also raise concerns for environmental damage.

Routine exploration and drilling activity in the basin can be conducted without much impact on the surrounding environment if activities are kept at a minimum and sensitive areas are avoided.

If an oil spill akin to that of the Deepwater Horizon in the Gulf of Mexico (2010) occurred in the basin, the environmental repercussions could be even worse. The Deepwater spill was due to the failure of the blowout preventer - a failure which may be attributed to the great depth of the well. The current Chevron well in the basin is almost twice as deep as the Deepwater Horizon well in the Gulf, possibly posing an increased risk for blowout preventer failure. Methane hydrate crystals, which form in low temperatures and high pressure, formed and prevented early attempts to plug the Gulf well. This pressure is doubled in the basin due to the increased ocean depth. Any rigs to drill a relief well in the event of a similar spill in the basin would have to be brought in from other areas, such as the Gulf of Mexico. This increased wait time for a relief well to be drilled, as well as the typically harsh weather conditions of the North Atlantic, would make a spill in this region particularly difficult.
