= Creeper Lagoon =

American indie rock band

- Origin: San Francisco, California, United States
- Genres: Rock; Indie
- Years active: 1991–present
- Labels: DreamWorks, Arena Rock, Neglektra
- Members: Sharky Laguana; Ian Sefchick; Dave Kostiner; Dan Carr
- Past members: Bush Brengleman; Steve Borgerding; Fraser McGill; Graham Bonnar; Alex Laipenicks; Patrick Magnan; Geoffrey Chisholm; Jason Bassler; Rachel Lastimosa; Miles Tuffli
- Website: www.creeperlagoon.com

Creeper Lagoon is a San Francisco indie-rock band originally started by Sharky Laguana as a solo project in 1991. They are currently on Laguana's digital record label, Neglektra.

== History ==
Sharky Laguana and Ian Sefchick both played in the Cincinnati, Ohio, punk band The Rottweilers while in high school. In 1990, Laguana moved out to San Francisco with his four-track and started Creeper Lagoon as a solo project. Sefchick moved to San Francisco some years later, did a brief stint with The Brian Jonestown Massacre, and then reunited with Laguana in Creeper Lagoon. The lineup was rounded out by bassist Geoffrey Chisholm and drummer Patrick Mangan (who was later replaced by David Kostiner).

In 2000, Creeper Lagoon had a music practice space at the Art Explosion Studios at 2425-17th Street in the Mission District; other bands in this space included Deerhoof, Beulah, Zmrzlina, Don't Mean Maybe, and S-- S-- Band Band.

The quartet released its self-titled five-song debut EP in 1997 on Oakland rap label Dogday. Four of those songs were reworked for the band's 1998 full-length debut, I Become Small and Go, released on the Dust Brothers vanity label, Nickelbag, and featured the production of Dust Brother John King on a few tracks. The band was named Spin magazine's Best New Artist in 1998.

Their success led them to the DreamWorks label for their follow-up, 2001's Take Back the Universe and Give Me Yesterday. After the album and subsequent tour, the band broke up, with Laguana retaining the band name. Creeper Lagoon went on to release an EP in 2002 (Remember the Future) and an album in 2006 (Long Dry Cold).

Creeper Lagoon's song "Under the Tracks" appears on the soundtrack of the 2002 film Orange County. The track has been falsely attributed to Coldplay on many music sites.
On December 6, 2016, the band announced an original-lineup reunion show on February 26, 2017, at Bottom of the Hill in San Francisco, CA.

== Members ==
Current

- Sharky Laguana (1991–present)
- Ian Sefchick (1997–2001, 2016–present)
- Dan Carr (2000–2001, 2016–present)
- Dave Kostiner (1999–2001, 2016–present)

Former

- Bush Brengleman (1991–1995, 1997–1998)
- Steve Borgerding (ex-Meices) (1995–1997)
- Fraser McGill (1995–1997)
- Graham Bonnar (ex-Swervedriver) (1995–1996)
- Alex Laipenicks (ex-MTX) (1996–1997)
- Patrick Mangan (patrik jay) (1995–1998)
- Geoffrey Chisholm (1997–1999)
- Walt Szalva (2001–2002)
- Jason Bassler (2002–2006)
- Rachel Lastimosa (2002–2006)
- Miles Tuffli (2002–2006)

== Discography ==
- Creeper Lagoon (cassette, Slabco Enterprises)
- Shasta Complex (cassette, Shrimper 1994)
- Death Sentence (cassette, Cactus Rum Recordings 1995)
- Creeper Lagoon vs The Dead (7" LP, Ratfish Records)
- Creeper Lagoon (EP, Dogday Records 1997)
- I Become Small and Go (NickelBag 1998, DreamWorks 2000)
- Wonderful Love (single, Nickelbag Records 1998)
- Dear Deadly (single, Nickelbag 1998, Shifty Disco 1998)
- Fountain (single, Subpop 7", 1998)
- Watering Ghost Garden (EP, SpinArt Records 2000)
- Take Back the Universe and Give Me Yesterday (DreamWorks 2001)
- Wrecking Ball (single, DreamWorks 2001)
- Insound Tour Support (Insound 2001)
- Remember the Future (EP, Arena Rock Recording Co. 2002)
- Long Dry Cold (Neglektra 2006)
