= Ruth (band) =

American Christian indie band

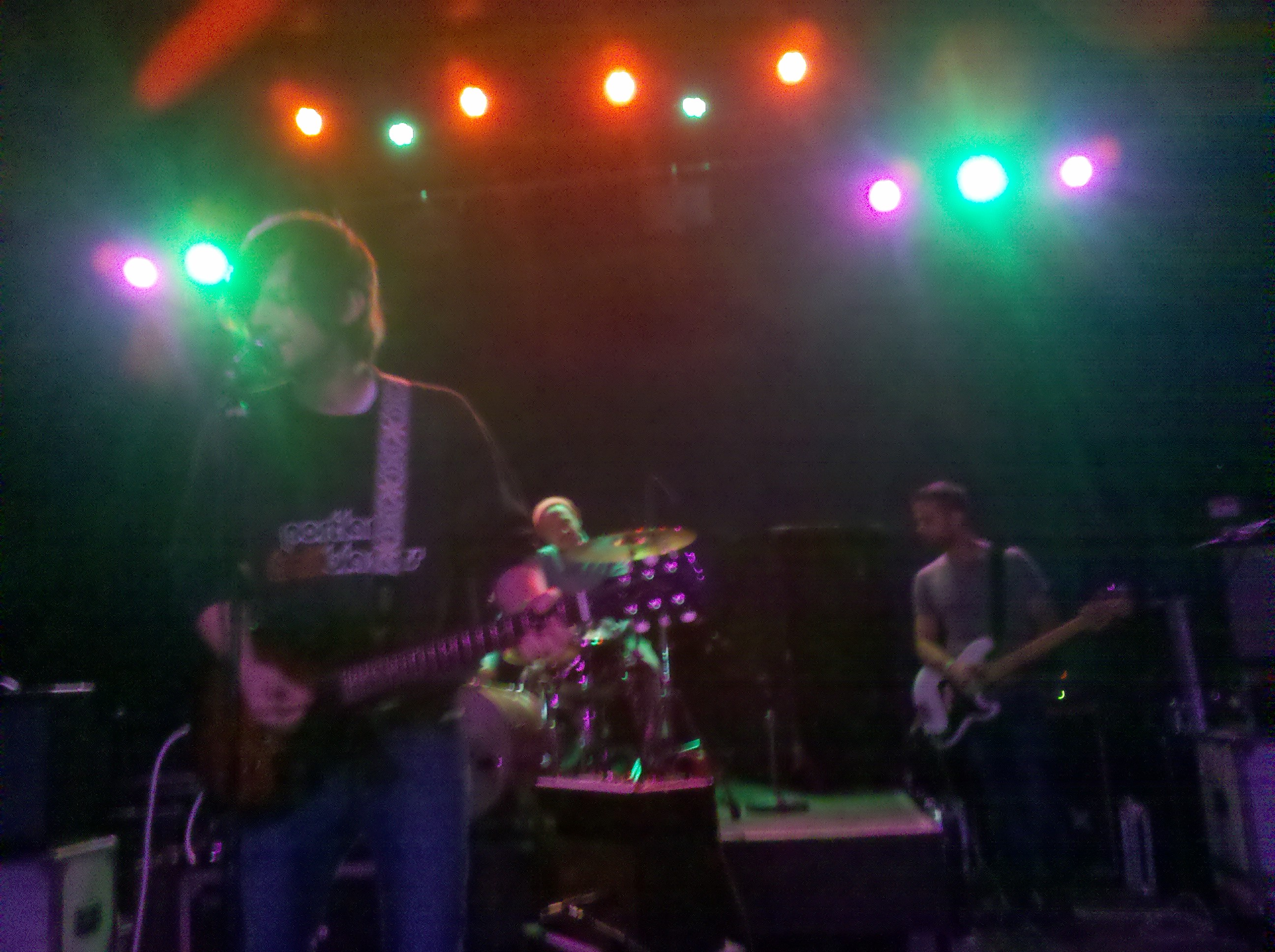

Background information
- Origin: Battle Ground, Washington, U.S.
- Genres: Indie rock
- Years active: 2005–present
- Labels: Tooth & Nail
- Members: Dustin Ruth; Nicholas Wiinikka; Jesse Counts; Ryan Peterson
- Past members: Daniel John Passera; Matt Roberts; Brett Van Liew; Justin Schiermeister; Reid VanAtta
- Website: ruththeband.com

Ruth is a four-piece Christian indie band from Battle Ground, Washington. Ruth's debut album, Secondhand Dreaming, was released on June 26, 2007.

== History ==
=== Formation ===
Dustin Ruth moved to Los Angeles to find band members to join him in forming a band. After searching for some time, he finally found a group of people in his hometown of Portland, Oregon who also wanted to form a band. The band's name "Ruth" is a reference to the lead singer's last name, and is also an acronym for "Return Us to Him".

In early 2006, they released a self-titled EP and promoted their music by playing concerts on the west coast of the United States. They were signed by Tooth & Nail Records in fall 2006, and began recording their full-length debut album.

=== Secondhand Dreaming ===
In November 2006, they finished recording their debut album, Secondhand Dreaming, with producer Aaron Sprinkle. It was released on June 26, 2007, and Ruth supported the album while on tour with label mates Emery and Surrogate. In late 2007, Ruth embarked on the "Appetite for Construction Tour" with Switchfoot and Relient K, a tour which supported the charity Habitat For Humanity.

=== Anorak ===
After the release of Secondhand Dreaming, the band began recording their second album Anorak in early 2008. They worked with Chris Keene of Surrogate as the album's producer, as well as Aaron Sprinkle again. The recording was completed in May 2008, and the album was released on October 28, 2008, in the United States.

=== The Covers EP ===
In April 2009, Ruth toured with Falling Up on their Fangs! tour. On August 25, 2009, Ruth digitally released a five-song EP covering artists such as Coldplay, Tracy Chapman, Buddy Holly; Mr. Big, a rock band; and The Everly Brothers. The first song to be released was the cover of Coldplay's "Fix You".

As of January 13, 2010, Ruth was no longer signed to Tooth & Nail. The band is still active, but is currently independent.

=== Payola ===
In November 2011, they released a video of a new song, "Life is Just a Dream". The song was included in Ruth's album Payola, released on March 6, 2012, in partnership with MTV.

=== Philanthropic ===
All proceeds from the song "Rosa Dear" during the month of February 2016 were donated to Vet Ranch, a foundation which uses user-donated funds to help treat and care for animals (usually those on the brink of being euthanized).

== Members ==
=== Current members ===
- Dustin Ruth — lead singer, guitar, harmonica
- Nicholas Wiinikka – lead guitar
- Jesse Counts – bass
- Ryan Peterson – drums

=== Former members ===
- Matt Roberts – drums
- Daniel Passera – drums
- Justin Schiermeister – bass
- Brett Van Liew – bass
- Reid VanAtta – drums
- Cody Ray Thompson – drums

== Discography ==
=== Albums ===
- Voilà – (2014)
- Payola – In Partnership with MTV (2012)
- The Covers EP – Tooth & Nail Records (2009)
- Anorak – Tooth & Nail Records (2008)
- Secondhand Dreaming – Tooth & Nail Records (2007)
- Ruth EP – independent (2006)

=== Singles ===
- 2007: "Cross the Line"
- 2007: "You Are", No. 16 on the R&R magazine November 17, 2007 chart
- 2008: "One Foot In, One Foot Out"
- 2008: "Back to the Five"

=== TV and multimedia placements ===
Vet Ranch (YouTube)

- Rosa Dear

Happy Endings (ABC)

- You've Changed

Fox Family Countdown (FOX)

- Back to the Five

Teen Mom 2 (MTV)

- My One and Only

Punk'd (MTV)

- You've Changed

10 on Top (MTV)

- Life Is Just A Dream
- Alone

Friendzone (MTV)

- My One And Only
- Summer Fire
- Darling Why?
- Alone
- You've Changed

Made (MTV)

- My One and Only

The Real World: St. Thomas (MTV)

- My One and Only
- Life Is Just A Dream

Underemployed (MTV)

- Love & Craigslist

I'm Married To A... (VH1)

- Life Is Just A Dream

My Big Redneck Vacation (CMT)

- Love & Craigslist

Sell This House Extreme (A&E)

- Darling Why?

KTLA (KTLA)

- Summer Fire
