= Take Back the Universe and Give Me Yesterday =

Studio album by Creeper Lagoon
- Released: 2001
- Genre: Indie rock
- Length: 50:31
- Label: DreamWorks SKG
- Producer: Dave Fridmann, Greg Wells, Mark Trombino, Rick Stone, Jerry Harrison, Creeper Lagoon

Professional ratings
Aggregate scores
Source	Rating
Metacritic	(71/100)
Review scores
Source	Rating
Entertainment Weekly	B link
NME	link
Pitchfork Media	4.9/10 link
PopMatters	(favorable) link
Robert Christgau	link
Spin	(mixed) link

Take Back the Universe and Give Me Yesterday is a studio album by Creeper Lagoon. The song "Wrecking Ball" was featured in the films Vanilla Sky and Hellboy. The song "Under the Tracks" was featured in the movie Orange County.

== Track listing ==
1. "Chance of a Lifetime" – 3:45
2. "Wrecking Ball" – 4:03
3. "Sunfair" – 3:51
4. "She Loves Me Not" – 1:04
5. "Up All Night" – 3:10
6. "Naked Days" – 5:02
7. "Under the Tracks" – 4:16
8. "Dead Man Saloon" – 3:28
9. "Hey Sister" – 3:07
10. "Cellophane" – 3:48
11. "Keep from Moving" – 7:15
12. "Lover's Leap" – 4:03
13. "Here We Are" – 3:37

== Additional musicians ==
- Jerry Harrison – Swirly keyboard instruments on "Under the Tracks"
- Mark Endert – additional arrangement and mutator electronics on "Wrecking Ball"
- Natalie Jackson – background vocals on "Keep from Moving"
- Ken Andrews – additional background vocals on "Sunfair"

== Production credits ==
- Producers: Dave Fridmann, Greg Wells, Mark Trombino, Rick Stone, Jerry Harrison, Creeper Lagoon
- Engineers: Tom Banghart, Eric Thorngren, Dave Fridmann, Creeper Lagoon
- Mixed by: Ken Andrews, Tom Lord-Alge, Creeper Lagoon
