= Anorak (album) =

Studio album by Ruth
- Released: October 28, 2008
- Genre: Rock, indie rock
- Length: 37:25
- Label: Tooth & Nail
- Producer: Chris Keene, Aaron Sprinkle

Ruth chronology
Secondhand Dreaming (2007)	Anorak (2008)	Payola (2012)

Professional ratings
Review scores
Source	Rating
The Album Project	4/5 stars
AllMusic	4.0/5 stars
Christian Music Zine	C
The Cleveland Leader	(not rated)
Jesus Freak Hideout	4/5 stars
Soul-Audio.com	7/10

Anorak is the second album by the band Ruth. They completed recording this album in May 2008 and is their most successful album to date. It was released on October 28, 2008 through Tooth & Nail Records. The lead single "Back to the Five" has become a minor hit in Christian radio. There is a music video for the song as well. The video placed on the X 2009 DVD Christian rock hits compilation.

== Track listing ==
1. "Hibernation Pieces"
2. "Back to the Five"
3. "Who I Was and Who I Am"
4. "Rolling With the Punches"
5. "Hearts on Sleeves"
6. "Pure Concept"
7. "Forgetting to Remember"
8. "Nothing to Hide"
9. "Miracle Photo"
10. "Speechless Mess"
11. "Dead Giveaway"
