= Sedlo Seamount =

Isolated underwater volcano in the Northeast Atlantic, northeast of Graciosa Island

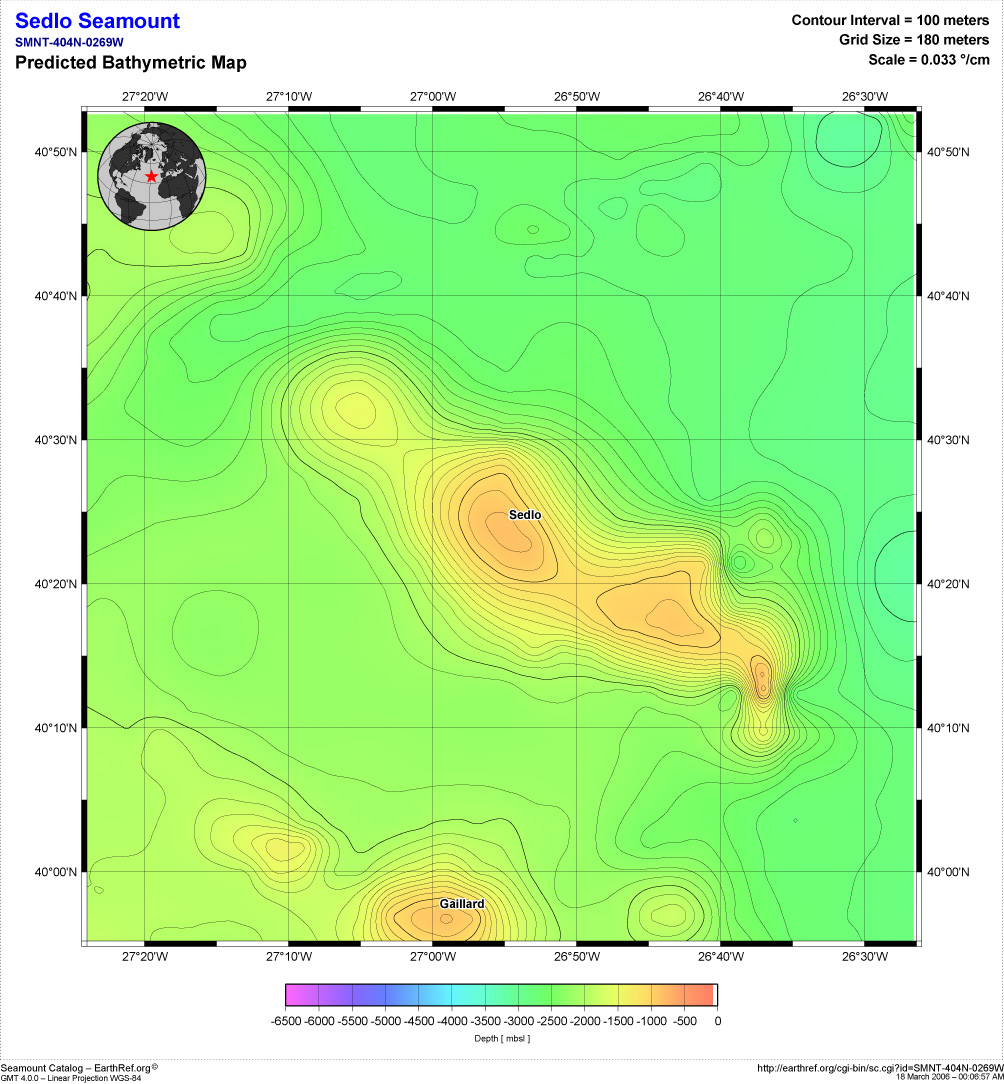
- Bathymetric map

- Location within Atlantic Ocean
- Summit depth: 660 m (2,165 ft)
- Height: ~ 2,340 m (7,677 ft)
- Summit area: 75 by 30 km (47 by 19 mi)

Location
- Coordinates: 40°12.8′N 26°15.8′W
- Country: Azores (EEZ)

Geology
- Type: Seamount (underwater volcano) and tablemount
- Volcanic arc/chain: Isolated

Sedlo Seamount is an isolated seamount and underwater volcano located in the Northeast Atlantic, 180 mi (290 km) northeast of Graciosa Island. It has an elongate structure, roughly 75 by 30 km (47 by 19 mi). The summit is flat with three peaks. Sedlo Seamount sits on the ocean floor 3,000 m (9,843 ft) deep, and rises to within 660 m (2,165 ft) of the surface. Sedlo seamount has a tablemount structure, indicating that the peak of the seamount had once been above the water, but has since been ground down by persistent erosion to its current height. The seamount stands within the Exclusive Economic Zone of the Azores.

From 2002 to 2005, Sedlo Seamount was the target of a focused multidisciplinary study by the EU (titled OASIS), much of the research of which was published in 2009.

Complex hydrographical patterns with anticyclones and Taylor columns cause water flow around the summit. Water eddies tend to disrupt this flow. A bottom trawling experiment conducted during research brought up large orange roughy (Hoplostethus atlanticus) aggregations, as well as bycatch of benthic fauna including sponges, gorgonians, and scleractinian corals.

European Commission has enacted rules that protect Sedlo from bottom trawling, gillnets, and trammel nets. In 2007, Portugal proposed for Sedlo's inclusion in the OSPAR series of Marine Protected Areas. The motion was accepted in 2008, and a management plan for the MPA was being drafted. The MPA protects an area 62 by 65 km (39 by 40 mi).

== See also ==
- Jasper Seamount
- Graveyard Seamounts
- Mud volcano
- Muirfield Seamount
- South Chamorro Seamount
