= Beautiful Freak =

1996 studio album by Eels

Studio album by Eels
- Released: August 13, 1996
- Recorded: June 1993 – December 1995
- Studios: Conway studios Hollywood, Onehitsville
- Genres: Alternative rock; post-grunge
- Length: 43:53
- Label: DreamWorks
- Producers: Jon Brion; E; Mark Goldenberg; Michael Simpson

Eels chronology
Beautiful Freak (1996)	Electro-Shock Blues (1998)

Singles from Beautiful Freak
- 1. "Novocaine for the Soul" Released: July 1996; 2. "Susan's House" Released: 1996; 3. "Rags to Rags" Released: 1996; 4. "Your Lucky Day in Hell" Released: 1996; 5. "Beautiful Freak" Released: 1997

Beautiful Freak is the debut studio album by American rock band Eels. It was released on 13 August 1996 and is the second album released by record label DreamWorks.

== Background ==
Beautiful Freak is the first album using the full band name Eels, in an attempt to get the records in the same general location in the stores as frontman Mark Oliver Everett's previous works under the name "E".

== Recording ==
Beautiful Freak was produced by E, Jon Brion, Mark Goldenberg and Michael Simpson. The majority of the album was recorded from 1993 to 1995, with first single "Novocaine for the Soul" (which contains a sample of "Yes, She Knows" by Tubby Chess and His Candy Stripe Twisters) having been recorded and mixed as early as 1993. "Susan's House" contains a sample of "Love Finds Its Own Way" by Gladys Knight & the Pips; "Guest List" contains a sample of "I Like It" by The Emotions; and "Flower" contains sample of "I'm Glad You're Mine" by Al Green.

== Artwork ==
Everett had suggested having a little girl with big eyes on the cover. The girl that came in to have her picture taken incidentally looked "like a miniature Susan" to Everett, referring to his ex-girlfriend and the subject of the song "Susan's House".

== Release ==
Beautiful Freak was released on August 13, 1996, by DreamWorks Records, a subdivision of the newly created film company DreamWorks Pictures (also known as DreamWorks SKG), which had additional subdivisions for animation, television and video games. The main film division itself did not start releasing films until September 26, 1997, when The Peacemaker premiered. Beautiful Freak was the first rock album released on the label, with its inaugural release having been George Michael's Older. Michael's Older album features DreamWorks' logo of a boy fishing and sitting on a moon crescent. This moon logo was used for other divisions of DreamWorks, eventually being turned into a 25 second long CGI opening logo when DreamWorks Pictures started releasing films in September 1997. However, starting with Beautiful Freak, every DreamWorks Records album featured a different thought bubble logo to represent DreamWorks Records. This alternate thought bubble logo was designed by artist Roy Lichtenstein, and was his last commission before his death on September 29, 1997.

The album peaked at number 5 on the UK Albums Chart. Four singles were released to promote the album: "Novocaine for the Soul" in February 1996, "Susan's House" in May, "Your Lucky Day in Hell" in September, and the title track the following year.

The April 1997 German release of the album included a bonus live EP from a BBC recording session.

== Reception ==
Professional ratings
Review scores
Source	Rating
AllMusic	4/5 stars
The Boston Phoenix	3/4 stars
Encyclopedia of Popular Music	5/5 stars
Entertainment Weekly	B
The Guardian	4/5 stars
Los Angeles Times	3.5/4 stars
NME	5/10
Q	4/5 stars
The Rolling Stone Album Guide	3/5 stars
Select	5/5

In a contemporary review of Beautiful Freak, Q praised the album as "a complete musical vision, a genre-spanning soundscape that reels you in with its myriad hooks". Robert Hilburn of the Los Angeles Times wrote that "Eels' maverick vision reminds you of all the great Los Angeles bands, from the Flying Burrito Brothers to X, that have chronicled the outsider, underdog attitude in the shadows of a record industry that never embraces them commercially." Ethan Smith of Entertainment Weekly stated that "the Eels' postgrunge pop melodies and quirky, intelligent production make for catchy modern rock that's miles ahead of the competition", but felt that E's "attempts at warts-and-all portrayals of urban life come off as a disingenuous, arty pose" and that "a little less pretension would get these guys a lot further." Chicago Tribune critic Mark Caro was less favorable, writing that E's lyrics paint him as "either naive and self-absorbed or patronizing and calculating". The Village Voice's Robert Christgau assigned the album a "dud" rating, indicating "a bad record whose details rarely merit further thought."

In his retrospective review, James Chrispell of AllMusic wrote: "Concise pop tunes form the backbone of the album, yet tinges of despair and downright meanness surface just when you've been lulled into thinking this is another pop group". Trouser Press wrote that "E's material works best when he finds the rare balance between his misanthropy and his capacity for warmth."

== Legacy ==
It was voted number 666 in the third edition of Colin Larkin's All Time Top 1000 Albums (2000). The album was included in the book 1001 Albums You Must Hear Before You Die.

Beautiful Freak is among the albums included in the 2015 compilation The Complete DreamWorks Albums, which collected the albums which Eels recorded under the label. This compilation was released by Universal Music Group, who shut down DreamWorks Records after purchasing it in November 2003, although it still has the DreamWorks Records thought bubble logo on the back of the packaging.

== Track listing ==
All tracks are written by E, except where noted.

No.	Title	Writer(s)	Length
1.	"Novocaine for the Soul"	E; Mark Goldenberg	3:08
2.	"Susan's House"	E; Jim Jacobsen; Jim Weatherly	3:43
3.	"Rags to Rags"		3:53
4.	"Beautiful Freak"		3:34
5.	"Not Ready Yet"	Jon Brion; E	4:46
6.	"My Beloved Monster"		2:13
7.	"Flower"	E; Jim Jacobsen	3:38
8.	"Guest List"		3:13
9.	"Mental"		4:01
10.	"Spunky"		3:11
11.	"Your Lucky Day in Hell"	E; Mark Goldenberg	4:28
12.	"Manchild"	E; Jill Sobule	4:05
Total length:			43:53

German edition bonus disc The April 14, 1997 German release of the album included a bonus live EP from a BBC recording session

No.	Title	Writer(s)	Length
1.	"Novocaine for the Soul"	E; Goldenberg	3:22
2.	"Manchester Girl"		3:21
3.	"My Beloved Mad Monster Party"		2:34
4.	"Flower"	E; Jacbosen	3:17
Total length:			12:34

== Personnel ==
Eels

- Butch – drums, backing vocals, production, engineering
- E – vocals, guitar, Wurlitzer electric piano, production, engineering
- Tommy Walter – bass guitar, backing vocals

Additional musicians

- Jon Brion – guitar, trombone, Chamberlin
- Mark Goldenberg – guitar, keyboards, production, engineering
- Jim Jacobsen – keyboards, loops, engineering

Technical

- Michael Simpson – production, mixing
- Jon Brion – production, engineering
- Amir Derakh – engineering
- Matt Thorne – engineering
- Billy Kinsley – mixing
- Rob Seifert – mixing
- Stephen Marcussen – mastering
- Ann Giordano – photography
- Francesca Restrepo – art direction, sleeve design

== Charts ==
=== Weekly charts ===
1996–1997 chart performance for Beautiful Freak
Chart (1996–1997)	Peak position
Australian Albums (ARIA)	71
Belgian Albums (Ultratop Flanders)	19
Belgian Albums (Ultratop Wallonia)	36
Dutch Albums (Album Top 100)	32
French Albums (SNEP)	17
Scottish Albums (Official Charts)	9
UK Albums (Official Charts)	5
US Billboard 200	114

2026 chart performance for Beautiful Freak
Chart (2026)	Peak position
UK Independent Albums (Official Charts)	25

=== Year-end charts ===
Year-end chart performance for Beautiful Freak
Chart (1997)	Position
Belgian Albums (Ultratop Flanders)	83
UK Albums (OCC)	80

== Certifications and sales ==
Sales certifications for Beautiful Freak
Region	Certification	Certified units/sales
Belgium (BRMA)	Gold	25,000^{*}
France (SNEP)	Gold	100,000^{*}
United Kingdom (BPI)	Platinum	300,000^{^}
United States	—	189,000
Summaries
Worldwide	—	700,000
^{*} Sales figures based on certification alone.^{^} Shipments figures based on certification alone.
