= Year of the Rabbit (band) =

American rock group

Year of the Rabbit was a rock band assembled and fronted by Ken Andrews, formerly of Failure and ON. After the commercial disappointment of ON, Andrews and ON's touring drummer Tim Dow (formerly of Shiner and Season to Risk) first recruited Dow's friend Jeff Garber (lead guitar/background vocals, formerly of National Skyline and Castor). Solomon Snyder (bass/background vocals, formerly of Cupcakes and Dovetail Joint) came on board shortly thereafter. Whereas ON's material had been created mostly by Andrews as a solo project, the harder-rocking sound of Year of the Rabbit was much closer to that of his previous band, Failure.

Their first release, the 2003 EP Hunted, was made available only from CD Baby, the iTunes Store, and the band themselves. It was enough to attract the attention of Elektra Records, who released their self-titled album the following July. Unfortunately for the band, however, Elektra's parent company, Warner Music Group, was sold in February 2004 to a group of private investors, who decided to fold Elektra into Atlantic Records, and many of the labels' underperforming acts, including Year of the Rabbit, were dropped from their rosters. Two months later, Andrews declared on his official website that due to the shakeup at their label, the band had been put on indefinite hiatus.

Andrews returned to Failure in 2014, following their reunion.

== Discography ==
- Hunted EP (2003)
- Year of the Rabbit (2003)
