= Armed to the Teeth (Abandoned Pools album) =

Studio album by Abandoned Pools
- Released: September 27, 2005
- Recorded: 2005
- Studios: The Boat, Silver Lake, Los Angeles, California
- Genres: Alternative rock; pop rock; Midwest emo; emo pop
- Length: 53:11
- Label: Universal
- Producers: Gareth Jones; Tommy Walter

Abandoned Pools chronology
| The Reverb EP (2005) | Armed to the Teeth (2005) | Sublime Currency (2012) |

Professional ratings
Review scores
| Source | Rating |
|---|---|
| AllMusic | 3.5/5 stars |
| NeuFutur | (5.0/10) |
| Punknews | 1.5/5 stars |

Armed to the Teeth is the second studio album by the American rock band Abandoned Pools. It was released on September 27, 2005, through Universal Records. The album is preceded by The Reverb EP, released June 7. The album mostly consists of emo-pop and alternative rock songs, with some influences from other genres such as dream pop and post-punk.

The tracks "Tighter Noose" and "Waiting to Panic" originally appeared on The Reverb EP, but were then both re-recorded for this album.

== Track listing ==
All lyrics are written by Tommy Walter; all music is composed by Tommy Walter, Brian Head, Sean Woolstenhulme.

| No. | Title | Length |
|---|---|---|
| 1. | "Lethal Killers" | 4:07 |
| 2. | "Rabble" | 3:59 |
| 3. | "The Catalyst" | 4:15 |
| 4. | "Tighter Noose" | 5:40 |
| 5. | "Waiting to Panic" | 3:35 |
| 6. | "Hunting (The Universe Breaks My Heart)" | 4:57 |
| 7. | "Armed to the Teeth" | 3:17 |
| 8. | "Sooner or Later" | 5:49 |
| 9. | "Sailing Seas" | 4:00 |
| 10. | "Renegade" | 3:16 |
| 11. | "Maybe Then Someday" | 3:46 |
| 12. | "Goodbye Song" | 6:30 |
| Total length: | | 53:11 |

iTunes bonus track
| No. | Title | Length |
|---|---|---|
| 13. | "Lucky" | 3:52 |
| Total length: | | 57:03 |

== Personnel ==
Abandoned Pools

- Tommy Walter – Lead vocals, rhythm guitar, bass guitar, keyboards, French horn on "Hunting (The Universe Breaks My Heart)"
- Brian Head – Drums, percussion
- Sean Woolstenhulme – Lead guitar, backing vocals

Management

- Tonly Ciulla – Management
- Justin Eshak, Tom MacKay – A&R

Artwork

- T.J. River – Art direction, design
- Minori Marukami, Zoren Gold – Photography

Production

- Gareth Jones – Producer
- Adam Moseley – Engineer
- Danny Kalb – Assistant engineer
- Steve Marcussen – Mastering
- Ken Andrews – Mixing
- Stewart Whitmore – Digital editing

Additional musicians

- Emily Wright – Cello on tracks: 4, 8, 10–12
- Jian Wang – (tracks: 4, 11 to 12) – Tommy Walter (tracks: 6)
- Billy Howerdel – Additional guitar on track: 10
- Multitrack Murder, Scott Garret – Loops
- Alma Fernandez, Han Oh – Viola on tracks: 4, 11, 12
- Arman Anassian, Erlinda Romero-Anassian, Nathan Lanier, & Victoria Lanier – Violin on tracks: 4, 11, 12
