= Les Orphan =

Welsh footballer

Personal information
- Full name: Leslie James Orphan
- Date of birth: 17 April 1923
- Place of birth: Newport, Wales
- Date of death: 11 September 1995 (aged 72)
- Place of death: Newport, Wales
- Position: Inside forward

Senior career*
Years	Team	Apps	(Gls)
–1949	Girlings		
1949	Newport County	1	(0)
- Lovell's Athletic

International career
1949	Wales Amateurs	1	(0)
- * Club domestic league appearances and goals

Leslie James Orphan (17 April 1923 – 11 September 1995) was a Welsh amateur footballer who made one appearance as an inside forward in the Football League for Newport County. He was capped by Wales at amateur level.
