= Susan's House =

1997 single by Eels

Single by Eels

from the album Beautiful Freak
- Released: 1996
- Genre: Alternative rock; trip hop; spoken word
- Length: 3:56
- Label: DreamWorks
- Songwriters: E; Jim Weatherly; Jim Jacobsen

Eels singles chronology
"Novocaine for the Soul" (1996)	"Susan's House" (1996)	"Your Lucky Day in Hell" (1997)

"Susan's House" is a song by American rock band Eels. It was released as the third single from their 1996 debut album, Beautiful Freak.

== Content ==
In his autobiography, Mark Oliver Everett states that Susan "wasn't a crazy girl, a rare exception at the time". Her house was in Pasadena, not a walkable distance from where Everett lived at the time. The song focuses on the social problems in the area he walks through as he goes over to visit her. By the time of recording the song, he and Susan had already been apart a few years. Susan is also the subject of the song "Beautiful Freak" from the same album.

The song samples the piano introduction from the 1974 Gladys Knight & the Pips track "Love Finds Its Own Way", written by Jim Weatherly, who, along with Jim Jacobsen, is credited as co-writing "Susan's House" on both the original single and album.

== Release ==
"Susan's House" reached number 9 on the UK Singles Chart, the group's highest-charting single in the country as of 2026.

== Track listing ==
No.	Title	Writer(s)	Length
1.	"Susan's House"	E; Jim Weatherly; Jim Jacobsen	3:56
2.	"Stepmother"
3.	"Manchester Girl" (BBC Radio 1 version)	E	3:21

== Charts ==
Chart (1997)	Peak position
UK Singles (Official Charts)	9
