= Your Lucky Day in Hell =

Single by Eels

from the album Beautiful Freak
- B-side: "Altar Boy"; "Susan's Apartment"
- Released: 1997
- Genre: Alternative rock
- Length: 4:25
- Label: DreamWorks
- Songwriters: E; Mark Goldenberg
- Producers: E; Mark Goldenberg

Eels singles chronology
"Susan's House" (1997)	"Your Lucky Day in Hell" (1997)	"Last Stop: This Town" (1998)

"Your Lucky Day in Hell" is a song by American rock band Eels, released in 1997 as the fourth single from their debut album, Beautiful Freak (1996).

== Music video ==
Around the same time, a video was released to promote the single, featuring various shots filmed with high-8 cameras. This video featured a remixed version of the song. This remix also received moderate airplay on U.S. modern rock stations. The video was shown on MTV's 12 Angry Viewers and was aired several times on 120 Minutes between December 1997 and January 1998.

== B-sides ==
The 7" vinyl and the CD single contain a cover of the Rickie Lee Jones song "Altar Boy". The CD single had "Susan's Apartment" as a bonus track. Both songs were included on the compilation album B-Sides & Rarities 1996–2003.

== Release ==
Released on August 27, 1997, it fared less well commercially than the album's previous singles, stalling at number 35 in the UK Singles Chart in September 1997, thereby failing to repeat the prior singles' Top 10 success.

== Legacy ==
"Your Lucky Day in Hell" was featured in the films Scream 2 (1997), Grosse Pointe Blank (1997), The Maker (1997), Dead Man on Campus (1998) and Yes Man (2008).

== Track listing ==
CD

No.	Title	Writer(s)	Length
1.	"Your Lucky Day in Hell"	E, Mark Goldenberg	4:25
2.	"Susan's Apartment"	E, Jim Jacobsen	3:27
3.	"Altar Boy"	Rickie Lee Jones	3:10

7" vinyl

Side A
No.	Title	Writer(s)	Length
1.	"Your Lucky Day in Hell"	E, Goldenberg	4:25

Side B
No.	Title	Writer(s)	Length
2.	"Altar Boy"	Jones	3:10

Cassette

Both sides
No.	Title	Writer(s)	Length
1.	"Your Lucky Day in Hell"	E, Goldenberg	4:25
2.	"Altar Boy"	Jones	3:10
