= Orphan Knoll =

Undersea peak off the coast of Newfoundland, Canada

Location
- Country: Canada

Orphan Knoll is an undersea peak, horst and continental fragment located in the Atlantic Ocean off the northeast coast of Newfoundland, with mounds on it rising up to 1,800 meters from the surface. It was above sea level in the Middle Jurassic Period, and was left behind when Europe and Newfoundland separated during the formation of the North Atlantic, thus giving the peak its name. Due to its isolation, it is a hotspot for marine life and is home to corals, sponges, and endemics.
