= Novocaine for the Soul =

1996 song by Eels

Single by Eels

from the album Beautiful Freak
- Released: July 1996
- Length: 3:08
- Label: DreamWorks
- Songwriters: Mark Oliver Everett; Mark Goldenberg
- Producer: Mark Oliver Everett

Eels singles chronology
"Novocaine for the Soul" (1996)	"Susan's House" (1997)

Music video
- "Novocaine for the Soul" on YouTube

"Novocaine for the Soul" is a song by American rock band Eels. It was released in mid-July 1996 as the lead single from their debut album, Beautiful Freak. The song charted in several countries including the United States, Canada, the United Kingdom, and the Netherlands.

== Background ==
Discussing the song's subject matter in 1996, Eels frontman E said, "Part of my problem is with intimacy. 'Novocaine for the Soul' sounds detached because it's about detachment. That's what I think is so great about that song, and on that level I think it's almost genius. It's detachment personified. I'm singing about numbness and I'm numb. It's about having too much feeling."

== Release and reception ==
The NME made the song their single of the week, noting that although it was a "clinically produced, almost entirely cynical exposition of self-pitying middle-clas misery, it is almost impossible not to do as Eels themselves would, and sniffle, albiet slightly ironically."

After Steven Spielberg, Jeffrey Katzenberg and David Geffen signed the band to their then-newly formed record label DreamWorks Records, "Novocaine for the Soul" brought Eels international success, most notably in the United Kingdom, where it reached number 10 on the UK Singles Chart in February 1997. It also reached number one on the Billboard Modern Rock Tracks chart for two weeks in October 1996, and remained on the chart for 25 weeks. In Australia, "Novocaine for the Soul" peaked at number 84 in October 1996.

== Music video ==
The music video was directed by Mark Romanek and features E and the other band members suspended on wires, making them appear to be flying. The video was nominated for two MTV Music Video Awards for Best Cinematography in a Video Jeff Cronenweth and Best Special Effects in a Video Ash Beck.

== Track listing ==
No.	Title	Writer(s)	Length
1.	"Novocaine for the Soul"	Mark Oliver Everett; Mark Goldenberg	3:08
2.	"Guest List"	Everett	3:13
3.	"My Beloved Monster" (live from Tennessee)	Everett	2:13
4.	"Fucker"

== Charts ==
=== Weekly charts ===
Chart (1996–1997)	Peak position
Australia (ARIA)	84
Canada Top Singles (RPM)	76
Canada Rock/Alternative (RPM)	1
Netherlands (Single Top 100)	90
Scottish Singles Sales (Official Charts)	7
UK Singles (Official Charts)	10
US Radio Songs (Billboard)	39
US Alternative Airplay (Billboard)	1

=== Year-end charts ===
Chart (1996)	Position
Canada Rock/Alternative (RPM)	25
US Modern Rock Tracks (Billboard)	23

Chart (1997)	Position
UK Singles (OCC)	200

== Certifications ==
Region	Certification	Certified units/sales
United Kingdom (BPI)	Silver	200,000^{‡}
^{‡} Sales+streaming figures based on certification alone.

== Release history ==
Region	Date	Format(s)	Label(s)	Ref.
United States	July 1996	Mainstream rock; modern rock radio	DreamWorks	
United States	September 17, 1996	Contemporary hit radio	DreamWorks	
United Kingdom	February 3, 1997	7-inch vinyl; CD; cassette	DreamWorks	

== Covers ==
- Portugal. The Man featuring Sir Chloe, released September 2021 (packaged as a single with a cover of Len's "Steal My Sunshine" featuring Cherry Glazerr on the other side)

== See also ==
- Number one modern rock hits of 1996
- List of RPM Rock/Alternative number-one singles (Canada)
