= Replicant (disambiguation) =

Replicant is a type of bioengineered android from the 1982 science fiction film Blade Runner.

Replicant may refer to:

== Arts and entertainment ==
- Replicant (film), 2001 film by Ringo Lam.
- "The Replicants" (episode), a 2017 TV episode of Ancient Aliens, see List of Ancient Aliens episodes
- Nier (video game), which had releases with subtitles of Replicant and Gestalt. The game has bioengineered humans similar to replicants in Blade Runner.
- "Replicants", an artwork by Roxy Paine
- Replicant (DC Comics), a DC Comics character associated with Sideways (comics)
- "Replicants," 2025 episode of The Bear TV series

=== Music ===
- Replicants (band), American rock band.
  - Replicants (album), 1995 album by the eponymous band
- Alexandre Azaria (also known by the alias Replicant), a French composer, guitarist and film soundtrack writer.

Songs

- "Replicant" (song), a 2019 song by Delta Heavy off the album Only in Dreams (Delta Heavy album)
- "Replicants" (song), 2010 song by Ash
- "Replicant" (song), a 2009 song by Deux Ex Machina off the album I, Human
- "The Replicant" (song), a 1992 song by Covenant (band)

Fictional music topics

- "The Replicants", backing band for singer Priss, a fictional character from Bubblegum Crisis fictional universe

== Other uses ==
- Replicant, Desktop Widgets found in the Haiku operating system.
- Replicant (operating system), a fully free Android-like distribution.

== See also ==
- Replikants, a side project of American band Unwound
- Replicante, a Mexican magazine
