= Free Mars =

Studio album by Lusk
- Released: April 15, 1997
- Recorded: 1996, Contemporary Pimple Studios
- Genre: Psychedelic rock; psychedelic pop; experimental rock; shoegazing
- Length: 66:13
- Label: Zoo / Volcano
- Producer: Paul D'Amour, Chris Pitman

Professional ratings
Review scores
Source	Rating
Allmusic	3/5 stars

Free Mars is the only album by the experimental psychedelic rock project Lusk, released in 1997 in a Digipak-style case. The album features an appearance by Tool drummer Danny Carey, as well as an assortment of artists and musicians from the Los Angeles scene. Lusk's members included Paul D'Amour (formerly of Tool), Brad Laner (Medicine), Chris Pitman (Guns N' Roses), and Failure and Autolux member Greg Edwards . (D'Amour, Edwards, and Pitman were also members of Replicants.)

It was the final album released by Zoo Entertainment, which was also the label of Tool, as it was absorbed into Volcano Entertainment that same year. A 7" vinyl single for "Backworlds" was also released, backed with "The Hotel Family Affair." The video for "Backworlds" got good reception on MTV. It premiered on 120 Minutes in September 1997, and was also the first video placed into heavy rotation on the channel after it received the most votes in four episodes of the short-lived video-rating series 12 Angry Viewers.

== Recording and musical style ==
In addition to having "prog-rock roots", Free Mars also contained a strong influence from British music. Chris Pitman said in 1997 "[we have] definite love for crafty songwriting via The Beatles and The Kinks and bands like that. But please, don't lump them in with Oasis. We didn't know about any 'Britpop' stuff."

Pitman attributed the album's psychedelic 60s pop sound to the band's recording environment. He stated "We were just going to do an experimental record. But we got this rehearsal space where Fleetwood Mac and The Beach Boys and all these people used to rehearse. It's kept the same way it was back then, and it's really nostalgic. I think that rubbed off into what we were doing."

== Reception ==
AllMusic's Steve Bekkala wrote in his review "Blending lo-fi dime store psychedelia with layered shoegazing soundscapes, Free Mars stakes out the murky sonic turf located somewhere in the midst of My Bloody Valentine, Olivia Tremor Control, and Spiritualized." He concluded by stating that "the album is mostly an assured, solid collection of songs." Free Mars would go on to get a Grammy award nomination for Best Recording Package, but lost out to Titanic: Music as Heard on the Fateful Voyage.

Paul D'Amour claimed in a May 1997 MTV interview that "Lusk is probably the first thing I've ever done that I'm truly pleased with."

In August 1998, The Lantern named it as one of the "top unheard records of '97".

== Track listing ==
1. "Backworlds" – 4:49
2. "Savvy Kangaroos" – 3:19
3. "Gold" – 3:50
4. "Free Mars" – 5:58
5. "Doctor" – 6:08
6. "Mindray" – 4:18
7. "The Hotel Family Affair" – 4:28
8. "Black Sea Me" – 4:12
9. "Undergarden" – 4:21
10. "Kill the King" – 5:31
11. "My Good Fishwife" – 5:46 / "Blair's Spiders" (hidden track after 10:49) – 19:19
- The case and booklet list "The Hotel Family Affair" and "Black Sea Me" together as one track, but they are separate tracks on the disc itself.

== Personnel ==
- Chris Pitman – vocals, piano, chamberlin, harpsichord, organ, mellotron, guitar, bass, synthesizers
- Paul D'Amour – vocals, guitar, bass, synthesizers, percussion, bells and shakers
- Greg Edwards – vocals, guitar, bass, drums, synthesizers
- Brad Laner – vocals, guitar, bass, drums, synthesizers, noise, treatments

=== Additional personnel ===
- Dana Woolard – cello
- Gilden Tunador – backing vocals
- Korel Tunador – horns
- Joe Russo – cello
- Patti Hood – harp, concert harp, laughter
- Kellii Scott – drums
- Danny Carey – percussion
- Blair Blake
