= All We Know (disambiguation) =

"All We Know" is a 2016 song by The Chainsmokers.

All We Know may also refer to:

- "All We Know" (Paramore song), 2005
- "All We Know", a song by Close to Home from Never Back Down

== See also ==
- All We Know Is Falling, Paramore studio album
- For All We Know (disambiguation)
