= Tree of Stars =

EP by Failure
- Released: May 14, 2014
- Recorded: 2014
- Genre: Alternative rock, space rock
- Length: 23:13
- Producer: Failure

Failure chronology
Essentials (2006)	Tree of Stars (2014)	The Heart Is a Monster (2015)

Singles from Come Crashing
- 1. "Come Crashing" Released: May 14, 2014

Tree of Stars is a self-released EP by the alternative rock band Failure. It was produced by the band and mixed and mastered by Ken Andrews. The EP includes four live recordings (taken from the current reunion shows) and a new song, "Come Crashing", the first studio track since the 1996 album, Fantastic Planet. "Come Crashing" would later appear as the twelfth song on their 2015 comeback studio album The Heart Is a Monster.

== Background ==
The EP was first announced on May 10, 2014, via Facebook. On May 14, "Come Crashing" was made available for purchase on bandcamp. Physical copies of the CD are exclusive to the "Tree of Stars" North American tour, which began on May 10 (Los Angeles, CA - The Greek Theatre) and ended on June 19 (Los Angeles, CA The Mayan).

== Track listing ==
All songs written by Ken Andrews and Greg Edwards

Tracks 1 and 2 are taken from the album Magnified – tracks 3 and 4 are from Fantastic Planet.

Tree of Stars Tour Release

No.	Title	Writer(s)	Length
1.	"Let It Drip" (Live in Phoenix, AZ)		3:11
2.	"Frogs" (Live in Houston, TX)		4:52
3.	"Sergeant Politeness" (Live in Houston, TX)		4:19
4.	"Heliotropic" (Live in Phoenix, AZ)		6:34
5.	"Come Crashing"	Andrews, Edwards, Scott	4:20
Total length:			23:13

2022 Reissue

No.	Title	Length
1.	"Let It Drip" (Live in Phoenix, AZ)	3:11
2.	"Frogs" (Live in Houston, TX)	4:52
3.	"Sergeant Politeness" (Live in Houston, TX)	4:19
4.	"Heliotropic" (Live in Phoenix, AZ)	6:34
5.	"Solaris" (2014 Recording)	6:03
Total length:		24:56

== Personnel ==
Failure

- Ken Andrews – vocals, guitar, bass
- Greg Edwards – bass, guitar. keyboards
- Kellii Scott – drums
