= Lusk (band) =

Experimental 1990s US rock band

- Origin: California, United States
- Genres: Psychedelic rock; psychedelic pop; experimental rock; shoegazing
- Years active: 1995–1998
- Labels: Zoo / Volcano
- Past members: Paul D'Amour; Chris Pitman; Greg Edwards; Brad Laner; Chris Wyse

Lusk was an American psychedelic rock supergroup featuring members from Tool, Replicants, Failure and Medicine.

== History ==
The band formed when bassist Paul D'Amour, having recently departed from Tool, and keyboardist Chris Pitman got together. Greg Edwards and Brad Laner joined them shortly afterward. Their only album Free Mars was released in 1997 on Volcano Entertainment. Though the album was not extremely successful, it was nominated for a Grammy Award in 1998 for Best Recording Package. The music video for "Backworlds", co-directed by D'Amour and Len E. Burge III, was featured on MTV's 120 Minutes and 12 Angry Viewers.

Legal troubles with their label Volcano Entertainment which was undergoing a transformation coupled with increasing activities apart from the group by all members caused Lusk to quietly disband in the late 1990s.

== Members ==
- Paul D'Amour – guitar, vocals, effects
- Chris Pitman – piano, keyboards, harpsichord, vibraphone, vocals, effects
- Danny Carey - membranophone
- Greg Edwards – bass, synthesizer, guitar, vocals
- Brad Laner – drums, guitar, vocals, effects
- Chris Wyse - Bass (touring only)

== Discography ==
Albums

- Free Mars (1997, Volcano)

Singles

- "Backworlds" (1997, Volcano)
