= Blinker the Star =

Canadian musician

- Origin: Pembroke, Ontario, Canada
- Genres: Indie rock, Blues, Pop
- Years active: 1992-present
- Labels: Treat & Release; A&M; DreamWorks, Vibra Cobra
- Members: Jordon Zadorozny

Blinker the Star is the recording and performance name of Jordon Zadorozny, a Canadian solo artist who has worked with various musicians to create eleven albums. Notable musicians who have appeared on Blinker the Star albums include Leland Sklar, Ken Andrews, and one of Jordon's childhood heroes, Lindsey Buckingham.

== History ==
Zadorozny launched his musical career with a solo album created in his Pembroke basement. Aside from two songs featuring Reg Wick (a pseudonym for Doug Hempstead, who became a journalist and head of his own music project, Area Resident) on drums and Phil (last name unlisted) on bass (or "bace," as the credits spell it), and a guitar intro by Randy Pederson on one of those songs, he played all of the instruments and used elementary and improvised production techniques to create the self-titled album, which was released in 1993.

Zadorozny moved to Montreal and on the strength of favourable reviews from the debut album, which featured complex, hard guitar-pounding riffs mixed with softer, melancholy tracks, was signed to A&M Records. In 1996, with drummer Colin Wylie, bass player Peder Jakobsen, and Guns N' Roses keyboardist Chris Pitman, Blinker the Star recorded the album A Bourgeois Kitten.

In 1997, Zadorozny moved to Los Angeles, where he was tapped by Courtney Love, and her band Hole, to help with their 1998 album Celebrity Skin. Zadorozny contributed to the song Reasons to Be Beautiful.

In Los Angeles, Blinker signed with DreamWorks Records and released the album August Everywhere in 1999. Singles from the album, particularly "Below the Sliding Doors", enjoyed considerable airplay on Canadian radio stations such as 102.1 The Edge; the album was number 89 on The Edge's top 102 albums of 1999.

After being dropped from DreamWorks, Blinker re-emerged in 2003 with the album Still in Rome, then, in the spring of 2012, We Draw Lines. Blinker drew in several musicians for 2013's Songs From Laniakea Beach, then went solo again with 11235 (2015) and 8 of Hearts (2017). That was followed by Careful With Your Magic (2019), Juvenile Universe (2020) and another solo album, Arista (2021).

Zadorozny has put together live bands to open for Sam Roberts and Sloan. His band played Toronto's Horseshoe Tavern with Wide Mouth Mason, The Pursuit of Happiness, The Killjoys and Local Rabbits during Canadian Music Week, and has played Edenfest and the North by Northeast festival. He last appeared at the Horseshoe Tavern in 2019.

In November 2021, Buckingham gave Zadorozny and Brad Laner retroactive song-writing credit after it was found that he accidentally plagiarized their song "Swan Song".

== Discography ==
- Blinker the Star (Treat & Release 1993, Vibra Cobra Records 1995), with Reg Wick.
- A Bourgeois Kitten (A&M Records 1996), with Colin Wylie, Peder Jakobsen Chris Pitman Kelli Scott Ken Andrews and Greg Edwards
- August Everywhere (DreamWorks Records 1999), with Brad Laner, Greg Wells, Leland Sklar, Kellii Scott, Ken Andrews, Pete Frolander, Justin Meldal-Johnsen, Charlie Bisharat, Vinnie Colaiuta, Joel Derouin, John Parish and Chris Pitman.
- Still in Rome (Maple Nationwide Records 2003), with Kellii Scott.
- We Draw Lines (Nile River Records 2012), with Brad Laner, Sofia Silva and Gilden Tunador.
- Songs From Laniakea Beach (Nile River Records 2013), with Kellii Scott, Sofia Silva, Tony Rabalao, Stella Panacci, Matt Mahaffey, Lindsey Buckingham and Brad Laner.
- 11235 (Independent, 2015), solo
- 8 of Hearts (Independent, 2017), solo
- Careful With Your Magic (Nile River Records 2019), with Bob Wilcox and Stella Panacci
- Juvenile Universe (2020), with Bob Wilcox, Filippo Gaetani, Ken Stringfellow, Paul D'Amour, Jarek Leskiewicz, Chris Church, Lexi Stern, John Fields, Gregory Macdonald, Joni Fuller, and Stella Panacci.
- Arista (2021), solo
- Love Oblast (2022)
- Animal Math (2023)
- Occult Classic (2024)

== See also ==
- Canadian rock
- List of Canadian musicians
- List of bands from Canada
- Category:Canadian musical groups
