= All We Know Is Falling =

Studio album by Paramore
- Released: July 26, 2005
- Recorded: 2004–2005
- Studios: Wisner Productions, St. Cloud, Florida; ARS Studios, Orlando, Florida; Bigger Dog Studio, Franklin, Tennessee; Stone Gables Studio, Brentwood, Tennessee; The Skyview Church of Tone and Soul, East Nashville, Tennessee
- Genres: Pop-punk; emo; alternative rock; pop rock
- Length: 35:51
- Label: Fueled by Ramen
- Producers: James Paul Wisner; Mike Green; Roger Alan Nichols; Nick Trevisick

Paramore chronology
All We Know Is Falling (2005)	The Summer Tic EP (2006)

Singles from All We Know Is Falling
- 1. "Pressure" Released: August 2, 2005 (Note: In the UK, "Pressure" was released as the second single on October 30, 2006.); 2. "Emergency" Released: October 21, 2005 (Note: In the UK, "Emergency" was released as the lead single on August 21, 2006.); 3. "All We Know" Released: December 16, 2006 (Note: "All We Know" was released on iTunes in 2006.)

All We Know Is Falling is the debut studio album by the American rock band Paramore, released on July 26, 2005, under the Atlantic-distributed Fueled by Ramen in the United States. Its production was handled by James Paul Wisner, Mike Green, Nick Trevisick, and Roger Alan Nichols. The departure of bassist Jeremy Davis, which occurred a few days after arriving in Orlando, served as the album's main theme. This theme was reflected especially in the album's cover and title. Mostly categorized as a pop-punk album, the album received mostly positive reviews and has been labeled a "scene classic".

The album's production took place in Orlando, Florida. Instead of making a major push towards radio, the band's A&R recommended that the band build a fanbase through word of mouth. Initially, the album received positive reviews by music critics, praising the vocals of lead singer Hayley Williams; retrospective assessments have been more mixed. The album had a weak domestic commercial performance: it failed to enter the Billboard 200, though it did reach number 30 on Billboard's Heatseekers Chart. It reached No. 4 on the UK Rock Chart, and in 2010 it managed to reach No. 51 on the UK Albums Chart and earned a gold certification by the British Phonographic Industry (BPI). In July 2014, after the group found success with its following records, All We Know Is Falling received a gold certification from the Recording Industry Association of America (RIAA). Three singles from the album were released: "Pressure", "Emergency" and "All We Know". None of the singles managed to reach any major chart, although "Pressure" was certified gold by the RIAA in 2016 after the band found commercial success with subsequent releases.

== Background ==
Hayley Williams was originally signed to Atlantic Records in 2003 as a solo pop singer. However, Williams ultimately decided not to pursue a solo career, saying she did not envision herself as "the next Madonna". Instead, she recruited three friends, Josh Farro, Zac Farro, and Jeremy Davis, to form Paramore and convinced Atlantic to let them keep her contract if they could record some satisfactory demos. In her short solo career, Williams had already recorded some of her own demos, which were then re-recorded with the band for a "more authentic" sound. However, the band was almost fired because the label thought the finished demos "were terrible." Williams and Farro quickly wrote two new radio-friendly songs, "Here We Go Again" and "Hallelujah" in a compromise to save the album. The former song became the fifth track on All We Know Is Falling, while "Hallelujah" was saved for their sophomore album Riot! (2007).

== Production ==
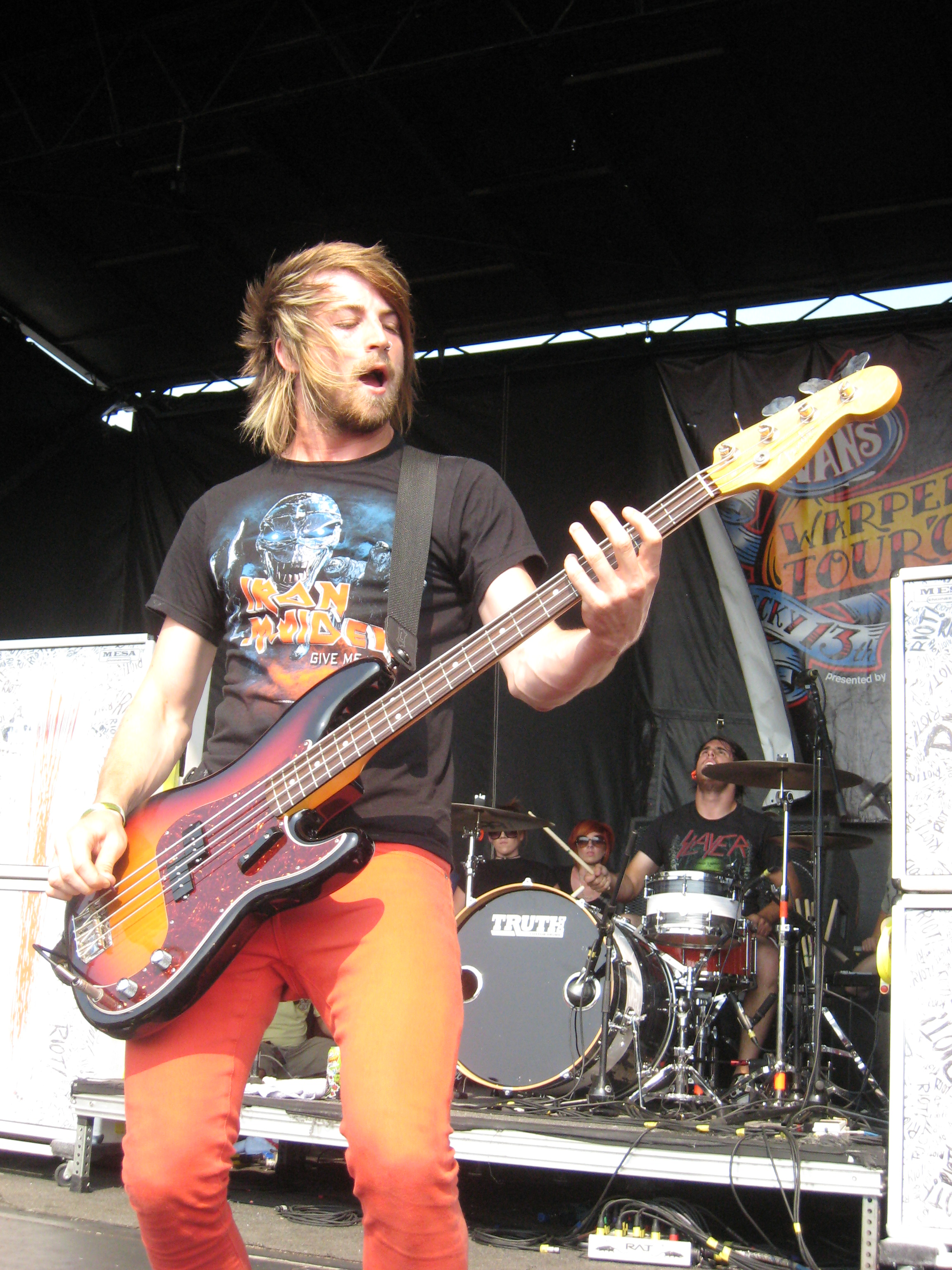
The departure of bassist Jeremy Davis served as one of the themes for the album.

The group traveled to Orlando, Florida, to write and record the remainder of the album. A few days after arriving in Orlando, Davis unexpectedly left the band. Williams and the Farros decided to continue on as a three-member lineup. They also decided to build the album's theme around their feelings toward Davis' departure. According to Williams, the album's cover art also represented Davis' departure: "The couch with no one there and the shadow walking away; it's all about Jeremy leaving us and us feeling like there's an empty space." The album's artwork was created by Electric Heat.

The album's recording process took about three weeks, with Josh Farro calling the sessions "rushed". "All We Know", "Never Let This Go" and "My Heart" were recorded with producer James Paul Wisner at Wisner Productions, located in St. Cloud, Florida. "Pressure", "Emergency", "Brighter", "Whoa", "Conspiracy" and "Franklin" were recorded with producer Mike Green at ARS Studios, located in Orlando, Florida. "Here We Go Again" was recorded with producers Roger Alan Nichols and Nick Trevisick at Bigger Dog Studio, located in Franklin, Tennessee. Additional recording took place at Stone Gables Studio, located in Brentwood, Tennessee and at The Skyview Church of Tone and Soul, located in East Nashville, Tennessee.

All of the songs were mixed by Green, except for "Here We Go Again", which was mixed by Nichols and Trevisick. Tom Baker mastered the recordings at Precision Mastering in Hollywood, California. Nath Warshowsky acted as the studio drum tech for every song, except for "Here We Go Again". Dave Buchman engineered "Here We Go Again". Lucio Rubino, then frontman of StorySide:B, replaced the absent Davis in the studio. He performed bass on every song except for "Here We Go Again", which was done by Jeremy Davis.

Typically, Farro would write the music while Williams wrote the lyrics. On occasion, Farro would contribute lyrics as well. "Conspiracy" was composed by Williams, Farro, and Taylor York. It was the first song they wrote together. Many of the lyrics in All We Know Is Falling which are not related to Davis' departure deal with the tumultuous relationship and divorce of Williams' parents. "Brighter" was a tribute to Williams' friend Lanie Kealhofer, who died on May 22, 2005 at the age of 16 in a boating accident.

== Composition ==
Critics have variously called All We Know Is Falling a pop-punk, emo, pop rock, and alternative rock album. Trevor Kelley at Alternative Press categorized the album as "vaguely emo, but mostly mall-punk". Tom Whitson of Click Music defined the album as emo with "pop-punk beats", drawing comparisons from Avril Lavigne and Fall Out Boy. The AllMusic review by Neil Z. Yeung referred to the album as a "formulaic" pop punk album, complete with "head-bobbing drums, straightforward riffs, and a midtempo sameness throughout". In a retrospective Alternative Press review by Tyler Sharp, the album was referred to as what would have been "just another pop-rock effort that ultimately fell short in the face of its true potential" if not for the band's later success. Gigwise reviewer David Renshaw also drew comparisons to Lavigne, but believed that the songs on the album were inferior to those of Lavigne's.

== Release and promotion ==
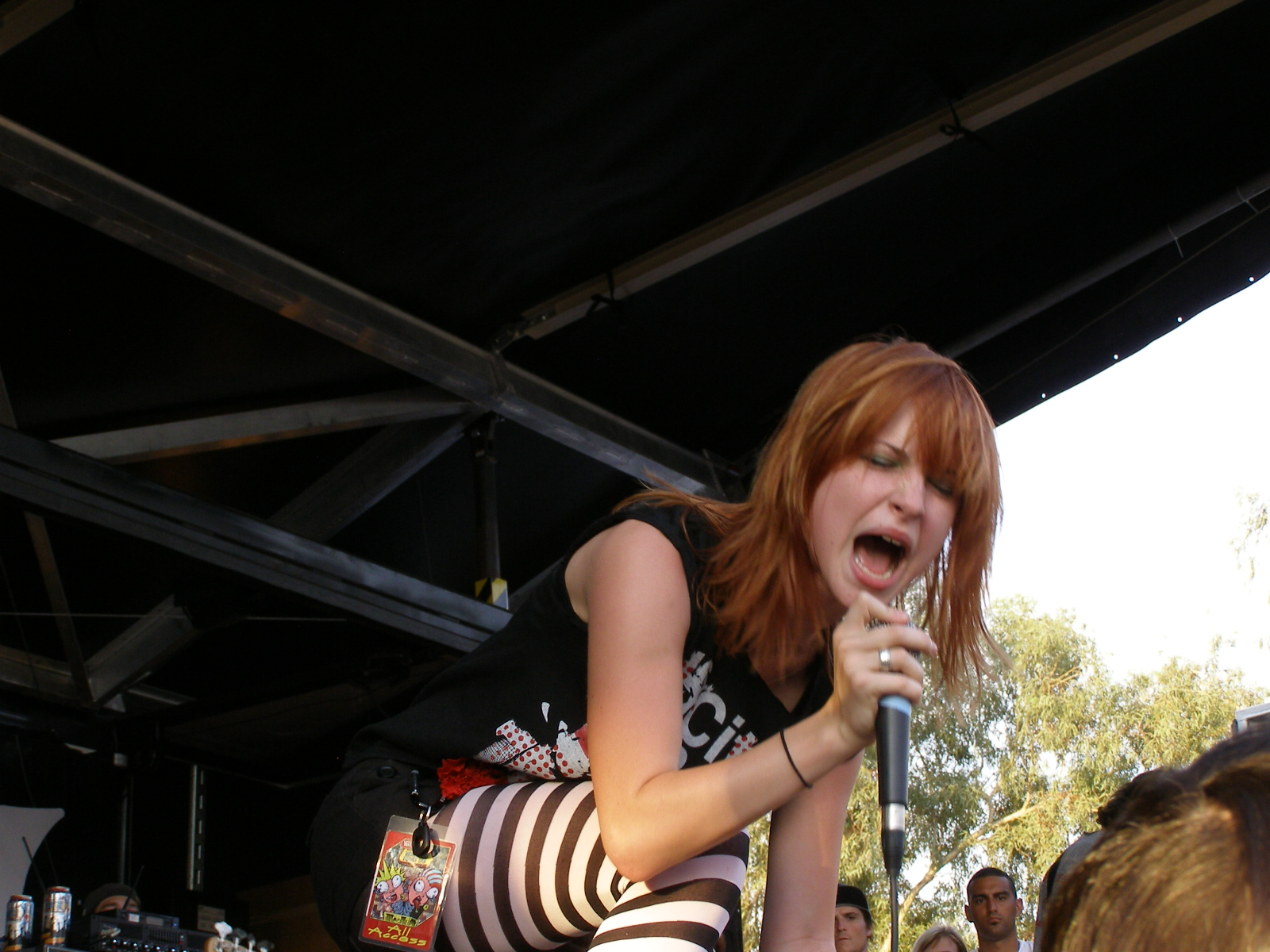
Hayley Williams performing on July 4, 2006, in Phoenix, Arizona, as part of the 2006 edition of Warped Tour

Paramore released All We Know Is Falling on July 26, 2005, in the United States. According to Paramore's A&R at Atlantic Records, Steve Robertson, the promotion strategy behind the album was that the band would start small and slowly build through word of mouth instead of giving the debut album a major radio promotional push. In his own words, Robertson "wanted kids to discover the band without it being shoved down their throats." In September 2005, a special Japanese edition containing a previously unreleased song "Oh Star" was made available. In January 2009, the album was released on vinyl for the first time. On May 19, 2009, a deluxe edition of the album was released exclusively on iTunes with live versions of "Pressure" and "Here We Go Again", and the music videos for all the singles. A 10th anniversary edition of the album was released on December 4, 2015, on vinyl, which contains "O Star" and "This Circle" as bonus tracks; this version was limited to 4,000 copies. The album featured three singles: "Pressure", "Emergency" and "All We Know". On July 25, 2025, Paramore surprise-released the 20th anniversary edition of the album without any prior announcement. The reissue included the first streaming appearance of The Summer Tic EP in full, including "O' Star", "This Circle", the "Crab Mix" of "Emergency", and a cover of Failure's "Stuck on You" as bonus tracks on the album.

Two weeks before starting a tour to promote the album, John Hembree joined the band to replace bassist Jeremy Davis, though Davis ended up rejoining the group after five months away from the band. In October and November, the group supported Simple Plan on their headlining tour in the United States, followed by a supporting slot for Funeral for a Friend in December. In February 2006, the group went on Midwest and east coast tour with Halifax, My American Heart, and So They Say. Through the spring of 2006, Paramore was an opening act on tours for both Bayside and The Rocket Summer. The band was initially planned to appear on the 2006 edition of the Take Action Tour in early March 2006, but Williams came down with flu, which resulted in the band being replaced by Sullivan. The band went on the 2006 edition of the Warped Tour, which took place in Nashville, near the group's hometown. In August and September, the band headlined a tour in the US with support from Hit the Lights, Cute Is What We Aim For and This Providence, followed by some dates in the United Kingdom in October.

== Critical reception ==
Professional ratings
Review scores
Source	Rating
AllMusic	3.5/5 stars
Alternative Press	4/5 stars
Click Music	4.5/5 stars
Gigwise	5/10
Punknews.org	1/5 stars
The Trades	A−

All We Know Is Falling was met with generally positive reviews from music critics. Kelley stated "it's obvious that someone has done Williams wrong" from the lyrics in the album's songs, and noted its similarity to Lavigne's previous studio album Under My Skin (2004). Tony Pascarella of The Trades said that "these passionate, rocking tracks are what make this Tennessee group so talented [...] Paramore is a band you may not yet have heard of, but look for them to make a major splash in the very near future." He also praised Williams' voice as "a rich, powerful voice that rarely makes a mistake on this stunning debut." In a tenth-anniversary review from Alternative Press, Tyler Sharp wrote that the album evolved into "a scene classic" after the band's gradual rise to mainstream popularity in later years.

However, the album is often held in a negative light compared to the band's subsequent studio albums, and retrospective reviews have been mixed. In a retrospective review, Yeung showed mixed feelings about the album. He regarded the album as "alright"; however, he believed that the songs were too straightforward and lacked "differentiation, excitement, or the brightness that would be found on later albums." Whitson said that the album was "this group of youngsters have written a great debut album for their age [...] [All We Know Is Falling] isn't the best album around, but is far from the worst." Renshaw was critical about the fact that "Paramore are for the kids who think Pink is not cool enough but My Chemical Romance are too scary, they want to rebel but they have to be in by 9 o' clock. Paramore are not terrible; they are simply a transitional band." Jordan "Anchors" Rogowski from Punknews.org was more critical of the album; he praised Williams' voice, but criticized the structures of the songs, regarding them "just too flat, too linear [...] the guitar seems a bit uninspired, the drumming a bit lazy, and the bass is barely existent, if existent at all."

== Commercial performance ==
Initially, All We Know Is Falling only charted on the Billboard Heatseekers Albums chart, peaking at number 30 in September 2006. After the success of their second studio album Riot! (2007), the album sales gradually built. Although it never charted on the Billboard 200, it did manage to take number eight on the Billboard Catalog Albums chart in 2009. All We Know Is Falling only reached number 51 on the UK Albums Chart, but still received gold certification in 2009 by the British Phonographic Industry for shipping over 100,000 copies. It was then certified in Australia in 2012, where it went gold for shipments of over 35,000 units despite never reaching an Australian chart. In 2014, the album was certified gold in the United States for shipments of over 500,000 copies. Initially, none of the singles managed to chart, but after the success of Riot!, "Pressure" was able to peak at number 62 on the Billboard Digital Songs chart. In 2016, the recording was certified gold by the Recording Industry Association of America (RIAA).

== Track listing ==
All tracks are written by Hayley Williams and Josh Farro, except where noted.

All We Know Is Falling track listing
No.	Title	Writer(s)	Length
1.	"All We Know"		3:14
2.	"Pressure"		3:06
3.	"Emergency"		4:00
4.	"Brighter"		3:43
5.	"Here We Go Again"		3:46
6.	"Never Let This Go"		3:40
7.	"Whoa"		3:20
8.	"Conspiracy"	Hayley Williams; Josh Farro; Taylor York	3:42
9.	"Franklin"		3:20
10.	"My Heart"		4:00
Total length:			35:51

Japanese edition
No.	Title	Writer(s)	Length
8.	"Franklin"		3:20
9.	"Conspiracy"	Williams; Farro; York	3:42
10.	"My Heart"		4:00
11.	"O' Star"	Williams; York	3:48
Total length:			39:39

=== Deluxe versions and bonus tracks ===
20th anniversary deluxe edition
No.	Title	Writer(s)	Length
1.	"All We Know"		3:14
2.	"Pressure"		3:06
3.	"Emergency"		4:00
4.	"Brighter"		3:43
5.	"Here We Go Again"		3:46
6.	"Never Let This Go"		3:40
7.	"Whoa"		3:20
8.	"Conspiracy"	Williams; Farro; York	3:42
9.	"Franklin"		3:20
10.	"My Heart"		4:00
11.	"O' Star"	Williams; York	3:45
12.	"Stuck on You" (Failure cover)	Ken Andrews; Greg Edwards	4:30
13.	"This Circle"		4:06
14.	"Emergency (Crab Mix)"		4:02
15.	"Here We Go Again (Live)"		3:23
16.	"Pressure (Live)"		3:02
17.	"My Heart (Live)"		9:00
Total length:			70:00

iTunes deluxe edition extra tracks
No.	Title	Length
11.	"Pressure" (live) (originally released on The Final Riot!)	3:02
12.	"Here We Go Again" (live) (originally released on Riot! FYE Release)	3:24
13.	"Pressure" (music video)	3:06
14.	"Emergency" (music video)	3:58
15.	"All We Know" (music video)	3:13
Total length:		52:34

10th anniversary edition bonus tracks
No.	Title	Writer(s)	Length
11.	"O' Star"	Williams; York	3:48
12.	"This Circle"		4:06
Total length:			43:45

Special/Limited edition MVI
No.	Title	Length
14.	"Pressure" (acoustic; live from Q101 Chicago)	3:01
Total length:		50:31

Best Buy and iTunes UK release
No.	Title	Length
14.	"Emergency" (live)	4:23
Total length:		51:53

FYE release
No.	Title	Length
15.	"Here We Go Again" (live)	3:23
Total length:		55:16

20th Anniversary deluxe edition (streaming version)
No.	Title	Writer(s)	Length
11.	"Emergency (Crab Mix)"		4:02
12.	"O' Star"	Williams; York	3:45
13.	"Stuck on You"	Ken Andrews; Greg Edwards	4:30
14.	"This Circle"		4:06

== Personnel ==
Paramore

- Hayley Williams – lead vocals
- Josh Farro – lead guitar, backing vocals, unclean vocals (10)
- Jason Bynum – rhythm guitar, backing vocals
- Jeremy Davis – bass (5)
- Zac Farro – drums

Additional musicians

- Lucio Rubino – bass (all except 5; 11–14)

Production

- James Paul Wisner – producer and recording (1, 6, 10)
- Mike Green – producer and recording (2–4, 7–9; 11–14); mixing (all except 5; 11–14)
- Roger Alan Nichols and Nick Trevisick – producers, recording and mixing (5)
- Nathan Warshowsky – studio drum technician (all except 5)
- Tom Baker – mastering engineer
- Dave Buchanan – engineer (5)
- John Janich – executive producer
- John Deeb – photography
- Electric Heat – album artwork

== Charts ==
Chart performance for All We Know Is Falling
Chart (2006–2026)	Peak position
Croatian International Albums (HDU)	21
Scottish Albums (OCC)	33
UK Albums (OCC)	51
UK Album Sales (OCC)	52
UK Rock & Metal Albums (OCC)	3
UK Physical Albums (OCC)	48
UK Official Record Stores (OCC)	10
UK Vinyl Albums (OCC)	19
US Heatseekers Albums (Billboard)	30
US Top Catalog Albums (Billboard)	8

== Certifications ==
Certifications for All We Know Is Falling
Region	Certification	Certified units/sales
Australia (ARIA)	Gold	35,000^{^}
United Kingdom (BPI)	Gold	100,000^{^}
United States (RIAA)	Platinum	1,000,000^{‡}
^{^} Shipments figures based on certification alone.^{‡} Sales+streaming figures based on certification alone.

== Release history ==
Release history for All We Know Is Falling
Region	Date	Label	Format	Edition	Ref.
United States	July 26, 2005	Fueled by Ramen	CD; digital download; LP	Standard	
United Kingdom	April 24, 2006	Fueled by Ramen	CD	Standard	
Australia	May 16, 2007	Warner Music Australia	CD	Standard	
United States	May 19, 2009	Fueled by Ramen	Digital download (iTunes)	Deluxe	
Japan	June 24, 2009	Warner Music Japan	CD; digital download; LP	Standard	
United Kingdom	March 6, 2013	Fueled by Ramen	Digital download	Standard	
Australia	March 6, 2013	Warner Music Australia	Digital download	Standard	
United States	December 4, 2015	Fueled by Ramen	LP	10th anniversary	
Worldwide	July 25, 2025	Fueled by Ramen	Streaming release	20th anniversary	
