= The Heart Is a Monster =

Studio album by Failure
- Released: June 30, 2015
- Recorded: 2014–2015 at Red Swan Studio & Oasis Mastering Studio One
- Genres: Alternative rock; space rock
- Length: 62:51
- Labels: INgrooves Music Group, Failure Records LLC
- Producer: Failure

Failure chronology
Tree of Stars (2014)	The Heart Is a Monster (2015)	In the Future Your Body Will Be the Furthest Thing from Your Mind (2018)

Singles from The Heart Is A Monster
- 1. "Come Crashing" Released: May 14, 2014; 2. "The Focus" Released: June 15, 2014; 3. "Hot Traveler" Released: March 29, 2015

Professional ratings
Aggregate scores
Source	Rating
Metacritic	78/100
Review scores
Source	Rating
AllMusic	3.5/5 stars
ThePRP	4/5 stars
Consequence of Sound	4/5 stars
Pitchfork	7.8/10
Rolling Stone	3.5/5 stars
Alternative Nation	9/10
AntiHero Magazine	9/10 stars

The Heart Is a Monster is the fourth studio album by the alternative rock band, Failure. It is the follow-up to and the band's first album since 1996's Fantastic Planet. The album was released on June 30, 2015, via INgrooves Music Group's artist services division, INresidence.

== Production ==
A PledgeMusic campaign was created on January 17, 2015 to fund production of the album. Part of the promotion included the offering of the album Fantastic Planet recorded on vinyl for the second time.

== Reception ==
According to Metacritic, the album holds a score of 78 indicating "generally favorable" reviews. Alternative Nation states that "The Heart is a Monster is a reckoning force that achieves success as a comeback and a glorious landmark in the evolution in alternative and space rock." Pitchfork noted that the album had "that charge of intellectual stimulation—spiked with an ever-so-subtle creep factor—that makes The Heart Is a Monster such a thrilling ride." They also commented on the segue (instrumental) tracks, stating that "a whole separate album in that style would've been nice, but even in truncated form the interludes cast Philip Glass-ian shades onto the other songs and suggest that Failure's creativity is far from exhausted."

Consequence of Sound offered praise for the remade "Petting The Carpet" and the lead single "Hot Traveler", but stated that "...for an album that’s over an hour long, it’s easy to point out what could be trimmed," citing "Mulholland Dr." and "Fair Light Era" as missteps. Rolling Stone gave 3.5 stars in their review, stating that Failure deserves their following, but "what might've been a Nineties nostalgia trip feels more like history made new". Exclaim.ca stated that the album "doesn't quite leave the impression mid-'90s Failure did, but despite less experimental approach and cleaner digital production, it's still a compelling listen."

== Charts ==
The Heart Is a Monster debuted July 18, 2015 on the Billboard 200 album chart at #83 and at #43 on the Top Album Sales chart, which excludes on-demand streaming or individually sold tracks. The album debuted at #11 in Alternative Albums, making it the highest debut of Failure's history. The album reportedly sold 7,250 copies in the U.S. in its first week.

== Other ==
- Two music videos were officially produced:
  - "Hot Traveler", which shows Failure performing in a warehouse inside a camera dolly track.
  - "Counterfeit Sky", which is a video of the song over a cut of the short film "Grounded" by Kevin Margo (Thor: The Dark World).
- "Petting The Carpet" originally appeared on the compilation album "Golden" as an out-take for Comfort. (original length 3:39)
- "Come Crashing" was part of the Tree of Stars EP – the first song written for the album, and the first new Failure track recorded since the Fantastic Planet album sessions.
- "I Can See Houses" was played live in 1991 but was never recorded in the studio; the live version can be seen on the DVD side of Golden.
- An alternate recording of "The Focus" was released as a single during the PledgeMusic campaign (original length 3:18) and later reworked for the album.

== Track listing ==
All tracks are written by Failure.

No.	Title	Length
1.	"Segue 4"	1:07
2.	"Hot Traveler"	4:51
3.	"A.M. Amnesia"	4:50
4.	"Snow Angel"	3:32
5.	"Atom City Queen"	3:57
6.	"Segue 5"	1:21
7.	"Counterfeit Sky"	4:46
8.	"Petting the Carpet"	4:49
9.	"Mulholland Dr."	4:32
10.	"Fair Light Era"	3:08
11.	"Segue 6"	1:14
12.	"Come Crashing"	4:01
13.	"Segue 7"	1:08
14.	"The Focus"	3:35
15.	"Otherwhere"	3:22
16.	"Segue 8"	1:59
17.	"I Can See Houses"	6:33
18.	"Segue 9"	4:07
Total length:		62:51

== Credits ==
=== Personnel ===
- Ken Andrews – lead vocals, guitar, bass, programming
- Greg Edwards – guitar, bass, keyboards, backing vocals
- Kellii Scott – drums, percussion

=== Additional personnel ===
- Troy Van Leeuwen – additional guitar (tracks 4, 9, 12, 14)

=== production ===
- All songs written by K. Andrews and G. Edwards
- Mixing by Ken Andrews
- Mastering by Gene Grimaldi
- Published by Quinine Music (BMI) and Vicus Music (BMI)
- Recorded, mixed, and mastered at Red Swan Studios, Los Angeles, CA, and Oasis Management Studio One, Burbank, CA.
