= Fantastic Planet (Failure album) =

Studio album by Failure
- Released: August 13, 1996
- Studio: F.P.S. Studios, Los Angeles; Madhatter Studios, Silverlake
- Genre: Alternative rock; post-grunge; space rock; art rock
- Length: 67:51
- Label: Slash; Warner Bros.
- Producer: Failure

Failure chronology
Magnified (1994)	Fantastic Planet (1996)	Golden (2004)

Singles from Fantastic Planet
- 1. "Stuck on You" Released: August 1996; 2. "Pitiful" Released: 1996; 3. "Saturday Saviour" Released: 1997

Fantastic Planet is the third album by the American alternative rock band Failure, released on August 13, 1996, by Slash Records and Warner Bros. Records. It was the last album released on Slash Records prior to its acquisition by London Recordings in 1996.

The album was produced by Failure themselves in a process that took longer than their previous two albums, with each song being recorded and produced soon after being written. Space rock themes are present in the lyrics, as well as various indirect references to drug addiction, drug-related experiences, and prostitution. The album is cyclical, in that the chiming sound effect which ends the final track "Daylight" begins the opening track "Saturday Saviour", and was the beginning of a system of numerically designated segues in Failure's studio work, which would continue on later albums.

Despite receiving critical acclaim, the album failed to make an appearance on the Billboard 200 chart, but it did produce a charting single with "Stuck on You", which reached No. 23 on Billboard's Alternative Songs Chart. Seven of the album's songs were also included on Failure's Essentials, a best-of collection from 2006. Fantastic Planet would be Failure's last studio album for nineteen years until the release of The Heart Is a Monster (2015).

== Background ==
In 1992, Failure signed with Slash Records (an LA-based independent label), and subsequently released two albums; Comfort in 1992, and Magnified in 1994. Magnified, while not a commercial success, was a hit with critics and pushed the band to begin work on Fantastic Planet in early 1995. Guitarist Troy Van Leeuwen joined Failure around the time of this album's release.

== Artwork ==
The album art is closely based on an illustration by Ed Valigursky used for the book jacket of the first edition of Scientology founder L. Ron Hubbard's 1954 novel To the Stars.

== Release ==
Towards the end of recording Fantastic Planet, Failure learned that Slash Records was putting itself up for sale, and subsequently would not be able to release the band's album. Subsequently, Fantastic Planet remained shelved for about a year after its completion in February 1995, with the band "unofficially" shopping the album to other labels while hoping that Slash would renew its distribution deal with Warner Bros. Records. Upon hearing Fantastic Planet and liking the album, Warner Bros. agreed to directly sign the band in February 1996, but the album was not released for another six months due to issues around record contract negotiations.

The album's first single, "Stuck on You" (an appropriately catchy mid-tempo track that metaphorically compares infatuation to a nagging tune stuck in one's head), became a minor alternative-radio hit and achieved light to medium rotation on MTV, but failed to chart significantly. The song peaked at No. 31 on the U.S. Billboard Mainstream Rock chart and No. 23 on the Modern Rock chart. Other songs, such as "Saturday Saviour" and "Pitiful", received some airplay from more adventurous-minded DJs, but no more videos were made for any of the album's tracks, and due to the state of disarray at their label at that time, little effort was put into its promotion.

The music video for "Stuck on You" closely resembles the opening credits of the James Bond film The Spy Who Loved Me (included on the DVD portion of the 2004 Failure compilation Golden).

== Reception ==
Professional ratings
Review scores
Source	Rating
AllMusic	2.5/5 stars
Alternative Press	5/5
The Boston Phoenix	3/4 stars
Fort Worth Star-Telegram	4/5 stars
RIP	4/5 stars
Sputnikmusic	4.0/5

Fantastic Planet was met with critical acclaim. In a highly positive contemporaneous review written for The Daily Utah Chronicle in November 1996, Shan Fowler asserts that with the album “Failure separates themselves from the guitar-buzzed masses by balancing thick riffs with intricate arrangements and intelligent lyrics.” Fowler goes on to highlight the album's final two tracks, “Heliotropic” and “Daylight”, as its crowning achievement, writing that the songs are “two manipulated masterpieces with tribal drums, treated guitars, spacey synthesizers and dubbed vocals. It sounds like a mess when broken down, but flows weightlessly and gracefully in and out of the listeners mind.”

== Legacy ==
In 2009, JustPressPlay named Fantastic Planet the third-best album of the 1990s. In 2014, Decibel Magazine inducted Fantastic Planet into their Hall of Fame naming it a cult classic and an album that paints its heaviness in a gorgeous way.

"The Nurse Who Loved Me" was covered by A Perfect Circle on their 2003 album Thirteenth Step, as well as by The Section Quartet on their 2007 album Fuzzbox. "Another Space Song" was covered by Statistics, the solo project of Denver Dalley of Desaparecidos, and released on Location is Everything Vol. 2, a Jade Tree Records sampler disc. "Stuck on You" was covered by Paramore on their 2006 CD The Summer Tic EP; the title of the CD is taken from the song's lyrics, albeit with "tick" changed to "tic". "Smoking Umbrellas" was covered by Phil Ritchie on Rock Star: Supernova, and was also covered by SouthFM. "Sergeant Politeness" was played live at solo concerts between 2004 and 2006 by Melissa Auf der Maur with her band Auf der Maur. A recording of a rendition was released on her single "Taste You".

In 2022 during the first trailer for the upcoming Failure documentary, record producer and musician Butch Vig acclaims Fantastic Planet as one of his top twenty-five albums. He also describes the lead riff in "Stuck on You" as "an SOS being beamed in from another galaxy" that he was "obsessed with."

== Track listing ==
All tracks written by Ken Andrews and Greg Edwards.

1. "Saturday Saviour" – 4:27
2. "Sergeant Politeness" – 4:05
3. "Segue 1" – 1:54
4. "Smoking Umbrellas" – 3:58
5. "Pillowhead" – 2:09
6. "Blank" – 5:38
7. "Segue 2" – 1:17
8. "Dirty Blue Balloons" – 4:23
9. "Solaris" – 3:43
10. "Pitiful" – 4:45
11. "Leo" – 3:05
12. "Segue 3" – 2:11
13. "The Nurse Who Loved Me" – 4:25
14. "Another Space Song" – 5:10
15. "Stuck on You" – 4:28
16. "Heliotropic" – 6:14
17. "Daylight" – 6:00

== Personnel ==
- Ken Andrews – vocals, electric guitar, bass guitar
- Greg Edwards – electric guitar, bass guitar, piano, percussion
- Kellii Scott – drums

Produced by Failure; engineered by Ken Andrews. Recorded at F.P.S. Studios (Los Angeles, CA) and Madhatter Studios (Silverlake, CA). Mastered by Tom Baker at Future Disc (Hollywood, CA).

== Chart position ==
"Stuck On You" had charted on Billboard's Alternative Rock (January 11) and Mainstream Rock charts (January 25) in early 1997. The single left both charts nine weeks after appearing.

=== Singles ===
Year	Song	Chart peak positions		
Year	Song	US	US Alt Rock	US Main Rock
1997	"Stuck on You"	—	23	31
"—" denotes releases that did not chart.
