= The Bewlay Brothers =

Song by David Bowie

from the album Hunky Dory
- Released: 17 December 1971
- Recorded: 30 July 1971
- Studio: Trident, London
- Genre: Folk rock, psychedelic folk
- Length: 5:29
- Label: RCA
- Songwriter: David Bowie
- Producers: Ken Scott, David Bowie

David Bowie "The Bewlay Brothers" (1971)
30 second sample from David Bowie's "The Bewlay Brothers".

"The Bewlay Brothers" is a song written by the English singer-songwriter David Bowie in 1971 for the album Hunky Dory. One of the last tracks to be written and recorded for the LP, the ballad has been described as "probably Bowie's densest and most impenetrable song".

Bowie named his publishing company in the late 1970s Bewlay Bros. Music and used the name as a pseudonym for himself, Iggy Pop and Colin Thurston as producers of Pop's 1977 album Lust for Life.

== Background ==
Bowie himself is said to have told producer Ken Scott that it was a track for the American market, because "the Americans always like to read things into things", even though the lyrics "make absolutely no sense".

== Reception ==
Some commentators have seen references in the song to Bowie's half-brother Terry Burns, who suffered from schizophrenia, while others such as Tom Robinson have discerned a "gay agenda". Bowie himself admitted in 1977 that it was "very much based on myself and my brother" and in 2000 he elaborated that it was "another vaguely anecdotal piece about my feelings about myself and my brother, or my other doppelganger. I was never quite sure what real position Terry had in my life, whether Terry was a real person or whether I was actually referencing another part of me, and I think 'Bewlay Brothers' was really about that."

In 2008 Bowie revealed that "Bewlay" was taken from the tobacconist shop chain, House of Bewlay. This he used as "a cognomen - in place of my own. This wasn't just a song about brotherhood so I didn't want to misrepresent it by using my true name. Having said that, I wouldn't know how to interpret the lyric of this song other than suggesting that there are layers of ghosts within it. It's a palimpsest, then". On another occasion he repeated that he "couldn't imagine what the person who wrote that had on his mind at the time".

The coda features Bowie's voice distorted by varispeeding; NME critics Roy Carr and Charles Shaar Murray likened the effect to Bowie's earlier song "The Laughing Gnome", but "in considerably more sinister guise".

Some of these hinted interpretations showed up in the analysis of a Rolling Stone magazine's Readers' Poll: The 10 Best David Bowie Deep Cuts, in which "Bewlay Brothers" came in at #8 (after such hits as "Panic in Detroit", "Station to Station", and "Teenage Wildlife"). Compiler Andy Greene said,

Virtually no entry in the David Bowie songbook has confused the hardcores quite like "The Bewlay Brothers." It was the final track recorded for Hunky Dory and Bowie said at the time the lyrics were nonsense, but in later years he hinted it was inspired by his schizophrenic half-brother Terry. "I was never quite sure what real position Terry had in my life," he said in 2000, "whether Terry was a real person or whether I was actually referencing another part of me, and I think 'Bewlay Brothers' was really about that." Others have seen clear homosexual overtones in the surreal lyrics, but Bowie's never commented on that. He's also only played it five times, and those were all between 2002 and 2004.

John Mendelsohn of Rolling Stone magazine wrote, "'The Bewlay Brothers' sounds like something that got left off The Man Who Sold because it wasn't loud enough. Musically it's quiet and barren and sinister, lyrically virtually impenetrable — a stream-of-consciousness stream of strange and (seemingly) unrelated imagery — and it closes with several repetitions of a chilling chorus sung in a broad Cockney accent, which, if it's any help, David usually invokes when he's attempting to communicate something about the impossibility of ever completely transcending the mundane circumstances of one's birth."

== Live versions ==
The song was performed live for the first time on BBC Radio 2 in 2002. Introducing the song, Bowie told the crowd, "I don't want to do it unless everyone knows this thing. It was from a long time ago. We've never done it on the stage, in a theatre. It's called 'The Bewlay Brothers'." [The crowd applauds.] "You are a bunch of obscurists, aren't you?" Bowie repeats, "We've only ever, ever, ever done this once on a radio show; we've never done this on stage."

== Other releases and cover versions ==
- The song appeared in the Sound + Vision box set in 1989.
- An alternative mix was released as a bonus track on the Rykodisc CD release of Hunky Dory in 1990.
- It was included in a self-selected compilation of favourite tracks titled ISELECT in 2008.

The song has been covered live by Elbow and Peter Murphy of Bauhaus, as well as being released as a single by John Howard. A version was included on the self-titled album of cover versions released by the band Replicants in 1995.

== Personnel ==
- David Bowie – vocals, acoustic guitar, piano
- Mick Ronson – electric and acoustic guitars, backing vocals
- Trevor Bolder – bass guitar
- Mick Woodmansey – drums
- Rick Wakeman – Mellotron

== Film soundtracks ==
The song appears on the soundtrack of Bitter Lake (2015).
