= Carla Azar =

American musician (born 1972)

- Born: June 15, 1972 (age 54); Huntsville, Alabama, United States
- Genres: Alternative rock, electronic
- Occupation: Musician
- Instrument: Drums
- Label: 30th Century Records
- Member of: Autolux
- Website: www.autolux.net

Carla Azar (June 15, 1972) is an American drummer from Huntsville, Alabama and member of the band Autolux. She is a multi-instrumentalist, and also one of the lead singers in Autolux.

Azar played drums on Jack White's albums Blunderbuss, Lazaretto, Boarding House Reach, and No Name, and also played live on tour with him. From 2009–2011, she collaborated with painter Mark Whalen (also known as Kill Pixie) on art exhibitions, creating music for installation rooms. She had a role in the 2014 film Frank starring Michael Fassbender and Domhnall Gleeson.

== Career ==
The band Autolux formed in 2001 in Los Angeles. She met Eugene Goreshter while writing the score for Accidental Death of an Anarchist, a play by Nobel Prize winner Dario Fo. She met Greg Edwards while he was playing in his previous band, Failure. In August 2000, Autolux made their debut, playing two shows at the Silverlake Lounge. On March 1, 2001, the band released a self-produced EP entitled Demonstration. It contained five songs recorded on an 8 track in their rehearsal space. After impressing record producer T Bone Burnett during a performance, Autolux signed to DMZ, a record label created by Burnett and the Coen Brothers.

In 2002, Azar and Josh Klinghoffer supported Vincent Gallo as his tour band in support of his album When. Besides drums, she played guitar and mellotron on the tour.

Azar played drums on The True False Identity (2005) by Burnett and Curtains (2005) by John Frusciante.

In May 2011, she began recording with Jack White on his first solo album, Blunderbuss. In 2012, she toured with White's touring band, The Peacocks.

In 2014, she co-starred as part of an ensemble cast in the film Frank, directed by Lenny Abrahamson, starring Michael Fassbender as Frank.

== Discography ==
=== With Autolux ===
- Future Perfect (DMZ, 2004)
- Transit Transit (TBD, 2010)
- Pussy's Dead (Columbia/Sony, 2016)

Guest appearances

- 1987 Wendy and Lisa, Wendy and Lisa
- 1989 Fruit at the Bottom, Wendy and Lisa
- 1990 Eroica, Wendy and Lisa
- 1993 Dream Harder, The Waterboys
- 1996 Vagabundo, Draco Rosa
- 2000 Teddy Thompson, Teddy Thompson
- 2001 Fan Dance, Sam Phillips
- 2004 A Boot and a Shoe, Sam Phillips
- 2005 Curtains, John Frusciante
- 2006 The True False Identity, T Bone Burnett
- 2007 A Year in the Wilderness, John Doe
- 2007 War Stories, Unkle
- 2008 More Stories, Unkle
- 2009 A Woman a Man Walked By by PJ Harvey and John Parish (2009)
- 2010 Where Did the Night Fall (Another Night Out), Unkle
- 2011 The Lost Notebooks of Hank Williams
- 2011 The People's Key, Bright Eyes
- 2012 Blunderbuss, Jack White
- 2014 Lazaretto, Jack White
- 2014 Lost on the River: The New Basement Tapes
- 2015 Aquaria, Boots
- 2018 Boarding House Reach, Jack White
- 2018 "TV Show", Glim Spanky
- 2019 Desert Sessions Vol. 11 & 12, The Desert Sessions
- 2019 WHO, The Who
- 2023 the record, boygenius
- 2026 Male Model, Noam Weinstein

Soundtracks

- 2002 Divine Secrets of the Ya-Ya Sisterhood
- 2002 Our Little Corner of the World: Music from Gilmore Girls
- 2003 Crossing Jordan
- 2003 The Soul of a Man
- 2005 Don't Come Knocking
- 2007 Across the Universe
- 2007 I'm Not There
- 2008 21
- 2010 Eat Pray Love
- 2011 Sucker Punch
- 2014 Frank
