= Rafael Saavedra =

Contemporary Mexican author

Rafael "Rafa" Saavedra
- Born: 1967 Valencia, Mexico
- Occupation: Writer
- Genre: Short story, cultural journalism
- Notable works: Crossfader. B-sides, hidden tracks & remixes (2009), Lejos del noise (2003), Buten smileys (1997)

Rafael Saavedra (Tijuana, 1967—17 September 2013) was a Mexican author who contributed to magazines Letras Libres, Generación, Moho, Nexos, Replicante, Pícnic, among other publications and literary spaces, including online publications.

== Literary works ==
=== Books ===
- Dios Me Persigue. Novel, Moho, 2014.
- Border Pop. Cultural journalism, Instituto de Cultura de Baja California, 2012.
- Esto no es una salida. Postcards de ocio y odio. Stories, re-edition in Nitro Press, 2012.
- Crossfader 2.0. B-sides, hidden tracks & remixes (stories, Nortestacion Editorial, 2011.
- Buten smileys. Stories, re-edition in Libros Malaletra, 2011.
- Beyondeados. Book of photos, Clicka Press, 2011.
- Crossfader. B-sides, hidden tracks & remixes. Stories, Atemporia Heterodoxos/Nortestacion Editorial, 2009.
- La gente se droga. Stories, Crunch, 2006.
- Lejos del noise. Stories, Moho, 2003.
- Buten smileys. Stories, Yoremito, 1997.
- Esto no es una salida. Postcards de ocio y odio. Stories, La Espina Dorsal, 1996.

=== Anthologies ===
- Cruzando al otro lado (del milenio): cuento bajacaliforniano de entresiglos. Prologue, selection and comments by Gerardo Gómez Michel. Nortestación Editorial, 2014.
- Fronteras Adentro. Cuento de Baja California (1996–2010). Prologue, selection and notes by Humberto Félix Berumen. Universidad Autónoma de Baja California, 2012.
- Tijuana Dreaming. Life and Art at the Global Border. Edited by Josh Kun and Fiamma Montezemolo. Duke University Press, 2012.
- Tijuana en 120 palabras. Libros Malaletra / Nortestación, 2012.
- Dulces batallas que nos animan la noche. Antología del Encuentro Nacional de Letras Independientes 2006–2011. Editores: Alejandra Quintero, Francisco Valenzuela and Oscar Quevedo. Morelia, 2012.
- Lados B. Narrativa de alto riesgo. Hombres. Nitro Press, 2011.
- Nos vemos a la salida. Cuentos de jóvenes escritores para jóvenes lectores. Editor: Maira Colín. Colección Literatura Juvenil in Selector, 2011.
- Sólo Cuento. Año 1 Tomo 1. Antología de cuento latinoamericano. Rosa Beltrán: prologue; Alberto Arriaga, selection and notes, Dirección de Literatura, UNAM, 2009.
- La cresta en movimiento. Antología de contracultura en México. Generación Publicaciones Periodísticas, 2009.
- Sin límites imaginarios. Antología de cuentos del norte de México. Prologue, selection and notes by Miguel G. Rodríguez Lozano. UNAM, 2006.
- José Agustín. Diez años por la contracultura. Memorias del IV Congreso de Contracultura. Generación Publicaciones Periodísticas, 2006.
- Los mejores cuentos mexicanos. Short story, Planeta/Joaquín Mortiz, 2006.
- Memoria del Primer Congreso de Contracultura. Generación Publicaciones Periodísticas, 2004.
- El margen reversible. Narrative. IMAC, Tijuana, 2003.
- La ciudad escrita. Antología de cuentos urbanos con humor e ironía. Selection and preliminary study by Lauro Zavala. Colección Minimalia in Ediciones del Ermitaño, 2000.

== Awards ==
In 2010, his book Border Pop won the Baja California State Literature Prize (Premio Estatal de Literatura de Baja California) under the category of cultural journalism.

== Publications ==
Rafa Saavedra was editor for various fanzines and independent magazines. His first fanzine, Psychocandy appeared in 1985; then, in 1991, DJ Tolo joined him to edit El Centro de la Rabia, which offered texts that proposed ideas for another generation. A few years later, in 1993, Velocet came out, espousing the motto "Agitación y revival" (agitation and revival), and was focussed on electronic music, alternative culture and new narratives. In 2005, he and Sergio Brown edited Radiante, a publication dealing with media, culture and society. His literary and journalistic texts have appeared in magazines (Generación, Moho, Nexos, Letras Libres, Replicante, Picnic, Viceversa, Quo, Complot Internacional, Zona de Obras), supplements (Laberinto, El Ángel del Diario Reforma, among others) and many online spaces.

== Music, radio and DJ ==
He produced the alternative radio programs Sintonía Pop from 1987 to 1991, Selector de Frequencies from 2001 to 2011 and then from 2011 on La Zona Fantasma, which specialized in post-punk music, international indie-pop, weird new wave, Spanish pop, italo-disco, twee-pop, early punk and electro-pop.

As a DJ, he was known as Dj Rafa Dro. He has performed as the opening act for bands such as Aviador Dro, Stereo Total, Ana D, Adanowksy, Casiotone for the Painfully alone, Pigmy, The Whitest Boy Alive, among others. He also maintained a nonmusical project called Arnik Family based on samples and loops.

He is the author of the phrase "Tijuana Makes Me Happy," which was made famous through its use as a song title by Fussible from the Nortec Collective.
