= Paul D'Amour =

American musician

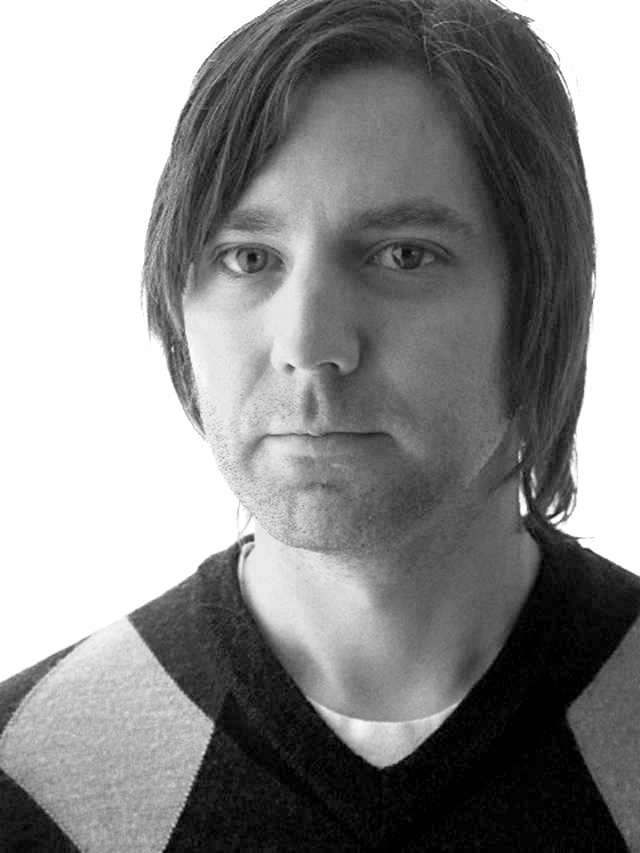
- D'Amour in 2006

Background information
- Born: Paul D'Amour; May 12, 1967 (age 59); Spokane, Washington, U.S.
- Origin: Los Angeles, California, U.S.
- Genres: Progressive metal; alternative rock; industrial metal; hard rock; alternative metal; experimental rock
- Instruments: Bass; vocals; guitar
- Years active: 1985–1987; 1990–present
- Member of: Ministry; Lesser Key
- Formerly of: Lusk; Replicants; Tool
- Website: pauldamour.com

Paul D'Amour (born May 12, 1967) is an American musician who was the original bassist for Tool. His bass sound is recognized by the aggressive picked tone he developed with his Chris Squire Signature Rickenbacker 4001CS, which can be heard on Tool's first full-length album, Undertow. Since March 2019, he has been the bassist for industrial metal band Ministry.

== Biography ==
D'Amour was born in Spokane, Washington. Originally a guitarist, D'Amour became Tool's bassist after being introduced to the band by Adam Jones. Like Jones, D'Amour was in Los Angeles because of his wish to enter the film industry. D'Amour built movie sets and worked in an art department on music videos and commercials.

D'Amour notably appeared on Tool's debut release, Opiate, in 1992 and also Undertow the following year. The band achieved mainstream success due to Undertow, fueled by the charting singles "Sober" and "Prison Sex". In late 1995, D'Amour left Tool during the early recording stages of the Ænima album. He was ultimately credited as a co-writer on five songs. According to drummer Danny Carey, D'Amour left the band because he wanted to play guitar rather than bass. D'Amour corroborated this in 2020 saying, "I always wanted to do other things, and it felt like I was too much in a box with that band ... I'm not just a bass player; I'm a creator, I wanted to have a bigger role, and it just wasn't happening in that situation."

After his departure from Tool, he formed the psychedelic pop band Lusk with Brad Laner, Chris Pitman (future member of Guns N' Roses), and Greg Edwards of Failure and Autolux. In 1997, they released their only album, entitled Free Mars. In addition, D'Amour played guitar in a group named Replicants, a cover band that included Ken Andrews and Greg Edwards from Failure, as well as Chris Pitman. They released one self-titled album in 1995, with a guest appearance from former Tool bandmate Maynard James Keenan.

In early 2005, D'Amour wrote and performed under the name Feersum Ennjin. The name is inspired by the science fiction novel Feersum Endjinn by Iain Banks, an author whose novel The Wasp Factory was conceptual inspiration for Lusk as well. The project released a self-titled EP on Silent Uproar Records. In 2011, a self-titled LP was released on Dissociated Press, featuring some songs that had been released previously and some new ones. On the first track of the LP, "The Fourth", former Tool band-mate Danny Carey plays drums.

D'Amour also played bass in the band Lesser Key. The group consists of Andrew Zamudio (vocals), Brett Fanger (guitar), and Justin Hanson (drums). The band "represents an exploration into personal and artistic freedom." On July 26, 2013, the band released a video of their debut single "Intercession." Their debut EP was produced by former Tool producer Sylvia Massy and released on April 1, 2014 on Sumerian Records.

As of late March 2019, D'Amour joined Ministry as the band's newest bass player, replacing Tony Campos.

== Selected discography ==
With Tool

- Opiate (1992)
- Undertow (1993)

With Replicants

- Replicants (1995)

With Lusk

- Free Mars (1997)

With Feersum Ennjin

- Feersum Ennjin (EP) (2005)
- Feersum Ennjin (2011)

With Lesser Key

- Lesser Key (2014)

With Ministry

- Moral Hygiene (2021)
- Hopiumforthemasses (2024)
- The Squirrely Years Revisited (2025)
- Hate to Go – Take Out or Delivery (2026)
