= The Summer Tic EP =

The Summer Tic

EP by Paramore
- Released: June 18, 2006
- Studio: The Fort Studios (Winter Springs, Florida)
- Length: 16:22
- Label: Self-released
- Producers: Mike Green; Pete Thornton; Nick Trevisick; Roger Alan Nichols

Paramore chronology
All We Know Is Falling (2005)	The Summer Tic (2006)	Riot! (2007)

The Summer Tic is the first EP by the American rock band Paramore. It was released on June 18, 2006, and was sold during the 2006 Warped Tour and the tour supporting their previously released album, All We Know Is Falling. Copies were also sold on the Fueled by Ramen store for a limited time. The name of the EP comes from a lyric of the song "Stuck on You", which is a cover of the Failure song. The EP includes an alternative version of "Emergency", a song which appeared on their debut studio album. The version features the original screaming done by former guitarist, Josh Farro, which was removed for All We Know Is Falling.

All four songs on the EP were re-released as part of the 20th anniversary edition of All We Know Is Falling on July 25, 2025.

== Track listing ==
All tracks are written by Hayley Williams and Josh Farro, except where noted.

No.	Title	Writer(s)	Length
1.	"Emergency" (Crab Mix)		4:03
2.	"O Star"	Williams; Taylor York	3:47
3.	"Stuck on You" (Failure cover)	Ken Andrews; Greg Edwards	4:27
4.	"This Circle"		4:05
Total length:			16:22

== Personnel ==
Paramore

- Hayley Williams – vocals, keyboards
- Josh Farro – guitar, backing vocals
- Jeremy Davis – bass
- Zac Farro – drums

Additional

- Pete Thornton – production (track 3); mixing (tracks 1, 3, 4); additional production (track 1)
- Mike Green – production, recording (track 1, 2); mixing (track 1)
- Ted Jensen – mastering
- Brett Reighn – additional engineering, additional programming (track 3)
- James Rowand Jr. – additional engineering, additional programming (track 3)
