= Edenfest =

1996 music festival in Bowmanville, Ontario, Canada

Eden Musicfest
- Genre: Music festival, arts festival
- Dates: July 12–14, 1996
- Locations: Mosport Park, Bowmanville, Ontario, Canada
- Years active: 1996
- Founders: Mark Drost
- Website: website

Edenfest was 3-day concert that took place July 12–14, 1996 at Mosport Park, in Bowmanville, Ontario, Canada.

The concert sold over 70,000 tickets total for the 3 day event and was attended by another estimated 20,000 people who walked into the concert site after the outside security broke down. This festival that included music as well as multiple other types of performers was held by Eden Entertainment Group based in Buffalo, New York. The concert was one of the first major concerts to be streamed live over the internet. This event was the largest rock festival held in Canada to date. Artists that performed include The Tragically Hip, The Cure, Porno for Pyros, Bush, Live, the Goo Goo Dolls, Ani DiFranco and over 50 other performers.

The event was considered a creative success; however, the promoter of the event, Mark Drost, was plagued with financial problems due to several forces beyond his control, including the security breakdown. Edenfest was scheduled to go on for 10 consecutive years at the Mosport site; the promoter was bankrupted by the event, and thus, it did not continue past 1996.

Several non-musicians were in attendance at the event including actors Jason Priestly and Rob Morrow plus comedian Mark McKinney.

== Band list ==
=== Friday, July 12 ===
Main Stage

- The Refreshments
- Lustre
- Glueleg
- Poe
- Spirit of the West
- The Nixons
- 7 Mary 3
- Sloan
- Bush
- The Cure

Second Stage

- The Tails
- Lenni Jabour
- Son
- The Bogmen
- Starkicker
- Merlin
- Lotion
- Shed 7
- Stabbing Westward
- Gravity Kills

=== Saturday, July 13 ===
Main Stage

- Elk
- Tracy Bonham
- Spacehog
- Everclear
- Odds
- Love & Rockets
- Porno For Pyros
- Live
- The Tragically Hip

Second Stage

- Hoarse
- Supergarage
- Hell Billys
- Muse (note: not the English rock band of the same name est. 1994; the English band was not yet touring internationally in 1996)
- Ruth Ruth
- 7 Year Bitch
- Letters to Cleo
- Solution A.D.
- Screamin' Cheetah Wheelies
- Skydiggers
- Blinker the Star
- Buzzcocks

=== Sunday, July 14 ===
Main Stage

- Doughboys
- James Hall
- Spin Doctors
- The Mighty Mighty Bosstones
- Howard Jones
- Goo Goo Dolls
- Catherine Wheel
- The Watchmen
- Ani DiFranco

Second Stage

- The Femmes
- Jenny Anykind
- Rain Still Falls
- The Gufs
- Blinker the Star
- Holly McNarland
- Pluto
- The Gandharvas
- hHead
- Universal Honey
