= For All We Know =

For All We Know may refer to:

- "For All We Know" (1934 song), a song by Sam M. Lewis and J. Fred Coots
- "For All We Know" (1970 song), a song by Robb Wilson, Fred Karlin, and Arthur James, made popular by the Carpenters
- For All We Know (Ruud Jolie album), 2011
- For All We Know (Nao album), 2016

== See also ==
- All We Know (disambiguation)
