= Pussy's Dead =

Studio album by Autolux
- Released: April 1, 2016
- Genre: Experimental rock, electronic
- Length: 38:22
- Label: 30th Century Records
- Producer: Boots

Autolux chronology
Transit Transit (2010)	Pussy's Dead (2016)

Pussy's Dead is the third studio album by American alternative rock band Autolux, released April 1, 2016, as the first release of Danger Mouse's Columbia Records imprint, 30th Century Records. The album was produced by Boots. The album's artwork was created by Australian artist Anthony Lister. The album's first single, "Soft Scene", was released November 19, 2015, followed by second single "Brainwasher" on March 25, 2016.

== Track listing ==
All tracks are written by Autolux.

No.	Title	Length
1.	"SelectAllCopy"	4:25
2.	"Soft Scene"	5:05
3.	"Hamster Suite"	3:03
4.	"Junk for Code"	3:22
5.	"Anonymous"	2:48
6.	"Brainwasher"	3:07
7.	"Listen to the Order"	4:16
8.	"Reappearing"	2:51
9.	"Change My Head"	5:04
10.	"Becker"	4:21

== Critical reception ==
Professional ratings
Review scores
Source	Rating
AllMusic	3.5/5 stars
Consequence of Sound	B−
Pitchfork	7.2

Reviews were positive. Pitchfork reviewer Ron Hart praised the drum tracks, saying, "When you talk about the best drummers of the last 15 years, Autolux's Carla Azar is near the top of that list". Hart also admired the production: "For those of us who have been in Autolux's corner since they first emerged from Los Angeles, it's been a bit trying to watch this group hide in plain sight. All kudos go to Boots for parlaying this influence he's garnered producing the likes of Beyoncé, Run the Jewels and FKA twigs to help craft this record for a band whose breakthrough moment has eluded them for long enough".

Consequence of Sound called the record a "sweaty coupling of independent and mainstream musical aesthetics", while AllMusic writer Timothy Monger said, "On their third record in 12 years, L.A. alt-rock trio Autolux serve up a stark melding of techno-manipulation and dark-toned experimental pop".

== Personnel ==
- Greg Edwards – vocals, guitar, synths, piano
- Carla Azar – drums, vocals, synths, percussion
- Eugene Goreshter – bass, vocals, synths

Additional musicians and production

- Boots – producer, engineering
- Tyler Parkford – backing vocals (track 9)
- Kenny Takahashi – engineering, mix engineering (tracks 1, 2 (outro), 3, 4, 9)
- Stuart White – mix engineering (tracks 2(1st half), 5, 6, 7, 8)
- Joe LaPorta - mastering engineer
- Anthony Lister – cover art
- Julian Gross – design
