= Failure (band) =

American alternative rock band

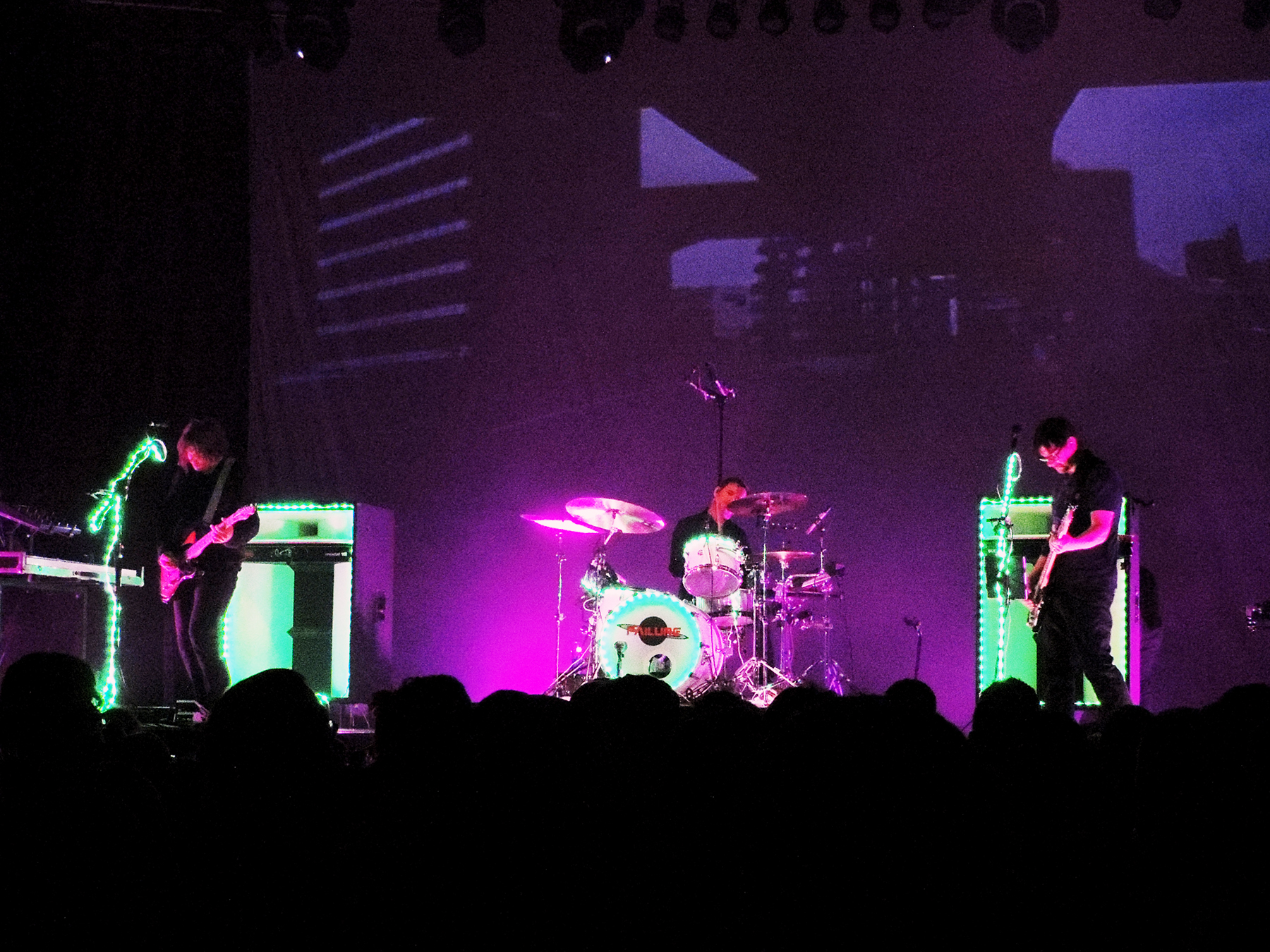
- Failure performing in 2014

Background information
- Origin: Los Angeles, California, U.S.
- Genres: Alternative rock; space rock revival; post-grunge; art rock
- Years active: 1990–1997; 2014–present
- Labels: Slash/Warner Bros.; Failure Records; PIAS
- Members: Ken Andrews; Greg Edwards; Kellii Scott
- Past members: Robert Gauss; Troy Van Leeuwen
- Website: failureband.com
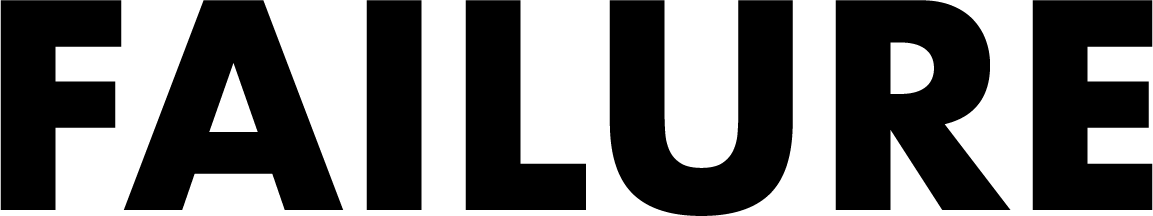

Failure is an American alternative rock band from Los Angeles that was active from 1990 to 1997 and again since 2014. They have released seven full-length albums and five EPs.

== History ==
=== 1990–1997: Formation, Comfort, Magnified and Fantastic Planet ===
In 1992, Failure signed with Slash Records (an LA-based independent label whose releases were manufactured and distributed by Warner Bros. in the United States), and went to Minnesota to record their debut album with producer Steve Albini at Pachyderm Studio that summer. Comfort was released in September 1992, and around this same time, they went on their first of several tours with Tool.

The band were unsatisfied with the sound of Comfort and their lack of involvement in the mixing process; they wanted a more flattering, produced sound that went beyond Albini's style of essentially documenting a band's raw live sound. So when the band went back into the studio in 1993, Andrews and Edwards took on the role of producers themselves. Midway through these sessions, Gauss left the band, so Edwards played some drums himself, until a replacement was found in Kellii Scott. Their second album, Magnified, was released in March 1994; a promotional video (the band's first) was made for the single "Undone", but it received little airtime, if any, on any of the traditional music video outlets. Critics took note of the sonic and musical advances achieved on Magnified, and other more well-known musicians also began singing Failure's praises. That year, they again went on tour with Tool, and during Failure's set each night, Tool guitarist Adam Jones joined them onstage to play rhythm guitar on the Comfort track "Macaque".

Anxious to build on the momentum afforded to them by the relative success of Magnified, Andrews, Edwards, and Scott began recording again in 1995, this time in a rented home owned by Lita Ford in the hills just outside LA. With the band again producing themselves, and Andrews handling the lion's share of the engineering himself, the situation allowed the band to take far more time in recording than they ever had before, and follow their instincts as far as they chose without outside interference. As the recordings neared completion, they received word that their label's distribution deal with Warner had expired and would not be renewed. Since Failure was essentially sidelined while the owners of Slash were trying to negotiate a new distribution deal, the band members kept themselves busy with outside projects: Andrews and Edwards (and friends) recorded an album of covers under the name Replicants; Andrews produced albums for Blinker the Star and Molly McGuire (the Kansas City-based rock band, not the LA-based singer-songwriter); Scott did some session work. Meanwhile, the band continued to "unofficially" shop the record to other labels and industry personnel, while hoping that Warner would step up and release the album. In the spring of 1996, Warner did exactly that, agreeing to keep the Slash imprint one last time for Failure, and Fantastic Planet was released that August. Guitarist Troy Van Leeuwen, a friend and former bandmate of Scott's, joined Failure around the time of the album's release. The album's first single, "Stuck on You" became an alternative-radio hit and achieved light to medium rotation on MTV, but failed to chart significantly. The song first charted in December 1996, then in January it peaked at No. 31 on the U.S. Billboard Mainstream Rock chart and No. 23 on the Modern Rock chart. Other songs, such as "Saturday Saviour" and "Pitiful", received some airplay from more adventurous-minded DJs, but no more videos were made for any of the album's tracks, and due to the state of disarray at their label at that time, little effort was put into its promotion.

In 1997, the band were asked by friends in the industrial rock band God Lives Underwater to contribute a track for the Depeche Mode tribute album that they were assembling: For the Masses. Failure chose to cover the 1990 hit "Enjoy the Silence". That summer, Failure also joined the Lollapalooza tour, during what became the last of that tour's travelling years. Originally booked to headline the side stage, Failure was promoted to also perform on the main stage to fill the void created when Korn dropped out; Failure played both an early afternoon set on the main stage and a longer headlining set in the evening on the side stage for the remainder of the tour.

On November 19, 1997, Failure officially announced that they had disbanded, citing personal differences.

=== 1997–2013: Post-breakup work ===
Ken Andrews has gone on to become a well-known producer, engineer, and mixer, and has been involved in several different music projects. ON (1999–2002) was more or less a solo project, and was not unlike Failure, in terms of songwriting, but the overall sound was more based on electronics, with less emphasis on guitars and the typical heavy rock sound. Year of the Rabbit (2002–2004) saw Andrews' return to the four-piece rock band format, alongside ON's touring drummer, Tim Dow, and former members of National Skyline and Cupcakes; the harder-rocking sound of YotR is much closer to that of Failure, but the band lost momentum and eventually went on indefinite hiatus after their label, Elektra Records, was ostensibly shut down by in the wake of its merger with Atlantic Records. Currently, Andrews is performing as a solo artist, as well as collaborating in a self-described "digital band" called Los Angeles Digital Noise Academy, whose loose membership also includes Brad Laner (Medicine), Sharky Laguana (Creeper Lagoon), Charlotte Martin (whom Andrews married in 2005), Jordon Zadorozny (Blinker the Star) and others. He released his first solo album, Secrets of the Lost Satellite, in 2007. He has also started a label, Dinosaur Fight Records, which has released his solo album and Martin's, and has announced their intention to release the forthcoming LADNA album, as well.

Greg Edwards collaborated with fellow musicians Chris Pitman, Brad Laner, and Paul D'Amour in the psychedelic pop outfit Lusk, releasing the album Free Mars in 1997. In 2000, Edwards formed the band Autolux in with vocalist/bassist Eugene Goreshter and former Ednaswap drummer Carla Azar. Their self-produced, self-released 2001 EP Demonstration brought them to the attention of legendary producer T Bone Burnett, who used his vanity label DMZ to secure them a contract with Sony BMG Music Entertainment and produced their debut album, Future Perfect, which was released in October 2004 to general critical praise. They were hand-picked by Trent Reznor to open for Nine Inch Nails' North American arena tour in the autumn of 2005, playing bottom of the bill before Queens of the Stone Age. In 2006, they collaborated on a few tracks with the British musical outfit Unkle, for Unkle's 2007 release, War Stories. After various delays, Autolux released their second album, Transit Transit, in 2010.

Kellii Scott joined Blinker the Star after Failure's breakup, and then joined Campfire Girls for their 2003 album, Tell Them Hi. Scott also played on a track titled 'Best Friend' by Size 14 bassist Robt Ptak on his solo project Artificial Joy, Ptak put this on his own personal reverbnation page in 2013. As of 2005, he was playing drums for both Veruca Salt and Enemy. In 2008, his most recent band The Brontosaur released their self-titled album. From 2008 to 2012 Kellii could be heard playing on all Linda Perry's recording sessions, most notably Christina Aguilera's song "You Lift Me Up" and Courtney Love's "Letter To God". And in 2013 he worked with the Dr Dre and a 72 piece orchestra at Capitol studios for a song on his upcoming album.

Troy Van Leeuwen first resurfaced in the original lineup of A Perfect Circle, appearing on their debut album, Mer De Noms (2000), and on the subsequent tour. During the sessions for APC's second album, Van Leeuwen was extended an invitation to join Queens of the Stone Age, which he accepted; he does appear on three tracks on the second APC album, Thirteenth Step (2003), but the included cover of Failure's "The Nurse Who Loved Me" is not one of them. He has remained with Queens of the Stone Age since then, first appearing on the tour for their 2002 album, Songs for the Deaf, but not on the album itself. Also, during this time, Van Leeuwen assembled Enemy, a vehicle in which he is the front man and guitarist; their debut album, Hooray for Dark Matter, was released in October 2005. In 2008 Van Leeuwen formed the band Sweethead with vocalist Serrina Sims, who also provided backing vocals on Queens of the Stone Age single Make It wit Chu on the album Era Vulgaris, in 2007. The bands roster was rounded up with Norm Block formerly of Plexi and Troy's former Enemy bandmate Eddie Nappi.

In 2004, although the band had been inactive for many years, Andrews and Edwards got together to collaborate on a CD/DVD set entitled Golden, which collects demos, outtakes, touring footage, both of the band's videos, and other rare material from the band's active period. Another posthumous compilation, a 2-CD set titled Essentials, was assembled for release in 2006; the first disc contains selected tracks from Failure's three studio albums, and the second disc features the first official CD release of all four songs from their two pre-Slash singles, and the complete demos for Magnified. In 2008, a tribute album to Failure was released titled: "A Tribute to Failure: The Nurse Who Loved Me." On June 8, 2010, Fantastic Planet was planned to be released on a 2LP vinyl set for the first time from Warner Bros. Both Magnified and Comfort were released on LP for the first time in the second half of 2011 by Org Music (Magnified was delayed until late 2013). The 2010 limited LP release of Fantastic Planet were in such high demand, that they were fetching hundreds of dollars online. In 2016 as part of their pledge project for The Heart Is A Monster, the band re-released Fantastic Planet on vinyl once more.

=== 2013–2017: Reunion, Tree of Stars, The Heart is a Monster ===
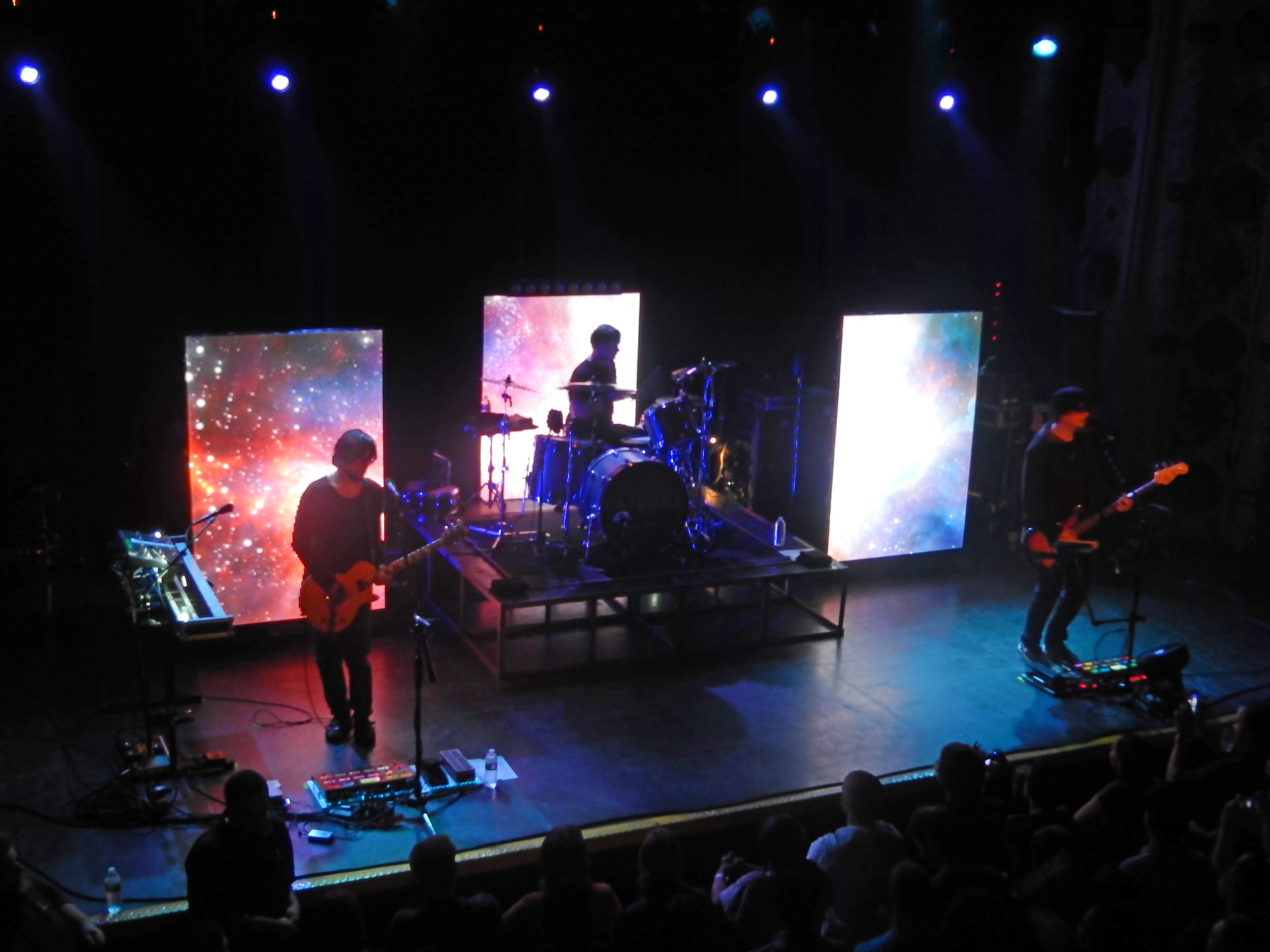
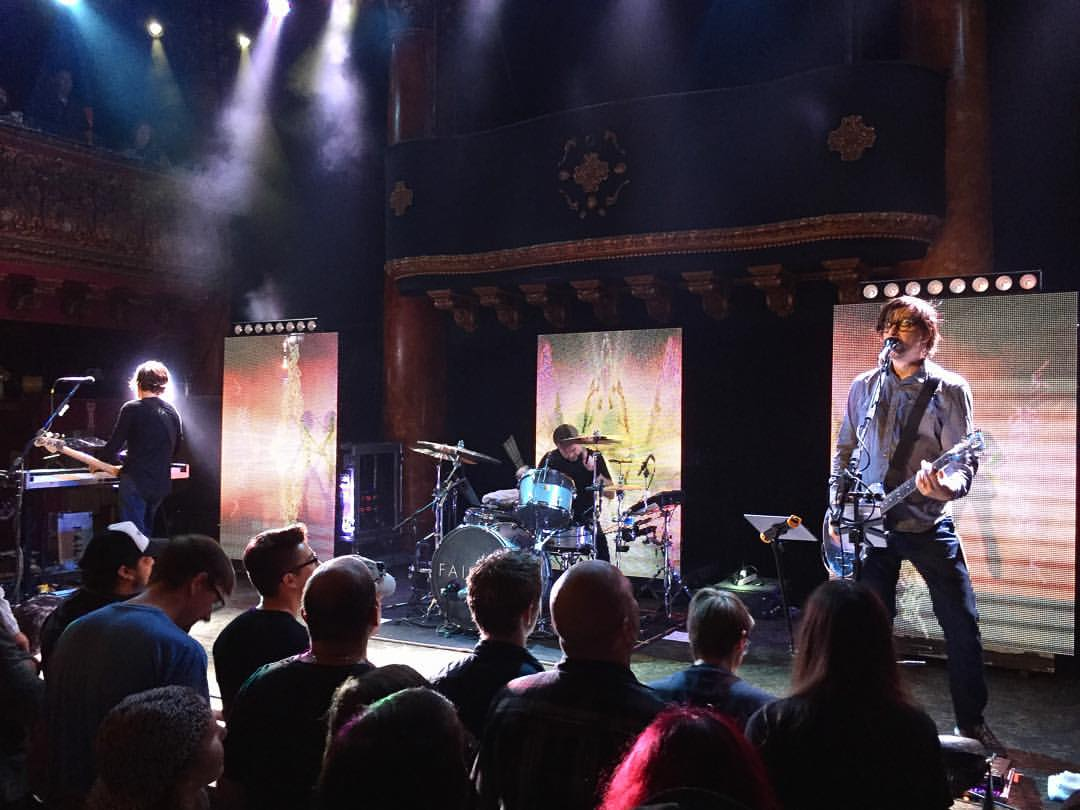
Failure performing in 2015

Failure announced their reunion in late 2013. With the "classic lineup" of Greg Edwards, Ken Andrews and Kellii Scott, they performed their first show since 1997 at the El Rey Theatre in Los Angeles on February 13, 2014. The members had said they had heard rumors that they were even more beloved now than in the 90s, and decided to see if it was true, and the show sold out in less than 5 minutes, which had never happened in the 90s. It was subsequently announced that the band would open for Tool on their upcoming tour.

After the first leg, starting in March and culminating with the "Cinquanta" shows on May 10 and 11 at The Greek Theater in Los Angeles, Failure's separate "Tree of Stars" tour took place during May and June 2014 for 18 performances. A tour exclusive EP entitled Tree of Stars was available during this leg. The EP contains 4 live tracks and their first new song since Fantastic Planet, entitled "Come Crashing". On May 14, Failure released the track on their Bandcamp following with "The Focus" on July 14, 2014. Failure commenced work on their fourth album in late 2014, which was significant as their first album in over eighteen years.

On March 30, Failure announced their fourth studio album The Heart Is a Monster, spanning 18 tracks, which was released on June 30 through INgrooves. This announcement coincided with the release of the new single "Hot Traveler," which the band debuted at SXSW earlier that month. Troy Van Leeuwen was not cited as returning to the band, however, he contributed guitar work on several tracks and would participate in its October 2015 tour.

In 2016 Failure announced an October tour where they would be playing Fantastic Planet in its entirety to celebrate the album's 20 year anniversary. On Thanksgiving 2016, Failure announced they'd be releasing Fantastic Planet live, using tracks recorded during the Fantastic Planet Anniversary tour. On December 8, 2017, Failure's Slash Records albums were acquired by PIAS Recordings, as part of Warner Music Group's divestment of artist catalogues to indie labels.

=== 2018–present: In the Future... EP/LP releases, Wild Type Droid and Location Lost ===
On March 14, 2018, Failure announced a series of four EPs, with the first, In the Future, released on March 30. The remaining three will be released throughout 2018 and will eventually culminate in a complete full-length studio album later in the year. The second EP, Your Body Will Be, was released on May 25, 2018, and the third, The Furthest Thing, was released on September 14, 2018. The finished album, titled In the Future Your Body will Be the Furthest Thing from Your Mind was released on November 16, 2018, with the completion of the fourth and final EP, From Your Mind. In support of the new album, Failure embarked on a 29 city tour starting March 11, 2019, and ending April 24, 2019. They were joined by Swervedriver as a co-headlining act on the tour.

While Failure had previously financed two projects, the 2015 album The Heart is a Monster and the 2016 live album Fantastic Planet Live, using the crowdfunding website PledgeMusic, the band announced in March 2019 that they were not paid at the end of a similar crowdfunding campaign for In The Future.... The band advised supporters to seek remedies from their credit card companies as PledgeMusic declared bankruptcy in May 2019. Andrews said that, following the PledgeMusic bankruptcy, major label artists were refunded but independent and self-funded musicians were left out.

On December 16, 2019, Failure announced their vinyl box set Failure 1992–1996, which includes their albums Comfort, Magnified, and Fantastic Planet. The band was to embark on 2020 residency shows in Chicago, Los Angeles, and New York City in support of its release, however the COVID-19 pandemic resulted in the cancellation of all dates.

On July 3, 2020, the band released a re-recorded cover of "Enjoy the Silence", titled "Enjoy the Silence 2020" for sale on Bandcamp. Failure had originally covered the song in 1998 for the tribute album For the Masses and re-recorded the song due to the album being hard to find, being out of print for several years and not available on streaming sites. Ken Andrews stated that Failure received the blessing of Depeche Mode for the updated cover.

As of December 2021, Failure moved their digital releases to Bandcamp going forward, including prior albums released with Ingrooves & Slash Records. On February 1, 2022, Failure released a statement that they would be removing their music from Spotify due to policies regarding COVID vaccine misinformation and artist royalties. Albums under Rhino Records, who purchased the rights to Slash's back catalog, remains on the service.

Ken Andrews appeared on a podcast by Shiner's Allen Epley on April 26, 2021, stating that Failure was currently working on music for an upcoming album. The band's sixth studio LP, Wild Type Droid, was released on December 3, 2021. On January 12, 2022, Failure announced a tour to support the new album during June & July 2022. Debuting at the "Wild Type Droid" tour, a documentary of the band was announced with interview footage previewed in place of an opening act. The footage was shot as far back as 2016 (of note, Matt Pinfield before the December 2018 accident that incapacitated him for months). It was announced that the producers turned over the footage of the incomplete project to Failure as of 2023.

The concert film We Are Hallucinations featuring performances from the band's Wild Type Droid tour was released to Veeps on December 15, 2022. A blu-ray version was released on July 6, 2023.

Failure's seventh album, Location Lost, was released on April 24, 2026. The band will tour in April and May of 2026.

== Musical style ==
Musically, the band has been described as alternative rock, art rock, space rock, post-grunge and alternative metal. However in December 2021, Edwards stated that the band may be leaning away from the space rock themes and iconography in their future work. Failure has cited a number of bands as influences, including Sonic Youth, the Pixies, Big Star, the Cars, the Police, Miles Davis, AC/DC, Led Zeppelin, Nirvana, Killing Joke, Radiohead, Japan, Rush, Peter Gabriel, David Bowie, George Michael, Kate Bush, the Beatles, Pink Floyd, and the Cure.

They have been cited as an influence by Paramore, Deftones, Limp Bizkit, Cloakroom, Basement, and Cave In.

== Band members ==
Current members

- Ken Andrews – vocals, guitar, bass (1990–1997, 2014–present); keyboards (2014–present)
- Greg Edwards – bass, guitar (1990–1997, 2014–present); piano, keyboards (1995–1997, 2014–present); drums (1993)
- Kellii Scott – drums (1993–1997, 2014–present)

Former members

- Robert Gauss – drums (1990–1993)
- Troy Van Leeuwen – guitar (1996–1997, 2015–2016)

== Discography ==
=== Studio albums ===
- Comfort (1992)
- Magnified (1994)
- Fantastic Planet (1996)
- The Heart Is a Monster (2015)
- In the Future Your Body Will Be the Furthest Thing from Your Mind (2018)
- Wild Type Droid (2021)
- Location Lost (2026)

=== Compilation albums ===
- Golden (2004)
- Essentials (2006)
- 1992–1996 (2020)

=== Live albums ===
- Fantastic Planet Live (2017)
- We Are Hallucinations (2023)

=== Extended plays ===
- Tree of Stars (2014)
- In the Future (2018)
- Your Body Will Be (2018)
- The Furthest Thing (2018)
- From Your Mind (2018)

=== Concert films ===
- We Are Hallucinations (2023)

=== Singles ===
- "Count My Eyes"/"Comfort" (1991)
- "Pro-Catastrophe"/"Dipped In Anger" (1991)
- "Empty Friend" [Promo] (1994)
- "Moth" [Promo] (1994)
- "Stuck on You" (1996)
- "Pitiful" [Promo] (1996)
- "Saturday Savior" [Promo] (1996)
- "Solaris 2014"/"Shrine" (2014)
- "The Focus" (2014)
- "Hot Traveler" (2015)
- "Mulholland Dr." (2015)
- "Enjoy the Silence 2020" (2020)
- "Headstand" (2021)
- "Submarines" (2021)
- "Waiting Room" (2022)
- “The Air’s On Fire” (2026)
- "The Rising Skyline" (2026)

=== Music videos ===
- "Undone" (Magnified)
- "Stuck on You" (Fantastic Planet)
- "Hot Traveler" (The Heart Is a Monster)
- "Counterfeit Sky" (The Heart Is a Monster)
- "Dark Speed" (In the Future Your Body Will Be the Furthest Thing from Your Mind)
- "Headstand" (Wild Type Droid)
- "The Air's on Fire" (Location Lost)
- "The Rising Skyline" (Location Lost)
