= Emergency (Paramore song) =

Single by Paramore

from the album All We Know Is Falling
- B-side: "Oh Star"
- Released: October 21, 2005
- Recorded: 2005
- Genre: Emo
- Length: 4:00
- Label: Fueled by Ramen
- Songwriters: Hayley Williams; Josh Farro
- Producer: James Wisner

Paramore singles chronology
"Pressure" (2005)	"Emergency" (2005)	"All We Know" (2006)

Music video
- "Emergency" on YouTube

"Emergency" is a song by American rock band Paramore. It was released on October 21, 2005, as the second single from their debut studio album, All We Know Is Falling. It was released on 7" vinyl in the United Kingdom on August 26, 2006, and contained the B-side "Oh, Star," and a poster of the band. The song was written by Hayley Williams and Josh Farro. It failed to chart in the United States, however, it was released in Kerrang!s "Class of '06" compilation CD, calling it one of the best rock tracks of that year. An alternative post-hardcore version of the song, providing a heavier sound and screamed vocals, was released on The Summer Tic EP in 2006.

== Background and composition ==
The song is about the fact that love is taken for granted, and how most relationships are in emergency status. It is also about Williams' witnessing her parents' argument and failing marriage as a child. During an interview with the February 2008 edition of Alternative Press, Williams said,

"I remember actually walking out the door with my mom that night and standing in between my parents and screaming "Shut up! Shut up! Shut up!"

There have been several versions of the song released, including the original, a live version in Anaheim (featured on an extended edition of Riot!), and a "Crab Mix", more commonly known as the "Screamo Version" which features screaming vocals introduced in some parts. Since its release, "Emergency" has been labeled as an emo track.

== Reception ==
Alternative Press included the song in its list of 10 Emo Songs From 2005 That Never Left Your Playlist. Ed Masley at The Arizona Republic ranked it as the 11th best Paramore song, stating "this one offsets melancholy jangling with headbanging power chords, the jangling underscoring Williams' bittersweet delivery as she sets the tone with a pout of, "I think we have an emergency.""

== Music video ==
The beginning of the music video opens with Paramore having minor but bloody injuries, sitting a room looking miserable. They wear dirtied but formal clothing with red roses pinned to them. In between cut scenes are of them performing outside. Then a man (Shane Drake) walks in the room Paramore are in, tosses a rose at Williams, and gestures them to follow him. All of them go outside where there is a stage (being) set up for them to perform. The man is apparently the director and before he mouths the word, "Action!" makeup artists apply more to the bloody injuries on the band members. And as the band performs, there are cut scenes of Williams sitting in a chair from the beginning and singing along to the song.

== Live performances ==
Paramore performed this song live in Anaheim, opening their "All We Know Is Falling" tour. The song was extended to have a piano introduction, which was played by Hayley, whom also did lead vocals. "Emergency" was also played live on "The Final Riot" tour and also given an extended piano introduction. This version of the song is also included in "The Final Riot" album/DVD set.

== Track listing ==
No.	Title	Length
1.	"Emergency"	4:00
2.	"Oh Star" (Single version)	3:48

== Certifications ==
Region	Certification	Certified units/sales
United States (RIAA)	Gold	500,000^{‡}
^{‡} Sales+streaming figures based on certification alone.
