= Stuck on You (Failure song) =

Single by Failure

from the album Fantastic Planet
- Released: 1996
- Genre: Alternative rock
- Length: 3:53 (Radio Edit); 4:29 (Album Edit)
- Label: Slash; Warner Bros.
- Songwriters: Ken Andrews; Greg Edwards
- Producer: Failure

Failure singles chronology
"Empty Friend" (1994)	"Stuck on You" (1996)	"Saturday Savior" (1996)

"Stuck on You" is a song from the American alternative rock band Failure. It was released as the lead single from their third album Fantastic Planet. It was their only song to chart at Billboard, reaching number 23 on the U.S. Modern Rock Tracks and number 31 on the U.S. Mainstream Rock Tracks charts—both in January 1997, a month after entering the charts.

American rock band Paramore covered the song on their The Summer Tic EP, with the title taken from the song lyrics, with "tick" being replaced by "tic".

== Music video ==
A music video was released around 1997, which resembles the opening credits from the movie The Spy Who Loved Me of the James Bond franchise, airing a few times on MTV. It appeared later on their Golden compilation. Guitarist Troy Van Leeuwen appears in the video but did not perform on the track, as he had joined the group after the album had been recorded.

On April 8 2020, Ken Andrews on his YouTube channel took a call from director Phil Harder to discuss how the video was made, and released a new transfer of the video from the recently recovered film copy. It was upscaled to High Definition playback.

== Track listing ==
1. "Stuck On You" (radio edit) – 3:53
2. "Stuck On You" (album version) – 4:29

== Chart performance ==
Chart (1995)	Peak position
Modern Rock Tracks	23
Hot Mainstream Rock Tracks	31

Region	Date	Format(s)	Label(s)	Ref.
United States	1996	Alternative radio	Slash Records; Warner Bros	
United States	February 11, 1997	Contemporary hit radio		
