= All We Know (Paramore song) =

Single by Paramore

from the album All We Know Is Falling
- Released: December 16, 2006
- Recorded: 2005
- Genre: Pop-punk
- Length: 3:13
- Label: Fueled by Ramen
- Songwriters: Hayley Williams; Josh Farro
- Producer: James Wisner

Paramore singles chronology
"Emergency" (2005)	"All We Know" (2006)	"Misery Business" (2007)

Music video
- "All We Know" on YouTube

"All We Know" is a song by American rock band Paramore. It was originally released on December 16, 2006, from their debut studio album, All We Know Is Falling (2005). It was written by lead vocalist Hayley Williams, and is about the departure of the band's bassist, Jeremy Davis.

== Background and composition ==
"All We Know" is a pop-punk song about the departure of the band's bass player, Jeremy Davis, and the divorce of Hayley Williams' parents.

== Reception ==
The Bournemouth Daily Echo, in a review of the single, labeled "All We Know" "AN EXTRA helping of mistletoe and whining", describing it as "punky yet comfortable, rather like a safety-pinned pair of slippers". According to MusicOMH, the song is "...full of catchy hooks and lyrics you can scream along to in your bedroom". They go on to remark "they deliver their music with such aplomb that its hard to believe how young they are." Ed Masley at The Arizona Republic ranked it as the 9th best Paramore song, stating "it's held up really well, with its chugging punk guitars and Williams' soaring delivery of lyrics".

== Music video ==
A music video directed by Dan Dobi was filmed during their American tour and features clips of the band performing the song live at several locations.
