= Magnified =

Studio album by Failure
- Released: March 8, 1994
- Recorded: 1993, Kiva West, Encino
- Genre: Alternative rock; grunge; alternative metal
- Length: 49:04
- Label: Slash
- Producer: Failure

Failure chronology
| Comfort (1992) | Magnified (1994) | Fantastic Planet (1996) |

Singles from Magnified
- 1. "Empty Friend" Released: 1994; 2. "Moth" Released: 1994

Professional ratings
Review scores
| Source | Rating |
|---|---|
| AllMusic | 4.5/5 stars |
| Kerrang! | 3/5 stars |

Magnified is the second album by the American alternative rock band Failure. It was released on March 8, 1994, through Slash Records.

== Production ==
Drummer Robert Gauss departed during the recording of the album; the remaining drum parts were played by John Dargahi and Greg Edwards.

Magnified differs from Failure's debut album Comfort by using a great deal of bass guitar distortion. The use of a bassline as the main structure of the song as well as distortion can be heard best on "Frogs" and "Small Crimes."

== Critical reception ==
In a retrospective article published to coincide with the album's 25th anniversary, Decibel wrote that "druggy chord changes slither unpredictably, oftentimes led by a four-string bassquake alongside primal drumming, both delivered with forceful conviction." Trouser Press called the album "a major improvement [over the debut], but not a thorough success," writing that "Failure paints senseless coats of alternative guitar ... over tuneful material that might actually be enticing if not for the underbrush." The Seattle Times wrote that "the songwriting on Magnified is more pop-oriented than on the band's first disc, Comfort, which had more of an improvisational feel." The Albuquerque Journal wrote that "Failure checks into the rock 'n' roll hall of fame as the only band to have less variation between songs than Boston."

== Track listing ==
All music is composed by Ken Andrews and Greg Edwards except "Let It Drip", by Andrews.

| No. | Title | Lyrics | Length |
|---|---|---|---|
| 1. | "Let It Drip" | Andrews | 2:41 |
| 2. | "Moth" | Edwards | 3:50 |
| 3. | "Frogs" | Andrews, Edwards | 4:55 |
| 4. | "Bernie" | Andrews | 5:17 |
| 5. | "Magnified" | Edwards | 4:36 |
| 6. | "Wonderful Life" | Andrews | 5:34 |
| 7. | "Undone" | Andrews, Edwards | 4:27 |
| 8. | "Wet Gravity" | Edwards | 6:06 |
| 9. | "Empty Friend" | Edwards | 4:21 |
| 10. | "Small Crimes" | Edwards | 7:13 |
| Total length: | | | 49:04 |

== Personnel ==
- Ken Andrews – vocals, guitar, bass
- Greg Edwards – bass, guitar, drums
- John Dargahi – drums on 1, 2, 6 & 7

== Credits ==
Recorded by Paul Lani. Mixed by David Bianco and Ken Andrews. Frog: Bruce Schwartz
