= Greg Edwards (musician) =

American musician and songwriter

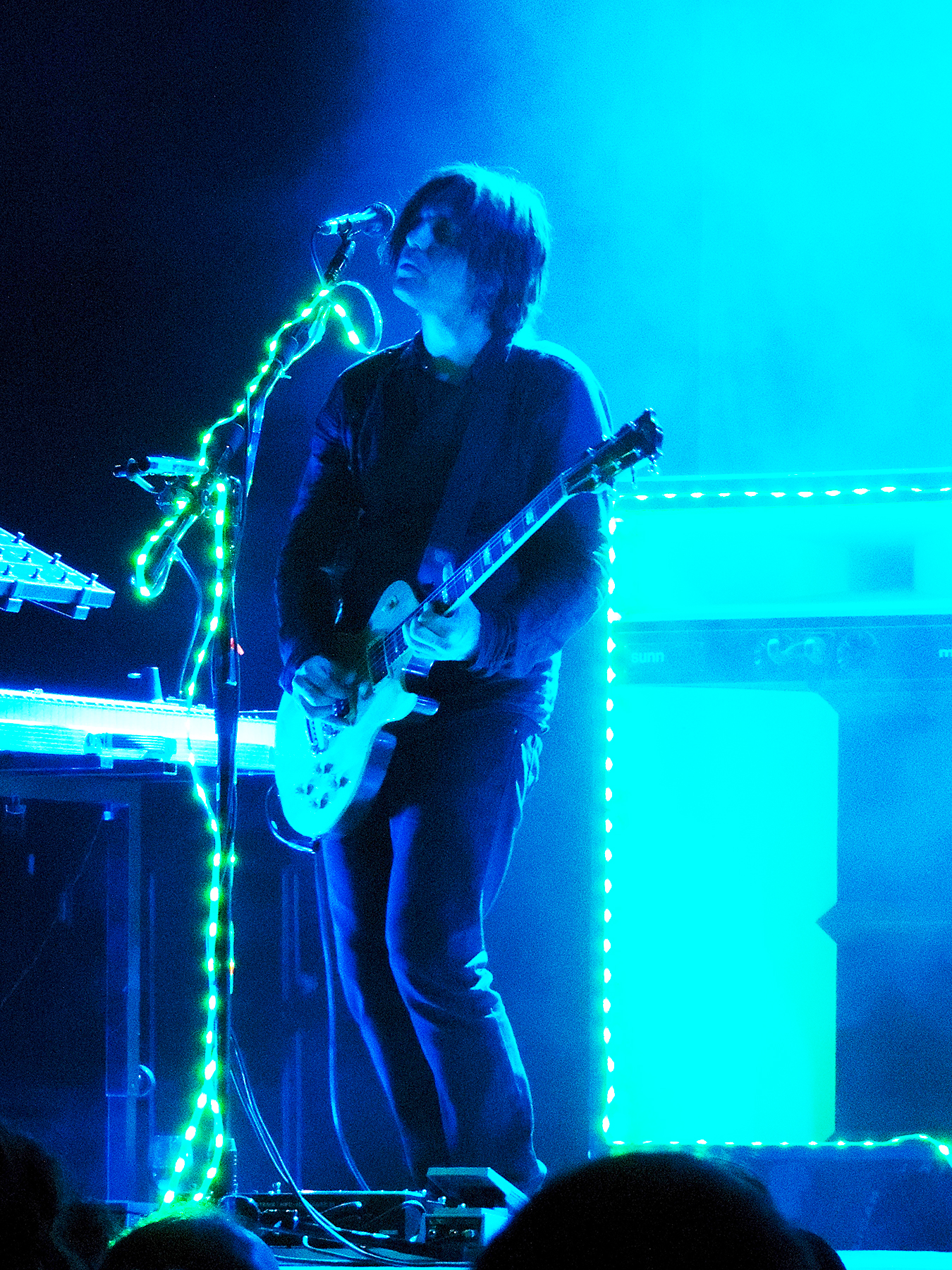
- Greg Edwards performing with Failure in 2014

Background information
- Born: Greg Charles Edwards; December 14, 1970 (age 55)
- Genres: Alternative rock; post-grunge; space rock; electronic; experimental rock; noise pop
- Instruments: Guitar; bass; piano; drums; vocals
- Years active: 1990–present
- Labels: Slash; DMZ; Zoo
- Member of: Failure; Autolux; Puscifer
- Formerly of: Lusk; Replicants; A Perfect Circle

Greg Charles Edwards (born December 14, 1970) is an American musician and songwriter, best known as guitarist and bassist for the rock band Failure. Edwards is a multi-instrumentalist. As a professional musician, he has been active since the 1990 formation of Failure, and also plays guitar and sings in the experimental rock band Autolux. Edwards has 125 song titles to his credit.

== Music career ==
=== Failure ===
Edwards' first band was the Los Angeles-based Failure. That band was active from 1990 until 1997, when bandmate Ken Andrews dissolved the band, citing personal differences. The band re-formed in 2014 with drummer Kellii Scott and embarked on a North American tour before releasing new material in the form of The Heart is a Monster in 2015; as of 2022, they continue to tour and record, having released two more albums.

=== Replicants ===
After the completion of Failure's last studio album before the band officially dissolved, Edwards, along with bandmate Ken Andrews, former Tool bassist Paul D'Amour, and multi-instrumentalist Chris Pitman, formed the cover band Replicants. They released one self-titled record, Replicants in 1996.

=== Lusk ===
Following the release of Replicants and the dissolution of Failure, Paul D'Amour, Brad Laner, and Chris Pitman formed the band Lusk. Lusk released one album, Free Mars. Edwards played extensively on the first half of the album, contributing vocals, guitar, bass, drums, and synthesizers. Free Mars would go on to be nominated for a Grammy for Best Recording Package in 1997.

=== Autolux ===
Formed in 2000 with Carla Azar and Eugene Goreshter, Autolux is Edwards' most current band. They have recorded one promotional EP, Demonstration, and released three full-length studio albums, Future Perfect, in 2004, Transit Transit in August 2010, and Pussy's Dead in March 2016. Whereas he mostly plays bass in Failure, Edwards is the guitarist and co-lead vocalist in Autolux; he served as engineer on Transit Transit.

=== A Perfect Circle ===
Due to James Iha's commitments to The Smashing Pumpkins reunion, Greg Edwards was recruited by A Perfect Circle to play since the 2018 tour, and continued playing with them full time as of June 2026.

=== Puscifer ===
Greg Edwards has also been a touring member of Puscifer.

== Discography ==
=== With Autolux ===
- Demonstration (EP) (2001)
- Future Perfect (2004)
- Transit Transit (2010)
- Pussy's Dead (2016)

=== With Failure ===
- Comfort (1992)
- Magnified (1994)
- Fantastic Planet (1996)
- Golden (2004)
- Essentials (2006)
- Tree of Stars (2014)
- The Heart Is a Monster (2015)
- Fantastic Planet Live (2017)
- In the Future Your Body Will Be The Furthest Thing From Your Mind (2018)
- Wild Type Droid (2021)
- We Are Hallucinations (2023)
- Location Lost (2026)

=== With Replicants ===
- Replicants (1996)

=== With Lusk ===
- Free Mars (1997)
