= Future Perfect (Autolux album) =

Album by Autolux

Studio album by Autolux
- Released: October 26, 2004
- Studio: Sunset Sound (Los Angeles, California); Space 23 (Los Angeles)
- Genre: Indie rock; noise pop; psychedelic rock; shoegaze
- Length: 51:53
- Label: DMZ; RED Ink
- Producer: T Bone Burnett

Autolux chronology
Demonstration (2001)	Future Perfect (2004)	Transit Transit (2010)

Singles from Future Perfect
- 1. "Here Comes Everybody" Released: April 2005

Future Perfect is the debut studio album by American alternative rock band Autolux. It was released on October 26, 2004 by DMZ and RED Ink Records. The album was produced by musician and DMZ co-founder, T Bone Burnett, and was primarily recorded at Sunset Sound Recorders in Los Angeles.

DMZ released Future Perfect on vinyl as a two-LP set, which later went out of print. After the label's demise, Autolux reissued the album themselves in 2009 (on their own label Autolux Music Entertainment) on one 180-gram LP, and again in 2015 and 2025 (also on their own label, now renamed The Autolux Empire) as a two-LP set.

== Musical style ==
Alternative Press described Future Perfect as an album of noise pop and psychedelic rock music. John D. Luerssen of AllMusic said that the album fuses the "guitar blur" of shoegaze with indie rock elements reminiscent of the music of Sonic Youth and Ivy.

== Critical reception ==
Professional ratings
Review scores
Source	Rating
AllMusic	4/5 stars
Alternative Press	5/5
The Austin Chronicle	4/5 stars
Drowned in Sound	8/10
Pitchfork	8.3/10
Tiny Mix Tapes	4.5/5
Uncut	3/5 stars

Reviewing Future Perfect for Pitchfork, Peter Macia found that T Bone Burnett's "laissez-faire" production complemented Autolux's "intense dynamic", allowing the band "to speak for themselves". Macia said of their performance on "Turnstile Blues": "In the first 10 seconds of the album opener, Carla Azar shames most every beat-maker with her ridiculous Liebezeit-cum-Bonham percussion. Azar's sturdy and creative drumming, provides the thrust of Greg Edwards' heavily reverbed and distorted riffs. Meanwhile, Eugene Goreshter sings whispery lullabies of escape and alienation, and his rumbling bass rattles the brain."

In 2016, Pitchfork ranked Future Perfect as the 44th best shoegaze album of all time.

== Track listing ==
All tracks are written by Autolux (Carla Azar, Greg Edwards and Eugene Goreshter).

No.	Title	Length
1.	"Turnstile Blues"	5:40
2.	"Angry Candy"	4:45
3.	"Subzero Fun"	3:56
4.	"Sugarless"	5:22
5.	"Blanket"	4:49
6.	"Great Days for the Passenger Element"	5:20
7.	"Robots in the Garden"	2:05
8.	"Here Comes Everybody"	5:17
9.	"Asleep at the Trigger"	4:45
10.	"Plantlife"	4:12
11.	"Capital Kind of Strain"	5:42
Total length:		51:53

== Personnel ==
Credits are adapted from the album's liner notes.

Autolux

- Carla Azar – drums, vocals
- Greg Edwards – guitar, vocals
- Eugene Goreshter – bass, vocals

Production

- T Bone Burnett – production
- Greg Edwards – recording on "Asleep at the Trigger"
- Stephen Marcussen – mastering
- Mike Piersante – recording
- Dave Sardy – mixing

Design

- Scott Bundy – photography
- Microscopic Butterflies – artwork
- C. Newcomer – photography
- R5-622 – cover photography

== Charts ==
Chart (2004)	Peak position
US Top Dance/Electronic Albums (Billboard)	16
