= Filippo Gaetani =

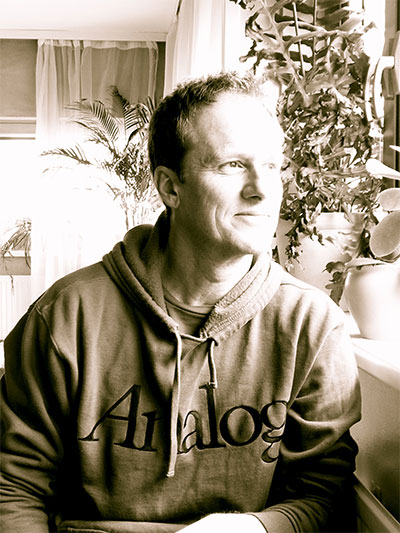
- Born: June 10, 1964 (age 61); Rome, Italy
- Occupations: composer, musician, recording artist, record producer

Filippo Gaetani is a composer, record producer, engineer and musician.

Active since the mid-1980s, he started working as arranger, bassist and guitarist for several underground jazz-rock bands and performing live with his band in northern Italy supporting important Italian live acts such as PFM, Ivano Fossati and Skiantos. After joining Gianluca Mosole band as vocalist, percussionist and co-producer, he performed an entire summer tour supporting acts like Sting, Gil Evans, Miles Davis and Al Di Meola.

In the 1990s, started his work as engineer and producer, recording over 40 jazz-pop-rock albums of Italian and international acts and writing music for TV and writing and recording in Ennio Morricone studio Forum in Rome for the original soundtrack for the movie "Ritorno a Parigi". His collaborations and productions include Stefano Bollani, Andy Bell/Philip Larsen, Katja Werker, Don Grusin, Adrina Thorpe, My Excellence, Erik Friedlander, Tessa Drummond, Peter Doran, Martin Klein, Papermoon.

In 2000, he had chart success with a funk-soul song he wrote for the artist Malina called "By Your Side", remixed and licensed by Tommy Boy label NY, reaching #12 on the Billboard charts.

From 2006 to 2008 he's been part and active contributor of Ken Andrews music collective Los Angeles Digital Noise Academy. He is currently band member, co-writer and co-producer with Jordon Zadorozny and Eric Matthews of the musical project SheLoom. He is the founder of ray recordings and Recording Festival
