= Transit Transit =

Studio album by Autolux
- Released: August 3, 2010
- Genre: Experimental rock, electronic
- Length: 42:02
- Label: ATP Recordings, TBD Records
- Producer: Autolux

Autolux chronology
Future Perfect (2004)	Transit Transit (2010)	Pussy's Dead (2016)

Professional ratings
Review scores
Source	Rating
AllMusic	4/5 stars
BBC	(positive)
The Boston Phoenix	3/4 stars
Consequence of Sound	4/5 stars
NME	8/10 stars

Transit Transit is the second studio album by American alternative rock band Autolux, released on August 3, 2010, on TBD Records (USA) and ATP Recordings (outside of North America/Japan).

== Background ==
Autolux produced Transit Transit themselves with guitarist/vocalist Greg Edwards serving as engineer. Most of the record was recorded at Space 23, the band's makeshift studio in their rehearsal room near downtown Los Angeles. A few drum tracks - "Highchair", "Spots" and "The Science of Imaginary Solutions" - came from an earlier session with engineer John Goodmanson. The title track (the last song to be recorded) was recorded in Denmark by Edwards, using a virtually unplayable upright piano and a sample of a coffin-style freezer found in a nearby basement, and then finished back in Los Angeles.

"Audience No. 2" was self-released on May 21, 2008, to college radio while the band continued to write and record songs that would finally end up on Transit Transit. The single also included two B-sides: the instrumental track "Fat Kid" and a cover of the Beatles' "Helter Skelter".

== Track listing ==
No.	Title	Length
1.	"Transit Transit"	2:54
2.	"Census"	4:40
3.	"High Chair"	3:26
4.	"Supertoys"	4:38
5.	"Spots"	4:37
6.	"The Bouncing Wall"	3:43
7.	"Audience No. 2"	4:35
8.	"Kissproof"	3:27
9.	"Headless Sky"	4:06
10.	"The Science of Imaginary Solutions"	6:03

== Credits ==
- All songs written by Autolux
- Produced by Autolux
- Engineered by Greg Edwards at Space 23
- Mixed by Kennie Takahashi and Dave Sardy
- Mastered by Bob Ludwig
- Artwork by Kill Pixie (a.k.a. Mark Whalen)
