= Comfort (Failure album) =

Studio album by Failure
- Released: September 11, 1992
- Recorded: June 1992
- Studio: Pachyderm (Cannon Falls, Minnesota)
- Genre: Alternative metal
- Length: 37:21
- Label: Slash
- Producer: Failure, Steve Albini

Failure chronology
Comfort (1992)	Magnified (1994)

Singles from Comfort
- 1. "Pro-Catastrophe" Released: 1991

Comfort is the debut studio album by American alternative rock band Failure. It was released in the United States on September 11, 1992, and internationally in February 1993. A version newly-remixed by Ken Andrews was released in 2020 as part of a box set containing Failure's first three albums.

== Critical reception ==
Professional ratings
Review scores
Source	Rating
AllMusic	2.5/5 stars
Chicago Tribune	3/4 stars
Kerrang!	3/5 stars
Orlando Sentinel	2/5 stars
Select	2/5 medals

Billboard wrote that "slow and medium-tempo songs mate drones to screeching guitar work that could make it with grunge-loving modern rockers." Trouser Press gave the album a mixed review, writing that "like most premature debuts, Comfort captures Failure, a young trio, learning how to make cool sounds together without benefit of worthwhile songs or an established personality."

The Chicago Tribune noted that "even when the guitars are turned up to 11, production and arrangements on Comfort have a rather polite surgical precision and clarity." The Orlando Sentinel called Failure "an engrossing three-piece variant on the melody-meets-mayhem theme."

== Track listing ==
All tracks are written by Ken Andrews.

No.	Title	Length
1.	"Submission"	3:23
2.	"Macaque"	4:59
3.	"Something"	2:53
4.	"Screen Man"	6:15
5.	"Swallow"	2:31
6.	"Muffled Snaps"	3:55
7.	"Kindred"	2:21
8.	"Pro-Catastrophe"	3:09
9.	"Princess"	1:21
10.	"Salt Wound"	6:34
Total length:		37:21

== Personnel ==
Failure

- Ken Andrews – vocals, guitar
- Greg Edwards – bass
- Robert Gauss – drums

Technical

- Steve Albini – production
