= Replicante =

Mexican online magazine

Replicante is a Mexican cultural and literary online magazine. Founded in 2004, the magazine, which was printed quarterly, covers a central theme in each issue, such as art, sex, or cities. Regular sections are also included.

The magazine seeks to be an alternative to Nexos and Letras Libres.

The editorial director is Rogelio Villarreal, well known in Mexico's counterculture. Villarreal was the publisher of the countercultural magazines La Regla Rota (The Broken Rule) and La Pusmoderna. Replicante is his first attempt to reach a more mainstream public.

In 2009 Replicante ended print publication and went on online.
