= Autolux =

American rock band

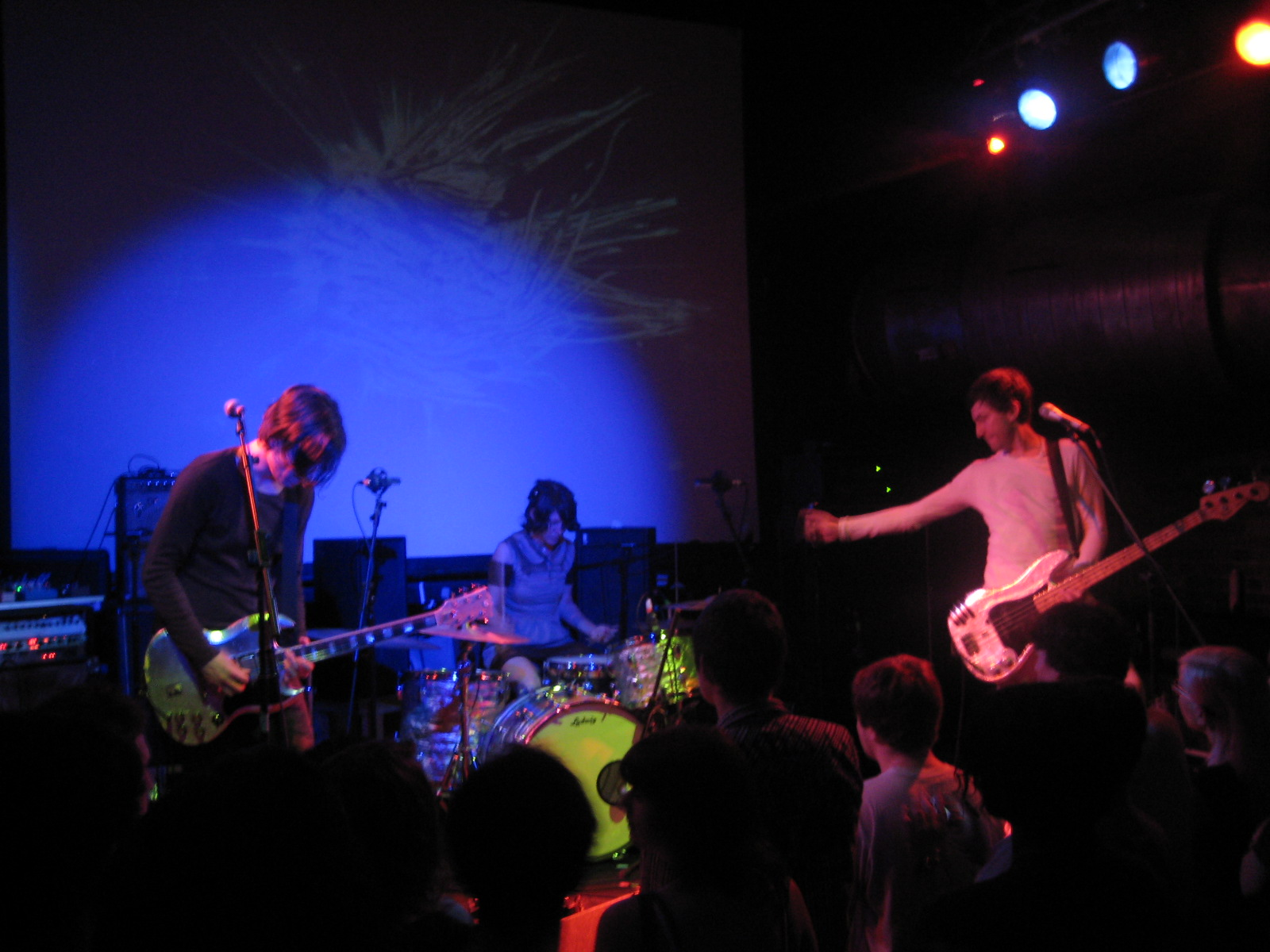
- Autolux live at the Cargo, London (2008)

Background information
- Origin: Los Angeles, California, U.S.
- Genres: Shoegaze, alternative rock, experimental rock, electronic
- Years active: 2001–present
- Labels: DMZ; Full Time Hobby; Red Ink; ATP Recordings; TBD; The Autolux Empire; 30th Century Records; Columbia
- Members: Carla Azar; Greg Edwards
- Past members: Eugene Goreshter
- Website: autolux.net

Autolux is an American alternative rock band formed in Los Angeles, California in 2001. The group formed as a trio and have released three full-length albums, Future Perfect (2004), Transit Transit (2010) and Pussy's Dead (2016). Their sound draws from post-punk, electronic music, krautrock and shoegaze.

== History ==
Autolux was formed in 2001 by drummer-vocalist Carla Azar, guitarist-vocalist Greg Edwards, and bassist-vocalist Eugene Goreshter. Goreshter and Azar met while writing the score for Nobel Prize-winner Dario Fo's play Accidental Death of an Anarchist. Azar met Edwards when she was on tour with his band, Failure. In August 2001, Autolux made their live debut, playing two shows at The Fold in Silverlake Lounge. In March 2001, the band released a self-released EP, Demonstration. It contained five songs recorded on an 8-track in their rehearsal space.

T-Bone Burnett signed Autolux to DMZ, a small label created by Burnett and the Coen Brothers, and "nurtured" the band.

In November 2002, Autolux entered the studio to record their first full-length album, Future Perfect, and finished primary recording in January 2003. In contrast to the 8-track recording method employed during the making of Demonstration, Burnett wished to capture the band's live sound on the album. Following the initial recording, the band continued recording and overdubbing additional music at Space 23 (the band's studio in their rehearsal room) to flesh out the songs. The song "Asleep at the Trigger" was completely recorded at Space 23. At the beginning of 2003, the album was mixed by Dave Sardy. The album was released September 21, 2004, and was generally met with critical praise.

Autolux began touring in 2005 to promote Future Perfect, playing with a number of bands, including Clinic, Broadcast, The White Stripes, Shellac, Deerhoof and Beck.

In April 2005, Autolux played the Vincent Gallo-curated edition of the All Tomorrow's Parties music festival in London, England. In May, they played the Coachella Valley Music and Arts Festival.

Autolux was then invited by Trent Reznor to open for Nine Inch Nails on their With Teeth tour, from September to October 2005. After touring with Nine Inch Nails, the band ended the year by opening for Queens of the Stone Age at the Wiltern Theatre in Los Angeles.

In January 2006, Autolux performed on Jimmy Kimmel Live!

In February 2006, the band wrote a piece, "Tears for an Inhaler", for an exhibit called "Sonic Scenery" at the Natural History Museum of Los Angeles County. The exhibit also included artists such as Matmos and Nels Cline.

In June 2006, Autolux was approached by James Lavelle of Unkle to collaborate on his next record. The band was given an acoustic guitar track with a simple drum machine beat. They developed the song, overdubbed various other tracks and vocals in their rehearsal space, and gave the finished piece, "Persons & Machinery", back to Unkle to arrange and mix. It was included on Unkle's album War Stories, released in July 2007. Goreshter also played bass guitar on a few of the other tracks on the record. On April 30, 2007, Unkle released a limited edition remix 12" called Surrender Sounds Session Session #3 & #4, with the A-side containing a remix of the Autolux track "Turnstile Blues" from Future Perfect.

"Turnstile Blues" appeared as the opening song in the April 2007 movie The Air I Breathe. That August, the band played the Sunset Junction Street Fair in Silver Lake, California, and in December, they were invited by Portishead to play at that month's edition of the All Tomorrow's Parties festival.

Autolux performed at the Primavera Sound festival in Barcelona, Spain in May 2008,; in June, they joined PJ Harvey for a tour of Russia; and in September, they performed at the ATP festival in Monticello, New York, curated by My Bloody Valentine. In September 2009, the band completed their first headlining US tour, including another appearance at the New York ATP festival, this edition curated by Flaming Lips.

As Future Perfect had gone out of print, Autolux reissued the album themselves on vinyl in 2009, with the label listed as Autolux Music Entertainment (and later again in 2015, listed as The Autolux Empire).

In March 2010, Thom Yorke asked Autolux to open for his Atoms for Peace project at the Santa Barbara Bowl in Santa Barbara, California. In May 2010, the band appeared on another Unkle song, "Joy Factory", on that artist's album Where Did the Night Fall.

The second Autolux album, Transit Transit, was released on August 3, 2010, on ATP Recordings worldwide and TBD Records in North America. The band produced Transit Transit themselves with Edwards serving as engineer. Most of the record was recorded at Space 23, while a few drum tracks ("Highchair", "Spots" and "The Science of Imaginary Solutions") came from an earlier session with engineer John Goodmanson. "Supertoys" was released as the first single from the album, premiering on the band's website on June 23, 2010. The band toured the US, Canada and Mexico that August and September.

In December 2010, they embarked on their first European tour. On December 6, 2010, ATP released a two-song 7" single, "The Bouncing Wall"/"Census" (both from Transit Transit); in early 2011, it was reissued digitally by TBD as an EP, with the addition of three previously unreleased tracks.

On February 27, 2011, the band played another ATP festival, this time in Tokyo, Japan, titled "I'll Be Your Mirror".

On November 19, 2015, Autolux shared the "Soft Scene" single and announced that their then-untitled third full-length album would be released in spring 2016 on Danger Mouse's new imprint, 30th Century Records.

On January 19, 2016, Autolux announced the April 1 release of their third album, Pussy's Dead, produced by artist and producer Boots, who had previously produced Run the Jewels, FKA Twigs and Beyoncé. The band was included in the Coachella Festival's 2016 line-up.

In 2020 Goreshter was sentenced to a two-year federal prison term in the US for attempting to import cocaine from Mexico, something the band commented on in a 2023 interview while also revealing he has not been a member since 2016.

== Discography ==
=== Studio albums ===
- Future Perfect (2004, DMZ)
- Transit Transit (2010, ATP/TBD)
- Pussy's Dead (2016, 30th Century Records/Columbia Records)

=== EPs ===
- Demonstration (2001, self-released)
- Six Songs, also known as the Silver Demo (2001, self-released)
- The Bouncing Wall/Census digital EP (2011, TBD)

=== Singles ===
- "Turnstile Blues" promo CD single (2004, Full Time Hobby, Red Ink/DMZ)
- "Here Comes Everybody" 7" single (2004, Full Time Hobby, Red Ink/DMZ)
- Live at KEXP 7" single (2004, Red InkZ)
- "Audience No. 2" digital single (2008, self-released)
- "Supertoys" 7" and CD single (2010, ATP/TBD)
- "The Bouncing Wall"/"Census" 7" single (2010, ATP)
- "Soft Scene" digital single (2015, 30th Century Records/Columbia Records)
- "Brainwasher" digital single (2016, 30th Century Records/Columbia Records)
