= Chris Pitman =

American musician

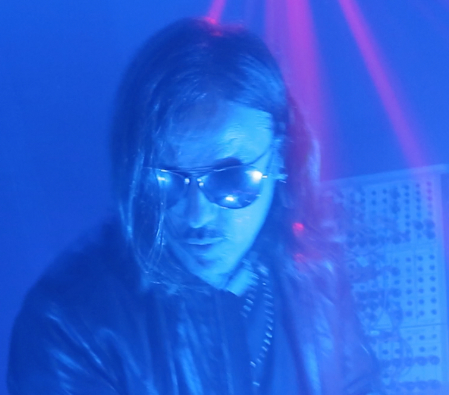
- Chris Pitman performing in 2015

Background information
- Born: November 16, 1961 (age 64); Kansas City, Missouri, U.S.
- Genres: Hard rock; alternative rock; alternative metal; electronica; experimental rock
- Occupations: Singer-songwriter; musician; record producer; audio programmer
- Instruments: Keyboards; guitar; vocals; drums
- Years active: 1979–present
- Labels: ToneRiot; Geffen
- Member of: SexTapes
- Formerly of: Guns N' Roses; Lusk; Replicants; Zaum; Blinker the Star
- Spouse: Ana Pitman

Chris Pitman (born November 16, 1961) is an American musician best known for his involvement with the hard rock band Guns N' Roses. A multi-instrumentalist, Pitman is known to play keyboards, guitar, and drums, in addition to his role as a lead or backing vocalist. Pitman fronts the alternative rock band SexTapes and has previously worked with such groups as Lusk, Replicants, and Tool.

== Early career ==
Pitman studied at the Art Institute of Kansas City and the University of Missouri. In 1993, Pitman worked with the controversial artist Les Levine. The following year, Pitman worked with Dr. Dre in Dre's home studio. He also joined Tool on tour, doing things such as a spoken word part on a live performance of the song "Bottom" and playing synthesizers on Tool's album Ænima. In 1995, he appeared on the album Bourgeois Kitten by Blinker the Star.

== Guns N' Roses (1998–2016) ==
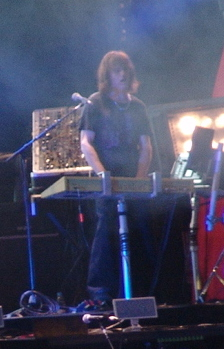
Pitman in 2006 with Guns N' Roses

In early 1998, Pitman joined Guns N' Roses as the band's second keyboardist and second bass player as well as performing backing vocals and percussion. Pitman was recommended to the band by Billy Howerdel, who was working with the band as an engineer at the time. Pitman spent time writing with vocalist Axl Rose at Rose's house frequently.

Pitman was featured on the non-album single "Oh My God" in 1999, and on every song on the long-delayed sixth studio album Chinese Democracy. On the album, Pitman plays mostly keyboards and sub-bass as well as programming and background vocals, he plays a 12-string guitar on "If the World" and a Mellotron on "There Was a Time". He also co-wrote the songs "If the World" and "Madagascar" alongside Rose. He was also responsible for the synth orchestra (along with Dizzy Reed and Rose) on the songs "Street of Dreams", "There Was a Time", "Madagascar", "This I Love" and "Prostitute". Pitman co-wrote (alongside Reed) an unreleased song which was performed live at Rock in Rio III entitled "Silkworms". The song was later re-worked as "ABSUЯD" and released as a single in 2021.

Pitman started performing live with Guns N' Roses in January 2001. He was one of the longest serving members of the band. Pitman filled in for Tommy Stinson on bass in a 2007 show that Stinson was unable to attend. In February 2016, Pitman made headlines for criticizing the upcoming Not In This Lifetime... Tour, calling it a "Nostalgia tour" and stating "please don't mention those who are there the last 20 fucking years ... oh god no!! ... (a money grab) FU." Pitman later apologized for his comments, stating "Remember kids, dont drink n text!". Pitman left the group soon afterwards, saying in an April 2016 interview "I quit the Oldies band, they just wanna repeat that 30 year old music over and over... boring.

Pitman was replaced by Melissa Reese as the second keyboardist In March 2016, two weeks before the tour began.

In August 2016, Pitman sued Axl Rose for $125,000 in unpaid wages. The two parties settled in November 2016.

Pitman appears as keyboardist on the 2023 single "The General", written and partially recorded when he was in the band.

== Musical collaborations ==
Pitman has collaborated with a number of acts, as well as founding a number of experimental projects.

- XR4 – Vocals, electronics in 1982.
- Replicants – Pitman was keyboardist and vocalist of the cover band that featured singer and guitarist Ken Andrews, drummer Greg Edwards, and bassist Paul D'amour.
- ZAUM – electronics, and lead vocals with Danny Carey of Tool, and Marko Fox of SexTapesTM.
- Tool – In 1994–95, Pitman toured with them, and in 1996, he played synths on the song "Third Eye".
- Failure – Contributed sound effects and sound mixing.
- Lusk – Recording, production, mixing, mastering, lead vocals, multi-instrumentation in this Grammy-nominated band in 1996–97.
- Sony Panic – Guitar and live software management with this L.A. experimental/improvisational band in 1997.
- Blinker the Star – Contributed keyboards to the song "Kween Kat" of the album Bourgeois Kitten in 1996. Co-wrote the single "Below the Sliding Doors" in 1998.
- Savvy Soviets – Production/collaboration in Rio de Janeiro in 2003.
- Electric Company – Synthesizer on the album Creative Playthings. Played live with this Brad Laner electronic music project in 2004.
- The Source of Uncertainty – Recording with Danny Carey and others in 2008.
- SexTapes – Working with Kelly Wheeler, Marko Fox, and Ryan Brown starting in 2006.
- Guns N' Roses – In 1998, Pitman joined this hard rock band as songwriter, co-producer, and multi-instrumentalist.
- Beatrazr – EDM music project with Frank Ferrer.

== Workshop projects ==
Pitman has also done sound design and electronic work for Arturia software synthesizers, A Designs Audio [Peter Montessi], Waves Plugins, Waldorf Synthesizers, Apple's Logic Audio, Digidesign Plugins, Moog Synthesizers, Celemony's Melodyne, Ableton Live, Roland USA, Korg Music, Serge Synthesis (SMS), PlanB Synthesis (Peter Grenader, Axel Hartmann) Neuron Synthesis, Symbolic Sounds Kyma, Mandala Drums, Steven Slate Drums and Native Instruments.

Pitman was co-founder of Los Angeles–based art coalition 'Priory of the North,' which focuses on conceptual/public art and works primarily with oil painting, lithography, oils, and metal. His Land/Environment projects have been onsite in various Midwest regional farmland sites in Lafayette County and Johnson County, Missouri. His Rio de Janeiro site-specific work titled "Mind/Land" has been delayed until permits and visas for such materials can be imported. This work has been in progress since 2003.
