= Replicants (album) =

Studio album by Replicants
- Released: November 21, 1995
- Recorded: 1995
- Genres: Alternative metal; alternative rock
- Length: 52:15
- Label: Zoo
- Producer: Replicants

Professional ratings
Review scores
Source	Rating
AllMusic	3/5 stars
MSN	2.5/5 stars

Replicants is the debut and only studio album by American rock band Replicants, released on November 21, 1995, by Zoo Entertainment.

== Track listing ==
1. "Just What I Needed" - 3:43 (The Cars)
2. "Silly Love Songs" - 7:30 (Wings)
3. "Life's a Gas" - 3:12 (T. Rex)
4. "Cinnamon Girl" - 3:38 (Neil Young)
5. "How Do You Sleep?" - 6:08 (John Lennon)
6. "Destination Unknown" - 5:09 (Missing Persons)
7. "No Good Trying" - 1:16 (Syd Barrett)
8. "Are 'Friends' Electric?" - 4:30 (Gary Numan)
9. "Dirty Work" - 4:56 (Steely Dan)
10. "The Bewlay Brothers" - 7:14 (David Bowie)
11. "Ibiza Bar" - 4:59 (Pink Floyd)

== Track information ==
- "Silly Love Songs" features Maynard James Keenan on guest vocals. Because of this, it is sometimes mistaken as being a Tool or A Perfect Circle cover when taken out of context.
