= Replicants (band) =

American rock band

- Genres: Alternative metal, alternative rock
- Years active: 1995–1996
- Label: Zoo Entertainment
- Past members: Ken Andrews; Greg Edwards; Paul D'Amour; Chris Pitman

Replicants was an American rock band, consisting of Ken Andrews, Paul D'Amour, Greg Edwards, and Chris Pitman, which has been on hiatus since 1996. The group has only released one album, a self-titled cover album, in 1995. The band's name comes from the verb "replicate", alluding to the band's status as "a tribute band".

== Origin ==
Some months after Paul D'Amour left Tool, where he had played the role of bass player, he joined Chris Pitman, a keyboardist, and Failure members Ken Andrews and Greg Edwards. The four decided to restrict their work to covering songs by famous bands active in the 1970s and ‘80s.

== 1996 ==
During the months of 1996, the band decided to follow different paths. Ken went on to perform as a solo artist, while Chris, Greg, and Paul joined Brad Laner of the band Medicine to form Lusk, which put out one album, Free Mars. The three have now moved on to other projects.

== Discography ==
- 1995: Replicants (Zoo Entertainment)
