= Eels So Good: Essential Eels, Vol. 2 (2007–2020) =

Greatest hits album by Eels
- Released: December 15, 2023
- Recorded: 2007–2020
- Genre: Indie rock
- Length: 71:13
- Label: E Works; PIAS
- Producer: E (all recordings); Mickey Petralia (The Deconstruction recordings)

Eels chronology
Extreme Witchcraft (2022)	Eels So Good: Essential Eels, Vol. 2 (2007–2020) (2023)	Eels Time! (2024)

“Everyone should have at least three Christmas songs in their catalog. I’m sorry it took me so long.”

— E on lead single "Christmas, Why You Gotta Do Me Like This?"

Eels So Good: Essential Eels, Vol. 2 (2007–2020) is a 2023 greatest hits album for American indie rock band Eels. It follows 2008's Meet the Eels: Essential Eels, Vol. 1 (1996–2006) and received positive reviews from critics.

== Reception ==
Editors at AllMusic rated this album 4 out of 5 stars, with critic Mark Deming writing that "Mark Oliver Everett is a man capable of writing an irresistible pop tune when he feels like it. He also seems to think that's a rather empty pursuit, and he prefers to twist his melodies and production into more challenging forms as he ponders his neuroses in song." and that on this compilation, "Everett sets aside his essential duality and shares 20 tracks that, for the most part, focus on the gentler and more engaging side of his personality". In American Songwriter, Hal Horowitz scored this a 3.5 out of 5, calling it a "generous 72-minute compilation", with "plenty of compelling indie pop/rock". In The Irish Times, Tony Clayton-Lea scored this release 3.5 out of 5 stars, writing that "although it might not have the cumulative punch of their first [greatest hits compilation], no one could deny that the songs are anything less than their usual eerily charming selves" and summed up "amid the unforced individualism are measures of poignancy and emotional depth that make Everett’s songs a trove to repeatedly dig your hands into".

== Track listing ==
All songs written by E, except where noted.

1. "Fresh Blood" (E, Koool G Murder) (from Hombre Lobo) – 4:27
2. "That Look You Give That Guy" (E, Murder) (from Hombre Lobo) – 4:15
3. "A Line in the Dirt" (from End Times) – 3:30
4. "Little Bird" (from End Times) – 2:36
5. "Spectacular Girl" (from Tomorrow Morning) – 3:15
6. "I Like the Way This Is Going" (from Tomorrow Morning) – 2:35
7. "Peach Blossom" (The Chet, E, Murder) (from Wonderful, Glorious) – 4:02
8. "Wonderful, Glorious" (The Chet, E, Knuckles, Murder) (from Wonderful, Glorious) – 3:42
9. "Where I'm From" (E, P-Boo) (from The Cautionary Tales of Mark Oliver Everett) – 2:46
10. "Mistakes of My Youth" (The Chet, E) (from The Cautionary Tales of Mark Oliver Everett) – 4:56
11. "The Deconstruction" (E, Murder) (from The Deconstruction) – 4:12
12. "Today Is the Day" (E, P-Boo) (from The Deconstruction) – 3:02
13. "You Are the Shining Light" (E, Murder) (from The Deconstruction) – 3:38
14. "Are We Alright Again" (E, Murder) (from Earth to Dora) – 3:43
15. "Earth to Dora" (The Chet, E) (from Earth to Dora) – 3:41
16. "Royal Pain" (from the motion picture Shrek the Third) – 2:29
17. "Man Up" (from the motion picture Yes Man) – 3:58
18. "Man I Keep Trying" (The Chet, E) (from the motion picture Prisoner’s Daughter, previously unreleased) – 3:38
19. "Jazz Hands, Part I" (previously unreleased) – 3:12
20. "Christmas, Why You Gotta Do Me Like This" (previously unreleased) – 3:36

== Personnel ==
Hombre Lobo
Eels

- Derek "Knuckles" Brown – drums
- E – vocals and guitar, production
- Kelly "Koool G Murder" Logsdon – bass guitar, recording and mixing

Technical personnel

- Dan "Huevos Grande" Hersch, Digiprep Mastering – mastering
- Dan Pinder – recording and mixing

End Times
Eels

- E – vocals, guitars, bass guitar, harmonica, piano, Optigan, Hammond B3, banjo, pump organ, Vox Continental, drums, percussion, production
- Butch – drums on "A Line in the Dirt"
- Koool G Murder – bass, guitar, recording
- Wayne Bergeron – French horn, horns
- Chris Bleth – horns
- Andy Martin – horns

Technical personnel

- Robert Carranza – recording, mixing on "A Line in the Dirt"
- Jim Lang – recording and horn arrangements on "A Line in the Dirt"

Tomorrow Morning

- The Amy Davies Choir – harmony vocals
- E – vocals, guitars, bass guitar, harmonica, piano, Optigan, Hammond B3 organ, banjo, harmonium, Vox Continental organ, drums, percussion, and production
- Knuckles – drums
- Koool G Murder – bass guitar, guitar, recording and mixing
- Tomorrow Morning Orchestra – horns

Wonderful, Glorious
Eels

- The Chet – guitar
- E – vocals, guitar, production
- Knuckles – drums
- Koool G Murder – bass guitar
- Mike "P-Boo" Sawitzke – guitar

The Cautionary Tales of Mark Oliver Everett
Eels

- The Chet
- E
- Knuckles
- Koool G Murder
- P-Boo

with Professor Snatchmo

The Deconstruction
Eels

- E – guitar, vocals, production
- Koool G Murder – bass guitar
- P-Boo – guitar, bass guitar, keyboards, drums
- with The Deconstruction Orchestra & Choir

Earth to Dora
Eels

- The Chet – guitar, recording
- E – guitar, vocals, production
- Knuckles – drums
- Koool G Murder – bass guitar, recording, mixing
- P-Boo – guitar, recording

The band is accompanied by the Earth to Dora Orchestra & Choir, made up of unnamed musicians.

Technical personnel

- Dan Hersch – mastering

Compilation personnel

- Gus Black – photography
- Autumn DeWilde – photography
- Piper Ferguson – photography
- Charlie Lightening – photographyGus Black
- Rocky Schenck – photography

== See also ==
- 2023 in American music
- List of 2023 albums
