= McAllen Veterans Memorial Stadium =

Football stadium in McAllen, Texas

DQ Fan Field at Memorial Stadium
- McAllen Stadium
- Interactive map of DQ Fan Field at Memorial Stadium
- Former names: McAllen Veterans Memorial Stadium (1971-1981, 1986-2018) Palm Bowl (1981-1985)
- Address: 2155 North Bicentennial Boulevard; McAllen,Texas; United States
- Location: 2155 North Bicentennial Boulevard, McAllen, Texas 78501
- Coordinates: 26.2238°N 98.2372°W
- Owner: McAllen Independent School District
- Capacity: 13,500
- Surface: Artificial turf

Construction
- Opened: 1976
- Renovated: 2017

Tenants
- McAllen High School (UIL); James "Nikki" Rowe High School (UIL); McAllen Memorial High School (UIL); Palm Bowl (1978–1979, 1981–1985)

DQ Fan Field at McAllen Veterans Memorial Stadium is a high school football stadium in McAllen, Texas, United States. It has been used for college and high school football and soccer games and track and field meets. The stadium contains a full track and full-color video scoreboard. It is owned and operated by McAllen Independent School District, and is the home stadium for the football teams from McAllen High School, James "Nikki" Rowe High School, and McAllen Memorial High School. Memorial Stadium is the largest stadium in the Rio Grande Valley.

From 1978 to 1985, the stadium played host to the Palm Bowl. The game decided the NAIA Football National Championship in 1978 and 1979, and the NCAA Division II Football Championship from 1981 through 1985. The bowl game was not played in 1980.

McAllen veterans memorial stadium is also used for the McAllen holiday parade.

McAllen Veterans Memorial Stadium is among the largest high school football stadiums by capacity in Texas:
