= Lamar Academy =

Location
- McAllen, Texas; United States; 26.2130°N 98.2289°W

Information
- Established: 2001
- School district: McAllen Independent School District
- Staff: 23.99 (FTE)
- Grades: 9-12
- Enrollment: 121 (2017-18)
- Student to teacher ratio: 5.04
- Colors: Aqua and Gold
- Mascot: Phoenix
- Nickname: IB, IB at Lamar Academy
- Website: lamar.mcallenisd.org/o/lamar

Lamar Academy is an alternative education school in McAllen, Texas. A part of the McAllen Independent School District, it includes an International Baccalaureate program and Options in Education High School. It is available to any student whose home school is either McAllen Memorial High School, McAllen High School, or James "Nikki" Rowe High School
