= Houston Elementary School =

Houston Elementary School may refer to:

- Sam Houston Elementary School, McAllen, Texas, in the McAllen Independent School District
- Houston Elementary School, Talladega, Alabama, in Talladega City School District
- Houston Elementary School, Visalia, California, in Visalia Unified School District
- Henry H. Houston Elementary School, Philadelphia, Pennsylvania, in School District of Philadelphia
- Houston Elementary School, Spartanburg, South Carolina, in Spartanburg County School District
- Houston (Josephine Houston) Elementary School, Austin, Texas, in Austin Independent School District
- Charles H. Houston Elementary School, Washington, D.C., one of District of Columbia Public Schools
