= Where I'm At =

Where I'm At may refer to:

- "Where I'm At", song from Live at Royal Albert Hall (Eels album)
- "Where I'm At", song from H.F.M. 2 (The Hunger for More 2)
- "Where I'm At", song by Master Shortie
