= Juan Seguín Elementary School =

Juan Seguín Elementary School may refer to:

- Juan Seguín Elementary School - Fort Bend County, Texas - Fort Bend Independent School District
- Juan Seguín Elementary School - Houston, Texas - Houston Independent School District
- Juan Seguín Elementary School - McAllen, Texas - McAllen Independent School District
- Juan Seguín Elementary School - Mission, Texas - La Joya Independent School District
