= Baby Let's Make It Real =

"Baby Let’s Make It Real"

Single by Eels

from the album Earth to Dora
- B-side: "Who You Say You Are"
- Released: September 1, 2020
- Recorded: 2020
- Studio: The Compound, Los Feliz, California, U.S.; The Pie, Pasadena, California, U.S.
- Venue: Los Feliz
- Genre: Indie rock
- Length: 3:55
- Label: E Works Records
- Songwriters: E; Koool G.Murder
- Producer: E

Eels singles chronology
"Bone Dry" (2018)	"Baby Let’s Make It Real" (2020)	"Are We Alright Again" (2020)

"Baby Let’s Make It Real" is a song by American rock band Eels. It was released as the first single from their 13th studio album, 2020’s Earth to Dora.

“Who You Say You Are” was the B-side on a limited edition 7-inch single. “Here’s a way to forget your troubles for three minutes and 55 seconds.” E implored his fans “Listen to this song and think about my problems instead.” Laura Barton in The Independent described the double side track ‘Who You Say You Are’ as “particularly arresting” because “it captures the very particular woe of the songwriter, writing a song about a certain someone only later to no longer feel so certain about them.” In interview E agreed with Barton about this “It’s kind of a song about writing a song in a way...It’s trying to tell myself to be a little more cautious sometimes.” Australia’s scenestr describe ’Who You Say You Are' as a wonderful, three-minute release of charming, sparkling, acoustic indie pop.

== Production ==
Recorded at the band’s studio in Los Feliz, California, Baby Let’s Make It Real was made available to stream on 11 August 2020, with the record available from 1 September 2020. The song was the first new piece of Eels material since the release of their April 2018 album ‘The Deconstruction’.

== Reception ==
According to Stereogum it is a “lush, classicist piece of extremely California pop music. It’s full of impeccably recorded keyboards and (I think) mellotrons, and there’s some real syncopation in its drums.” Back Seat Mafia describe “his voice gravelly immaculate. his voice gravelly immaculate. There’s some nicely scuzzy guitar work too.”

The Independent mention the “sultry piano” in the track. It was reviewed by Australian Broadcasting Corporation as “a mellow piano pop song about fortifying new love. It's got E's characteristic strained, shaky voice, plus a fuzzy guitar solo. It's a slow jam like we've come to expect from Eels.” They also noted “Mark Oliver Everett, a.k.a. E, is a child of the 90s alternative rock boom, but he's always flown under whatever radar picked up some of his contemporaries, like Beck and Elliott Smith. Clash commented on how the song is a “dramatic plot twist” from Eels often miserablist style and strangely upbeat. Danzende Beren noted “an infectious chorus that does not take much time to settle in your head. EELS clearly hasn't forgotten how to make a catchy song that sounds simple, fragile and honest at the same time. It feels a bit richer in sound and with more bluesy influences the band rounds off this single completely. QROmag describe it as “relaxed and enjoyable”.

Music Talkers said “Let’s Make It Real marked a triumphant return for Everett, who under the Eels band name has released some dark albums charting his own intense personal pain and loss since the group’s superb debut album Beautiful Freak captivated legions of listeners back in the mid-1990s.” Buzzbands LA compared it to life pre-COVID-19 “Do you remember — back in pre-pandemic times when we were free to move about the country — the simple pleasure of randomly running into an old friend? That’s what it felt like this week to hear Eels’ new single “Baby Let’s Make It Real,” They added “The effortless melody, the dirty guitar solo, the lovably raspy voice of Mark Oliver Everett, a.k.a. E, who first made our all-time list nearly a quarter-century ago … Can we go back to what used to feel real?”
