= Prisoner's Daughter =

2022 film by Catherine Hardwicke

- Theatrical release poster
- Directed by: Catherine Hardwicke
- Written by: Mark Bacci
- Produced by: Sam Okun; Marina Grasic; David Haring
- Starring: Kate Beckinsale; Brian Cox; Christopher Convery; Jon Huertas; Ernie Hudson; Tyson Ritter
- Cinematography: Noah Greenberg
- Edited by: Glen Scantlebury; Stephanie Kaznocha
- Music by: Nora Kroll-Rosenbaum
- Production companies: Capstone Global; Oakhurst Entertainment; Smokn Productions; Pasaca Entertainment; Great Point Media
- Distributed by: Vertical Entertainment
- Release dates: September 14, 2022 (TIFF); June 30, 2023 (United States)
- Running time: 100 minutes
- Country: United States
- Language: English

Prisoner's Daughter is a 2022 American drama film directed by Catherine Hardwicke, written by Mark Bacci, and starring Kate Beckinsale and Brian Cox. The film premiered at the 2022 Toronto International Film Festival, and was released in the United States on June 30, 2023, by Vertical Entertainment.

== Plot ==
The film centers on an imprisoned man's attempts to reconnect with his adult daughter and teenaged grandson after being diagnosed with terminal pancreatic cancer while serving 12 years in prison.

== Cast ==
- Kate Beckinsale as Maxine MacLeary
- Brian Cox as Max MacLeary
- Christopher Convery as Ezra MacLeary
- Jon Huertas as Joseph
- Ernie Hudson as Hank
- Tyson Ritter as Tyler

== Production ==
The film was produced by Sam Okun, Marina Grasic, and David Haring. In August 2021, Deadline announced that Tyson Ritter was joining the cast alongside Beckinsale and Cox.

== Release ==
The film had its world premiere on September 14, 2022, at the 2022 Toronto International Film Festival. In April 2023, Vertical Entertainment acquired distribution rights to the film, and set it for release on June 30, 2023.

== Reception ==
On the review aggregator website Rotten Tomatoes, 43% of 54 critics' reviews are positive, with an average rating of 5.3/10. The website's consensus reads: "Prisoner's Daughter has an outstanding cast, but they're overwhelmed by a blandly busy story that offers few surprises." Metacritic, which uses a weighted average, assigned the film a score of 48 out of 100, based on 14 critics, indicating "mixed or average" reviews.

Lovia Gyarkye of The Hollywood Reporter gave the film a mixed review, praising its cast and direction while criticizing its uneven screenplay, pivot from the drama to the action genre in the second act, and for not adequately fleshing out its characters. Wendy Ide of Screen Daily wrote that "There are very few surprises in this formulaic domestic drama, but there are pleasures to be had in watching."

Robert Daniels, in a review for RogerEbert.com, gave the film a mostly negative review, writing that it "disappointingly undermines its own themes and characters at every turn."

Marya E. Gates of The Playlist was critical of the film, stating that the performances of Cox and Beckinsale were some of the film's only highlights.

== See also ==
- Eels So Good: Essential Eels, Vol. 2 (2007–2020), an album with a song from this soundtrack
