= Fresh Blood (song) =

Single by Eels

from the album Hombre Lobo
- A-side: "Fresh Blood"
- B-side: "Devil's Dog"
- Released: April 26, 2009
- Recorded: 2009
- Genre: Rock
- Length: 4:23
- Label: Vagrant, E Works
- Songwriter: E
- Producers: E, Kelley Logsdon

Eels singles chronology
"Hey Man (Now You're Really Living)" (2005)	"Fresh Blood" (2009)	"A Line in the Dirt" (2010)

My Timing Is Off
- Cover to the British "My Timing Is Off" single, featuring "Fresh Blood" as a B-Side

"Fresh Blood" is a song by American rock band Eels. It was released as the first single from their 2009 album Hombre Lobo.

== Content ==
The song is about a werewolf who desires "fresh blood". E has described the song as a sequel to "I Want to Protect You".

== Release ==
On March 31, 2009, the band made the track available on Spinner.com, explaining that the song would be the lead single for the album.

A music video directed by Jesse Dylan premiered on April 29, 2009.

A 7" single was released on May 18, 2009, in the United Kingdom featuring the album track "My Timing Is Off" as an A-side backed with "Fresh Blood". Both singles were made available on the iTunes Store.

== Legacy ==
The song was featured in the sixth-season episode "Legacy" of the TV series Rescue Me and the end credits of the third-season episode "Fresh Blood" of the series True Blood. The song was also featured as the opening theme for the first season of HBO's documentary series The Jinx (titled The Jinx: The Life and Deaths of Robert Durst) and recently as the opening and closing theme to Amazon's Original series Sneaky Pete. "Bone Dry" from the 2018 album The Deconstruction was written as a sequel to this song.. It also appears in the fourth episode of the third-season of the TV series Yellowjackets (TV series).

== Track listing ==
All songs written by E

Digital download

1. "Fresh Blood" – 4:23
2. "Devil's Dog" – 3:42

7"

1. "My Timing Is Off" – 2:57
2. "Fresh Blood" – 4:23
