= James N. Rowe =

United States Army officer (1938–1989)

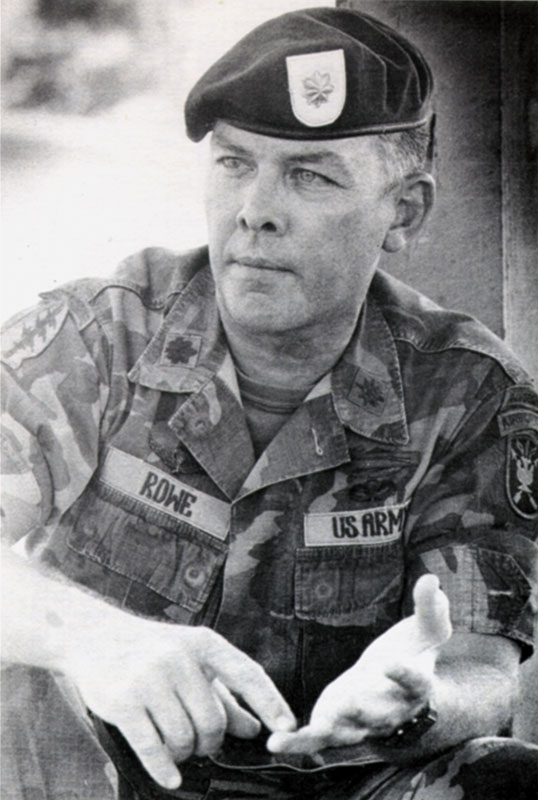
- Born: February 8, 1938; McAllen, Texas, U.S.
- Died: April 21, 1989 (aged 51); Quezon City, Philippines
- Burial place: Arlington National Cemetery
- Military career
- Allegiance: United States
- Branch: United States Army
- Service years: 1960–1974; 1981–1989
- Rank: Colonel
- Nickname: "Nick"
- Commands: Army Division, Joint U.S. Military Advisory Group
- Conflicts: Vietnam War; Filipino Insurgency
- Awards: Silver Star; Legion of Merit; Bronze Star Medal (2); Purple Heart (2)
- Other work: Author

James Nicholas "Nick" Rowe (February 8, 1938 – April 21, 1989) was a United States Army officer and one of only 34 American prisoners of war to escape captivity during the Vietnam War. Colonel Rowe was credited with developing the rigorous US Army Survival, Evasion, Resistance and Escape (SERE) training program taught to high-risk military personnel (such as Special Operations Forces and aircrews) and the U.S. Army doctrine which institutionalizes these techniques and principles to be followed by captured personnel.

In 1989, Rowe was assassinated by a unit of the New People's Army in the Philippines called the Alex Boncayao Brigade.

== Personal life ==
Rowe was born in McAllen, Texas, on February 8, 1938, to Lee Delavan and Florence (Survillo) Rowe. He grew up in McAllen, joining his local DeMolay chapter, and graduated from McAllen High School in 1956 before leaving for the United States Military Academy at West Point, New York. His older brother Richard had also attended West Point, but died a few months before graduation in 1944.

On December 27, 1969, Rowe married Jane Rowe, whom he later divorced. His second wife was Susan. He had two daughters, Deborah and Christina, from his first marriage and two sons, Alex and Brian, from his second marriage. His first wife, Jane Rowe, died in 2022 in Richmond, Virginia, after dealing with a prolonged illness.

== Military service ==
Rowe graduated from West Point in 1960 and was commissioned as a second lieutenant in the United States Army. In 1963, First Lieutenant Rowe was sent to the Republic of Vietnam and assigned as executive officer of Detachment A-23, 5th Special Forces Group, a 12-man "A-team". Located at Tan Phu in An Xuyen Province, A-23 organized and advised a Civilian Irregular Defense Group camp in the Mekong Delta region of Vietnam.

=== Prisoner of war ===
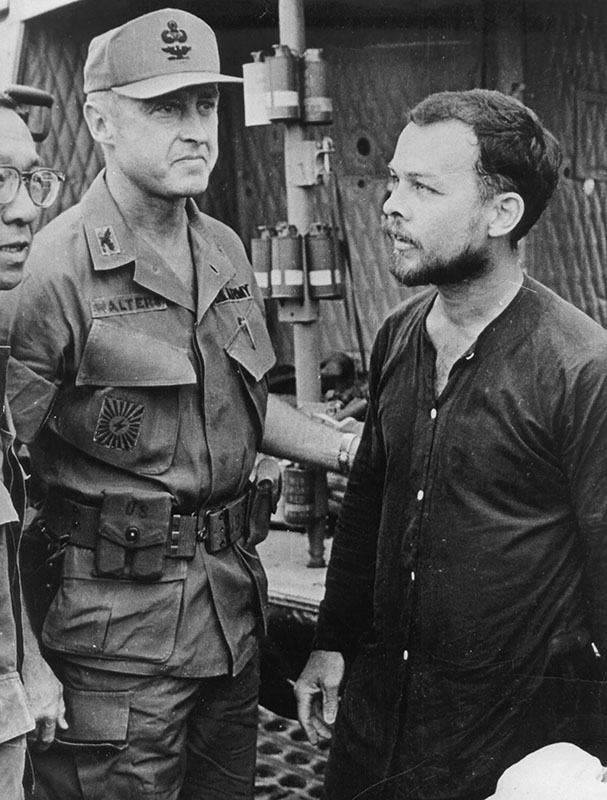
Rowe, shortly after his escape

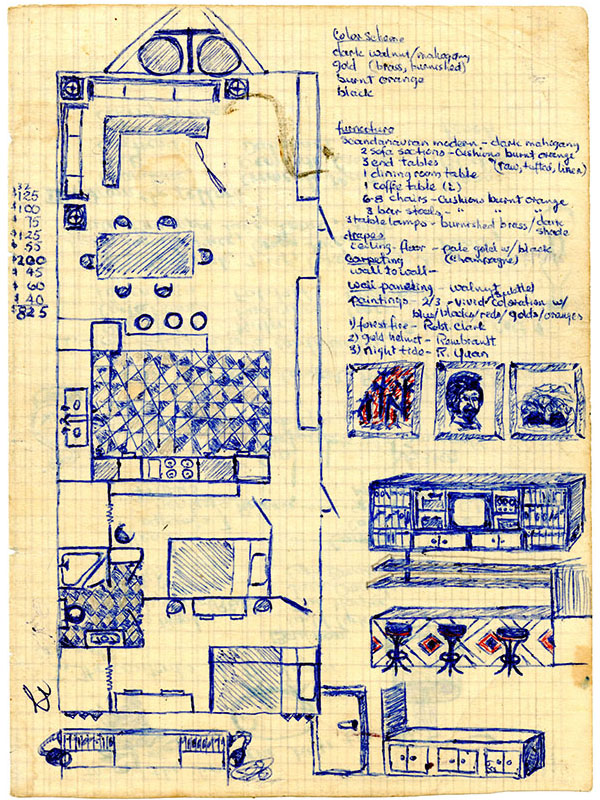
Page from Rowe's diary while a POW. Pictured is a sketch of the floorplan of the "Hacienda del Sol", an imaginary resort he came up with to lift his spirits.

On October 29, 1963, after only three months in country, Rowe was captured by Viet Cong elements along with Captain Humberto "Rocky" R. Versace and Sergeant Daniel L. Pitzer while on an operation to drive a Viet Cong unit out of the village of Le Coeur. Rowe states that the VC were a main force unit due to his observations of their equipment.

Rowe was separated from his fellow Green Berets and spent 62 months in captivity with only brief encounters with fellow American POWs. Rowe was held in the U Minh Forest, better known as the "Forest of Darkness," in extreme southern Vietnam. During most of his five years in captivity Rowe was held in a 3 by 4 by 6 foot (0.91 m × 1.22 m × 1.83 m) bamboo cage. As an intelligence officer, Rowe possessed vital information about the disposition of defenses around the CIDG camps, the locations of mine fields, identities of friendly Vietnamese, and unit locations and strengths. Rowe had left his West Point ring at home in the United States, and he told his captors that he was a draftee engineer charged with building schools and other civil affairs projects. The Viet Cong interrogated him unsuccessfully. They gave him some engineering problems to solve and Rowe, relying on the basic instruction in engineering he had received at West Point, successfully maintained his deception.

Rowe's deceptive cover was blown, though, when the Viet Cong managed to obtain a list of American high-value prisoners-of-war (POWs), and his name was in the list, identifying him as an intelligence officer. This enraged the VC, prompting them to order his execution.

Rowe was then led deep into the jungle to be shot. When his would-be executioners were distracted by a flight of American helicopters, he overpowered his guard, escaped, and flagged down a UH-1 helicopter piloted by Major David E. Thompson. He was rescued on December 31, 1968. Rowe had been promoted to major during captivity.

In 1971, he authored the book Five Years to Freedom, an account of his years as a prisoner of war.

Five Years to Freedom

=== Survival course ===
In 1981, Rowe was recalled to active duty as a lieutenant colonel to design and build a course based upon his experience as a POW. Survival, Evasion, Resistance, and Escape (SERE) is now a requirement for graduation from the U.S. Army Special Forces Qualification Course. SERE is taught at the Colonel James "Nick" Rowe Training Compound at Camp Mackall, North Carolina. It is considered by many to be the most important advanced training in the special operations field. Navy, Air Force, and Marine Special Operations personnel all attend variations of this course taught by their respective services.

=== Support of Philippine counterinsurgency ===
By 1987, Colonel Rowe was assigned as the chief of the Army division of the Joint U.S. Military Advisory Group (JUSMAG), providing counterinsurgency training for the Armed Forces of the Philippines. Working closely with the Central Intelligence Agency and intelligence organizations of the Republic of the Philippines, he was involved in its nearly decade-long program to penetrate the New People's Army (NPA), the communist insurgency that threatened to overthrow the Philippines' government.

By February 1989, Rowe had acquired intelligence information which indicated that the NPA was planning a major terrorist act. He warned Washington that a high-profile figure was about to be assassinated and that he himself was second or third on the assassination list. Around 07:00 hours on April 21, 1989, as he was being driven to work at the JoJUSMAG headquarters in an armored limousine, Rowe's vehicle was hit by gunfire from a .45 caliber pistol and an M16 rifle near a corner of Tomas Morato Street and Timog Avenue in Quezon City. Twenty-one shots hit the vehicle; one round entered through an unarmored portion of the vehicle frame and struck Rowe in the head, killing him instantly, while chauffeur Joaquin Vinuya was wounded. A day after the assassination, the NPA claimed responsibility through a letter signed by its commander, Romulo Kintanar, accusing Rowe of being a "direct participant" in President Corazon Aquino's counterinsurgency campaign.

Filipino nationals Juanito T. Itaas (principal) and Donato B. Continente (accomplice) were convicted by a Philippine court in 1991 and sentenced to life imprisonment for the murder of Rowe, and 10 to 17 years for the attempted murder of his driver, Joaquin Vinuya. In 2000, the Supreme Court of the Philippines affirmed the convictions, but reduced Continente's sentence to 14 years, concluding that he was acting as an accomplice, not as a principal. On June 28, 2005, Continente was released from prison. On January 8, 2022, Itaas was released from prison as he was found to have completed the service of his sentence through the Good Conduct Time Allowance Law under Republic Act 10592.

James N. Rowe was buried at Arlington National Cemetery, in Arlington, Virginia.

== Politics ==
Rowe was a staunch conservative and a strong critic of George McGovern in the 1972 presidential campaign. He ran as a Republican for the office of Texas comptroller in 1974, but was easily defeated by Democrat Bob Bullock in a strongly Democratic year because of the Watergate scandal. Bullock received 1,099,599 votes (71.6%) to Rowe's 419,657 (27.3%). A third-party candidate earned the remaining 16,383 (1%) votes. Rowe did not run for office again and Bullock became a two-term lieutenant governor.

== Awards and decorations ==
=== Silver Star ===
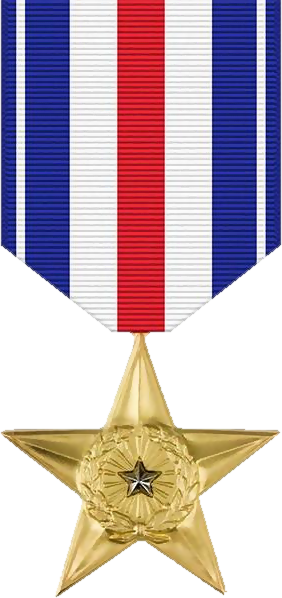

Citation:

The President of the United States of America, authorized by Act of Congress, July 8, 1918 (amended by act of July 25, 1963), takes pleasure in presenting the Silver Star to Major (Field Artillery) James Nicholas "Nick" Rowe (ASN: 0-91033), United States Army, for gallantry in action on 31 December 1968, while a prisoner of the Viet Cong in the U Minh Forest of South Vietnam. During the period 22 to 31 December 1968, after more than five years in Viet Cong prison camps, Major Rowe was forced by his captors to move at least twice daily to avoid friendly airstrikes. On 31 December at approximately 0900 hours, two helicopter gunships began firing into an area approximately 300 meters from his location. The guard detail consisted of one Viet Cong cadreman and five guards, one of whom was assigned to remain with Major Rowe at all times. The guard detail, while monitoring a radio, learned that South Vietnamese infantrymen were searching the terrain nearby. Becoming frightened, the guards moved Major Rowe into a large field of reeds, hoping to evade the infantry force. Major Rowe realized that if he were to escape, he must first get away from some of his guards, so he tricked them into splitting into smaller groups in order to exfiltrate the area. Major Rowe persuaded his one remaining guard that they were being surrounded and kept him moving in a circle through the dense underbrush. While doing so, Major Rowe was able to remove the magazine from the weapon slung across his guard's back. Finding a club, he overpowered his guard, knocking him unconscious, seized his radio, and moved 200 meters into a grassy area. At great personal risk he quickly cleared a section and signaled one of the circling helicopters, which landed and picked him up. His first action after rescue was to request permission to re-enter the area with combat troops and to continue the fight based upon his intimate knowledge of the area. Major Rowe's burning determination to escape, undiminished after five years of intimidation and deprivation, his clear-headedness in formulating an effective plan, and his audacity in executing it successfully, reflect the highest credit on his professionalism and extraordinary courage and are in keeping with the highest traditions of the military service.

=== Commendations ===
COL Rowe was awarded the following awards throughout his career:

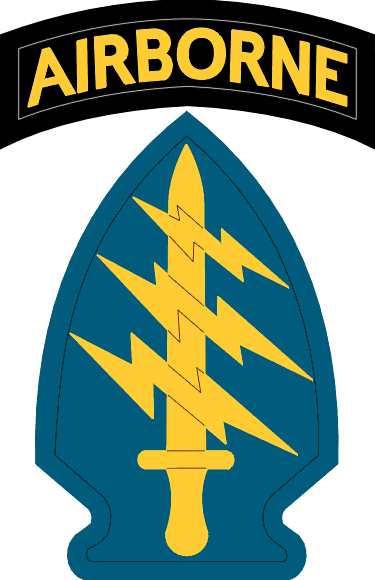

Badge	Combat Infantryman Badge			Special Forces Tab; Ranger Tab; United States Army Special Forces; Combat Service Identification Badge
1st Row	Silver Star			Special Forces Tab; Ranger Tab; United States Army Special Forces; Combat Service Identification Badge
2nd Row	Legion of Merit	Bronze Star with "V" device and 1 Oak leaf cluster	Purple Heart with 1 Oak leaf cluster	Special Forces Tab; Ranger Tab; United States Army Special Forces; Combat Service Identification Badge
3rd Row	Meritorious Service Medal	Prisoner of War Medal	National Defense Service Medal	Special Forces Tab; Ranger Tab; United States Army Special Forces; Combat Service Identification Badge
4th Row	Armed Forces Expeditionary Medal	Vietnam Service Medal with 1 silver and 3 bronze Campaign stars	Army Service Ribbon	Special Forces Tab; Ranger Tab; United States Army Special Forces; Combat Service Identification Badge
5th Row	Army Overseas Service Ribbon	Vietnamese Gallantry Cross with 1 Bronze star	Vietnam Campaign Medal with "60-" device	Special Forces Tab; Ranger Tab; United States Army Special Forces; Combat Service Identification Badge
Badge	Master Parachutist Badge			Special Forces Tab; Ranger Tab; United States Army Special Forces; Combat Service Identification Badge
Unit awards	Army Presidential Unit Citation with 3 Oak leaf clusters	Joint Meritorious Unit Award	Vietnamese Gallantry Cross Unit Citation (U.S. Army version)	Special Forces Tab; Ranger Tab; United States Army Special Forces; Combat Service Identification Badge

== Memorials ==
- James "Nikki" Rowe High School and a major street, Col. Rowe Blvd., formerly known as 2nd St. in McAllen, Texas, are named in his memory.
- The JROTC Drill Teams (Rowe's Rifles, Rowe's Rangers) and Shooting Team (Rowe's Rangers) of McAllen High School were named in his honor well before he died.
- A training facility, Rowe Hall, at the US Army Intelligence Center and School, Fort Huachuca, Arizona, was named in his honor.
- A training facility, Rowe Hall, Consolidated Training Facility (aka ISOFAC) at 5th Special Forces Group (Airborne), Fort Campbell, Kentucky, is named in honor of Col. "Nick" Rowe.
- Having been a member of the Order of DeMolay as a teenager, he was recognized with both the DeMolay Legion of Honor, the highest honor DeMolay confers and was inducted into the International DeMolay Hall of Fame.
- An Order of Knighthood priory of DeMolay International in the state of Florida is named in his memory.
- The obstacle course on Camp MacKall, arguably the hardest obstacle course in the Army, is named the "Nasty Nick".
- An office facility, the Rowe Building, of the Joint United States Military Assistance Group – Philippines, US Embassy, Manila, was named in his honor.
- The Colonel James N. "Nick" Rowe Memorial, located in Veteran's Memorial Park in Union Beach, New Jersey, was dedicated on October 9, 2004, by friends, classmates from the West Point Class of 1960, and comrades-in arms. Among the attendees were Major General Ted Crowley (a classmate), Ross Perot, and Colonel Rowe's widow and children.
- The Defense Intelligence Agency in Charlottesville, Virginia, dedicated a building on May 2, 2014, in his honor
