= Live at Royal Albert Hall (Eels album) =

2015 live album by Eels

Eels: Royal Albert Hall

Live album and DVD by Eels
- Released: April 14, 2015
- Recorded: June 30, 2014
- Venues: Royal Albert Hall, London, England
- Genre: Indie rock
- Length: 83:59
- Labels: E Works, PIAS
- Producer: E

Eels chronology
The Cautionary Tales of Mark Oliver Everett (2014)	Eels: Royal Albert Hall (2015)	The Complete DreamWorks Albums (2015)

Eels: Royal Albert Hall is a live album by Eels, released as 2-Disc CD and 3-Disc clear purple vinyl packages, both with a DVD, on April 14, 2015. The recording is from London's Royal Albert Hall, June 30, 2014. It is the third Eels live DVD.

== Reception ==
Professional ratings
Review scores
Source	Rating
AllMusic	4/5 stars

Editors at AllMusic rated this album 4 out of 5 stars, with critic Thom Jurek writing this recording is "a musical tour through the band's catalog" and a "guided tour through the dark, often heartbreakingly honest complexities of [band leader Mark Oliver Everett] played with mostly sparse elegance by the Eels", wrapping that "most of these interpretations are essential". At Drowned in Sound, Joe Goggins scored this release an 8 out of 10 and stated that this recording "is bursting at the seams with superb reinterpretations of some real classics". A brief review in Mojo by John Bungey called Live at Royal Albert Hall "two CDs plus a DVD of Mark Everett’s quietly thrilling pop noir" and recommended the DVD release, rating it 3 out of 5 stars. Writing at PopMatters, Matt James rated this album an 8 out of 10, calling it a "soul-stirring" work and praises Everett's ability to mix sadness and joy, summing up that "many will find it a richly rewarding, comforting, and quietly triumphant celebration from one of America’s finest underdog songwriters". Jake Kennedy of Record Collector stated that the "consummate musicians" manage to "avoiding potential cliché throughout".

== CD track listing ==
All songs written by E, except where noted.

1. "Where I'm At" – 2:22
2. "When You Wish Upon a Star" (Leigh Harline, Ned Washington) – 1:55
3. "The Morning" – 1:49
4. "Parallels" – 3:07
5. "Addressing the Royal Audience" – 3:32
6. "Mansions of Los Feliz" – 2:55
7. "My Timing Is Off" – 2:58
8. "A Line in the Dirt" – 3:34
9. "Where I'm From" (E, P-Boo) – 3:17
10. "It's a Motherfucker" – 2:24
11. "Lockdown Hurricane" – 3:33
12. "A Daisy Through Concrete" – 3:15
13. Introducing the band – 3:25
14. "Grace Kelly Blues" – 3:09
15. "Fresh Feeling" – 3:29
16. "I Like Birds" – 2:33
17. "My Beloved Monster" – 3:10
18. "Gentlemen's Choice" (E, P-Boo) – 2:49
19. "Mistakes of My Youth"/"Wonderful, Glorious" (The Chet, E, Knuckles) – 6:01
20. "Where I'm Going" – 4:08

First Encore

21. "I Like The Way This Is Going" – 2:50
22. "Blinking Lights (For Me)" – 2:11
23. "Last Stop: This Town" – 4:01

Second Encore

24. "The Beginning" – 2:39
25. "Can't Help Falling in Love" (Hugo Peretti, Luigi Creatore, George David Weiss) – 2:34
26. "Turn On Your Radio" (Harry Nilsson) – 3:24

"Phantom" Encore (Played using Royal Albert Hall's pipe organ)

27. "Flyswatter" – 1:10
28. "The Sound of Fear" – 1:20

Eels: Royal Albert Hall

Video by Eels
- Released: April 14, 2015
- Recorded: June 30, 2014, Royal Albert Hall, London, England
- Genre: Indie rock
- Length: Unknown
- Language: English
- Labels: E Works, PIAS Recordings
- Director: Charlie Lightening
- Producer: E

== DVD track listing ==
1. "Where I'm At"
2. "When You Wish Upon a Star" (Leigh Harline, Ned Washington)
3. "The Morning"
4. "Parallels"
5. "Addressing the Royal Audience"
6. "Mansions of Los Feliz"
7. "My Timing Is Off"
8. "A Line in the Dirt"
9. "Where I'm From"
10. "It's a Motherfucker"
11. "Lockdown Hurricane"
12. "A Daisy Through Concrete"
13. "Introducing the Band"
14. "Grace Kelly Blues"
15. "Fresh Feeling"
16. "I Like Birds"
17. "My Beloved Monster"
18. "Gentlemen's Choice"
19. "Mistakes of My Youth"/"Wonderful, Glorious"
20. "Where I'm Going"

First Encore

1. "I Like The Way This Is Going"
2. "Blinking Lights (For Me)"
3. "Last Stop: This Town"

Second Encore

1. "The Beginning"
2. "Can't Help Falling in Love" (Hugo Peretti, Luigi Creatore, George David Weiss)
3. "Turn On Your Radio" (Harry Nilsson)

"Phantom" Encore (Played using Royal Albert Hall's pipe organ)

1. "Flyswatter"
2. "The Sound of Fear"

== Personnel ==
Eels

- E – vocals, guitar, and keyboards
- The Chet – pedal steel guitar, guitar, melodica
- P-Boo – guitar, trumpet, piano
- Royal Al – upright bass, bowed bass
- Knuckles – percussion

Production

- Recording Engineer: Kevin Vanbergen

DVD

- Charlie Lightening – direction
- Alejandro Reyes-Knight – creative production

== Charts ==
=== Weekly ===
Weekly chart performance for Live at Royal Albert Hall
Chart (2015)	Peak position
Austrian Albums (Ö3 Austria)	48
Belgian Albums (Ultratop Flanders)	7
Belgian Albums (Ultratop Wallonia)	63
Dutch Albums (Album Top 100)	29
French Albums (SNEP)	88
German Albums (Offizielle Top 100)	38
Irish Albums (IRMA)	48
Scottish Albums (Official Charts)	34
Spanish Albums (Promusicae)	94
Swiss Albums (Schweizer Hitparade)	36
UK Albums (Official Charts)	40
UK Independent Albums (Official Charts)	9

=== Year-end ===
Annual chart performance for Live at Royal Albert Hall
Chart (2015)	Position
Belgian Albums (Ultratop Flanders)	135
