= Rolando Cantú =

Mexican gridiron football player (born 1981)

No. 69
- Positions: Offensive tackle, Guard

Personal information
- Born: February 25, 1981 (age 45); Monterrey, Mexico
- Listed height: 6 ft 5 in (1.96 m)
- Listed weight: 348 lb (158 kg)

Career information
- High school: McAllen (McAllen, Texas, U.S.)
- College: ITESM
- NFL draft: 2004: undrafted

Career history
- Berlin Thunder (2004); Arizona Cardinals (2004–2006)

Awards and highlights
- 2× Mexican national champion (1999, 2002)
- Stats at Pro Football Reference

Rolando Roel Cantú (born February 25, 1981) is a Mexican former American football player who was a tackle for the Arizona Cardinals of the National Football League (NFL). He was the first Mexican football player trained in the Mexican collegiate system to become an active NFL player. Today, he is a broadcaster and promoter of the Cardinals and NFL in Mexico and U.S. Spanish media, working to develop talent in Mexico with camps and clinics for young people.

== Early life ==
Rolando Cantú was born on February 25, 1981, in Monterrey, Mexico, the youngest of seven children. While Cantú was still young, the family moved to border town Reynosa in neighbor state of Tamaulipas, so he could attended grade school at the U.S. town of McAllen, Texas, driven across the border every day. He grew up a fan of the Dallas Cowboys, watching games with his father on TV as the NFL has begun broadcasting games in the country's local stations.

He played various sports including American football with neighborhood friends as well as in Pop Warner, which Cantú recalls saying it's taken seriously in Mexico. He always was bigger than other kids his age, and had to show his birth certificate when signing up for baseball and football teams because of his size. Eventually, he decided he was too big and rough for soccer.

Because of age and talent, he didn't needed to work like his siblings at his father's meat market . In junior high school, he was on the team but did not plan originally on a career in sports, figuring he would work for his father at a latter date. But on his first day at McAllen High School, the school's defense coach asked why he hadn't joined the football team. Cantú replied that he wanted to earn money to buy a car, but the coach didn't accepted it, ordering practice that very day. Cantú took football more seriously at his sophomore year, and when he achieved junior moved to the offensive line. At age fifteen, he decided that he would play someday in the NFL.

== College career ==
Colleges like Texas Tech, Texas A&M, Miami (Fla.) and Oklahoma were among 40 schools that noticed him during his high school days and began to attempt to recruit him. However, he decided that he did not want to play college football in the United States. Instead, Cantú accepted a scholarship to play college football at the Monterrey Institute of Technology and Higher Studies in Mexico, a member of the ONEFA.

At that time, college football was a seven-year commitment, divided into three playing levels. Cantú, because of his size and talent was able skip the two lower levels and start as an 18-year-old at the highest level. He initially gained fame in Mexico with his stint with the Borregos Salvages (Wild Rams). Monterrey Tech won the 1999 national title during Cantú's first season, the first of four Mexican championship games during his time at Monterrey Tech. In 2000, Cantú decided to attend Texas A&M University-Kingsville as a foreign exchange student. In the spring and summer of 2001, he trained with their team with the aim of playing NCAA Division II football in the fall. Despite his obvious talent, the school did not offer him a scholarship, rather a loan. He turned this down as he still had the full scholarship at Monterrey Tech. He took a break from school for the 2001 season, spending the fall semester with his parents. Cantú returned to Monterrey Tec in 2002 with more confidence having competed at the US college level and well. He and the school won another national championship in 2002 before losing in 2003. With age and experience, Cantu finds it curious and even a little regrettable to take that offer over colleges in the United States.

On December 2, 2011, Cantú was honored as one of the 55 greatest players in program history during halftime of the national championship game at the Estadio Tecnológico.

== Professional career ==
His eligibility to play Mexican collegiate sports ended in 2003. There was an opportunity to try out for the NFL Europe league, but he almost did not make it. He had an accident with a double trailer which totaled the car he was driving to a tryout for NFL Europe. Under Mexican law, he should have stayed as the accident caused damage to city property. However, he called his then-girlfriend (now wife Carmen Valenzuela) who got to the scene before the police and told him to go to the tryout. She would take blame for the accident. He showed up an hour late to the tryout, but it earned him a tryout for central NFL Europe and a training camp in Tampa. He impressed in Tampa, earning a spot on the Berlin Thunder. He played in nine games for the Thunder.

The day after the Berlin Thunder won the World Bowl XII, he signed with the Arizona Cardinals of the NFL. As part of the NFL's first International Development Practice Squad, Cantú spent the 2004 season on the Cardinals practice squad. was with the team two season, 2005 and 2006, Cantu made his first and only NFL game appearance on January 1, 2006, against the Indianapolis Colts. that game, Cantú became the first Mexican player trained in the Mexican collegiate system to play professionally in the NFL.

Despite the importance of the game to Cantu personally, his family was not there to see it. His wife was with their then 3-month old and he decided the trip to Indianapolis was too far. He signed a one-year extension for 2006. On the fourth day of training camp, he torn a cartilage in his right knee, stepping over a towel. His meniscus needed micro fracture surgery, and he was put on injured reserve. During his recuperation, the coaching staff of the team changed and he was released in July 2006. He had to find a new team or retire, and chose the latter.

== Post-football career ==
Fortunately, Cantú has an outgoing personality and does public relations well. He became extremely popular with the Mexican and Mexican American communities on both sides of the border, with Mexican and other Spanish media covering his football career closely. Former Monterrey Tech coach Leopoldo Treviño remembered Cantu as big, fast and very happy. Offers to work with publicity agencies and promote products came soon after being recruited to the Cardinals. He signed a contract with the JWM publicity agency in Mexico which focuses on sport, and Gatorade signed him as a spokesperson for the Spanish-speaking community. Even after his short stint as an active player, he continued to be in demand for children's hospital visits. Instead of simply letting him go, the Cardinal offered him a position in administration. He is currently their manager of international business ventures and does commentary on the team's Spanish language radio broadcasts. He has provided commentary not only on Cardinals' games but also various Super Bowls and he helped to build the NFL's Spanish Radio Network.

Even before retiring, Cantú has worked to help other aspiring NFL players in Mexico, and has said that he does not want to be the last Mexican player in the league, starting football camps in Mexico as early as 2004. He serves as a quasi-ambassador for the Cardinals and the rest of the NFL in Mexico, using his contacts in Mexican universities to scout for talent. Since retiring, he has worked to set up summer football and cheerleading camps and clinics in various parts of Mexico, mostly in the north, working with the Cardinals, the NFL and his Rolando Cantú Foundation. The main goal is to find talent early and get the candidates college scholarships. Some of the camps bring in talent from various NFL teams to camps in various parts of Mexico. Mexico has become known for producing kickers but Cantu believes there is talent for other positions as well, it is just a matter of finding it. He does not regret pursuing the NFL or the shift into the business side of football since the injury, stating "I feel blessed."
