= Are We Alright Again =

Single by Eels

from the album Earth to Dora
- Released: September 16, 2020
- Recorded: 2020
- Studio: The Compound, Los Feliz, California, U.S.; The Pie, Pasadena, California, U.S.
- Genre: Indie rock
- Length: 3:43
- Label: E Works Records
- Songwriters: E; Koool G Murder
- Producer: E

Eels singles chronology
"Baby Let's Make It Real" (2020)	"Are We Alright Again" (2020)	"Anything for Boo" (2020)

"Are We Alright Again" is a song by American rock band Eels. It was released as a single from their 2020 album Earth to Dora.

"Are We Alright Again" had a music video made available from 11 November 2020 featuring the actor Jon Hamm in a Greg Barnes directed long single take. The video also featured appearances from Eels frontman E's co-stars Mike Mitchell and Eric Edelstein from the television show Love.

== Video ==
Rolling Stone reported that in the video for “the feel-good hit of the feel-worst year” was Jon Hamm, supposedly an Eels superfan in real life, appearing as a fan who puts headphones on to listen to the track and “becomes so absorbed by the music that he’s oblivious to the chaos happening behind him: Home invasion, the theft of all his possessions, and the assault of a friend who happens to stop by mid-robbery.”

E is quoted as saying “I actually met Jon at an Eels concert several years ago while Mad Men was still on the air. I was off stage between encores and the tour manager said, ‘Don Draper and Roger Sterling are here. I was like, ‘Oh my god’ because I'm a huge Mad Men fan and we’ve become friends since then.”

== Controversy ==
The band had to respond to claims from fans of New Zealand band Goodshirt that the video was too similar to one they had previously released called “Sophie” in 2002. E said “It’s been brought to our attention that our new video for the song ‘Are We Alright Again’ is eerily similar to one made by the New Zealand band Goodshirt. We were not familiar with the band or their video. It seems to be purely coincidental."

Director Greg Barnes explains the origin of his concept: “It wasn’t a burglary to begin with; I wanted the protagonist to wear headphones and to make some toast, and put a pot on the stove, play the track and completely forget the world around him – then – in the background the toast would set fire, the pot would bubble over and the entire kitchen would burn and break behind him. After talking with the production designers they told me that was way beyond our budget. Then, in an email conversation with my producer, I came up with the idea that it would be so much cheaper to turn it into a burglary – where items needn’t be destroyed but instead simply removed.” My sincere apologies to Goodshirt for the similarities. It's a crazy coincidence that we ended up with something so similar. The nice thing about this being called to our attention is now I know the band Goodshirt. They're awesome. Check them out.”

== Reception ==
Rolling Stone reported E saying that it was composed after the COVID-19 pandemic and was a “quarantine daydream I desperately needed to have” E is also quoted to say ”Are We Alright Again”, was really me writing a song trying to cheer myself up and give myself some hope that things will get better and I can only hope that it could do that for other people too... that was the only one that was done during the pandemic – it was done during the early days of the pandemic when it was just first getting bad and it was like a daydream I just needed to think about. Y’know, the whole quarantine thing ending, and part of me was secretly hoping that maybe by the time the album came out, it wouldn't be such a fantasy but more of a reality.But of course, that wasn't [how it] turned out, so it remains as much of a fantasy today as the day I wrote it. But I hope that it can still give us all some hope and something to look forward to, and that some day there will be a day when it feels like more of a reality.”

The Financial Times reflects that Are We Alright Again “looks forward to a time when the world can go back to doing and enjoying normal things.” The NME noted the irony “If you were laying bets on who would turn out to be 2020’s Mr Brightside, only the bravest would back Mark ‘E’ Everett. The indie star is reclusive, recently divorced, prone to recording albums about intense personal trauma and psychological collapse...Yet there he was on ‘Are We Alright Again’....singing his vision of post-Covid idyll: all “smiling skies”, marching bands and avian bong buddies”.

== See also ==
- List of one-shot music videos
