= Catherine Hardwicke =

American filmmaker (born 1955)

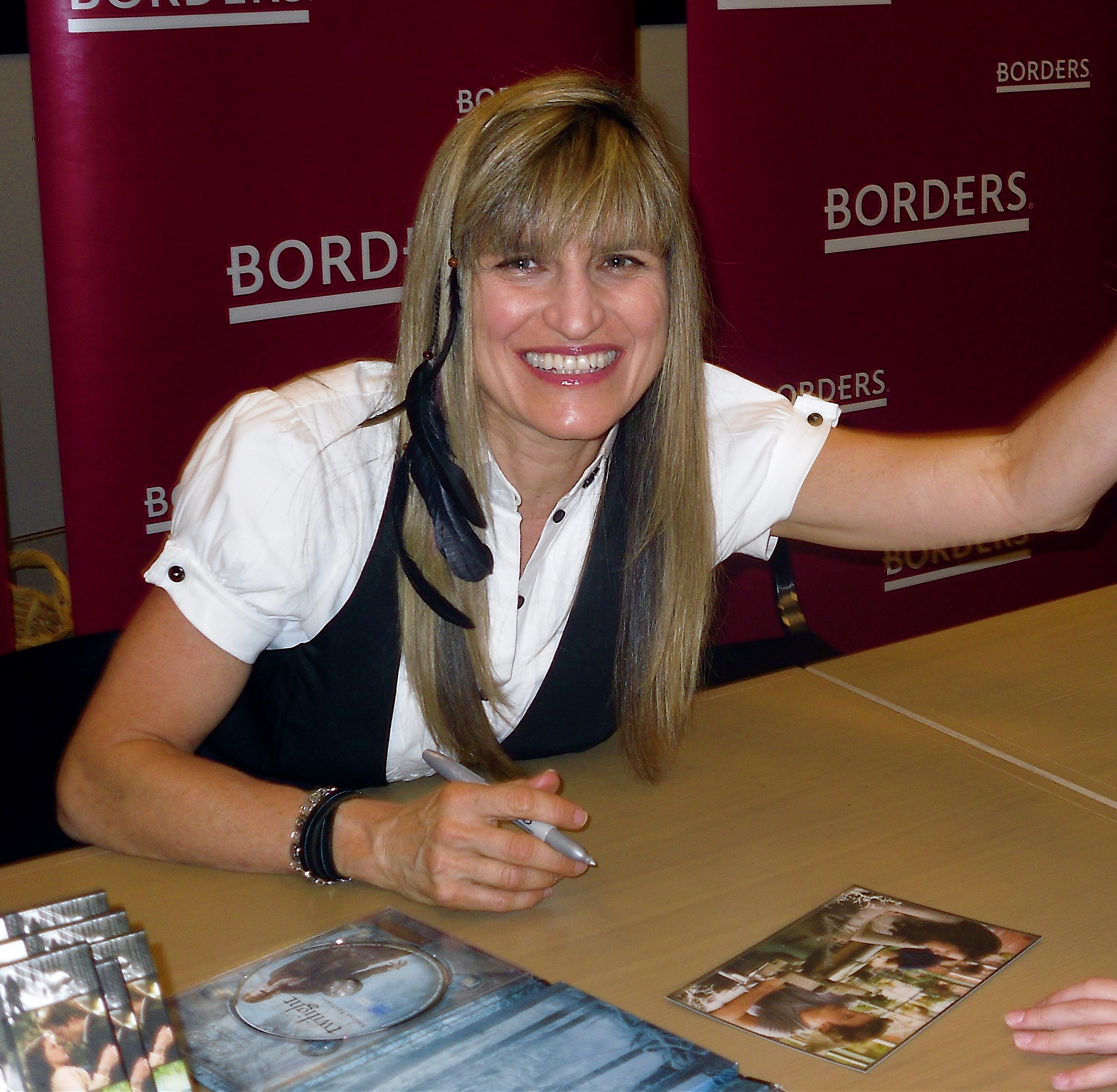
- Hardwicke in 2009
- Born: 1955 (age 70–71); Harlingen, Texas, U.S.
- Education: UCLA
- Occupations: Film director, production designer, screenwriter
- Years active: 1986–present

Catherine Hardwicke is an American film director, production designer, and screenwriter. Her directorial work includes Thirteen (2003), which she co-wrote with Nikki Reed, the film's co-star, Lords of Dogtown (2005), The Nativity Story (2006), Twilight (2008), Red Riding Hood (2011), Plush (2013), Miss You Already (2015), Miss Bala (2019), Prisoner's Daughter (2022), and Mafia Mamma (2023).

== Early life and work ==
Hardwicke was born in Harlingen, Texas. She grew up in McAllen on the U.S.–Mexico border, where her family owned and operated a farm along the Rio Grande, and was raised as a Presbyterian. Growing up in McAllen, Hardwicke describes it as "wild": in high school, "her principal was stabbed three times. A friend's father was shot in the back, and another friend was murdered. And yet life could be wonderful at the same time. 'It was a Huck Finn life, too,' she said." As a child she did not attend many movies and explains, "I didn’t go to many movies. Let's be honest: It was a cultural wasteland. At the time, you could not go to a significant museum unless you drove three hours to Corpus Christi or four to San Antonio". However, there were other ways to have fun such as sneaking over to the bars and nightclubs of Mexico before she was even a legal adult. Speaking on her early life Hardwicke says, "It was a wonderful childhood. I'm dying to make a movie about it".

She graduated from McAllen High School and went to the University of Texas at Austin, where she earned a degree in architecture. Among her post-graduation projects was designing the solar townhouse complex built around a man-made lake on the 20-acre site, complete with waterfalls and swimming pools. The property was owned by her father.

== Education ==
After graduating from her hometown high school, McAllen High School, Hardwicke went on to attend the University of Texas at Austin. Studying Architecture, Hardwicke felt that she had far too much creativity for that field, stating:

I was a little out there for architecture school. I would dress up like my building and people were like, "wow, dude, architecture really doesn’t encourage that type of creativity".

Feeling limited, Hardwicke moved to Los Angeles, where she studied at UCLA film school to explore her creative talents. Hardwicke made her first short film for her brother Jack who was marrying Nicolette Cullen. During this period in the 1980s, Hardwicke made an award-winning short, Puppy Does the Gumbo and was recognized with a Nissan Focus Award and was featured in the Landmark Best of UCLA film program.

== Film career ==
Hardwicke became a production designer, working with film directors such as Cameron Crowe, Richard Linklater, and David O. Russell. She was influenced by them, gaining experience in their techniques, and learning informal aspects from professional conversations. She talked to some about her desire to be a filmmaker, and received advice and tips.

While working with such big-name directors, she was able to study their techniques: "I always told them I really want to make my own movies, and they were all very generous and gave me tips." Her career as a production designer was crucial and beneficial to the molding of her career as a director. Her time spent with these directors aided her and were able to give her a sense of direction: "As you’re riding around with the director location scouting, you hear a lot of conversations and you start piecing them together, so I think that helped me." She even worked with fellow female director Lisa Cholodenko on her film Laurel Canyon (2002). Aside from her time spent working alongside directors, Hardwicke continued to work on her own projects such as scripts, short films, and teaching herself Final Cut Pro. Hardwicke even took it upon herself to take acting classes to become a better director.

Through the 1990s and early 2000s, Hardwicke worked as a production designer on films including Tombstone (1993), Freaked (1993), Tank Girl (1995), 2 Days in the Valley (1996), The Newton Boys (1998), Three Kings (1999), and Antitrust (2001). In 2000, she worked as production designer with director/screenwriter Cameron Crowe and actor/producer Tom Cruise on Vanilla Sky (2001).

Thirteen (2003)

Hardwicke's first film as a director was developed in collaboration with then-fourteen-year-old Nikki Reed, who wrote a screenplay that reflected some of Reed's teenage experiences. Hardwicke had known Reed since she was five years old, as she had been in a relationship with Reed's father. After the relationship ended, she continued to stay close with Reed. Hardwicke said "I started getting my hair cut by her mother, which is similar to the film, so I saw them every few months" she continues to say, "when [Nikki] turned thirteen, I started noticing she had completely changed to becoming quite angry with her family, her mother, and herself. I started seeing all these changes and difficulties she was going through, so I thought, along with her parents, that if she could hang out with me, things would get better". Throughout the time they spent together, Reed had revealed to Hardwicke that she was interested in acting which was the spark that ignited Thirteen. They completed the script in six days during Christmas break. When asked why there was an urgency to make the film, Hardwicke replied with "I felt it was almost like a snapshot of a particular time. I really wanted Nikki to be in it, because her energy was so inspiring to it, and I don't like the movies where the person is eighteen years old playing a thirteen-year-old, so I said, 'We're going to shoot it even if it's with a digital camera and me as the whole crew."' Evan Rachel Wood was contracted to star in the movie alongside Reed. The film tackles difficulties of contemporary teenagers. A young teen loses her innocence in a rapid spiral of events, with disturbing portrayals of drug, sex, theft, and dropping out of school. Capturing a range in high impact emotions, the film encapsulates the realness and authenticity of teen angst, that which includes mood changes and forming identities. "Instead of The Lizzie McGuire Movie, Hardwicke and Reed create an eye-opening portal into the life of teenagers growing up at an alarmingly young age; the anarchic friendship between Tracy (Evan Rachel Wood) and Evie (Reed) leads to a chaotic chain of events that include drugs, sexual encounters with a guy twice their age, and self-mutilation."

Reed and Hardwicke wrote the script from the point of view of Tracy, a "normal" 13-year-old who begins at a new middle school. There she meets Evie, who she thinks of as more advanced and whom she wants to impress. She hopes Evie will give her entrance to what she thinks is an exciting "crowd." The film actively interacts with the theme of conformity in the teenage years. Eager to become friends with Evie, Tracy loses her "normal" self and enters a world completely opposite of her own. Tracy's single mother Melanie, played by Holly Hunter, has tried to be a friend to her daughter and does not know how to deal with her changes. With divorced parents Tracy does not interact with her father as much, thus this serves as a way for her to feel anger towards both parents, impacting their parent-child relationship.The film features female friendship and the difficulties of adolescence. These friendships are viewed between Evie and Tracy as well as Tracy and Melanie. These eventually became recurring themes in Hardwicke's work. The film received critical acclaim and praise for its stars. Holly Hunter was nominated for the Academy Award for Best Supporting Actress. Thirteen earned Hardwicke the directing award at Sundance in 2003.

Lords of Dogtown (2005)

She went on to direct this fictionalized account of skateboarding culture. The film is based on the documentary Dogtown and Z-Boys by Stacy Peralta, whom Hardwicke had worked with. As she lived in Venice Beach and knew most of the Z- Boys well from surfing, Hardwicke drew on personal experience in directing the film. "I surf at the same break they surf at, and I know that world, explains the filmmaker."

Based on a true story, Lords of Dogtown follows the young Peralta, Tony Alva, and Jay Adams as they revolutionize the world of skateboarding. As California encounters a drought the 70s, residents began to empty out their pools. This led to a group of surfers in the Dogtown Area of Santa Monica to create a new sport, skateboarding. Board designer Skip Englblom, soon decides to add a skate team known as the Z-boys to his already well-known surf team. Taking advantage of the drought, the boys began to practice this new sport in the empty swimming pools. After the team begins to reach success like winning major contests, fame follows and soon the Z-boys start to appear in many magazines. Through this fame, the Z-boys (Stacy, Jay, and Tony) start to get noticed by well-known skateboarding companies in hopes to take the boys away from Skip. As the boys accept major career offers, one by one they leave the team, Stacy being the last to leave. Stacy, Jay and Tony become celebrities and rivals as they compete against each other in various competitions. Ultimately they skateboard for profit, abandoning the passion which they began with. After the pier that the boys used to surf around burns down, it negatively affects all three. The film explores Hardwicke's theme of teenage angst. Not only do the Z-boys find their passions with a newly created sport, but also they use this experience to form an identity amidst their teenage years. The film details teenage rebellion."As the boys fight one another and carve out their own identities by types, they collapse under their own mythology...Afraid and confused they make kid mistakes, use each other's trusts and don't image long term consequences." Hardwicke has said that the drama film was not intended to compete with the documentary, but to express the perspective of people as they lived the events, rather than later recounting them. The technical work was acclaimed, from the skate tricks to the complex camera work. Lance Mountain, legendary skater, cameraman and long-time friend of Peralta, shot the action while riding along behind the skateboarders.

The Nativity Story (2006)

In 2006, Hardwicke directed this biblical film for New Line Cinema. She was initially reluctant to take on the project as she was concerned about finding a fresh approach to the story, but changed her mind after conducting some research: "... I found out that Mary was 13 or 14 years old, by all accounts. And I thought, what about all the girls, the kids that I know? What if this happened to them? That's kind of mind-blowing, amazing. I thought it would be fun to go back and do something completely different." She also incorporated a psychological approach to Joseph and the difficulties he faced. Hardwicke wanted to cast a young actress as Mary, traditionally held to be about 14 or 15 at the time of Jesus' birth, given the marriage age of girls in that culture. She also wanted an actress who at least appeared to be Middle Eastern. She cast as her lead Keisha Castle-Hughes, the Oscar-nominated New Zealand actress of Māori descent, who starred in Whale Rider (2002).

Twilight (2008)

Her direction of the film adaptation of Stephenie Meyer's best-selling novel, Twilight, was an international commercial success. The film is the first in the series produced by Summit Entertainment based on Meyer's four books. Twilight is the story of a teenage girl named Bella Swan dealing with her parents' separation, and living with her father after years of having little to do with him. They live in a small town in Washington where she tries to adjust to a new school. Her typical teenage trials change character when she develops a crush on an attractive young vampire. The film and its leads attracted fans all over the world. In Korea specifically, the success of the Twilight film produced many fan sites, art, marketing products, and even themed cafes. These cafes allowed fans to share their love for the film franchise as well as the novels.

Hardwicke shot the film in 44 days on a budget of $37 million, which was reduced because of rights issues to do with the book. As her main actress, Kristen Stewart, was a minor, she could work only five and a half hours per day. This significantly slowed down shooting for the project. Hardwicke was willing to deal with that difficulty, as she believed that Stewart was perfect for the role as Bella. Casting for the character of Edward Cullen was more difficult. The character had to look like a high school student but portray a cultured persona and the learning of a long life. Hardwicke found Robert Pattinson unique, with his own wide range of interests in art, literature and music; she thought him deep enough for the part. Its $400 million global success made her the most commercially successful woman film director. Contrary to the success of the film, in the professional world Hardwicke found herself in a situation of unfairness. She states, "I definitely wasn't treated like men who had directed a blockbuster that launched a franchise." Although Twilight reached a $400 million worldwide gross with a budget of $37 million, Hardwicke did not become a household name filmmaker.

Amid rumors of a rocky relationship with Hardwicke, in 2008 Summit Entertainment announced that she would not direct the Twilight sequel, New Moon. Hardwicke said it was her decision, although a blog reported she had been fired by Summit. She said, "I couldn't even be fired, that's what's so funny. In my contract, I had the first right of refusal." She turned down the second film, she says, because the studio wanted to rush it out. "I do not regret it at all, thank the Lord. The truth is I liked the first book the best." Hardwicke went on to direct Red Riding Hood for Summit.

Red Riding Hood (2011)

Her following film was not a commercial or critical success. An adaptation of the classic fairy tale "Little Red Riding Hood", Hardwicke reimagined it as a coming of age story, exploring the theme of adolescence growing into adulthood and sexual awakening."When you're 10, you start latching on to it for another reason- why did she get in bed with the wolf? Hardwicke even compares the beast to a love interest. "It represents a dark animal nature which is close to sexuality." The film presents itself as an exploration and awareness of a young girls sexuality, "some say that it's a tale of a young girl's journey into puberty (hence the red cloak) and her subsequent sexual awakening; girls should steer clear of male predators, represented by the wolf." As in Neil Jordan's 1984 film The Company of Wolves, the wolf is a werewolf who lives as a human among the townspeople. The village begins to turn on itself as everyone is suspect. Gary Oldman arrives to help solve the mystery. Red Riding Hood is played by actress Amanda Seyfried, with supporting roles from Max Irons and Shiloh Fernandez as her love interests.

Plush (2013)

Hardwicke's next feature was in 2013 when she directed the erotic thriller Plush. Following a young female rock musician and her band Plush, the film starred Emily Browning, Cam Gigandet, Xavier Samuel and Frances Fisher. Reception was mainly negative, with Rotten Tomatoes giving it a 33% approval rating.

Reckless (2013)

Also in 2013, Hardwicke directed and executive produced the pilot for the CBS hour-long legal drama Reckless starring Cam Gigandet, Shawn Hatosy, Kim Wayans and Adam Rodriguez. It was ordered to series for the 2013-2014 season on May 12, 2013.

Miss You Already (2015)

Hardwicke directed the British-American comedy-drama Miss You Already in 2015. The film starred Drew Barrymore and Toni Collette as best friends who hit a snag in their friendship when one of them is diagnosed with cancer as the other becomes pregnant for the first time. The film premiered in the Gala Presentations section of the 2015 Toronto International Film Festival.

Miss Bala (2019)

Hardwicke directed the American-Mexican action-drama-thriller Miss Bala, a remake of 2011 film of the same name by Gerardo Naranjo. It stars Gina Rodriguez, Ismael Cruz Córdova, Anthony Mackie, Aislinn Derbez, Matt Lauria and Cristina Rodlo. It was released on February 1, 2019, by Columbia Pictures, and was a critical and commercial failure.

Prisoner's Daughter (2022)

Hardwicke directed Prisoner's Daughter, a drama written by Mark Bacci. It stars Kate Beckinsale, Brian Cox, Ernie Hudson, Christopher Convery, and Tyson Ritter. It premiered at the Toronto International Film Festival on September 14, 2022 and had a mixed critical reception.

== Themes ==
A common theme in her movies, specifically Thirteen and Lords of Dogtown, is teen angst. These movies revolve around the trouble that comes with adolescence and depict it realistically. In Thirteen, she shows the trials and tribulations that come with growing out of adolescence and into adulthood, and girls becoming women. Her film Lords of Dogtown features the laid-back California lifestyle and focuses on boys growing up in the streets of Venice. Hardwicke purposely casts young teens from indie films, "both of Hardwicke's pics are marked by the believable performances she elicits from young actors, something she says comes from respecting their creativity and a lot of time spent ‘just hanging out’".

Hardwicke addresses teenage problems as real ones, rather than simply dismissing them: "I care about difficult emotional moments and I want to be there for those moments and not cut away". Hardwicke's films are notable for their realistic depiction of teen lives and emotions.

== Other endeavors ==
Hardwicke has worked with many tween idols of the 2000s: Evan Rachel Wood, Nikki Reed (Thirteen), Emile Hirsch (Lords of Dogtown), Kristen Stewart, Robert Pattinson, and Taylor Lautner (Twilight), whose breakthrough roles were in her highly successful films. Hardwicke's films have been considered "dark" in story and tone. In 2009, she was awarded the Women in Film Dorothy Arzner Directors Award.

In 2012, Hardwicke helped create a public service announcement for the National Women's History Museum. Hardwicke came up with the idea for the announcement and contributed to the script.

== Filmography ==
=== Film ===
Year	Title	Director	Producer	Writer	Notes
2003	Thirteen	Yes	No	Yes	Also executive soundtrack producer
2005	Lords of Dogtown	Yes	No	No	Also executive soundtrack producer
2006	The Nativity Story	Yes	Executive	No	
2008	Twilight	Yes	No	No	
2011	Red Riding Hood	Yes	Executive	No	
2013	Plush	Yes	Yes	Yes	
2015	Miss You Already	Yes	No	No	
2019	Miss Bala	Yes	No	No	
2022	Don't Worry Darling	No	Executive	No	
2022	Prisoner's Daughter	Yes	No	No	
2022	Tell It Like a Woman	Yes	Yes	No	
2023	Mafia Mamma	Yes	No	No	
2026	Street Smart	Yes	Yes	Co-writer	

=== Short film ===
- The Black Ghiandola (2017) (Co-directed with Sam Raimi and Theodore Melfi)

=== Television ===
Year	Title	Director	Executive producer	Notes
2013	Reckless	Yes	Yes	Episode "Pilot"
2016	Eyewitness	Yes	Yes	2 episodes
2018-2020	This Is Us	Yes	No	2 episodes
2022	Guillermo del Toro's Cabinet of Curiosities	Yes	No	Episode "The Dreams in the Witch House"
TBA	The Raven Cycle	Yes	Yes	Episode "Pilot"

=== Music videos ===
Year	Title	Artist
1987	"Affection" (Box version)	New Monkees
2015	"There's a Place"	The All-American Rejects
2015	"Til It Happens to You"	Lady Gaga

== Awards and nominations ==
Year	Title	Award/Nomination
2003	Thirteen	Sundance Film Festival Dramatic Directing Award; Deauville Film Festival Jury Special Prize; Directors View Film Festival Dorothy Arzner Prize; Locarno International Film Festival Silver Leopard Award; Nantucket Film Festival Award for Best Feature Screenplay; National Board of Review, USA Special Recognition Award; Nominated—Bratislava International Film Festival for Grand Prix Award; Nominated—Deauville Film Festival for Grand Special Prize; Nominated—Gijon International Film Festival for Grand Prix Asturias; Nominated—Independent Spirit Awards for Best First Feature; Nominated—Independent Spirit Awards for Best First Screenplay; Nominated—Locarno International Film Festival for Golden Leopard Award; Nominated—Phoenix Film Critics Society Awards for Best Screenplay, Original; Nominated—Satellite Awards for Best Director; Nominated—Satellite Awards for Best Screenplay, Original; Nominated—Sundance Film Festival Grand Jury Prize(Dramatic); Nominated—Washington DC Area Film Critics Association Awards for Best Screenplay, Original
2005	Lords of Dogtown	Nominated—Golden Trailer Awards for Best Drama; Nominated—Teen Choice Awards for Action Adventure
2006	The Nativity Story	Heartland Film Festival for Truly Moving Picture; MovieGuide Awards Epiphany Prize for Film
2008	Twilight	Young Hollywood Award

== See also ==
- List of female film and television directors
- List of LGBT-related films directed by women
