= Extreme Witchcraft =

Studio album by Eels
- Released: January 28, 2022
- Recorded: March – October 2021
- Genres: Garage rock; psychedelia; funk; indie rock
- Length: 38:36
- Labels: E Works; PIAS
- Producers: E; John Parish

Eels chronology
| Earth to Dora (2020) | Extreme Witchcraft (2022) | Eels So Good: Essential Eels, Vol. 2 (2007–2020) (2023) |

Singles from Extreme Witchcraft
- 1. "Good Night on Earth" Released: September 21, 2021; 2. "Steam Engine" Released: October 27, 2021; 3. "The Magic" Released: November 23, 2021; 4. "Amateur Hour" Released: January 5, 2022

Professional ratings
Review scores
| Source | Rating |
|---|---|
| DIY | 4/5 stars |

Extreme Witchcraft is the fourteenth studio album by American indie rock band Eels, released through E Works/PIAS Recordings on January 28, 2022. It was preceded by the singles "Good Night on Earth", "Steam Engine", "The Magic", and "Amateur Hour". The album was supported by the 2023 Lockdown Hurricane world tour.

== Background ==
After a 1998 performance of "Last Stop: This Town" on the British music chart program Top of the Pops, Eels frontman Mark Oliver "E" Everett and PJ Harvey's John Parish met backstage. They discussed the possibility of a collaboration, leading to the two coming up with the 2001 album Souljacker, along with subsequent live performances, the latest being in 2019.

During the height of the COVID-19 pandemic lockdown in early 2021, Everett received a message from Mark Romanek, the director of the "Novocaine for the Soul" music video. Romanek revealed to Everett that he had been in an "intense" Souljacker phase, giving Everett an idea of contacting Parish to see if he would be up for some musical ideas.

=== Recording ===
During the beginning of the project, due to differing time zones, Everett worked at 4 am in his Los Feliz home, while Parish worked in his HonorSound studio in Bristol. Everett would occasionally email tracks to his bandmate Koool G Murder, asking for his input and if he wanted to contribute. Parish then flew to Los Angeles, working on most of the album in Everett's studio with Koool G Murder. Everett mentions that the album was constructed "very organically and quickly" and was finished in a matter of weeks.

=== Title ===
The title originates from a 2018 filing of a restraining order against Beyoncé by her former drummer Kimberly Thompson, who accused Beyoncé of casting "magic spells of sexual molestation", murdering her kitten, and practicing "extreme witchcraft, dark magic". Everett was amused by the story and joked about naming his next album "Extreme Witchcraft".

It was a potential title for the Earth to Dora album, but because of the differing dynamics of the title and the songs themselves, the name was scrapped. The title would come into play again while working with Parish, giving him buzz words like "give me some voodoo" or "give me something witchy".

== Critical reception ==
Extreme Witchcraft received generally positive reviews from critics. On Metacritic, the album has a weighted average score of 72 out of 100 based on 13 reviews, indicating "generally favorable reviews". Many critics drew comparisons to Everett and Parish' previous collaboration on Souljacker.

Joe Goggins of DIY awarded the album four out of five stars and wrote that it is "as freewheeling as Eels have sounded since Souljacker". Goggins elaborated that the album "casts E as the kind of louche rock frontman he's increasingly presented himself as on stage in recent years", concluding that it "is a record scored through, unmistakably, with a desire to have some fun".

Mark Beaumont of NME gave the album three stars, describing it as "Fuzzed-up garage rock and sonic throwbacks to 'Souljacker' stand out, but occasionally its spell-casting misses the mark" and concluded "Rather than a fresh blast of wizardry, ‘Extreme Witchcraft’ is more of a feet-finder for our times." Hal Horowitz of American Songwriter gave the album four and a half stars, praising the album's variety and the return of John Parish, finding "None of these 12 selections break the four-minute mark yet they exude so many ingenious lyrical and musical left turns that each begs another play to catch what you missed the first time. E’s dusky voice puts everything across with cool, detached aplomb adding to the songs’ clever charms."

Mark Deming of AllMusic gave the album four stars and said it "is a standout in the Eels catalog in that Everett actually sounds like he's enjoying himself much of the time; he's still working out his demons, but his musical therapy agrees with him and he reveals an energy and spark that verges on playful." and concluded "Extreme Witchcraft isn't a big basket of musical sunshine, but it's been a while since Eels have made an album with this sort of muddled joy, and it's a welcome development from one of pop's major misfits." Matt the Raven of Under the Radar gave the album six out of ten stars, finding "the handful of slower, softer tracks and the straightforward rock approach are enough to drag Extreme Witchcraft down below the expectations of EELS’ decades-old reputation." but thought "for those that grew to love EELS from their early beginnings in the late ’90s through the early 2000s, you’ll understand the shortcomings here. Fortunately, a sub-par EELS is still better than most."

Nathan Whittle of Louder Than War gave the album four stars and felt the band had gone "back into their fuzz-crunching Souljacker sound to great effect." concluding, "Everett and Eels show that they still have a ton of ideas to fire off and, in hooking up once again with John Parish, they might just have come back with their best album of late." David Coleman of No Ripchord dismissed the album, calling it "a frustratingly stodgy affair"

Robin Murray of Clash gave the album seven out of ten, feeling it was "Eels at their most playful, with the band’s carefree wizardry still delivering thrills, even after all these years. While not ranking with their absolute best work, in terms of breakneck guitar-led songwriting it more than delivers. David Brusie of The A.V Club said the album "finds Mark Oliver Everett cutting loose but misplacing his knack for precision songcraft" and observed "this album is E shaking off the dust with some swampy distortion, albeit to mixed results." and gave the album a C+.

== Track listing ==
All tracks are written by Mark Oliver Everett and John Parish except where noted.

Extreme Witchcraft track listing
| No. | Title | Writer(s) | Length |
|---|---|---|---|
| 1. | "Amateur Hour" | | 2:33 |
| 2. | "Good Night on Earth" | | 3:18 |
| 3. | "Strawberries & Popcorn" | | 3:43 |
| 4. | "Steam Engine" | Everett / Kelly Logsdon | 3:14 |
| 5. | "Grandfather Clock Strikes Twelve" | Everett | 3:23 |
| 6. | "Stumbling Bee" | | 3:38 |
| 7. | "The Magic" | | 3:12 |
| 8. | "Better Living Through Desperation" | | 2:32 |
| 9. | "So Anyway" | | 3:22 |
| 10. | "What It Isn't" | Everett / Logsdon | 3:49 |
| 11. | "Learning While I Lose" | Everett / Mike Sawitzke | 2:45 |
| 12. | "I Know You're Right" | Everett / Logsdon | 3:07 |
| Total length: | | | 38:36 |

== Personnel ==
Eels

- E – guitar, vocals, production, recording (all except 5), mixing (all except 5)
- Koool G Murder – bass guitar, recording, mixing (all except 5 and 11)
- John Parish – guitar, production, recording, mixing (1, 2, 3, 6, 7, 8, 9)
- P-Boo – drums, recording, mixing ("Learning While I Lose")

Production

- Philip Beaudreau – design
- Gus Black – photography
- Ryan Bosch – recording, mixing ("Grandfather Clock Strikes Twelve")
- Don Hersch – mastering at D2 Mastering

== Charts ==
Chart performance for Extreme Witchcraft
| Chart (2022) | Peak position |
|---|---|
| Austrian Albums (Ö3 Austria) | 14 |
| Belgian Albums (Ultratop Flanders) | 4 |
| Belgian Albums (Ultratop Wallonia) | 16 |
| Dutch Albums (Album Top 100) | 14 |
| French Albums (SNEP) | 49 |
| German Albums (Offizielle Top 100) | 7 |
| Scottish Albums (Official Charts) | 12 |
| Spanish Albums (Promusicae) | 77 |
| Swiss Albums (Schweizer Hitparade) | 7 |
| UK Albums (Official Charts) | 37 |
| UK Independent Albums (Official Charts) | 5 |
