= The Cautionary Tales of Mark Oliver Everett =

Studio album by Eels
- Released: April 21, 2014
- Recorded: August 2013 – February 2014
- Studios: Onehitsville Hollywood The Compound Los Feliz, Silver Lake
- Genres: Indie rock; chamber pop; folk rock
- Length: 40:25
- Label: E Works
- Producer: E

Eels chronology
Wonderful, Glorious (2013)	The Cautionary Tales of Mark Oliver Everett (2014)	Live at Royal Albert Hall (2015)

The Cautionary Tales of Mark Oliver Everett is the eleventh studio album by American indie rock band Eels, released on April 21, 2014 by record label E Works. The album was produced by frontman Mark Oliver Everett.

== Reception ==
Professional ratings
Aggregate scores
Source	Rating
Metacritic	70/100
Review scores
Source	Rating
AllMusic	3.5/5 stars
Consequence of Sound	D+
The Guardian	2/5 stars
The Independent	3/5 stars
NME	7/10
The Observer	4/5 stars
Paste	8.9/10
PopMatters	6/10
Slant	2.5/5 stars
Under the Radar	5.5/10

The Cautionary Tales of Mark Oliver Everett received generally positive reviews from critics. On Metacritic, the album has a weighted average score of 70 out of 100 based on 23 reviews, indicating "generally favorable reviews". Many critics noted the album's autobiographical themes, but many felt its themes and sound were very familiar with previous output from the band.

Phil Mongredien of The Observer wrote: "The subject matter may not be as harrowing as the real-life inspiration for some of his earlier work (most notably Electro-Shock Blues), but this is still a powerful and emotionally coherent set." Lior Phillips of Consequence of Sound was unfavorable, writing: "What The Cautionary Tales needs is a prudent pruning. This album struggles to appear deeper than a common puddle, and while E's previous penchant for sharing has given him a brilliant book of songs from which to draw, I wonder how long he'll stay floating on the surface."

Steve Leggett of Allmusic gave the album three stars and noted "He turned 50 while writing these songs, so maybe that has something to do with the heavy and regretful tone that washes through these rather muted, weary, and almost whispered musings, few of which even rise to the tempo of a slow shuffle." Holly Gleason of Paste gave a positive review, saying, "His jagged details scrape your flesh to the bone, but his bitterness or rancor is tempered with a romanticism that makes listeners ache more than rage. This postmodern sensitive—landing somewhere between Tom Waits’ raspy reality and Jackson Browne's tenderness—walks a line between desire and doom with dignity and just the slightest bit of slump-shouldered resignation."

Max Raymond of MusicOHM gave the album three and a half stars, feeling "The Cautionary Tales Of Mark Oliver Everett isn’t necessarily an album that heralds the return of ‘classic Eels‘, even if all the signs are present and correct. Eels has always subtly changed direction with every release, though the last five years of Everett’s career has particularly emphasised this." and concluded "Though this is a flawed collection, The Cautionary Tales Of Mark Oliver Everett still partially succeeds in getting the message across perfectly in an accessible and honest manner." Robin Smith of Popmatters felt it "certainly doesn’t feel new--it ultimately feels like a retread of the orchestral and maudlin sound he tried on two records ago--but it feels true to its songwriter."

Mark Beaumont of NME "Bereft of blues bombast, electronic trickery or bothersome concepts, when E's not coming on like Red House Painters he's getting seriously classical." also noting "archaic folk ballads" and "chamber orchestra sweeps with Barbican ambitions, redolent of the lonely Broadway whiskey room and medieval battleground respectively."Mojo praised the album saying,"It's the chiming guitars of album centerpiece, A Swallow In The Sun, that really underlines a sense that The Cautionary Tales Of... operates in the same ballpark as Sea Change--Beck's 2002 work of staggering heartbreak."

== Track listing ==
Written by E, except as noted

1. "Where I'm At" (E, arr. by The Chet and P-Boo) – 1:42
2. "Parallels" – 3:16
3. "Lockdown Hurricane" (E; arr. by P-Boo) – 3:30
4. "Agatha Chang" (E; arr. by P-Boo) – 3:28
5. "A Swallow in the Sun" (E, The Chet; arr. by The Chet) – 3:37
6. "Where I'm From" (E, P-Boo) – 2:49
7. "Series of Misunderstandings" – 3:23
8. "Kindred Spirit" (E, P-Boo) – 2:54
9. "Gentlemen's Choice" (E, P-Boo; arr. by P-Boo) – 2:36
10. "Dead Reckoning" (E, P-Boo; arr. by P-Boo) – 2:29
11. "Answers" (E; arr. by P-Boo) – 2:39
12. "Mistakes of My Youth" (E, The Chet; arr. by The Chet) – 4:57
13. "Where I'm Going" (E; arr. by The Chet) – 3:04

Deluxe Edition bonus disc

1. "To Dig It"
2. "Lonely Lockdown Hurricane" (E; orchestral arrangement by P-Boo)
3. "Bow Out" (E, P-Boo)
4. "A Good Deal"
5. "Good Morning Bright Eyes"
6. "Millicent Don't Blame Yourself" (E, Koool G Murder)
7. "Thanks I Guess" (E, P-Boo)
8. "On the Ropes" (Live WNYC) (E, The Chet, Koool G Murder)
9. "Accident Prone" (Live WNYC) (E, P-Boo)
10. "I'm Your Brave Little Soldier (Live WNYC)
11. "Fresh Feeling" (Live KCRW) (E, Koool G Murder)
12. "Trouble with Dreams" (Live KCRW)
13. "Oh Well" (Live KCRW) (Peter Green)

== Personnel ==
Eels

- The Chet
- E
- Knuckles
- Koool G Murder
- P-Boo

== Charts ==
=== Weekly charts ===
Chart (2014)	Peak position
Austrian Albums (Ö3 Austria)	14
Belgian Albums (Ultratop Flanders)	2
Belgian Albums (Ultratop Wallonia)	12
Dutch Albums (Album Top 100)	8
French Albums (SNEP)	21
German Albums (Offizielle Top 100)	10
Irish Albums (IRMA)	8
Scottish Albums (Official Charts)	8
Spanish Albums (Promusicae)	33
Swiss Albums (Schweizer Hitparade)	5
UK Albums (Official Charts)	7
UK Independent Albums (Official Charts)	1
US Billboard 200	96
US Independent Albums (Billboard)	17
US Top Rock Albums (Billboard)	24

=== Year-end charts ===
Chart (2014)	Position
Belgian Albums (Ultratop Flanders)	48
