= A Line in the Dirt =

Single by Eels

from the album End Times
- A-side: "A Line in the Dirt"
- B-side: "Little Bird"
- Released: January 13, 2010
- Length: 3:30
- Label: Vagrant, E Works
- Songwriter: E
- Producer: E

Eels singles chronology
| "Fresh Blood/My Timing Is Off" (2009) | "A Line in the Dirt" (2010) | "Looking Up" (2010) |

"A Line in the Dirt" is a 2010 single by Eels from the album End Times. The cover to the single and the album were illustrated by Adrian Tomine. The single was originally released through Eels' online store on January 13, 2010, and was released for general distribution on March 1, 2010.

== Track listing ==
All songs written by E.

1. "A Line in the Dirt" – 3:30
2. "Little Bird" – 2:34

== Sales chart performance ==
The song reached 32 on the Belgium Singles Chart (Flanders).
