= End Times (album) =

Studio album by Eels
- Released: January 19, 2010
- Recorded: December 2008 – August 2009
- Studio: OneHitsville, U.S.A.; Los Feliz, California, United States
- Genre: Indie rock; lo-fi
- Length: 39:56
- Label: Vagrant, E Works
- Producer: Mark Oliver Everett

Eels chronology
| Hombre Lobo (2009) | End Times (2010) | Tomorrow Morning (2010) |

Singles from End Times
- 1. "A Line in the Dirt" Released: January 13, 2010

End Times is the eighth studio album by American rock band Eels released on January 19, 2010. End Times is the second in a trilogy of concept albums covering lust, loss and redemption starting with 2009's Hombre Lobo, which covered lust, and finishing with Tomorrow Morning, which covered redemption and released later in 2010. The album was self-produced by frontman Mark Oliver Everett and includes songs about divorce. The cover was designed by American cartoonist Adrian Tomine.

== Background ==
Continuing the trilogy started by Hombre Lobo, End Times covers themes of heartbreak and divorce, influenced by Mark Oliver Everett's then recent divorce. Undercover said "‘End Times’ could be a bookend with E’s last break-up album ‘Broken Toy Shop’ from 1993." The album has been noted for its stripped back "lo-fi" sound and emotional tone

Most of the album was solely recorded by Everett, which he found to be more difficult than he anticipated, "I naively thought that because I was going to do something alone it would be easy. Then it turns out that those things are the hardest to do. I thought like “oh I’ll just sit down with my old four track recorder and sing some songs”. At times it was difficult to record.” Despite being the second entry in the trilogy, it was the first to be recorded.

The album starts with ‘The Beginning’ which has been described as "a stripped down and wistful song that sets the listener up for the heartache that follows.", while other songs, such as "My Younger Days" cover themes of ageing.

== Release ==
End Times was released on January 19, 2010. The album was also released in a deluxe edition with a bonus EP. Everett has addressed the brevity of its release from Hombre Lobo saying he “felt guilty about the long gap between" Hombre Lobo (2009) and Blinking Lights and Other Revelations (2005) and he was "making up for lost time,”

The music video for "Little Bird" was released on YouTube through the official Eels channel in November 2009 and "In My Younger Days" in December 2009. The single for "A Line in the Dirt" backed with "Little Bird" was released through Eels' online store on January 13, 2010.

== Reception ==
Professional ratings
Review scores
| Source | Rating |
|---|---|
| AllMusic | 4/5 stars |
| Drowned in Sound | 4/5 stars |
| The Guardian | 4/5 stars |
| NME | 8/10 |
| Pitchfork | 3.9/10 |
| Rolling Stone | 3/5 stars |
| Slant Magazine | 2/5 stars |
| Spin | 3.5/5 stars |

Critical response to the album has been mostly positive. Will Dean of The Guardian called it "a classic break-up album".

Zach Kelly of Pitchfork published a negative review of the album, calling it "by all accounts a break-up album, but one that's plodding, boring, and full of icky self-pity [...] Eventually, Everett's disassociation with himself results in a disassociation with the music, as each painfully plain entry becomes simply exhaustively dull." Thom Jurek of AllMusic praised the album in a four star review saying, "This is a dark, sparse, elegantly -- and enjoyably -- somewhat mopey, paradoxical album. It’s emotionally raw, but devoid of self-pity. It's charming in its sense of irony and self-awareness," Mischa Pearlman of Clash said "‘End Times’ may be a tunnel with no light at the end of it, but the bleakness is beautiful."

== Track listing ==
All songs written by E.

1. "The Beginning" – 2:16
2. "Gone Man" – 2:59
3. "In My Younger Days" – 3:25
4. "Mansions of Los Feliz" – 2:49
5. "A Line in the Dirt" – 3:30
6. "End Times" – 2:58
7. "Apple Trees" – 0:40
8. "Paradise Blues" – 3:03
9. "Nowadays" – 3:09
10. "Unhinged" – 2:26
11. "High and Lonesome" – 1:07
12. "I Need a Mother" – 2:39
13. "Little Bird" – 2:34
14. "On My Feet" – 6:21

Deluxe edition bonus EP

1. "And Now for the End Times" – 0:19
2. "Some Friend" – 2:42
3. "Walking Cloud" – 2:25
4. "$200 Tattoo" – 2:02
5. "The Man Who Didn't Know He'd Lost His Mind" – 2:36

The short spoken-word introduction is only available on the iTunes Store edition of the album.

== Personnel ==
Eels

- E – vocals, guitars, bass guitar, harmonica, piano, Optigan, Hammond B3, banjo, pump organ, Vox Continental, drums, percussion, production
- Butch – drums on "A Line in the Dirt"
- Koool G Murder – bass, guitar, recording, mixing on "Paradise Blues" and "Nowadays"
- Wayne Bergeron – French horn, horns
- Chris Bleth – horns
- Andy Martin – horns

Technical personnel

- Ryan Boesch – recording and mixing on "Apple Trees", "Gone Man", and "In My Younger Days"
- Robert Carranza – recording, mixing on "A Line in the Dirt"
- Greg Collins – recording and mixing on "Apple Trees"
- Jim Lang – recording and horn arrangements on "A Line in the Dirt" and "Nowadays"

== Charts ==
=== Weekly charts ===
Weekly chart performance for End Times
| Chart (2010) | Peak position |
|---|---|
| Australian Albums (ARIA) | 48 |
| Austrian Albums (Ö3 Austria) | 33 |
| Belgian Albums (Ultratop Flanders) | 2 |
| Belgian Albums (Ultratop Wallonia) | 32 |
| Dutch Albums (Album Top 100) | 19 |
| French Albums (SNEP) | 74 |
| German Albums (Offizielle Top 100) | 29 |
| Irish Albums (IRMA) | 13 |
| Italian Albums (FIMI) | 79 |
| Swiss Albums (Schweizer Hitparade) | 10 |
| UK Albums (OCC) | 21 |
| US Billboard 200 | 66 |
| US Top Alternative Albums (Billboard) | 13 |
| US Top Rock Albums (Billboard) | 17 |

=== Year-end charts ===
Year-end chart performance for End Times
| Chart (2010) | Position |
|---|---|
| Belgian Albums (Ultratop Flanders) | 32 |
