= Wonderful, Glorious =

Studio album by Eels
- Released: February 4, 2013
- Recorded: May–December 2012
- Studios: The Compound, Silver Lake, Los Angeles and No-Hitsville U.S.A., Los Feliz, Los Angeles, California, United States
- Genres: Indie rock; garage rock
- Length: 49:41
- Label: E Works/Vagrant
- Producer: E

Eels chronology
Tomorrow Morning (2010)	Wonderful, Glorious (2013)	The Cautionary Tales of Mark Oliver Everett (2014)

Singles from Wonderful, Glorious
- 1. "Peach Blossom" Released: November 6, 2012 (promo); 2. "New Alphabet"/"I'm Your Brave Little Soldier" Released: February 28, 2013

Wonderful, Glorious is the tenth studio album by American alternative rock band Eels, released in 2013 by record labels Vagrant and E Works. The album was produced by band leader Mark Oliver "E" Everett. A worldwide tour accompanied the album release.

== Recording ==
The songs were recorded in band leader Mark Oliver Everett's home studio in Los Feliz, Los Angeles, which was built for this album, after his previous home studio became too cramped for effectively recording. In an unusual choice for an Eels album, Everett decided to work on the songs by jamming with fellow Eels members and composing at home, only drawing upon sparse lyrics from his notebooks. He got the idea of collaborating with these musicians in particular after his last two tours and three albums featured a relatively stable line-up to the Eels musical collective.

== Release ==
Wonderful, Glorious was released on February 4, 2013 by record labels Vagrant and E Works.

== Reception ==
Professional ratings
Aggregate scores
Source	Rating
Metacritic	76/100
Review scores
Source	Rating
The A.V. Club	B+
American Songwriter	3.5/5 stars
BBC Music	Favorable
Consequence of Sound	2.5/5 stars
Drowned in Sound	6/10
The Guardian	4/5 stars
NME	8/10
The Observer	3/5 stars
Paste	6/10
The Skinny	4/5 stars

The Skinny's Stu Lewis gave the album four out of five stars, praising the harder rock sound of the album, calling it "work few contemporary indie rock bands could better," and Eric Magnuson's review in American Songwriter writes that the lyrics are demanding "like [Everett] has a knife to your throat, creating a wonderful paradox". Jude Clarke of BBC Music summarizes her review by saying the album "continues the band's long-running, idiosyncratic and distinctively creative career path." Maddy Costa of The Guardian also praised the album's hard rock sound, noting that the lyrics are "delivered in a growl so jittery and aggressive that gentleness is obliterated." About.com's review by Tim Grierson emphasizes the diversity in songwriting, stating that Wonderful, Glorious "offer[s] variations on familiar styles and delivering a few delightful curve balls in the process."

Several reviewers have noted the positive and uplifting themes of the lyrics, such as The Observer's Phil Mongredien and Jon Clark of Drowned in Sound whose review stated that "the negativity often present in Eels records is less noticeable here; in fact the record contains many optimistic, if particularly frank and defiant, testimonials." Michael Gallucci of The A.V. Club writes that the lyrics express E's relief after Eels' concept album trilogy. Writing for NME, Kevin E. G. Perry contrasts the optimism of the lyrics with E's personal tragedies, concluding that "part of the triumph of this record is just how upbeat he sounds while talking about everything from love and loss to mortality itself." Paste's Ryan Reed considers the positivity "awkwardly forced" leading to an album of "lifeless non-revelations married to engrossing tunes".

== Track listing ==
All songs written by E, except where noted

1. "Bombs Away" (E, Koool G Murder, The Chet) – 5:23
2. "Kinda Fuzzy" (E, Koool G Murder, The Chet, P-Boo) – 3:38
3. "Accident Prone" (E, P-Boo) – 2:48
4. "Peach Blossom" (E, Koool G Murder, The Chet) – 4:05
5. "On the Ropes" (E, Koool G Murder, The Chet) – 3:10
6. "The Turnaround" (E, Koool G Murder, The Chet) – 4:49
7. "New Alphabet" (E, Koool G Murder, The Chet) – 4:08
8. "Stick Together" (E, Koool G Murder, The Chet, P-Boo, Knuckles) – 3:42
9. "True Original" – 3:48
10. "Open My Present" (E, P-Boo) – 3:09
11. "You're My Friend" (E, Kool G Murder) – 3:47
12. "I Am Building a Shrine" (E, P-Boo) – 3:35
13. "Wonderful, Glorious" (E, Knuckles, Koool G Murder, The Chet) – 3:43

Deluxe edition bonus disc

1. "Hold On to Your Hat" – 0:46
2. "Your Mama Warned You" (E, P-Boo) – 3:09
3. "I'm Your Brave Little Soldier" – 2:51
4. "There's Something Strange" (E, The Chet, Koool G Murder) – 3:13
5. "Happy Hour (We're Gonna Rock)" (E, John Parish, Koool G Murder) – 3:50
6. "That's Not Really Funny" (Live 2011) (E, John Parish) – 4:55
7. "In My Dreams" (Live 2010) (E, Koool G Murder) – 3:07
8. "Prizefighter" (Live 2010) (E, Koool G Murder) – 3:01
9. "Looking Up" (Live 2011) – 5:06
10. "What I Have to Offer" (Live at KEXP) – 2:56
11. "I Like the Way This Is Going" (Live at KEXP) – 2:13
12. "Spectacular Girl" (Live at KEXP) – 3:32
13. "Summer in the City" (Live at KEXP) (John Sebastian, Mark Sebastian, Steve Boone) – 2:12

== Personnel ==
Eels

- The Chet – guitar
- E – vocals, guitar, production
- Knuckles – drums
- Koool G Murder – bass guitar
- P-Boo – guitar

== Charts ==
=== Weekly charts ===
Chart (2013)	Peak position
Austrian Albums (Ö3 Austria)	18
Belgian Albums (Ultratop Flanders)	1
Belgian Albums (Ultratop Wallonia)	43
Dutch Albums (Album Top 100)	11
French Albums (SNEP)	89
German Albums (Offizielle Top 100)	19
Irish Albums (IRMA)	15
Italian Albums (FIMI)	91
Scottish Albums (Official Charts)	12
Spanish Albums (Promusicae)	45
Swiss Albums (Schweizer Hitparade)	18
UK Albums (Official Charts)	14
US Billboard 200	74
US Top Rock Albums (Billboard)	21

=== Year-end charts ===
Chart (2013)	Position
Belgian Albums (Ultratop Flanders)	35
