= Earth to Dora =

Studio album by Eels
- Released: October 30, 2020
- Recorded: January–August 2020
- Studio: The Compound and OneHitsVille, Los Feliz, Los Angeles, California, United States
- Genre: Indie rock
- Length: 42:48
- Label: E Works/PIAS
- Producer: E

Eels chronology
The Deconstruction (2018)	Earth to Dora (2020)	Extreme Witchcraft (2022)

Earth to Dora is the thirteenth studio album by American indie rock band Eels, released on E Works/PIAS Recordings on October 30, 2020. It has received favorable reviews from critics.

== Recording and release ==
“These songs came about just before the pandemic hit and changed everything... I’m hoping they can be, maybe kind of soothing or something. To hear songs dealing with things we are dreaming about getting back to.”

—E on recording Earth to Dora

Eels' previous album The Deconstruction was followed by an extensive tour in 2018 and the band members were eager to record and release a new album to perform live again, with plans to start in January 2021 that were disrupted due to the COVID-19 pandemic; releasing the album without the ability to promote it was done to add some comfort to their fans who are on lockdown. Songwriting began with a text message thread to the band's lighting director Dora (namesake of the album) and continued collaboratively with other members of Eels. The songs on Earth to Dora were written before the pandemic and associated lockdown started. The album was preceded by the single "Baby Let's Make It Real"/"Who You Say You Are", announced on September 1, 2020. When Earth to Dora was announced on September 16, Eels made "Are We Alright Again" available as a single. A music video for that song followed on November 11.

The album cover is from a thrift store painting that hung in E's bathroom for a decade.

== Critical reception ==
According to the review aggregator Metacritic, Earth to Dora received "generally favorable reviews" based on a weighted average score of 71 out of 100 from thirteen critic scores. Album of the Year sums up critical consensus as a 71 out of 100, with 10 reviews and AnyDecentMusic? scores this a 6.9 out of 10 based on 13 reviews. Daniel Dylan Wray of Uncut gave the album a six out of 10, writing that there are moments of real beauty but the songs are too similar to one another and that "might be comfort via familiarity for some" but "lacking evolution for others". In Mojo, James McNair gave Earth to Dora four out of five stars, noting the balance of emotions in the lyrics. Rupert Hawksley of The Independent writes that while Eels have "been churning out the same inconsequential, loafing rock for years", due to the state of anxiety around COVID-19, "Eels’ dozy melodies and sweet, sun-baked lyrics sound reassuring, rather than bland" and are "exactly what we need"; his review gives Earth to Dora three out of five stars.

In The Times, Will Hodgkinson gave this release four out of five stars for the "bittersweet charm" of E's songwriting along with the emotional impact of his vocals. Emma Swann of DIY ranked Earth to Dora as two out of five stars, writing that E has nothing to say in his lyrics and having "basic" songs. David Cheal of Financial Times calls the album "moving and richly textured" for its emotional honesty, with a range from weariness to joy; his review is four out of five stars. For American Songwriter, Hal Horowitz gave Earth to Dora four out of five stars for being "another emotionally edgy chapter to [E's] artistic and spiritual journey that existing fans will appreciate". The editorial staff of AllMusic Guide gave this release 3.5 out of five stars, with reviewer Mark Deming praising the range of emotions in the lyrics and summing up the work as "well-written and imaginatively produced pop for grown-ups". In Under the Radar, Matt the Raven gave Earth to Dora four out of 10 stars, concluding, "It’s doubtful Earth to Dora will win EELS any new fans and will most likely leave existing fans disappointed. But if you work at it, you may find some redeeming qualities since a sub-par EELS is still better than most."

== Track listing ==
1. "Anything for Boo" (E and Koool G Murder) – 3:24
2. "Are We Alright Again" (E and Murder) – 3:44
3. "Who You Say You Are" (E and P-Boo) – 2:55
4. "Earth to Dora" (The Chet and E) – 3:43
5. "Dark and Dramatic" (The Chet and E) – 3:40
6. "Are You Fucking Your Ex" (E and P-Boo) – 3:41
7. "The Gentle Souls" (The Chet, E, and Murder) – 4:01
8. "Of Unsent Letters" (The Chet and E) – 3:08
9. "I Got Hurt" (E) – 4:17
10. "OK" (E and P-Boo) – 3:33
11. "Baby Let's Make It Real" (E and Murder) – 3:56
12. "Waking Up" (E) – 2:46

== Personnel ==
Eels

- The Chet – guitar, recording
- E – guitar, vocals, production
- Knuckles – drums
- Koool G Murder – bass guitar, recording, mixing
- P-Boo – guitar, recording

The band is accompanied by the Earth to Dora Orchestra & Choir, made up of unnamed musicians.

Technical personnel

- Mary Angela – paintings
- Phil Beaudreau – design
- Ryan Boesch – recording and mixing on "The Gentle Souls", "Of Unsent Letters", and "I Got Hurt"
- Dan Hersch – mastering

== Charts ==
Chart performance for Earth to Dora
Chart (2020)	Peak position
Austrian Albums (Ö3 Austria)	18
Belgian Albums (Ultratop Flanders)	4
Belgian Albums (Ultratop Wallonia)	34
Dutch Albums (Album Top 100)	23
French Albums (SNEP)	73
German Albums (Offizielle Top 100)	18
Scottish Albums (OCC)	14
Spanish Albums (PROMUSICAE)	87
Swiss Albums (Schweizer Hitparade)	18
UK Albums (OCC)	37

== See also ==
- List of 2020 albums
