= Sam Houston Elementary School (McAllen, Texas) =

Public elementary school in McAllen, Texas

Coordinates: 26°9′42″N 98°15′49″W

Sam Houston Elementary School is a public elementary school in the Los Encinos area of McAllen, Texas. A part of the McAllen Independent School District (MISD), it is the oldest public school in the city. It is named after Sam Houston.

== History ==
The school first opened in 1920. For a period of 50 years it was located at 1001 S. 16th Street, in the La Paloma area of south-central McAllen. As of the early 1990s this building was in a poor condition due to a lack of maintenance.

Connie Maheshwari became the principal of Sam Houston in fall 1990. Around January 1994 Maheshwari decided to become involved with the Alliance School partnership in order to improve the school. The McAllen ISD board decided to relocate the school to the newly-developed 246 house Los Encinos area, a community developed by McAllen Affordable Homes for low and moderate income homeowners. The proposal made by Dr. Robert Schumacher, newly-appointed as the MISD superintendent, was that the existing Houston Elementary attendance boundary would be divided between a portion still assigned to Houston and parts newly assigned to Thigpen and Zavala elementaries.

On August 15, 1996 a new building opened in its current location, 6 miles (9.7 km) from the previous one. Maheshwari convinced the parents to support the move. Due to the distance of Sam Houston from the La Paloma area, most of the students at the previous campus attended other schools closer to their houses. When the new Sam Houston campus opened, about 20% of the students had attended school at the previous campus.

South Texas College (STC) Downtown is located on the site of the former Sam Houston Elementary. As part of the 1990s moving negotiations the parents agreed to have a university campus there, as there had been an increase in enrollment at the tertiary level. STC agreed to a two-year lease from MISD.

As of 2017 the area around the former Sam Houston campus is assigned to Fields Elementary School.

== Campus ==
The school, within the Los Encinos area, is in a 58,000-square-foot (5,400 m^{2}), with 28 classrooms, on a 9.5-acre (3.8 ha) property at 93221 Olga Ave. The campus has a computer lab, custodian office, a life skills classroom, a library, a multi-purpose room, a parental involvement office, a storage room, and a science laboratory; they are housed within three wings.

== Curriculum and programs ==
A project-based curriculum was implemented after the 1996 move.

The school has an annual program, Minitropolis, a partnership with IBC Bank. On the day Minitropolis is held, students dress in professional wear and roleplay as employees, customers, citizens, and government officials in a fictional city called Minitropolis. Minitropolis was first held circa 1996.

== Feeder patterns ==
Residents of the Sam Houston zone are also zoned to Brown Middle School, and Memorial High School. Most Sam Houston graduates go to those two schools.

The portion of the Sam Houston attendance zone coinciding with that of Travis Middle School and McAllen High School consists of McAllen-Miller International Airport and empty land.
