= James "Nikki" Rowe High School =

High school in Texas

Location
- 2101 North Ware Road; McAllen, Texas; United States; 26°13′38″N 98°15′37″W

Information
- Type: Public high school
- Motto: "Warriors Now, Warriors Forever"
- Established: 1990
- School district: McAllen Independent School District
- Principal: Alfredo Gutierrez
- Teaching staff: 137.13 (FTE)
- Grades: 9–12
- Enrollment: 1,910 (2023–2024)
- Student to teacher ratio: 13.93
- Campus: Urban
- Colors: Green and Gold
- Mascot: Warrior
- Nickname: Nikki Rowe
- Yearbook: "The Legend"
- Website: http://rowe.mcallenisd.org

James "Nikki" Rowe High School is one of three high schools and the only T. E. A. recognized high school serving the McAllen, Texas area as a part of the McAllen Independent School District. It houses over 4,200 students from grades 9–12. The school originally opened in 1990, its current location is 2101 North Ware Road McAllen, Texas, United States. The school colors are green and gold and the mascot is the warrior. All athletic teams compete in the UIL District 30-6A.

The school was named after James Nicholas "Nikki" Rowe (1938–1989), who was born in McAllen, Texas to Lee Delavan and Florence (Survillo) Rowe. He grew up in McAllen and graduated from McAllen High School in 1956 before leaving for the United States Military Academy at West Point, New York. Rowe graduated from West Point in 1960 and became a United States Army officer and later one of only thirty-four American prisoners of war to escape captivity during the Vietnam War.

Nikki Rowe High School was the newest addition to the McAllen Independent School District. Nikki Rowe High School was established in 1990 as a ninth grade center, and in 1992 became a class 5A high school. Rowe High School courses include: Advanced Placement, Honors Courses, College Preparatory Courses, and regular level courses. Nikki Rowe High School was the first in McAllen to establish the ACE program—A Chance to Excel. Rowe also offers the Quest program—a search for success, and Project Stay in School. In, 2010 Nikki Rowe High School was officially recognized by Texas Education Agency, for surpassing state mandate requirement as a 30 5A District campus. The school offers many activities in the University Interscholastic League.

== Feeder patterns ==
Rowe High's feeder schools include:

- Alvarez, Castañeda, Garza, Hendricks (formerly Fifth Elementary School), McAuliffe, Perez (partial, formerly North East), Sanchez (partial, formerly North West) Seguin, and Thigpen-Zavala (partial) elementary schools
- De Leon, Fossum (partial), and Travis middle schools
