= Hombre Lobo =

Studio album by Eels
- Released: June 2, 2009
- Recorded: July–December 2008
- Studio: OneHitsville, U.S.A.; Los Feliz; California, United States
- Genre: Rock; garage rock
- Length: 40:16
- Label: E Works/Vagrant
- Producer: E

Eels chronology
Blinking Lights and Other Revelations (2005)	Hombre Lobo (2009)	End Times (2010)

Singles from Hombre Lobo
- 1. "My Timing Is Off"/"Fresh Blood" Released: April 26, 2009

Hombre Lobo: 12 Songs of Desire is the seventh studio album by American rock band Eels, released on June 2, 2009 and is the first in a trilogy of three concept albums continuing with the 2010 albums End Times and Tomorrow Morning. Hombre Lobo is Spanish for "werewolf". On March 31, 2009, the band made the track "Fresh Blood" available on Spinner.com, explaining that the song would be the lead single for the album. A documentary entitled Tremendous Dynamite was filmed to document the recording of the album. The cover art is a tribute to the famous Cuban cigar brand Cohiba.

The album is also the band's highest charting album to date on the Billboard 200, reaching number 43.

== Background ==
The songs form a concept album about lust and desire, being the first in a trilogy of three concept albums continuing with the 2010 albums End Times and Tomorrow Morning... As frontman Mark Oliver "E" Everett explained, "I wanted to write a set of songs about desire. That dreadful, intense want that gets you into all sorts of situations that can change your life in big ways." In part, the album was inspired by E's facial hair and written as a sequel to the Souljacker song "Dog Faced Boy". The character of "Dog Faced Boy" has grown up into according to E, “a horny old werewolf” and is the protagonist who experiences various types of desire throughout the songs. He said "“It occurred to me that something that seems to be lacking from so-called indie rock these days are the elements of danger and sex,"[...]"I thought, ‘It’s time to bring a little bit of that back into the mix.” In an interview with NPR on June 6, 2009, Everett stated, "That Look You Give That Guy" is his favorite song from the album.

In contrast to 2005's Blinking Lights and Other Revelations, Everett tried to compose more straightforward rock songs for Hombre Lobo. It was also the last of the trilogy to be recorded, despite being the first to be released, with E recording the album as a prequel to End Times and Tomorrow Morning.

== Release history ==
The album was released as a single CD in Europe on Polydor/Vagrant, an enhanced CD with the Tremendous Dynamite documentary in the United States through E Works/Vagrant, a deluxe edition CD with a DVD, and a limited-edition vinyl LP with gold embossing with a print run of 2,000. It is also sold digitally from the iTunes Store; pre-ordered copies receive a copy of the music video for "Prizefighter".

== Marketing ==
Prior to the album's release, Eels promoted it with music videos for "Fresh Blood" (premiered April 29), "That Look You Give That Guy" (May 14), "Prizefighter", and "In My Dreams" (July 7). The band also briefly used a Twitter account to generate hype for the album.

The live EP The Myspace Transmissions Session 2009 was also released to promote the album.

"Fresh Blood" was used in the June 2010 trailer for the third season of HBO's True Blood, as well as the ending credits of episode 11, season 3. It was also used as the closing song for the season 6 premiere episode of FX's series Rescue Me. It was also used as the theme song for the HBO docu-series The Jinx.

== Critical reception ==
Professional ratings
Aggregate scores
Source	Rating
Metacritic	70/100
Review scores
Source	Rating
AllMusic	4/5 stars
The Guardian	4/5 stars
Mojo	4/5 stars
Pitchfork	4.6/10
PopMatters	3.5/5 stars
Record Collector	4/5 stars
Spin	3/5 stars
The Times	3/5 stars
Uncut	4/5 stars

The album has a score of 70/100 on Metacritic, indicating "generally positive reviews". One negative review of the album came again from Ian Cohen of Pitchfork, who gave the album 4.6 out of 10, finding much of the album repeating previous themes present in the Eels catalogue, saying "The tracks on Hombre Lobo that aren't juke-joint pastiche sink into Everett's comfort zone of impotent longing, the trouble with dreams, and the general shittiness of putting your faith in other people."

Thom Jurek of AllMusic noted, "The sound of the album seems divided in two, the brazenly rockist set betraying the side of animal instinct in all its guises, from anger to wanton lust, desperation, and swaggering self-confidence", finding the album to be "a beautifully crafted, stripped-down recording, showcasing once more that E uses searing honesty and a canny sense of pop, rock, blues, and everything else to chronicle his own strange path through life and its labyrinth -- he combines them all with an endearing craziness that most of us feel every day, but dare not speak of."

Jake Kennedy of Record Collector called it, "Everett’s most sharply contrasting, yet accessible, work to date. For every howling rocker there’s a ballad backed with skipping drums and delicious counter melodies." Spin's Lindsay Thomas noted the gentler sides of the album" E distances himself from his lycanthropic alter ego, searching for Ms. Right backed by a familiar arsenal of winsome melodies and elegant string arrangements. The album doesn’t declare an outright winner in the “hopeless romantic versus beast” showdown, but its catchiest track is a bouncy marriage proposal (“Beginner’s Luck”) complete with church bells." Dave Simpson of The Guardian also noted the gentler sides the album conveys, seeing them as the most redeeming quality of the album, concluding "The garage rock is fun, but the mesmeric admissions of loneliness and failings make this one to return to."

Pete Paphides of The Times gave the album three stars, saying it "comes close to simulating the precise ambience of an unwashed groin. Playlists won’t be rearranging themselves to accommodate the reptilian fuzz-rock of Tremendous Dynamite and Lilac Breeze — but Mark Everett’s Captain Caveman moments are amply mitigated by a clutch of belters.", citing "That Look You Give That Guy" and "The Longing" as highlights.

== Track listing ==
All songs written by E and Kelly Logsdon, except where noted

1. "Prizefighter" – 2:53
2. "That Look You Give That Guy" – 4:15
3. "Lilac Breeze" (E) – 2:36
4. "In My Dreams" – 3:22
5. "Tremendous Dynamite" – 2:46
6. "The Longing" (E) – 4:22
7. "Fresh Blood" – 4:25
8. "What's a Fella Gotta Do" – 3:25
9. "My Timing Is Off" (E) – 2:58
10. "All the Beautiful Things" (E) – 2:22
11. "Beginner's Luck" – 3:37
12. "Ordinary Man" (E) – 3:15

== Personnel ==
=== Eels ===
- Derek Brown – drums
- E – vocals and guitar
- Kelly Logsdon – bass guitar

=== Production ===
- Autumn de Wilde – photography
- E – production
- Lisa Glines – design
- Dan "Huevos Grande" Hersch, Digiprep Mastering – mastering
- Koool G Murder – recording and mixing
- Dan Pinder – recording and mixing

== Charts ==
=== Weekly charts ===
Weekly chart performance for Hombre Lobo
Chart (2009)	Peak position
Australian Albums (ARIA)	35
Austrian Albums (Ö3 Austria)	42
Belgian Albums (Ultratop Flanders)	1
Belgian Albums (Ultratop Wallonia)	43
Canadian Albums (Chart)	10
Dutch Albums (Album Top 100)	37
European Top 100 Albums	20
French Albums (SNEP)	59
German Albums (Offizielle Top 100)	20
Irish Albums (IRMA)	24
Italian Albums (FIMI)	36
Swiss Albums (Schweizer Hitparade)	10
UK Albums (OCC)	18
US Billboard 200	43
US Top Alternative Albums (Billboard)	14
US Independent Albums (Billboard)	6
US Top Rock Albums (Billboard)	16

=== Year-end charts ===
Year-end chart performance for Hombre Lobo
Chart (2009)	Position
Belgian Albums (Ultratop Flanders)	17

== Certifications ==
Sales certifications for Hombre Lobo
Region	Certification	Certified units/sales
Belgium (BRMA)	Gold	15,000^{*}
^{*} Sales figures based on certification alone.
