= Tomorrow Morning (album) =

Studio album by Eels
- Released: August 17, 2010
- Recorded: August–December 2009
- Studio: OneHitsville, U.S.A.; Los Feliz, California, United States
- Genre: Rock; electronica
- Length: 46:20
- Label: E Works/Vagrant
- Producer: E

Eels chronology
| End Times (2010) | Tomorrow Morning (2010) | Wonderful, Glorious (2013) |

Singles from Tomorrow Morning
- 1. "Looking Up" Released: June 17, 2010

Tomorrow Morning is the ninth studio album by Eels released on August 17, 2010 and is the third in a trilogy of concept albums including Hombre Lobo (2009) and End Times (2010).

== Release ==
The album has been released on Compact Disc, a two-CD edition with a bonus EP, and a vinyl edition with the EP and a bonus 7" single. The vinyl edition was released on August 17, 2010, and the CD versions followed on August 24.

The band toured for the first time since their 2008 An Evening with Eels tour to support this release.

== Critical reception ==
Professional ratings
Review scores
| Source | Rating |
|---|---|
| AllMusic | 3.5/5 stars |
| BBC | average |
| Clash | 8/10 stars |
| The Guardian | 3/5 stars |
| NME | 7/10 stars |
| Pitchfork | 3.6/10 |
| Spin | 8/10 stars |
| Sputnikmusic | 4/5 stars |
| Slant Magazine | 2/5 stars |
| Uncut | 8/10 stars |

AllMusic wrote "While some of this album feels a bit rushed at times, as a whole Tomorrow Morning is a welcome contrast to the darkness of its predecessors, and a deft summertime pop record." Wilbur Kane of The Skinny noted the album's optimistic tone — especially in comparison to Hombre Lobo — as well as the melodic tone of "Spectacular Girl", which he compared to Beautiful Freak.

Ryan Drever of Clash, titled their review,"Uplifting and hopeful" and observed, "The final chapter in a trilogy of albums released within around six months of each other, 'Tomorrow Morning' has been self-described as E's “redemption” from the stark, emotional abyss of 'End Times' – a record dealing with his own difficult divorce. Utilizing much fuller and considerably more electronic arrangements this time around, the album is uplifting and hopeful, though no less poignant; the tender self-evaluation of 'What I Have To Offer' providing one of many particularly sweet moments."

Caroline Sullivan of The Guardian said the album "presents Everett as you've rarely heard him before: happy, fulfilled, almost optimistic. The bottomless pit of despondence that generally provides his subject matter has been supplanted by, well, not joy, exactly, but a recognition that life doesn't always suck." and noticed "Sonically, he makes more use of electronics than usual, reaching a crescendo of chirps and drum loops on the fade-out to This Is Where it Gets Good, but he's just as likely to use a church organ or distorted guitars. An intriguing addition to the Eels canon."

Stephen M. Deusner of Pitchfork, left a scathing review, "Tomorrow Morning, is far too insular to mean much of anything outside itself. It's an exercise in self-referentiality, which might be more impressive if the music didn't sound like the folk-with-beats path Beck was smart enough to avoid." and remarked on the song's more optimistic subject matter and concluded the album "meanders aimlessly through 14 songs that sound like 28." Kevin Liedel of Slant Magazine was also critical of the album, finding it to be too long and lacking depth, stating "In stark contrast to its title, Tomorrow Morning is dull, dark, and hopeless."

Jon Young of Spin praised the album saying the band tried "something different" on the album, noting its optimistic tone "He still delivers delicate ballads and frayed rockers in a wounded-beast rasp, but Everett is a changed man, scoffing at trouble in the bluesy electronica eruption “My Baby Loves Me” and tenderly extolling his sweetheart on “Spectacular Girl.” The wordless howl of delight on the exuberant gospel stomper “Looking Up” is Everett’s most compelling statement yet.

== Track listing ==
All songs written by E (Mark Oliver Everett).

1. "In Gratitude for This Magnificent Day" – 1:25
2. "I'm a Hummingbird" – 3:14
3. "The Morning" – 2:17
4. "Baby Loves Me" – 3:27
5. "Spectacular Girl" – 3:15
6. "What I Have to Offer" – 2:55
7. "This Is Where It Gets Good" – 6:18
8. "After the Earthquake" – 1:39
9. "Oh So Lovely" – 4:17
10. "The Man" – 3:51
11. "Looking Up" – 2:57
12. "That's Not Her Way" – 3:48
13. "I Like the Way This Is Going" – 2:35
14. "Mystery of Life" – 4:22

Bonus EP

1. "Swimming Lesson" – 2:55
2. "St. Elizabeth Story" – 2:29
3. "Let's Ruin Julie's Birthday" – 3:15
4. "For You" – 2:43

== Personnel ==
Eels

- The Amy Davies Choir – harmony vocals
- E – vocals, guitars, bass guitar, harmonica, piano, Optigan, Hammond B3 organ, banjo, harmonium, Vox Continental organ, drums, percussion, and production
- Knuckles – drums
- Koool G Murder – bass guitar, guitar, recording and mixing
- Tomorrow Morning Orchestra – horns

== Charts ==
=== Weekly charts ===
Sales chart performance for Tomorrow Morning
| Chart (2010) | Peak position |
|---|---|
| Australian Albums (ARIA) | 80 |
| Austrian Albums (Ö3 Austria) | 18 |
| Belgian Albums (Ultratop Flanders) | 1 |
| Belgian Albums (Ultratop Wallonia) | 28 |
| Dutch Albums (Album Top 100) | 10 |
| French Albums (SNEP) | 61 |
| German Albums (Offizielle Top 100) | 12 |
| Greek Albums (IFPI) | 17 |
| Irish Albums (IRMA) | 9 |
| Norwegian Albums (VG-lista) | 34 |
| Spanish Albums (PROMUSICAE) | 53 |
| Swiss Albums (Schweizer Hitparade) | 9 |
| UK Albums (OCC) | 18 |
| US Billboard 200 | 83 |
| US Top Rock Albums (Billboard) | 31 |

=== Year-end charts ===
Year-end chart performance for Tomorrow Morning
| Chart (2010) | Position |
|---|---|
| Belgian Albums (Ultratop Flanders) | 84 |
