= McAllen Memorial High School =

Location
- 101 East Hackberry Avenue; McAllen, Hidalgo County, Texas 78501; United States; 26°12′35″N 98°12′59″W

Information
- Type: Public High School
- Opened: 1980
- School district: McAllen Independent School District
- NCES School ID: 482967005548
- Principal: Ramiro Castillo Jr.
- Teaching staff: Pap (FTE)
- Grades: 9-12
- Enrollment: 99028481(2023-24)
- Student to teacher ratio: 13.11
- Colors: Columbia blue and gold
- Athletics conference: UIL 5A
- Mascot: Mustang
- Nickname: The Mighty Mustangs
- Rivals: McAllen Highschool (Bulldogs)
- Website: memorial.mcallenisd.org

McAllen Memorial High School is one of five high schools serving the McAllen, Texas area as a part of the McAllen Independent School District. It houses over 2,000 students from grades 9-12. Before the establishment of Memorial High School, the school and its building were originally opened and operated as Brown Middle School. The high school opened in 1980, at its current location, 101 East Hackberry Avenue McAllen, Texas, United States. The school colors are Columbia blue and bright gold and the mascot is a mustang.

== Demographics ==
As of the 2023-2024 school year, the demographics of McAllen Memorial is 94.47% Hispanic, 3.16% white, 1.36% Asian, 0.63% Black, and 0.29% two or more races. 68.34% of students at McAllen Memorial are eligible to receive free or reduced lunch.

== History ==
Memorial High School began in 1980, renovations were made to the Health Clinic, Assistant Principal offices, Attendance office, Auditorium in 1999.

== Campus ==
The high school lies on 39.39 acres of land, there are currently 100 permanent classrooms and 3 portable classrooms. Along with the classrooms, Memorial has a football stadium, gym, and weight room.

== Feeder patterns ==
McAllen Memorial High's feeder schools include:

- Bonham, Escandon, Gonzales, Houston, Jackson, Milam (partial), and Roosevelt elementary schools
- Dr. Rodney D. Cathey Middle School, Homer J. Morris Middle School (formerly), and Dorothea Brown Middle School
