= The Deconstruction =

Studio album by Eels
- Released: April 6, 2018
- Recorded: May 2017 – February 2018
- Studios: The Compound, Los Feliz, California, U.S.; The Pie, Pasadena, California, U.S.
- Genre: Indie rock
- Length: 42:06
- Labels: EWorks; PIAS
- Producers: E; Mickey Petralia

Eels chronology
The Complete DreamWorks Albums (2015)	The Deconstruction (2018)	Earth to Dora (2020)

The Deconstruction is the twelfth studio album by American rock band Eels, released on April 6, 2018. The band's twelfth studio release follows a four-year period where front man Mark Oliver "E" Everett took a hiatus from music. The album has garnered favourable reviews.

== Recording ==
The Deconstruction is the first Eels studio album in four years; Everett was burned out after touring and recording with the band's previous releases and considered retiring from music. In the interim, he made a few public performances, acted in the Netflix original series Love, and went through a marriage, the birth of his first son, and divorce. Lyrically, the album focuses on reconciliation. The song "Archie Goodnight" is written for Everett's son Archie. The songs were recorded sporadically across that time and without the intent of making an album, on Everett's personal schedule.

== Promotion and release ==
When the album was announced, the title track was made available for streaming. The band shared "Today Is the Day" on February 8, "Premonition" on March 14, and "Bone Dry" on March 28. A music video for "Bone Dry" was released the same day as the album.

== Reception ==
Professional ratings
Aggregate scores
Source	Rating
Metacritic	72/100
Review scores
Source	Rating
American Songwriter	4.5/5 stars
The Arts Desk	3/5 stars
Drowned in Sound	7/10
Exclaim!	6/10
The Irish Times	2/5 stars
Pitchfork	3.0/10
Under the Radar	5.5/10

The Deconstruction received generally positive reviews from music critics. At Metacritic, which assigns a normalised rating out of 100 to reviews from mainstream critics, the album has an average score of 72 based on 18 reviews, indicating "generally favorable reviews". Under the Radar's Matt the Raven gave the album 5.5 out of 10, praising the album's wit and humor but decrying how long the album is, concluding that the release, "gets off to an energetic start with tracks that rock and inspire, ultimately there's too many tracks that don't rock, so it falls a bit short of what Eels are capable of". Javi Fedrick of The Arts Desk gave the album a mixed review, praising the lush instrumentation but calling it, "disjointed as a whole".

In American Songwriter, Hal Horowitz gave the album 4.5 out of five stars, summing up his review, "The album is somewhat of a musical and philosophical rollercoaster. But that’s all in a day’s work for Everett who adds to his already impressive, uncompromising catalog with another expressive, rugged and diverse gem. It’s not always an easy listen but anything worthwhile generally isn’t and kudos to Everett for having the guts and musical fortitude to pull it off... as he always has." In Exclaim!, Ian Gormley gave the album a six out of 10, criticizing the lyrics and summarizing his review, "For now, The Deconstruction is a rather rote and lacklustre return".

In a review giving two out of five stars, Dean Van Nguyen of The Irish Times called the album "more of the same", criticizing the release for not adding to Eels' prior albums, calling it a "typical Eels record to add to the stack." Pitchfork's Ian Cohen wrote a scathing review saying, "Everett trots out his reflexive self-loathing and elementary rhyme schemes one more time, with no clear reason why" and peppers most of his review with sentences taken directly from previous Pitchfork reviews of Eels albums such as "it leaves little to the imagination for anyone who’s followed Eels to this point" and summarizing "The Deconstruction produces no eccentricity, pop smarts, orchestral creativity, or emotional revelation". Jamie Otsa of Drowned in Sound gave the album a seven out of 10, agreeing that the quality was uneven, calling it, "a confusing jumble of highs and lows that perhaps reflects the chaotic nature of the mind behind the record's creation" but praising the album's many tonal and mood shifts.

== Track listing ==
1. "The Deconstruction" (E, Koool G Murder) – 4:10
2. "Bone Dry" (E, Murder) – 3:42
3. "The Quandary" (E) – 0:54
4. "Premonition" (E, Murder) – 3:12
5. "Rusty Pipes" (E, Murder) – 4:04
6. "The Epiphany" (E, Murder) – 2:18
7. "Today Is the Day" (E, P-Boo) – 3:03
8. "Sweet Scorched Earth" (E) – 3:02
9. "Coming Back" (E) – 0:58
10. "Be Hurt" (E, Murder) – 3:59
11. "You Are the Shining Light" (E, Murder) – 3:39
12. "There I Said It" (E) – 2:50
13. "Archie Goodnight" (E) – 0:48
14. "The Unanswerable" (E, Murder) – 2:08
15. "In Our Cathedral" (E) – 3:19

== Personnel ==
- E – guitar, vocals, production
- Koool G Murder – bass guitar
- P-Boo – guitar, bass guitar, keyboards, drums
- with The Deconstruction Orchestra & Choir

== Charts ==
=== Weekly charts ===
Chart (2018)	Peak position
Austrian Albums (Ö3 Austria)	6
Belgian Albums (Ultratop Flanders)	1
Belgian Albums (Ultratop Wallonia)	22
Dutch Albums (Album Top 100)	16
French Albums (SNEP)	19
German Albums (Offizielle Top 100)	4
Irish Albums (IRMA)	17
Italian Albums (FIMI)	96
Scottish Albums (Official Charts)	7
Spanish Albums (PROMUSICAE)	33
Swiss Albums (Schweizer Hitparade)	5
UK Albums (Official Charts)	10

=== Year-end charts ===
Chart (2018)	Position
Belgian Albums (Ultratop Flanders)	42
