= McAllen High School =

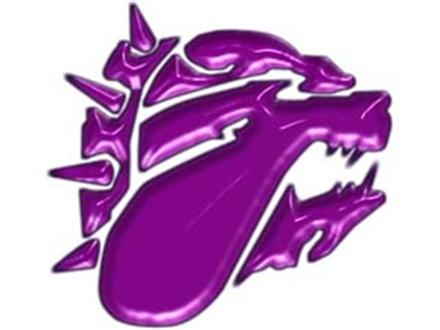

Location
- 2021 La Vista Avenue; McAllen, Texas; United States; 26.2265°N 98.2384°W

Information
- Type: Public high school
- Motto: "In Unity our Spirit Grows"
- Established: 1909
- School district: McAllen Independent School District
- NCES School ID: 482967003339
- Principal: Albert Canales
- Teaching staff: 179.53 (on an FTE basis)
- Grades: 9–12
- Enrollment: 2,152 (2023-2024)
- Student to teacher ratio: 11.99
- Campus: Urban
- Colors: Purple and Gold
- Athletics conference: UIL 5A
- Nickname: Bulldogs
- Newspaper: The Wheel
- Yearbook: El Espejo
- Website: mchi.mcallenisd.org

McAllen High School is one of four high schools serving the McAllen, Texas area as a part of the McAllen Independent School District. It houses approximately 2200 students from grades 9–12. The school originally opened in 1909 and moved to its current location at 2021 La Vista Avenue in 1963. The school colors are purple and gold and the mascot is a bulldog. All athletic teams compete in the UIL Class 5A Division I

== History ==
McAllen High School began with a class of only fourteen students in 1909, its first graduating class, consisting of only four students, received their diplomas in 1913. With the expansion of the City of McAllen, and the growth of student population, it became necessary to construct a new campus. As a result, McAllen High School was relocated to its present location in 1963.

Built to accommodate 2,000 students in grades 9 through 12, the new high school was occupied by 2,400 students in the fall of 1963. The new property was purchased with the vision for expansion on a 40-acre (16 ha) tract. Thus, McAllen High School evolved from an old air style, over-crowded school building to a modern air conditioned building supported by its own natural gas turbine generators.

Initially, although obsolete, the old campus was maintained for instructing "migrant students". By 1973, however, the "migrant student" population had grown to more than 1,000 and school board officials decided to mainstream migrant students. Accordingly, the old property was sold to the McAllen State Bank and in 1976, the original campus was torn down. Today, the grounds of the old high school and stadium feature a banking and office center.

== Sports ==
The McHi Bulldogs and Lady Bulldogs compete in the following sports:

- Football
- Volleyball
- Cross-Country
- Basketball
- Wrestling
- Soccer
- Swimming
- Tennis
- Softball
- Golf
- Track & Field
- Baseball
- Marching Band

== Notable alumni ==
- 1951: Johnny Economedes, firefighter and rescue worker; Edinburg's Johnny G. Economedes High School is named for him
- 1956: Col. James Nicholas "Nikki" Rowe, Vietnam POW; James "Nikki" Rowe High School is named after him
- 1957: Ted Uhlaender, Major League Baseball player and coach
- 1960: Charles P. Nemfakos, Deputy Under Secretary of the U.S. Navy
- 1963: Susan Elizabeth Norris (Moon), best-selling science fiction writer
- 1965: Pete Benavides, United States federal judge, appointed by Bill Clinton
- 1972: Robert Roy Pool, Hollywood screenwriter
- 1973: Catherine Hardwicke, movie director and production designer (The Nativity Story, Thirteen, and Twilight)
- 1976: Michael E. Fossum, NASA Space Shuttle astronaut; Fossum Middle School is named for him
- 1999: Rolando Cantu, NFL football player, Arizona Cardinals
- 2018: Shaine Casas, competitive swimmer, U.S. national team member, U.S. national champion

== McHi Band ==
In the 1960s the McHi band was selected as the Texas TMEA 4-A Honor Band.

During the 1970s, the McHi band continued a string of Sweepstakes Awards. This string of victories continued to present day. In 2004, the McHi marching band advanced to State, being the first and only time in the schools history.

== Feeder patterns ==
McAllen High's feeder schools include:

- Crockett, Fields, Milam (partial), Navarro, Perez (partial, formerly North East), Rayburn, Sanchez (partial, formerly North West), Thigpen-Zavala (partial), and Wilson elementary schools – the portion coinciding with Sam Houston Elementary consists of McAllen-Miller International Airport and empty land.
- Fossum (partial), Morris, Lamar (former), Lincoln (former), and Travis middle schools
