= McAllen Independent School District =

School district in Texas, United States

Address
- 2000 North 23rd Street McAllen, Texas, 78501; United States

District information
- Grades: PK–12
- Schools: 31
- NCES District ID: 4829670

Students and staff
- Students: 20,095 (2023–2024)
- Teachers: 1,531.41 (on an FTE basis)
- Student–teacher ratio: 13.12:1

Other information
- Website: www.mcallenisd.org

The McAllen Independent School District is a school district headquartered in the city of McAllen, Texas, United States.

In 2009, the school district was rated "academically acceptable" by the Texas Education Agency.

== Schools ==
The campuses of the MISD include 5 high schools, 6 middle schools, and 18 elementary schools. Achieve Early College and Lamar Academy are ranked among the best schools in the nation, with Lamar being a top 10-ranked high school.

=== High schools ===
- Achieve Early College High School
- McAllen High School
- McAllen Memorial High School
- Lamar Academy
- James "Nikki" Rowe High School

=== Middle schools ===
- Brown Middle School
- Cathey Middle School
- De Leon Middle School
- Fossum Middle School
- Morris Middle School
- Travis Middle School

=== Elementary schools ===
- Alvarez Elementary School
- Castañeda Elementary School
- Escandon Elementary School
- Fields Elementary School
- Garza Elementary School
- Gonzalez Elementary School
- Hendricks Elementary
- Houston Elementary School
- Jackson Elementary School
- McAuliffe Elementary School
- Milam Elementary School
- Perez Elementary
- Rayburn Elementary School
- Roosevelt Elementary School
- Seguin Elementary School
- Sanchez Elementary School
- Thigpen-Zavala Elementary School
- Wilson Elementary School

== See also ==
- List of school districts in Texas
