= Paramore discography =

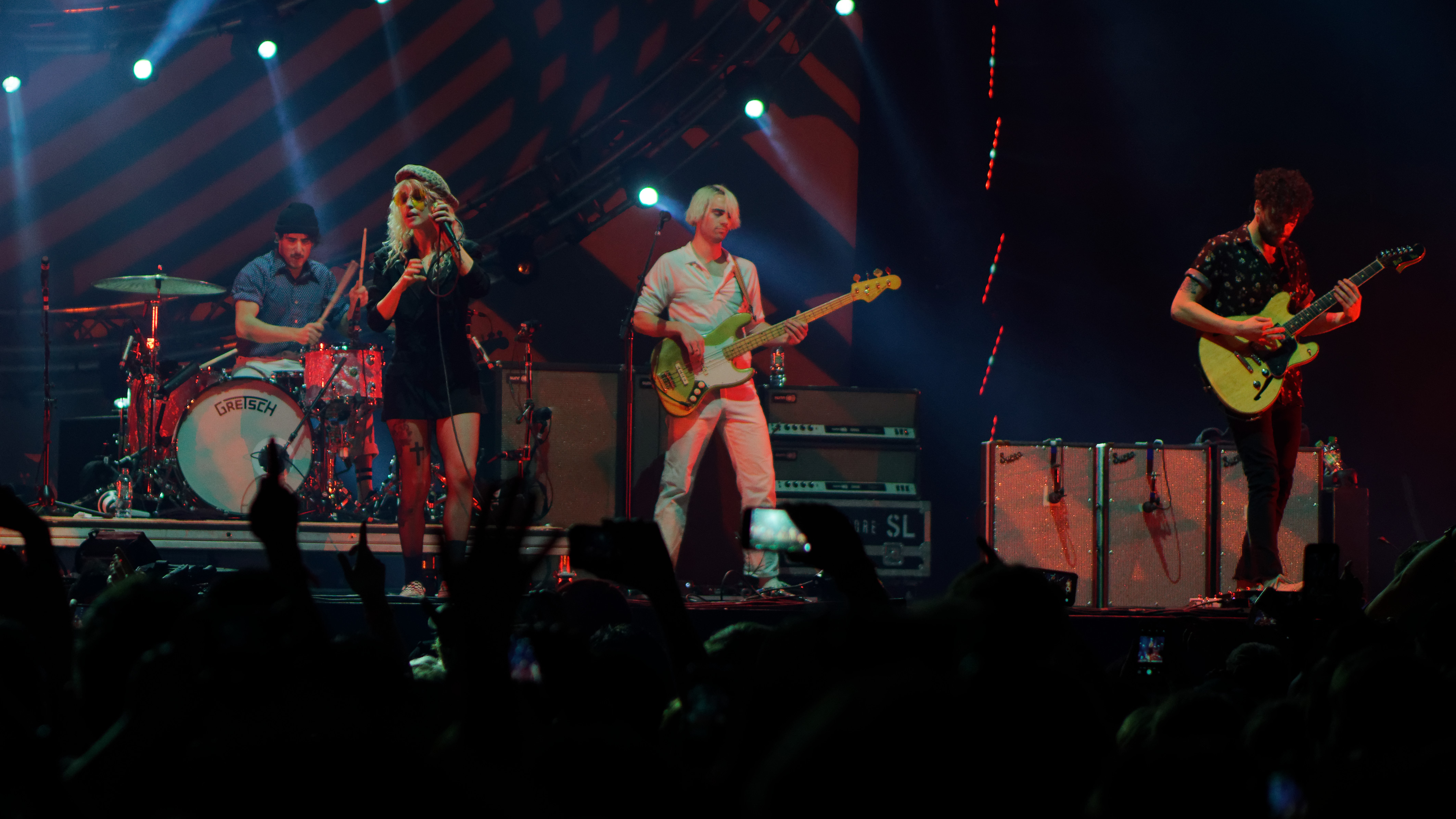
- Paramore performing on their After Laughter Tour in 2018
- Studio albums: 6
- Extended plays: 5
- Live albums: 2
- Singles: 28
- Music videos: 30
- Remix albums: 1

The American rock band Paramore has released six studio albums, five extended plays, two live albums, one remix album, twenty-eight singles, one video album, and thirty music videos. The band was formed in Franklin, Tennessee, in 2004 by lead vocalist Hayley Williams with guitarists Josh Farro and Taylor York, bassist Jeremy Davis, and drummer Zac Farro. In 2005, Paramore signed with the New York City-based Fueled by Ramen and released their debut album entitled All We Know Is Falling. Three singles were released from the album, but none of them charted. The album did not chart in the Billboard 200 either, although it peaked at number thirty in the Billboard Top Heatseekers. All We Know Is Falling received gold certification in the United Kingdom and in August 2025 the RIAA certified the album platinum in the United States.

The band's breakthrough album came in 2007 with Riot!. After its release in June, the album peaked at number fifteen on the Billboard 200 album chart and received multiple certifications all over the world, including triple platinum in the United States. The lead single, "Misery Business", became their first charting single in the Billboard Hot 100, certified single, and in 2015, the band's first to be certified triple platinum in the United States. Paramore contributed to the Twilight film soundtrack in 2008 recording of two original songs, including the single "Decode". In 2009, the band released their third studio album Brand New Eyes, which debuted and peaked at number two in the United States, was the number one album in several other countries, including Australia and the United Kingdom, and was certified platinum in the United States in March 2016. The album produced five singles, including "Ignorance" and "The Only Exception", who both received certifications in numerous countries. In 2013, the band released their fourth album Paramore, which peaked at number one in many countries and was certified platinum in the United States in March 2016. The singles "Still Into You" and "Ain't It Fun" both became radio hits, while the latter also became the band's first top ten single on Billboard Hot 100 chart. The band released their fifth album, After Laughter in 2017 and their sixth album, This Is Why in 2023.

== Albums ==
=== Studio albums ===
Title	Album details	Peak chart positions										Sales	Certifications
Title	Album details	US	AUS	AUT	CAN	FIN	GER	IRL	NLD	NZ	UK	Sales	Certifications
All We Know Is Falling	Released: July 26, 2005; Label: Fueled by Ramen; Formats: CD, LP, digital download	— (Note: All We Know Is Falling did not enter the US Billboard 200, but peaked at number 30 on the US Heatseekers Albums Chart.)	—	—	—	—	—	—	—	—	51	US: 500,000	RIAA: Platinum; ARIA: Gold; BPI: Gold
Riot!	Released: June 12, 2007; Label: Fueled by Ramen; Formats: CD, LP, digital download	15	47	66	—	26	—	53	61	15	24	US: 1,400,000; UK: 528,573	RIAA: 3× Platinum; ARIA: Platinum; BPI: 2× Platinum; MC: Gold; RMNZ: Platinum
Brand New Eyes	Released: September 29, 2009; Label: Fueled by Ramen; Formats: CD, LP, digital download	2	1	6	3	5	7	1	23	1	1	US: 770,000; UK: 511,800	RIAA: Platinum; ARIA: Platinum; BPI: 2× Platinum; MC: Gold; RMNZ: 3× Platinum
Paramore	Released: April 5, 2013; Label: Fueled by Ramen, Atlantic; Formats: CD, LP, digital download	1	1	13	3	10	8	1	18	1	1	US: 106,000; UK: 188,597	RIAA: Platinum; ARIA: Gold; BPI: Platinum; MC: Platinum; RMNZ: 2× Platinum
After Laughter	Released: May 12, 2017; Label: Fueled by Ramen, Atlantic; Formats: CD, LP, CS, digital download	6	3	10	9	14	18	4	17	7	4	US: 53,000; UK: 154,834	RIAA: Gold; BPI: Gold; RMNZ: Platinum
This Is Why	Released: February 10, 2023; Label: Atlantic; Formats: CD, LP, CS, digital download	2	1	16	8	20	6	2	22	3	1	US: 47,000; UK: 21,093	BPI: Silver
"—" denotes a recording that did not chart.

=== Live albums ===
Title	Album details	Peak chart positions				Certifications
Title	Album details	US	AUS	FIN	UK	Certifications
Live in the UK 2008	Released: January 29, 2008; Label: Fueled by Ramen; Formats: CDr, digital download	—	—	—	—	
The Final Riot!	Released: November 25, 2008; Label: Fueled by Ramen; Formats: CD, DVD, Blu-ray, digital download	88	38	31	153	RIAA: Gold; BPI: Gold; MC: Platinum
"—" denotes a recording that did not chart.

=== Remix albums ===
Title	Album details	Peak chart positions
Title	Album details	US Sales
Re: This Is Why	Released: October 6, 2023; Label: Atlantic; Formats: Digital download	41

== Extended plays ==
Title	EP details
The Summer Tic	Released: June 18, 2006; Label: Fueled by Ramen; Formats: CD, digital download
2010 Summer Tour	Released: August 10, 2010; Label: Fueled by Ramen; Formats: CD, digital download
The Only Exception	Released: September 28, 2010; Label: Fueled by Ramen; Formats: CD, digital download
Singles Club	Released: December 14, 2011; Label: Fueled by Ramen; Formats: Digital download, LP
The Holiday Sessions	Released: April 20, 2013; Format: 7" vinyl
Ain't It Fun Remixes	Released: June 24, 2014; Formats: digital download

== Singles ==
List of singles, with selected chart positions and certifications, showing year released and album name
Title	Year	Peak chart positions										Sales	Certifications	Album
Title	Year	US	US Rock	AUS	CAN	FIN	GER	IRE	NLD	NZ	UK	Sales	Certifications	Album
"Pressure"	2005	— (Note: "Pressure" did not enter the Billboard Hot 100, but peaked at number 62 on the Digital Song Sales chart.)	—	—	—	—	—	—	—	—	—		RIAA: Platinum	All We Know Is Falling
"Emergency"	2005	—	—	—	—	—	—	—	—	—	—		RIAA: Gold	All We Know Is Falling
"All We Know"	2006	—	—	—	—	—	—	—	—	—	—			All We Know Is Falling
"Misery Business"	2007	26	24	65	67	—	79	—	56	—	17	UK: 1,000,000	RIAA: 6× Platinum; ARIA: 3× Platinum; BPI: 3× Platinum; RMNZ: 2× Platinum	Riot!
"Hallelujah"	2007	—	—	—	—	—	—	—	—	—	139			Riot!
"Crushcrushcrush"	2007	54	— (Note: "Crushcrushcrush" did not enter the Hot Rock & Alternative Songs chart, but peaked at number 4 on the Alternative Airplay chart.)	—	—	4	—	—	—	32	61		RIAA: Platinum; BPI: Gold; RMNZ: Gold	Riot!
"That's What You Get"	2008	66	— (Note: "That's What You Get" did not enter the Hot Rock & Alternative Songs chart, but peaked at number 36 on the Alternative Airplay chart.)	—	92	— (Note: "That's What You Get" did not enter the Finnish Singles Chart, but peaked at number 25 on the Finland Download Chart.)	—	—	— (Note: "That's What You Get" did not enter the Netherlands' Single Top 100, but peaked at number 8 on the Dutch Tipparade Chart.)	35	55		RIAA: Platinum; BPI: Gold; RMNZ: Platinum	Riot!
"Decode"	2008	33	— (Note: "Decode" did not enter the Hot Rock & Alternative Songs chart, but peaked at number 5 on the Alternative Airplay chart.)	12	48	9	47	—	— (Note: "Decode" did not enter the Netherlands' Single Top 100, but peaked at number 12 on the Dutch Tipparade Chart.)	15	52		RIAA: 2× Platinum; ARIA: Gold; BPI: Platinum; RMNZ: Platinum	Twilight: Original Motion Picture Soundtrack
"Ignorance"	2009	67	20	35	96	— (Note: "Ignorance" did not enter the Finnish Singles Chart, but peaked at number 29 on the Finland Download Chart.)	42	49	— (Note: "Ignorance" did not enter the Netherlands' Single Top 100, but peaked at number 14 on the Dutch Tipparade Chart.)	32	14		RIAA: Gold; ARIA: Platinum; BPI: Platinum; RMNZ: Platinum	Brand New Eyes
"Brick by Boring Brick"	2009	— (Note: "Brick by Boring Brick" did not enter the Billboard Hot 100, but peaked at number 25 on the Hot Singles Sales chart.)	20	85	—	—	—	—	95	29	85		BPI: Gold; RMNZ: Platinum	Brand New Eyes
"The Only Exception"	2010	24	— (Note: "The Only Exception" did not enter the Hot Rock & Alternative Songs chart, but peaked at number 1 on the Rock Digital Songs chart.)	17	25	—	—	28	— (Note: "The Only Exception" did not enter the Netherlands' Single Top 100, but peaked at number 8 on the Dutch Tipparade Chart.)	13	31		RIAA: 2× Platinum; ARIA: 2× Platinum; BPI: Platinum; RMNZ: 2× Platinum	Brand New Eyes
"Careful"	2010	78	— (Note: "Careful" did not enter the Hot Rock & Alternative Songs chart, but peaked at number 37 on the Alternative Airplay chart.)	89	— (Note: "Careful" did not enter the Billboard Canadian Hot 100, but peaked at number 63 on the Hot Canadian Digital Song Sales chart.)	—	—	—	—	—	108			Brand New Eyes
"Playing God"	2010	—	—	—	—	—	—	—	—	—	103			Brand New Eyes
"Monster"	2011	36	38	56	55	— (Note: "Monster" did not enter the Finnish Singles Chart, but peaked at number 25 on the Finland OVI Music Chart.)	—	—	—	23	22		RIAA: Gold; BPI: Silver	Transformers: Dark of the Moon – The Album
"Now"	2013	— (Note: "Now" did not enter the Billboard Hot 100, but peaked at number 3 on the Bubbling Under Hot 100 Singles chart, which acts as an extension to the Hot 100.)	16	86	—	—	—	—	—	—	39			Paramore
"Still Into You"	2013	24	6	5	58	—	—	6	—	14	15	UK: 952,000	RIAA: 2× Platinum; ARIA: 5× Platinum; BPI: 2× Platinum; MC: 3× Platinum; RMNZ: 3× Platinum	Paramore
"Daydreaming"	2013	—	—	—	—	—	—	—	—	—	— (Note: "Daydreaming" did not enter the UK Singles Chart, but peaked at number 33 on the UK Rock & Metal Singles Chart.)			Paramore
"Ain't It Fun"	2014	10	1	32	27	— (Note: "Ain't It Fun" did not enter the Finnish Singles Chart, but peaked at number 10 on the Finland Radio Chart.)	—	55	— (Note: "Ain't It Fun" did not enter the Netherlands' Single Top 100, but peaked at number 17 on the Dutch Tipparade Chart.)	—	143		RIAA: 3× Platinum; ARIA: 2× Platinum; BPI: Platinum; MC: 2× Platinum; RMNZ: 3× Platinum	Paramore
"Hard Times"	2017	90	6	61	65	— (Note: "Hard Times" did not enter the Finnish Singles Chart, but peaked at number 13 on the Finland Download Chart.)	—	54	— (Note: "Hard Times" did not enter the Netherlands' Single Top 100, but peaked at number 26 on the Netherlands' Single Tip Chart.)	— (Note: "Hard Times" did not enter the NZ Top 40 Singles Chart, but peaked at number 2 on the NZ Heatseeker Singles Chart.)	34	UK: 675,000	RIAA: Gold; ARIA: Platinum; BPI: 2× Platinum; RMNZ: 2× Platinum	After Laughter
"Told You So"	2017	—	16	—	—	—	—	—	—	— (Note: "Told You So" did not enter the NZ Top 40 Singles Chart, but peaked at number 7 on the NZ Heatseeker Singles Chart.)	— (Note: "Told You So" did not enter the UK Singles Chart, but peaked at number 84 on the UK Singles Sales Chart.)			After Laughter
"Fake Happy"	2017	—	33	—	—	—	—	—	—	—	—			After Laughter
"Rose-Colored Boy"	2018	—	27	—	—	—	—	—	—	— (Note: "Rose-Colored Boy" did not enter the NZ Top 40 Singles Chart, but peaked at number 6 on the NZ Heatseeker Singles Chart.)	—		BPI: Silver	After Laughter
"Caught in the Middle"	2018	—	—	—	—	—	—	—	—	—	—			After Laughter
"This Is Why"	2022	— (Note: "This Is Why" did not enter the Billboard Hot 100, but peaked at number 8 on the Bubbling Under Hot 100 Singles chart, which acts as an extension to the Hot 100.)	15	—	—	—	—	90	—	— (Note: "This Is Why" did not enter the NZ Top 40 Singles Chart, but peaked at number 8 on the NZ Hot Singles Chart.)	61		RIAA: Gold	This Is Why
"The News"	2022	—	34	—	—	—	—	—	—	— (Note: "The News" did not enter the NZ Top 40 Singles Chart, but peaked at number 33 on the NZ Hot Singles Chart.)	— (Note: "The News" did not enter the UK Singles Chart, but peaked at number 9 on the UK Physical Singles Chart.)			This Is Why
"C'est Comme Ça"	2023	—	37	—	—	—	—	—	—	—	— (Note: "C'est Comme Ça" did not enter the UK Singles Chart, but peaked at number 10 on the UK Physical Singles Chart.)			This Is Why
"Running Out of Time"	2023	—	18	—	—	—	—	—	—	— (Note: "Running Out of Time" did not enter the NZ Top 40 Singles Chart, but peaked at number 18 on the NZ Hot Singles Chart.)	74			This Is Why
"Burning Down the House"	2024	—	46	—	—	—	—	—	—	—	— (Note: "Burning Down the House" did not enter the UK Singles Chart, but peaked at number 19 on the UK Singles Sales Chart.)			Everyone's Getting Involved
"—" denotes releases that did not chart or were not released in that territory.

== Other charted and certified songs ==
List of songs, with selected chart positions and certifications, showing year released and album name
Title	Year	Peak chart positions					Certifications	Album
Title	Year	US Rock	NZ	POL Air	UK Stream.	UK Rock	Certifications	Album
"All I Wanted"	2009	—	—	—	—	18	BPI: Silver; RMNZ: Gold	Brand New Eyes
"Looking Up"	2009	—	—	—	—	33		Brand New Eyes
"Misguided Ghosts"	2009	—	—	—	—	37		Brand New Eyes
"Where the Lines Overlap"	2009	—	—	—	—	40		Brand New Eyes
"Turn It Off"	2009	—	—	—	—	6		Brand New Eyes
"Fast in My Car"	2013	—	—	—	95	—		Paramore
"Grow Up"	2013	—	—	—	—	36		Paramore
"Hate to See Your Heart Break"	2014	23	—	—	—	—		Paramore
"Tell Me It's Okay"	2014	—	—	—	—	17		Paramore: Self-Titled Deluxe
"Escape Route"	2014	—	—	—	—	27		Paramore: Self-Titled Deluxe
"Native Tongue"	2014	—	—	—	—	36		Paramore: Self-Titled Deluxe
"Forgiveness"	2017	35	— (Note: "Forgiveness" did not enter the NZ Top 40 Singles Chart, but peaked at number seven on the NZ Heatseekers Chart.)	—	—	—		After Laughter
"26"	2017	47	—	—	—	—		After Laughter
"Pool"	2017	50	—	—	—	—		After Laughter
"Big Man, Little Dignity"	2023	34	— (Note: "Big Man, Little Dignity" did not enter the NZ Top 40 Singles Chart, but peaked at number 26 on the NZ Hot Singles Chart.)	—	—	—		This Is Why
"You First"	2023	32	— (Note: "You First" did not enter the NZ Top 40 Singles Chart, but peaked at number 25 on the NZ Hot Singles Chart.)	—	—	—		This Is Why
"Figure 8"	2023	36	— (Note: "Figure 8" did not enter the NZ Top 40 Singles Chart, but peaked at number 28 on the NZ Hot Singles Chart.)	—	—	—		This Is Why
"Liar"	2023	40	—	—	—	—		This Is Why
"Crave"	2023	42	—	—	—	—		This Is Why
"Thick Skull"	2023	45	—	—	—	—		This Is Why
"You First" (Re: Remi Wolf)	2023	—	—	104	—	—		Re: This Is Why
"—" denotes releases that did not chart or were not released in that territory.

== Video compilations ==
Title	Video details
Paramore's Videos. All of Them. Ever.	Released: July 24, 2015; Label: Atlantic; Formats: Digital

== Music videos ==
Title	Year	Director(s)
"Pressure"	2005	Shane Drake
"Emergency"	2006	Shane Drake
"All We Know"	2006	Dan Dobi
"Misery Business"	2007	Shane Drake
"Hallelujah"	2007	Big TV!
"Crushcrushcrush"	2007	Shane Drake
"That's What You Get"	2008	Marcos Siega
"Decode"	2008	Shane Drake
"Ignorance"	2009	Honey
"Brick by Boring Brick"	2009	Meiert Avis
"The Only Exception"	2010	Brandon Chesbro
"Careful"	2010	Brandon Chesbro
"Playing God"	2010	Brandon Chesbro
"Monster"	2011	Shane Drake
"Now"	2013	Daniel "Cloud" Campos
"Still into You"	2013	Isaac Rentz
"Anklebiters"	2013	Jordan Brune
"Daydreaming"	2013	Julian Acosta
"Ain't It Fun"	2014	Sophia Peer
"Last Hope" (Live)	2014	Michael Thelin
"Hate to See Your Heart Break" (featuring Joy Williams)	2014	Chuck David Willis
"Hard Times"	2017	Andrew Joffe
"Told You So"	2017	Zac Farro & Aaron Joseph
"Fake Happy"	2017	Zac Farro
"Rose-Colored Boy"	2018	Warren Fu
"Caught in the Middle"	2018	Computer Team
"This Is Why"	2022	Brendan Yates
"The News"	2022	Mike Kluge & Matthew DeLisi
"Running Out of Time"	2023	Ivanna Borin
"Thick Skull"	2024	Brendan Yates
