= List of songs recorded by Paramore =

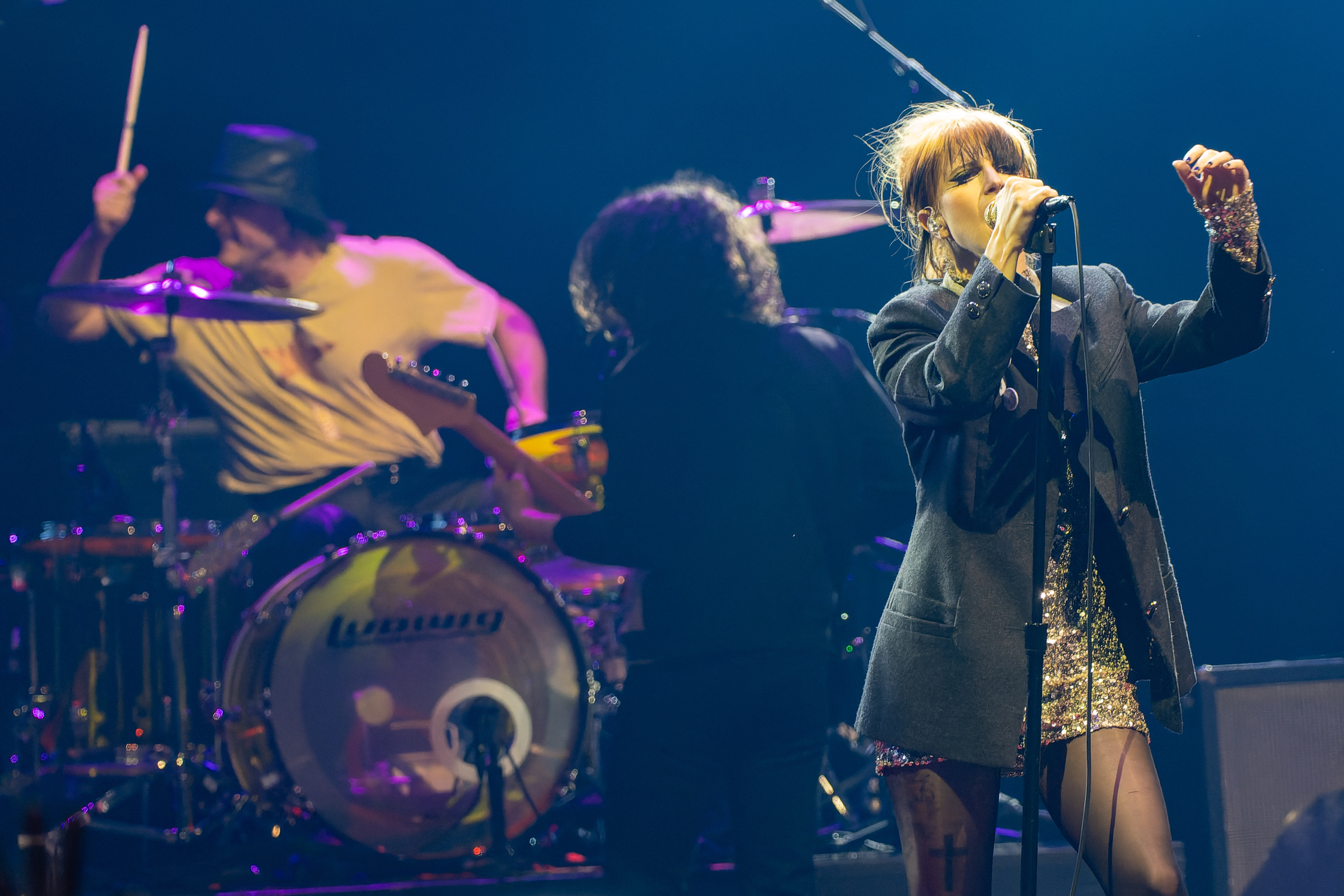
From left to right: Zac Farro, Taylor York and Hayley Williams of Paramore, performing in London in 2023

American rock band Paramore have recorded songs for six studio albums, a box set, an extended play and two soundtrack albums. In 2002, at age 13, vocalist Hayley Williams moved to Franklin, Tennessee, where she met brothers Josh Farro and Zac Farro. The band was officially formed by Josh Farro (lead guitar and backing vocals), Zac Farro (drums), Jeremy Davis (bass guitar) and Hayley Williams (lead vocals) in 2004, with the later addition of Williams' neighbor Jason Bynum (rhythm guitar). In 2005, Paramore signed with the New York City-based Fueled by Ramen but Davis would soon after leave, and be replaced with John Hembree. The band released their debut album entitled All We Know Is Falling that year. Three singles were released to promote the album. Davis would rejoin shortly after.

Bynum left the band in 2005. Hunter lamb replaced Bynum in 2006 but later left the band. Davis would be removed from the band for a second time, but shortly rejoined once more. Taylor York, who had been in a band with the Farro brothers before the two met Hayley Williams, joined as a touring guitarist in 2007. The band released their second album, Riot!, in 2007. The lead single, "Misery Business", became their first charting single in the Billboard Hot 100 and certified single. The next year, Paramore contributed to the Twilight film soundtrack with two original songs, including the hit single "Decode".

In 2009, the band released their third studio album, also announcing that York would become an official member, Brand New Eyes. Williams and Josh Farro wrote most of the songs together, while York had writing credits in some of them. After promotion for Brand New Eyes ended, the Farro brothers announced their departure of the band in 2010. In 2011, Paramore recorded an original song for the Transformers: Dark of the Moon film soundtrack and released a box set entitled Singles Club with three original songs, "In The Mourning", "Renegade", and "Hello Cold World". In 2013, they released their fourth studio album, Paramore, which debuted at number one on Billboard 200. The album produced two of Paramore's biggest hits "Still into You" and "Ain't It Fun". Davis would later leave in 2015 but Zac Farro would return in 2017. In May 2017, they released their fifth album After Laughter. Four singles have been released for this album, "Hard Times", "Told You So", "Fake Happy", and "Rose-Colored Boy".

The band returned after a four-year hiatus with their single "This Is Why" on September 28, 2022, from their 2023 album of the same name. The full album was released on February 10, 2023.

== Songs ==
Key
†	Indicates single release

Song	Writer(s)	Release(s)	Year	Ref.
"26"	Hayley Williams; Taylor York	After Laughter	2017	
"Ain't It Fun" †	Williams; York	Paramore	2013	
"All I Wanted"	Williams; York	Brand New Eyes	2009	
"All We Know" †	Williams; Josh Farro	All We Know is Falling	2005	
"Anklebiters"	Williams; York; Justin Meldal-Johnsen	Paramore	2013	
"Be Alone"	Williams; York	Paramore	2013	
"Big Man, Little Dignity"	Williams; York	This Is Why	2023	
"Born For This"	Williams; J. Farro	Riot!	2007	
"Brick by Boring Brick" †	Williams; J. Farro	Brand New Eyes	2009	
"Brighter"	Williams; J. Farro	All We Know is Falling	2005	
"Burning Down the House"	David Byrne; Chris Frantz; Jerry Harrison; Tina Weymouth	Stop Making Sense: a Tribute Album	2024	
"Careful" †	Williams; J. Farro	Brand New Eyes	2009	
"Caught in the Middle"	Williams; York	After Laughter	2017	
"C'est Comme Ça"	Williams; York; Zac Farro	This Is Why	2023	
"Conspiracy"	Williams; J. Farro; York	All We Know is Falling	2005	
"(One of Those) Crazy Girls"	Williams; York	Paramore	2013	
"Crave"	Williams; York	This Is Why	2023	
"crushcrushcrush" †	Williams; J. Farro	Riot!	2007	
"Daydreaming" †	Williams; York	Paramore	2013	
"Decode" †	Williams; J. Farro; York	Twilight (soundtrack)	2008	
"Decoy"	Williams; J. Farro	Riot!	2007	
"Emergency" †	Williams; J. Farro	All We Know is Falling	2005	
"Escape Route"	Williams; York	Paramore	2013	
"Fake Happy" †	Williams; York	After Laughter	2017	
"Fast in My Car"	Williams; York; Meldal-Johnsen	Paramore	2013	
"Feeling Sorry"	Williams; J. Farro; York	Brand New Eyes	2009	
"Fences"	Williams; Farro; David Bendeth	Riot!	2007	
"Figure 8"	Williams; York	This Is Why	2023	
"For a Pessimist, I'm Pretty Optimistic"	Williams; J. Farro	Riot!	2007	
"Forgiveness"	Williams; York	After Laughter	2017	
"Franklin"	Williams; J. Farro	All We Know is Falling	2005	
"Future"	Williams; York	Paramore	2013	
"Grow Up"	Williams; York	Paramore	2013	
"Grudges"	Williams; York; Z. Farro	After Laughter	2017	
"Hallelujah" †	Williams; J. Farro	Riot!	2007	
"Hard Times" †	Williams; York	After Laughter	2017	
"Hate to See Your Heart Break"	Williams; York	Paramore	2013	
"Hello Cold World" †	Williams; York	Singles Club	2011	
"Here We Go Again"	Williams; J. Farro	All We Know is Falling	2005	
"I Caught Myself"	Williams; J. Farro	Twilight (soundtrack)	2008	
"Idle Worship"	Williams; York	After Laughter	2017	
"Ignorance" †	Williams; J. Farro	Brand New Eyes	2009	
"Interlude: Holiday"	Williams; Jeremy Davis	Paramore	2013	
"Interlude: I'm Not Angry Anymore"	Williams; York	Paramore	2013	
"Interlude: Moving On"	Williams; York	Paramore	2013	
"In the Mourning" †	Williams; York	Singles Club	2011	
"Last Hope"	Williams; York	Paramore	2013	
"Let the Flames Begin"	Williams; J. Farro	Riot!	2007	
"Liar"	Williams; York	This Is Why	2023	
"Looking Up"	Williams; J. Farro	Brand New Eyes	2009	
"Miracle"	Williams; J. Farro	Riot!	2007	
"Misery Business" †	Williams; J. Farro	Riot!	2007	
"Misguided Ghosts"	Williams; J. Farro; York	Brand New Eyes	2009	
"Monster" †	Williams; York	Transformers: Dark of the Moon (soundtrack)	2011	
"My Heart"	Williams; J. Farro	All We Know Is Falling	2005	
"My Hero"	Dave Grohl; Nate Mendel; Pat Smear	Sound of Superman	2006	
"Native Tongue"	Williams; York	Paramore	2013	
"Never Let This Go"	Williams; J. Farro	All We Know is Falling	2005	
"The News"	Williams; York	This Is Why	2023	
"No Friend"	Williams; York; Aaron Weiss	After Laughter	2017	
"Now" †	Williams; York	Paramore	2013	
"Oh Star"	Williams; York	The Summer Tic EP	2005	
"The Only Exception" †	Williams; J. Farro	Brand New Eyes	2009	
"Part II"	Williams; York	Paramore	2013	
"Playing God" †	Williams; J. Farro; York	Brand New Eyes	2009	
"Pool"	Williams; York; Z. Farro	After Laughter	2017	
"Pressure" †	Williams; Farro	All We Know is Falling	2005	
"Proof"	Williams; York	Paramore	2013	
"Renegade" †	Williams; York; Davis	Singles Club	2011	
"Rewind"	Williams; J. Farro	Riot!	2007	
"Rose-Colored Boy" †	Williams; York; Zac Farro	After Laughter	2017	
"Running Out of Time"†	Williams; York; Zac Farro	This Is Why	2023	
"Still into You" †	Williams; York	Paramore	2013	
"Stop This Song (Lovesick Melody)"	Williams; J. Farro	Riot!	2007	
"Stuck on You"	Ken Andrews; Greg Edwards	The Summer Tic EP	2005	
"Tell Me How"	Williams; York	After Laughter	2017	
"Tell Me it's Okay"	Williams; York	Paramore [Deluxe]	2013	
"Temporary"	Williams; J. Farro	Riot!	2007	
"That's What You Get" †	Williams; J. Farro; York	Riot!	2007	
"Thick Skull"	Williams; York	This Is Why	2023	
"This Circle"	Williams; J. Farro	The Summer Tic EP	2005	
"This Is Why" †	Williams; York	This Is Why	2023	
"Told You So" †	Williams; York	After Laughter	2017	
"Turn it Off"	Williams; J. Farro	Brand New Eyes	2009	
"We Are Broken"	Williams; J. Farro; Bendeth	Riot!	2007	
"When it Rains"	Williams; J. Farro; Z. Farro	Riot!	2007	
"Where the Lines Overlap"	Williams; J. Farro	Brand New Eyes	2009	
"Whoa"	Williams; J. Farro	All We Know is Falling	2005	
"You First"	Williams; York	This Is Why	2023	
