= All I Wanted =

All I Wanted may refer to:

- All I Wanted (Kansas song), 1986
- All I Wanted (Paramore song), 2009
- All I Wanted (Avril Lavigne song), 2022
- All I Wanted (Tegan and Sara song), 2022
