= The Holiday Sessions =

EP by Paramore
- Released: April 20, 2013
- Genre: Acoustic
- Length: 3:31
- Label: Fueled by Ramen

Paramore chronology
Paramore (2013)	The Holiday Sessions (2013)	After Laughter (2017)

The Holiday Sessions is an EP by the American rock band Paramore. The 7" vinyl is limited edition, with only 700 copies made, 300 of which released during the Record Store Day 2013 in Nashville, Tennessee, on April 20.

The 7" vinyl has the shape of a pink hibiscus flower.

The EP consists of the three interludes from the band's fourth self-titled studio album, Paramore.

== Track listing ==
All tracks are written by Hayley Williams and Taylor York, except 2, written by Williams and Jeremy Davis.

No.	Title	Length
1.	"Interlude: Moving On"	1:30
2.	"Interlude: Holiday"	1:09
3.	"Interlude: I'm Not Angry Anymore"	0:52
Total length:		3:31

== Personnel ==
- Hayley Williams – lead vocals
- Jeremy Davis – bass guitar
- Taylor York – ukulele
