= Burning Down the House (disambiguation) =

"Burning Down the House" is a 1983 song by Talking Heads.

Burning Down the House or Burnin' Down the House may also refer to:

- House fire

== Music ==
- Burnin' Down the House: Live at the House of Blues, 2003 blues album by Etta James
- Burnin Down The House, 2005 rap album by Canibus
- "Burnin Down the House", 2006 song on the album Villebillies by Villebillies
- "Burning Down the House", 2024 song by Paramore

== Television ==
- "Burnin' Down the House", episode of the 1986–93 series The Judge
- "Burning Down the House", 1992 episode in season 3 of Northern Exposure
- "Burnin' Down the House" (The Fresh Prince of Bel-Air), 1995 season 6 episode
- "Burnin' Down the House", 1995 2-part episode in season 7 of Wings
- "Burning Down the House" (That '70s Show episode), 2000 season 2 episode
- "Burning Down the House", 2004 episode in season 9 of The Drew Carey Show
- "Burning Down the House", 2005 episode of Flip This House
- "Burning Down the House", 2008 episode in season 3 of The New Adventures of Old Christine
- "Burning Down the House", 2011 episode in season 2 of I'm in the Band
- "Burning Down the House", 2011 episode in season 4 of True Blood
- "Burning Down the House", 2011 episode in season 2 of Rizzoli & Isles

== Other uses ==
- Burning Down the House (film), a 2001 film directed by Philippe Mora
- Burning Down the House (memoir), a 2009 memoir by Russell Wangersky
- Burning Down the House (novel), a 2016 novel by Jane Mendelsohn
- "Burning Down the House", a 2022 book by Andrew Koppelman

== See also ==
- Burn the House Down (disambiguation)
- Bringing Down the House (disambiguation)
