= Burn the House Down =

Burn the House Down may refer to:

- Burn the House Down (manga), a Japanese manga series that has a live-action TV adaptation
- "Burn the House Down" (song), a song by AJR

== See also ==
- Burning Down the House (disambiguation)
