= Hate to See Your Heart Break =

Promotional single by Paramore featuring Joy Williams

from the album Paramore
- Released: November 24, 2014
- Recorded: 2012 in Los Angeles, CA
- Genre: Folk; soft rock
- Length: 5:12
- Label: Fueled by Ramen
- Songwriter(s): Hayley Williams; Taylor York
- Producer(s): Justin Meldal-Johnsen

"Hate to See Your Heart Break" is a song by American rock band Paramore, recorded for their 2013 self-titled fourth album Paramore. It was re-recorded to feature vocals by folk singer Joy Williams (formerly of The Civil Wars) for the 2014 deluxe edition of the album, the first time Paramore has collaborated with another artist or group on a studio recording.

== Background ==
Hayley Williams and Joy Williams have been real life friends for over a decade. H. Williams explained, "I love that I got to sing this with someone who I have shared my pains and my stories with for quite some time." According to H. Williams, the duet version of the song is also an ode to "close friendship between women who share their stories with each other, and who lift each other up and understand one another."

== Reception ==
Hilary Hughes at Fuse gives the song a positive reaction, stating, "While the first version of 'Hate to See Your Heart Break' offers up vocals ripe with emotion and the gentle touch of violins and soft instrumentation, the addition of [Joy] Williams' gorgeous folk flavor is a welcome, wonderful foil to Hayley's sky-high soprano."

== Music video ==
A music video for the song was released on November 24, 2014. The video was directed by Chuck David Willis. It is a black-and-white video that features H. Williams and J. Williams singing at The Village studio in Santa Monica, California.

== Charts ==
Chart (2015)	Peak position
US Hot Rock & Alternative Songs (Billboard)	23
