= All I Wanted (Paramore song) =

Song by Paramore

from the album Brand New Eyes
- Released: September 29, 2009
- Studio: Lightning Sound Studio (Hidden Hills, CA)
- Genre: Pop-punk
- Length: 3:49
- Label: Fueled By Ramen
- Songwriters: Hayley Williams; Josh Farro; Taylor York
- Producers: Rob Cavallo; Paramore

Official audio
- Paramore – All I Wanted (Official Audio) on YouTube

"All I Wanted" is a song from American rock band Paramore, originally released in 2009 as the final track on the band's third album, Brand New Eyes.

== Background ==
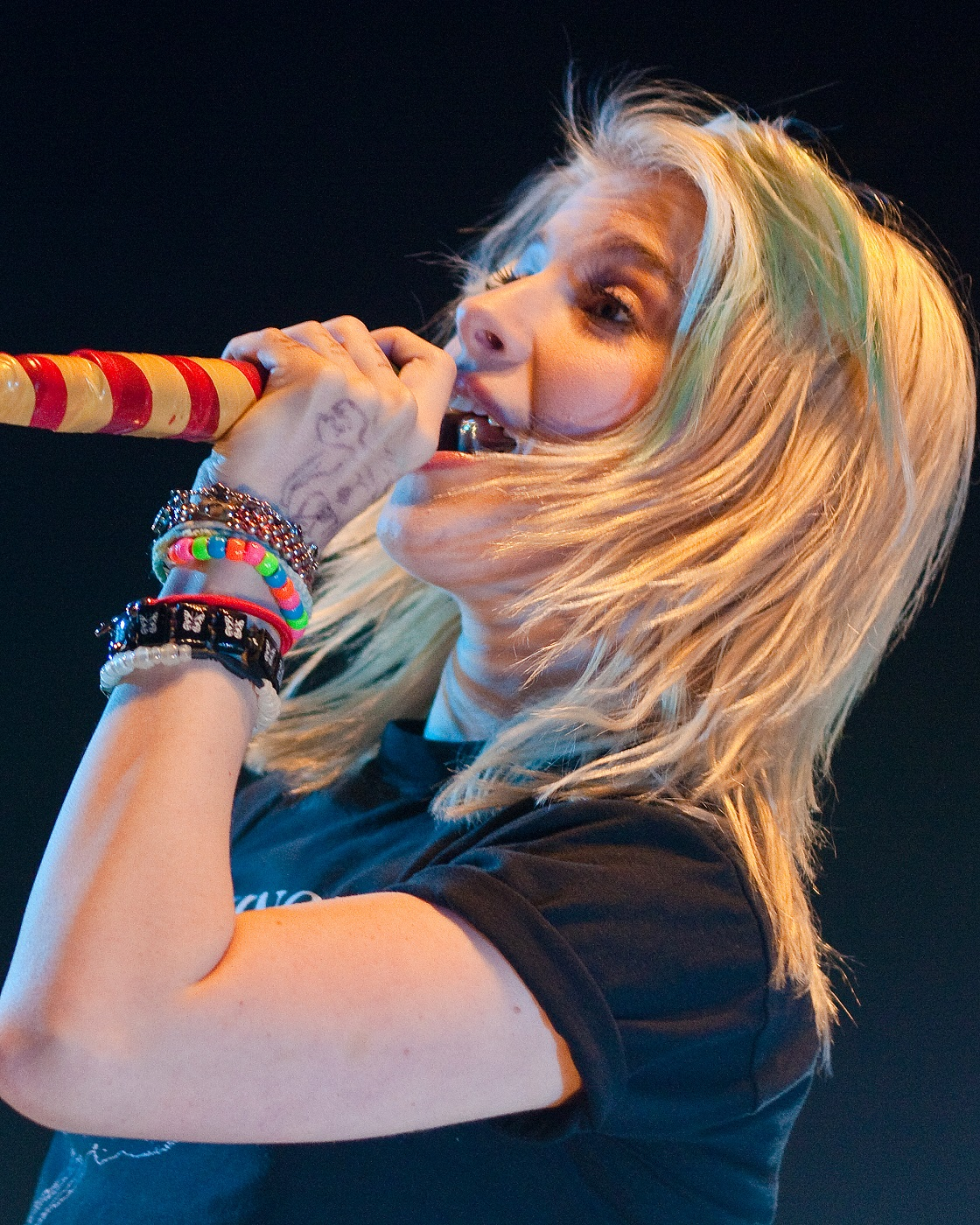
Williams in 2009

According to Paramore's frontwoman Hayley Williams, the song was not inspired by any actual events. In an interview with Alternative Press, Williams said the following about the writing of the song:

"I wish there was an actual story for this song. The whole time we were writing and rehearsing at home, I was in this state where I wouldn't come out or go out unless it was to write with the guys. I spent so much time alone in my apartment that I think it started to mess with me and just make me really sad. One day, I went to practice and [‌Taylor York] was playing this song. It was another one of his. It hit me and I just started writing whatever came to mind. 'All I Wanted' almost didn't make the record. I can't remember why we didn't think it would work. We would've been pissed right now if it wasn't there."

Additionally, in a handwritten journal included with specific releases of Brand New Eyes, Williams also detailed that she wrote the song out of boredom while Chad Gilbert of New Found Glory, whom she was dating at the time, was on tour, going on to say that she was proud that the lyrics were obscure while still remaining personal to her. It was also revealed in the included lyric sheet that the song was originally entitled "All I Wanted Was You".

== Composition ==
"All I Wanted" is a pop-punk power ballad. In contrast to other songs by the band, "All I Wanted" serves as a showcase of Williams' vocals, with her singing several high notes. Meanwhile, the song's instrumentation is more sparse, with it starting with an acoustic guitar before evolving throughout its runtime; Uproxx described the song as an "acoustic ditty that morphs into a raging wail-fest".

== Critical reception ==
At the time of Brand New Eyes's release, "All I Wanted" was cited as a standout track, with several publications writing positively about it in their reviews. Scott Heisel of Alternative Press described the song as "immensely powerful", while Faye Lewis of Rock Sound described it as part of "the album's big surprise", stating that it "[sees] the fragility of Hayley's vocals laid against sparse instrumentation with truly immaculate results." Tom Spinelli of Melodic also praised Williams' performance in the song, writing that the song showcases "the more serious side of the band and [is where Hayley] really showcases her vocal ability[...] Especially on the ending, the strain she puts forth on the note before the band comes crashing in is so powerful, chills may run down your spine."

In the years since, the song has been regarded as one of the band's best. It was included in Clash Magazine's 2023 list of the 18 best Paramore songs, being praised as "a musical spectacle that deserves to be played loudly, and has the innate ability to take your breath away." Similarly, Uproxx also included the song in their 2023 list of the top 40 best Paramore songs, with it being named number six. The publication wrote that the song is "one of those moments of histrionic heightened emotion that feels completely natural and justified", going on to say that the song is "probably the greatest example of how Paramore is unafraid to dive into the inherent ugliness of truly feeling and internalizing every facet of emotion that racks the mind and heart."

== Live performances ==
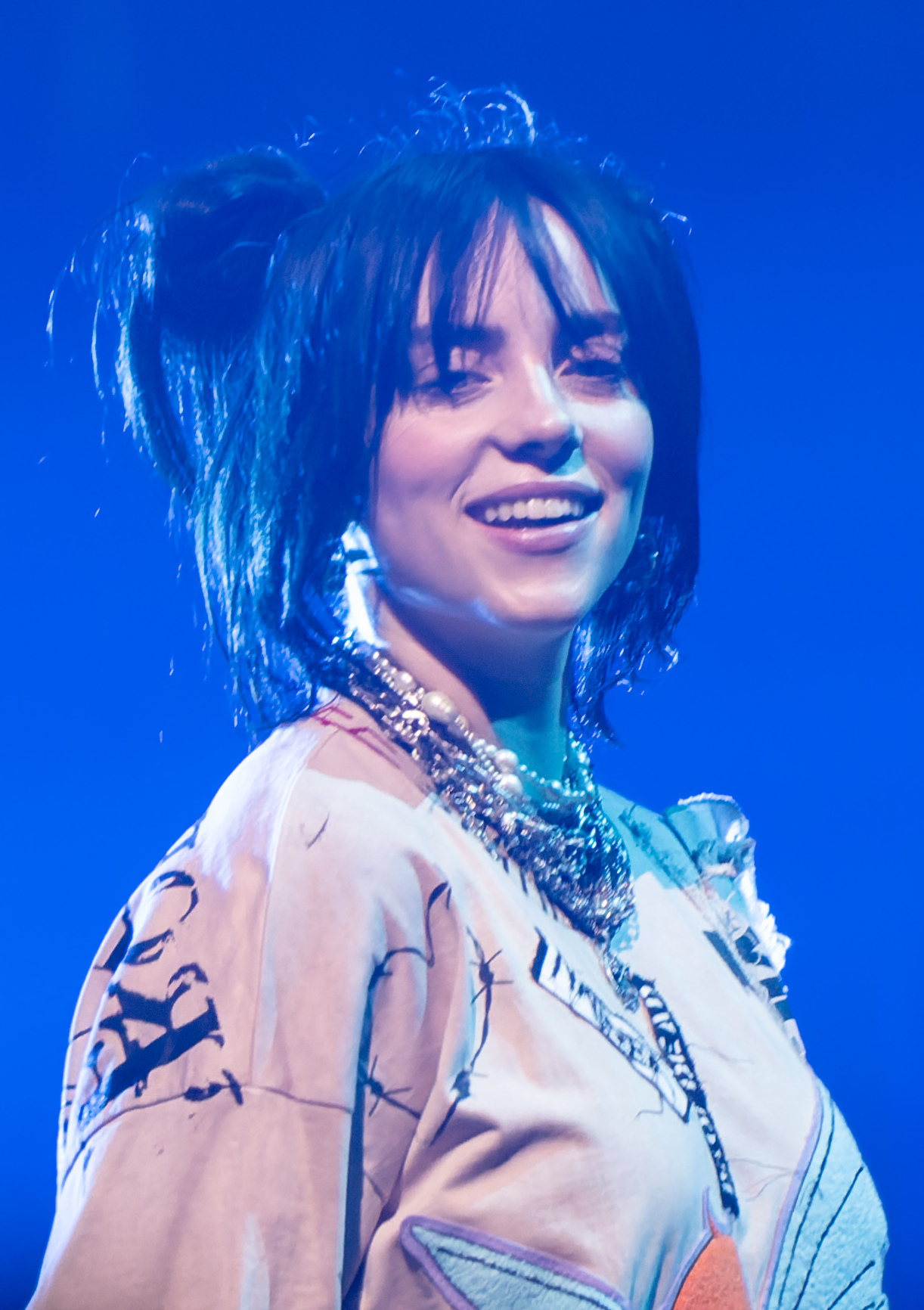
Eilish in 2022

Since the song's release up until 2022, the song remained one of the band's only few that they had never performed live. Speculation suggests that this was due to the vocal strain that the song would exert on Williams, specifically in regards to the high note present in the final chorus. On October 23, 2022, the band debuted the song live at the When We Were Young festival.

The band has since performed the song sparingly. After citing it on social media as her favorite Paramore song, on July 29, 2023, singer Billie Eilish was invited on stage to perform the song with the band during the encore of a show that was part of the This Is Why Tour. This was after Williams joined Eilish at the latter's set at Coachella 2022 to perform "Misery Business" and "Happier Than Ever".

== Personnel ==
Musicians

- Hayley Williams – lead vocals
- Josh Farro – guitar
- Taylor York – guitar
- Jeremy Davis – bass guitar
- Zac Farro – drums

Production

- Rob Cavallo – producer
- Paramore – co-producer
- Doug McKean – engineer
- Lars Fox – engineer
- Dan Chase – recording engineer
- Chris Lord-Alge – mixing engineer
- Ted Jensen – mastering engineer
- Brad Townsend – additional engineer
- Russ Waugh – assistant engineer
- Steve Rea – assistant engineer
- Keith Armstrong – assistant mixing engineer
- Nik Karpen – assistant mixing engineer

== Charts ==
Chart performance for "All I Wanted"
| Chart (2009) | Peak position |
|---|---|
| UK Rock & Metal (Official Charts) | 18 |

== Certifications ==
Certifications for "All I Wanted"
| Region | Certification | Certified units/sales |
|---|---|---|
| New Zealand (RMNZ) | Platinum | 30,000^{‡} |
| United Kingdom (BPI) | Gold | 400,000^{‡} |
^{‡} Sales+streaming figures based on certification alone.
