= Ain't It Fun (Paramore song) =

Single by Paramore

from the album Paramore
- Released: February 4, 2014
- Recorded: 2012
- Genre: Pop rock; funk rock; alternative rock; new wave; new jack swing; soul
- Length: 4:56 (album version); 3:52 (radio edit)
- Label: Fueled by Ramen; Atlantic
- Songwriters: Hayley Williams; Taylor York
- Producers: Justin Meldal-Johnsen; Taylor York

Paramore singles chronology
"Daydreaming" (2013)	"Ain't It Fun" (2014)	"Hard Times" (2017)

Music video
- "Ain't It Fun" on YouTube

"Ain't It Fun" is a song by American rock band Paramore, released as the fourth and final single from their self-titled fourth studio album (2013). Produced by musician Justin Meldal-Johnsen, the song was recorded in Los Angeles. Development for it began with a keyboard loop recorded by its guitarist, Taylor York. Instruments including marimba and bass guitar were later brought, along with a six-member gospel choir. York and the band's vocalist, Hayley Williams, wrote the song based on her experience of relocating and the latter's subsequent attitude.

The song received critical acclaim from music critics, who hailed its musical diversity. It was serviced to mainstream radio in the United States and Italy; a 12-inch vinyl record of the single was released for Record Store Day 2014. The song became Paramore's highest-peaking single on the US Billboard Hot 100, peaking at number 10 and received 'triple platinum' certification from the RIAA having sold over three million singles. It also remains their only top 10 hit on that chart. Internationally, the song garnered moderate commercial outcomes, reaching the top 40 of Australian, Canadian, and Venezuelan charts. On February 8, 2015, the song won the Grammy Award for Best Rock Song at the 57th ceremony, becoming Paramore's first Grammy win, and making Williams the first woman to score that honor since Alanis Morissette in 1999.

"Ain't It Fun" was performed on television several times, including on The Voice, Late Night with Seth Meyers, and American Idol. It was also included in the band's The Self-Titled Tour (2013–15). After the original music video directed by Jonathan Desbiens was canceled, a second video was directed by Sophia Peer. The latter, released in January 2014, documents the band attempting to break a series of world records.

== Recording and development ==
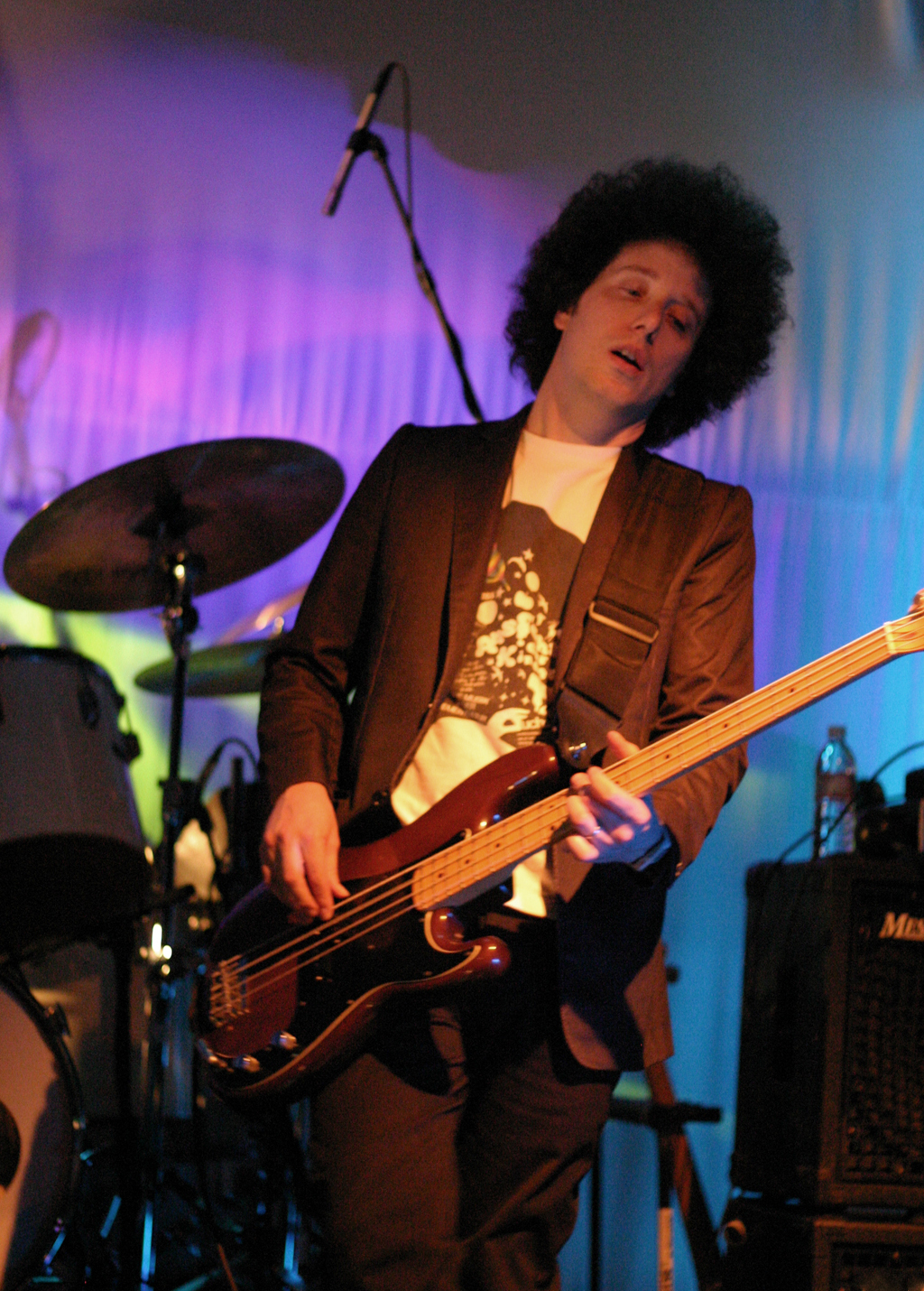
The song's producer, Justin Meldal-Johnsen

The first song completed in Los Angeles for Paramore, "Ain't It Fun" was produced by musician Justin Meldal-Johnsen and the band's guitarist Taylor York. Development for the song started in a hotel room, where York created an audio loop with his keyboard, which Williams likened to works by Siouxsie and the Banshees and Paula Abdul. Upon hearing it, Hayley Williams proposed that they should write lyrics to it. Later, Williams and York started layering their voices to imitate those of gospel choir members. Six months later, they recorded with a gospel choir composed of six individuals: Brandon Hampton, Joslyn James, Katherine and Sean Dancy, Talitha Manor and Yolanda Harris-Dancy. Williams, who was familiar with gospel music, linked the inclusion of a gospel choir in the song to her upbringing, in which she frequently went to churches. Williams stated that the song was inspired by the band's "roots", explaining that she had grown up with "pop, funk and soul".

Jeremy Davis—the band's bassist—expounded on what they felt before releasing the song, "After we started writing weird stuff like 'Ain't It Fun', we got nervous. But that was a comfort. We've grown and we don't like the same music we liked, so why would [our fans] not? That idea kept us pushing ourselves." York considered that the decision to bring a gospel choir would have been difficult to approve if the original lineup of the band had remained. The track was mixed by Ken Andrews, and mastered by Ted Jensen at Sterling Sound Studios.

== Composition and lyrical interpretation ==
Written in the key of E major, "Ain't It Fun" paces at a moderate tempo of 104 beats per minute. The song features instrumentation from a "happy" xylophone and a "rubbery" bass guitar. An editor of the Corvallis Gazette-Times described its melody as "cheery" and "propulsive", while Sean Adams from Drowned in Sound called it "infectious". Although its main genre is pop rock, Adams and Rebecca Nicholson of The Guardian denoted the song as delving into pop, more than the band's previous material. The former also compared it to the works of Incubus, while Nicholson stated that it "sounds as if Alexander O'Neal has just discovered Refused's back catalogue". Theon Weber of Spin labeled it as "bouncy" while denoting it as a new wave song. Writing for The A.V. Club, Annie Zaleski described the song as a mixture of rhythm and blues and pop; Jon Dolan of Rolling Stone characterized it as "soul-powered". Cameron Adams from News.com.au described it as a funk rock song, while Scott Heisel from Alternative Press classified it as a "blast of new jack swing". Barbara Schultz at Common Sense Media categorized it as a "funky alt-rock arrangement".

"Ain't It Fun"
A portion of "Ain't It Fun"'s bridge, in which a gospel choir sings.

The gospel choir first appears in the song during its bridge. Referencing the choir's feature, David Renshaw of NME commented that the song "pull[s] a Sister Act 2." The vocal ranges of Williams and the gospel choir spans from B_{3} to C♯_{5}. The former's vocal performance was described by Stereogum's Chris DeVille as having influences of Michael Jackson, whereas Zaleski compared Williams' vocal style in "Ain't It Fun" to that of Mariah Carey. Heisel considered that the participation of the choir helped Williams sing "some of her most soulful vocals ever". Joseph R. Atilano of the Philippine Daily Inquirer further analyzed Williams' vocal performance in the song:

[...] lead vocalist Hayley Williams is starting to show more of her musical chops–from her crooning to the soulful "touches" in her singing style, particularly in this single. These nuances in her voice signify to me that, vocally, she has entered her prime already. You can hear these changes specifically in the chorus and refrain sections of this single wherein she sings with greater confidence. Here, the versatility of her voice takes shape and we begin to take serious notice of what she can do more behind the mic.

The track's lyrics, structured in verse–chorus form and written in second person narrative, predominantly feature a sarcastic tone. They were inspired by Williams' decision to move from Nashville to Los Angeles. She considered this idea after feeling overwhelmed by the repercussion, in Nashville, of Josh and Zac Farro's departure from Paramore. Williams said, "I took off for L.A. as if it was going to be some kind of paradise or saving grace. I got there and realized that my problems were following me. Okay, so I was having a bad six months? Get over it. [sic]" The song was penned as a message regarding her behavior, in order for her to cope with her decision. She stated, "No one else was saying that to me, so I had to say it to myself." musicOMH's Thomas Ingham interpreted its lyrics as focusing on a "serious 'all alone in the world'" theme, while Corvallis Gazette-Times's journalist called them "blunt" and wrote that they discuss "growing up". The writer also believed that its theme would make the song a prominent track at graduation ceremonies. Atilano viewed a contrast between the song's melody and lyrical content. However, he noted that its "sunny" sonority made it "pleasant" to hear.

== Release and live performances ==
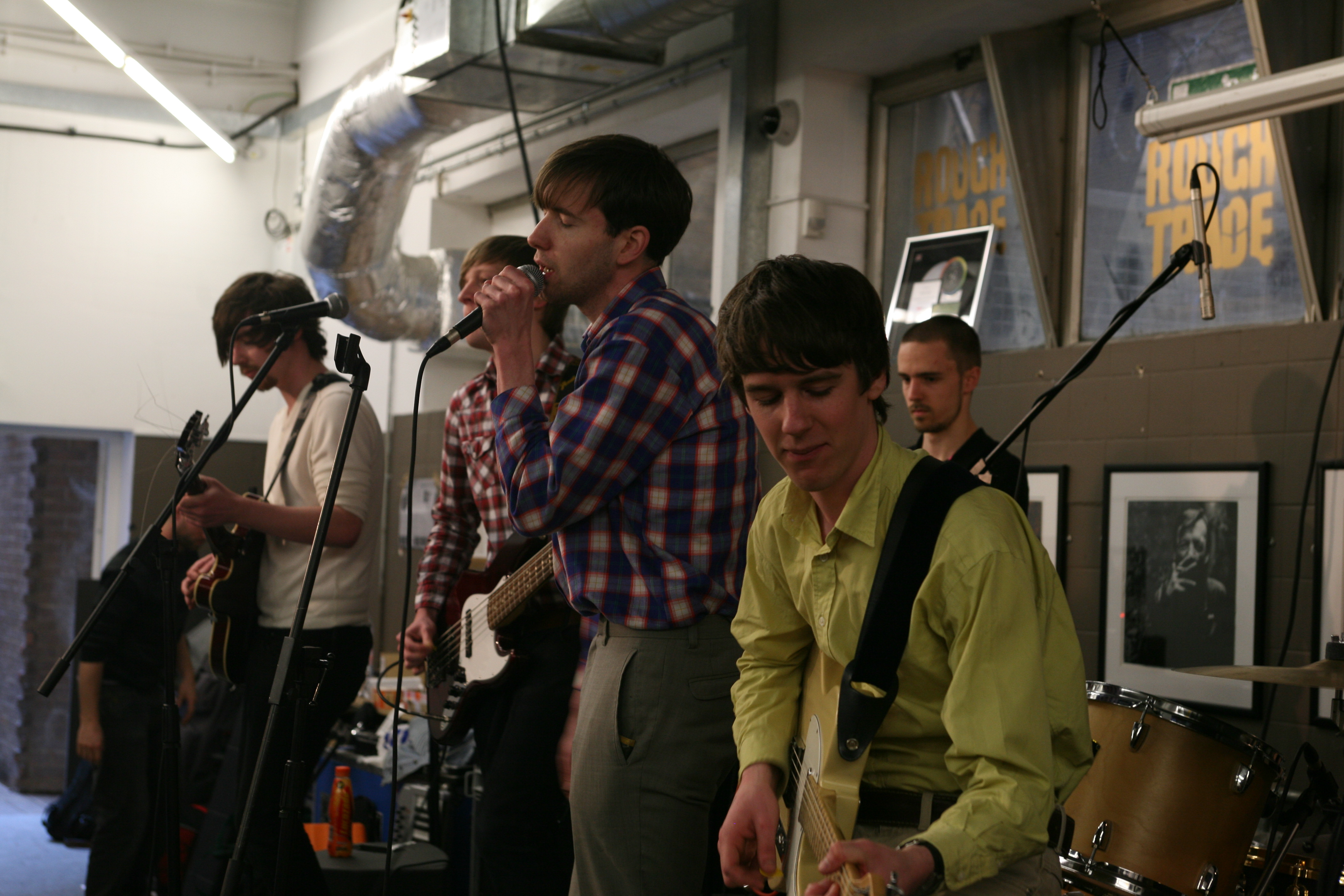
Indie band Dutch Uncles remixed "Ain't It Fun" for the song's vinyl release.

"Ain't It Fun" was issued as a promotional CD single in the United Kingdom on August 26, 2013. The track was serviced to American mainstream stations on February 4, 2014, serving as Paramore's fourth single. In the following month, it was announced that Paramore would participate in the 2014 Record Store Day with the release of a 12-inch single for "Ain't It Fun". The single, designed by Williams to look like a broken vinyl, was released on April 19. It contains the original version of the song, along with a Dutch Uncles-produced remix. In Italy, the song was serviced to contemporary hit radio on March 30, 2014 by Atlantic. On June 24, 2014, Atlantic released an extended play (EP) featuring the song's radio edit as well as three remixes.

The song was included in the setlist of the band's third worldwide tour, The Self-Titled Tour. For each performance of the song, the band was accompanied by a gospel choir, who sang alongside Williams. Jason Lipshutz of Billboard commented, "Williams kept conjuring the refrain [of "Ain't It Fun"], appearing as if she never wanted the moment to end. Could you really blame her?" The New Zealand Herald's Rachel Bache stated that the track "had everyone dancing".

The inaugural televised performance of the song was done on the 2013 iHeartRadio Jingle Ball, wherein it was selected as second song on the band's setlist.^{[a]} The band played the track on the season finale of The Voice's fifth season, which aired on December 17 of that year. On April 23, 2014, they sang it on the Late Night with Seth Meyers program. On May 21, 2014, the band performed the song on the American Idol season 13 finale. Finalist Jena Irene, who preceded Paramore with a live cover of the band's single "Decode", sang the second verse of "Ain't It Fun" alone. She also sang the chorus and bridge of the song with Paramore. The band hosted a concert on Good Morning America, on June 13, 2014, in which they performed "Ain't It Fun" as well.

== Critical reception ==
"Ain't It Fun" garnered critical acclaim from music critics. Writing for Alternative Press, Scott Heisel felt the song was one of the "moments of diversity that really make Paramore shine". Billboard's Brad Wete remarked that the song's instrumentation helped it pass an "average rock song" status. Matt Collar of AllMusic billed the song as an "immediate classic". For Stereogum, Chris DeVille opined that the song was "crack". Jon Dolan from Rolling Stone commented that, on "Ain't It Fun", Williams transitions to a new musical genre on Paramore with an "I-will-survive warrior priestess" attitude. Kyle Anderson of Entertainment Weekly, Brian Mansfield from the USA Today newspaper and Consequence of Sound's Amanda Koellner selected "Ain't It Fun" as a standout from the album. Koellner commented that "when the band allows each track a little more breathing room, they show some growth and have a good time doing it." On behalf of The Arts Desk, Lisa-Marie Ferla classified it as Paramore's "strongest moment".

Melissa Locker of Time described it as having potential for the "perfect summer anthem". Writing for Drowned in Sound, Sean Adams joked that he would eat his modem if the song did not top "all the major charts worldwide", receive a Grammy Award, and amass a high number of views on YouTube. In contrast, Thomas Ingham of musicOMH criticized its lyrics, deeming it inferior to the track's composition; The Observer's Phil Mongredien wrote that the song's gospel influences did it "no favours". Sputnikmusic's Channing Freeman quipped that previous band members Josh and Zac Farro had left the band upon hearing a demo of "Ain't It Fun". Freeman also described the song's lyrics as "ridiculous" and denounced the inclusion of the gospel choir. The Irish Times' Tony Clayton-Lea dubbed the song "woefully generic".

In 2017, NME ranked the song number two on their list of the 10 greatest Paramore songs, and in 2021, Kerrang ranked the song number four on their list of the 20 greatest Paramore songs. Pitchfork ranked the song at number 112 on their list of the best songs of the 2010s.

== Chart performance ==
"Ain't It Fun" debuted at number 96 on the US Billboard Hot 100 chart issue dated March 15, 2014. On its fifth week of charting, the song entered the top 40 of the Hot 100, at number 34. In doing so, Paramore became the band's first album to yield two top 40 hits, after "Still Into You" peaked at number 24. The song reached its peak of number 10 on the issue of May 24, 2014, becoming Paramore's highest-peaking and only top 10 song on the chart. According to Billboard, it is Williams's sixth-biggest US commercial success. On the magazine's component charts, "Ain't It Fun" reached higher positions—except for its peak of number 23 on the Adult Contemporary chart. For the week ending May 15, the song topped the Hot Rock Songs chart, displacing "Pompeii" by Bastille—which had remained at the top for 12 weeks. The track also topped the Adult Top 40, while peaking at number two on the Mainstream Top 40, behind "Fancy" by Iggy Azalea and Charli XCX. The song had sold over a million copies in the US as of June 2014.

Internationally, the song attained moderate success. The song entered the ARIA Singles Chart at number 41, on the week of September 8, 2013. Two weeks later, the track reached its peak of number 32, having left the chart three weeks later. "Ain't It Fun" spent nine weeks on the Canadian chart, where it reached a peak of number 15. Not having been released as a single in the United Kingdom, the song became Paramore's second lowest-peaking track there—reaching number 147. As of May 2020, "Ain't It Fun" has sold 291,000 units in the country, becoming the eight best-selling single of the band there. The song reached the top five on the country's Rock Chart. In Ireland, the song peaked at number 61.

== Music video ==
=== Development and release ===
"That is an unfortunate thing that happens, for both the director and the artist. [...] if the band had a bad experience in the past, it didn't transfer over to this video. Hayley, Jeremy, and Taylor are totally professional and easy to work with [...] They're really great on camera."

— Sophia Peer on the canceled video for "Ain't It Fun" and working with Paramore

Pre-production for the first version of the "Ain't It Fun" music video started in early July 2013. Alternative Press reported that Jonathan Desbiens, also known as Jodeb, was commissioned to direct the video. The video shoot continued into August, when Williams posted a picture of the band in the set. Two months later, however, the band posted a statement where they revealed that the video had been canceled. Williams cited "unhappiness with the direction the video was headed" as an explanatory factor; in replacement, a video for "Daydreaming" was filmed.

A new visual for the song, directed by Sophia Peer, was shot on December 2 of that year in Franklin, Tennessee. Peer stated that she wanted the video to "reflect" the message she retained from the song—"you had to push yourself out of your comfort zone and challenge yourself". She began by brainstorming ideas for the visual, and she talked to Alexandra Young and the video's editor Winston Case, who suggested her the concept of breaking world records. Peer selected 30 records for the band to break, nonetheless, they reduced the number due to the short length of the video shoot. The records selected were picked to match "different sections of the song" and were based on other already-existent records.

To promote the video, Paramore associated with RecordSetter, convincing fans to create their own world records. No partnerships were established with Guinness World Records; Peer commented, "RecordSetter is much more inclusive than Guinness, therefore cooler. [The former's CEO], Dan Rollman, is an inspired individual who has dedicated himself to helping people legitimize their talents and specialties. It is definitely the right place for Paramore fans to play along." The video was released on January 29, 2014; a behind-the-scenes clip was released on March 3.

=== Synopsis ===
The video starts with Paramore holding electric guitars, heading towards the side of a bridge. They begin smashing clocks with guitars on a roadside, and a title screen appears, announcing that the band broke the record of smashing 30 clocks with guitars—^{[b]} at a time of 31.33 seconds. The camera shifts to a room where the group attempts to catch flying feathers; Davis breaks the record of catching the most (18) feathers in 30 s. The next scene shows the group wearing eye goggles, in a room with white walls, destroying vinyl records in several ways—such as ripping them, stepping on them or punching them. The band breaks another record, after smashing 58 vinyl records in a minute, the highest number of broken records for that time. While the band is destroying more records, York makes a record as an individual by spinning a record on his finger for 32.81 s—the most time ever for that accomplishment.

As the second rendition of the chorus begins, they go to an open field where they run through 10 banners in the quickest time ever of 9.19 s. Quickly after breaking their sixth world record, Williams breaks her first individual record, of doing the "most cartwheels while wearing boots for 20 seconds" by doing 7. The band members reunite and start walking backwards for 30 feet, while blindfolded and holding stuffed animals. This achievement is done by York in the fastest time ever of 6.14 seconds. For the penultimate record, Davis and York break the record of unwrapping a "mummy" in the least time; they unwrap Williams, who is covered in toilet paper, in 9.75 s. During the closing scene, Williams, York, and Davis stand on a moving convertible, with Williams breaking the last record of screaming for the maximum time while in a convertible—for 8.48 s. The video concludes as it is revealed that "Ain't It Fun" itself holds the world record of depicting the most world records broken in a music video, with 10.

=== Response ===
MTV's James Montgomery compared the video to the visual of "Still Into You"—the second single of Paramore. He wrote, "That clip was a revelation, the beginning of a bold new chapter for the band, and [the video for "Ain't It Fun"] keeps that winning streak alive." Montgomery went on to call it "blissed out and buzzy, born of a brilliant concept, and an absolute blast to watch". Fuse's Nicole James surmised that the world records were "adorable", while Steff Yotka of Nylon deemed them "crazy, funny, weird" and concluded that they "make for a truly excellent viewing experience". On the critical side, Mish Way—writing for Vice—opined that the video's concept did not relate to the song's theme. Way dubbed the clip a "major fuck-up" but called Williams an "irresistible charm".

== Track listing ==
Remixes EP
No.	Title	Length
1.	"Ain't It Fun" (Radio edit)	3:51
2.	"Ain't It Fun" (Dutch Uncles remix)	4:57
3.	"Ain't It Fun" (Kye Kye remix)	4:35
4.	"Ain't It Fun" (Smash Mode remix)	5:25

12-inch single
No.	Title	Length
1.	"Ain't It Fun" (Side A)	4:56
2.	"Ain't It Fun" (Dutch Uncles remix) (Side B)	4:57

== Charts ==
=== Weekly charts ===
Weekly chart performance for "Ain't It Fun"
Chart (2014)	Peak position
Australia (ARIA)	32
Canada Hot 100 (Billboard)	27
Canada AC (Billboard)	21
Canada CHR/Top 40 (Billboard)	14
Canada Hot AC (Billboard)	8
Czech Republic Airplay (ČNS IFPI)	25
Czech Republic Singles Digital (ČNS IFPI)	51
Finland Radio (Suomen virallinen lista)	10
Hungary (Rádiós Top 40)	4
Ireland (IRMA)	55
Mexico Ingles Airplay (Billboard)	8
Slovakia Singles Digital (ČNS IFPI)	61
UK Singles (OCC)	147
UK Rock & Metal (Official Charts)	3
US Billboard Hot 100	10
US Adult Contemporary (Billboard)	11
US Adult Pop Airplay (Billboard)	1
US Hot Rock & Alternative Songs (Billboard)	1
US Pop Airplay (Billboard)	2
Venezuela Pop/Rock Songs (Record Report)	11

=== Year-end charts ===
Year-end chart performance for "Ain't It Fun"
Chart (2014)	Position
Canada (Canadian Hot 100)	95
Hungary (Rádiós Top 40)	46
US Billboard Hot 100	47
US Adult Contemporary (Billboard)	24
US Adult Top 40 (Billboard)	11
US Hot Rock & Alternative Songs (Billboard)	7
US Mainstream Top 40 (Billboard)	23

=== Decade-end charts ===
Decade-end chart performance for "Ain't It Fun"
Chart (2010–19)	Position
US Hot Rock Songs (Billboard)	36

== Certifications ==
Certifications and sales for "Ain't It Fun"
Region	Certification	Certified units/sales
Australia (ARIA)	2× Platinum	140,000^{‡}
Canada (Music Canada)	2× Platinum	160,000^{‡}
New Zealand (RMNZ)	3× Platinum	90,000^{‡}
United Kingdom (BPI)	Platinum	600,000^{‡}
United States (RIAA)	3× Platinum	3,000,000^{‡}
^{‡} Sales+streaming figures based on certification alone.

== Release history ==
Release dates and formats for "Ain't It Fun"
Region	Date	Format	Label(s)	Ref.
United States	February 4, 2014	Mainstream airplay	Fueled By Ramen	

== See also ==
- List of Billboard Hot 100 top 10 singles in 2014
- List of number-one Billboard Rock Songs

== Footnotes ==
=== Additional information ===
a The iHeart Radio Jingle Ball 2013 occurred on December 14, 2013. However, it was not broadcast live—it was recorded and "highlights" of the performances were aired on a special program aired by The CW (on December 18).

b Once Paramore—being one of its members or the entire group—breaks a world record in the "Ain't It Fun" video, a title screen appears stating the record they have established, as well as displaying the time it took.
