= Bringing Down the House =

Bringing Down the House may refer to:

- Bringing Down the House (book), a 2003 book by Ben Mezrich
- Bringing Down the House (film), a 2003 American comedy
  - Bringing Down the House (soundtrack), a soundtrack album from the film
- "Bringing Down the House" (The Apprentice), an episode of the U.S. version of The Apprentice
- "Bringing Down the House", an episode of Supa Strikas
- Bringing Down the House, a 2009 NZWPW New Zealand Tag Team Championship event

== See also ==
- Bringing Down the Horse, a 1996 album by The Wallflowers
- Burning Down the House (disambiguation)
