= Now (Paramore song) =

Single by Paramore

from the album Paramore
- Released: January 22, 2013
- Recorded: 2012 in Los Angeles, California
- Genre: Pop-punk; alternative rock
- Length: 4:07
- Label: Fueled by Ramen
- Songwriters: Hayley Williams; Taylor York
- Producers: Justin Meldal-Johnsen; Taylor York

Paramore singles chronology
"Monster" (2011)	"Now" (2013)	"Still Into You" (2013)

Audio sample
- 17 second sample from Paramore's "Now": file; help

Music video
- "Now" on YouTube

"Now" is a song by American rock band Paramore. It was released on January 22, 2013, as the lead single from their self-titled fourth album. The song impacted radio on January 29, 2013. It is their first single in an album to not feature former band members Josh and Zac Farro since their departure in 2010. "Now" received acclaim from music critics, with reviewers praising its production, lyrical content, and Hayley Williams' vocal delivery on the track. The single achieved moderate commercial success, ranking within the top 20 of Billboard's Hot Rock Songs and Alternative Songs. It is a playable song in the video game Rocksmith 2014. "Now" is written in the key of C major.

== Background ==
"Now" was written as a song that helped Paramore transition from the past to the present. According to Hayley Williams, "The first half of this record ... was all about getting to a new place, moving forward. And when we wrote 'Now,' by the end of the song I was like 'We're there. We got to that point and now we can really focus on what's next.'"

== Reception ==
"Now" received critical acclaim from critics. David Marchese of Spin rated the song an 8/10 and praised it for being catchy, commenting ""Now" is a pretty nifty bait-and-switch" and said that Paramore has been listening to "weirder" bands. James Brindle of Burton Mail rated the song a 4/5, saying it has a "fantastically catchy chorus and showcases Hayley Williams’ immaculate vocals to great effect" and compared it with Blink-182's newer material. Matthew Leimkuehler of Columbia Missourian rated the song a 5/5, stating "This particular track has more of an edge to it, while still containing one of the best hooks delivered from a rock band in the last few years" and comments that the band can still deliver without the Farro brothers. Popdust rated the song a 4/5, commenting "When Williams sings about not giving up over scrambling drums and frantic guitars on the track’s bridge, it’s hard to not go all in with her."

== Music video ==
The music video was directed by Daniel "Cloud" Campos and was inspired by a piece of artwork by Banksy. Williams explains "The song feels like it has a bit of violence to it, but its not about that at all. It's about embracing something more than that and looking forward to something that maybe you can’t see yet, believing before you see ... When people watch the video, I think it comes across, hopefully, clearly that love always wins in the end." The music video premiered on February 11, 2013, on MTV, and was uploaded to the Fueled by Ramen YouTube channel the next day.

The video begins in the middle of a foggy field with Hayley Williams and a soldier. Their eyes are locked on each other, and then the soldier throws a hand grenade. The song starts as Williams closes her eyes just before the grenade explodes. When she's down, a sequence of action ensues with men who appear to be with Williams (including Jeremy Davis and Taylor York) fighting men on the soldier's side.

== Charts ==
=== Weekly charts ===
Weekly chart performance for "Now"
Chart (2013)	Peak position
Australia (ARIA)	86
Austria (Ö3 Austria Top 40)	70
Belgium (Ultratip Bubbling Under Flanders)	70
Japan (Japan Hot 100) (Billboard)	90
UK Singles (OCC)	39
UK Rock & Metal (OCC)	2
US Bubbling Under Hot 100 (Billboard)	3
US Hot Rock & Alternative Songs (Billboard)	16
US Rock & Alternative Airplay (Billboard)	26

=== Year-end charts ===
Year-end chart performance for "Now"
Chart (2013)	Position
US Hot Rock Songs (Billboard)	91
