= Grow Up (Paramore song) =

Song by Paramore

from the album Paramore
- Released: April 5, 2013
- Recorded: 2012
- Genre: Power pop; new wave; synth-pop
- Length: 3:50
- Label: Fueled by Ramen
- Songwriter(s): Hayley Williams; Taylor York
- Producer(s): Justin Meldal-Johnsen; Taylor York

"Grow Up" is a song by American rock band Paramore, and is the third track from their self-titled fourth studio album Paramore. Despite not being released as a single, the song charted at #36 on the UK Rock chart. It garnered acclaim from music critics, who called the song one of the standout tracks on Paramore, and praised its production and lyricism.

The song's title also appears on the parent album's revised artwork, which was introduced in November 2022.

== Composition ==
"Grow Up" was written by the band's lead singer Hayley Williams, and lead guitarist Taylor York. Production was handled by York and Justin Meldal-Johnsen. "Grow Up" includes a mid-tempo guitar, synthesizers and has a Caribbean backbeat, similar to that of No Doubt. The song also contains a funk-influenced guitar riff. Lyrically, "Grow Up" is about growing up as a person and leaving the past behind.

== Critical reception ==
The song received positive reviews from music critics. Popdust gave the song a 4.5/5, commenting "The flourish of strings ... that accompanies her begging someone to admit they don't care is the power pop equivalent of a finger in the face, a thrilling moment on a record full of high points." MTV Buzzworthy says "Here, the band swerves into new territory: synthesizers float, electronic fuzz blasts and flutters, and a mid-tempo guitar riff sounds almost ready for the dance floor. It's the kind of shift No Doubt nailed before them, and Paramore lives up to their former tour partners' example." The Stylus regards the song as "super fun and playful", adding "It’s hard not to move your shoulders to the beat and sing along". Digital Spy says "Williams's ruthlessness is highlighted best on "Grow Up" as she tells her squeeze - or more likely the Farro brothers - that she had to move on" Ed Masley at The Arizona Republic ranked it as the 15th best Paramore song, stating ""Grow Up" is one of several highlights of their new self-titled album that "wears its love of New Wave culture like an extreme asymmetrical bob."

== Chart performance ==
Chart (2013)	Peak position
UK Rock (The Official Charts Company)	36
