= Daydreaming (Paramore song) =

Single by Paramore

from the album Paramore
- Released: December 2, 2013
- Recorded: 2012 in Los Angeles, California
- Genre: Alternative rock; pop rock; power pop; dream pop
- Length: 4:31
- Label: Fueled by Ramen
- Songwriters: Hayley Williams; Taylor York
- Producer: Justin Meldal-Johnsen

Paramore singles chronology
"Still Into You" (2013)	"Daydreaming" (2013)	"Ain't It Fun" (2014)

Music video
- "Daydreaming" on YouTube

"Daydreaming" is a song by American rock band Paramore, from their self-titled fourth studio album (2013). The song was released as the album's third single on December 2, 2013 in the UK.

== Composition ==
Hayley Williams has called the song "a total rip of 'Dreaming' by Blondie." Stylistically, "Daydreaming" has been described as alternative rock, pop rock, power pop and dream pop.

== Reception ==
The song received mostly positive reviews from critics. AbsolutePunk regards "Daydreaming" as a song that "channels the Smashing Pumpkins at their prettiest in a cool way." According to Billboard, the song is "...not as whimsical as its subject matter, but solid nonetheless." MTV Buzzworthy describes the song as a throwback to 1990's dream pop, saying "When the chorus hits, it's a thunderclap." Popdust rates the song a 4/5, saying "The song’s sugar-rush bridge, which is capped by a grandiose rush of riffs and guitars, seems not only designed for maximum lighter (or phone)-hoisting, it’s plush enough for Williams’ song-ending assertion that she’s all right to sound like it’s being issued from a safe place fashioned by the crashing music that preceded it."

At Renowned for Sound, Jana Angeles regarded it as a "solid track", saying "...it's fantastic to see how the band have emerged from being a pop punk band into a band that isn't afraid to challenge themselves by experimenting in other musical genres." Ed Masley at The Arizona Republic ranked it as the 5th best Paramore song, commenting "Does it sound a little like a female-fronted Goo Goo Dolls in "Iris" mode? It does. But in a good way."

== Music video ==
The music video was released on November 5, 2013 and premiered on UK.MSN.com.

The video shows footage from the band's Wembley Arena show. Outside of the footage, the video shows two girls (one blonde and one brunette) getting ready to fly to London to see Paramore live they then do some sight seeing. Once they arrive to the venue, they sneak in backstage where the band members are shown. They eventually get to the concert to watch the band perform.

== Charts ==
Chart performance for "Daydreaming"
Chart (2013)	Peak position
UK Rock & Metal (OCC)	33
