= Still Into You =

2013 single by Paramore

Single by Paramore

from the album Paramore
- Released: March 14, 2013
- Recorded: 2012
- Genre: Power pop; pop rock; new wave; alternative rock; pop-punk
- Length: 3:36
- Label: Fueled by Ramen
- Songwriters: Hayley Williams; Taylor York
- Producer: Justin Meldal-Johnsen

Paramore singles chronology
"Now" (2013)	"Still Into You" (2013)	"Daydreaming" (2013)

Music video
- "Still Into You" on YouTube

Audio sample
- file; help

"Still Into You" is a song by American rock band Paramore from their self-titled fourth studio album (2013). It was released on March 14, 2013, as the second single from the album. Recorded in 2012 in Los Angeles, "Still Into You" is a departure from the sound of their previous single, "Now", and incorporates a lighter pop rock sound, while being described as "sweet" and "sugary".

The song received acclaim from music critics, who have praised the song and Hayley Williams's vocals as "catchy" and "strong and effective", as well as deeming it as one of the songs of the summer of 2013. It is among their most commercially successful singles in the United States, becoming a top-ten hit on the Mainstream Top 40, ranking at number eight on Billboard's Hot Rock Songs, and receiving double-platinum certification in the United States.

== Background ==
Paramore first performed "Still Into You" in Austin, Texas, as part of the South by Southwest festival. The song was then released as a single on March 14, 2013, and was put on Fueled by Ramen's YouTube channel as a lyric video. The lyrics are about Williams' relationship with Chad Gilbert of New Found Glory and how her feelings seem to have stayed the same since they first met.

In an interview with Spin, Williams said "'Still Into You' is definitely a love song. It's definitely happy. But to me anyway—and obviously I wrote it so maybe I'm biased, but —it's not a sappy love song. ... We've never done that before, and honestly I don't have a whole lot of experience writing love songs, or anyways lyrics that are like this."

== Composition ==
"Still Into You" has been described as an alternative dance glockenspiel and synth-infused power pop, pop rock, new wave, alternative rock, pop-punk and emo song, with skeletal guitar lines similar to that of Australian musician Gotye. It was written in the key of F major and lacks a heavy guitar riff, for which Paramore is typically known and is replaced by a back beat on the drums. James Montgomery at MTV compared the song to the new wave band the Cars, saying it could pass for one of their B-sides.

== Critical reception ==
"Still Into You" was acclaimed by music critics, who commended the song as fun and catchy, and praised Williams' vocals. Marc Zanotti at Music Feeds called the song "a poppy, upbeat, sugary sweet number". Scott Heisel of Alternative Press referred to it one of the best songs on Paramore, saying "There's no question that this is still Paramore, only it's better. The chorus hook will stay in your brain for days at a time,... and when you throw in the band's newfound embracing of electronics, you find yourself with what will ideally be one of the biggest hits of 2013." Maura Johnston from Popdust gave the song a 5 out of 5, declaring "If there's any justice in the world this'll be a song of the summer, or at least of the late spring". Joseph R. Atilano at Inquirer.net noted that ""Still Into You" is really directed to their youngest fans with its happy-go-lucky lyrics that are as cheerful as they can get and somewhat disarming in their simplicity", considering it better than the previous single "Now".

The song placed at number 95 on Rolling Stone magazine's 100 Best Songs of 2013 list and number 19 on Billboard magazine's 20 Best Songs of 2013. Ed Masley at The Arizona Republic ranked it as the 10th best Paramore song, stating ""Still Into You" is a retro-tastic hook explosion that somehow peaked at No. 83 on Billboard's Hot 100."

== Chart performance ==
The song has sold over 1,000,000 copies in the US as of December 2013. It became one of Paramore's most commercially successful singles to date in the United States, where it reached number 24 on the Billboard Hot 100, and became their first top-ten hit on the Mainstream Top 40 charts. It was included in Billboard's year-end charts, at number 100 on the Hot 100 songs of the year.

== Music video ==
The video was filmed at the Texas Federation of Women's Clubs Headquarters and was directed by Isaac Rentz. When shooting the music video, bassist Jeremy Davis said "I've realized you can't really consider it making a music video unless you get hurt, because every video, we end up in pain... It's awesome to do our own stunts; we might as well be Jackie Chan." Guitarist Taylor York said, "A lot of people would hear the song and assume it would be about the story of people still being in love, but what was so appealing about Isaac's treatment is that he wanted to capture what love feels like... He had so many ideas, and it definitely jumped out at us."

The music video features Paramore in a boat within a room filled with a balloons; Williams on a bed surrounded by birthday cakes; the trio riding around on bicycles; Williams dancing with ballerinas; and then all of Paramore are outside playing with Roman candles and sparkles with a fireworks show going on in the background.

== Charts ==
=== Weekly charts ===
Weekly chart performance for "Still Into You"
Chart (2013)	Peak position
Australia (ARIA)	5
Belgium (Ultratip Bubbling Under Flanders)	60
Canada Hot 100 (Billboard)	58
Canada CHR/Top 40 (Billboard)	31
Canada Hot AC (Billboard)	32
France (SNEP)	189
Ireland (IRMA)	6
Mexico (Billboard Ingles Airplay)	15
New Zealand (Recorded Music NZ)	14
Scottish Singles Sales (Official Charts)	13
South Korea (Gaon International Chart)	146
UK Singles (Official Charts)	15
UK Rock & Metal (Official Charts)	1
US Billboard Hot 100	24
US Adult Contemporary (Billboard)	27
US Adult Pop Airplay (Billboard)	11
US Hot Rock & Alternative Songs (Billboard)	6
US Pop Airplay (Billboard)	8

=== Year-end charts ===
2013 year-end chart performance for "Still Into You"
Chart (2013)	Position
Australia (ARIA)	51
UK Singles (OCC)	101
US Billboard Hot 100	100
US Adult Top 40 (Billboard)	43
US Mainstream Top 40 (Billboard)	46
US Hot Rock & Alternative Songs (Billboard)	17

2014 year-end chart performance for "Still Into You"
Chart (2014)	Position
US Hot Rock & Alternative Songs (Billboard)	89

== Certifications ==
Certifications and sales for "Still Into You"
Region	Certification	Certified units/sales
Australia (ARIA)	5× Platinum	350,000^{‡}
Canada (Music Canada)	3× Platinum	240,000^{‡}
New Zealand (RMNZ)	4× Platinum	120,000^{‡}
United Kingdom (BPI)	2× Platinum	1,200,000^{‡}
United States (RIAA)	2× Platinum	2,000,000^{‡}
^{‡} Sales+streaming figures based on certification alone.

== Release history ==
Release dates and formats for "Still Into You"
Region	Date	Format	Label(s)	Ref.
United States	April 23, 2013	Mainstream airplay	Fueled By Ramen	

== Cyril version ==
In 2024, Australian DJ and producer Cyril released his version with vocals by Maryjo which charted in Australia, Belgium, Poland and the Netherlands.

=== Charts ===
==== Weekly charts ====
Weekly chart performance for "Still Into You"
Chart (2024–2025)	Peak position
Australia (ARIA)	79
Belgium (Ultratop 50 Wallonia)	24
Croatia International Airplay (Top lista)	24
Estonia Airplay (TopHit)	23
Hungary (Dance Top 40)	1
Hungary (Rádiós Top 40)	1
Latvia Airplay (TopHit)	20
Lithuania Airplay (TopHit)	110
Netherlands (Dutch Top 40)	15
Netherlands (Single Top 100)	21
New Zealand Hot Singles (RMNZ)	10
Poland (Polish Airplay Top 100)	20
Poland (Polish Streaming Top 100)	19
Romania Airplay (TopHit)	87

==== Monthly charts ====
Monthly chart performance for "Still Into You"
Chart (2025)	Peak position
Estonia Airplay (TopHit)	29

==== Year-end charts ====
Year-end chart performance for "Still Into You"
Chart (2025)	Position
Australian Artist (ARIA)	7
Belgium (Ultratop 50 Flanders)	115
Belgium (Ultratop 50 Wallonia)	62
Estonia Airplay (TopHit)	32
Hungary (Dance Top 40)	10
Hungary (Rádiós Top 40)	7
Latvia Airplay (TopHit)	174
Netherlands (Dutch Top 40)	76
Netherlands (Single Top 100)	90
Poland (Polish Streaming Top 100)	56

=== Certifications ===
Certifications for "Still Into You"
Region	Certification	Certified units/sales
Australia (ARIA)	Platinum	70,000^{‡}
New Zealand (RMNZ)	Platinum	30,000^{‡}
Poland (ZPAV)	Platinum	125,000^{‡}
^{‡} Sales+streaming figures based on certification alone.
