= Anklebiters =

Song by Paramore

from the album Paramore
- Released: April 5, 2013
- Recorded: 2012
- Length: 2:17
- Label: Fueled by Ramen
- Songwriters: Hayley Williams; Taylor York; Justin Meldal-Johnsen
- Producer: Meldal-Johnsen

"Anklebiters" is a song by American rock band Paramore, and is the tenth track from their self-titled fourth studio album. The song was written by the band's lead singer Hayley Williams, guitarist Taylor York and Justin Meldal-Johnsen.

== Background ==
Hayley Williams told MTV News that this song came from a period of deep introspection and its subject matter helped frame the entire Paramore album. "The title came first, which never happens, but I just thought, I liked the term 'Anklebiters,' when you're talking about kids or babies," she said.

According to the band, the song addresses people who can't think for themselves. Williams told Spin: "To me there was this thread throughout the album of wanting to be able to grow up and move forward. And when you do that in your life, there's always people that are going to try to hold you back. Or they're going to try to tell you, 'You don't need to do this, because this is the right way to go.' Or you don't need to grow up, because this or that. And it's about those people, and it's about not listening to that but listening to your heart, and what do you want out of life? Who do you want to be? Versus all this outside influence that I think we get so caught up in, especially in the age of the Internet and all the different opinions that we hear so loudly every day.". Williams explained to Kerrang! Magazine that the song is about "embracing who you are, your differences and quirks. "Some people wanna pull you down and say you're wrong," she continued. "But you keep fighting and say, 'No, this is who I am.'".

== Critical reception ==
"Anklebiters" has received acclaim from music critics. Popdust gave the song a 4.5/5, commenting that the song was an "upbeat, scream-along return to Paramore's emo-punk roots", and calling the song's atmosphere "perfect for psyching yourself up before leaving the house for a nerve-wracking night on the town". MTV Buzzworthy says "A fuzzy, scrappy track that starts in The Strokes' garage and kicks away the haters: "Why do you care what people think?" Williams rips. Good question. Turn this one up loud enough and for 2 minutes and 17 seconds, you won't." Billboard Magazine elaborated on the title's meaning, saying that "the hip-hop community refers to naysayers as "Haters," but Paramore calls them "Anklebiters"—folks who prey on other people's actions. "Someday you're going to be the only one that you've got," Williams sings to those that should rely on their own thoughts and not what anklebiters are saying".

== Music video ==
Although the song will not be Paramore's next single, it has become special to the group, and is a track the band still wanted to release something extra for.

Though not an official single, the group still felt a special connection with "Anklebiters", and decided to have a video filmed for it. The video, directed by Jordan Bruner, has been described as "an animated joyride that not only embodies the song's high-energy, guitar-pop-driven vibe, but it also features everything from little "Pac-Man"-looking circular dust-mite things to eagles wearing pillbox hats... And dancing disembodied hands." The band members do not appear in the video.

== Video game ==
A video game based on the music video was available to play on Paramore's official website. Although it was free-to-play, it did require a registration to the site.

The game shared the animation style of the music video, but played similarly to Pac-Man. The finished product has been described as a "hipster's Pac-Man nightmare meets a collection of bad Dr. Seuss knock-off sketches."
