= Cloud (dancer) =

American dancer, director and choreographer

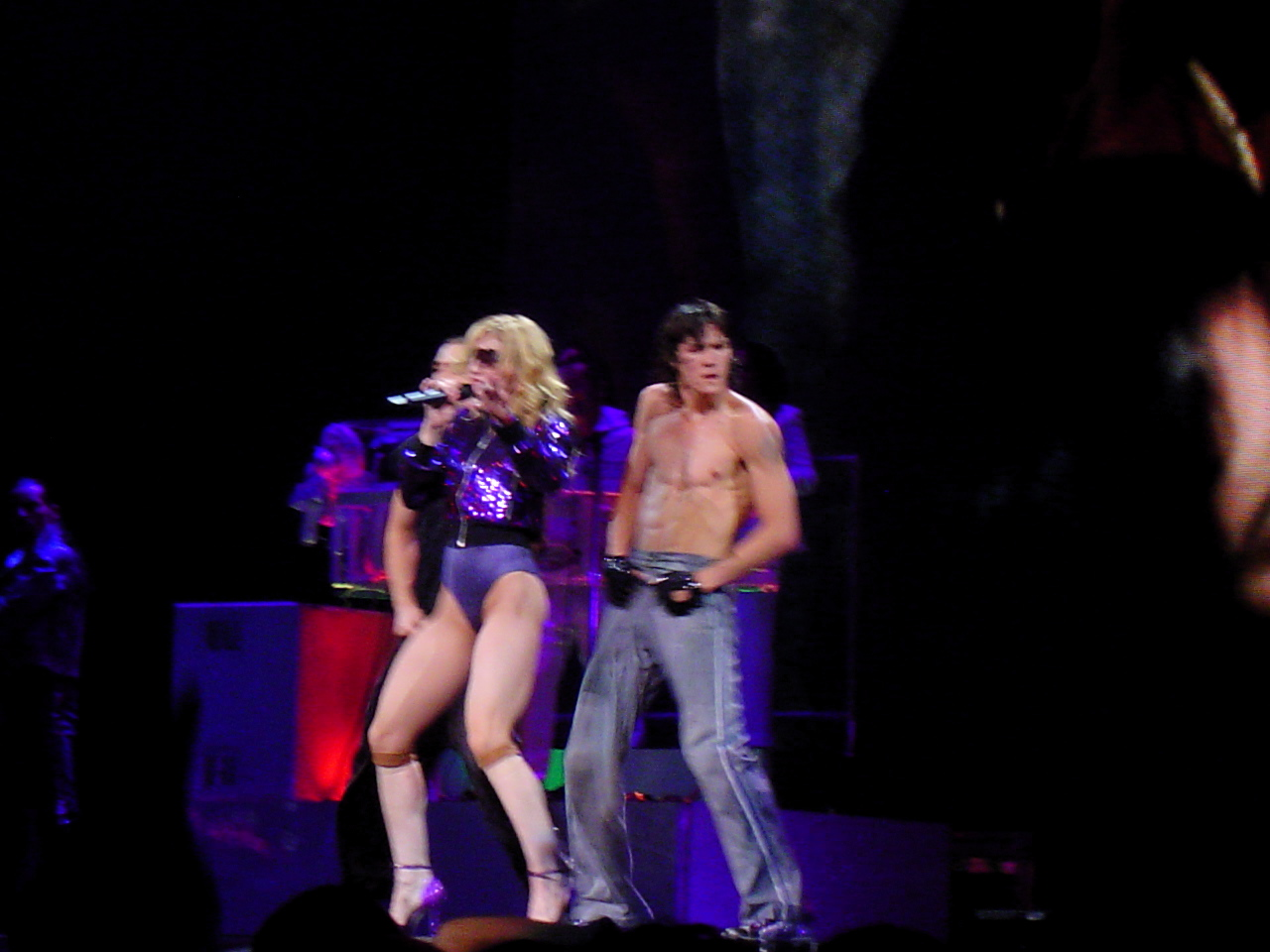
- Cloud dancing with Madonna on her Confessions Tour in Boston, MA.
- Born: Daniel Campos; May 6, 1983 (age 41); Adel, Georgia, USA
- Other names: Cloud
- Occupations: Dancer; director; choreographer
- Awards: Dancer of the Year – World of Dance Industry Award; 2012 (n/a); Grand Prize – Filmerica Challenge; 2005 Heaven Awaits

Daniel "Cloud" Campos (born May 6, 1983) is an American dancer, director, and choreographer raised in San Diego, California, and Orlando, Florida.

== Early life ==
Cloud started dancing as a b-boy when he was 11. He learned breaking from his oldest brother Kevin "Deft-1" Campos who is also a b-boy. He spent his early life in San Diego then moved to Florida when he was 12. During his time in Florida he toured with High Voltage extreme acrobatics dance team and became a member of Skill Methodz b-boy crew, which was founded in 1995 in Tampa under the name B-Boy Connection. He described what his b-boy name means in a 2011 interview with KoreanRoc.com:

When a Cloud moves, it’s always shifting and changing forms and it’s creating art on the sky; [when I dance, the] floor is the sky and I’m the Cloud creating art.

== Dance career ==
After moving to Los Angeles to pursue a career in the dance industry, he booked two tours with Madonna; first in 2004 on her Re-Invention World Tour and again in 2006 on her Confessions Tour. He also starred in Madonna's videos "Hung Up" in 2005 and "Sorry" in 2006. He also performed in the stage show Groovaloos. In 2009, he won first place with his crew Skill Methodz at the UK B-Boy Championships. Later the same year, he competed at Red Bull BC One and appeared in Shakira's music video "Did It Again" as the principal male dancer. In 2010, he appeared in the online series The LXD as The Illister and played the antagonist, Kid Darkness, in the film Step Up 3D. In 2011, he served as one of ten choreographers for Michael Jackson: The Immortal World Tour.

In October 2012, British blog The Next Hype ran an article about Cloud's appearances in two commercials by rivals Apple and Microsoft. In 2012, Cloud appeared as the lead dancer in a Microsoft Surface commercial directed by Jon M. Chu that went viral on YouTube. Three years earlier, he appeared in an iPod Nano commercial that advertised the release of the model's fifth generation, noted for the addition of a video camera. Although The Next Hype felt that Microsoft "...using [Cloud] as a figurehead for your new product after Apple used him 3 years ago is just sloppy", these instances were not the only times Cloud worked with either company. He has appeared in several iPod commercials and print ads dating back to 2004, and in 2013 he appeared as the lead dancer in another Jon Chu-directed Microsoft commercial that promoted the Surface Pro model.

== Film career ==
External videos
- "Today's the Day" short film.

Cloud first developed an interest in film-making when he was 17. He made his first short film (called The Paperboy) in an alleyway at Universal Studios Florida. He uploaded the film on YouTube and after generating positive responses he decided to continue film-making. His short film Heaven Awaits won the Grand Prize at the 2005 Filmerica Challenge. In 2011, he successfully raised over $50,000 in individual donations through Kickstarter to fund a musical called Today's the Day.

In 2013, Cloud directed the music videos "Stay the Night" by Zedd and "Now" by Paramore. He co-directed and co-choreographed the music video for "Cold Front", by singer Laura Welsh, with his then wife Tamara Levinson-Campos (with the two having since then divorced). Levinson-Campos is also the principal female dancer in the video. After being uploaded to Cloud's Vimeo channel, the website chose "Cold Front" as a Staff Pick.

In November 2014, Cloud directed the video for "Salt" by Bad Suns. Cloud has directed three music videos for Panic! at the Disco: "Emperor's New Clothes", "This Is Gospel", and "Say Amen (Saturday Night)". "This is Gospel" was also choreographed by Levinson-Campos.

In 2017, Campos was the assistant choreographer for The Greatest Showman, and earned some notice as the silent bartender who rhythmically serves drinks to Philip Carlyle (Zac Efron) and P.T. Barnum (Hugh Jackman) during the song "The Other Side".

In 2019, 2020 and 2022 respectively, Campos directed the video for "BULLET TO THE HEART", "100 Ways" and "Blow" by Jackson Wang.
