= Paramore (album) =

2013 studio album by Paramore

- Original album cover (Note: From 2022 onwards, digital streaming versions and physical re-issues of both the standard and deluxe editions of the album had their cover changed to an image of Williams from behind. It has been speculated that the album art was changed to remove Jeremy Davis, pictured left in the original image, who had had a falling out with the other members of the band, at one point being involved in a lawsuit against them.)

Studio album by Paramore
- Released: April 5, 2013
- Recorded: April 2012 ("Daydreaming"); June 27 – November 1, 2012
- Genres: Pop rock; power pop; new wave; alternative rock; pop-punk
- Length: 63:47
- Labels: Fueled by Ramen; Atlantic
- Producers: Justin Meldal-Johnsen; Taylor York

Paramore chronology
Singles Club (2011)	Paramore (2013)	The Holiday Sessions (2013)

Alternative cover
- Deluxe cover

Alternative cover
- 2022 re-issue cover

Singles from Paramore
- 1. "Now" Released: January 22, 2013; 2. "Still Into You" Released: March 14, 2013; 3. "Daydreaming" Released: December 2, 2013; 4. "Ain't It Fun" Released: February 4, 2014

Paramore is the fourth studio album by the American rock band Paramore, released on April 5, 2013, through Fueled by Ramen. It was recorded between April and November 2012 and produced by Justin Meldal-Johnsen, with lead guitarist Taylor York co-producing on four tracks. It is the first album without guitarist Josh Farro, the only album without drummer Zac Farro, and the final album with bassist Jeremy Davis before his departure in 2015.

The band described the album as being a "statement" and a reintroduction of the band to the world and to themselves. In contrast to the band's previous work, the production of Paramore showcases the band's experimentation with new musical genres, such as new wave and funk rock, and features three acoustic interludes.

Paramore was acclaimed by music critics, who praised the band's maturity and experimentation in terms of musicianship as well as Williams' vocals and overall presence on the album. Several publications included the album in their year-end lists, including The A.V. Club and The Guardian. It was a commercial success, debuting at number one on the US Billboard 200 with first-week sales of 106,000 copies. The album also topped the charts in Argentina, Australia, Brazil, Ireland, and New Zealand, where it became their first album to reach the peak. It also became their second chart topper in the United Kingdom. In March 2016, Paramore was certified platinum by the Recording Industry Association of America (RIAA), for sales exceeding 1,000,000 units in the United States. The group followed the record release with The Self-Titled Tour in promotion, with European, North American, Asian, Latin American, and Oceania legs announced. In 2014, the band co-headlined Monumentour with Fall Out Boy. A deluxe edition of the album was released on November 24, 2014, which includes two new tracks, a demo, a re-recorded version of "Hate to See Your Heart Break", and live tracks of songs from their previous albums.

Four singles were released from the album: "Now", "Still Into You", "Daydreaming", and the Grammy-winning song "Ain't It Fun". "Still Into You" and "Ain't It Fun" have reached top ten positions on various charts in the United States and have been certified double platinum by the RIAA, making Paramore the first of the band's albums to have produced more than one double-platinum single.

In November 2022, the band changed the album cover on streaming services to an image of Hayley Williams shot from behind. The change is speculated to be due to legal disputes between the band and former bassist Jeremy Davis.

== Background and recording ==
The recording of Paramore began in April 2012 with the song "Daydreaming". After a brief pause, recording resumed on June 27 of that year and ended on November 1, 2012. It is the first Paramore album released after the departure of Josh and Zac Farro, both of whom left the band in 2010.

The album was produced by Justin Meldal-Johnsen, longtime bassist for Beck and Nine Inch Nails, who has previously produced records for M83 and Neon Trees. In an interview with Electronic Musician, Meldal-Johnsen stated he wanted "the album to sound very visceral and a little bit less locked down and computerized, more 1981 than 2012, with a nod to 2016." In an interview with Digital Spy, Taylor York stated "I don't think we've ever been so proud and satisfied with something we've done." On June 29, 2012, the band had confirmed that Nine Inch Nails and Angels & Airwaves drummer Ilan Rubin would be recording drums for the album.

In an interview with Rolling Stone, lead vocalist Hayley Williams explained, "That whole time for our band was such a dark season. It was emotionally exhausting, and by the time we got around to the point where we were going to start writing, we just really wanted to enjoy the process of making an album" when asked about the direction of the band after Brand New Eyes. Regarding the album being self-titled, Williams explained "The self-titled aspect of the whole thing is definitely a statement. I feel like it's not only reintroducing the band to the world, but even to ourselves ... By the end of it, it felt like we're a new band." She also stated that she was inspired by Blondie's and Siouxsie and the Banshees' records when writing the new songs: "They've got so much heart and soul in them." It is the final album with bassist Jeremy Davis before his departure in 2015.

== Promotion and release ==
On December 6, 2012, Paramore revealed the name of the album and the release date, as well as the name of the first single from the album. The track list was announced on January 18, 2013, by Alternative Press. During the 2013 Soundwave Festival, Paramore held a listening party in Sydney, New South Wales on February 26, 2013, followed by Melbourne, Victoria two days later, run by Australian Music Channel, Channel V. Williams revealed a section of the lyrics for the song "Part II" which the winners were able to hear at the listening parties on a LiveJournal post. Williams told fans that "'Let The Flames Begin' has been a favorite of ours to play live, as well as being a favorite of most people who come out to our shows.... We wanted it to have a sequel. 'Part II' it is!"

The vinyl version of the album was streamed beginning on April 1, 2013, for four days, with each day playing one of the four sides. The album was then officially released on April 5, 2013. The band played an acoustic version of "Hate to See Your Heart Break" on the BBC Radio 1 Live Lounge on April 3, 2013, announcing that on the same night, the full song would be premiered on their official website. On April 20, 2013, the band released an EP for Record Store Day, titled The Holiday Sessions, released exclusively on a 7" vinyl, and is composed of the three interludes from this album. A music video for "Anklebiters" was released on June 25, 2013. The song, however, was not released as a single.

The Self-Titled Tour took place from October 15 to November 27, 2013. The Self-Titled Tour took the band through 27 cities across North America, including their first headline show at Madison Square Garden. On August 22, 2013, the band announced their own cruise, called the "PARAHOY! Cruise", sailing from Miami to the Bahamas and back on board the Norwegian Pearl, which took place from March 7 to March 11, 2014. On January 9, 2014, the band, along with Fall Out Boy, announced a co-headlining North American tour dubbed, "Monumentour", which took place from June 19 to August 31, 2014. On January 22, 2015, Paramore announced "Writing The Future", a round of small shows across the United States, closing out the Paramore touring cycle. It lasted from April 27 to May 25, 2015.

A deluxe edition of the album was released on November 24, 2014. The deluxe edition includes a new version of "Hate To See Your Heart Break" featuring Joy Williams, Paramore's first collaboration.

In November 2022, the band changed the album cover on streaming services to an image of Hayley Williams shot from behind. The denim jacket, worn by Williams, reads "Grow Up", the name of a song on the album. The change is speculated to be due to legal disputes between the band and former bassist Jeremy Davis. The 10th anniversary vinyl reissue, released in January 2024, uses this cover.

=== Singles ===
On January 5, 2013, Paramore released a teaser of the lead single "Now", revealing a snippet of the song and the release date of the single, which was January 22, 2013. Paramore streamed the song on their website on January 21, and the song was then made available for sale along with an album pre-order through iTunes the next day. In the UK, "Now" was instead released January 24, 2013. The music video for "Now" was directed by Daniel "Cloud" Campos and premiered live on MTV on February 11.

The album's second single, "Still Into You", was released on March 14, 2013. A lyric video for "Still Into You" was uploaded to YouTube a day earlier, after the band performed it live for the first time at the 2013 South by Southwest festival in Austin, Texas. On September 18, 2013, "Still Into You" was certified platinum by the RIAA. "Daydreaming" serves as the third single from the album. It was released on December 2, 2013. The music video premiered on November 5 in the UK MSN.

"Ain't It Fun" is the fourth single from the album, and was released on February 4, 2014. A music video for the song was planned, but was put on hold in favor of a music video for "Daydreaming", also, as informed by Williams, the band was unhappy with how the video turned out. A new video for "Ain't It Fun" was filmed and premiered on January 29, 2014. "Ain't It Fun" won the award for Best Rock Song at the 57th Annual Grammy Awards, becoming the band's first Grammy win. On June 18, 2014, "Ain't It Fun" was certified platinum by the RIAA and then, on July 8, 2015, double platinum. Shortly after, "Still Into You" received double platinum certification as well from the RIAA.

=== Other songs ===
Though not released as a single, the band released a music video for "Anklebiters" on June 26, 2013. Soon after, the band released a free to play video game similar to Pac-Man that is based on the "Anklebiters" video.

"Hate to See Your Heart Break" was re-recorded in 2014 to feature Joy Williams on vocals for inclusion on the deluxe edition of the album. A video for the song premiered on November 24, 2014. It reached number 23 on the Billboard Hot Rock Songs chart.

The album consists of three interludes (Moving On, I'm Not Angry Anymore & Holiday). They all have raw vocals delivered by Hayley Williams and only have a simple ukulele in the background.

== Composition ==
Josh Bell of Las Vegas Weekly called the album a "collection of catchy, energetic pop-rock songs". Ben Rayner of the Toronto Star stated the band abandoned the emo genre in favor of power pop. At Entertainment Weekly, Kyle Anderson characterized it as a "Blondie-indebted 21st-century new-wave album". Matt Collar of AllMusic condisers this album to be a move towards "a multi-layered '80s synth-pop sound." According to Justin Cober-Lake of PopMatters, "[the album has] touches of new wave, pop-punk, funk, alt-rock, pop, balladry, and even a series of ukelele interludes." PopMatters also noted that the album "careens between edgy hard rock (“Fast in My Car”, “Now”, “Anklebiters”), ‘80s R&B (“Ain't It Fun”), power pop (“Daydreaming”), tender balladry (“Hate to See Your Heart Break”), and lavish Spector-esque melodrama (“(One of Those) Crazy Girls”)."

== Critical reception ==
Professional ratings
Aggregate scores
Source	Rating
AnyDecentMusic?	6.9/10
Metacritic	81/100
Review scores
Source	Rating
AllMusic	4.5/5 stars
Alternative Press	5/5 stars
The A.V. Club	B+
Entertainment Weekly	A−
The Guardian	4/5 stars
NME	7/10
The Observer	3/5 stars
Rolling Stone	3.5/5 stars
Spin	8/10
USA Today	3.5/4 stars

Upon its release, Paramore was acclaimed by music critics. At Metacritic, which assigns a "weighted average" rating out of 100 from selected independent ratings and reviews from mainstream critics, the album received a Metascore of 81, based on 20 reviews, indicating "universal acclaim". Matt Collar, writing for AllMusic, declared "The record's collaborative foundation crackles on every track, but Hayley Williams, a ballsy, extroverted frontwoman with a voice big enough to stop time, proves unequivocally to be the cunning talent of the band, no matter how vital York and Davis may be". Collar regards it their best album. Scott Heisel of Alternative Press praised the diversity of the album, calling the album "a sprawling, 17-song, 64-minute monster", and regarded it as the best music Paramore have ever created. Entertainment Weekly's Kyle Anderson gave the album an A−, where he stated "Paramore are making evolutionary leaps into something both refreshingly well-adjusted and genuinely new", and highlighted "Ain't It Fun" and "Proof" as the album's best tracks. The USA Today writer Brian Mansfield found that on the album the band "has super-sized its sound". Mansfield also commented that "Williams' sarcasm seems less forced than her enthusiasm, still, Paramore shows a band determined to get out of the misery business."

At AbsolutePunk, Jack Appleby said "Instead of pursuing all things epic or intentionally moving to a specific sound, the band had a blast pursuing every genre under the sun, creating a damn good album in the process ... Chances are you won't dedicate undivided attention to Paramore, but you'll regularly queue the whole record." He concluded with that the album isn't for everyone, but has something that anyone could enjoy.

Rebecca Nicholson of The Guardian regarded the album as a pay off, despite the band "switching it up", where she states "...this is more loose and playful, while still indulging the band's ability to pull off mammoth, arena-friendly choruses." She regarded the album a little too long, however. David Renshaw at NME observed "...this mainstream rebirth feels like a transitional step to something gigantic." Jon Pareles from The New York Times found that the band's songwriting survived the departure of Josh Farro. In addition, Pareles noted that they "have pushed the band beyond pop-punk without abandoning momentum or the big, catchy chorus."

By contrast, Sputnikmusic's staff reviewer Channing Freeman was highly critical of the album, giving it a one and a half out of five as well as calling it, "fucking foolishness". Freeman criticized the exclusion of J. Farro and the songwriting, stating "I guess the sad conclusion here is that Paramore needs Josh Farro, who maybe could have tempered all of the crazy fucking songwriting decisions that were made on Paramore."

=== Accolades ===
End Of Year Lists:

Publication	Accolade	Year	Rank	Ref
The A.V. Club	The 23 Best Albums of 2013	2013	18	
Kerrang!	Best Albums of 2013	2013	6	
The Guardian	Best Albums of 2013	2013	21	
PopMatters	The 75 Best Albums of 2013	2013	58	
The Village Voice	100 Best Albums of 2013	2013	34	
Drowned in Sound	Favorite Albums of 2013	2013	4	
AllMusic	AllMusic Best of 2013	2013	No Ranking	

End Of Decade Lists:

Publication	Accolade	Year	Rank	Ref
Kerrang!	The 75 Best Albums of The 2010s	2019	68	
Billboard	Top 100 Albums of The 2010s	2019	37	
AllMusic	200 Best Albums of The Decade	2019	No Ranking	

In 2015, Spin ranked it the 228th best album out of 300 from 1985 to 2014.

== Commercial performance ==
The album has been a major commercial success worldwide, debuting at number one in eight countries including the UK, Ireland, Scotland, Argentina, New Zealand, Brazil and Australia (where it was the eighth consecutive number one debut on the chart and also the 32nd self-titled album to top the Australian chart). The album also peaked within the top 20 of 9 other countries. In the US, the album debuted at number one on the Billboard 200 chart, with first week sales of 106,000 copies. This marks the first Paramore album to reach the top spot on the chart.

"Still Into You" charted within the top 10 in Australia and Ireland and reached the top 20 in several others. The single topped the UK rock chart and peaked at number 14 in the singles chart, thus becoming the band's second highest-charting single in that country, behind "Ignorance" from the band's previous album Brand New Eyes. In the US, the song peaked at number 24, matching "The Only Exception" from the same album as the band's highest-charting single at the time. It also peaked at number 6 in the US Rock Chart and number 8 in the US Mainstream Top 40. "Ain't It Fun" shared similar success, charting within the top 10 in Canada and Hungary. It eventually became Paramore's best selling single to date in the US, charting at number ten in the Billboard 100, number 2 in the US Mainstream Top 40, and number 1 the US Rock Chart and Adult Top 40. The single marks the first time a Paramore song has reached the Top 10 in the US.

== Track listing ==
All tracks are written by Hayley Williams and Taylor York, except where noted. Produced by Justin Meldal-Johnsen (1–21) and Taylor York (2, 3, 6, 16, 21).

No.	Title	Writer(s)	Length
1.	"Fast in My Car"	Hayley Williams; Taylor York; Justin Meldal-Johnsen	3:42
2.	"Now"		4:07
3.	"Grow Up"		3:50
4.	"Daydreaming"		4:31
5.	"Interlude: Moving On"		1:30
6.	"Ain't It Fun"		4:56
7.	"Part II"	Williams; York; Meldal-Johnsen	4:41
8.	"Last Hope"		5:09
9.	"Still Into You"		3:36
10.	"Anklebiters"	Williams; York; Meldal-Johnsen	2:17
11.	"Interlude: Holiday"	Williams; Jeremy Davis	1:09
12.	"Proof"	Williams; York; Meldal-Johnsen	3:15
13.	"Hate to See Your Heart Break"		5:09
14.	"(One of Those) Crazy Girls"		3:32
15.	"Interlude: I'm Not Angry Anymore"		0:52
16.	"Be Alone"		3:40
17.	"Future"		7:51
Total length:			63:47

Deluxe edition (digital-only)
No.	Title	Writer(s)	Length
18.	"Hate to See Your Heart Break" (featuring Joy Williams)		5:12
19.	"Escape Route"		2:57
20.	"Native Tongue"		3:13
21.	"Tell Me It's Okay" (demo)	Williams; York; Meldal-Johnsen	2:43
22.	"Still Into You" (live at Red Rocks)		4:30
23.	"Decode" (live at Red Rocks)	Williams; Josh Farro; York	4:24
24.	"The Only Exception" (live at Red Rocks)	Williams; Farro	4:39
25.	"Brick by Boring Brick" (live at Red Rocks)	Williams; Farro	4:53
26.	"Let the Flames Begin" (live at Red Rocks)	Williams; Farro	7:06
27.	"Part II" (live at Red Rocks)	Williams; York; Meldal-Johnsen	4:59
28.	"Proof" (live at Red Rocks)	Williams; York; Meldal-Johnsen	3:31
29.	"Ain't It Fun" (live at Red Rocks)		6:09
Total length:			118:03

Rdio, limited edition and Japanese bonus tracks
No.	Title	Length
18.	"Escape Route"	2:57
19.	"Native Tongue"	3:13
Total length:		69:57

== Personnel ==
Credits retrieved from Tidal and album liner notes.

Paramore

- Hayley Williams – lead vocals (all tracks), backing vocals (tracks 1–4, 6–10, 12–14, 16–20), keyboards (tracks 1–4, 6–10, 12–14, 16–18), synthesizers
- Jeremy Davis – bass guitar (tracks 1–4, 6–14, 16–29), backing vocals (tracks 1–4, 6–10, 12–14, 16–20), keyboards, synthesizers
- Taylor York – guitar (tracks 1–4, 6–10, 12–14, 16–29), percussion (tracks 1–4, 6–10, 12–14, 16–21), additional drums (tracks 1–4, 6–10, 12–14, 16–20, 26, 27), keyboards (tracks 1, 3, 4, 6–10, 12–14, 16–20), backing vocals (tracks 1–4, 6–10, 12–14, 16–20), ukulele (tracks 5, 11, 15), record production (tracks 2, 3, 6, 16, 21), engineering (track 21), synthesizers, programming

Additional musicians

- Ilan Rubin – drums (tracks 1–4, 6–10, 12–14, 16–21), percussion (tracks 1–4, 6–10, 12–14, 16–21), backing vocals (tracks 1–4, 6–10, 12–14, 16–20)
- Justin Meldal-Johnsen – percussion (tracks 1–4, 6–10, 12–14, 16–20), keyboards (tracks 1, 2, 4, 6–10, 12, 14, 16–20), record production (tracks 1–21), engineering (tracks 1–20), synthesizers, programming
- Carlos de la Garza – percussion (tracks 1–4, 6–10, 12–14, 16–20)
- Ken Andrews – keyboards (tracks 1, 2), backing vocals (tracks 2, 16)
- Vincent Brantley – choir direction, vocal contracting (track 6)
- Sean Dancy – choir (track 6)
- Katherine Dancy – choir (track 6)
- Brandon Hampton – choir (track 6)
- Yolanda Harris-Dancy – choir (track 6)
- Joslyn James – choir (track 6)
- Talitha Manor – choir (track 6)
- Roger Joseph Manning Jr. – string arrangement (tracks 13, 14)
- Steve Aho – copying (tracks 13, 14)
- Vanessa Freebairn-Smith – cello, string contracting (tracks 13, 14)
- Caroline Campbell – violin (tracks 6, 13, 14), concertmaster (tracks 13, 14)
- Erik Arvinder – violin (tracks 13, 14)
- Alma Fernandez – viola (tracks 13, 14)
- Sam Fischer – violin (tracks 13, 14)
- Songa Lee – violin (tracks 13, 14)
- Luke Maurer – violin (tracks 3, 13, 14)
- Kathleen Sloan – violin (tracks 13, 14)
- Joy Williams – guest vocals (track 18)
- Jon Howard – guitar, keyboards, backing vocals (tracks 22–29)
- Justin York – guitar, backing vocals (tracks 22–29)
- Aaron Gillespie – drums (tracks 22–29)

Technical

- Carlos de la Garza – engineering (tracks 1–21)
- Kyle Black – engineering (tracks 5, 11, 15)
- Mike Schuppan – engineering (tracks 5, 11, 15, 18), engineering assistance (tracks 1–4, 6–10, 12–14, 16, 17, 19, 20)
- David Schwerkholt – engineering assistance (tracks 1–20)
- Ken Andrews – audio mixing (tracks 1–20)
- Jon Howard – audio mixing (track 21)
- Ted Jensen – audio mastering (tracks 1–20)

Design

- Doug Cunningham – art direction, design
- Jason Noto – art direction, design
- Pamela Littky – photography
- JT Daly – logo artwork, song typography
- Brian Ranney – packaging management

== Charts ==
=== Weekly charts ===
Weekly chart performance for Paramore
Chart (2013–2024)	Peak position
Argentine Albums (CAPIF)	1
Australian Albums (ARIA)	1
Austrian Albums (Ö3 Austria)	13
Belgian Albums (Ultratop Flanders)	33
Belgian Albums (Ultratop Wallonia)	66
Brazilian Albums (ABPD)	1
Canadian Albums (Billboard)	3
Dutch Albums (MegaCharts)	18
Finnish Albums (Suomen virallinen lista)	10
German Albums (Media Control)	8
Hungarian Physical Albums (MAHASZ)	15
Irish Albums (IRMA)	1
Italian Albums (FIMI)	13
Japanese Albums (Oricon)	21
Mexican Albums (AMPROFON)	4
New Zealand Albums (RMNZ)	1
Polish Albums (ZPAV)	26
Portuguese Albums (AFP)	17
Scottish Albums (OCC)	1
Swiss Albums (Schweizer Hitparade)	18
UK Albums (OCC)	1
UK Rock & Metal Albums (OCC)	1
US Billboard 200	1
US Top Rock Albums (Billboard)	1
US Top Alternative Albums (Billboard)	1

=== Monthly charts ===
Monthly chart performance for Paramore
Chart (2013)	Peak position
Argentine Monthly Albums (CAPIF)	10

=== Year-end charts ===
Year-end chart performance for Paramore
Chart (2013)	Position
Australian Albums (ARIA)	51
UK Albums (OCC)	76
US Billboard 200	95
US Top Alternative Albums (Billboard)	17
US Top Rock Albums (Billboard)	25

Chart (2014)	Position
US Billboard 200	135
US Top Alternative Albums (Billboard)	19
US Top Rock Albums (Billboard)	26

== Certifications ==
Certifications and sales for Paramore
Region	Certification	Certified units/sales
Australia (ARIA)	Gold	35,000^{^}
Canada (Music Canada)	Platinum	80,000^{‡}
New Zealand (RMNZ)	2× Platinum	30,000^{‡}
United Kingdom (BPI)	Platinum	300,000^{‡}
United States (RIAA)	Platinum	1,000,000^{‡}
^{^} Shipments figures based on certification alone.^{‡} Sales+streaming figures based on certification alone.

== Release history ==
Release dates for Paramore
Region	Date	Label	Version	Format
Australia / Finland / Germany / Ireland	April 5, 2013	Fueled by Ramen (USA), Atlantic (worldwide)	Standard	12" vinyl, CD, digital download
United Kingdom	April 8, 2013	Fueled by Ramen (USA), Atlantic (worldwide)	Standard	12" vinyl, CD, digital download
Worldwide	April 9, 2013	Fueled by Ramen (USA), Atlantic (worldwide)	Standard	12" vinyl, CD, digital download
Worldwide	November 24, 2014	Fueled by Ramen (USA), Atlantic (worldwide)	Deluxe	Digital download
Worldwide	January 5, 2024	Fueled by Ramen (USA), Atlantic (worldwide)	Standard	Vinyl (reissue)

== See also ==
- List of number-one albums of 2013 (Australia)
- List of number-one albums of 2013 (Ireland)
- List of number-one albums from the 2010s (New Zealand)
- List of UK Albums Chart number ones of the 2010s
- List of Billboard 200 number-one albums of 2013
