= Jeremy Davis =

American musician (born 1985)

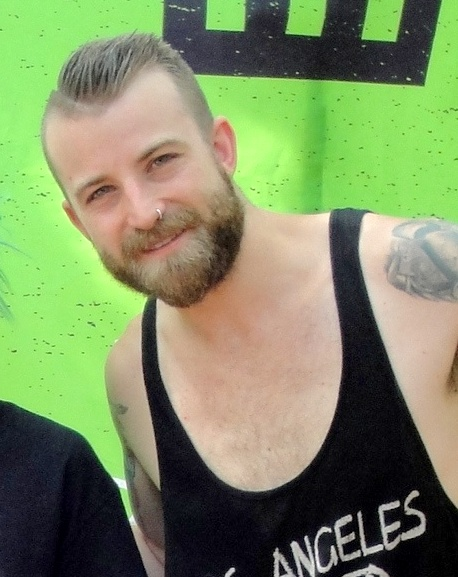
- Davis with Paramore in 2014

Background information
- Also known as: Jerm
- Born: Jeremiah Clayton Davis; February 8, 1985 (age 41); Little Rock, Arkansas, U.S.
- Genres: Alternative rock; pop rock; pop-punk; emo; hip-hop
- Occupations: Musician; songwriter; rapper
- Instruments: Bass guitar; vocals
- Years active: 2004–present
- Formerly of: Paramore
- Spouse: Kathryn Camsey (m. 2011)

Jeremiah Clayton Davis (born February 8, 1985), also known as Jerm, is an American musician, songwriter, and rapper. He was the bassist for the rock band Paramore from their inception in 2004 until his departure in December 2015.

== Early life ==
Jeremiah Clayton Davis was born on February 8, 1985 in Little Rock, Arkansas. In 2002, at the age of 17, he was living in Franklin, Tennessee, where he played in a funk cover band called The Factory, where he met Hayley Williams. Through Williams, Davis met the other members, brothers Josh and Zac Farro, then forming Paramore. Davis admitted that due to Zac's age (14 at the time) he thought people wouldn't take them seriously until they saw him play.

== Paramore ==
Paramore was founded in Franklin, Tennessee, in 2004 by the brothers Josh Farro (lead guitar/backing vocals) and Zac Farro (drums). Taylor York was also a part of the band at the beginning, but his parents wanted him to finish school first. (He later returned in 2007.) Later, they asked Hayley Williams (lead vocals/keyboards) to join the band, and through Williams, Davis (bass guitar) joined as well. In 2005, John Janick, founder of record label Fueled by Ramen, signed a contract with them. Prior to forming Paramore, the other members of what was soon to be Paramore had been "edgy about the whole female thing" of having Williams as singer, but as they were good friends, she began writing with them, and eventually became a member.

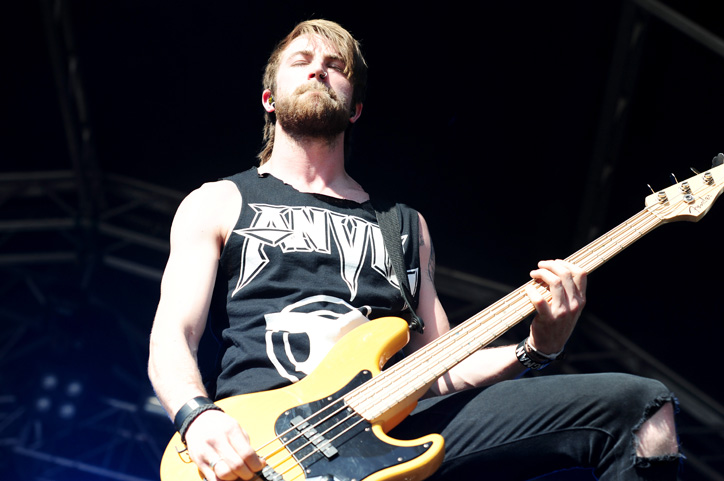
Davis at the Soundwave Festival with Paramore, 2010

The band was eventually signed to a deal on Fueled by Ramen. As they were recording their first album All We Know Is Falling in Orlando, Florida, Davis told the other members his intentions to quit the band. Paramore released the album without him. For this time, Davis was replaced by John Hembree. He rejoined soon afterwards and was present on the band's second album, Riot!. Davis also plays bass on the live albums The Final Riot! and Live in the UK. The band's third album, Brand New Eyes, was released on September 29, 2009. Their fourth album, Paramore, was released in 2013. In 2014, Davis was nominated for Best Bassist at the Alternative Press Music Awards.

It was announced on December 14, 2015, that Davis would no longer be in the band, and that Paramore would continue as a duo. In February 2016, Davis became embroiled in a legal battle with Williams and Taylor York over ownership and authorship of the songs and a portion of the royalties from Paramore's self-titled album, as well as a share of the band's touring revenue and other income. Davis claimed Varoom Whoa, the business entity that operates Paramore, was a partnership, and that Williams and York are also partners. The business denied this, claiming Williams and York are employees (York also admitted this himself), that Davis was paid what he earned during his time in the band, and that while Williams is the only one signed to Atlantic Records, she shared her personal earnings with the band out of a sense of camaraderie.

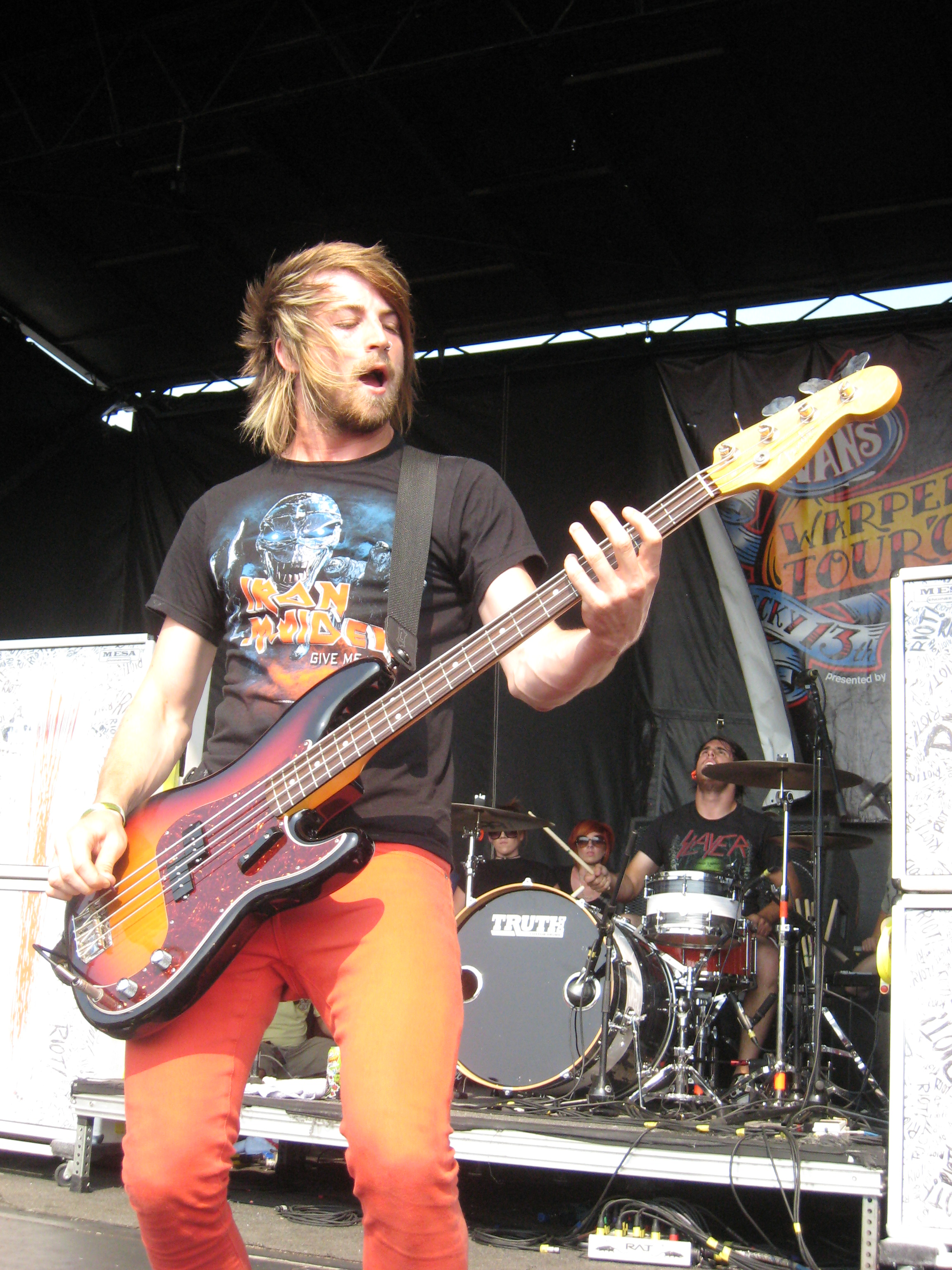
Davis playing with Paramore at the 2007 Vans Warped Tour

== Other work ==
Davis co-produced and played bass on the B.o.B. song "Violet Vibrato", released in 2015. Davis launched a record label named Post Trap Entertainment in October 2020. On May 7, 2021, Davis released his solo debut album, Grand Ole Opportunity.

== Personal life ==
On September 30, 2011, Davis married British actress Kathryn Camsey. The couple's first child, Bliss Belle Buttercup Davis, was born on December 28, 2013.

== Discography ==
=== Studio albums ===
- Grand Ole Opportunity (2021)

=== With Paramore ===
- Riot! (2007)
- Brand New Eyes (2009)
- Paramore (2013)
