= Taylor York =

American guitarist (born 1989)

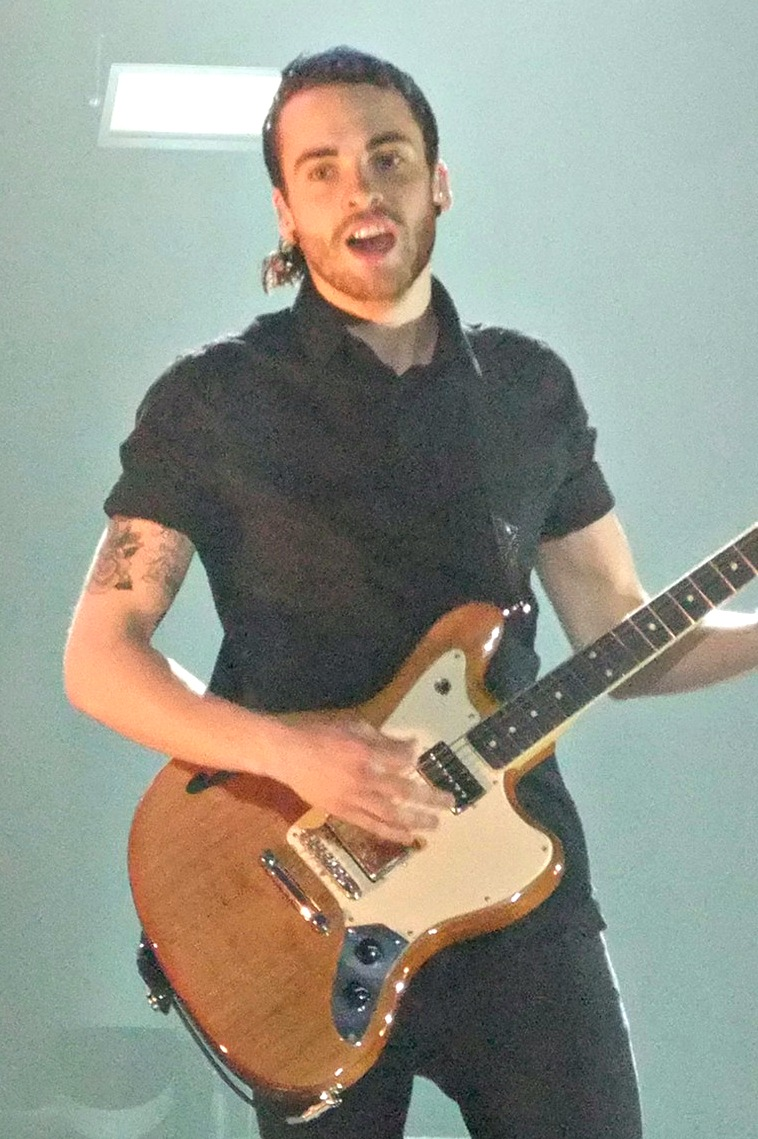
- York performing with Paramore in 2014

Background information
- Born: Taylor Benjamin York; December 17, 1989 (age 36); Nashville, Tennessee, U.S.
- Genres: Pop-punk; emo; pop rock; alternative rock; power pop; new wave
- Occupations: Musician; songwriter; record producer
- Instruments: Guitar; drums; keyboards; vocals
- Years active: 2004–2005; 2007–present
- Member of: Paramore

Taylor Benjamin York (born December 17, 1989) is an American musician, best known as the lead guitarist for the rock band Paramore.

== Biography ==
York was born the youngest of three boys on December 17, 1989, and raised in Nashville, Tennessee. His father is Peter York, former chairman and CEO of Capitol Christian Music Group. Peter is also a guitarist and taught the instrument to both Taylor and his elder brother Justin. Taylor's eldest brother, Chris, is the Senior Director of A&R at Capitol Records. His brother Justin was a touring member of Relient K and was a touring guitarist for Paramore until 2022.

York had been in a band with the Farro brothers (Josh and Zac) months before the two met Hayley Williams. Zac Farro introduced York to Williams at a high school football game, and they hit it off right away. York took part in writing songs such as "Conspiracy" for Paramore's debut album, All We Know Is Falling, and bonus track "O Star", which was the first song York wrote with Williams alone just after they met, when they were 12 and 13 years old. York has played with Paramore since 2007.

In September 2022, York confirmed that he is in a relationship with Williams.

York has mentioned having attention deficit hyperactivity disorder.

== Influences ==
York has stated that his favorite artists include mewithoutYou, Radiohead, Kent, Yann Tiersen, At the Drive-In, Failure, Björk, Kadawatha, and Paper Route. More recently in interviews, he has cited Afrobeat music as a big influence in his writing for After Laughter. Talking Heads, Fleetwood Mac, Blondie, Paul Simon, The Strokes, Thomas Mapfumo, Tame Impala, and The Cure were also named influences and favorite artists of his.

== Paramore ==
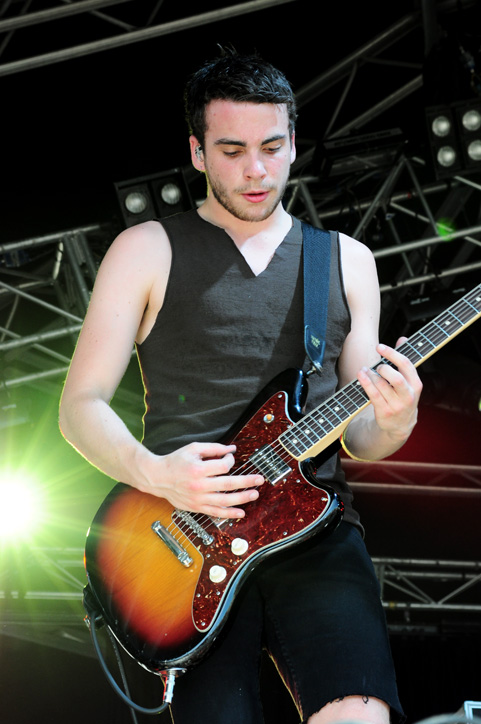
York performing at 2010 Soundwave Festival

York had done backup vocals when he was younger for the band, before All We Know Is Falling. He joined Paramore after the departure of Hunter Lamb in 2007 as their rhythm guitarist. In the liner notes for the group's second album, Riot!, Hayley Williams, Josh Farro, and Zac Farro included him on their list of "thank yous". He also helped write "That's What You Get" and bonus track "Stop This Song", which his brother Justin York helped write.

After the release of Riot!, Paramore released a live album, The Final Riot!. York was credited as a member of the band in the liner notes of the latter and was later officially acknowledged by Paramore as an official member on June 15, 2009. After Josh and Zac Farro left the band, Williams said that she was sure York would leave the band as well. York said in interview: “When it went down, it was hard for me to make a decision. I just wasn't ready. I broke down, and started crying at one point, and I just knew that I wasn't done and that I loved being in a band with Jeremy and Hayley so much. I still had a lot more to do with the band, so I just looked forward and did it.” Williams also stated that she was not that close to Taylor at the time. They finally met up for coffee after attending a show together, and Williams recalls crying in her car afterward and knew the band was going to be okay with York staying. Since then, they became close again and have since grown closer. York has taken part in the writing and recording of their albums since.

Along with band member and co-writer Hayley Williams, York was nominated for and won the Grammy Award for Best Rock Song at the 2015 ceremony for the song "Ain't It Fun".

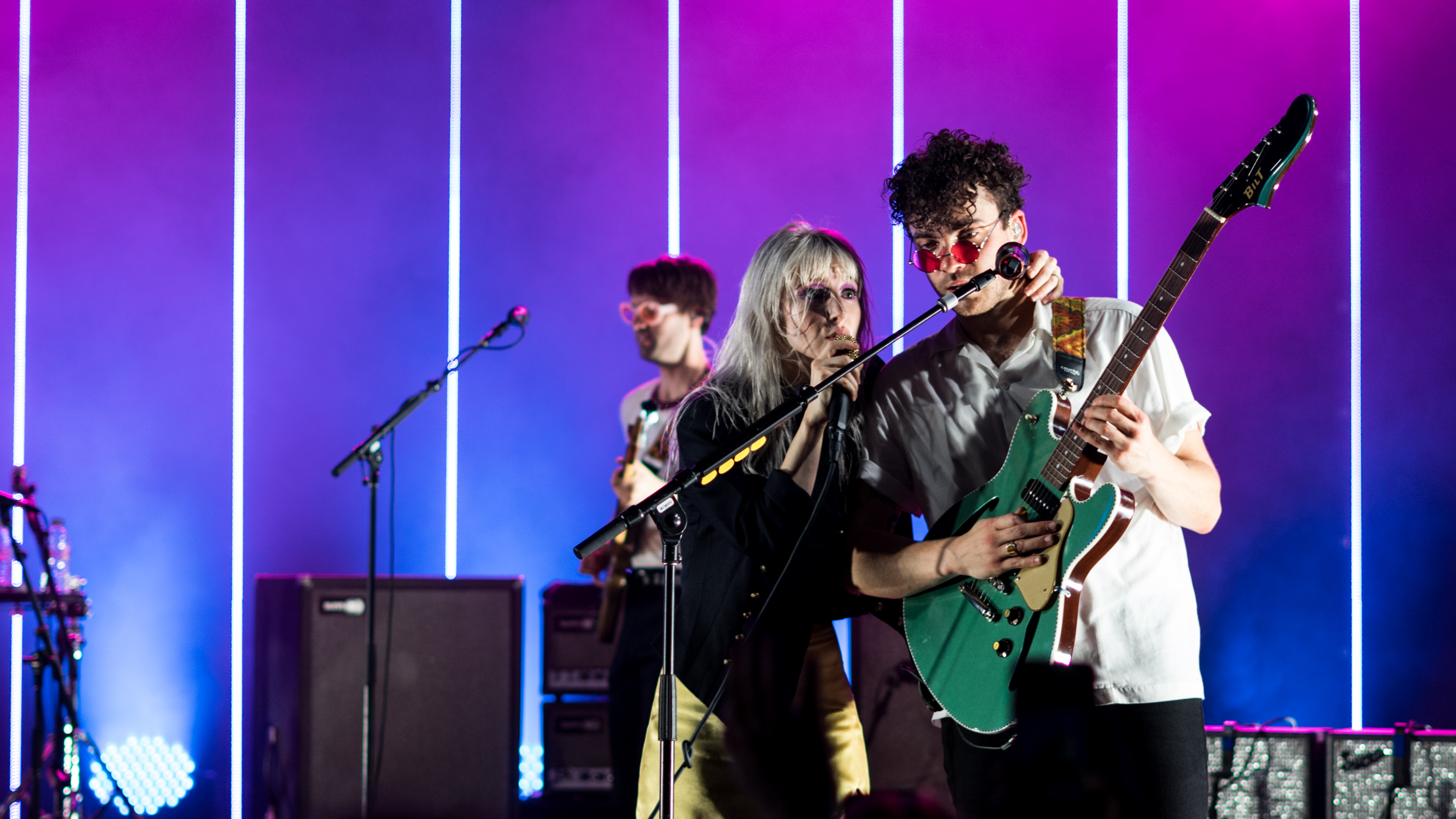
York and Williams performing together at Royal Albert Hall

In 2015, Williams quietly left Paramore for a brief period due to depression. York then remained the only member of Paramore, as bassist Jeremy Davis later left the band and embroiled York and Williams in a lawsuit over ownership and authorship of songs on Paramore's self-titled fourth record. Williams has praised York as someone who helped keep her alive during her depression. She also cites him as the reason Paramore is still a band and did not break up.

== Discography ==
=== With Paramore ===
- Brand New Eyes (2009) – guitar, glockenspiel, keyboards
- Singles Club (2011) – guitar, drums
- Paramore (2013) – guitar, keyboards, ukulele, percussion, programming, additional drums
- After Laughter (2017) – backing vocals, guitars, keyboards, programming, percussion, marimba, production, additional mixing, engineering
- This Is Why (2023) – backing vocals, glockenspiel, guitar, keyboards, programming, vibraphone, composition

=== Guest ===
Hayley Williams

- Petals for Armor I – production, additional instrumentation
- Petals for Armor II – production, additional instrumentation
- Petals for Armor – production, additional instrumentation

Taylor Swift

- Speak Now (Taylor's Version) – vocal engineering

== Grammy awards and nominations ==
Accolades for Taylor York
Year	Category	Work	Result
2010	Best Song Written for a Motion Picture, Television or Other Visual Media	"Decode"; Shared with Josh Farro & Hayley Williams	Nominated
2011	Best Pop Performance by a Duo or Group with Vocals	"The Only Exception"; Shared with Josh Farro & Hayley Williams	Nominated
2015	Best Rock Song	"Ain't It Fun"; Shared with Hayley Williams	Won
2024	Best Rock Album	This is Why; Shared with Zac Farro & Hayley Williams, Tam Harriet & Manny Marroquin, and Carlos de la Garza	Won
2024	Best Alternative Music Performance	"This is Why"; Shared with Zac Farro & Hayley Williams	Won
