= After Laughter Tour =

2017–18 concert tour by Paramore

- Tour by Paramore
- Associated album: After Laughter
- Start date: June 15, 2017
- End date: September 7, 2018
- Legs: 5
- No. of shows: 100

Paramore concert chronology
- The Self-Titled Tour (2013–15); After Laughter Tour (2017–18); This Is Why Tour (2022–23)

The After Laughter Tour was the fourth world tour by American rock band Paramore, in support of their fifth studio album After Laughter (2017). The tour began on June 15, 2017, in Dublin, Ireland, and concluded on September 7, 2018, in Nashville, Tennessee; comprising one hundred dates.

This was the first touring cycle since 2010 to feature drummer Zac Farro, who left the band on December 18, 2010, and rejoined on February 2, 2017.

== Background ==
On April 19, 2017 Paramore released "Hard Times" as the lead single from their fifth studio album, After Laughter, and on the same day announced European tour dates. On May 3, 2017 the band released "Told You So as a single in the UK, acting as the second single from their fifth studio album. The full release of the album followed on May 12, 2017. The same day they also announced the 3rd Parahoy! Cruise, and on May 15, 2017 they announced North American tour dates. On November 17, 2017 the band released "Fake Happy" as their third single off After Laughter. On February 5, 2018 the band released their fourth single off After Laughter, "Rose-Colored Boy." And finally, on June 26, 2018, Paramore released their fifth and final single off the album, "Caught in the Middle.

The first set of tour dates were announced as "Tour One" on April 19, 2017, with the band touring intimate venues in Europe. Parahoy! Cruise was announced on May 12, 2017, coinciding with the release of After Laughter. The second set of tour dates were announced as "Tour Two" on May 15, 2017, touring intimate venues in North America. Due to Hurricane Irma, the band had to reschedule the Orlando and Miami dates for December 5 and 6, 2017. The third set of tour dates were announced as "Tour Three" on August 25, 2017, touring arenas in Europe. The fourth set of tour dates were announced as "Tour Four" on November 7, 2017, touring arenas in Oceania, Asia, and Hawaii. Due to Williams getting sick, the Jakarta and Manila dates were rescheduled. The fifth and final set of tour dates were announced on March 8, 2018 as "Tour Five" and was officially called The After Laughter Summer Tour with Foster The People.

The band announced the final show of the After Laughter era on June 26, 2018. The show is called Art + Friends, and happened in Nashville, Tennessee on September 7, 2018. The band have described it as "a celebration of Nashville music, art and community." Paramore performed a headline show, with support from bands COIN, Bully, Nightingail, and artists Liza Anne and Canon Blue.

== Critical reception ==
A review of the Mountain View performance stated: "From Williams encouraging the unity of fans in her speeches to the whole band exuding raw emotion in its performance, the band has truly mastered the art of audience connection."

== Set list ==
Europe (2017)
1. "Told You So"
2. "That's What You Get"
3. "Brick by Boring Brick"
4. "Still Into You"
5. "Caught in the Middle"
6. "Turn It Off"
7. "Decode"
8. "I Caught Myself"
9. "Hate to See Your Heart Break"
10. "Fake Happy"
11. "Everywhere"
12. "Rose-Colored Boy"
13. "Playing God"
14. "Ain't It Fun"
15. "Misery Business"
16. "Hard Times"
  Encore
17. "Forgiveness"
18. "Scooby's in the Back"
The Americas (2017)
1. "Hard Times"
2. "Ignorance"
3. "Still Into You"
4. "Daydreaming"
5. "Brick by Boring Brick"
6. "Forgiveness"
7. "That's What You Get"
8. "Playing God"
9. "I Caught Myself"
10. "Hate to See Your Heart Break"
11. "Told You So"
12. "Fake Happy"
13. "Everywhere"
14. "Misery Business"
15. "Caught in the Middle"
16. "Ain't It Fun"
  Encore
17. "Rose-Colored Boy"
18. "Scooby's in the Back"
Europe (2018)
1. "Hard Times"
2. "Ignorance"
3. "Still Into You"
4. "Forgiveness"
5. "Fake Happy"
6. "That's What You Get"
7. "I Caught Myself"
8. "Pool"
9. "Hate to See Your Heart Break"
10. "Caught in the Middle"
11. "Told You So"
12. "Idle Worship"
13. "No Friend"
14. "Misery Business"
15. "Ain't It Fun"
  Encore
16. "Grow Up"
17. "French Class"
18. "Rose-Colored Boy"
Asia-Pacific (2018)
1. "Hard Times"
2. "Grudges"
3. "Still Into You"
4. "Ignorance"
5. "That's What You Get"
6. "Forgiveness"
7. "Fake Happy"
8. "I Caught Myself"
9. "Pool"
10. "Hate to See Your Heart Break"
11. "Caught in the Middle"
12. "Idle Worship"
13. "Told You So"
14. "No Friend"
15. "Misery Business"
16. "Ain't It Fun"
  Encore
17. "Rose-Colored Boy"
18. "Grow Up"
19. "French Class"
North America (2018)
1. "Grudges"
2. "Still Into You"
3. "Rose-Colored Boy"
4. "That's What You Get"
5. "Crushcrushcrush"
6. "Fake Happy"
7. "Forgiveness"
8. "Ignorance"
9. "Pool"
10. "Passionfruit"
11. "Misguided Ghosts"
12. "26"
13. "Caught in the Middle"
14. "Idle Worship"
15. "No Friend"
16. "Misery Business"
17. "Ain't It Fun"
  Encore
18. "Told You So"
19. "All That Is Love"
20. "Hard Times"

== Tour dates ==
List of 2017 concerts
| Date (2017) | City | Country | Venue | Opening act |
|---|---|---|---|---|
| June 15 | Dublin | Ireland | Olympia Theatre | Bleached |
| June 16 | Belfast | United Kingdom | Waterfront Hall | Bleached |
| June 18 | Manchester | United Kingdom | O2 Apollo Manchester | Bleached |
| June 19 | London | United Kingdom | Royal Albert Hall | Bleached |
| June 21 | Bristol | United Kingdom | Colston Hall | Bleached |
| June 22 | Edinburgh | United Kingdom | Usher Hall | Bleached |
| June 24 | Cologne | Germany | Palladium | Bleached |
| June 25 | Tilburg | Netherlands | 013 | Bleached |
| June 27 | Paris | France | Le Grand Rex | Bleached |
| June 29 | Vienna | Austria | Arena Wien | Bleached |
| June 30 (Note: Part of Volt Fesztivál.) | Sopron | Hungary | Lővér Kemping | —N/a |
| July 2 | Berlin | Germany | Admiralspalast | Bleached |
| July 3 (Note: Part of Stadpark Open Air.) | Hamburg | Germany | Stadtpark | —N/a |
| July 5 (Note: Part of Rock for People.) | Hradec Králové | Czech Republic | Hradec Králové Airport | —N/a |
| July 7 | Stockholm | Sweden | Cirkus | Bleached |
| July 9 (Note: Part of Ruisrock.) | Turku | Finland | Ruissalo | —N/a |
| July 12 | Copenhagen | Denmark | Vega | Bleached |
| July 14 (Note: Part of Slottsfjell Festival.) | Tønsberg | Norway | Slottsfjell | —N/a |
| July 28 | Hinckley | United States | Grand Casino Amphitheater | —N/a |
| July 29 (Note: Part of North Dakota State Fair.) | Minot | United States | North Dakota State Fairgrounds | —N/a |
| August 12 | Billings | United States | Rimrock Auto Arena | —N/a |
| August 14 (Note: Part of Iowa State Fair.) | Des Moines | United States | Iowa State Fairgrounds | —N/a |
| September 6 | Jacksonville | United States | Moran Theater | Flor |
| September 11 | Charlotte | United States | Ovens Auditorium | Best Coast |
| September 13 | Oxon Hill (Note: Billed as Washington, D.C.) | United States | The Theater at MGM National Harbor | Best Coast |
| September 15 | Detroit | United States | Fox Theatre | Best Coast |
| September 17 (Note: Part of Riot Fest.) | Chicago | United States | Douglass Park | —N/a |
| September 19 | Sioux City | United States | Orpheum Theater | Best Coast |
| September 21 | Denver | United States | Bellco Theatre | Best Coast |
| September 22 | Orem | United States | UCCU Center | Best Coast |
| September 24 | Oakland | United States | Paramount Theatre | Best Coast |
| September 26 | Los Angeles | United States | Greek Theatre | Best Coast |
| September 27 | Phoenix | United States | Comerica Theatre | Best Coast |
| September 29 | Sugar Land (Note: Billed as Houston.) | United States | Smart Financial Centre | Best Coast |
| September 30 | Grand Prairie (Note: Billed as Dallas.) | United States | Verizon Theatre | Best Coast |
| October 2 | Atlanta | United States | Fox Theatre | Best Coast |
| October 4 | New York City | United States | Radio City Music Hall | Best Coast |
| October 6 | Upper Darby | United States | Tower Theatre | Best Coast |
| October 7 | Boston | United States | Boston Opera House | Best Coast |
| October 10 | Bethlehem | United States | Sands Bethlehem Event Center | Best Coast |
| October 12 | Montreal | Canada | Théâtre Saint-Denis | Best Coast |
| October 13 | Toronto | Canada | Massey Hall | Best Coast |
| October 15 | Akron | United States | Akron Civic Theatre | Best Coast |
| October 17 | Nashville | United States | Ryman Auditorium | Best Coast |
| October 20 (Note: Part of Festival Coordenada.) | Guadalajara | Mexico | Parque Trasloma | —N/a |
| October 21 (Note: Part of Live Out Monterrey.) | Monterrey | Mexico | Parque Fundidora | —N/a |
| October 23 | Mexico City | Mexico | Palacio de los Deportes | PVRIS |
| November 11 (Note: Part of Personal Fest.) | Buenos Aires | Argentina | Club Ciudad de Buenos Aires | —N/a |
| December 1 (Note: Part of FM102.1 Big Snow Show 2017.) | Milwaukee | United States | Eagles Ballroom | —N/a |
| December 3 (Note: Part of 97X Next Big Thing.) | Tampa | United States | MidFlorida Credit Union Amphitheatre | —N/a |
| December 5 (Note: Rescheduled from September 9, 2018, due to Hurricane Irma.) | Orlando | United States | Walt Disney Theater | Flor |
| December 6 (Note: Rescheduled from September 8, 2018, due to Hurricane Irma.) | Miami Beach (Note: Billed as Miami.) | United States | The Fillmore Miami Beach | Flor |
| December 8 (Note: Part of 96X Winter Meltdown.) | Norfolk | United States | Constant Convocation Center | —N/a |

List of 2018 concerts
| Date (2018) | City | Country | Venue | Opening act |
|---|---|---|---|---|
| January 7 | Barcelona | Spain | Sant Jordi Club | mewithoutYou |
| January 9 | Paris | France | Olympia | mewithoutYou |
| January 11 | Cardiff | United Kingdom | Motorpoint Arena Cardiff | mewithoutYou |
| January 12 | London | United Kingdom | The O_{2} Arena | mewithoutYou |
| January 14 | Birmingham | United Kingdom | Genting Arena | mewithoutYou |
| January 16 | Amsterdam | Netherlands | AFAS Live | mewithoutYou |
| January 19 | Manchester | United Kingdom | Manchester Arena | mewithoutYou |
| January 20 | Glasgow | United Kingdom | The SSE Hydro | mewithoutYou |
| February 8 | Melbourne | Australia | Rod Laver Arena | Bleachers |
| February 9 | Sydney | Australia | Qudos Bank Arena | Bleachers |
| February 11 | Brisbane | Australia | Riverstage | Bleachers |
| February 13 | Auckland | New Zealand | Spark Arena | Bleachers |
| February 21 | Tokyo | Japan | Zepp Tokyo | Bleachers |
| February 23 | Honolulu | United States | Neal S. Blaisdell Concert Hall | Bleachers |
| June 8 (Note: Part of Bonnaroo.) | Manchester | United States | Great Stage Park | —N/a |
| June 12 | St. Augustine | United States | St. Augustine Amphitheatre | Foster the People; Soccer Mommy |
| June 14 | Simpsonville | United States | Heritage Park Amphitheatre | Foster the People; Soccer Mommy |
| June 15 | Raleigh | United States | Red Hat Amphitheater | Foster the People; Soccer Mommy |
| June 17 | Syracuse | United States | St. Joseph's Amphitheater at Lakeview | Foster the People; Soccer Mommy |
| June 18 | Toronto | Canada | Budweiser Stage | Foster the People; Soccer Mommy |
| June 20 | Gilford | United States | Bank of New Hampshire Pavilion | Foster the People; Soccer Mommy |
| June 21 | Bangor | United States | Darling's Waterfront Pavilion | Foster the People; Soccer Mommy |
| June 23 | Columbia | United States | Merriweather Post Pavilion | Foster the People; Soccer Mommy |
| June 24 | Philadelphia | United States | Festival Pier | Foster the People; Soccer Mommy |
| June 26 | Brooklyn | United States | Barclays Center | Foster the People; Soccer Mommy |
| June 28 | Columbus | United States | Express Live! | Foster the People; Soccer Mommy |
| June 29 | Clarkston (Note: Billed as Detroit.) | United States | DTE Energy Music Theatre | Foster the People; Soccer Mommy |
| July 1 | Indianapolis | United States | Farm Bureau Insurance Lawn | Foster the People; Soccer Mommy |
| July 2 | Chicago | United States | Huntington Bank Pavilion | Foster the People; Jay Som |
| July 5 | Minneapolis | United States | The Armory | Foster the People; Jay Som |
| July 7 | Kansas City | United States | Starlight Theatre | Foster the People; Jay Som |
| July 8 | Oklahoma City | United States | Zoo Amphitheatre | Foster the People; Jay Som |
| July 10 | New Orleans | United States | Bold Sphere Music | Foster the People; Jay Som |
| July 11 | Corpus Christi | United States | Concrete Street Amphitheater | Foster the People; Jay Som |
| July 13 | The Woodlands (Note: Billed as Houston.) | United States | Cynthia Woods Mitchell Pavilion | Foster the People; Jay Som |
| July 14 | Irving | United States | Toyota Music Factory | Foster the People; Jay Som |
| July 18 | Inglewood (Note: Billed as Los Angeles.) | United States | The Forum | Foster the People; Jay Som |
| July 19 | Chula Vista (Note: Billed as San Diego.) | United States | Mattress Firm Amphitheatre | Foster the People; Jay Som |
| July 21 | Mountain View | United States | Shoreline Amphitheatre | Foster the People; Jay Som |
| July 23 | West Valley City (Note: Billed as Salt Lake City.) | United States | USANA Amphitheatre | Foster the People; Jay Som |
| July 24 | Morrison | United States | Red Rocks Amphitheatre | Foster the People; Jay Som |
| August 18 (Note: Part of Summer Sonic.) | Osaka | Japan | Maishima | —N/a |
| August 19 | Chiba | Japan | Makuhari Messe | —N/a |
| August 21 | Singapore | | Zepp@BIGBOX | —N/a |
| August 23 (Note: Rescheduled from February 16, 2018, due to illness.) | Pasay (Note: Billed as Manila.) | Philippines | Mall of Asia Arena | —N/a |
| August 25 (Note: Rescheduled from February 18, 2018, due to illness.) | Jakarta | Indonesia | Indonesia Convention Exhibition | —N/a |
| September 7 (Note: Part of Art + Friends.) | Nashville | United States | Nashville Municipal Auditorium | Nightingail; Liza Anne; Canon Blue; Bully; COIN |
