= This Is Why Tour =

2022–23 concert tour by Paramore

- World tour by Paramore
- Promotional poster for the 2023 North American leg
- Location: Europe; North America; Oceania; South America
- Associated album: This Is Why
- Start date: March 2, 2023
- End date: November 30, 2023
- Legs: 4
- No. of shows: 49
- Supporting acts: Bloc Party; Rozi Plain; Foals; The Linda Lindas; Genesis Owusu; Remi Wolf

Paramore concert chronology
- After Laughter Tour (2017–18); This Is Why Tour (2023)

The This Is Why Tour was the fifth concert tour by American rock band Paramore, in support of their sixth studio album This Is Why (2023). The tour began on March 2, 2023, in Lima, Peru, and concluded on November 30, 2023, in Melbourne, Australia; comprising 49 dates. Elke, Bloc Party, Rozi Plain, Foals, The Linda Lindas, Genesis Owusu and Remi Wolf served as supporting acts on the tour.

== Background and development ==
In May 2017, Paramore released their fifth studio album After Laughter to critical acclaim. The album saw the return of former drummer Zac Farro, who had left the band in 2010. The band toured in support of the album from June 2017 until September 2018. Following the conclusion of the After Laughter Tour, the members of Paramore took a break from writing and recording music for the band and worked on other endeavors. Hayley Williams featured on the American Football song "Uncomfortably Numb" in 2019 and released two solo albums, Petals for Armor (2020) and Flowers for Vases / Descansos (2021); the former produced by Paramore guitarist Taylor York. She also pivoted her attention more towards her hair dye company Good Dye Young and hosted the weekly BBC Sounds series Everything Is Emo. Farro continued his ongoing project HalfNoise, releasing an extended play – Flowerss (2018) – and two albums – Natural Disguise (2019) and Motif (2021). Farro also recorded drums for the songs "Watch Me While I Bloom" and "Crystal Clear" from Williams' Petals for Armor and released an EP under his own name titled Zafari (2020).

Discussion about a sixth Paramore album began in 2020 while Williams was promoting Petals for Armor. Williams hinted that the band's next album would be more guitar-driven, stating, "We've found ourselves listening to a lot of older music that we grew up being inspired by." She further commented on the sound of the album in 2022, likening it to Bloc Party: “From day one, Bloc Party was the number one reference because there was such an urgency to their sound that was different to the fast punk or the pop punk or the like, loud wall of sound emo bands that were happening in the early 2000s.” In January 2022, the band confirmed they had entered the studio work on their sixth album.

In September 2022, Paramore archived all posts on their official Instagram page and unveiled a new design for the website. The site featured a timeline of several dates throughout the month that would be updated each date. These dates saw the launch of the band's official Discord server, the announcement of new tour dates in Los Angeles and New York City, and video snippets of the band working on new material. On September 16, the band announced their first new single in four years, "This Is Why", which was released on September 28. The same day as the single's release, the band announced the album of the same name to be released on February 10, 2023.

Following the release of "This Is Why", Paramore promoted the upcoming album with theater performances across the United States and headlining slots at the Austin City Limits and When We Were Young festivals. On October 10, 2022, the band announced they would go on tour, starting in March 2023, with shows in South America and Europe. A month later, Paramore announced a North American leg, supported by various acts such as Bloc Party, Foals, The Linda Lindas and Genesis Owusu. An Oceanic leg was announced on June 26, 2023.

== Critical reception ==
Rolling Stone's Brittany Spanos gave the tour a positive review, saying it "proved that the best is yet to come" for the band.

== Set list ==
South America
1. "You First"
2. "Playing God"
3. "Decode"
4. "Pool"
5. "Running Out of Time"
6. "Rose-Colored Boy" (contains elements of "I Wanna Dance With Somebody (Who Loves Me)" by Whitney Houston and "Genius of Love" by Tom Tom Club)
7. "Told You So"
8. "C'est Comme Ça"
9. "I Caught Myself"
10. "The Only Exception"
11. "(One of Those) Crazy Girls"
12. "The News"
13. "That's What You Get"
14. "Scooby's in the Back" (HalfNoise song)
15. "Hard Times" (contains elements of "Heart of Glass" by Blondie)
16. "Ain't It Fun"
17. "All I Wanted"
  Encore
18. "Still Into You"
19. "Misery Business"
20. "This Is Why"
Europe
1. "You First"
2. "The News"
3. "Playing God"
4. "That's What You Get"
5. "Running Out of Time"
6. "Hard Times" (contains elements of "Born Under Punches (The Heat Goes On)" and "Heart of Glass")
7. "Caught in the Middle"
8. "Ain't It Fun"
9. "Liar"
10. "Crystal Clear"
11. "Decode"
12. "Still Into You"
13. "Rose-Colored Boy" (contains elements of "I Wanna Dance With Somebody (Who Loves Me)]]" and "Genius of Love")
14. "Baby"
15. "Last Hope"
16. "I Caught Myself"
17. "All I Wanted"
18. "Misery Business"
19. "Crave"
  Encore
20. "The Only Exception"
21. "This Is Why"
North America
1. "You First"
2. "The News"
3. "That's What You Get"
4. "Playing God"
5. "Caught in the Middle"
6. "Rose-Colored Boy" (contains elements of "I Wanna Dance With Somebody (Who Loves Me)" and "Genius of Love")
7. "Running Out of Time"
8. "Decode"
9. "Last Hope"
10. "Big Man, Little Dignity"
11. "Liar"
12. "Crystal Clear"
13. "Hard Times" (contains elements of "Born Under Punches (The Heat Goes On)" and "Heart of Glass")
14. "Told You So"
15. "Figure 8"
16. "The Only Exception"
17. "Baby"
18. "Crave"
19. "Misery Business"
20. "Ain't It Fun"
  Encore
21. "Still Into You"
22. "This Is Why"
Oceania
1. "You First"
2. "The News"
3. "That's What You Get"
4. "Playing God"
5. "Caught in the Middle"
6. "Rose-Colored Boy" (contains elements of "I Wanna Dance With Somebody (Who Loves Me)" and "Genius of Love")
7. "Running Out of Time"
8. "Decode"
9. "Last Hope"
10. "Thick Skull"
11. "Hard Times" (contains elements of "Born Under Punches (The Heat Goes On)" and "Heart of Glass")
12. "Crystal Clear"
13. "Figure 8"
14. "The Only Exception"
15. "Crave"
16. "Baby"
17. "Misery Business"
18. "Ain't It Fun"
  Encore
19. "Still Into You"
20. "This Is Why"
Notes
- "Caught in the Middle" was added to the set list on March 5.
- During the concert in Bogotá, elements of Shakira's "She Wolf" were incorporated into the performed of "Told You So".
- Starting on April 13, elements of "Born Under Punches (The Heat Goes On)" by Talking Heads were incorporated in the performance of "Hard Times".
- During the concert in Dublin, Hayley Williams covered "Dreams" by Fleetwood Mac.
- During the concert in Cardiff, Williams covered "what can you say" by Adrianne Lenker.
- During the concert in Glasgow, Williams covered "Rip It Up" by Orange Juice.
- "Misguided Ghosts" was performed in Manchester.
- "26" was performed in Birmingham.
- During the second London concert, Paramore was joined onstage by Kele Okereke to perform "Blue Light".
- During the second New York City concert, Paramore was joined onstage by Lil Uzi Vert to perform "Misery Business".
- During the encore of the first Inglewood concert, Paramore was joined onstage by Billie Eilish to perform "All I Wanted".
- During the second Inglewood concert, Paramore was joined onstage by Bethany Cosentino and Rico Nasty to perform "Big Man, Little Dignity" and "Misery Business", respectively.
- "Told You So" was cut from the set list on July 29.

== Shows ==
List of 2023 concerts
Date (2023)	City	Country	Venue	Opening act(s)	Attendance	Gross
March 2	Lima	Peru	Estadio Universidad San Marcos	Elke	21,116 / 24,499	$1,692,474
March 5	Santiago	Chile	Movistar Arena	Elke	16,594 / 16,594	$1,212,960
March 7	Buenos Aires	Argentina	Movistar Arena	Elke	10,483 / 12,305	$701,095
March 9	Rio de Janeiro	Brazil	Qualistage	Elke	8,101 / 8,101	$591,702
March 11	São Paulo	Brazil	Centro Esportivo Tiete	Elke	36,132 / 36,132	$2,894,867
March 12	São Paulo	Brazil	Centro Esportivo Tiete	Elke	36,132 / 36,132	$2,894,867
March 14	Bogotá	Colombia	Movistar Arena	Elke	12,315 / 12,315	$653,919
April 13	Dublin	Ireland	3Arena	Bloc Party; Rozi Plain	12,605 / 12,605	$958,486
April 15	Cardiff	Wales	Cardiff International Arena	Bloc Party; Rozi Plain	7,395 / 7,395	$569,605
April 17	Glasgow	Scotland	OVO Hydro	Bloc Party; Rozi Plain	14,008 / 14,008	$995,304
April 18	Manchester	England	AO Arena	Bloc Party; Rozi Plain	15,316 / 15,316	$1,183,157
April 20	London	England	The O_{2} Arena	Bloc Party; Rozi Plain	36,000 / 36,000 (Note: The box office data is representative of the two shows at O2 Arena on 20 and 23 April respectively.)	$3,092,265 (Note: The box office data is representative of the two shows at O2 Arena on 20 and 23 April respectively.)
April 22	Birmingham	England	Utilita Arena	Bloc Party; Rozi Plain	14,911 / 14,911	$1,181,520
April 23	London	England	The O_{2} Arena	Bloc Party; Rozi Plain	(Note: The box office data is representative of the two shows at O2 Arena on 20 and 23 April respectively.)	(Note: The box office data is representative of the two shows at O2 Arena on 20 and 23 April respectively.)
May 20 (Note: The concert on May 20, 2023 at the East Beach Boulevard in Gulf Shores is a part of Hangout Music Festival.)	Gulf Shores	United States	Hangout Music Festival	—N/a	—N/a	—N/a
May 23	Charlotte	United States	Spectrum Center	Bloc Party; Genesis Owusu	14,679 / 14,679	$1,254,202
May 25	Atlanta	United States	State Farm Arena	Bloc Party; Genesis Owusu	11,630 / 11,630	$1,133,447
May 27 (Note: The concert on May 27, 2023 at the Atlantic City Beach in Atlantic City is a part of Adjacent Festival.)	Atlantic City	United States	Atlantic City Beach	—N/a	—N/a	—N/a
May 28 (Note: The concert on May 28, 2023 at the Harvard Stadium in Boston is a part of Boston Calling Music Festival.)	Boston	United States	Harvard Stadium	—N/a	—N/a	—N/a
May 30	New York City	United States	Madison Square Garden	Bloc Party; Genesis Owusu	27,616 / 27,616	$3,102,129
May 31	New York City	United States	Madison Square Garden	Bloc Party; Genesis Owusu	27,616 / 27,616	$3,102,129
June 2	Washington, D.C.	United States	Capital One Arena	Bloc Party; Genesis Owusu	13,947 / 13,947	$1,448,355
June 4	Cleveland	United States	Rocket Mortgage FieldHouse	Bloc Party; Genesis Owusu	10,888 / 10,888	$1,013,784
June 5	Indianapolis	United States	Gainbridge Fieldhouse	Bloc Party; Genesis Owusu	12,006 / 12,006	$981,558
June 7	Detroit	United States	Little Caesars Arena	Bloc Party; Genesis Owusu	13,306 / 13,306	$1,290,946
June 8	Toronto	Canada	Scotiabank Arena	Bloc Party; Genesis Owusu	14,500 / 14,500	$1,078,432
June 10	Columbus	United States	Schottenstein Center	Bloc Party; Genesis Owusu	13,185 / 13,185	$1,096,590
June 11	Pittsburgh	United States	PPG Paints Arena	Bloc Party; Genesis Owusu	13,498 / 13,498	$1,136,748
June 13	Orlando	United States	Amway Center	Bloc Party; Genesis Owusu	13,512 / 13,512	$1,297,118
June 14	Hollywood	United States	Hard Rock Live	Bloc Party; Genesis Owusu	6,705 / 6,705	$745,957
June 18 (Note: The concert on June 18, 2023 at the Great Stage Park in Manchester is a part of Bonnaroo Music & Arts Festival.)	Manchester	United States	Great Stage Park	—N/a	—N/a	—N/a
July 6	New Orleans	United States	Smoothie King Center	Foals; The Linda Lindas	12,618 / 12,618	$994,103
July 8	Fort Worth	United States	Dickies Arena	Foals; The Linda Lindas	11,165 / 11,165	$1,160,869
July 9	Austin	United States	Moody Center	Foals; The Linda Lindas	12,262 / 12,262	$1,297,850
July 11	Houston	United States	Toyota Center	Foals; The Linda Lindas	12,234 / 12,234	$1,155,830
July 13	Denver	United States	Ball Arena	Foals; The Linda Lindas	13,324 / 13,324	$1,316,045
July 15	Thousand Palms	United States	Acrisure Arena	Foals; The Linda Lindas	9,954 / 9,954	$1,133,420
July 16	San Diego	United States	Viejas Arena	Foals; The Linda Lindas	9,447 / 9,447	$1,174,914
July 19	Inglewood (Note: Billed as Los Angeles.)	United States	Kia Forum	Foals; The Linda Lindas	28,968 / 28,968	$3,345,439
July 20	Inglewood	United States	Kia Forum	Foals; The Linda Lindas	28,968 / 28,968	$3,345,439
July 29	Tulsa	United States	BOK Center	Foals; The Linda Lindas	12,003 / 12,003	$1,021,371
July 30	St. Louis	United States	Enterprise Center	Foals; The Linda Lindas	12,993 / 12,993	$1,128,722
August 1	Milwaukee	United States	Fiserv Forum	Foals; The Linda Lindas	11,914 / 11,914	$1,073,453
August 2	Saint Paul	United States	Xcel Energy Center	Foals; The Linda Lindas	14,090 / 14,090	$1,125,035
August 7 (Note: Rescheduled from July 22, due to illness.)	San Francisco	United States	Chase Center	Foals; The Linda Lindas	13,651 / 13,651	$1,485,423
August 9 (Note: Rescheduled from July 24, due to illness.)	Seattle	United States	Climate Pledge Arena	Foals; The Linda Lindas	14,707 / 14,707	$1,468,932
November 18	Auckland	New Zealand	Spark Arena	Remi Wolf	10,309 / 10,745	$779,999
November 22	Brisbane	Australia	Brisbane Entertainment Center	Remi Wolf	22,148 / 22,148	$1,856,876
November 23	Brisbane	Australia	Brisbane Entertainment Center	Remi Wolf	22,148 / 22,148	$1,856,876
November 25	Sydney	Australia	The Domain	Remi Wolf	26,283 / 26,283	$2,243,828
November 27	Melbourne	Australia	Rod Laver Arena	Remi Wolf	41,079 / 41,079	$3,717,120
November 28	Melbourne	Australia	Rod Laver Arena	Remi Wolf	41,079 / 41,079	$3,717,120
November 30	Melbourne	Australia	Rod Laver Arena	Remi Wolf	41,079 / 41,079	$3,717,120
Total					654,586 / 660,227 (100%)	$58,785,849

=== Cancelled shows ===
List of cancelled concerts
Date	City	Country	Venue	Reason
August 10, 2023 (Note: Originally July 25, 2023.)	Portland	United States	Veterans Memorial Coliseum	Illness
August 13, 2023 (Note: Originally July 27, 2023.)	Salt Lake City	United States	Delta Center	Illness
January 13, 2024 (Note: Part of IHeart Radio's Alter Ego Fest)	Anaheim	United States	Honda Center	Unforeseen circumstances
March 17, 2024 (Note: Part of Vive Latino.)	Mexico City	Mexico	Autódromo Hermanos Rodríguez	Unforeseen circumstances
March 21, 2024 (Note: Intended to be part of Festival Estéreo Picnic.)	Bogotá	Colombia	Simón Bolívar Park	Unforeseen circumstances
March 24, 2024 (Note: Intended to be part of Lollapalooza.)	São Paulo	Brazil	Autódromo de Interlagos	Unforeseen circumstances
