= Caught in the Middle =

Caught in the Middle may refer to:

- Caught in the Middle (album), by Linear
- "Caught in the Middle" (A1 song), 2002
- "Caught in the Middle" (Anastacia song), 2017
- "Caught in the Middle" (Paramore song), 2018
- "Caught in the Middle" (Juliet Roberts song), 1993
- "Caught in the Middle", by Dio from the 1983 album Holy Diver
- "Caught in the Middle", by Charli XCX from the 2014 album Sucker
- "Caught in the Middle" (Doctors), a 2003 television episode

== See also ==
- Stuck in the Middle (disambiguation)
- In the Middle (disambiguation)
