= Caught (disambiguation) =

Caught is a method of dismissing a batsman in the sport of cricket.

Caught may also refer to:

== Books ==
- Caught (Margaret Peterson Haddix novel), a novel by Margaret Peterson Haddix
- Caught (Coben novel), a 2010 novel by Harlan Coben

== Films ==
- Caught (1931 film), a 1931 American Pre-Code Western film
- Caught (1949 film), an American drama film
- Caught (1996 film), an erotic thriller film
- Caught (2015 film), an American psychological thriller film

== Television ==
- Caught (2018 TV series), a 2018 Canadian crime drama television series
- Caught (2023 TV series), a 2023 Australian comedy television series
- Caught!, a 2023 American television series produced by Warner Bros. Discovery
- Caught (2025 TV series), an Argentine television series
- "Caught" (Band of Gold), a 1995 television episode
- "Caught!", the fifth episode of The Bronx Is Burning

== Music ==
- Caught (album), a 1980 album by Teri DeSario
- "Caught", a 1988 song by Pseudo Echo from the album Race
- "Caught", a 2015 song by Florence + the Machine from the album How Big, How Blue, How Beautiful

== See also ==
- Catch (disambiguation)
- Catching (disambiguation)
- Caught in the Middle (disambiguation)
