= Catch =

Catch may refer to:

== In sports ==
- Catch (game), children's game
- Catch (baseball), a maneuver in baseball
- Catch (cricket), a mode of dismissal in cricket
- Catch or reception (gridiron football)
- Catch, a product of fishing
- Catch, part of a rowing stroke
- Catch wrestling, a combat sport
- Catch, anglicism for professional wrestling in many non-Anglophone European countries

== In music ==
- Catch (music), a form of round
- Catch (band), an English band
- C. C. Catch (born 1964), Dutch-born German pop singer

=== Albums ===
- Catch, 1969 self titled album by Catch
- Catch, 2006 album by Misako Odani
- Catch!, an album by Tsuji Shion
- Catch, a 2002 electronic album by Kosheen

=== Songs ===
- "Catch" (The Cure song), 1987
- "Catch" (Kosheen song), 2000
- "Catch" (Allie X song)
- "Catch" (Brett Young song), 2019

== Other uses ==
- Catch (brand), a food and beverage brand
- Catch or latch, a device to close a door or window
- catch, a computer-language command in exception handling syntax
- Catch, an Indian web news magazine owned by Rajasthan Patrika
- Catch, a ship of the Third Supply fleet to Virginia colony in 1609

== See also ==
- Caught (disambiguation)
- The Catch (disambiguation)
- Catch and release
- Catch-22 (disambiguation)
- Catcha Group, a Malaysian company
- Catching (disambiguation)
