= Paramore =

American rock band

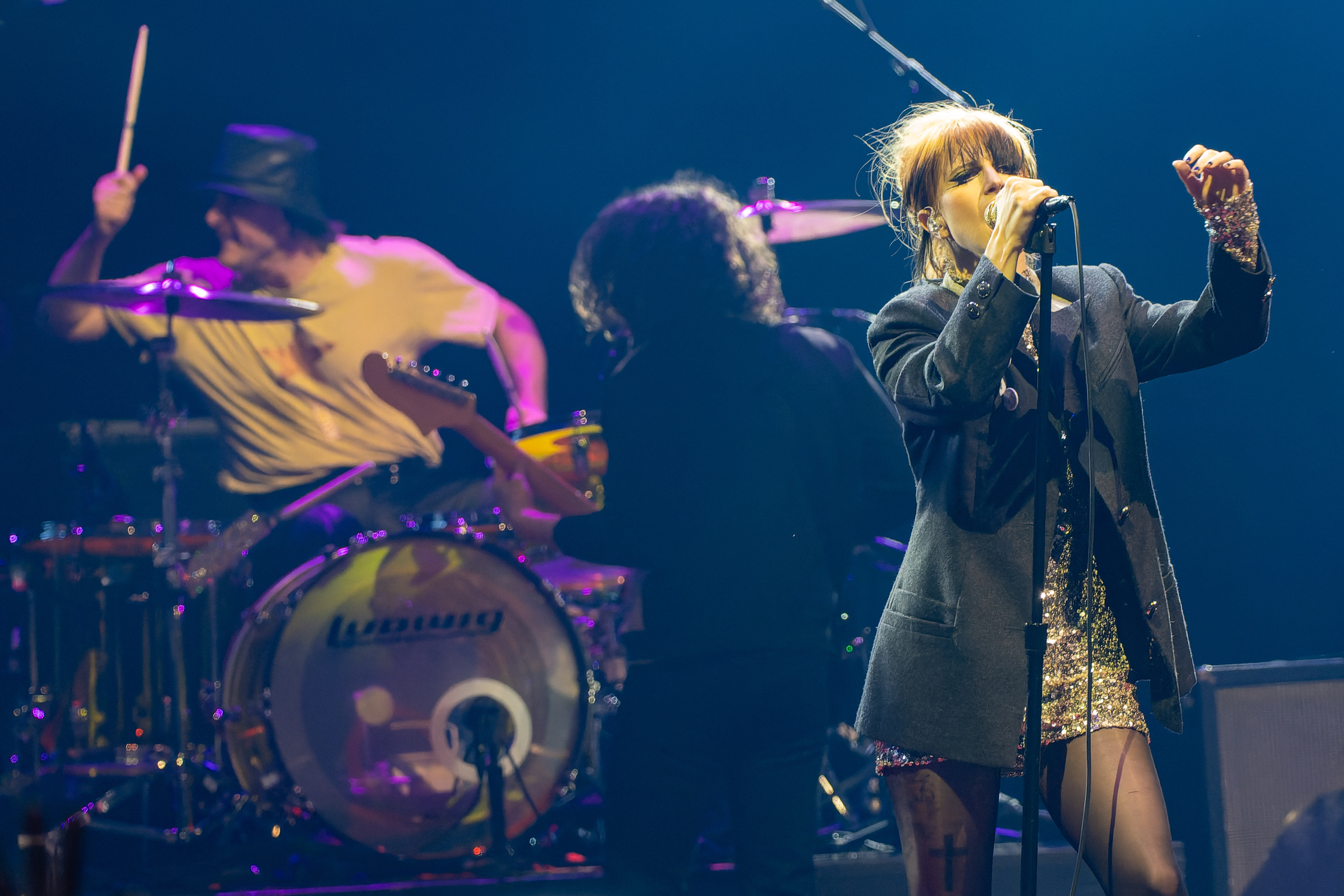
- Paramore performing in London in 2023. From left to right: Zac Farro, Taylor York, and Hayley Williams.

Background information
- Origin: Franklin, Tennessee, U.S.
- Genres: Pop-punk; emo; pop rock; alternative rock; new wave
- Works: Discography; songs
- Years active: 2004–present (Note: The band has been on hiatus since September 2025.)
- Labels: Fueled by Ramen; Atlantic
- Spinoffs: HalfNoise; Novel American; Farro; Power Snatch
- Members: Hayley Williams; Zac Farro; Taylor York
- Past members: Jeremy Davis; Josh Farro; Jason Bynum; John Hembree; Hunter Lamb
- Website: paramore.net
- Logo

Paramore is an American rock band formed in Franklin, Tennessee, in 2004. Since 2017, the band's lineup has included lead vocalist Hayley Williams, guitarist Taylor York, and drummer Zac Farro. Williams and Farro are the founding members of the group, while York, a high school friend of the original lineup, joined in 2007.

The band was signed to Fueled by Ramen, a subsidiary of Atlantic Records. Williams was signed to Atlantic separately, as she was scouted when she was a teenager. They were the only label to let her stay in the band instead of going solo, but Atlantic said the rest of the band had to sign to Fueled by Ramen. The group's debut album, All We Know Is Falling (2005), reached number 30 on Billboard's Heatseekers Chart in 2006 and number four on the UK Rock Chart in 2009.

The band's second album, Riot! (2007) became a mainstream success thanks to the success of the singles "Misery Business", "Crushcrushcrush", and "That's What You Get". The album was certified Platinum in the US and the band received a Best New Artist nomination at the 2008 Grammy Awards. Their 2009 follow-up, Brand New Eyes, reached number two on the Billboard 200 and became the band's second-highest-charting album to date. It produced the top-forty single "The Only Exception" and went platinum in Ireland and the UK.

Following the departure of Zac and Josh Farro in 2010, the band released their self-titled fourth album in 2013. Paramore gave the band their first number one album on the US Billboard 200 and was also the number one album in the UK, Ireland, Australia, New Zealand, Brazil, Argentina and Mexico. It included the singles "Still Into You" and "Ain't It Fun", with the latter winning the Grammy Award for Best Rock Song for Williams and York as songwriters, making it Paramore's first Grammy win. The band's lineup changed once again after this album, with bassist Jeremy Davis leaving the band near the end of 2015 and former drummer Zac Farro rejoining the band in 2017. Their albums After Laughter (2017) and This Is Why (2023) peaked within the top-ten, the latter of which won the Grammy Award for Best Rock Album.

== History ==
=== 2002–2004: Formation and early years ===
In 2002, at age 13, vocalist Hayley Williams moved from her hometown Meridian, Mississippi, to Franklin, Tennessee, where she met brothers Josh Farro and Zac Farro at a weekly supplemental program for home-schooled students. Shortly after arriving, she began taking vocal lessons with Brett Manning. Prior to forming Paramore, Williams and bassist Jeremy Davis, along with friend Kimee Read, took part in a funk cover band called The Factory, while Josh and Zac Farro had practiced together after school. The other members of what was soon to be Paramore had been "edgy about the whole female thing" of having Williams as vocalist, but, because they were good friends, she started writing for them. Williams said of the members when she first met them, "They were the first people I met who were as passionate about music as I was."

Williams was originally signed to Atlantic Records as a solo artist in 2003. She had been introduced to Atlantic A&R Tom Storms by Kent Marcus and Jim Zumwalt, lawyers of managers Dave Steunebrink and Richard Williams, and then eventually signed to Atlantic by Jason Flom. Steunebrink and Richard had originally discovered and signed her to a production deal that was later bought out by Atlantic. The original plan of the label was to turn her into a pop singer, but Williams resisted, saying that she wanted to play alternative rock music with a band. In an interview with HitQuarters the band's A&R at Atlantic, Steve Robertson, said, "She wanted to make sure that we didn't look at her as some straight to Top 40 pop princess. She wanted to make sure that she and her band got the chance to show what they can do as a rock band writing their own songs." Label president Julie Greenwald and the label staff decided to go with her wishes. The original management team for the band was Dave Steunebrink, Creed manager Jeff Hanson, and Hanson's assistant Mark Mercado.

The band was officially formed by Josh Farro (lead guitar/backing vocals), Zac Farro (drums), Davis (bass guitar) and Williams (lead vocals) in 2004, with the later addition of Williams' neighbor Jason Bynum (rhythm guitar). When Davis showed up, he was stunned to find out the drummer was only fourteen years old. He admitted "I had very, very, very, little faith in everyone in the band because of their age. I remember thinking, 'This is not going to work because this kid is way too young,' but that first day of practice was amazing. I knew we were on to something." According to Williams, the name "Paramore" came from the maiden name of the mother of one of their first bass players. Once the group learned the meaning of the homophone paramour ('secret lover'), they decided to adopt the name, using the Paramore spelling.

Paramore was originally supposed to release their music on Atlantic Records, but the label's marketing department decided it would be better for the image of the band to not have them attached to a major label. Instead, they released their music through the niche label Fueled by Ramen. Williams was signed to Atlantic separately and the rest of the band had to sign to Fueled by Ramen. Lyor Cohen, the head of Warner Music Group, had already identified Fueled by Ramen as a label they should partner with. It was decided the rock label would make an ideal match for Paramore. According to Robertson, when the band was presented to Fueled by Ramen's CEO John Janick, "he got the vision of the band immediately." Janick went to a Taste of Chaos performance in Orlando, Florida, to see the band perform live. In April 2005, after a smaller private performance at a warehouse, the band was signed to Atlantic Records and Fueled By Ramen.

The band's first song written together was "Conspiracy", which was later used on their debut album. At this time, they were touring the Southeast, usually being driven by Williams' parents. She commented that "Back then, I guess we were all thinking, after school, we'll go to the house and practice. It was what we loved to do for fun, and still do! I don't think any of us really knew this would turn out to be what it's become."

=== 2005–2006: All We Know Is Falling ===
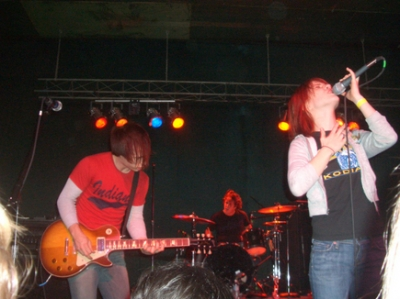
Paramore performing in Portland, Oregon, in January 2006

Paramore traveled back to Orlando, Florida, but shortly after arriving, Jeremy Davis left the band, citing personal reasons. The remaining four members of Paramore continued with the album, writing "All We Know" about his departure, and later deciding to base All We Know Is Falling around the concept. The album artwork also reflected Paramore's grief, as Hayley Williams explains, "The couch on the cover of All We Know is Falling with no one there and the shadow walking away; it's all about Jeremy leaving us and us feeling like there's an empty space."

Before touring, the band added John Hembree (bass) to their lineup to replace Davis. During that summer, Paramore was featured on the Shiragirl stage of the 2005 Warped Tour. After being asked by the band, Jeremy Davis returned to Paramore after five months apart, replacing Hembree. All We Know Is Falling was released on July 26, 2005, and reached No. 30 on Billboard's Heatseekers Chart. Paramore released "Pressure" as its first single, with a video directed by Shane Drake, but the song failed to chart. The video featured the band performing in a warehouse, eventually getting sprayed with water sprinklers as the storyline of a conflicted couple occurs. In July, "Emergency" was released as the second single, the video again reuniting the band with director Shane Drake and featuring Hunter Lamb (rhythm guitar), who replaced Jason Bynum in December 2005. The video for "Emergency" showcased Paramore in another performance, this time fixing the members' bloody costumes. The third single, "All We Know", was released with limited airtime, with the video consisting of a collection of live performances and backstage footage. After the band's later success, All We Know Is Falling and "Pressure" were certified Gold by the RIAA.

In January 2006, the band took part in the Winter Go West tour, where they played alongside Seattle bands Amber Pacific and the Lashes. In February, Hayley Williams was featured on "Keep Dreaming Upside Down" by October Fall. In spring of 2006, Paramore was an opening act on tours for both Bayside and the Rocket Summer. The band then covered Foo Fighters' "My Hero" for the Sound of Superman soundtrack.

During the summer of 2006, Paramore played a portion of Warped Tour, primarily on the Volcom and Hurley Stages. During the band's time at Warped Tour, they released The Summer Tic EP, which was sold exclusively during the tour. Paramore's first US headlining tour began on August 2, 2006, to a sold-out audience with support from This Providence, Cute Is What We Aim For, and Hit the Lights. That year they were voted "Best New Band", and Hayley Williams was voted as No. 2 "Sexiest Female", by readers of the British magazine Kerrang!.

In 2007, Lamb left the group to get married, and Paramore continued onward as a quartet. Paramore was then named by British magazine NME as one of ten bands to watch out for in their "New Noise 2007" feature. Paramore was featured in Kerrang! magazine once more; however, Hayley Williams believed the article was an untrue portrayal of the band, particularly because it focused on her as the main component. Afterwards, Williams addressed the issue in the band's LiveJournal, with a post saying, "we could've done without a cover piece. sorry, if it offends anyone at Kerrang! but I don't think there was one bit of truth in that article." In April, Hayley Williams' vocals were featured in "Then Came To Kill" by the Chariot. They headlined a tour in April through May 2007 with This Providence, the Almost, and Love Arcade. The Almost and Love Arcade were replaced by Quietdrive for the second half of the tour.

=== 2007–2008: Riot! ===
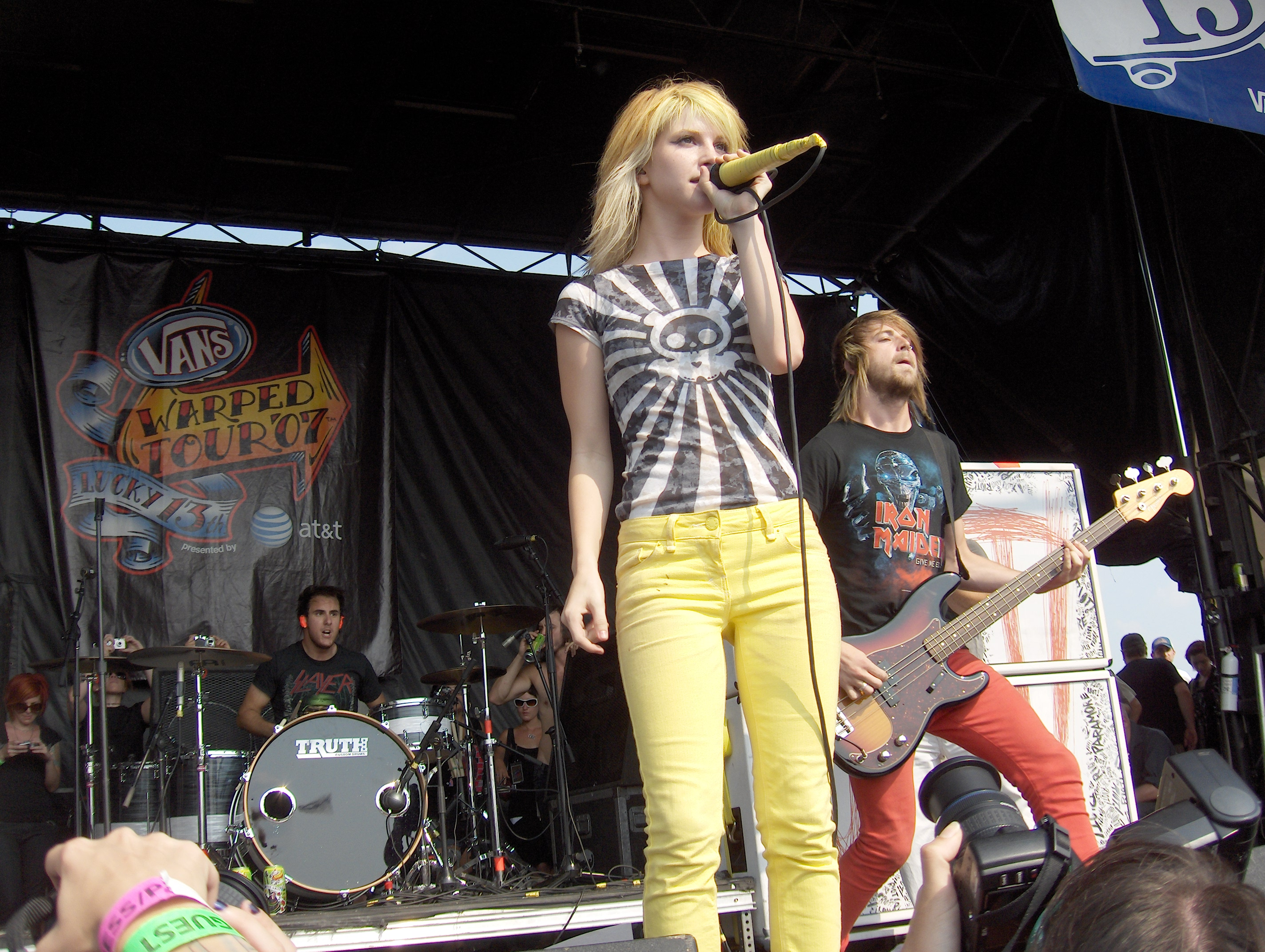
Paramore performing at the 2007 Vans Warped Tour in Camden, New Jersey

Before work began on the band's next album, Davis was expelled from the band due to "his lack of work ethic and participation in things that Zac, Hayley and I didn't agree with," according to Josh Farro. After an agreement involving the remaining three members, Davis was reinstated as bassist, and Taylor York became the band's new guitarist. York had been in a band with the Farro brothers before the two met Williams.

Paramore recorded the album with producer David Bendeth, who had previously worked with Hawthorne Heights, The Red Jumpsuit Apparatus, and Killswitch Engage. The album was recorded in New Jersey. The album, titled Riot!, was released on June 12, 2007, entering the Billboard 200 at number 20 and the UK charts at number 24. The album sold 44,000 units its first week in the United States. The name Riot! had been chosen because it meant "a sudden outburst of uncontrolled emotion," and it was a word that "summed it all up." "Misery Business" was released as the first single from the album. According to when discussing what Misery Business was about, Williams stated, "When I was 13 or 14 and I had a crush on Josh, he didn't like me back," Williams said. "He would go hang out with his girlfriend, who I wrote 'Misery Business' about because I was a dick." In the summer of 2007, Paramore participated in their third Warped Tour, and posted journals of their experiences on yourhereblog for MTV.

On October 11, 2007, the music video for "Crushcrushcrush" debuted on television in the United States as the next single from Riot!. The video for "Crushcrushcrush" featured the band playing a performance in a barren desert, being spied upon, and later destroying their equipment. The single was released in the United States on November 19 and made available in the United Kingdom on November 12, 2007. Hayley Williams recorded guest vocals for the tracks "The Church Channel" and "Plea" for the Say Anything concept album In Defense of the Genre, released on October 23, 2007. The group performed live in an acoustic style in Boston on November 29, 2007, for FNX Radio. On December 31, 2007, Paramore performed on the MTV New Year's Eve program which ran from 11:30 p.m. to 1:00 a.m.

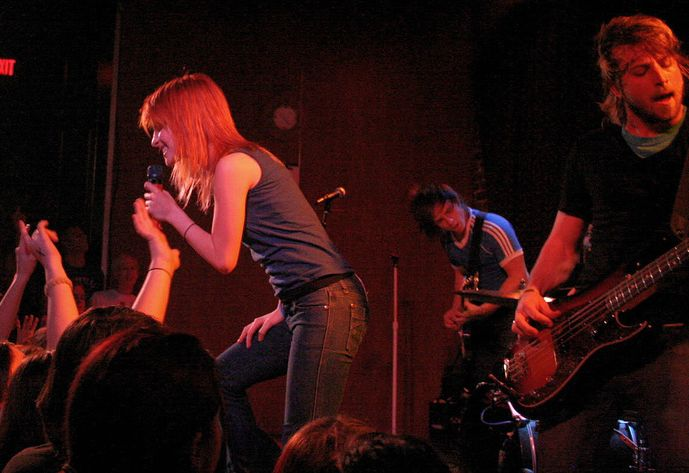
Paramore at the Social in Orlando, Florida, on April 23, 2007

Paramore was featured on the cover of February 2008 issue of Alternative Press magazine and voted "Best Band Of 2007" by the readers. The band was nominated for "Best New Artist" at the 50th Annual Grammy Awards, presented on February 10, 2008. Early 2008 saw Paramore touring the United Kingdom, supporting their album Riot!, along with New Found Glory. In early February 2008, the band began a tour in Europe; however, on February 21, 2008, the band announced that they had canceled six shows due to personal issues. Williams wrote on the band's website that "the break will give that band 'a chance to get away and work out our personal issues'". MTV.com reported that fans of Paramore were speculating about the future of the band and reported rumors of trouble had begun earlier in the month, when Josh Farro expressed his anger against the media's focus on Hayley Williams. The band, however, returned to their hometown to record the music video for the fourth single "That's What You Get", which was then released on March 24, 2008.

The band toured with Jimmy Eat World in the United States in April and May 2008. The band headlined the Give it a Name festival in the United Kingdom on May 10 and 11, 2008. Paramore played their first Ireland show at the RDS in Dublin on June 2, 2008, followed by the 2008 Vans Warped Tour from July 1–6. Starting on July 28, Paramore embarked on a tour named "The Final Riot!". They were joined by Jack's Mannequin, Phantom Planet, and Paper Route on the tour. The band released a live album named The Final Riot! on November 25, 2008. The album includes a bonus DVD with a full concert recorded in Chicago, as well as a behind the scenes documentary. As of April 9, 2009, The Final Riot! is certified gold in the United States.

=== 2009–2011: Brand New Eyes, departure of the Farros, and Singles Club ===
In September 2008, Williams announced that the band were planning on releasing their third studio album in summer 2009. On November 18, 2008, the band announced they were in the process of writing their next album.

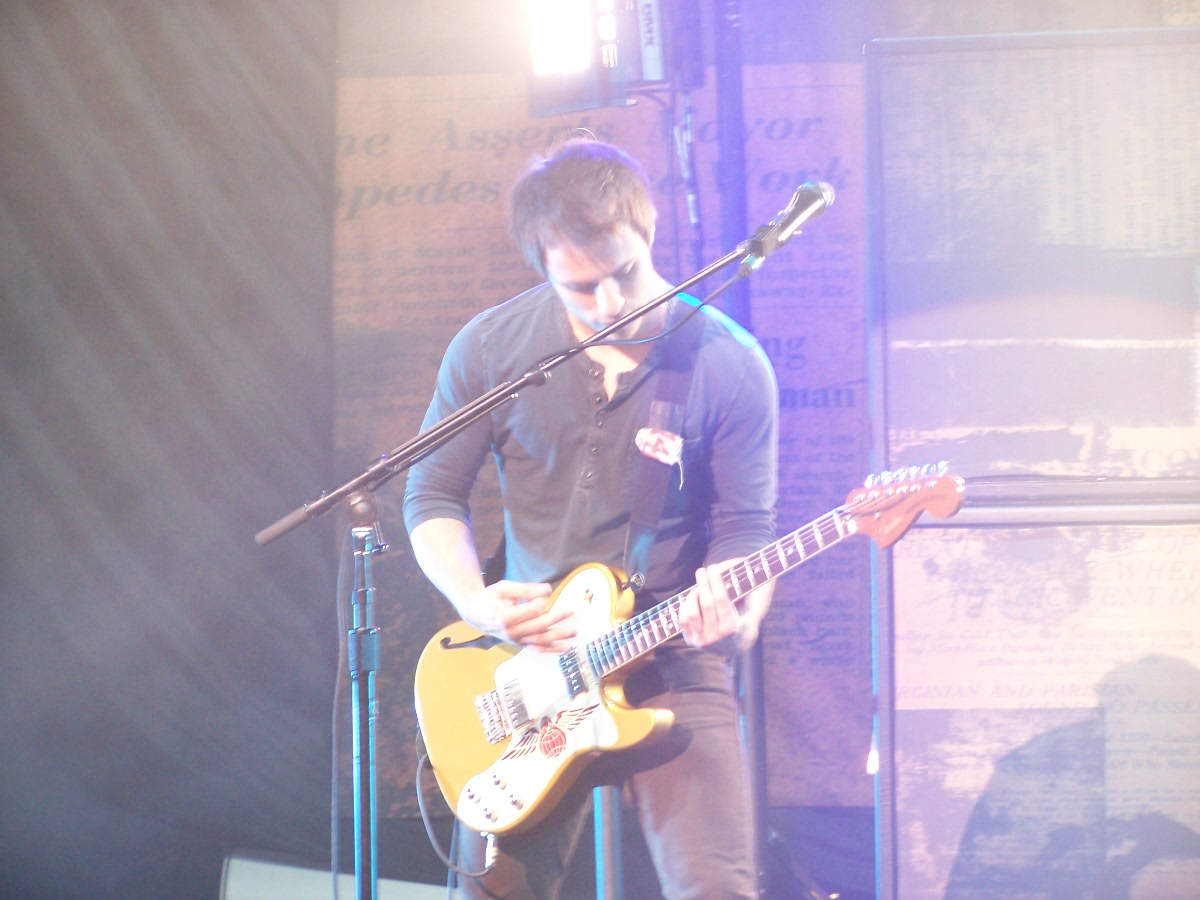
Josh Farro in Vancouver on the Summer Tour 2009

Paramore spent six weeks in pre-production at Emac Studios in their hometown of Franklin, the first time they had undergone pre-production without the guidance of a producer. The band was visited by record producer Rob Cavallo who reassured the band that they were on the right track. The band subsequently felt that the album and that their new material had the potential to surpass the success of their previous work. The band originally planned to record in Nashville, but ended up recording in Calabasas, California, with Cavallo in March 2009. The first single from the album was "Ignorance" and was released July 7, 2009. Paramore was the special guest with Bedouin Soundclash, The Sounds and Janelle Monáe at the No Doubt Summer Tour 2009, starting in May 2009 in outdoor amphitheaters and arenas across the US and Canada. The official music video for "Ignorance" aired on all MTV platforms, networks, and websites on August 13, 2009. Paramore, along with Paper Route and The Swellers, toured in support of Brand New Eyes in the fall of 2009. Some tour dates were postponed due to Hayley Williams becoming infected with laryngitis. "Brick By Boring Brick", "The Only Exception", "Careful" and "Playing God" were the album's following singles. "The Only Exception" was a top-forty single and went platinum in Ireland and the UK. To promote the album, the band recorded a performance for MTV Unplugged.

Paramore then played a sold out 15-date European tour with You Me At Six, Paper Route and Now Now Every Children. Their stadium tour culminated at London's Wembley Arena, to an audience of 12,500. The band performed in 2010 in the Australian Soundwave Festival along with bands such as Faith No More, AFI, You Me at Six, All Time Low, A Day to Remember, and Taking Back Sunday. Shortly before the tour, lead guitarist Josh Farro announced that he was engaged and stayed behind to plan his wedding. Justin York, brother of Taylor York, filled in for him on the tour. The band, with Farro returned, embarked on a spring tour of the U.S. in late April. The band headlined the 2010 Honda Civic Tour, which began on July 23 in Raleigh, NC and closed on September 19 in Anaheim, CA. After a short United Kingdom tour in November 2010, the band announced, on December 2, 2010, the official dates for a South American tour to take place during February and March 2011. The band were set to take a break after their South American Tour in 2011 to write for their fourth studio album.

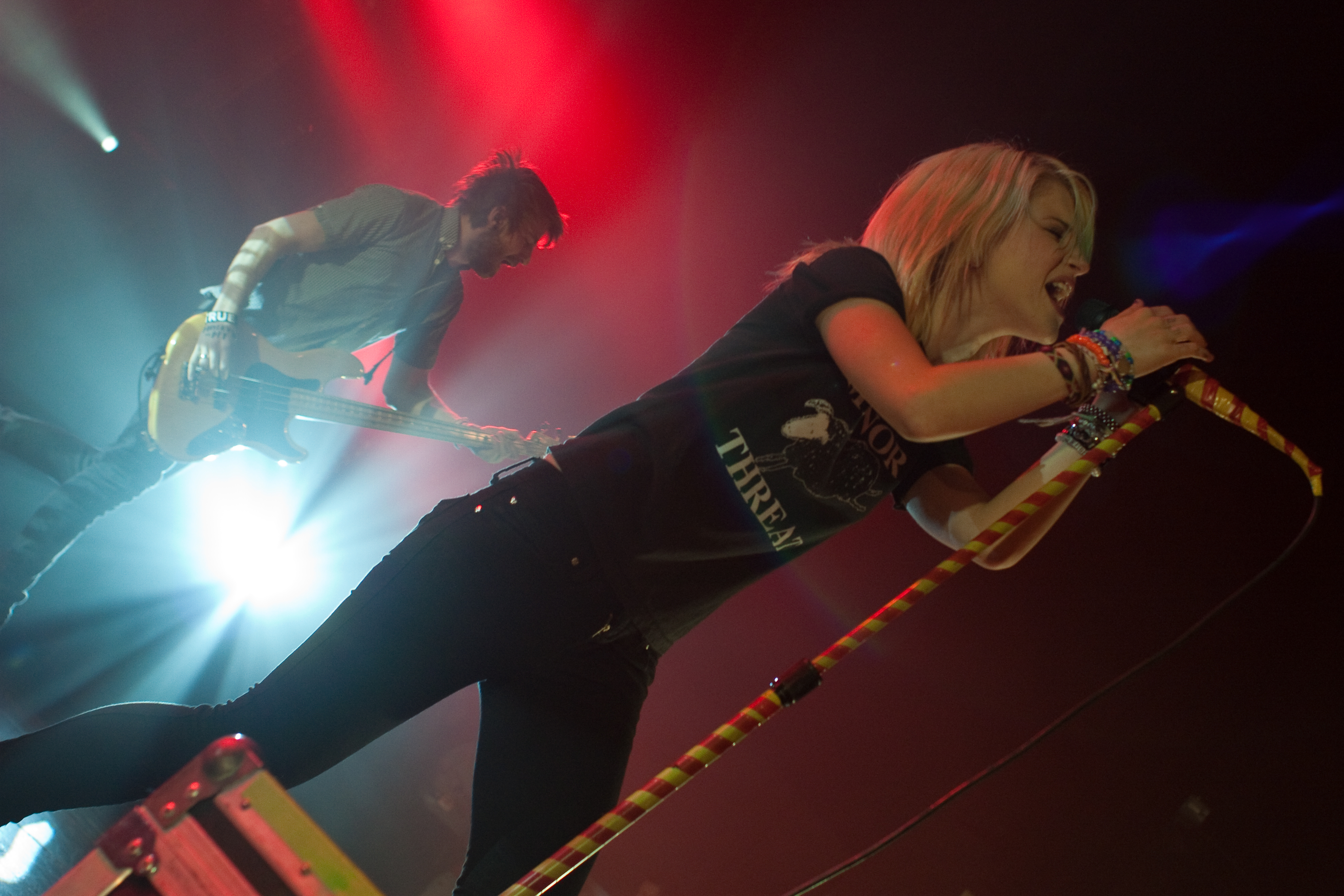
Paramore in the Brand New Eyes World Tour at the Warfield in San Francisco

On December 18, 2010, a message was released through Paramore.net stating that Josh and Zac Farro were leaving the band. The band also confirmed the scheduled South American tour would still happen. Josh Farro wrote a statement on the departure on his Blogger, claiming that the band had become "a manufactured product of a major-label." He accused Williams of being manipulated by her management and her parents, treating the group as her solo project, and claimed she was the only member of the band who was signed to Atlantic Records, while her bandmates were simply "riding on the coattails of her dream." On December 30, 2010, MTV News interviewed Williams, York and Davis in Franklin, Tennessee, regarding their reactions to Farro's response. The band members confirmed many of Farro's statements, notably that Williams was indeed the only member of the band actually signed to Atlantic. They added that they felt the statement was irrelevant, and claimed they had addressed many of the Farro's critiques already throughout the course of their career.

On January 10, 2011, in an interview with MTV, Hayley Williams said that despite the band losing two of its founding members, they would release new music in 2011, although they had not confirmed if it would be a full album for release or just a small number of songs. The singer also admitted that Paramore's style was likely to change with the new lineup, but clarified that the band would still retain their core signature sound. Paramore later confirmed they were entering a studio in Los Angeles with producer Rob Cavallo to record what would be the Singles Club.

On June 3, 2011, Paramore released the single "Monster", featured on the Transformers: Dark of the Moon soundtrack. This is the first song that the band released without the Farro brothers. On June 9, 2011, Hayley Williams announced that the band had started to write their fourth album, which they hoped to start recording at the end of the year, with an early 2012 release. On October 11, 2011, Paramore announced that they would release a new song for each of the remaining months of 2011. The band set up the Singles Club on their website which gave fans the chance to purchase the singles when they were released, as they were released exclusively through the Singles Club and were therefore not sold elsewhere. A song called "Renegade", premiered the day of the announcement, with "Hello Cold World" following on November 7, and "In the Mourning" on December 5. In 2011, former member, Josh Farro, formed Novel American, with Zac Farro later joining the band.

=== 2012–2015: Paramore and Davis' third exit ===
On April 18, 2012, Williams announced that the producer for their fourth album was Justin Meldal-Johnsen. Current Angels & Airwaves and former Nine Inch Nails drummer Ilan Rubin was confirmed to be the session drummer for the recording of the album. Paramore was officially released on April 5, 2013, and a number one at US albums chart Billboard 200. The first single from the album, titled "Now", was released online on January 22, 2013, and the album's second single, "Still Into You", was released on March 14, 2013, achieving commercial success. The third single, "Daydreaming", was released on December 2, 2013. The album's fourth single, "Ain't It Fun", was released on February 4, 2014, eventually becoming the band's highest-charting song in the United States and a winner for Best Rock Song at the 57th Annual Grammy Awards. On November 24, 2014, Paramore: Self-Titled Deluxe was released, which includes a remake of "Hate to See Your Heart Break", a song originally on Paramore, featuring Joy Williams; this is the band's first collaboration on a song. The band embarked on an intimate tour with Copeland, they added in a blog post: "It feels right to bring the Self-Titled era to a close. We've had a very personal and hugely triumphant journey with this one. What wouldn't feel right is saying goodbye to this time in the band's career and not celebrating it with our fans in some special way."

On December 14, 2015, bassist Jeremy Davis fully left the band, marking his third and final departure from the group. In March 2016, Davis was involved in a legal battle with Paramore, claiming to be eligible to enjoy the benefits of a business partnership with Hayley Williams as a co-owner of the band. This was quickly dismissed and he was again involved in a legal battle with Hayley Williams and Taylor York over a breach of contract that would entitle him to ownership and authorship of songs on their self-titled record, including "Ain't It Fun". He also claimed to be eligible to enjoy the benefits of the earnings the two received from these songs and album. Davis reached a settlement with the band in May 2017.

During this period, lead singer Williams later revealed that she suffered from depression and mental health issues following the departure of Davis as well as a divorce with her ex-husband Chad Gilbert. In an interview with Zane Lowe on Beats 1 Radio, she has described it as "torment" and mentioned that she "didn't laugh for a long time." As a result, Williams privately left the band for a short period in 2015, briefly leaving York as the only remaining member of the group.

=== 2016–2019: Zac Farro's return and After Laughter ===
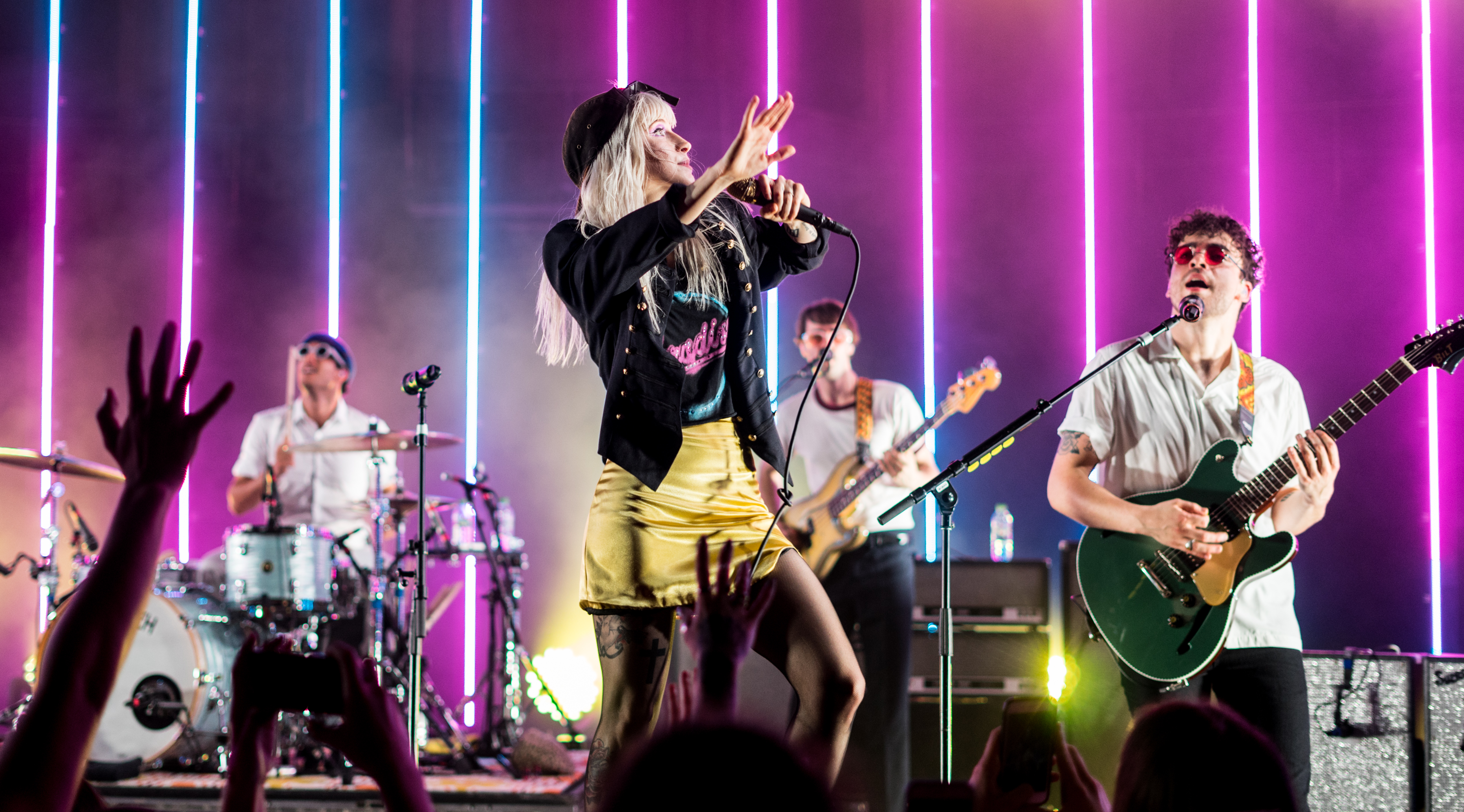
Paramore at the Royal Albert Hall in London, June 2017

On January 19, 2016, Williams announced that the band was in the process of writing their fifth album. On June 8, 2016, the band posted a short video of themselves in the studio to their social media. This was preceded by a number of images which all included both former drummer Zac Farro and producer Justin Meldal-Johnsen, leading fans and various media outlets to speculate the return of Farro. On June 17, Farro was featured yet again in a picture uploaded to social media, this time behind a drum set, confirming that he would be recording drums for the album, though he later clarified that he was only recording drums for the album and that he had not rejoined the band as a full member. Despite this, on February 2, 2017, the band announced that Farro would return as the official drummer of the band.

On April 19, 2017, Paramore released "Hard Times" as the lead single from their album After Laughter, which they announced would be released on May 12, 2017. On May 3, a second single was released, titled "Told You So". A music video for the song "Fake Happy" was released on November 17, 2017. On February 5, 2018, a music video for "Rose-Colored Boy" was released, which is also the album's fourth single. The music video for "Caught in the Middle", the album's fifth single, was released on June 26, 2018. On September 7, 2018, Hayley Williams announced during a concert that the band will play the song "Misery Business" "for the last time for a really long time," mainly due to a line from the second verse that was perceived to be sexist, though this decision was reversed in 2022.

=== 2020–present: This Is Why and hiatus ===
On May 11, 2020, Williams teased a potential return to a more guitar-driven sound on the band's sixth album, commenting, "We've found ourselves listening to a lot of older music that we grew up being inspired by." In January 2022, it was confirmed that the band had entered the studio to work on their upcoming sixth studio album. The band described the album as more "guitar heavy". On January 18, the band was announced to headline the newly founded Las Vegas–based When We Were Young festival alongside My Chemical Romance on October 22, 2022, which was one of the first live performances the band had played since September 2018. On May 10, it was announced that the band would headline the Austin City Limits Festival in Austin, Texas, during October on the 9th and 16th of the same year, alongside Red Hot Chili Peppers, Pink and Lil Nas X.

On July 15, 2022, it was announced that Paramore would be embarking on a tour in October and November 2022. On September 28, 2022, the band released the song "This Is Why" as the lead single from This Is Why, released on February 10, 2023. In November 2022, the band changed the album cover for their 2013 self-titled album to a picture of Hayley Williams from behind. On December 8, 2022, the band released the second single, "The News". On January 12, 2023, the band released the third single, "C'est Comme Ça". Paramore was nominated for Favorite Music Group at the 2023 Kids' Choice Awards. On February 6, 2023, the band debuted the song "Running Out of Time" at their album release show in Nashville. On February 16, 2023, the band released a music video for the album's fourth single, "Running Out of Time". The band's song, "This is Why", was nominated for "Best Alternative" at the 2023 MTV Video Music Awards.

The band began teasing an upcoming remix album, Re: This Is Why in late September 2023, posting audio snippets from the album on their official Discord server. The album was officially announced on October 2, and released on October 6, 2023. Described as "almost a remix album", Re: This Is Why features reworked, remixed, and rewritten versions of songs from the band's 2023 album This Is Why, as well as an unreleased B-side demo. For the 66th Annual Grammy Awards, This Is Why won Best Rock Album, making Paramore the first female-fronted rock band to win that Grammy award, and the album's title track won Best Alternative Music Performance.

On December 27, 2023, Paramore wiped their social media accounts and the band's website became inaccessible. A week later, they canceled a co-headlining appearance in Anaheim at iHeartRadio's Alter Ego festival scheduled for January 13, 2024, "due to unforeseen circumstances". In their place, Fall Out Boy was announced. Stereogum said that Paramore's label contract had expired. On January 10, 2024, A24 announced a tribute album for the Talking Heads concert film Stop Making Sense, which features a cover of "Burning Down The House" by Paramore as the leading track. In January 2024, the band was nominated for Best International Group at the 2024 BRIT Awards. On January 31, their cover of "Burning Down The House" was released as a single. On February 4, 2024, the band won two Grammy awards at the 66th Annual Grammy Awards with their album, This Is Why winning Best Rock Album and the title track winning Best Alternative Music Performance. On February 10, 2024, Paramore were announced as the ambassadors for Record Store Day 2024 and confirmed that they would continue as an independent band after the end of their contract with Atlantic Records. On March 1, 2024, a music video for "Thick Skull" was released. In September 2024, during an interview with Dork, Williams revealed that Paramore had already started making new music, with demos made before they went on tour with Taylor Swift.

On July 25, 2025, the band released a deluxe digital edition of their debut album, All We Know Is Falling for its 20th anniversary. On September 5, amongst breakup rumors, Williams announced that Paramore was "taking a break" following the release of Williams' third album Ego Death at a Bachelorette Party. Later that month, Williams announced that she and the band had joined the No Music for Genocide movement in response to the Gaza genocide, geo-blocking the band's entire music catalog and Williams' solo music from streaming platforms in Israel.

== Musical style and influences ==
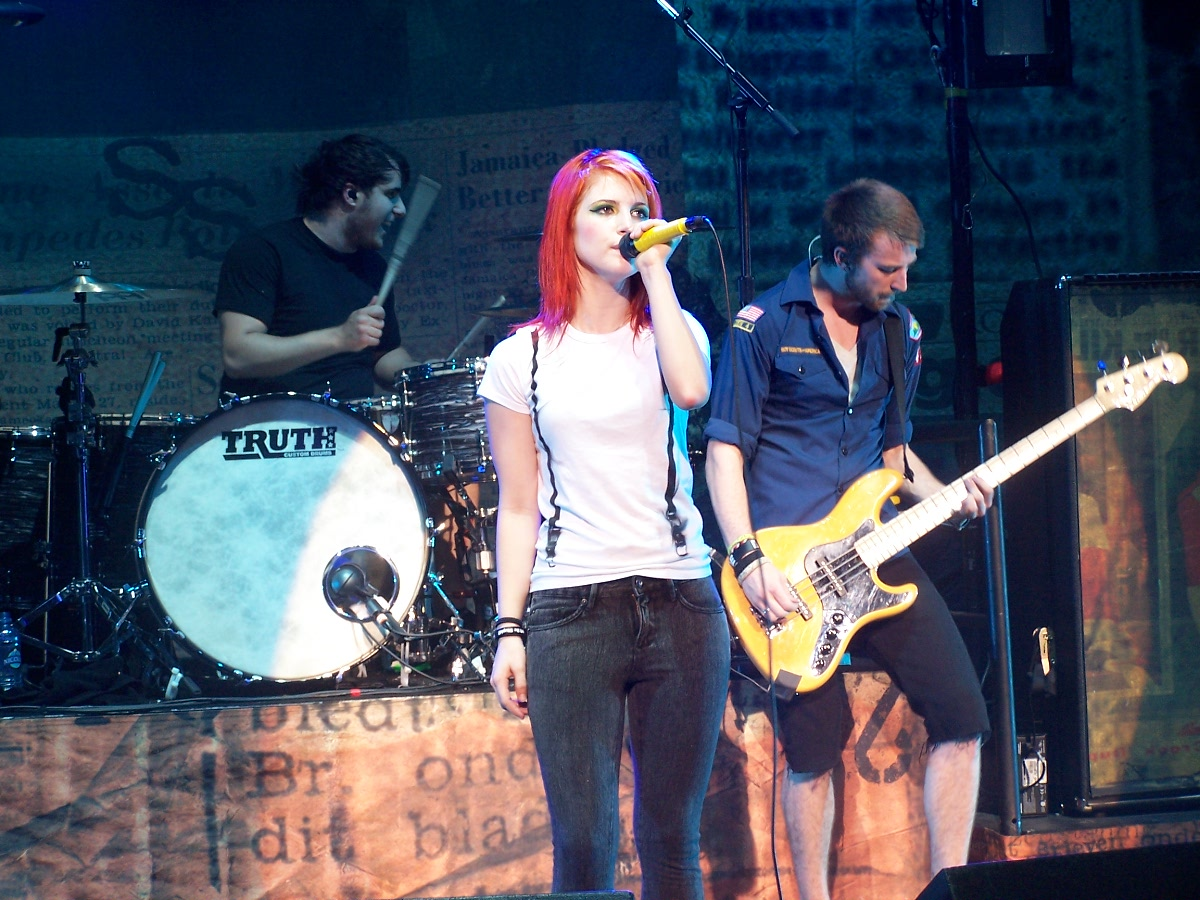
Paramore in Vancouver 2009

"Now"
17 second sample from Paramore's "Now"

Paramore's musical style has been described as pop-punk, emo, pop rock, alternative rock, new wave, power pop, emo pop, punk rock, grunge, and synth-pop. (Note: Musical styles: "pop-punk"; "emo"; "pop rock"; "alternative rock"; "new wave"; "power pop"; "emo pop"; "punk rock"; "grunge"; "synth-pop") Joshua Martin had written after an interview with Hayley Williams, "The band isn't just a short pop-punk girl with red hair and a spunky attitude. Their music is like them, it's aged differently. It's sped up, and slowed down. It's emo without being whiny, or bratty. Almost a very literal anti-Avril Lavigne." Alternative Press magazine had commented that the band was "young-sounding", while consistently being "honest". Paramore's first album All We Know is Falling had an arguably more "formulaic pop-punk" sound that was "delivered particularly well" and the combination of the two had created a "refined rock infused pop/punk album". The band's second release, Riot! was said to explore a "diverse range of styles," however, not straying far from "their signature sound." The band's later albums, such as Paramore and After Laughter, included more of a new wave and synth-pop sound. The band's sixth studio album, This Is Why went for more of a post-punk and dance-punk sound.

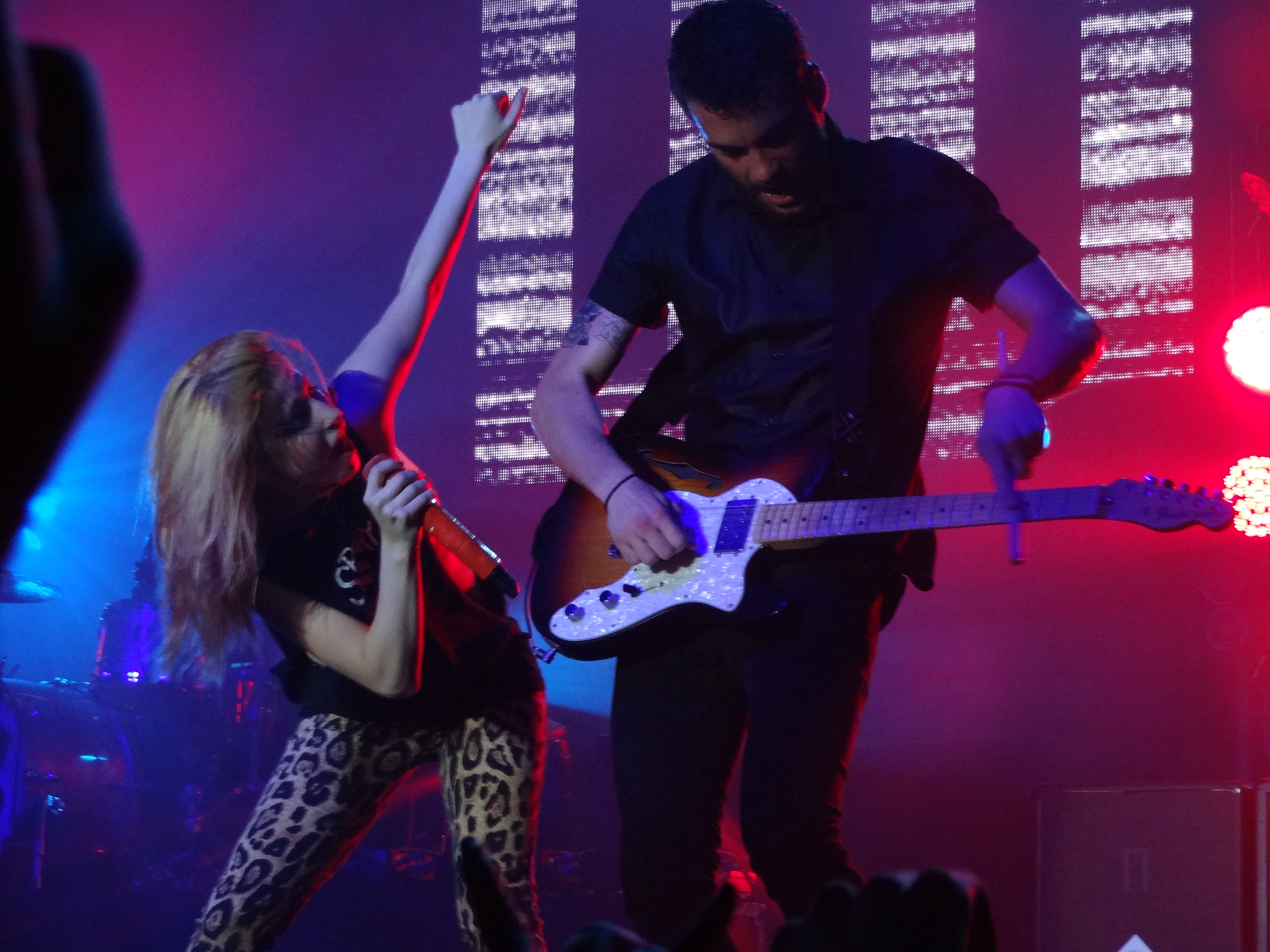
Williams and Taylor York performing with Paramore, 2013

Alternative Press and various other reviewers have noted that the band's stage performances have helped boost them to larger fame. Alternative Press states that Williams "has more charisma than singers twice her age, and her band aren't far behind in their chops, either." Singer-songwriter John Mayer had praised Williams' voice in a blog in October 2007, calling her "The great orange hope"; "orange" in reference to her hair color. Due to the female-fronted aspect of the band, Paramore has gained comparisons to Kelly Clarkson and the aforementioned Avril Lavigne, to which one reviewer said was "sorely unfounded". Reviewer Jonathan Bradley noted that "Paramore attacks its music with infectious enthusiasm." However, he also explained that "there isn't a whole lot of difference between Riot! and the songs from Kelly Clarkson or Avril Lavigne." A reviewer at NME had likened Paramore's sound to that of "No Doubt (stripped of all the ska bollocks)" and "Kelly Clarkson's wildest dreams".

Paramore has expressed appreciation for Weezer, Hum, Failure, Far, No Doubt, Deftones, the Smiths, Blink-182, Death Cab for Cutie, Jimmy Eat World, Sunny Day Real Estate, and New Found Glory. Hayley Williams has cited her personal influences as MewithoutYou, Elvis Presley, the Shirelles, the Angels, the Ramones, Jawbreaker, Freddie Mercury, Karen O, Josh Scogin, Blondie, Bloc Party, NSYNC, Aaliyah, the Smiths, Siouxsie and the Banshees, the Cure, and Etta James. Williams named many singers as heroines: "I love Debbie Harry and Siouxsie Sioux. I grew up listening to The Distillers [...] Girl groups are really important to me, but the Shangri-Las especially". Williams also explained that bands such as U2, "who are massive, and do whatever they want, write whatever they want and they stand for something," Jimmy Eat World, "who I don't think ever disappoint their fans," and No Doubt, who "have done amazing things", act as a pattern for the path in which Paramore would like to take their career. In 2012, Williams contributed vocals to MewithoutYou's fifth studio album, Ten Stories.

The band members identified themselves as Christians in the past, and in an interview with the BBC. Josh Farro stated, "Our faith is very important to us. It's obviously going to come out in our music because if someone believes something, then their worldview is going to come out in anything they do. But we're not out here to preach to kids, we're out here because we love music." Farro later cited differing views on Christianity between him, his brother, and Williams as one of the reasons for their departure in 2010. In a 2022 interview, Williams described herself, York, and Zac Farro as being "at different stages of unravelling their relationship to faith". In 2025, Williams released the track "True Believer" as part of her third solo album Ego Death at a Bachelorette Party. The song discusses the guise of Christianity as an excuse for people to treat others badly.

The staff of Consequence ranked the band at number 8 on their list of "The 100 Best Pop Punk Bands" in 2019.

== Live appearances ==
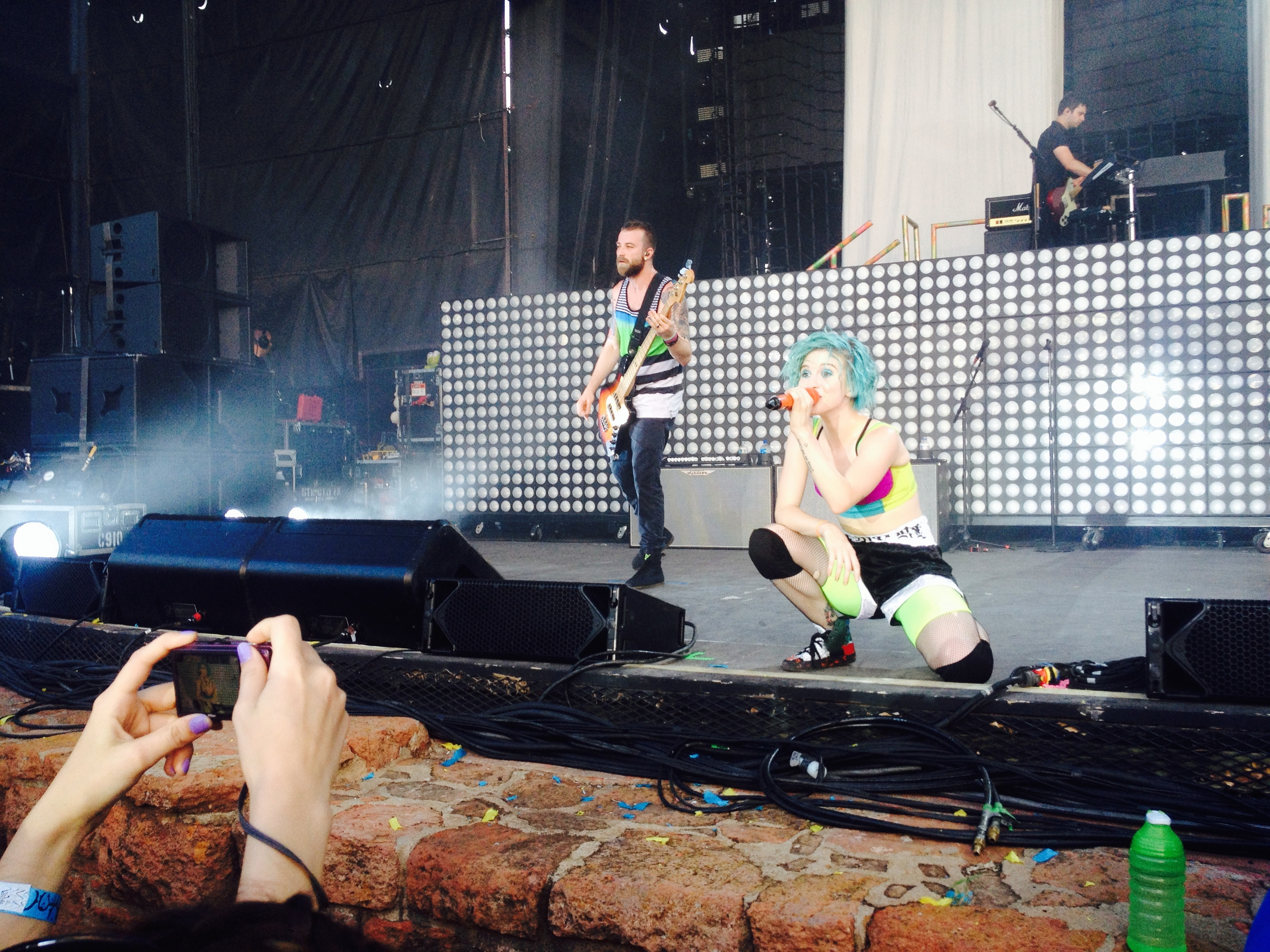
Paramore performing at a concert during the Monumentour

In 2007, the band played an acoustic set for the grand opening of a Warped Tour exhibit at the Rock and Roll Hall of Fame, and the dress Hayley Williams wore in the video for "Emergency" was also put on display in the exhibit.

In June 2007, they were declared by Rolling Stone as "Ones to Watch".

In August 2007, Paramore was featured in television spots on MTV, performing acoustic versions of their songs or acting in short accompaniments to MTV program commercials. As "MTV Artists of the Week", the band filmed the faux camping-themed spots in Queens, New York, all written and directed by Evan Silver and Gina Fortunato. MTV.com also has a collection of short videos with the band to promote Riot! as well. For weeks in August 2007, the "Misery Business" video was the number one streamed video at MTV.com. On October 8, Paramore played "Misery Business" live on Late Night with Conan O'Brien. In August, Paramore participated in New Found Glory's music video for their cover of Sixpence None the Richer's song "Kiss Me".

From September 29 to November 1, 2009, the band held a tour in North America to support Brand New Eyes. The tour for their self-titled fourth album, known as The Self-Titled Tour, took place in North America from October 15 to November 27, 2013. From June 19 through August 17, 2014, the band also supported the album with the Monumentour. They then continued with their fifth album, called the After Laughter Tour and their sixth album the This is Why tour.

Starting on March 27, 2023, Paramore became the opener for Taylor Swift’s the Eras Tour for the first show in Glendale, Arizona. From May 9 to August 20, 2024, Paramore became the opener for the entirety of Swift's European tour.

== Media appearances ==
In 2005, Paramore made its first video game appearance with the song "Pressure" being featured in the console versions of the video game The Sims 2.

In March 2008, Paramore made its first rhythm game appearance with "Crushcrushcrush" as a downloadable track in the video game Rock Band and later being a playable song in Guitar Hero On Tour: Decades. Later that year, Rock Band 2 was released with the song "That's What You Get" included as a playable track. The video game Guitar Hero World Tour featured the song "Misery Business" along with Hayley Williams participating in motion capture sessions for the game. She is featured as an unlockable character in the game as well. "Misery Business" was also featured as an on-disc track on Rock Band 3, while "Pressure", "The Only Exception", "Brick by Boring Brick", and "Ignorance" are available as downloadable tracks for the game. In 2015, the song "Still Into You" was featured as an on-disc song for Rock Band 4. "Crushcrushcrush" was also featured in the 2010 console edition of Dance Dance Revolution for the PlayStation 3 and Nintendo Wii.

Paramore's song "Decode" was the lead single for the film Twilight. Another song called "I Caught Myself" is also featured on the film's soundtrack. "Decode" was released on October 1, 2008, on the Paramore Fan Club site as well as author Stephenie Meyer's website. The music video premiered on November 3. Hot Topic hosted listening parties for the soundtrack on October 24, 2008, and the album was released on November 4, 2008. "Misery Business" is also featured in Saints Row 2 and in NHL 08.

The music video for "Decode", along with the Twilight film trailer, was shown in the North American Home Theater of PlayStation Home from December 11, 2008, to December 18, 2008. The video premiered in full through MTV on November 3, 2008, one day ahead of the release of the soundtrack on which the song is featured.

Paramore's song "Now" is featured as a song for the game Rocksmith 2014. In March 2024, "Misery Business" was added as a playable track to Fortnite Festival, being joined by "Ain't It Fun" and "Still Into You" in March 2025.

== Band members ==
Current members

- Hayley Williams – lead vocals (2004–present), keyboards (2012–present)
- Taylor York – guitar (2009–present; session/touring musician 2007–2009), keyboards (2012–present), backing vocals (2017–present)
- Zac Farro – drums, percussion (2004–2010, 2017–present), keyboards, backing vocals (2017–present)

Former members

- Josh Farro – guitar, backing vocals (2004–2010)
- Jason Bynum – guitar, backing vocals (2004–2005)
- Hunter Lamb – guitar (2005–2007)
- Jeremy Davis – bass (2004–2005, 2005–2006, 2007–2015)
- John Hembree – bass (2005)

Current touring musicians

- Brian Robert Jones – guitar, bass, backing vocals (2022–present)
- Joey Howard – bass, backing vocals (2015–present)
- Logan MacKenzie – keyboards, guitar (2017–present)
- Joseph Mullen – percussion (2017–present)

Former touring musicians

- Jon Howard – guitar, keyboards, percussion, backing vocals (2010–2016)
- Justin York – guitar, backing vocals (2010–2022)
- Josh Freese – drums (2010–2011)
- Jason Pierce – drums (2011–2012)
- Hayden Scott – drums (2012–2013)
- Ilan Rubin – drums (2013)
- Miles McPherson – drums (2013)
- Aaron Gillespie – drums (2013–2017)

== Discography ==
Studio albums

- All We Know Is Falling (2005)
- Riot! (2007)
- Brand New Eyes (2009)
- Paramore (2013)
- After Laughter (2017)
- This Is Why (2023)

== Tours ==
Headlining tours

- The Final Riot! Tour (2008)
- Brand New Eyes World Tour (2009–2012)
- The Self-Titled Tour (2013–2015)
- After Laughter Tour (2017–2018)
- This Is Why Tour (2022–2023)

Co-headlining tours

- Honda Civic Tour (2010)
- Monumentour (2014)

Opening acts

- No Doubt – Summer Tour 2009 (2009)
- Green Day – 21st Century Breakdown World Tour (2010)
- Taylor Swift – The Eras Tour (2023–2024)

== See also ==
- List of awards and nominations received by Paramore
- List of songs recorded by Paramore
- List of alternative rock artists
