= The Catch =

The Catch may refer to:

== Film and television ==
- The Catch (American TV series), a 2016–2017 American mystery series
- The Catch (British TV series), a 2023 British family drama series
- The Catch (1961 film), by Nagisa Oshima
- The Catch (1983 film), a Japanese film by Shinji Sōmai
- The Catch (2017 film), a Canadian short film by Holly Brace-Lavoie
- The Catch (2027 film), an American comedy film starring Emma Stone and Chris Pine

== Music ==
- The Catch (American band), a rock band from Seattle, Washington
- The Catch (British duo), a new wave duo
- The Catch (album), a 1984 album by Nazareth
- The Catch, a band featuring Annie Lennox and Dave Stewart before they formed the Tourists

== Sport ==
=== Baseball ===
- The Catch (baseball), a defensive play by Willie Mays in the 1954 World Series
  - "The Catch", an installation artwork by Thom Ross as a recreation of Mays' famous catch
- The Catch, a defensive play by Endy Chávez in Major League Baseball's 2006 National League Championship Series
- The Catch, a defensive play by Chas McCormick in the 2022 World Series

=== Gridiron football ===
- The Catch (college football), a winning touchdown reception by Jerry Butler of Clemson against South Carolina in 1977
- The Catch (American football), a winning touchdown reception by Dwight Clark in the 1981 NFC Championship
- The Catch, a reception by Alabama receiver Tyrone Prothro that was named 2006 ESPY Best Play of the Year
- The Catch, Tony Gabriel's winning touchdown reception in the Canadian Football League's 64th Grey Cup in 1976

== Other uses ==
- The Catch (novel), a 2014 novel by Taylor Stevens
- "The Catch", a short story in Nadine Gordimer's 1957 collection The Soft Voice of the Serpent

== See also ==
- Catch (disambiguation)
- The Helmet Catch, an Eli Manning pass to David Tyree in Super Bowl XLII
