= Catching =

Catching may refer to:

- Dave Catching (born 1961), American musician
- Catching, one translation of łapanka (also rafle), a Nazi German practice of random arrests in Polish cities during World War II
- Catching, an informal term for contagious

== See also ==
- Catch (disambiguation)
- Catcher
- Catchings, a surname
- All articles starting with "Catching"
