= Catch-22 (disambiguation) =

Catch-22 is a 1961 post-modernist satirical novel by Joseph Heller.

Catch-22 or CATCH-22 may also refer to:

== Film and television ==
- Catch-22 (film), the 1970 film adaptation of the novel Catch-22
- Catch-22 (miniseries), 2019 American-British-Italian TV adaptation of the novel Catch-22
- "Catch-22" (Dawson's Creek), a 2003 television episode
- "Catch-22" (Lost), a 2007 television episode

== Music ==
=== Albums ===
- Catch 22 (Hypocrisy album)
- Catch 22 (Tinchy Stryder album)
- Katch-22, side A of the Alien Sex Fiend album Curse

=== Songs ===
- "Catch 22" (song), by Illy featuring Anne-Marie from Two Degrees
- "Catch 22", a song by the Haunted from Unseen
- "Catch-22", a song by P!nk from Missundaztood
- "Catch 22", a 1982 song by Billy Squier from Emotions in Motion
- "Catch 22 (2 Steps Forward, 2 Steps Back)", a 1984 song by Steve Kipner from the Two of a Kind movie soundtrack

=== Performers ===
- Catch 22 (band), an American ska-punk band

== Other uses ==
- Catch-22 (logic), a type of logical conundrum illustrated by situations in the novel
- Catch22 (charity), a UK young people's charity
- Catch-22 (play), the 1971 Broadway adaptation of the novel
- Catch-22 (video game), a 2012 iOS game
- CATCH-22, a mnemonic describing symptoms of the genetic disorder 22q11.2 deletion syndrome

== See also ==
- Catch Thirtythree, an album by Meshuggah
- Dilemma
- Double bind, a term for a common instance of the catch-22 logical conundrum in psychology
- Hobson's choice
