= Stuck in the Middle =

Stuck in the Middle may refer to:

== Music ==
- "Stuck in the Middle with You", a 1972 song by Stealers Wheel
- "Stuck in the Middle" (Clea song), a 2004 song by girl band Clea
- "Stuck in the Middle", a 2007 song by Mika from his album Life in Cartoon Motion
- "Stuck in the Middle", a 2009 song by Jay Sean from his album All or Nothing
- "Stuck in the Middle", a 2012 song by Boys Like Girls from the album Crazy World
- "Stuck in the Middle" (Babymonster song), 2024

== Television ==
- Stuck in the Middle with You, a 2003 unaired pilot starring Timothy Busfield
- "Stuck in the Middle with You" (Doctors), a 2004 television episode
- "Stuck in the Middle with You" (After You've Gone), a 2007 television episode
- Stuck in the Middle (TV series), a 2016-2018 Disney Channel series starring Jenna Ortega

== Other ==
- Stuck in the Middle: 17 Comics from an Unpleasant Age, a 2007 anthology of comic tales edited by artist Ariel Schrag
