= Catch-22 (video game) =

2012 video game

- Developer: Mango Down
- Designers: Roel Bartstra, Marlon Etheredge, Guus Hoeve
- Platforms: iOS, Android
- Release: September 25, 2012
- Mode: Single-player

Catch-22 was an iOS game developed by Dutch indie studio Mango Down and released on September 25, 2012.

== Critical reception ==
The game had a rating of 87% based on 8 critic reviews.

The game was originally conceived during the global gamejam of 2012, that lasted 48 hrs. The original team of four people won the national gamejam, after which Guus Hoeve, Marlon Etheredge and Roel Bartstra developed the game for iOS exclusively and released it in August 2012. They tend to recreate the game in 2022, 10 years after, as each of them individually secretly want to do that as said by Guus Hoeve.

The game is the first Dutch indie-game that was ever selected to be one of the ten PAX10 games of 2012, after which the game was selected for IndieCade. In its lifetime, the game won over a dozen awards and was ranked 24 in the top 25 of best iOS games on Metacritic that year.

Digital Spy said "Catch-22 is one of those perfect games that will keep you playing just one more round long into the night. " 148Apps said "Blending together equal parts simplicity and self-induced complexity, the game is an ideal fit on the platform. Don't even bother to debate this ninety nine cent purchase. It should become a mandatory staple of your collection as soon as possible." Gamezebo wrote "The highest compliment I can pay to Catch-22 is that it feels like it was ripped right from the universe of the Rand and Robyn Miller's Myst. " AppAdvice said "It's ultra simple with only one game mode, though there are leaderboards and achievements that add some depth. "

GamesMaster UK described the game as "Soothingly simple". AppSpy wrote "The name encapsulates the gameplay of this high score zen puzzler beautifully. " TouchArcade said "The Catch-22 here is a game that is paradoxically fun, despite a few flaws and a lack of modes that would otherwise cripple less creative games. If the developer commits to its future growth and repair (functional achievements and a co-op mode), Catch-22 will become a score-chasing game that players and their friends will have even more reasons for which to return. " Pocket Gamer UK said "Catch 22's simple set up reveals a game that quickly becomes pretty tough, but always eggs you on to try again."
