= Fake Happy =

Single by Paramore

from the album After Laughter
- Released: August 29, 2017
- Studio: RCA Studio B (Nashville, Tennessee)
- Genre: New wave; pop rock; power pop
- Length: 3:55
- Label: Fueled by Ramen
- Songwriters: Hayley Williams; Taylor York
- Producers: Justin Meldal-Johnsen; Taylor York

Paramore singles chronology
"Told You So" (2017)	"Fake Happy" (2017)	"Rose-Colored Boy" (2018)

Music video
- "Fake Happy" on YouTube

"Fake Happy" is a song by American rock band Paramore. It was released on August 29, 2017, through Fueled by Ramen as the third single off their fifth studio album After Laughter (2017). Written by lead vocalist Hayley Williams and guitarist Taylor York and produced by Justin Meldal-Johnsen and York, the song was recorded in the band's hometown, Nashville, Tennessee.

== Background ==
Discussing the inspiration behind the song, Williams stated: "Well, I mean, the title is pretty self-explanatory. I think there's a lot of time we go out or we do things and we don't feel the way that we project, you know, that we wanna look like we feel..." In a Beats 1 interview with Zane Lowe, Williams also said regarding the song: "I hate phoniness. It's not fun to be around, it's not fun to do yourself. But then there are these moments in your life where you're professional and you have to have grace with yourself, you have to have grace with other people and work hard, but it's that self-preservation thing."

== Composition ==
Stylistically, "Fake Happy" has been labeled as new wave, pop rock, and power pop. According to NPR, "Fake Happy" is "a song that directly asserts a collective hopelessness with "We're all so fake happy / And I know fake happy," later complicating the emotion with the embarrassment not often explored in depression dialogue, the shame of feeling bad and the shame of feeling bad for feeling bad: "Don't ask me how I've been / Don't make me play pretend."" The song begins with "a hushed acoustic intro, with Williams' voice filtered through a kind of telephone effect," which then transforms with "a simple and effective synth riff" into an "ambitious, funky anthem about everyone masking their sadness." Brice Ezell of Consequence of Sound noted that while the song contains "bouncy synths" and a "sugary" hook, it "still echoes the angsty band that made Riot!." Similarly, Spin's Brad Nelson said the song's chorus "opens up a wormhole in the record, through which the band step and emerge sounding uncannily like the one that made 2009's Brand New Eyes."

== Release and live performances ==
"Fake Happy" was sent to alternative radio on August 29, 2017, serving as After Laughter's third single. The band had previously released a radio edit of the song on June 2, 2017, cutting the song's intro. The song was performed live for the first time on June 15, 2017, at the Olympia Theatre in Dublin, Ireland, as part of the band's After Laughter tour. The band also performed the song at Good Morning America on August 25, 2017, along with four other tracks from After Laughter, where it was announced as the latest single from the album.

== Music video ==
The music video for "Fake Happy" was released on November 17, 2017. It was directed by the band's drummer Zac Farro, and features Hayley Williams in a sequined bodysuit strolling through New York City, full of crowds with animated upside-down smiley faces pasted on their faces.

== Personnel ==
Credits adapted from the album's liner notes.

- Kevin "K-Bo" Boettger – assistant engineer
- Dave Cooley – mastering engineer
- Carlos de la Garza – mixer, engineer
- Zac Farro – drums, bells, keyboards, percussion, background vocals
- Justin Meldal-Johnsen – producer, engineer, bass guitar, keyboards, programming
- Mike Schuppan – engineer, additional mixer
- Hayley Williams – vocals, keyboards, percussion, background vocals
- Taylor York – producer, additional mixer, engineer, guitar, keyboards, marimba, percussion, programming, background vocals

== Charts ==
Chart performance for "Fake Happy"
Chart (2017)	Peak position
US Hot Rock & Alternative Songs (Billboard)	33
