= Catchings =

Catchings is a surname. Notable people with the name include:

- Fermine Baird Catchings (1858–1944), American genealogist
- Gladys L. Catchings (1901–1992), American nurse
- Haney Catchings (1949–2015), American football coach
- Harvey Catchings (born 1951), American basketball player
- Kanon Catchings, American basketball player
- Tamika Catchings (born 1979), American basketball player
- Thomas C. Catchings (1847–1927), American politician, U.S. Representative from Mississippi
- Toney Catchings (born 1965), American football player
- Waddill Catchings (1879–1967), American economist
