= In the Middle =

In the Middle may refer to:

- "In the Middle" (Alexander O'Neal song), 1993
- "In the Middle" (Sugababes song), 2004
- "In the Middle" (The Mamas song), 2021
- "In the Middle" (Ai song), 2021
- "In the Middle" (Natalia Barbu song), 2024
- "In the Middle", a song by Trey Songz from the album I Gotta Make It
- "In the Middle", a song by Theory of a Deadman from the album Gasoline
- "In the Middle", a song by Rodney Atkins from the album If You're Going Through Hell
- "In the Middle", a song by Dodie Clark from the EP You
- "In the Middle", a song by the Wanted from the album Word of Mouth
- "In the Middle", a song by Unlimited Touch from their 1981 album Unlimited Touch

== See also ==
- The Middle (TV series), American sitcom
