= Hard Times (Paramore song) =

2017 single by Paramore

Single by Paramore

from the album After Laughter
- Released: April 19, 2017
- Recorded: 2016
- Studio: RCA Studio A (Nashville, Tennessee)
- Genre: New wave; synth-pop; pop rock; alternative rock; disco
- Length: 3:02
- Label: Fueled by Ramen
- Songwriters: Hayley Williams; Taylor York
- Producers: Justin Meldal-Johnsen; Taylor York

Paramore singles chronology
"Ain't It Fun" (2014)	"Hard Times" (2017)	"Told You So" (2017)

Music video
- "Hard Times" on YouTube

Audio sample
- file; help

"Hard Times" is a song by American rock band Paramore from their fifth studio album, After Laughter. It was released on April 19, 2017, through Fueled by Ramen as the album's lead single. The song was written by lead vocalist Hayley Williams and guitarist Taylor York and was recorded in the band's hometown, Nashville, Tennessee. It is the first single to be released by the band since the return of drummer Zac Farro and the departure of former bassist Jeremy Davis.

The song received positive reviews, being compared to 1980s new wave and to the band's previous singles "Still Into You" and "Ain't It Fun".

== Background and composition ==
Lyrically, "Hard Times" is about the feeling of going through hard times, and being useless in achieving one's goals. According to DIY, "Hard Times" follows the "bombastic footsteps" of previous singles "Still Into You" and "Ain't It Fun", featuring a "huge chorus and sugary vocals". Eddie Fu at Consequence of Sound agrees, noting that it expands on the pop rock sound of those songs by "further incorporating 1980s new wave". According to Billboard writer Lindsey Byrnes, it is a pop rock song that features a tribal beat, and is reminiscent of 1980s new wave.

Likewise, Tom Breihan of Stereogum described it as "stiff funkiness of prime '80s new wave". Daniel Kreps at Rolling Stone characterized the song as "bubbly synth-pop". At The Guardian, the drums were compared to that of Lionel Richie, while the breakdown was described as "Daft Punk-style". In an interview with iHeartRadio, Williams states "This is a really big step for us as a band, and it's definitely a new sound. We're really proud of it. I feel like it really reflects exactly who we are right now in real time, and hopefully people will be into it." It has also been described as a disco and alternative rock song.

== Critical reception ==
The song received positive reviews from music critics. Joe Coscarelli at The New York Times praised the song, stating that Hayley Williams "remains the focus, and her nimble melodies and sneakily huge pop hooks are as crisp and magnetic as ever, unbeholden to genre walls." Brad Nelson of Pitchfork wrote positively of the song, calling it a "return to the vintage rhythms that informed 'Ain't It Fun,' but the new song unfolds in a context less obviously connected to rock and even further amputated from emo". Jordan Sargent from Spin named it as one of Paramore's best singles to date, adding that "It's also an interesting experiment, even if you don't care for Paramore's music."

Will Richards of DIY praised the song, saying that the band "never had as much fun as they're having right now," further stating that the chorus "instantly sticks in your brain like bubblegum". Billboard compared the song to Talking Heads and Blondie, stating "With the infectious quality of 'Hard Times' inspiring a jump-on-the-bed and use a hairbrush as a microphone type of vibe, Paramore's new chapter is a testament to what can happen not only when you weather the storm, but when you let yourself dance in the rain as well". Writing for The Inquirer, Joseph R. Atilano opines that the song is "a very solid track and is something that long time Paramore fans will surely enjoy listening to over and over again" but criticizes its short length, and mentions that Williams' vocals could be louder in some areas.

The Village Voice's Pazz & Jop annual critics' poll to find the best music of 2017 ranked "Hard Times" at number 11. In 2017, NME ranked the song number three on their list of the 10 greatest Paramore songs, and in 2021, Kerrang ranked the song number six on their list of the 20 greatest Paramore songs.

== Music video ==
The music video was directed by Andrew Joffe and shot at Optimist Studios over two days in March 2017. According to Joffe, the band wanted to "embody some kind of '80s vibe" and made use of "the kind of hand-drawn rotoscoping animation effects made famous in a-ha's 'Take On Me' and deploys a color palette straight out of Weird Science and Square Pegs". NPR's Lars Gotrich described the video as containing "early MTV-style effects, loud pastels and a performance space seemingly constructed out of an old Nickelodeon set". The animation effects were done by Portland-based creative studio, Computer Team. In October 2017, Paramore released a blooper reel of the video's green screen segments.

By October 2017, the song achieved 50 million views.

== Personnel ==
Credits adapted from the album's liner notes.

- Hayley Williams – vocals, keyboards, percussion, background vocals
- Taylor York – guitar, keyboards, marimba, percussion, programming, background vocals, producer, additional mixer, engineer
- Zac Farro – drums, bells, keyboards, percussion, background vocals
- Justin Meldal-Johnsen – bass guitar, keyboards, programming, producer, engineer
- Kevin "K-Bo" Boettger – assistant engineer
- Dave Cooley – mastering engineer
- Carlos de la Garza – mixer, engineer
- Mike Schuppan – engineer, additional mixer

== Charts ==
=== Weekly charts ===
Weekly chart performance for "Hard Times"
Chart (2017)	Peak position
Australia (ARIA)	61
Canada Hot 100 (Billboard)	65
Czech Republic Singles Digital (ČNS IFPI)	91
Finland Download (Latauslista)	13
Ireland (IRMA)	54
Japan Radio Songs (Billboard)	15
Latvia (Latvijas Top 40)	15
Mexico Ingles Airplay (Billboard)	12
Netherlands Single Tip (MegaCharts)	22
New Zealand Heatseekers (RMNZ)	2
Portugal (AFP)	85
Scottish Singles Sales (Official Charts)	14
Sweden Heatseeker (Sverigetopplistan)	2
UK Singles (Official Charts)	34
US Billboard Hot 100	90
US Hot Rock & Alternative Songs (Billboard)	6
US Adult Pop Airplay (Billboard)	24
US Rock & Alternative Airplay (Billboard)	17

=== Year-end charts ===
Year-end chart performance for "Hard Times"
Chart (2017)	Position
US Hot Rock Songs (Billboard)	17

== Certifications ==
Certifications for "Hard Times"
Region	Certification	Certified units/sales
Australia (ARIA)	Platinum	70,000^{‡}
Poland (ZPAV)	Gold	25,000^{‡}
New Zealand (RMNZ)	2× Platinum	60,000^{‡}
United Kingdom (BPI)	2× Platinum	1,200,000^{‡}
United States (RIAA)	Gold	500,000^{‡}
^{‡} Sales+streaming figures based on certification alone.

== Accolades ==
Accolades for "Hard Times"
Publication	Country	Accolade	Year	Rank
Billboard	United States	The 25 Best Rock Songs of 2017: Critics' Picks	2017	2

== Release history ==
Release dates and formats for "Hard Times"
Country	Date	Format	Label	Ref.
Worldwide	April 19, 2017	Digital download	Fueled by Ramen	
United States	April 25, 2017	Contemporary hit radio	Atlantic; RRP	

== Legacy ==
The song was featured in a montage sequence in the 2019 film Happy Death Day 2U.

== David Byrne version ==
"David Byrne Does Hard Times"

Single by David Byrne
- B-side: "Burning Down the House"
- Released: April 19, 2024
- Studio: Electric Lady Studios
- Length: 3:00
- Label: Atlantic
- Songwriters: Hayley Williams; Taylor York
- Producer: David Byrne

David Byrne singles chronology
"Everybody's Coming To My House" (2018)	"David Byrne Does Hard Times" (2024)

Official audio
- "David Byrne Does Hard Times" on YouTube

On April 19, 2024, after learning from Paramore that "Hard Times" was inspired by American band Talking Heads, the former frontman of the group, David Byrne, released a cover of the song. This release came after Paramore themselves contributed a cover of "Burning Down the House" for the Talking Heads tribute album Everyone's Getting Involved earlier that year.

Both covers were released together as A-side and B-side respectively on a limited edition twelve-inch single for Record Store Day 2024, for which Paramore were ambassadors.

=== Personnel ===
Musicians

- David Byrne – guitar, keyboards, lead vocals, production
- Andy Snitzer – tenor saxophone
- Bobby Wooten – bass
- Gareth Flowers – trumpet
- Jonathan Heim – trumpet
- Mauro Refosco – marimba, percussion, vibraphone
- Mike Seltzer – trombone
- Roger Rosenberg – baritone saxophone
- Sam Sadigursky – alto saxophone
- Tim Keiper – drums

Additional personnel

- Gosha Usov – engineering
- Stewart Lerman – engineering
- Michael Brauer – mixing
- Ruairi O'Flaherty – mastering
- Tony Finno – horn arrangement
