= Rose-Colored Boy =

Single by Paramore

from the album After Laughter
- Released: March 2, 2018
- Studio: RCA Studio B (Nashville, Tennessee)
- Genre: Pop rock; synthpop; new wave
- Length: 3:32
- Label: Fueled by Ramen
- Songwriters: Hayley Williams; Taylor York; Zac Farro
- Producers: Justin Meldal-Johnsen; Taylor York

Paramore singles chronology
"Fake Happy" (2017)	"Rose-Colored Boy" (2018)	"Caught in the Middle" (2018)

Music video
- "Rose-Colored Boy" on YouTube

"Rose-Colored Boy" is a song by American rock band Paramore. It was released on March 2, 2018, through Fueled by Ramen as the fourth single off their fifth studio album, After Laughter (2017).

== Composition ==
"Rose-Colored Boy" has been described as new wave by Rockfreaks.net, pop rock by Stereogum and synth-pop by Rolling Stone.

== Release and live performances ==
The band performed the song at Good Morning America on August 25, 2017, along with four other tracks from After Laughter. The band released a radio edit of the song on March 2, 2018, titled "Mix 2", with small changes. "Rose-Colored Boy" impacted American contemporary hit radio on March 27, 2018.

Williams often interpolates the lyrics of Tom Tom Club's "Genius of Love" into the chorus.

== Music video ==
A music video for the song was released on February 5, 2018. The video surrounds a fictional 80s talk show called Wake Up! Roseville, with the band members hosting. As hosts, the band members are under constant stress from executives, who scold the band (particularly vocalist Hayley Williams) for not creating a more positive environment, matching the lyrics "I ain't gon' smile if I don't want to". Williams at one point, frustrated, yells "F*ck it! We'll do it live," parodying an outtake from political commentator Bill O'Reilly on Inside Edition. The video ends with the band shown playing the song and causing chaos on set, before resuming the show the very next day, ending with Williams' smile fading.

== Personnel ==
Credits adapted from the album's liner notes.

- Kevin "K-Bo" Boettger – assistant engineer
- Dave Cooley – mastering engineer
- Carlos de la Garza – mixer, engineer
- Zac Farro – drums, bells, keyboards, percussion, background vocals
- Justin Meldal-Johnsen – producer, engineer, bass guitar, keyboards, programming
- Zelly Meldal-Johnsen – additional background vocals
- Mike Schuppan – engineer, additional mixer
- Hayley Williams – vocals, keyboards, percussion, background vocals
- Taylor York – producer, additional mixer, engineer, guitar, keyboards, marimba, percussion, programming, background vocals

== Charts ==
Chart performance for "Rose-Colored Boy"
Chart (2017–18)	Peak position
New Zealand Heatseekers (RMNZ)	6
US Adult Pop Airplay (Billboard)	39
US Hot Rock & Alternative Songs (Billboard)	27

== Certifications ==
Certifications for "Rose-Colored Boy"
Region	Certification	Certified units/sales
United Kingdom (BPI)	Silver	200,000^{‡}
^{‡} Sales+streaming figures based on certification alone.

== Release history ==
Release dates and formats for "Rose-Colored Boy"
Region	Date	Format	Label	Ref.
Worldwide	March 2, 2018	Digital download – radio edit	Atlantic; Fueled by Ramen	
United States	March 27, 2018	Contemporary hit radio	Fueled by Ramen; RRP	
