= After Laughter =

Studio album by Paramore
- Released: May 12, 2017
- Recorded: June – November 2016
- Studios: RCA Studio A (Nashville, Tennessee)
- Genres: New wave; pop rock; synth-pop; power pop; alternative pop
- Length: 42:31
- Label: Fueled by Ramen
- Producers: Justin Meldal-Johnsen; Taylor York

Paramore chronology
The Holiday Sessions (2013)	After Laughter (2017)	This Is Why (2023)

Singles from After Laughter
- 1. "Hard Times" Released: April 19, 2017; 2. "Told You So" Released: May 3, 2017; 3. "Fake Happy" Released: August 29, 2017; 4. "Rose-Colored Boy" Released: March 2, 2018; 5. "Caught in the Middle" Released: June 26, 2018

After Laughter is the fifth studio album by the American rock band Paramore. It was released on May 12, 2017, through Fueled by Ramen, as a follow-up to their 2013 self-titled album. After Laughter was produced by guitarist Taylor York alongside previous collaborator Justin Meldal-Johnsen. It is the band's first album since the return of drummer Zac Farro (who left the band with his brother Josh in 2010) and the departure of former bassist Jeremy Davis (who left the band in 2015). After Laughter represents a complete departure from the pop-punk and alternative rock sound of the band's previous releases and, in direct contrast to its upbeat and vibrant sound, touches on themes of exhaustion, depression and anxiety.

Upon release, After Laughter received critical acclaim from music critics, who praised the band's new sonic direction and the 1980s new wave and synth-pop sound on the album. Several publications featured the album in their year-end lists, including Billboard and Rolling Stone. In 2019, Pitchfork listed it at number 169 in their list of best albums of the decade.

After Laughter was supported by five singles: "Hard Times", released on April 19, 2017; "Told You So", released on May 3, 2017; "Fake Happy", released on August 29, 2017; "Rose-Colored Boy", released on March 2, 2018; and "Caught in the Middle", released on June 26, 2018. The album debuted at number six on the US Billboard 200, marking their third top 10 album on the chart, with 67,000 album-equivalent units.

== Background and recording ==
On January 19, 2016, singer Hayley Williams announced that the band was in the process of writing their fifth album, following up their 2013 self-titled album, Paramore. On June 8, 2016, the band posted a short video of themselves in a studio to their social media, the same month the album recording started. This was preceded by a number of images which all included both former drummer Zac Farro and producer Justin Meldal-Johnsen, leading fans and various media outlets to speculate the return of Farro. On June 17, Farro was featured yet again in a picture uploaded to social media, this time behind a drum set, confirming that he would be recording drums for the album, though he later clarified that he was only recording drums for the album and that he had not rejoined the band as a full member. Despite this, on February 2, 2017, the band announced that Farro would return as the band's official drummer. The album was recorded in Nashville's historic RCA Studio B, marking the first time the group recorded an album in their hometown. It was produced by the band's guitarist Taylor York, and Meldal-Johnsen, both of whom also produced their self-titled record. The recording of the album concluded in November 2016.

In an interview with The New York Times, Williams stated "I didn't even know if we were going to make another record...There was a moment when I didn't even want it to happen. Then it was like, I want it to happen, but I don't know how we're going to do it." Williams was also interviewed by DIY Magazine, where she mentioned "I still feel like we're really green, especially with this record. It felt like there were so many new things to try and so many new feelings about life – you're finally all the way over the hump of being able to deny that you're an adult now. Yeah, this was a crazy record to make."

== Release and promotion ==
On April 19, 2017, the lead single, "Hard Times", was released along with a music video. On the same day, pre-orders of the album were made available, revealing the album title, cover art, track listing, and release date. A European headline tour was later announced via the band's official website, kicking off in Ireland on June 15. Riot Fest also announced that Paramore would be part of the festival's lineup in September. On May 3, the band released a second single from the album, titled "Told You So", along with a music video. On May 10, the album leaked online before its official release. On the day of the album's release, the band announced their third "Parahoy!" cruise, which took place from April 6 to April 10, 2018, sailing from Miami to Nassau, Bahamas. On May 17, the band performed "Hard Times" on Jimmy Kimmel Live!, Following this, on May 25, they performed "Told You So" on The Late Late Show. On August 29, 2017, the band released "Fake Happy" as the third single from the album, On February 5, 2018, a music video directed by Warren Fu for "Rose-Colored Boy" was released, which is also the album's fourth single. On June 26, 2018, a music video for "Caught in the Middle" was released, which also serves as the album's fifth and final single.

== Composition ==
=== Music and lyrics ===
After Laughter is a departure from Paramore's previous material, leaving behind the pop-punk and emo genres of previous releases entirely. Matt Collar from AllMusic described the album's sound as new wave. Ilana Kaplan at Paste characterized the album as 1980s new wave pop. Similarly, Billboard's Chris Payne described it as an "early '80s new wave" album, as well as calling the songs on After Laughter "slick, sun-kissed alternative pop". Marianne Eloise of The Forty Five described the album as synth-pop. Brad Nelson of Spin also described the album as new wave, saying that "it's the band's brightest, most animated album. The sound is crisp, every layer discernible, lacking the blurs and reverberations that constitute traditional rock production and instead drawing from the rhythmic separations that characterize '80s pop and freestyle." Glenn Gamboa from Newsday stated that the band is "pushing deeper into their own pop-rock world," and that the album has "the candy-colored energy of '80s pop built on sleek synths and spiky, Afrobeat-tinged guitars." Pitchfork writer Ryan Dombal categorized the album a "piece of '80s pop-rock," stating "York focuses his inspirations the styles of 1980s rock and pop, conjuring a slicked-back take on fixtures like Talking Heads, Paul Simon, and the Bangles." The Line of Best Fit's Dannii Leivers noted "the band have fully embraced chart-friendly, power pop." According to PopMatters, "[the album] fuses sleek elements of '80s new wave, funk, and synthpop." Punknews.org described the album as an "80s electro-pop album". Eve Barlow from Variety observed "...these tunes builds upon the more ambitious, experimental sounds of radio stalker "Ain't It Fun" off their previous, self-titled LP, leaning on their crossover success."

The album's lyrical content predominantly touches upon themes of exhaustion, depression, and anxiety. NME said the album is a "pop triumph", highlighting the contrast between the "serious sadness" of the lyrics "underneath all the bangers". Similarly, The Guardian called the album a "vibrant record, a contrast to its lyrical themes, which cover masking misery, spiralling depression and the anxiety of ageing, only with a knowing wink." Newsday called the album "a collection of songs about remaining upbeat in the face of adversity that bounce around with." Billboard said "Williams sings about the act of crying on no less than five songs, and there are numerous moments where she could be addressing the unfriendly exit and subsequent legal entanglements of former bassist Jeremy Davis." Spin said the album "observes a different aspect of the subject of survival: the emptiness and pointlessness, and how often it fails to alter the indifferent universe that surrounds and requires it." The Line of Best Fit said "despite all its sunny hooks, After Laughter is a deep album with plenty to say. It's easily the most honest and mature Paramore have sounded yet."

=== Songs and lyrical content ===
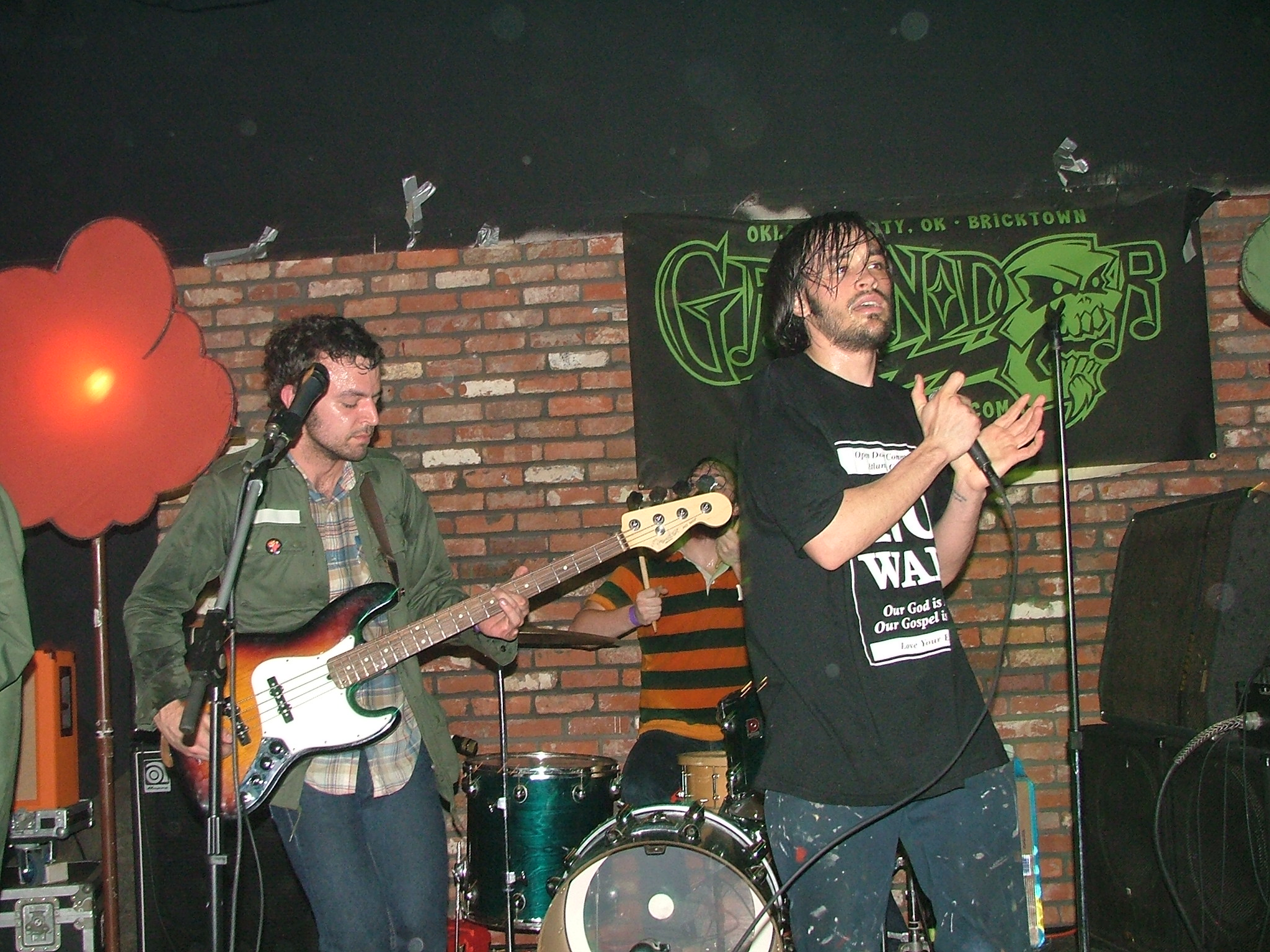
Aaron Weiss of MewithoutYou (right) is featured on "No Friend".

==== Tracks 1–6 ====
After Laughter opens with "Hard Times", a synth-heavy, disco-tinged new wave song about the feeling of going through hard times, and being useless in achieving one's goals. "Rose-Colored Boy" is a synth-pop song that Rolling Stone compared to Cupid & Psyche 85 by pop group Scritti Politti. "Told You So" is a song that has been described as funk-pop, as well as new wave, indie pop and electropop. "Forgiveness" is a "dreamy power ballad" which features "sassy handclaps and hairflicks", which has been compared to pop rock bands Heart, Fleetwood Mac and Haim. NPR said the song is "the band's take on Haim's chiming California soft-rock revival." Spin called it one of the band's best songs, "their gentlest and most buoyant kiss-off". "Fake Happy" starts out as an acoustic dirge that transforms into an "ambitious, funky anthem about everyone masking their sadness." "26" is a string-laden ballad that "sighs into its lush strings". It has been compared to the songs "Misguided Ghosts" and "The Only Exception" from their 2009 album, Brand New Eyes.

==== Tracks 7–12 ====
The seventh track "Pool", described as "aqueous" and "bouncy", is a new wave song that "bathes Williams' voice in crystalline distortion" and "shimmers like a mirage on a blazing day." "Grudges" is "a sweet reflection of Williams' repaired relationship with both Farro brothers", with Zac Farro harmonizing on the track. It has been compared by NME to The Bangles' work, whereas AllMusic compared it to The Cure's "Friday I'm in Love". "Caught in the Middle" is a "ska-inflected" song of persistence and goal setting. According to NME, it is one of the album's nods to their punk past, which they also compared to No Doubt's earlier music. "Idle Worship" is a commentary about fame, with Williams' voice providing even more of a contrast to the stunning acridity of lyrics. York revealed that he sampled wind howling through a building in the UK, then played the sample on a keyboard in the song. The "moody" and "marauding" eleventh track "No Friend" has been described as post-hardcore. It is the only Paramore song to not feature Williams on the vocals. Instead, Aaron Weiss from MewithoutYou is on the vocals, delivering a spoken word monologue buried in a cacophony of York and Farro's dark inversions of the "Idle Worship" riff. The lyrics add metrical detail to the sentiments of "Idle Worship", a song about interpersonal expectations, and the vast distance between one's self-conception and the idea of oneself that exists in the minds of others, Many of its lyrics also make references to past Paramore songs. Several publications referred to it as "the strangest song that's ever made it to a Paramore album." The album closes with "Tell Me How", a tender piano ballad which features a "vaguely tropical pulse and warily confessional words" that allows Williams' voice to curl around and into expressions of anxiety that sound impossible to quiet. It's been characterized as "a soft R&B exploration disguised as a piano ballad" by NPR, who compared it to works by Drake and The Weeknd.

== Title and artwork ==
Regarding the album's title, Williams told iHeartRadio that "After Laughter is about the look on people's faces when they're done laughing. If you watch somebody long enough, there's always this look that comes across their face when they're done smiling, and I always find it really fascinating to wonder what it is that brought them back to reality. So, that's what After Laughter is."

The artwork of After Laughter, which features an impossible trident optical illusion, was designed by Los Angeles–based designer Scott Cleary. It reflects a new sound and direction for the band. Cleary stated:

The band came to me when they were recording the album in LA. We've been friends for a while so we were spending a lot of time together while they were in town from Nashville. They asked me if I'd be interested in doing the album artwork and band re-brand, to which I jumped at the chance. They had some ideas around the 80s vibes of the record, and a few visual references they were feeling. I did the usual "listen to the record, write/draw a bunch of stuff" and came up with the idea of a landscape where colors, shapes and textures would represent sounds and moments on the record...Sonically, the record is very "real" and I wanted the imagery details to have that finishing touch as well.

According to Cleary, his artwork was "the first piece of visual material that accompanied the new record and the band wanted a super-cohesive roll-out", therefore the music video for the lead single "Hard Times" was "very much influenced by the artwork."

== Critical reception ==
Professional ratings
Aggregate scores
Source	Rating
AnyDecentMusic?	7.9/10
Metacritic	82/100
Review scores
Source	Rating
AllMusic	5/5 stars
Consequence	B
Drowned in Sound	8/10
The Guardian	4/5 stars
Newsday	A−
NME	4/5 stars
Pitchfork	7.5/10
Rolling Stone	4/5 stars
Sputnikmusic	4.1/5
USA Today	3.5/4 stars

After Laughter received critical acclaim. At Metacritic, which assigns a normalized rating out of 100 to reviews from mainstream publications, the album received an average score of 82, based on 15 reviews, indicating "universal acclaim".

Matt Collar at AllMusic commented that "much credit here goes to York, who co-wrote all of the songs and whose deft guitar and keyboard make up much of the album's distinct aural character. But of course, Williams still beats at the center of everything, her voice providing the album's warm, exuberant core." Brice Ezell of Consequence stated "Colorful instrumentation and insistent hooks overpower the uneven parts of the band's fifth studio outing". Joe Goggins writing for Drowned in Sound described the band as being as "Musically...free as they've ever sounded [on this album]." In a positive review, Harriet Gibsone at The Guardian said the album is "candy-coated bitterness at its best – may steer them away from the Kerrang! crowd, but one thing remains consistent to Paramore's emo roots – the theatrical mellifluence of internal angst." Dannii Leivers of The Line of Best Fit called it a "deep album with plenty to say" and "one of the best pop albums [of the] year."

Writing for Newsday, Glenn Gamboa praised the album, stating that "the closer Paramore gets to breaking up, the better it gets at finding reasons to stick together," adding that the album "is packed with potential pop hits that only Paramore could deliver. And that's the perfect reason for the group to keep going." Leonie Cooper from Jon Caramanica from The New York Times noted that Paramore are "single-minded again, but not of the same mind as it once was. Ms. Williams and her bandmates, Zac Farro and Taylor York have remade themselves into a 1980s pop-rock outfit: tinny digital percussion, synthesizers and mostly constrained, saccharine singing from Ms. Williams." NME gave the album 4 out of 5 stars, writing: "Catharsis is never usually this joyous, but sometimes smiling through the pain works better than crying." Laura Snapes of The Observer called the album "one of the year's best pop albums."

Iiana Kaplan of Paste said After Laughter is "an undeniably hooky record that strays from its grunge-rock roots and finds the band in a place where they've found the fun in their craft once again." Kaplan also stated that the Williams people love is still around, while noting "Once immersed in the pop-heavy album that is After Laughter, it becomes clear that the less angsty outlook of Paramore is something only surface-level. If you look beneath, it shows Williams battling with herself to make amends ("Forgiveness", "Caught In The Middle") and put on a front to the public ("Fake Happy")." Pitchfork writer Ryan Dombal described it as the band's most "fizzy" album, adding that it "highlights Williams' most existentially despondent musings to date." Maura Johnston of Rolling Stone was positive towards the writing stating, "[the] lyrics evince a weariness that makes [the brightness of the album] seem garishly empty and called the album a "gorgeously produced, hook-studded record." Sputnikmusic staff writer Sowing described the album as the "fresh start" that the self-titled album was meant to be, adding "After Laughter is the first post-2010 Paramore record to truly break form," mentioning "No Friend" and "26" as discography highlights. Patrick Ryan writing for USA Today noted that "Paramore is clearly aiming for more radio-friendly music here, but their deceptively moving lyrics and audacious fusing of genres is what makes it such a rewarding listen."

In a fifth anniversary retrospective review of the album, Yasmine Summan from Alternative Press considered it to be a "saving grace" for the band, and stated "Right now there might not be a Paramore as we know it, but with Zac's return, York's incredible talents and Williams having a place to confront her emotions, this album not only earns its acclaim for its chart-topping successes but is as crucial to the band's growth as Riot! or brand new eyes."

=== Accolades ===
Publication	Accolade	Rank	Ref.
AllMusic	AllMusic's Best Albums of 2017	—N/a	
Billboard	50 Best Albums of 2017	15	
Consequence	Top 50 Albums of 2017	45	
Drowned in Sound	Favourite Albums of 2017	13	
NME	Albums of the Year 2017	20	
Noisey	The 100 Best Albums of 2017	33	
NPR	The 50 Best Albums of 2017	50	
PopMatters	The 60 Best Albums of 2017	52	
Rolling Stone	50 Best Albums of 2017	25	
The Skinny	Top 50 Albums of 2017	14	
Stereogum	The 50 Best Albums of 2017	37	
Time Out New York	The Best Albums of 2017	8	

== Commercial performance ==
After Laughter debuted at number six on the US Billboard 200, making it their third top 10 on the chart, with 67,000 album-equivalent units, of which 53,000 were pure album sales, and was certified gold by the RIAA for shipments of 500,000 albums. It also debuted within the top 10 of seven other countries including Australia, Austria, Canada, Ireland, New Zealand, Scotland and the UK.

== Track listing ==
All tracks are written by Hayley Williams and Taylor York, except where noted.

No.	Title	Writer(s)	Length
1.	"Hard Times"		3:02
2.	"Rose-Colored Boy"	Hayley Williams; Taylor York; Zac Farro	3:32
3.	"Told You So"		3:08
4.	"Forgiveness"		3:40
5.	"Fake Happy"		3:55
6.	"26"		3:40
7.	"Pool"	Williams; York; Farro	3:52
8.	"Grudges"	Williams; York; Farro	3:06
9.	"Caught in the Middle"		3:34
10.	"Idle Worship"		3:18
11.	"No Friend"	Williams; York; Aaron Weiss	3:24
12.	"Tell Me How"		4:20
Total length:			42:31

== Personnel ==
Paramore

- Hayley Williams – lead and background vocals, keyboards, percussion
- Taylor York – guitars, background vocals, programming, keyboards, percussion, marimba, production, additional mixing, engineering
- Zac Farro – drums, background vocals, keyboards, percussion, bells

Additional musicians

- Justin Meldal-Johnsen – bass guitar, keyboards, programming
- Zelly Boo Meldal-Johnsen – additional background vocals (2)
- David Davidson – violin (6)
- Benjamin Kaufman – violin (6)
- Betsy Lamb – viola (6)
- Claire Indie Nunn – cello (6)
- Daniel James – string arrangement (6)
- Aaron Weiss – lead vocals (11)

Technical

- Justin Meldal-Johnsen – production, engineering
- Carlos de la Garza – mixing, engineering
- Mike Schuppan – engineering, additional mixing
- Kevin Boettger – assistant engineering
- Dave Cooley – mastering

Artwork

- Scott Cleary – art direction, design
- Ken Tisuthiwongse – photography for artwork
- Lindsey Byrnes – band photography
- Brian Ranney – packaging production

== Charts ==
=== Weekly charts ===
Weekly chart performance for After Laughter
Chart (2017)	Peak position
Australian Albums (ARIA)	3
Austrian Albums (Ö3 Austria)	10
Belgian Albums (Ultratop Flanders)	24
Belgian Albums (Ultratop Wallonia)	65
Canadian Albums (Billboard)	9
Czech Albums (ČNS IFPI)	57
Dutch Albums (Album Top 100)	17
Finnish Albums (Suomen virallinen lista)	14
French Albums (SNEP)	75
German Albums (Offizielle Top 100)	18
Hungarian Albums (MAHASZ)	36
Irish Albums (IRMA)	4
Italian Albums (FIMI)	14
Mexican Albums (AMPROFON)	10
New Zealand Albums (RMNZ)	7
Norwegian Albums (VG-lista)	24
Portuguese Albums (AFP)	18
Scottish Albums (Official Charts)	4
Spanish Albums (Promusicae)	15
Swedish Albums (Sverigetopplistan)	19
Swiss Albums (Schweizer Hitparade)	29
UK Albums (Official Charts)	4
US Billboard 200	6
US Top Alternative Albums (Billboard)	1
US Top Rock Albums (Billboard)	1

=== Year-end charts ===
Year-end chart performance for After Laughter
Chart (2017)	Position
US Top Current Album Sales (Billboard)	93
US Top Rock Albums (Billboard)	32
US Top Alternative Albums (Billboard)	19

== Certifications ==
Certifications for After Laughter
Region	Certification	Certified units/sales
New Zealand (RMNZ)	Platinum	15,000^{‡}
United Kingdom (BPI)	Gold	100,000^{‡}
United States (RIAA)	Gold	500,000^{‡}
^{‡} Sales+streaming figures based on certification alone.
