= Told You So (Paramore song) =

Single by Paramore

from the album After Laughter
- Released: May 3, 2017
- Studio: RCA Studio B (Nashville, Tennessee)
- Genre: New wave; indie pop; electropop; pop rock; funk
- Length: 3:08
- Label: Fueled by Ramen
- Songwriters: Hayley Williams; Taylor York
- Producers: Justin Meldal-Johnsen; Taylor York

Paramore singles chronology
"Hard Times" (2017)	"Told You So" (2017)	"Fake Happy" (2017)

Music video
- "Told You So" on YouTube

"Told You So" is a song by American rock band Paramore. It was released on May 3, 2017 through Fueled by Ramen as the second single off their fifth studio album After Laughter. It was written by lead vocalist Hayley Williams and guitarist Taylor York and was recorded in the band's hometown, Nashville, Tennessee. A music video for the song was directed by drummer Zac Farro and Aaron Joseph.

== Background ==
In an interview with Zane Lowe's Beats 1 Radio, Hayley Williams stated that the song was one of the first pieces of music that Taylor York sent her. "I had a little thumb-drive, and I would just drive around listening to it, and especially back and forth from Taylor's house. And I would sing little rhythmic sings to myself – they didn't make sense. There were no words. But this is another one that really intimidated me because I was like, 'I have all these melody ideas because there's no so much melody going on and so much rhythm going on. It's so inspiring. But how am I going to fit what I feel into that?' It took a minute."

== Composition ==
Rolling Stone described the song as funk-pop, "over Zac Farro's New Wave drum groove and Taylor York's spidery guitars". Likewise, Nerdist said the song has "a bit of funk bass hops in the background while that same tropical guitar-work we heard in “Hard Times” twirls throughout." Derrick Rossignol of Uproxx called the song a "super fun indie pop-rock tune that borrows from the '80s and sunshine." Similarly, Rock Cellar Magazine described the song as a "shimmery indie-pop gem", while Andrew Trendell at NME characterized the song as a "summer-y electro-pop," with a "rush of tropical rhythms." Setphen Trageser of Nashville Scene categorized it as a "groovy New Wave-y cut". According to MTV, the song "takes some of the '80s-infused riffage we heard on "Hard Times" and runs with it."

== Critical reception ==
Marc Hogan at Pitchfork gave "Told You So" a positive review, stating: "There’s more to "Told You So" than a clever twist on an old phrase. Paramore have faced their share of naysayers as they’ve broadened their sound from its pop-punk origins." Jordan Sargent from Spin also praised the song as "spiky and fluorescent, built around the sort of jagged guitar groove that Paramore have gotten very good at spitting out."

The song was named as Paramore's 10th best song by NME on their list of top 10 Paramore songs.

== Music video ==
The music video was directed by drummer Zac Farro and Aaron Joseph. Farro based the music video on the band’s car rides after recording sessions in L.A. Hayley Williams told The Fader that Farro noticed that her "anxiety and overall state was just a lot more peaceful on those drives," further stating that it made him happy to see her rest for a moment, "It means a lot that they conceptualized a video around a passing moment we had as friends." The band used Farro's actual car for filming, and shot the rest at guitarist Taylor York's house with a bunch of friends. Williams said, "there's darkness and suspense and then there's a sense of unity in the full band shots in the car, where we all wear red and dance together to the music." Anna Gaca of Spin said the video "features the band styled like French robbers inside of a Wes Anderson film."

== Personnel ==
Credits adapted from the album's liner notes.

- Kevin "K-Bo" Boettger – assistant engineer
- Dave Cooley – mastering engineer
- Carlos de la Garza – mixer, engineer
- Zac Farro – drums, bells, keyboards, percussion, background vocals
- Justin Meldal-Johnsen – producer, engineer, bass guitar, keyboards, programming
- Mike Schuppan – engineer, additional mixer
- Hayley Williams – vocals, keyboards, percussion, background vocals
- Taylor York – producer, additional mixer, engineer, guitar, keyboards, marimba, percussion, programming, background vocals

== Charts ==
Chart performance for "Told You So"
Chart (2017)	Peak position
New Zealand Heatseekers (RMNZ)	7
Scottish Singles Sales (Official Charts)	66
UK Singles Sales (OCC)	84
UK Singles Downloads (Official Charts)	84
US Hot Rock & Alternative Songs (Billboard)	16
