= Caught in the Middle (Paramore song) =

Single by Paramore

from the album After Laughter
- Released: June 26, 2018
- Studio: RCA Studio B (Nashville, Tennessee)
- Genre: Pop rock; new wave; synth-pop; ska; reggae
- Length: 3:32
- Label: Fueled by Ramen
- Songwriters: Hayley Williams; Taylor York
- Producers: Justin Meldal-Johnsen; Taylor York

Paramore singles chronology
"Rose-Colored Boy" (2018)	"Caught in the Middle" (2018)	"This Is Why" (2022)

Music video
- "Caught in the Middle" on YouTube

"Caught in the Middle" is a song by American rock band Paramore. It was released on June 26, 2018, through Fueled by Ramen as the fifth and final single off their fifth studio album After Laughter (2017). The track was co-written by lead vocalist Hayley Williams and guitarist Taylor York, and recorded in Nashville, Tennessee.

== Composition ==
The genre of "Caught in the Middle" has been described as pop rock, new wave, synth-pop, ska and reggae. It contains bouncing drums and bass from band members York and Farro, and has been compared sonically to the early work of American rock band No Doubt.

== Music video ==
The music video for "Caught in the Middle" was released on June 26, 2018, and was directed by Computer Team, who worked with the band on previous videos from After Laughter. The video features the band dancing on oranges, and trying to evade various other fruits. This video was intentionally made in VHS-quality. The visuals are an homage to A-ha's music video for "Take On Me".

== Personnel ==
Credits adapted from the album's liner notes.

- Kevin "K-Bo" Boettger – assistant engineer
- Dave Cooley – mastering engineer
- Carlos de la Garza – mixer, engineer
- Zac Farro – drums, bells, keyboards, percussion, background vocals
- Justin Meldal-Johnsen – producer, engineer, bass guitar, keyboards, programming
- Mike Schuppan – engineer, additional mixer
- Hayley Williams – vocals, keyboards, percussion, background vocals
- Taylor York – producer, additional mixer, engineer, guitar, keyboards, marimba, percussion, programming, background vocals
