= Self-Titled Tour =

2013–15 concert tour by Paramore

The Self-Titled Tour
- Tour by Paramore
- Associated album: Paramore
- Start date: February 12, 2013
- End date: May 25, 2015
- No. of shows: 189

Paramore concert chronology
- Brand New Eyes World Tour (2009–12); The Self-Titled Tour (2013–15); After Laughter Tour (2017–18)

Self-Titled Tour was the third world tour by American rock band Paramore. The tour is in support of their fourth studio album Paramore (2013). The tour began in Bangkok on February 12, 2013, and continued through parts of Australia, North America, Europe, and South America.

The tour cycle included Paramore's first headlining show at the Madison Square Garden on November 13, 2013, and was the last touring cycle to feature bassist Jeremy Davis. Hayley Williams stated that Paramore had been planning this tour for a while, and that this tour would be the band's biggest production with its longest setlist.

== 2013 Paramore Tours ==
=== Pre-Album Cycle Shows ===
==== Opening acts ====
- Asia: mewithoutYou
- Sydney: Far Away Stables
- United Kingdom: Charli XCX & Eliza & The Bear

==== Setlist ====
February 12, 2013 – February 21, 2013; April 1, 2013 – April 5, 2013
1. "Now"
2. "That's What You Get"
3. "Born for This"
4. "For a Pessimist, I'm Pretty Optimistic"
5. "Decode"
6. "Renegade"
7. "Pressure"
8. "Careful"
9. "In the Mourning" (including "Landslide" cover)
10. "The Only Exception" (Outro)
11. "Let the Flames Begin"
12. "Fences"
13. "Looking Up"
14. "Ignorance"
15. "Monster"
16. "Brick by Boring Brick"

Encore

17. "Hello Cold World" (Asia & Sydney only)
18. "Still Into You" (London & Paris only)
19. "Matilda" (Alt-J cover, London only)
20. "Misery Business"

Notes

- Now received its live debut at Centerpoint Studio, Bangkok, Thailand
February 23, 2013 – March 4, 2013
1. "Brick by Boring Brick"
2. "That's What You Get"
3. "For a Pessimist, I'm Pretty Optimistic"
4. "Decode"
5. "Renegade"
6. "Pressure"
7. "Careful"
8. "The Only Exception"
9. "Let the Flames Begin" (Outro)
10. "Fences"
11. "Looking Up"
12. "Ignorance"
13. "Monster"
14. "Now"
15. "Misery Business"

Notes

- During the Brisbane Soundwave, Now was the opener and Brick by Boring Brick was the penultimate song instead. Decode and Fences were not played.
- During the Sydney Soundwave, Renegade and Fences were not played
- During the Perth Soundwave, Careful, Let The Flames Begin, Fences, Looking Up, and Now were not played.
March 13, 2013
1. "Brick by Boring Brick"
2. "That's What You Get"
3. "For a Pessimist, I'm Pretty Optimistic"
4. "Decode"
5. "Now"
6. "In the Mourning" (including "Landslide" cover)
7. "The Only Exception"
8. "Let the Flames Begin" (Outro)
9. "Ignorance"
10. "Still Into You"
11. "Misery Business"

Notes

- Still Into You was premiered at this show

==== Tour dates ====
Date	City	Country	Venue
February 12, 2013	Bangkok	Thailand	Centerpoint Studio
February 15, 2013	Pasay	Philippines	Mall of Asia Arena
February 18, 2013	Kuala Lumpur	Malaysia	Stadium Negara
February 21, 2013	Sydney	Australia	Enmore Theatre
February 23, 2013	Brisbane	Australia	RNA Showgrounds ^{[a]}
February 24, 2013	Sydney	Australia	Sydney Olympic Park^{[a]}
March 1, 2013	Melbourne	Australia	Flemington Racecourse^{[a]}
March 2, 2013	Adelaide	Australia	Bonython Park^{[a]}
March 4, 2013	Perth	Australia	Claremont Showground^{[a]}
March 13, 2013	Austin	United States	The Belmont ^{[b]}
April 1, 2013	Paris	France	La Cigale
April 5, 2013	London	England	The Garage

=== 2013 North American Spring Tour ===
==== Opening act ====
- Kitten (April 25, 2013 – May 21, 2013)

==== Setlist ====
April 10, 2013 & April 19, 2013
1. "Still Into You" (acoustic)
2. "That's What You Get" (acoustic)
3. "In the Mourning" (including "Landslide" cover, Hollywood only)
4. "Misery Business" (acoustic)
April 11, 2013
1. "Still Into You"
2. "Now"
3. "Brick by Boring Brick"
4. "That's What You Get"
5. "Misery Business"
April 20, 2013
1. "Interlude: Moving On"
2. "Interlude: I'm Not Angry Anymore"
3. "Interlude: Holiday"
4. "Misery Business" (acoustic)
5. "Daydreaming" (acoustic)
6. "Still Into You" (acoustic)
April 25, 2013 – May 21, 2013
1. "Interlude: Moving On"
2. "Misery Business"
3. "For a Pessimist, I'm Pretty Optimistic"
4. "Decode"
5. "Now"
6. "Renegade"
7. "Pressure"
8. "Ain't It Fun"
9. "The Only Exception"
10. "Let the Flames Begin" (Outro)
11. "Fast in My Car"
12. "Ignorance"
13. "Looking Up"
14. "Whoa"
15. "Anklebiters"
16. "That's What You Get"
17. "Still Into You"

Encore

18. "Hate to See Your Heart Break" (Houston only)
19. "Proof"
20. "Brick by Boring Brick"

Notes

- During the Phoenix, Arizona show, Proof and Ain't It Fun switched places.
- During the Frisco, Texas show, interlude: Moving On, Renegade, Pressure, Ain't It Fun, The Only Exception, Whoa, Anklebiters, and Proof were not played.
- During the Las Vegas, San Francisco, and Denver shows, Renegade was not played.
- During the Camden, New Jersey show, interlude: Moving On, Ain't It Fun, The Only Exception, Whoa, Anklebiters, and Proof were not played.

==== Tour dates ====
Date	City	Country	Venue
April 10, 2013	Hollywood	United States	Hollywood Tower ^{[c]}
April 11, 2013	Hollywood	United States	El Capitan Theatre ^{[d]}
April 19, 2013	Nashville	United States	102.9 The Buzz ^{[e]}
April 20, 2013	Nashville	United States	Grimey's Record Store ^{[f]}
April 25, 2013	Houston	United States	Bayou Music Center
April 27, 2013	Frisco	United States	FC Dallas Stadium ^{[x]}
April 29, 2013	Phoenix	United States	Comerica Theatre
May 1, 2013	Los Angeles	United States	Wiltern Theatre
May 3, 2013	Las Vegas	United States	The Joint
May 4, 2013	San Francisco	United States	The Warfield
May 7, 2013	Denver	United States	The Fillmore
May 9, 2013	Chicago	United States	Chicago Theatre
May 10, 2013	Detroit	United States	The Fillmore Detroit
May 12, 2013	Camden	United States	Susquehanna Bank Center ^{[g]}
May 13, 2013	Toronto	Canada	Sound Academy
May 15, 2013	Boston	United States	House of Blues
May 16, 2013	New York City	United States	Hammerstein Ballroom
May 18, 2013	Silver Spring	United States	The Fillmore
May 20, 2013	Charlotte	United States	The Fillmore
May 21, 2013	Atlanta	United States	The Tabernacle

=== European Festival & Concert Tour ===
==== Setlist ====
May 26, 2013 – June 30, 2013
1. "Interlude: Moving On"
2. "Misery Business"
3. "For a Pessimist, I'm Pretty Optimistic"
4. "Decode"
5. "Now"
6. "Renegade"
7. "Pressure"
8. "Ain't It Fun"
9. "The Only Exception"
10. "Let the Flames Begin" (Outro)
11. "Fast in My Car"
12. "Ignorance"
13. "Looking Up"
14. "Whoa"
15. "Anklebiters"
16. "That's What You Get"
17. "Still Into You"

Encore

18. "Proof"
19. "Brick by Boring Brick"

Notes

- This setlist is the most representative of the whole tour. This setlist was used at the Luxembourg, Czech Republic, Germany, Denmark, and Norway shows. All other shows used a variation of this setlist.

==== Tour dates ====
Date	City	Country	Venue
May 26, 2013	Derry	Northern Ireland	Radio 1's Big Weekend ^{[h]}
June 5, 2013	Warsaw	Poland	Impact Festival
June 7, 2013	Nürburg	Germany	Rock Am Ring
June 9, 2013	Nuremberg	Germany	Rock Im Park
June 10, 2013	Milan	Italy	Ippodromo del Galoppo
June 13, 2013	Luxembourg	Luxembourg	Rockhal
June 14, 2013	Landgraaf	Netherlands	Pinkpop Festival
June 16, 2013	Nickelsdorf	Austria	Nova Rock Festival
June 17, 2013	Budapest	Hungary	Budapest Park
June 19, 2013	Prague	Czech Republic	Lucerna
June 21, 2013	Paris	France	Stade de France ^{[i]}
June 22, 2013	Hamburg	Germany	Docks
June 24, 2013	Copenhagen	Denmark	Vega
June 25, 2013	Oslo	Norway	Sentrum Scene
June 27, 2013	Norrköping	Sweden	Bråvalla Festival
June 29, 2013	Helsinki	Finland	Rock the Beach Festival
June 30, 2013	Moscow	Russia	Park Live Festival

=== 2013 Latin American Tour ===
==== Opening acts ====
- Mexico: Twenty One Pilots
- Argentina: La Carga
- Chile: Polar

==== Setlist ====
July 15, 2013 – August 4, 2013
1. "Interlude: Moving On"
2. "Misery Business"
3. "For a Pessimist, I'm Pretty Optimistic"
4. "Decode"
5. "Now"
6. "Renegade"
7. "Pressure"
8. "Ain't It Fun"
9. "The Only Exception"
10. "Let the Flames Begin" (Outro)
11. "Fast in My Car"
12. "Ignorance"
13. "Looking Up"
14. "Whoa"
15. "Anklebiters"
16. "That's What You Get"
17. "Still Into You"

Encore

18. "Proof"
19. "Brick by Boring Brick"

==== Tour dates ====
Date	City	Country	Venue
July 15, 2013	Mexico City	Mexico	Palacio de los Deportes
July 18, 2013	Santiago	Chile	Movistar Arena
July 20, 2013	Buenos Aires	Argentina	Microestadio Malvinas Argentinas
July 25, 2013	Rio de Janeiro	Brazil	HSBC Arena
July 26, 2013	Belo Horizonte	Brazil	Arena Expominas
July 28, 2013	Brasília	Brazil	Arena Iguatemi
July 30, 2013	São Paulo	Brazil	Espaço das Americas
July 31, 2013	São Paulo	Brazil	Espaço das Americas
August 2, 2013	Curitiba	Brazil	Master Hall
August 4, 2013	Porto Alegre	Brazil	Pepsi on Stage

=== 2013 European September Tour ===
==== Opening acts ====
- Walking On Cars (Dublin)
- MakeBelieve (Amsterdam)
- Fenech-Soler (Mainland Europe & iTunes Festival)
- Charli XCX (United Kingdom)
- Eliza and the Bear (United Kingdom)

==== Setlist ====
September 2, 2013 – September 28, 2013
1. "Grow Up"
2. "Fast In My Car"
3. "That's What You Get"
4. "Decode"
5. "Ignorance"
6. "Interlude: I'm Not Angry Anymore"
7. "Now"
8. "Daydreaming"
9. "When It Rains"
10. "Last Hope"
11. "Brick By Boring Brick"
12. "Interlude: Holiday"
13. "crushcrushcrush"
14. "Ain't It Fun"
15. "The Only Exception"
16. "In the Mourning" / "Landslide"
17. "Pressure"
18. "Misery Business"

Encore

19. "Part II"
20. "Interlude: Moving On"
21. "Still into You"

==== Tour dates ====
Date	City	Country	Venue
September 2, 2013	Dublin	Ireland	The O2
September 4, 2013	Camden Town	England	iTunes Festival
September 5, 2013	Amsterdam	Netherlands	Heineken Music Hall
September 7, 2013	Paris	France	Zénith de Paris
September 8, 2013	Zürich	Switzerland	Komplex
September 10, 2013	Bologna	Italy	Estragon Club
September 11, 2013	Munich	Germany	Kesselhaus
September 13, 2013	Berlin	Germany	Columbiahalle
September 14, 2013	Bremen	Germany	Pier 2
September 16, 2013	Düsseldorf	Germany	Mitsubishi Electric Halle
September 18, 2013	Neu Isenburg	Germany	Hugenottenhalle
September 20, 2013	Manchester	England	Manchester Arena
September 21, 2013	Cardiff	Wales	Motorpoint Arena Cardiff
September 23, 2013	Birmingham	England	LG Arena
September 24, 2013	Nottingham	England	Capital FM Arena Nottingham
September 27, 2013	London	England	Wembley Arena
September 28, 2013	London	England	Wembley Arena

=== The Self-Titled Tour ===
==== Opening acts ====
- Hellogoodbye (All Dates)
- Metric (United States)
- Classified (Vancouver)
- Lights (Montreal & Toronto)

==== Setlist ====
October 15, 2013 – November 27, 2013
1. "Grow Up"
2. "Fast In My Car"
3. "That's What You Get"
4. "Decode"
5. "Ignorance"
6. "Interlude: I'm Not Angry Anymore"
7. "Now"
8. "Daydreaming"
9. "When It Rains"
10. "Last Hope"
11. "Brick By Boring Brick"
12. "Interlude: Holiday"
13. "crushcrushcrush"
14. "Ain't It Fun"
15. "The Only Exception"
16. "In the Mourning" / "Landslide"
17. "Pressure"
18. "Misery Business"

Encore

19. "Part II"
20. "Interlude: Moving On"
21. "Still into You"

Notes

- During the Atlanta show, Pressure and Part II were not played.

==== Tour dates ====
Date	City	Country	Venue
October 15, 2013	Seattle	United States	KeyArena
October 16, 2013	Vancouver	Canada	PNE Forum
October 18, 2013	San Jose	United States	SAP Center at San Jose
October 19, 2013	Anaheim	United States	Honda Center
October 22, 2013	Fresno	United States	Save Mart Center
October 23, 2013	San Diego	United States	Viejas Arena
October 26, 2013	Grand Prairie	United States	Verizon Theatre at Grand Prairie
October 27, 2013	The Woodlands	United States	Cynthia Woods Mitchell Pavilion
October 29, 2013	Independence	United States	Independence Events Center
October 30, 2013	St. Louis	United States	Fox Theatre
November 1, 2013	Austin	United States	Austin360 Amphitheater
November 2, 2013	New Orleans	United States	City Park ^{[j]}
November 4, 2013	Sunrise	United States	BB&T Center
November 5, 2013	Orlando	United States	UCF Convocation Center
November 8, 2013	Camden	United States	Susquehanna Bank Center
November 9, 2013	Fairfax	United States	Patriot Center
November 11, 2013	Bethlehem	United States	Sands Casino Resort Bethlehem
November 13, 2013	New York City	United States	Madison Square Garden
November 15, 2013	Worcester	United States	DCU Center
November 17, 2013	Uncasville	United States	Mohegan Sun Arena
November 18, 2013	Montreal	Canada	Bell Centre
November 20, 2013	Toronto	Canada	Air Canada Centre Theatre
November 21, 2013	Auburn Hills	United States	The Palace of Auburn Hills
November 23, 2013	Saint Paul	United States	Roy Wilkins Auditorium
November 24, 2013	Chicago	United States	UIC Pavilion
November 26, 2013	Nashville	United States	Bridgestone Arena
November 27, 2013	Duluth	United States	Arena at Gwinnett Center

=== December Radio Shows ===
==== Setlist ====
December 4, 2013 – December 16, 2013
1. "Misery Business"
2. "Ain't It Fun"
3. "The Only Exception"
4. "Still Into You"
December 13, 2013
1. "The Only Exception" (acoustic)
2. "Still Into You" (acoustic)

==== Tour dates ====
Date	City	Country	Venue
December 4, 2013	Philadelphia	United States	Wells Fargo Center ^{[k]}
December 6, 2013	Los Angeles	United States	Staples Center ^{[k]}
December 8, 2013	Everett	United States	Comcast Arena ^{[l]}
December 9, 2013	Chicago	United States	United Center ^{[m]}
December 13, 2013	New York City	United States	Hammerstein Ballroom ^{[n]}
December 13, 2013	New York City	United States	Madison Square Garden ^{[n]}
December 14, 2013	Boston	United States	TD Garden ^{[o]}
December 16, 2013	Washington, D.C.	United States	Verizon Center ^{[p]}

End of Year 2013 Concert Gross

Pollstar released their yearly concert tour numbers for 2013. In North America, The Self-Titled Tour came in as the 132nd best selling tour with $6.6 million in total gross, with each show earning an average of about $157,000. Internationally, the tour came in as the 99th best selling tour that year, grossing $14.6 million in total sales, with each show earning an average of about $200,000.

== 2014 Paramore Tours ==
=== 2014 Australian / New Zealand Tour ===
==== Opening acts ====
- You Me At Six (Australia Only)
- Twenty One Pilots

==== Tour dates ====
Date	City	Country	Venue
January 9, 2014	Brisbane	Australia	Brisbane Entertainment Centre
January 11, 2014	Sydney	Australia	Allphones Arena
January 12, 2014	Melbourne	Australia	Myer Music Bowl
January 14, 2014	Adelaide	Australia	Adelaide Entertainment Centre
January 16, 2014	Perth	Australia	Perth Arena
January 19, 2014	Auckland	New Zealand	Vector Arena

=== One-Off Shows ===
==== Opening acts ====
- Tegan and Sara (Puerto Rico)

==== Tour dates ====
Date	City	Country	Venue
February 1, 2014	New York City	United States	Pier 40
March 6, 2014	Tampa	United States	Seminole Hard Rock Hotel and Casino
March 14, 2014	San Juan	Puerto Rico	Coliseo de Puerto Rico José Miguel Agrelot
May 9, 2014	Chula Vista	United States	Channel 93.3 Kickoff Concert
May 10, 2014	Carson	United States	Wango Tango
May 31, 2014	Atlantis	The Bahamas	Atlantis Resort^{[q]}
August 22, 2014	Reading	England	Reading and Leeds Festivals^{[r]}
August 23, 2014	Leeds	England	Reading and Leeds Festivals^{[r]}
September 20, 2014	Las Vegas	United States	MGM Grand^{[s]}
November 1, 2014	São Paulo	Brazil	Campo de Marte ^{[t]}
November 8, 2014	Rio de Janeiro	Brazil	Praça da Apoteose ^{[t]}

=== Parahoy! ===
==== Support acts ====
- Tegan & Sara
- New Found Glory
- Shiny Toy Guns
- mewithoutYou
- Bad Rabbits
- Reuben Wu
- Doug Benson

==== Tour dates ====
Date	City	Country	Venue
March 7–11, 2014	Miami–Great Stirrup Cay	United States	Norwegian Pearl

=== Monumentour ===
==== Opening acts ====
- Fall Out Boy (co-headliner)
- New Politics
- Bad Suns (St. Paul only)

==== Tour dates ====
Date	City	Country	Venue
June 19, 2014	Hartford	United States	Xfinity Theatre
June 21, 2014	Wantagh	United States	Nikon at Jones Beach Theater
June 22, 2014	Mansfield	United States	Xfinity Center
June 24, 2014	Saratoga Springs	United States	Saratoga Performing Arts Center
June 25, 2014	Toronto	Canada	Molson Canadian Amphitheatre
June 27, 2014	Camden	United States	Susquehanna Bank Center
June 28, 2014	Holmdel	United States	PNC Bank Arts Center
June 30, 2014	Gilford	United States	Bank of New Hampshire Pavilion
July 2, 2014	Darien	United States	Darien Lake Performing Arts Center
July 3, 2014	Burgettstown	United States	First Niagara Pavilion
July 5, 2014	Milwaukee	United States	Summerfest
July 6, 2014	Maryland Heights	United States	Verizon Wireless Amphitheatre
July 8, 2014	Clarkston	United States	DTE Energy Music Theatre
July 9, 2014	Noblesville	United States	Klipsch Music Center
July 11, 2014	Tinley Park	United States	First Midwest Bank Amphitheatre
July 12, 2014	Cincinnati	United States	Bunbury Music Festival
July 18, 2014	Columbia	United States	Merriweather Post Pavilion
July 19, 2014	Hershey	United States	Hersheypark Stadium
July 22, 2014	Raleigh	United States	Walnut Creek Amphitheatre
July 23, 2014	Charlotte	United States	PNC Music Pavilion
July 25, 2014	West Palm Beach	United States	Cruzan Amphitheatre
July 26, 2014	Tampa	United States	MidFlorida Credit Union Amphitheatre
July 29, 2014	Virginia Beach	United States	Farm Bureau Live
July 30, 2014	Atlanta	United States	Aaron's Amphitheatre
August 1, 2014	The Woodlands	United States	Cynthia Woods Mitchell Pavilion
August 2, 2014	Austin	United States	Austin360 Amphitheater
August 7, 2014	Albuquerque	United States	Isleta Amphitheater
August 8, 2014	Phoenix	United States	Ak-Chin Pavilion
August 10, 2014	Oklahoma City	United States	Zoo Amphitheatre
August 12, 2014	Morrison	United States	Red Rocks Amphitheatre
August 13, 2014	Orem	United States	UCCU Center
August 16, 2014	Irvine	United States	Verizon Wireless Amphitheatre
August 17, 2014	Concord	United States	Sleep Train Pavilion
August 28, 2014	Saint Paul	United States	Minnesota State Fair
August 30, 2014	Toledo	United States	Huntington Center
August 31, 2014	Scranton	United States	Toyota Pavilion

== 2015 Paramore Tours ==
=== One-Off Show ===
==== Setlist ====
February 23, 2015
1. "Still Into You"
2. "That's What You Get"
3. "For A Pessimist, I'm Pretty Optimistic
4. "Ignorance"
5. "Decode"
6. "The Only Exception"
7. "Proof"
8. "Brick By Boring Brick"
9. "Hate to See Your Heart Break"
10. "Last Hope"
11. "Misery Business"
12. "Ain't It Fun"

==== Tour dates ====
Date	City	Country	Venue
February 23, 2015	New York City	United States	Hilton Conrad New York

=== Writing the Future ===
==== Opening act ====
- Copeland
- Chromeo *Annapolis Only

==== Setlist ====
April 24, 2015 – May 25, 2015
1. Daydreaming
2. Proof
3. That's What You Get
4. Be Alone
5. Playing God
6. Never Let This Go
7. Decode
8. Part II
9. Hate to See Your Heart Break
10. Misguided Ghosts
11. The Only Exception
12. Franklin
13. Still Into You
14. (One of Those) Crazy Girls
15. I Caught Myself
16. Miracle
17. Careful
18. Tell Me It's Okay
19. Misery Business
20. Ain't It Fun
21. Future

Notes

- The first two shows, Annapolis and Ewing, did not include 'Franklin'

==== Tour dates ====
Date	City	Country	Venue
April 24, 2015	Annapolis	United States	Alumni Hall
April 25, 2015	Ewing	United States	The College of New Jersey
April 27, 2015	Augusta	United States	Bell Auditorium
April 28, 2015	Clearwater	United States	Ruth Eckerd Hall
April 30, 2015	West Palm Beach	United States	SunFest ^{[u]}
May 2, 2015	Memphis	United States	Beale Street Music Festival ^{[v]}
May 3, 2015	Rosemont	United States	Rosemont Theatre
May 5, 2015	Boston	United States	Citi Wang Theatre
May 6, 2015	New York City	United States	Beacon Theatre
May 8, 2015	Atlantic City	United States	Borgata Event Center
May 9, 2015	Uncasville	United States	Mohegan Sun Arena
May 11, 2015	Baltimore	United States	Meyerhoff Theatre
May 12, 2015	Louisville	United States	The Louisville Palace
May 14, 2015	New Orleans	United States	Saenger Theatre
May 15, 2015	Gulf Shores	United States	Hangout Festival ^{[w]}
May 17, 2015	Nashville	United States	Grand Ole Opry House
May 19, 2015	Grand Prairie	United States	Verizon Theatre at Grand Prairie
May 20, 2015	El Paso	United States	Abraham Chavez Theatre
May 22, 2015	San Diego	United States	San Diego State University Open Air Theatre
May 23, 2015	Los Angeles	United States	Dolby Theatre
May 25, 2015	Portland	United States	Arlene Schnitzer Concert Hall

== Box office score data ==
Venue	City	Tickets sold / available	Gross revenue
The Joint	Las Vegas	4,158 / 4,158 (100%)	$153,805
Chicago Theatre	Chicago	3,479 / 3,479 (100%)	$120,135
The Palace of Auburn Hills	Auburn Hills	6,267 / 7,200	$157,981
Patriot Center	Fairfax	5,501 / 6,742	$227,735
Heineken Music Hall	Amsterdam	6,264 / 6,264(100%)	$234,900
Stade de France	Paris	150,936 / 150,936 (100%)	$12,311,700
Palacio de los Deportes	Mexico City	17,952 / 18,091 (99%)	$622,417
Manchester Arena	Manchester	11,380 / 13,287	$503,605
Espaço das Americas	São Paulo	8,640 / 11,000 (with one other show)	$589,943 (with one other show)
Movistar Arena	Santiago	9,016 / 13,100	$532,157
HSBC Arena	Rio de Janeiro	5,142 / 6,500	$368,412
Master Hall	Curitiba	3,719 / 4,200	$215,953
Arena Expominas	Belo Horizonte	3,573 / 4,500	$212,754
Arena Iguatemi	Brasília	2,626 / 5,000	$187,134
Pepsi On Stage	Porto Alegre	1,457 / 1,457 (100%)	$161,450
Save Mart Center	Fresno	4,662 / 5,392	$124,425
Independence Events Center	Kansas City	2,180 / 5,116	$92,769
Fox Theatre	St. Louis	1,974 / 4,190	$81,940
Verizon Theatre at Grand Prairie	Dallas	3,967 / 6,091	$162,156
Austin360 Amphitheater	Austin	5,378 / 7,451	$159,428
Mohegan Sun Arena	Uncasville	5,200 / 6,116	$182,000
Bell Centre	Montreal	2,970 / 3,621	$123,634
Bridgestone Arena	Nashville	5,654 / 8,159	$201,271
Madison Square Garden	New York City	10,437 / 12,157	$453,596
Brisbane Entertainment Centre	Brisbane	5,931 / 6,651	$419,081
Perth Arena	Perth	4,412 / 4,715	$311,839

== Notes ==
- a This show is a part of the Soundwave
- b This show is a part of the South by Southwest
- c This show is a part of 98.7 FM's "Penthouse" concert series
- d This show is a part of Jimmy Kimmel Live!'s concert series
- e This show is a part of 102.9 The Buzz's artist sessions
- f This show is a part of Grimey's Record Store Day festivities
- g This show is a part of the WRFF Radio 104.5 6th Birthday Show
- h This show is a part of the Radio 1's Big Weekend 2013
- i This show is a part of supporting Muse on their The 2nd Law Tour
- j This show is a part of the Voodoo Experience festival
- k This show is a part of the WIOQ Q102 Jingle Ball 2013 Holiday Show
- l This show is a part of the KBKS-FM 106.1 KISS FM Jingle Ball 2013 Holiday Show
- m This show is a part of the WKSC-FM 103.5 KISS FM Jingle Ball 2013 Holiday Show
- n This show is a part of the WHTZ Z100 Jingle Ball 2013 Holiday Show
- o This show is a part of the WXKS-FM Kiss 108 Jingle Ball 2013 Holiday Show
- p This show is a part of the Hot 99.5 Jingle Ball 2013 Holiday Show
- q This show is a part of the Cartoon Network Celebrates Summer at Atlantis event
- r This show is a part of the Reading and Leeds Festivals
- s This show is a part of the iHeartRadio Music Festival
- t This show is a part of the Circuito Banco do Brasil Festival
- u This show is a part of SunFest
- v This show is a part of the Beale Street Music Festival
- w This show is a part of the Hangout Festival
- x This show is a part of the Hangout Festival
- x This show is a part of 102.1 The Edge's Edgefest

Cancellations and rescheduled shows

May 6, 2013	Salt Lake City	The Great Saltair	Vocalist, Hayley Williams, was feeling unwell.
December 18, 2013	Tampa	Tampa Bay Times Forum	Band cancelled appearance due to scheduling conflicts and a last minute appearance on The Voice. Rescheduled for March 6, 2014.	This concert was a part of the WFLZ-FM 93.3 FLZ Jingle Ball 2013 Holiday Show.
January 21, 2014	Christchurch	CBS Arena	Band cancelled appearance due to scheduling conflicts.
August 4, 2014	Corpus Christi	Concrete Street Amphitheatre	Vocalist, Hayley Williams, was feeling unwell.
August 5, 2014	Dallas	Gexa Energy Pavilion	Vocalist, Hayley Williams, was feeling unwell.
