= Brand New Eyes World Tour =

2009–12 concert tour by Paramore

- Tour by Paramore
- Promotional poster for the Honda Civic Tour
- Associated album: Brand New Eyes
- Start date: September 29, 2009
- End date: August 25, 2012
- No. of shows: 81 in North America; 48 in Europe; 17 in Oceania; 12 in Asia; 10 in South America; 1 in Caribbean; 169 total

Paramore concert chronology
- The Final Riot! Tour (2008); Brand New Eyes World Tour (2009–12); The Self-Titled Tour (2013–15)

Brand New Eyes World Tour was a series of concert tours by the American rock band Paramore, touring North America, Europe, Asia, Oceania, South America, and the Caribbean.

== Tour ==
Paramore announced the 2009 North American Tour promoting Brand New Eyes on their official site, with The Swellers and Paper Route joining them as opening acts. The first show of the tour was played at a packed Fox Theater in Pomona, California, on September 29, 2009, the day of the album's release. During "Decode", Williams lost her voice and the two remaining songs in the setlist were played instrumentally. The tour, which was supposed to run from September 29 to November 1, was officially postponed on October 2 due to a case of laryngitis for singer Hayley Williams, but resumed on October 10 in Chicago and wrapped up in Los Angeles on November 11. The band kicked off their 2009 European Tour in Helsinki, Finland, on November 29, which ran until December 18 with Paper Route, You Me at Six, and Now, Now Every Children supporting all UK tour dates.

In February 2010, Paramore kicked off their 2010 shows with the Pacific Rim Tour, which first played in Japan before travelling to Australia, New Zealand, Singapore, and the Philippines. Prior to kicking off their shows in Australia, they performed in the Australian Soundwave Festival along with other bands including You Me at Six, Taking Back Sunday, All Time Low, and Alexisonfire. In April and May, the band performed the 2010 American Spring Tour, before their one-off concerts in Bangor, Wales, and Irvine, California, on May 22 and June 5 respectively. The 2010 European Summer Tour took place between June 18 and July 2, and included Paramore opening for Green Day in Dublin, Ireland, and Paris, France, on June 23 and 26 respectively. They briefly extended the European Summer Tour with shows in Leeds and Reading, England, on August 28 and 29 that same year.

Between July and September 2010, the band headlined the Honda Civic Tour, spanning 30 shows across 21 US states. In October, Paramore returned to Australia and New Zealand with their second Pacific Rim Tour of 2010, and additionally performed in Kuala Lumpur, Malaysia, on October 19. The 2010 European Tour took place in the UK and Ireland in November. On November 23, the band performed in Kuwait City, Kuwait, before ending their 2010 touring schedule with four shows in the U.S. in December comprising the American Winter Tour. In February and March 2011, the band played a South American Tour, after which they officially took a break to write for their next album.

=== Honda Civic Tour Show ===
The Honda Civic tour featured the biggest production the band had had thus far. The stage was constructed of three ramps leading up to a platform behind the drum set, with six large video screens behind that.

The show began with a large black curtain concealing the stage while the band played an instrumental with spotlights revealing the silhouettes of the band. Upon the ending of the introductory instrumentals, Paramore began playing "Ignorance" as the curtain simultaneously dropped, the video screens flashing the band's logo during the intro, as the intro progressed the video screen changed to images of light bulbs (similar to the song's music video) during the intro, light bulbs also swung down from the top of the stage, continuing to swing throughout the song. The band then played "Feeling Sorry" as the video screens each showed a live feed of each member of the band performing during the choruses, at the end of the bridge the band would stop playing and Hayley would greet the crowd and welcome them to the tour. After playing "That's What You Get" and "Emergency" the band played "Playing God" as the video screens showed images of picture frames, the same picture frames on the back of Brand New Eyes and the song's single cover. After that they played Careful, as images of the Brand New Eyes butterfly flashed during the chorus, they then continued with their hit-single "Decode" as the video screen showed the band running through the forest with fireworks and flares, the video has been described as a part-two to the song's music video. After that Hayley Williams and Josh Farro moved to stage left and performed an acoustic cover of Loretta Lynn's "You Ain't Women Enough." After that, a red couch (similar to the one on the cover of All We Know is Falling) and a small lamp were brought out and the band performed a three-song acoustic set, during this the light bulbs from Ignorance were brought down again to illuminate the stage. After that the band returned with "Let the Flames Begin" while the video screens showed images of open hands during the 'Oh Father' outro. They then performed "Crushcrushcrush" and "Pressure " stopping in the bridge during "Pressure" for Hayley to introduce all the band members, and for Josh to introduce Hayley. They then performed "Looking Up" while each of the video screens showed lyrics to the song and each of the band members daily lives, at the end of the song all the members came together to ride bikes as the split-screens faded away. They then ended their main set with their biggest hit "The Only Exception" as pyrotechnics were used during the last chorus of the song. The band then exited and come back for an encore, starting with "Brick By Boring Brick" while the video screens showed various images, including deserts, snakes, the Brand New Eyes butterfly, and hot air balloons. After "Brick" the band concluded their set with their breakthrough song "Misery Business" as flashing images of the "Riot!" logo filled the video screens, during the bridge Williams would let one, or sometimes various fans on stage to sing the rest of the song or sometimes play guitar, and as the last chorus came in confetti cannons were shot towards the crowd. The set concluded with the video screen showing Paramore's logo and the band bowing then leaving the stage. They used the same production for their Oceania and UK tours.

== 2009 Paramore Tours ==
=== Fall Tour ===
Paramore, Fall Tour 09.

==== Opening acts ====
- Paper Route
- The Swellers (North America)
- You Me at Six (Europe)
- Now Now Every Children (Europe)
- AFI (Ulalume Festival at Merriweather Post Pavilion)
- Dead by Sunrise (Ulalume Festival at Merriweather Post Pavilion)
- Kid Cudi (Ulalume Festival at Merriweather Post Pavilion)

==== Setlist ====
Pomona
- Final two songs in setlist played instrumentally. The setlist was cut short due to Hayley Williams lost her voice (laryngitis).
1. Intro
2. Ignorance
3. I Caught Myself
4. That's What You Get
5. Looking Up
6. Emergency
7. crushcrushcrush
8. Turn It Off
9. Conspiracy
10. Where The Lines Overlap
11. Decode
12. Misery Business*
13. Miracle Outro*
Ulalume Festival
1. Intro
2. Ignorance
3. I Caught Myself
4. That's What You Get
5. Looking Up
6. Emergency
7. crushcrushcrush
8. Here We Go Again
9. Careful
10. Where The Lines Overlap
11. Decode

Encore:

1. Misery Business
2. Brick by Boring Brick
North America
1. Intro
2. Ignorance
3. I Caught Myself
4. That's What You Get
5. Looking Up
6. Emergency
7. crushcrushcrush
8. Turn It Off
9. Here We Go Again (sometimes with snippet of At The Drive-In's One Armed Scissor)
10. The Only Exception (Nashville Only)
11. Careful
12. Conspiracy
13. Where The Lines Overlap
14. Decode
15. Miracle Outro (Only played at some shows)

Encore:

1. You Ain't Woman Enough (To Take My Man) (Loretta Lynn cover) (Acoustic) (only in Nashville)
2. Misguided Ghosts
3. Misery Business
4. Brick by Boring Brick
Europe
1. Intro
2. Ignorance
3. I Caught Myself
4. That's What You Get
5. Looking Up
6. Emergency
7. crushcrushcrush
8. Turn It Off
9. The Only Exception
10. Pressure
11. Careful
12. Where The Lines Overlap
13. Decode
14. Miracle Outro (Only played at some shows)
15. My Heart (Only played at Wembley Arena, London)

Encore:

1. Misguided Ghosts
2. Misery Business (with Mariachi intro in Glasgow, Birmingham, Brighton and London)
3. Brick by Boring Brick

==== Tour dates ====
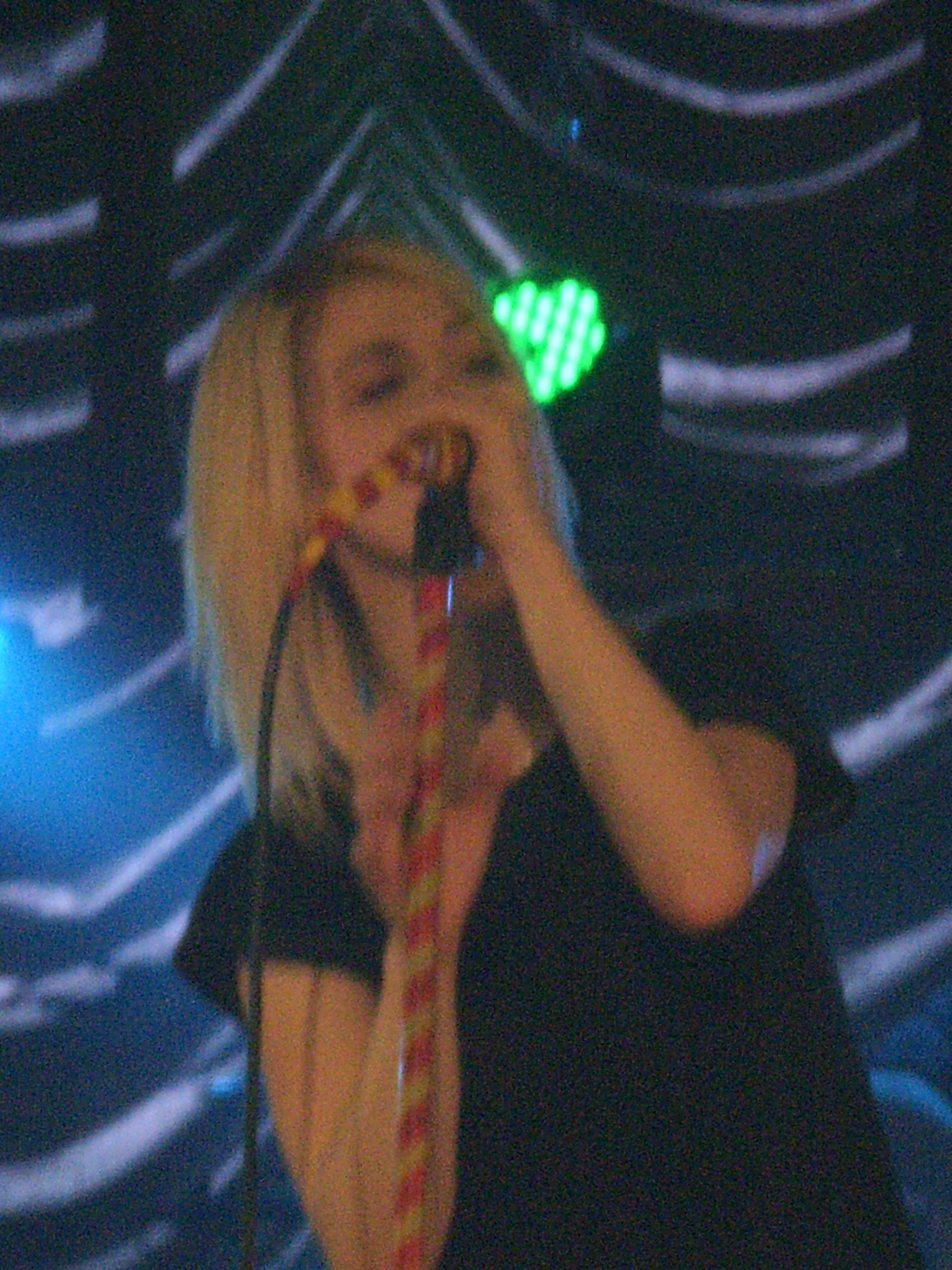
Williams with Paramore performing at the Brighton Centre, Brighton, UK on December 17, 2009.

Date	City	Country	Venue
North America
September 29, 2009	Pomona	United States	Pomona Fox Theater
October 10, 2009	Chicago	United States	House of Blues
October 11, 2009	Detroit	United States	The Fillmore Detroit
October 15, 2009	Toronto	Canada	Kool Haus
October 16, 2009	Montclair	United States	Wellmont Theatre
October 17, 2009	Philadelphia	United States	Electric Factory
October 19, 2009	Boston	United States	House of Blues
October 21, 2009	New York City	United States	Hammerstein Ballroom
October 23, 2009	Columbia	United States	Merriweather Post Pavilion^{[a]}
October 24, 2009	Norfolk	United States	Norva Theatre
October 26, 2009	Lake Buena Vista	United States	House of Blues
October 27, 2009	Atlanta	United States	The Tabernacle
November 1, 2009	Nashville	United States	Ryman Auditorium
November 3, 2009	St. Louis	United States	The Pageant
November 4, 2009	Kansas City	United States	Uptown Theater
November 6, 2009	Saint Paul	United States	Roy Wilkins Auditorium
November 8, 2009	Denver	United States	Fillmore Auditorium
November 10, 2009	San Francisco	United States	The Warfield
November 11, 2009	Los Angeles	United States	Hollywood Palladium
Europe
November 29, 2009	Helsinki	Finland	Helsinki Ice Hall
November 30, 2009	Stockholm	Sweden	Arenan
December 1, 2009	Copenhagen	Denmark	K.B. Hallen
December 3, 2009	Hamburg	Germany	Docks
December 4, 2009	Berlin	Germany	Columbiahalle
December 6, 2009	Cologne	Germany	Palladium
December 7, 2009	Paris	France	Casino de Paris
December 8, 2009	Tilburg	Netherlands	013
December 10, 2009	Glasgow	Scotland	SECC
December 11, 2009	Birmingham	England	National Indoor Arena
December 12, 2009	Dublin	Ireland	The O2
December 14, 2009	Cardiff	Wales	Cardiff International Arena
December 16, 2009	Manchester	England	MEN Arena
December 17, 2009	Brighton	England	Brighton Centre
December 18, 2009	London	England	Wembley Arena

a This concert is a part of the mtvU Ulalume Festival

== 2010 Paramore Tours ==
=== Pacific Run ===
==== Opening acts ====
- You Me at Six (Australia)

==== Setlist ====
Asia and Oceania
1. Ignorance
2. Crushcrushcrush
3. That's What You Get
4. Looking Up
5. Careful
6. Let The Flames Begin
7. Never Let This Go
8. The Only Exception
9. Pressure
10. For A Pessimist, I'm Pretty Optimistic
11. Where The Lines Overlap
12. Decode

Encore:

1. Misery Business
2. Brick By Boring Brick
Soundwave Festival
1. Ignorance
2. Crushcrushcrush
3. That's What You Get
4. Looking Up
5. Careful
6. Never Let This Go (only in Adelaide and Perth)
7. The Only Exception (only in Adelaide and Perth)
8. Let the Flames Begin
9. Pressure
10. For a Pessimist, I'm Pretty Optimistic (in Brisbane, Adelaide and Perth)
11. Where The Lines Overlap (only in Adelaide and Perth)
12. Decode

Encore:

1. Misery Business
2. Brick by Boring Brick

==== Tour dates ====
Date	City	Country	Venue
Asia
February 10, 2010	Osaka	Japan	IMP Hall
February 13, 2010	Tokyo	Japan	Studio Coast
February 14, 2010	Tokyo	Japan	Studio Coast
February 16, 2010	Nagoya	Japan	Diamond Hall
Oceania
February 19, 2010	Brisbane	Australia	The Tivoli
February 20, 2010	Brisbane	Australia	RNA Showgrounds^{[b]}
February 21, 2010	Sydney	Australia	Eastern Creek Raceway^{[b]}
February 23, 2010	Melbourne	Australia	Festival Hall
February 24, 2010	Sydney	Australia	Luna Park
February 26, 2010	Melbourne	Australia	Melbourne Showgrounds^{[b]}
February 27, 2010	Adelaide	Australia	Bonython Park^{[b]}
March 1, 2010	Perth	Australia	Bassendean Oval^{[b]}
March 4, 2010	Auckland	New Zealand	Trusts Stadium
March 5, 2010	Christchurch	New Zealand	Westpac Centre
Asia
March 7, 2010	Singapore		Singapore Indoor Stadium
March 9, 2010	Pasay	Philippines	SM Mall of Asia Concert Grounds

b This concert is a part of the Soundwave Festival

=== The Spring Tour ===
Paramore, The Spring tour.

==== Opening acts ====
- Relient K
- fun.

==== Setlist ====
North America
1. Intro
2. Looking Up
3. That's What You Get
4. Playing God
5. Pressure
6. For A Pessimist, I'm Pretty Optimistic
7. Miracle (only in Knoxville)
8. Brighter (except show in Knoxville)
9. Turn It Off
10. The Only Exception
11. Whoa
12. crushcrushcrush
13. Let The Flames Begin ('Oh Father' outro)
14. Ignorance
15. Where The Lines Overlap
16. Careful
17. Brick By Boring Brick

Encore:

1. Decode
2. Misery Business
Radio 1's Big Weekend
1. Looking Up
2. That's What You Get
3. Pressure
4. For A Pessimist I'm Pretty Optimistic
5. Decode
6. The Only Exception
7. Ignorance
8. Brick By Boring Brick
9. Misery Business
KROQ Weenie Roast
1. Ignorance
2. That's What You Get
3. Pressure
4. For A Pessimist I'm Pretty Optimistic
5. Decode
6. Brick By Boring Brick
7. Misery Business

==== Tour dates ====
Date	City	Country	Venue
North America
April 23, 2010	Lake Buena Vista	United States	Walt Disney World Resort^{[c]}
April 24, 2010	Lake Buena Vista	United States	Walt Disney World Resort^{[c]}
April 26, 2010	Knoxville	United States	Knoxville Civic Coliseum
April 28, 2010	Charlottesville	United States	John Paul Jones Arena
April 30, 2010	Atlantic City	United States	Trump Taj Mahal
May 1, 2010	East Rutherford	United States	The Bamboozle
May 3, 2010	Columbus	United States	Lifestyle Communities Pavilion
May 4, 2010	Walker	United States	DeltaPlex Arena
May 6, 2010	Rockford	United States	Rockford MetroCentre
May 7, 2010	Moline	United States	iWireless Center
May 8, 2010	Council Bluffs	United States	Westfair Amphitheater
May 10, 2010	West Valley City	United States	Maverik Center
May 12, 2010	Seattle	United States	WaMu Theater
May 15, 2010	Bakersfield	United States	Rabobank Arena
May 16, 2010	Paradise	United States	The Joint
Europe
May 23, 2010	Bangor	Wales	Faenol Estate^{[d]}
North America
June 5, 2010	Irvine	United States	Verizon Wireless Amphitheater^{[e]}

c This concert is a part of the Disney Grad Nite d This concert is a part of the Radio 1's Big Weekend e This concert is a part of the KROQ Weenie Roast

=== European Festival & Concert Tour ===
==== Opening Acts ====
- The Blackout (Belfast)

==== Setlist ====
European Festival

The setlist was cut short for some shows, depending on the amount of time the band were allowed to play for.

1. Looking Up
2. Pressure
3. That's What You Get
4. Where The Lines Overlap
5. Ignorance
6. Crushcrushcrush
7. Decode
8. Careful
9. Let The Flames Begin
10. Brick By Boring Brick
11. For A Pessimist, I'm Pretty Optimistic
12. Misery Business
Belfast
1. Looking Up
2. That's What You Get
3. Playing God
4. Pressure
5. For A Pessimist, I'm Pretty Optimistic
6. Brighter
7. Turn It Off
8. The Only Exception
9. Whoa
10. crushcrushcrush
11. Let The Flames Begin
12. Ignorance
13. Where The Lines Overlap
14. Careful
15. Brick By Boring Brick

Encore:

1. Decode
2. Misery Business
21st Century Breakdown World Tour, Green Day and Paramore
1. Looking Up
2. That's What You Get
3. Ignorance
4. For A Pessimist, I'm Pretty Optimistic
5. Pressure
6. Decode
7. Brick By Boring Brick
8. Misery Business

===== Tour dates =====
Date	City	Country	Venue
Europe
June 18, 2010	Tuttlingen	Germany	Southside Festival
June 19, 2010	Scheeßel	Germany	Hurricane Festival
June 20, 2010	Gothenburg	Sweden	Pier Pressure
June 22, 2010	Belfast	Northern Ireland	King's Hall
June 23, 2010	Dublin	Ireland	Marlay Park^{[f]}
June 25, 2010	St. Gallen	Switzerland	Open Air Festival
June 26, 2010	Paris	France	Parc des Princes^{[f]}
June 27, 2010	Roeser	Luxembourg	Rock-a-Field
June 29, 2010	Arendal	Norway	Hove Festival
July 1, 2010	Roskilde	Denmark	Roskilde Festival
July 2, 2010	Werchter	Belgium	Rock Werchter

f This concert is a part of supporting Green Day on their 21st Century Breakdown World Tour

=== Honda Civic Tour ===
Paramore, The Honda Civic Tour.

==== Opening acts ====
- Tegan and Sara
- New Found Glory
- Kadawatha
- Relient K (select dates only)

==== Setlist ====
Raleigh & Harrington
1. Misery Business
2. Born For This
3. Ignorance
4. Feeling Sorry
5. That's What You Get
6. crushcrushcrush
7. Pressure
8. Careful
9. The Only Exception
10. When It Rains (acoustic)
11. Where The Lines Overlap (acoustic)
12. Misguided Ghosts (acoustic)
13. Decode
14. I Caught Myself (Harrington Only)
15. Looking Up
16. My Heart (Anaheim version)

Encore:

1. Let The Flames Begin (Oh Father Outro)
2. Brick By Boring Brick
North America
1. Ignorance
2. Feeling Sorry
3. That's What You Get
4. For A Pessimist I'm Pretty Optimistic
5. Emergency
6. Playing God
7. Careful
8. Decode
9. You Ain’t Woman Enough (acoustic cover)
10. When It Rains (acoustic)
11. Where The Lines Overlap (acoustic)
12. Misguided Ghosts (acoustic)
13. Let The Flames Begin
14. crushcrushcrush
15. Pressure
16. Looking Up
17. The Only Exception

Encore:

1. Brick By Boring Brick
2. Misery Business
Leeds Festival

The setlist was cut short due to technical problems.

1. Ignorance
2. Feeling Sorry
3. That's What You Get
4. For A Pessimist I'm Pretty Optimistic
5. Playing God
6. The Only Exception
7. Decode
8. Brick By Boring Brick
9. Misery Business
Reading Festival
1. Misery Business
2. That's What You Get
3. Looking Up
4. For A Pessimist I'm Pretty Optimistic
5. Ignorance
6. Playing God
7. The Only Exception
8. Let The Flames Begin (extended outro)
9. Crushcrushcrush
10. Pressure
11. Decode
12. Brick By Boring Brick

===== Tour dates =====
Date	City	Country	Venue
North America
July 23, 2010	Raleigh	United States	Raleigh Amphitheater
July 24, 2010	Harrington	United States	Delaware State Fair
July 27, 2010	Wallingford	United States	Chevrolet Theatre
July 28, 2010	Mansfield	United States	Comcast Center
July 30, 2010	Norfolk	United States	Ted Constant Convocation Center
July 31, 2010	Columbia	United States	Merriweather Post Pavilion
August 1, 2010	Glens Falls	United States	Glens Falls Civic Center
August 3, 2010	Gilford	United States	Meadowbrook U.S. Cellular Pavilion
August 4, 2010	Philadelphia	United States	Festival Pier
August 6, 2010	Wantagh	United States	Nikon at Jones Beach Theater
August 7, 2010	Hershey	United States	Star Pavilion
August 8, 2010	Darien	United States	Darien Lake Performing Arts Center
August 10, 2010	Cleveland	United States	Time Warner Cable Amphitheater
August 12, 2010	Cincinnati	United States	PNC Pavilion
August 14, 2010	Milwaukee	United States	Summerfest
August 15, 2010	Rochester	United States	Meadowbrook Music Festival
August 18, 2010	Chicago	United States	Charter One Pavilion
August 19, 2010	Indianapolis	United States	The Lawn
August 21, 2010	Nashville	United States	Nashville Municipal Auditorium
Europe
August 28, 2010	Leeds	England	Reading and Leeds Festivals ^{[g]}
August 29, 2010	Reading	England	Reading and Leeds Festivals ^{[g]}
North America
September 1, 2010	Duluth	United States	Gwinnett Center
September 2, 2010	St. Augustine	United States	St. Augustine Amphitheatre
September 4, 2010	Miami	United States	Bayfront Park Amphitheater
September 5, 2010	Orlando	United States	UCF Arena
September 7, 2010	New Orleans	United States	Lakefront Arena
September 8, 2010	The Woodlands	United States	Cynthia Woods Mitchell Pavilion
September 10, 2010	Grand Prairie	United States	Verizon Theatre
September 13, 2010	Morrison	United States	Red Rocks Amphitheatre
September 15, 2010	Phoenix	United States	Dodge Theatre
September 17, 2010	San Jose	United States	HP Pavilion at San Jose
September 18, 2010	San Diego	United States	Viejas Arena
September 19, 2010	Anaheim	United States	Honda Center

g This concert is part of the Reading and Leeds Festivals weekend

=== Oceania and Asia Tour ===
==== Opening acts ====
- Relient K
- Jury and the Saints
- Yes2Kapitalism (Asia)

==== Setlist ====
Oceania
1. Ignorance
2. Feeling Sorry
3. That's What You Get
4. For A Pessimist I'm Pretty Optimistic
5. Emergency
6. Playing God
7. Careful
8. Decode
9. You Ain’t Woman Enough (acoustic cover)
10. When It Rains (acoustic)
11. Where The Lines Overlap (acoustic)
12. Misguided Ghosts (acoustic)
13. crushcrushcrush
14. Pressure
15. Looking Up
16. The Only Exception

Encore:

1. Brick By Boring Brick
2. Misery Business
Asia
1. Ignorance
2. Feeling Sorry
3. That's What You Get
4. For A Pessimist I'm Pretty Optimistic
5. Emergency
6. Playing God
7. Careful
8. Decode
9. Never Let This Go (acoustic)
10. When It Rains (acoustic)
11. Where The Lines Overlap (acoustic)
12. Misguided Ghosts (acoustic)
13. crushcrushcrush
14. Pressure
15. Looking Up
16. The Only Exception

Encore:

1. Brick By Boring Brick
2. Misery Business

===== Tour dates =====
Date	City	Country	Venue
Oceania
October 7, 2010	Wellington	New Zealand	TSB Bank Arena
October 8, 2010	Auckland	New Zealand	Vector Arena
October 10, 2010	Perth	Australia	Challenge Stadium
October 12, 2010	Adelaide	Australia	Adelaide Entertainment Centre
October 13, 2010	Melbourne	Australia	Sidney Myer Music Bowl
October 15, 2010	Sydney	Australia	Sydney Entertainment Centre
October 17, 2010	Brisbane	Australia	Riverstage
Asia
October 19, 2010	Kuala Lumpur	Malaysia	Bukit Jalil National Stadium

=== United Kingdom & Ireland Fall Tour ===
==== Opening acts ====
- B.o.B (UK – England, Ireland)
- All Forgotten (UK – Scotland)
- fun.
- Scuba Dice (Dublin)

==== Setlist ====
Ireland
1. Ignorance
2. Feeling Sorry
3. That's What You Get
4. For A Pessimist I'm Pretty Optimistic
5. Emergency
6. Decode
7. You Ain’t Woman Enough (acoustic cover)
8. Where The Lines Overlap (acoustic)
9. Misguided Ghosts (acoustic)
10. crushcrushcrush
11. Pressure
12. Looking Up
13. The Only Exception

Encore:

1. Brick By Boring Brick
2. Misery Business
United Kingdom
1. Ignorance
2. Feeling Sorry
3. That's What You Get
4. For A Pessimist I'm Pretty Optimistic
5. Emergency
6. Playing God
7. Decode
8. Never Let This Go (acoustic) (Except for Nottingham & Liverpool)
9. You Ain't Woman Enough (acoustic cover) (Nottingham & Liverpool Only)
10. When It Rains (acoustic)
11. Where The Lines Overlap (acoustic)
12. Misguided Ghosts (acoustic)
13. Let The Flames Begin (Nottingham Only)
14. crushcrushcrush
15. Pressure
16. Looking Up
17. The Only Exception

Encore:

1. Brick By Boring Brick
2. Misery Business

===== Tour dates =====
Date	City	Country	Venue
Europe
November 6, 2010	Dublin	Ireland	The O2
November 8, 2010	Nottingham	England	Trent FM Arena
November 10, 2010	Liverpool	England	Echo Arena Liverpool
November 11, 2010	Sheffield	England	Sheffield Arena
November 13, 2010	London	England	The O2
November 15, 2010	London	England	The O2
November 16, 2010	Birmingham	England	LG Arena
November 18, 2010	Newcastle	England	Metro Radio Arena
November 19, 2010	Manchester	England	MEN Arena
November 20, 2010	Aberdeen	Scotland	AECC

=== USO ===
Date	City	Country	Venue
Asia
November 23, 2010	Kuwait City	Kuwait	Camp Arifjan

=== Holiday Shows ===
==== Setlist ====
Sacramento
1. Ignorance
2. Feeling Sorry
3. That's What You Get
4. For A Pessimist I'm Pretty Optimistic
5. Decode
6. crushcrushcrush
7. Pressure
8. The Only Exception

Encore:

1. Brick By Boring Brick
2. Misery Business (with audience member)
Seattle and Orlando
1. Ignorance
2. Feeling Sorry
3. That's What You Get
4. For A Pessimist I'm Pretty Optimistic
5. Emergency
6. Playing God
7. Decode (Miracle outro)
8. crushcrushcrush
9. Pressure
10. The Only Exception
11. Brick By Boring Brick
12. Misery Business
New York City
1. Brick By Boring Brick
2. Misery Business
3. The Only Exception

==== Tour dates ====
Date	City	Country	Venue
North America
December 3, 2010	Sacramento	United States	ARCO Arena ^{[h]}
December 4, 2010	Seattle	United States	WaMu Theater ^{[i]}
December 5, 2010	Los Angeles	United States	Nokia Theatre L.A. Live ^{[j]}
December 10, 2010	New York City	United States	Madison Square Garden ^{[k]}
December 12, 2010	Orlando	United States	House of Blues ^{[l]}

h 107.9 The End Jingle Ball i 106.1 Kiss FM Jingle Bell Bash j 102.7 KIIS FM Jingle Ball k Z100 Jingle Ball l XL1067 XL'ent Xmas

== 2011 Paramore Tours ==
=== South American Tour ===
==== Opening acts ====
- Locomotor (Peru)
- El sin sentido (Colombia)
- Cambio de Habito (Venezuela)
- Outono '09 (Brasília)
- Alecto or Hey Ladies (Belo Horizonte)
- Fake Number (Rio de Janeiro and São Paulo)
- Doyoulike (Porto Alegre)
- Libra (Chile)
- Cirse (Argentina)
- I Am the Avalanche (Puerto Rico)

==== Setlist ====
South America
1. Ignorance
2. Feeling Sorry
3. That's What You Get
4. For a Pessimist I'm Pretty Optimistic
5. Emergency
6. Playing God
7. Careful
8. Decode
9. In the Mourning (first time ever live)
10. When It Rains (acoustic)
11. Where the Lines Overlap (acoustic)
12. Misguided Ghosts (acoustic)
13. crushcrushcrush
14. Pressure
15. Looking Up
16. The Only Exception

Encore:

1. Brick by Boring Brick
2. Misery Business
São Paulo
1. Ignorance
2. Feeling Sorry
3. That's What You Get
4. For a Pessimist I'm Pretty Optimistic
5. Emergency
6. Playing God
7. Careful
8. Decode
9. In the Mourning (acoustic)
10. When It Rains (acoustic)
11. Where the Lines Overlap (acoustic)
12. Misguided Ghosts (acoustic)
13. crushcrushcrush
14. Pressure
15. Looking Up
16. The Only Exception

Encore:

1. Brick by Boring Brick
2. My Heart
3. Misery Business

===== Tour dates =====
Date	City	Country	Venue
South America
February 16, 2011	Brasília	Brazil	Nilson Nelson Gymnasium
February 17, 2011	Belo Horizonte	Brazil	Chevrolet Hall
February 19, 2011	Rio de Janeiro	Brazil	Citibank Hall
February 20, 2011	São Paulo	Brazil	Credicard Hall
February 22, 2011	Porto Alegre	Brazil	Pepsi on Stage
February 24, 2011	Buenos Aires	Argentina	Luna Park
February 26, 2011	Santiago	Chile	Espacio Riesco
February 28, 2011	Lima	Peru	Jockey Club del Peru
March 2, 2011	Bogotá	Colombia	Corferias
March 4, 2011	Caracas	Venezuela	Terraza del C.C.C.T.
North America
March 6, 2011	San Juan	Puerto Rico	Coliseo de Puerto Rico, José Miguel Agrelot

=== MusiCares ===
==== Setlist ====
North America
1. Misery Business (Acoustic)
2. That's What You Get (Acoustic)

==== Tour dates ====
Date	City	Country	Venue
North America
May 6, 2011	Los Angeles	United States	Club Nokia

=== European Summer Tour ===
==== Setlist ====
Czech Republic
1. That's What You Get
2. Misery Business
3. For A Pessimist, I'm Pretty Optimisitc
4. Ignorance
5. Playing God
6. The Only Exception
7. Monster
8. Crushcrushcrush
9. Pressure
10. Brick By Boring Brick
Poland
1. Ignorance
2. Feeling Sorry
3. That's What You Get
4. For A Pessimist, I'm Pretty Optimistic
5. Emergency
6. Playing God
7. Decode
8. When It Rains (acoustic)
9. Where The Lines Overlap (acoustic)
10. Crushcrushcrush
11. Monster
12. Pressure
13. Looking Up
14. The Only Exception

Encore:

1. Brick By Boring Brick
2. Misery Business (at the end Hayley took one girl from the crowd to sing with them)
Finland and Portugal

Intro (special in Portugal)

1. Ignorance
2. Feeling Sorry
3. That's What You Get
4. For A Pessimist, I'm Pretty Optimistic
5. Emergency
6. Playing God
7. Crushcrushcrush
8. Monster
9. Pressure
10. Looking Up
11. The Only Exception
12. Brick By Boring Brick
13. Misery Business
Sweden and Spain
1. Ignorance
2. Feeling Sorry
3. That's What You Get
4. For A Pessimist, I'm Pretty Optimistic
5. Emergency
6. Playing God
7. Decode
8. When It Rains (acoustic)
9. Where The Lines Overlap (acoustic)
10. Misguided Ghosts (acoustic)
11. Crushcrushcrush
12. Monster
13. Pressure
14. Looking Up
15. The Only Exception

Encore:

1. Draw the Line cover by Aerosmith (only in Madrid)
2. Brick By Boring Brick
3. Misery Business

==== Tour dates ====
Date	City	Country	Venue
Europe
July 3, 2011	Hradec Králové	Czech Republic	Rock for People
July 4, 2011	Warsaw	Poland	Park Sowinskiego Amphitheatre ^{[m]}
July 6, 2011	Karlskoga	Sweden	Putte I Parken
July 8, 2011	Turku	Finland	Ruisrock
July 9, 2011	Oeiras	Portugal	Optimus Alive!
July 11, 2011	Madrid	Spain	Palacio Vistalegre ^{[n]}

m This concert is a part of the Rock In Summer Festival n This concert is a part of the U18 Festival

=== The Vans Warped Tour ===
==== Setlist ====
North America
1. That's What You Get
2. For A Pessimist, I'm Pretty Optimisitc
3. Careful
4. Looking Up
5. Here We Go Again
6. Pressure
7. Ignorance
8. Monster
9. Misery Business
Scranton
1. That's What You Get
2. For A Pessimist, I'm Pretty Optimisitc
3. Ignorance
4. Pressure
5. Here We Go Again
6. Looking Up
7. crushcrushcrush
8. Monster
9. Misery Business
Mississauga and Montreal
1. That's What You Get
2. For A Pessimist, I'm Pretty Optimisitc
3. Ignorance
4. Pressure
5. Here We Go Again
6. Looking Up
7. Monster
8. Misery Business

==== Tour dates ====
Date	City	Country	Venue
North America
July 14, 2011	Scranton	United States	Toyota Pavilion at Montage Mountain
July 15, 2011	Mississauga	Canada	The Flats at Arrow Hall
July 16, 2011	Montreal	Canada	Parc Jean-Drapeau
July 17, 2011	Hartford	United States	Comcast Theatre
July 19, 2011	Milwaukee	United States	Marcus Amphitheater
July 20, 2011	Cuyahoga Falls	United States	Blossom Music Center
August 9, 2011	Chula Vista	United States	Cricket Wireless Amphitheatre

=== Asia Tour ===
==== Opening acts ====
- The Swellers

==== Setlist ====
Hong Kong
1. Ignorance
2. Feeling Sorry
3. That's What You Get
4. For A Pessimist I'm Pretty Optimistic
5. Emergency
6. Playing God
7. Decode
8. When It Rains (acoustic)
9. Where The Lines Overlap (acoustic)
10. Misguided Ghosts (acoustic)
11. Here We Go Again
12. crushcrushcrush
13. Monster
14. Pressure
15. Looking Up
16. The Only Exception

Encore:

1. Brick By Boring Brick
2. Misery Business
Indonesia and Singapore

Intro (band instrumental, Hayley Williams enters midway)

1. Ignorance
2. Feeling Sorry
3. That's What You Get
4. For A Pessimist I'm Pretty Optimistic
5. Emergency
6. Playing God
7. Decode
8. When It Rains (acoustic)
9. Where The Lines Overlap (acoustic)
10. Misguided Ghosts (acoustic)
11. crushcrushcrush
12. Monster
13. Here We Go Again
14. Pressure
15. Looking Up
16. The Only Exception

Encore:

1. Brick By Boring Brick
2. Misery Business

==== Tour dates ====
Date	City	Country	Venue
Asia
August 14, 2011	Chek Lap Kok	Hong Kong	AsiaWorld–Expo
August 17, 2011	Bali	Indonesia	Garuda Wisnu Kencana
August 19, 2011	Jakarta	Indonesia	Carnaval Beach
August 21, 2011	Singapore	Singapore	Singapore Indoor Stadium

=== U.S. Final Shows ===
==== Setlist ====
Honolulu
1. Ignorance
2. Feeling Sorry
3. For A Pessimist I'm Pretty Optimistic
4. Playing God
5. Decode
6. Monster
7. When It Rains (acoustic)
8. Misguided Ghosts (acoustic)
9. Where The Lines Overlap (acoustic)
10. Emergency
11. crushcrushcrush
12. Here We Go Again
13. Pressure
14. Looking Up
15. The Only Exception

Encore:

1. Brick By Boring Brick
2. Misery Business
New York
1. Careful
2. For A Pessimist I'm Pretty Optimistic
3. That's What You Get
4. Ignorance
5. Emergency
6. Playing God
7. Decode
8. In The Mourning (acoustic; with snippet of Fleetwood Mac's Landslide)
9. My Heart (acoustic)
10. crushcrushcrush
11. Monster
12. Here We Go Again (with snippet of At The Drive-In's One Armed Scissor)
13. Pressure
14. Looking Up
15. The Only Exception

Encore:

1. Renegade (live premiere)
2. Brick By Boring Brick
3. Misery Business

==== Tour dates ====
Date	City	Country	Venue
Oceania
August 24, 2011	Honolulu	United States	The Waterfront at Aloha Tower
North America
September 7, 2011	New York City	United States	Terminal 5 ^{[o]}

o This concert is a part of the Fueled By Ramen 15th Anniversary Show

== 2012 Paramore Tours ==
=== Setlist ===
North America and Europe
1. Brick by Boring Brick
2. Renegade
3. Born for This
4. For a Pessimist I'm Pretty Optimistic
5. Decode
6. That's What You Get
7. Pressure
8. Careful
9. In the Mourning (Including snippet of Fleetwood Mac's Landslide)
10. The Only Exception
11. Hallelujah
12. Fences
13. Looking Up
14. Ignorance
15. Monster (Drum intro & outro contains elements of 'Part II' at Belsonic (only drum intro in Edinburgh)
16. Whoa

Encore

17. Hello Cold World
18. Misery Business
Reading and Leeds Festivals
1. Brick by Boring Brick
2. Renegade
3. For a Pessimist I'm Pretty Optimistic
4. That's What You Get
5. Pressure
6. Decode
7. The Only Exception
8. Careful
9. Ignorance
10. Monster (Part II outro in Reading Festival)
11. Misery Business

Date	City	Country	Venue
North America
August 14, 2012	Pomona	United States	Pomona Fox Theater
Europe
August 19, 2012	Belfast	Northern Ireland	Custom House Square ^{[p]}
August 21, 2012	Edinburgh	Scotland	Edinburgh Corn Exchange
August 24, 2012	Reading	England	Reading and Leeds Festivals
August 25, 2012	Leeds	England	Reading and Leeds Festivals

p This concert is a part of the Belsonic festival
