= In the Mourning =

Single by Paramore

from the album Singles Club EP
- Released: 5 December 2011
- Recorded: 2010
- Genre: Country folk
- Length: 3:05
- Label: Fueled by Ramen
- Songwriter(s): Hayley Williams; Taylor York
- Producer(s): Rob Cavallo

Paramore singles chronology
"Hello Cold World" (2011)	"In the Mourning" (2011)	"Now" (2013)

"In the Mourning" is a song by American rock band Paramore. It was released on 5 December 2011 as the third single from Paramore's Singles Club series which was announced on the day of the single's release. It was announced that the band would release 3 singles until the end of 2011 with a single released per month, "In The Mourning" being the third and the last song of this EP.

The song was recorded with the previous singles "Monster", "Renegade" and "Hello Cold World" in a session with producer Rob Cavallo, who had previously worked with Paramore on their album Brand New Eyes.

== Background ==
The song was released in a video posted on 13 January 2011 on Paramore's official website. In the video, Hayley Williams and Taylor York perform the song acoustically. "In The Mourning" was the first Paramore song that came after Josh Farro and Zac Farro left the band.

"I did not want to publish the full song yet, I do not want to believe it is a song from the "new Paramore". It's something I wrote just for fun. I hope you like it!".

— Hayley Williams

On the Brand New Eyes World Tour, the band performed the song at South American leg, they first performed it in Brasilia, Brazil. At Fueled by Ramen's 15th anniversary show in 2011, the band performed the song as a mashup cover with Fleetwood Mac's "Landslide". They also performed "Renegade" for the first time at that show.

== Music video ==
The music video is a demo, only Williams and Taylor perform the song.

In the clip, frontwoman Hayley Williams and guitarist Taylor York perform a demo of the song, which features lyrics that could be read in the context of the recent departure of band members Josh and Zac Farro.

−"Now there's nothing but time that's wasted"

−"And words that have no backbone"

−"Now it seems like the whole world's waiting"

−"Can you hear the echoes fading?" Williams sings.

Williams posted rough audio of herself singing the track's chorus on her blog on Wednesday, and lyrics to "In the Mourning" surfaced days after the band announced the departure of the Farro brothers.

"I don't want people thinking it's a new Paramore song, this is just something I wrote for fun."

— Hayley Williams

== Track listing ==
1. "In the Mourning" – 3:05
