= 2010 Summer Tour EP =

2010 Summer Tour

EP by Paramore, Tegan and Sara, New Found Glory and Kadawatha
- Released: July 20, 2010
- Genre: Alternative rock; emo; pop punk
- Length: 22:59
- Label: Fueled by Ramen

Paramore chronology
Brand New Eyes (2009)	2010 Summer Tour (2010)	The Only Exception (2010)

Tegan and Sara chronology
Sainthood (2009)	2010 Summer Tour (2010)	Heartthrob (2013)

New Found Glory chronology
Swiss Army Bro-Mance (2010)	2010 Summer Tour (2010)	Radiosurgery (2011)

2010 Summer Tour is an EP that features the American rock band Paramore, Canadian indie rock band Tegan and Sara, American rock band New Found Glory, and Swedish band Kadawatha. The EP was sold during the 2010 Honda Civic Tour and the remaining dates of Paramore's Brand New Eyes World Tour.

== Track listing ==
2010 Summer Tour EP track listing
No.	Title	Length
1.	"Ignorance" (Paramore live at Wembley Arena)	3:49
2.	"My Heart" (Paramore live at Wembley Arena)	6:08
3.	"Back in Your Head" (Tegan and Sara live acoustic in Australia)	3:31
4.	"Sheets" (Tegan and Sara previously unreleased track)	3:18
5.	"I'm the Fool" (New Found Glory B-side)	3:38
6.	"Gonna Stay" (Kadawatha previously unreleased track)	3:15

== Personnel ==
=== Paramore ===
- Hayley Williams - lead vocals
- Josh Farro - guitar, backing vocals
- Taylor York - guitar
- Jeremy Davis - bass
- Zac Farro - drums

=== Tegan and Sara ===
- Tegan Quin - vocals, guitar, keyboards
- Sara Quin - vocals, guitar, keyboards
- Ted Gowans - guitar, keyboards
- Shaun Huberts - bass
- Johnny Andrews - drums

=== New Found Glory ===
- Jordan Pundik - lead vocals
- Chad Gilbert - lead guitar, backing vocals
- Steve Klein - rhythm guitar
- Ian Grushka - bass
- Cyrus Bolooki - drums

=== Kadawatha ===
- Daniel Kadawatha - vocals
