= Renegade (Paramore song) =

Single by Paramore

from the EP Singles Club
- Released: 11 April 2011
- Recorded: 2010
- Genre: Power pop; pop-punk
- Length: 3:28
- Label: Fueled by Ramen
- Songwriter(s): Hayley Williams; Taylor York
- Producer(s): Rob Cavallo; Paramore

Paramore singles chronology
"Monster" (2011)	"Renegade" (2011)	"Hello Cold World" (2011)

"Renegade" is a song by American rock band Paramore. It was released on 11 October 2011 as the first single from Paramore's Singles Club series which was announced on the day of the single's release. It was announced that the band would release three singles until the end of 2011 with a single released per month, "Renegade" being the first one and followed by "Hello Cold World" on 7 November and "In the Mourning" on 5 December.

The song was recorded along with the band's previous single "Monster" during a short recording session with producer Rob Cavallo, which resulted in four songs that the band decided to release as stand alone singles, to purchase exclusively on the Singles Club on their official website.

== Reception ==
The song has been met with positive reception. Popcrush.com gave the song a positive review stating "is a peppy feel-good song that will undoubtedly get your blood pumping and your feet on the floor", also complimenting Williams' vocals "Renegade' displays the beautiful-but-rigid vocal stylings of Hayley Williams, but brings a new element of self-satisfaction to the band’s enormous song collection. It’s familiar without being too familiar". Katherine St Asaph from Popdust.com, however, described Hayley Williams' voice as being "mixed fairly low" but still complimented the track and its production by saying "Renegade is perfectly sleek, perfectly immediate power pop. Nothing it does is new for the genre; [...] nor is it the most massive chunk of pop-punk, or the fiercest or hardest or any other superlative. What it is, though, is practically an anomaly". She ended the review with a very positive note, giving the song four and a half stars out of five, complimenting, once again, the band's work, claiming the song to be "what Paramore does best".
