= Singles club =

Singles club may refer to:

- A Dance club for single adults
- A Dating service for single adults
- Singles Club (EP), an EP released by Paramore
- Singles Club (Blue Dog Records), a "record a month" club by Blue Dog Records
- Sub Pop Singles Club, a subscription service by Sub Pop Records
