= Playing God (Paramore song) =

Single by Paramore

from the album Brand New Eyes
- Released: November 15, 2010
- Recorded: 2009; Lightning Sound Studios (Hidden Hills, California)
- Length: 3:03
- Label: Fueled by Ramen
- Songwriters: Hayley Williams; Josh Farro; Taylor York
- Producers: Rob Cavallo; Paramore

Paramore singles chronology
"Careful" (2010)	"Playing God" (2010)	"Monster" (2011)

Music video
- "Playing God" on YouTube

"Playing God" is a song by American rock band Paramore, taken from their third studio album, Brand New Eyes (2009). The song was written by the band's lead singer Hayley Williams, lead guitarist Josh Farro, and rhythm guitarist Taylor York, and produced by Rob Cavallo, and the band. It was released as the fifth and final single from the album on November 15, 2010. It was also the final single to feature former band members Josh and Zac Farro before their departure in 2010. Zac Farro returned to the band in 2017.

== Release ==
In October, 2010, it was announced "Playing God" would be Paramore's next single on the Alter the Press! website, to be released on November 15, 2010. Lead singer Hayley Williams said on her Twitter: "Miss Anne will be making her final appearance in our new video for “Playing God”... She was the best car. She'll live in our hearts 4ever".

== Writing and composition ==
The song was written by Williams, Josh Farro and Taylor York. Williams said she wrote the song at a time when she felt "very angry".

When asked about the development of music during an interview on each track, Williams said:

"All five of us met up at Zac [Farro, drums] and Josh’s house and sat around their living room with two acoustic guitars and [bassist] Jeremy Davis’ bass. Josh and Taylor [York, guitar] started playing these two picking guitar lines--it felt very Jimmy Eat World-ish. Naturally, we were all into it. I had all kinds of lyrics on my old Sidekick (R.I.P.) and the ones used in this song used to be a completely different song, in my head. I had it all fast and rude sounding. But for some reason, I really wanted to reuse them for the JEW sounding song. I changed the melody around and added more once Josh came up with music for the chorus. What I love about the song is the contrast between the subject matter and the melody. The song, at its core, is very angry. I'm ripping at self-righteous people, ripping at my own bandmates and anyone who ever made me feel not good enough. But the overall tone of the song is completely different. It's laid back and really fun. By the time we'd gotten to the studio, the song still needed a bridge. So I sat down at a piano and wrote the parts. It's one of my favorite bridges on the record--I love the call and response vocal that Josh and I did. I feel like this song is one of those that we've been waiting to write for a long time."

— Hayley Williams

== Reception ==
The song has received general acclaim from music critics. James Montgomery of MTV praised the video, noting: "Paramore are coming home, looking back, wrapping things ... It's a story that began with the band's future in serious doubt and ends with them stronger, happier and better than ever." He also stated; "So if "God" really is the end of the BNE line, well, then it's a fitting farewell. It is time for the band to turn the page, move on." His conclusion was that the video "was a bit of professionalism and fun, and I can not wait to see where they go from here." Emma Gaedeke Billboard magazine said: "'Playing God' plays off the same momentum that the video for 'Ignorance' did, as Williams is seen poisoning, detaining and interrogating her male bandmates with a magnifying glass in a dark basement ... While the video is an accurate representation of the ill-harbored feelings that the band once shared, there is no doubt that Paramore has since recovered. By the end of the video, Williams has untied the guys just enough so they can still rock out together, suggesting that while she may not be forgetting the past, she's definitely forgiving."

== Music video ==
The music video to promote the single was filmed on November 2, 2010 and was directed by Brandon Chesbro, who directed the band's previous videos, "The Only Exception" and "Careful". During the video's recording, Brandon posted several comments on his Twitter account, giving the news that the video was recorded during the day, and also revealing the first image from the filming of the video, depicting Williams as what appears to be a housewife, with a pink hair color. The video was released on November 16. It was the final video to feature former band members Josh Farro and Zac Farro before their departure in 2010.

=== Plot ===
The video is meant to be a sequel to "Ignorance", as Hayley is getting revenge on her bandmates for doing same exact thing to her not too long ago. The video was filmed entirely in the home of Williams in Franklin, Tennessee. The video begins with Williams getting out of her car, holding a bouquet of flowers, and entering into a basement where there are the rest of Paramore seated and fastened with rope, and a single light bulb hanging over their heads. Williams sings the chorus of the song to them, throwing down the flowers, and then leaving. This shows Williams as a "bad girl", which many Paramore fans found surprising and amusing. In another short, Williams is shown sitting down, holding onto the rope in her lap while looking at real photographs of her and her band members. Next, Williams sits at a table with friends; Williams' friends shown in the video are also personal friends of the band in real life; seen on screen are the wife of Jeremy Davis; Kathryn Camsey, ex-member Hunter Lamb, Brandon Chesbro's wife and new member of the band on tour, Jon Howard. When with the friends, the band members in the basement look up to the ceiling, being able to hear what is going on. At the table, Williams sees the rope and has flashbacks to the moment in which she "poisoned" those in the basement. Once she gets her friends to leave, Williams returns to the basement where she points a magnifying glass in their faces while singing the song. When Williams returns upstairs, she faces herself in the mirror and frame set-up that's featured on the back of Paramore's album cover. When singing the bridge of the song, there are shots of Josh singing the backing vocals with the band members in the basement. With shots of the rope around them coming undone by Williams, the band is shown playing the rest of the song together in the basement, showing that Williams had "freed" them. But before the song ends, Williams picks up the rope at her feet and pulls the rope still tied around the band members while playing. Walking up the steps out of the basement with one last look to the men, Williams shuts the door to the basement leaving them still tied up and trapped.

== Chart positions ==
Chart performance for "Playing God"
Chart (2010–11)	Peak position
UK Rock & Metal (Official Charts)	5
