= Decode (song) =

Single by Paramore

from the album Twilight: Original Motion Picture Soundtrack
- Released: October 21, 2008
- Recorded: September 2008
- Genre: Alternative rock; emo
- Length: 4:21
- Label: Atlantic; Fueled by Ramen; Warner
- Songwriters: Hayley Williams; Josh Farro; Taylor York
- Producer: Rob Cavallo

Paramore singles chronology
"That's What You Get" (2008)	"Decode" (2008)	"Ignorance" (2009)

Music video
- "Decode" on YouTube

"Decode" is a song by American rock band Paramore from the soundtrack of the 2008 romantic fantasy film Twilight. It was written by group members Hayley Williams, Josh Farro, and Taylor York. (Note: All three writers were members of Paramore at the time of song's recording and release. Josh Farro has since parted ways with the band.) The song was first made available October 1, 2008 through Twilight author Stephenie Meyer's website. "Decode" was promoted to American modern rock radio by Fueled by Ramen and impacted on October 21, 2008, serving as the soundtrack's lead single. It is also included as a bonus track on the international version of Paramore's third studio album, Brand New Eyes (2009).

"Decode" was an international commercial success, charting in the top 20 of the singles charts in Australia, France, and New Zealand, as well as earning the band their second top 40 hit on the Billboard Hot 100. The song was certified 2x Platinum in the United States on March 15, 2019, selling over 2,000,000 copies. It was awarded the Teen Choice Award for Choice Rock Song, and was also nominated for a Grammy Award in 2010 in the category of Best Song Written for a Motion Picture, Television or Other Visual Media.

== Background ==
Hayley Williams explained how the song's title and lyrics were inspired by the complicated relationship between the book's protagonists:

I chose the title "Decode" because the song is about the building tension, awkwardness, anger and confusion between Bella and Edward. Bella's mind is the only one which Edward can't read and I feel like that's a big part of the first book and one of the obstacles for them to overcome. It's one added tension that makes the story even better.

— Hayley Williams, in a statement posted by Stephenie Meyer.

== Composition ==
"Decode" is an alternative rock and emo song written by Hayley Williams, Josh Farro, and Taylor York specifically for the Twilight film. It, along with "I Caught Myself", was recorded in September 2008 in Nashville, Tennessee. According to the digital sheet music published by Alfred Publishing Co. Inc., "Decode" was composed in the key of B-flat minor and set in common time to a "moderately slow" tempo of 84 BPM. The song features a vocal range of one octave, seven notes, and one semi-tone – from the note of G_{3} to the note of F_{5} – and follows a chord progression of G♭_{maj}7 — B♭m/D♭ — B♭m — Fm.

The song opens with a four bar musical interlude before Williams begins singing. The song's lyrics speak to confusion regarding one's emotions and a growing sense of uncertainty. "How can I decide what's right when you're clouding up my mind?" she demands in the opening line, while in the chorus, she asks, "How did we get here, when I used to know you so well?" According to Heather Phares of AllMusic, "Decode" expounds "Bella Swan's supernatural love triangle angst."

== Critical reception ==
Alexandra Cahill of Billboard gave the song a positive review, writing, "vocalist Hayley Williams captures the tension and urgency between Edward and Bella with an impassioned, yet restrained performance". Cahill also stated, "expertly crafted follow-up Decode promises to stake a claim at modern rock and top 40 radio". Leah Greenblatt of Entertainment Weekly said that "Decode" took a step away from Paramore's "bouncier punk-pop sound for a more sprawling, Evanescence-like romanticism". Heather Phares of AllMusic complimented Williams's "crystalline vocals" on the track, but conceded that it failed to "match the best moments from the band's albums."

Variety ranked it as one of the best emo songs of all time in 2022.

=== Accolades ===
"Decode" was nominated for Best Song Written for a Motion Picture, Television or Other Visual Media at the 52nd Annual Grammy Awards (2010), but lost to "Jai Ho" from Slumdog Millionaire. It was the group's second Grammy nomination, and first as songwriters (their previous nomination being for Best New Artist in 2008).

== Commercial performance ==
=== North America ===
"Decode" debuted at number 35 on the Alternative Songs (then called Hot Modern Rock Tracks) chart dated October 25, 2008. It reached a peak position of 5 on the chart dated January 31, 2009, giving the band their third top ten hit on the chart, and spent 10 weeks in the top ten. "Decode" debuted at number 34 on the Billboard Hot 100 chart dated November 22, 2008, a career-best debut at the time. Seven weeks after its debut, it reached a new peak of 33, on the chart dated January 10, 2009. This earned the band their second top 40 hit. "Decode" also experienced moderate crossover success, charting at number 36 on the Billboard Mainstream Top 40 chart. As of October 2009, the song had sold 927,000 copies in the United States. In March 2019, the single was certified 2× Platinum by RIAA, indicating sales of over 2,000,000.

In Canada, "Decode" debuted at number 52 on the Canadian Hot 100 chart dated November 22, 2008. It rose 30 places (from 78 to 48) on the chart dated January 10, 2009 and peaked at this ranking. This earned the band their first top 50 hit in that country. "Decode" would remain the band's highest-charting single in Canada until the chart dated October 16, 2010, when "The Only Exception" rose 69 to 25.

=== International ===
In Australia, "Decode" debuted at number 36 on the ARIA Singles Chart for the week of November 24, 2008, the group's first top 50 effort. The song reached a peak position of 12 in its tenth week, on the chart of January 26, 2009. "Decode" was certified Gold by ARIA in 2009 and was later certified Platinum in 2010.

In New Zealand, the song debuted at number 40 on the Official New Zealand Music Chart for the week of November 24, 2008 and peaked at number 15 on the chart of January 26, 2009. The song was certified Platinum by Recorded Music NZ in March 2015, indicating sales of over 15,000.

In the United Kingdom, "Decode" entered the UK Singles Chart at number 78 for the week of December 14–20, 2008 and rose to its peak of 52 the following week.

The song also peaked at number 59 in Austria, 9 in Finland, 10 in France (their highest peak to date), 47 in Germany, 53 in Japan, and 60 in Switzerland.

== Music video ==
The official music video for "Decode" was shot in mid-October 2008 and was directed by Shane Drake. A teaser clip was presented by MTV on October 28, 2008, as part of the network's "Twilight Tuesday" promotion. The video premiered in full through MTV and its subsidiaries on November 3, 2008, one day ahead of the release of the soundtrack on which the song is featured. From December 11 to December 18, 2008, the music video and the film trailer were shown in the North American theater of PlayStation Home. The music video is included as a bonus feature with an introduction by the film's director, Catherine Hardwicke, on the DVD/Blu-ray release of Twilight.

The video features the band members walking and performing in the woods in Nashville, Tennessee (purporting to be Forks, Washington). While they play, there are also scenes of the band acting as tracker vampires searching through the woods. Clips of the Twilight film, primarily those used in the trailer, are also featured throughout the video.

== Track listings ==
UK download (soundtrack version)
No.	Title	Writer(s)	Length
1.	"Decode"	Hayley Williams; Josh Farro; Taylor York	4:22

International digital single / UK CD single
No.	Title	Writer(s)	Length
1.	"Decode" (Twilight soundtrack version)	Williams; Farro; York	4:21
2.	"Decode" (acoustic)	Williams; Farro; York	4:27
Total length:			8:48

12" Picture Disc (Hot Topic exclusive release)
No.	Title	Writer(s)	Length
1.	"Decode" (performed by Paramore)	Williams; Farro; York	4:21
2.	"Full Moon" (performed by The Black Ghosts)	Theo Keating; Simon William Lord	3:49
Total length:			9:10

== Cover versions ==
Joy Electric released a version of "Decode" on their 2009 cover album Favorites at Play. The song was performed on American Idol by season 11 finalist Colton Dixon during the top 24 week and by season 13 finalist Jena Irene during the top 11 week, the latter of which was a "Songs from the Cinema" theme.

== Live performances ==
Paramore has included the song in their setlist for their 2009–2012 Brand New Eyes World Tour and their 2014 Parahoy! event aboard the cruise ship Norwegian Pearl.

== Charts ==
=== Weekly charts ===
2008–2009 weekly chart performance for "Decode"
Chart (2008–2009)	Peak position
Australia (ARIA)	12
Austria (Ö3 Austria Top 40)	59
Belgium (Ultratip Bubbling Under Flanders)	3
Belgium (Ultratip Bubbling Under Wallonia)	20
Canada Hot 100 (Billboard)	48
Canada Rock (Billboard)	29
Finland (Suomen virallinen lista)	9
France (SNEP)	10
Germany (GfK)	47
Japan Hot 100 (Billboard)	53
Mexico (Billboard Ingles Airplay)	8
New Zealand (Recorded Music NZ)	15
Switzerland (Schweizer Hitparade)	60
UK Singles (Official Charts)	52
US Billboard Hot 100	33
US Alternative Airplay (Billboard)	5
US Pop Airplay (Billboard)	36

2022 weekly chart performance for "Decode"
Chart (2022)	Peak position
US Alternative Digital Song Sales (Billboard)	9
US Rock Digital Song Sales (Billboard)	14

=== Year-end charts ===
Year-end chart performance for "Decode"
Chart (2009)	Position
Australia (ARIA)	76
France (SNEP)	89
US Alternative Songs (Billboard)	21
US Rock Songs (Billboard)	41

== Certifications ==
Certifications and sales for "Decode"
Region	Certification	Certified units/sales
Australia (ARIA)	Platinum	70,000^{^}
New Zealand (RMNZ)	2× Platinum	60,000^{‡}
United Kingdom (BPI)	Platinum	600,000^{‡}
United States (RIAA)	2× Platinum	2,000,000^{‡}
^{^} Shipments figures based on certification alone.^{‡} Sales+streaming figures based on certification alone.

== Release history ==
List of releases, showing the region, date, format, and label
Country	Date	Format	Label	Ref.
Worldwide	October 1, 2008	Streaming	—N/a	
United States	October 21, 2008	Modern rock radio	Fueled by Ramen; Lava; RRP	
Worldwide	January 16, 2009	Digital download	Atlantic; Warner	
