= Brand New Eyes =

Studio album by Paramore
- Released: September 29, 2009
- Recorded: January–March 2009
- Studio: Lightning Sound Studios (Hidden Hills, California)
- Genres: Alternative rock; pop-punk; emo; emo pop
- Length: 40:18
- Label: Fueled by Ramen
- Producers: Rob Cavallo; Paramore

Paramore chronology
The Final Riot! (2008)	Brand New Eyes (2009)	2010 Summer Tour (2010)

Singles from Brand New Eyes
- 1. "Ignorance" Released: July 7, 2009; 2. "Brick by Boring Brick" Released: November 23, 2009; 3. "The Only Exception" Released: February 17, 2010; 4. "Careful" Released: June 8, 2010; 5. "Playing God" Released: November 15, 2010

Brand New Eyes (stylized in all lowercase) is the third studio album by the American rock band Paramore, released on September 29, 2009, through Fueled by Ramen as a follow-up to their sophomore album Riot! (2007). It was produced in collaboration with Rob Cavallo and recorded in Hidden Hills, California from January to March 2009. It is their first album with touring guitarist Taylor York as a permanent member, and was written by Hayley Williams and Josh Farro, with York contributing songwriting to four tracks. It was also the band's final album before Josh and Zac Farro's departure from the band in 2010. Zac would later rejoin in 2017 prior to the release of their fifth studio album, After Laughter.

Praised by critics for its songwriting and the band's increased maturity, the album won Best Album at the Kerrang! Awards 2010, and "The Only Exception" received a Grammy nomination for Best Pop Performance by a Duo or Group with Vocals. Several publications included Brand New Eyes in their year-end lists. The album produced five singles: "Ignorance", "Brick by Boring Brick", "The Only Exception", "Careful", and "Playing God", all of which have been commercially successful in the United States and internationally.

Brand New Eyes debuted at number two on the Billboard 200 selling 175,000 copies in its first week, becoming their biggest album on that chart, until their self-titled album debuted at number one in 2013. The album topped the charts in many countries across the world including Australia, New Zealand, Ireland, and the United Kingdom, making it the band's second-highest charting album to date. The album was certified double platinum in the United Kingdom by the British Phonographic Industry (BPI), and platinum in the United States by the Recording Industry Association of America (RIAA), and Australia by the Australian Recording Industry Association (ARIA). It was also certified gold in Argentina, Brazil, Canada, Ireland, and New Zealand. The band promoted the album with the Brand New Eyes World Tour, playing shows in North America, Asia, Europe, etc., as well as with festival appearances.

== Background and production ==
After the release of Riot! (2007), a blog post in early 2008 was posted stating that Paramore were having "internal issues." Coupled with a week of cancelled shows, speculation arose that the band was going to break up. Not long after, it was resolved and claimed to be an issue of the members never having time to talk about things such as how they "were all growing up, and sometimes, when you're growing up, you're not always growing together". Further struggles to write new material had singer Hayley Williams expressing doubts about songwriting and meeting the expectations placed on the band after the success of Riot!. In September 2008, Williams revealed that the band might release their next album in summer 2009. On November 18, 2008, the band announced they were writing their next album, again mentioning that it might be out in summer 2009.

Paramore spent six weeks in pre-production at Emac Studios in their hometown of Franklin, the first time they had undergone pre-production without the guidance of a producer. A visit from record producer Rob Cavallo reassured the band that they were on the right track. "The album totally rocks," Cavallo said, "yet it's also very subtle." The band subsequently felt that the album and their new material had the potential to surpass the success of their previous work. Although it was originally planned to record the album close to home in Nashville, the band commenced recording in Calabasas, California, with Cavallo at the end of March 2009. They then added to the original material written at home with additional tunes written with the help of Cavallo after the move to Calabasas. Similar to most rock records, the band mostly tracked the drums first, followed by the rest of the members recording scratch tracks that they later overdubbed. Paramore finished production by May 2009.

On June 15, 2009, three months before the album's release, the band announced that touring guitarist Taylor York became an official band member.

== Composition ==
I was writing these lyrics, and they didn't feel good — some of it hurt, some of it was like, 'Am I being too honest even with myself?' I had doubts that it was the right record.

— Hayley Williams on the "doubts" she had with the initial writing of the record.

The album's sound has been described as alternative rock, pop-punk, emo pop, and emo. Williams was concerned about lyrics that involved current issues, as opposed to resolved issues that she had written about in the past. "I was like, 'This isn't a feel-good song, because I'm writing about something I'm going through right now, and it's still painful,'" she continued. "And I confused that with actually not liking the songs, when actually I was prouder of them than I've ever been before. They're heavier emotions for me... I'm still going through some of this stuff, and these songs are really healing to me." The band as a whole treated the writing as a therapeutic experience, which helped them hash out old differences. Now that "all those words were out on the table", they were able to have their first real conversations in a long time, resolving the internal struggles they had been facing, by going back to the reasons why they started the band and had wanted to play music in the first place. Consequently, Paramore decided to name the record Brand New Eyes because of the allusion to seeing things from a whole new perspective, "Just trying to let go of whatever we might have struggled with the past and just see each other in a new way," explained Williams. The band soon felt that they were onto the right track, and, retrospectively looking back on Riot!, Paramore guitarist, Josh Farro, said "Riot! was a kiddie album, but we had to do that to get to this point."

== Promotion and release ==
On April 29, 2009, it was revealed that the band's next album would be released in September. The first single from the album was "Ignorance", which was made available via digital download on July 7, on the same date the album became available for pre-order on Paramore's official website. Brand New Eyes was released on September 29 through Fueled by Ramen. The album's cover, an image of a butterfly divided from its wings, inspired the line "The angles were all wrong / Now she's ripping wings off of butterflies". Two versions of the album were made available: a standard CD edition as well as a deluxe, limited edition package that has sold out worldwide. The deluxe version included the album on CD with the acoustic versions of Where The Lines Overlap and Ignorance, a 40-page hardcover journal written by Hayley Williams, an exclusive poster that comes with only the box set, a booklet with the lyrics from all the songs from Brand New Eyes, a color vinyl 7-inch single with the acoustic versions of Ignorance and Where The Lines Overlap, one picture of each band member, a certificate of authenticity, and a DVD featuring a 30 minute long exclusive 'making-of' documentary. The CD was also one of the first to use iTunes LP.

"Brick by Boring Brick" was confirmed to be the second single from the album, released in November 2009. In December, the group went on a headlining UK tour with support from You Me at Six. In November 2010, the group went on a headlining UK tour. The fifth single from the album, "Playing God", was released on the November 16. To assist with promotion of the single, a music video for "Playing God", was also released. The album was released in high resolution (96 kHz/24bit) on HDtracks.com in 2012. The high res version has a greater dynamic range than the CD release. In January 2015 another deluxe edition of the album was released in high resolution (96 kHz/24bit) on the US store of the British company 7digital: this edition includes the acoustic version of Ignorance (also featured on the physical 2009 deluxe edition mentioned above) and two new, previously unreleased, acoustic versions of Brick by Boring Brick and Turn It Off (both later included in the iTunes deluxe edition bundle).

== Critical reception ==
Professional ratings
Aggregate scores
Source	Rating
AnyDecentMusic?	6.8/10
Metacritic	73/100
Review scores
Source	Rating
AllMusic	3.5/5 stars
Alternative Press	4.5/5 stars
Big Cheese	5/5 stars
Drowned in Sound	8/10
Kerrang!	4/5 stars
Melodic	4/5 stars
NME	7/10
Rock Sound	9/10
Rolling Stone	3/5 stars
Spin	4/5 stars

According to Metacritic, Brand New Eyes holds a score of 73 out of 100, indicating "generally favorable reviews", based on 18 reviews through October 1, 2009. AbsolutePunk.net writer Julia Conny scored the album at 82% and praised frontwoman Hayley Williams, "Simultaneously down-to-earth and on top of the world, there is something about this Williams character that makes an album like Brand New Eyes more than another notch on that bitchy pop-rock bedpost. Just imagine what will happen when the band hits their mid-twenties." Andrew Leahey of AllMusic gave the album a positive review, stating, Brand New Eyes presents Paramore as a stronger, leaner, and altogether more consistent band."

Evan Lucy of Billboard also wrote a favorable review, saying, "Although the new set may lack the wide-eyed naiveté that made the group's past efforts so endearing, the newfound maturity makes for a compelling set of songs." Big Cheese magazine awarded a maximum five star rating and Cathy Reay wrote, "Brand New Eyes is a huge milestone for an intelligent, honest young band that deserve far more mainstream recognition than they get."

Alternative Press awarded the album 4.5 out of 5 and Scott Heisel praised the improvement of the album over its predecessor; "Riot! was ridiculously top-loaded, with an unmemorable second half. Eyes astonishes from start to finish, with the bouncy and confessional "Looking Up" and the immensely powerful track "All I Wanted" showing up as diamonds in an already gem-covered rough". Sarah Bee, journalist for the BBC gave a largely favorable review and summarized, "If you didn't like Paramore before, their third album is unlikely to sway you. They make the kind of forceful, commercial emo-pop that music lovers love to hate. However, as forceful, commercial emo-pop goes – and it does – Brand New Eyes is very good. It is brash and gauche, but charming."

Rock Sound however, went on to laud the slower efforts. "The album's big surprise comes in the form of the stripped-down closing tracks 'Misguided Ghosts' and 'All I Wanted', which see the fragility of Hayley's vocals laid against sparse instrumentation with truly immaculate results." Reviewer Faye Lewis went on to summarize, "Paramore are a young band growing up in the public glare, and although that would send many to the funny farm, it's made this quintet even stronger and Brand New Eyes is by far their best record yet".

Jon Dolan of Rolling Stone scored the album at three stars out of five. Much like Leonie Cooper of NME, he was critical of slower moments: "But some of the sweeping moments blunt the band's fresh-faced immediacy — as if the cute kids from the sticks have had a hard time turning pro." Spin magazine awarded four stars out of five in their review and complimented the band for standing out in a generic genre. "Paramore's follow-up, Brand New Eyes, which, at a moment of wet-and-wild Warped Tour cynicism (see Cobra Starship and 3OH!3), offers a principled reminder of a more earnest, honest age."

Drowned In Sound awarded the album eight out of ten and while writer Paul Stephen Gettings stated the record isn't "pushing any boundaries", he praised its longevity: "[...] if you're already a critic, this isn't going to convince you otherwise. This is a realization, and an affirmation, of Paramore's musical craftmanship and potential longevity. They have allowed themselves to grow and still retain the innocence and optimism that makes them so irresistible."

Kerrang! reviewer Dan Slessor gave the album 4 Ks (4/5) and claimed, "...in Brand New Eyes they have arguably delivered the most accomplished and affecting record of their career." NME were also favorable in their review. Although being critical of the album's slower moments, Leonie Cooper praised the record as a whole; "Sure, the two slower tracks might make for a break in the relentless pace, but who needs the rest? If you just so happen to be one of the best in the up-tempo pop-smattered emo-punk game, why bother slowing down? For this lot, more is most certainly more."

=== Accolades ===
Accolades for Brand New Eyes
Publication	Country	Accolade	Year	Rank
Rock Sound	UK	Top 75 Albums of the Year	2009	4
Spin	US	Best of '09 – Top 40 Albums	2009	20
Drowned in Sound	UK	Top 50 Albums of 2009	2009	10
Kerrang!	UK	Kerrang! Critics' Albums of 2009	2009	8
Alternative Press	US	Top 10 Albums	2009	2
Blare	Canada	Blare's Top 50 Albums of 2009	2009	6
The Village Voice	US	Pazz & Jop	2009	74

== Commercial performance ==
Commercially, Brand New Eyes was a major success. In the United States, the album debuted at number two on the Billboard 200, selling 175,000 copies. The following week the album slipped to number nine, selling an additional 44,000 copies. The album stayed on the main album chart for 32 weeks. In addition to the Billboard 200, the album managed to peak at number one on the Billboard Rock and Alternative Albums charts. On January 19, 2010, less than six months after the album was released, Brand New Eyes was certified gold by the RIAA for shipments of 500,000 albums and platinum on March 22, 2016 for shipments of 1,000,000 albums.

The tracks "Ignorance", "Brick by Boring Brick" and "Where the Lines Overlap" also made the Pazz & Jop Singles List.

== Tour ==
Paramore went on tour with No Doubt between mid-May and early August 2009. The band announced their North American tour for Brand New Eyes on their official site, with the Swellers and Paper Route joining them as opening acts. The first show of the tour was played at a packed Fox Theatre in Pomona, California, on September 29, 2009 (the day of the album's release). During "Decode", Williams lost her voice. Lead guitarist Josh Farro spoke to the crowd and although their set was cut short, the band played "Misery Business" instrumentally while the crowd sang Williams's vocal parts. The tour, which previously went from September 29 to November 1, 2009, was later officially postponed on October 2, 2009, due to a case of laryngitis for singer Williams. The full tour resumed on October 10, 2009, in Chicago. The band also announced that they would be doing a European tour starting off in Helsinki, Finland, on November 29, 2009, with You Me at Six, Paper Route, and Now, Now Every Children supporting all UK tour dates.

They performed in February 2010 in the Australian Soundwave Festival, along with bands such as You Me at Six, Taking Back Sunday, All Time Low and Alexisonfire. They performed at the Soundwave Festival before they did the Brand New Eyes Tour in Australia. Then in the first week of March they performed two concerts in New Zealand, one to a sell out crowd of 5,000 in Auckland and the other in Christchurch.

In July, August and September 2010, the band announced a tour in the Honda Civic Tour 2010. In May 2010, the band had a short UK tour for November 2010. After just one day of being on sale they added a second date at the O2 arena due to huge demand for tickets. They later added 2 extra dates to take it up to 8 concerts instead of the original 5. In June 2010, the band announced a short Australia Tour for October. In November 2010, the band announced a short in South American Tour for February and March 2011, and the band announced a short in American tour for December. In July 2011, the band had a short Europe tour.

== Track listing ==
All tracks are written by Hayley Williams and Josh Farro, except where noted.

Standard edition
No.	Title	Writer(s)	Length
1.	"Careful"		3:50
2.	"Ignorance"		3:38
3.	"Playing God"	Hayley Williams; Josh Farro; Taylor York	3:03
4.	"Brick by Boring Brick"		4:14
5.	"Turn It Off"		4:20
6.	"The Only Exception"		4:28
7.	"Feeling Sorry"	Williams; Farro; York	3:05
8.	"Looking Up"		3:29
9.	"Where the Lines Overlap"		3:18
10.	"Misguided Ghosts"	Williams; Farro; York	3:01
11.	"All I Wanted"	Williams; York	3:48
Total length:			40:14

=== Bonus tracks ===
International edition bonus track
No.	Title	Writer(s)	Length
12.	"Decode"	Williams; Farro; York	4:22
Total length:			44:36

Deluxe edition bonus tracks
No.	Title	Length
12.	"Ignorance" (acoustic version)	3:40
13.	"Where the Lines Overlap" (acoustic version)	3:12
Total length:		47:06

Japanese edition bonus tracks
No.	Title	Length
12.	"Decode" (Williams, Farro, York)	4:22
13.	"Ignorance" (acoustic version)	3:40
Total length:		48:16

7digital US Deluxe edition bonus tracks
No.	Title	Length
12.	"Ignorance" (acoustic version)	3:40
13.	"Brick by Boring Brick" (acoustic version)	4:22
14.	"Turn It Off" (acoustic version)	3:47
Total length:		52:03

iTunes Deluxe edition bonus tracks
No.	Title	Length
12.	"Ignorance" (acoustic version)	3:40
13.	"Brick by Boring Brick" (acoustic version)	4:22
14.	"Turn It Off" (acoustic version)	3:47
Total length:		56:25

=== Limited edition bonus DVD ===
1. "Making the Album" documentary – 30:00
2. In-studio footage
3. Interviews
4. Paramore.net episodes:
  - (Cocky) Basketball
  - Ping Pong
  - Cribz, Part 1
  - Cribz, Part 2
  - Zac and Kevin
  - Z and T Presents "Baby Come Back 2 Me"
5. Photo gallery (exclusive in-studio)

== Personnel ==
Paramore

- Hayley Williams – lead vocals
- Josh Farro – guitar, backing vocals
- Taylor York – guitar
- Jeremy Davis – bass
- Zac Farro – drums

Additional musicians

- Jamie Muhoberac – keyboards, organ

Artwork

- Kistie Borgmann & Sarah Deane – art coordinators
- Ryan Russell & Paramore – art direction & design
- Ryan Russell – photography
- Brian Ranney – packing production

Production

- Rob Cavallo – producer
- Doug McKean – engineer, mixing on "Misguided Ghosts"
- Dan Chase, Lars Fox – Pro Tools engineers
- Chris Lord-Alge – mixing
- Keith Armstrong, Nik Karpen – assisted mixing
- Brad Townsend – additional engineering
- Nate Warshowsky – drum tech
- Riley Emminger – guitar tech
- Cheryl Jenets – production manager
- Jaime Neely – production assistant
- Ted Jensen – mastering

== Charts ==
=== Weekly charts ===
Weekly chart performance for Brand New Eyes
Chart (2009)	Peak position
Australian Albums (ARIA)	1
Austrian Albums (Ö3 Austria)	6
Belgian Albums (Ultratop Flanders)	20
Belgian Albums (Ultratop Wallonia)	34
Canadian Albums (Billboard)	3
Danish Albums (Hitlisten)	26
Dutch Albums (Album Top 100)	23
Finnish Albums (Suomen virallinen lista)	5
French Albums (SNEP)	36
German Albums (Offizielle Top 100)	7
Greek Albums (IFPI)	23
Irish Albums (IRMA)	1
Italian Albums (FIMI)	33
Japanese Albums (Oricon)	19
Mexican Albums (Top 100 Mexico)	7
New Zealand Albums (RMNZ)	1
Norwegian Albums (VG-lista)	27
Scottish Albums (Official Charts)	1
Spanish Albums (Promusicae)	25
Swedish Albums (Sverigetopplistan)	17
Swiss Albums (Schweizer Hitparade)	15
UK Albums (Official Charts)	1
UK Rock & Metal Albums (Official Charts)	1
US Billboard 200	2
US Top Alternative Albums (Billboard)	1
US Top Rock Albums (Billboard)	1

=== Year-end charts ===
2009 year-end chart performance for Brand New Eyes
Chart (2009)	Position
Australian Albums (ARIA)	61
New Zealand Albums (RMNZ)	42
UK Albums (OCC)	94
US Billboard 200	113
US Top Rock Albums (Billboard)	29

2010 year-end chart performance for Brand New Eyes
Chart (2010)	Position
Australian Albums (ARIA)	77
New Zealand Albums (RMNZ)	47
UK Albums (OCC)	99
US Billboard 200	94
US Top Rock Albums (Billboard)	23

== Certifications ==
Certifications and sales for Brand New Eyes
Region	Certification	Certified units/sales
Argentina (CAPIF)	Gold	20,000^{^}
Australia (ARIA)	Platinum	70,000^{^}
Brazil (Pro-Música Brasil)	Gold	30,000^{*}
Canada (Music Canada)	Gold	40,000^{^}
Ireland (IRMA)	Gold	7,500^{^}
New Zealand (RMNZ)	3× Platinum	45,000^{‡}
United Kingdom (BPI)	2× Platinum	600,000^{‡}
United States (RIAA)	Platinum	1,000,000^{‡}
^{*} Sales figures based on certification alone.^{^} Shipments figures based on certification alone.^{‡} Sales+streaming figures based on certification alone.

== Release history ==
Release dates and formats for Brand New Eyes
Region	Date	Label	Format	Catalogue	Ref.
Various	September 25, 2009	Fueled by Ramen	CD, digital download	7567895804	
United Kingdom	September 28, 2009	Fueled by Ramen	CD, digital download	7567895804	
United States	September 29, 2009	Fueled by Ramen	CD, digital download, LP	518250	
Bahrain	September 29, 2009	Fueled by Ramen	CD, digital download	518250	
Japan	October 1, 2009	Fueled by Ramen	Enhanced CD	WPCR-13685	

== See also ==
- List of number-one albums of 2009 (Australia)
- List of number-one albums of 2009 (Ireland)
- List of number-one albums from the 2000s (New Zealand)
- List of UK Albums Chart number ones of the 2000s
