= Singles Club (EP) =

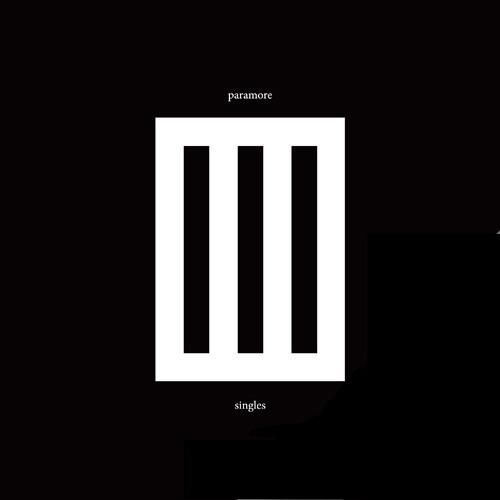

EP by Paramore
- Released: December 14, 2011
- Recorded: March 2011
- Length: 13:15
- Label: Fueled by Ramen
- Producer: Rob Cavallo

Paramore chronology
The Only Exception EP (2010)	Singles Club (2011)	Paramore (2013)

Singles from Singles Club
- 1. "Monster" Released: June 7, 2011; 2. "Renegade" Released: October 11, 2011; 3. "Hello Cold World" Released: November 7, 2011; 4. "In the Mourning" Released: December 5, 2011

Singles Club is an EP released by the American rock band Paramore. The songs were released as promotional singles between October and December 2011, culminating in the release of a box set containing the three constituent songs plus "Monster", which was recorded during the same sessions. The EP and box set were released on December 14, 2011, on Paramore's website. The EP was the first release of new material by Paramore not to include band members Josh and Zac Farro.

== Background ==
On January 14, Paramore posted a rough demo of the song "In the Mourning" on YouTube. The finished song in its entirety was played for the first time live on their South American Tour in early 2011. On September 7, Paramore performed at the fifteenth anniversary of their record label, Fueled by Ramen. New songs, "Renegade" and "In the Mourning" with an extract of a paragraph of "Landslide" by Fleetwood Mac was played. "Renegade" was the first song released off the Singles Club, available exclusively from the Paramore website. "Renegade" was featured as a short introduction tune on the web-series, "From the Field" – a mock-umentary of the band's daily lives on the Summer Warped Tour.

On October 11, Paramore announced they would be releasing new songs only available directly from their official website. "Renegade" was released on October 11, "Hello Cold World" on November 7 and "In the Mourning" on December 5.

"For months now, we've promised that we'd be releasing some new songs before the end of the year. Well, here is where we finally make good on all of that. We are very happy to announce the Paramore Singles Club that will be happening throughout the rest of the year. This club is our way of getting these songs directly to the Paramore family[...]."

On November 11, some of the first images of the Singles Club Box Set were posted online.

== Live performances ==
Not too long after it was posted online, "In the Mourning" was played live on Paramore's South American tour and along with 'Renegade", was played at the Fueled By Ramen 15th Anniversary Concert at Terminal 5 In New York City. "Monster", which is available with the Singles Club boxset but not with the download from the website, was also played at the anniversary and was played on some of the band's concerts after the release of the songs.

== Track listing ==
All tracks are written by Hayley Williams and Taylor York, except "Hello Cold World" (Williams, York, Jeremy Davis).

No.	Title	Length
1.	"Monster"	3:18
2.	"Renegade"	3:28
3.	"Hello Cold World"	3:23
4.	"In the Mourning"	3:05
Total length:		13:14

== Formats ==
- Singles Club digital songs + shirt + 7" box set
- Singles Club digital songs + 7" box set
- Singles Club digital songs

== Personnel ==
- Hayley Williams – lead vocals
- Taylor York – guitar, drums
- Jeremy Davis – bass
