= Pressure (Paramore song) =

Single by Paramore

from the album All We Know Is Falling
- Released: August 2, 2005
- Genre: Pop-punk; emo
- Length: 3:05
- Label: Fueled by Ramen
- Songwriters: Hayley Williams; Josh Farro
- Producer: James Wisner

Paramore singles chronology
"Pressure" (2005)	"Emergency" (2006)

Music video
- "Pressure" on YouTube

"Pressure" is a song by American rock band Paramore, released on August 2, 2005, as their debut single from their debut studio album, All We Know Is Falling. It failed to chart the Billboard Hot 100, however, it peaked at No. 62 on the Billboard Hot Digital Songs chart. On March 24, 2016, the song was certified gold by the Recording Industry Association of America (RIAA), for sales exceeding 500,000.

== Composition ==
"Pressure" has been described as pop-punk and emo.

== Music video ==
A music video directed by Shane Drake was released for the track in 2005. The video opens with Paramore playing in an abandoned warehouse. An intertwined storyline of the video is of young man who deals with the struggles of working at a fast food restaurant and trying to please his boss. A girl who is modeling is judged on what she wants to eat and what she wants to wear. All throughout the video, a pressure dial is shown and rises as the pressure builds for the two people. The man then quits his job after getting fed up with his boss and goes to the model. He signals to her to come with him but she's stuck preparing for a photoshoot. To get her out, the man sets off a fire alarm that causes the sprinklers in the building to go off. Simultaneously, sprinklers are set off on the band in the warehouse as the final chorus kicks in. The video closes with the couple escaping together and the band getting drenched in water.

As of April 2026, the music video for "Pressure" has over 54 million views on YouTube.

== Track listing ==
No.	Title	Length
1.	"Pressure"	3:05

== Charts ==
Chart (2007)	Peak position
US Digital Song Sales (Billboard)	62

== Certifications ==
Region	Certification	Certified units/sales
United States (RIAA)	Platinum	1,000,000^{‡}
^{‡} Sales+streaming figures based on certification alone.

== In popular culture ==
=== Covers ===
- New Found Glory has covered "Pressure" live.

=== Video games ===
- The song was featured as a track on the console version of The Sims 2 if you interact with a radio or stereo. As per usual for the series, the song was re-recorded with the lyrics in Simlish.
- A playable version of the song has been available as downloadable content for Rock Band 3, since December 27, 2011.

=== Other ===
- This song was later re-released on the iTunes Deluxe Edition of Riot! as a bonus track.
