= Careful (Paramore song) =

Single by Paramore

from the album Brand New Eyes
- Released: June 8, 2010
- Recorded: 2009
- Length: 3:50
- Label: Fueled by Ramen
- Songwriters: Hayley Williams; Josh Farro
- Producer: Rob Cavallo

Paramore singles chronology
"The Only Exception" (2010)	"Careful" (2010)	"Playing God" (2010)

Music video
- "Careful" on YouTube

"Careful" is a song by American rock band Paramore, and is the fourth single from their third studio album, Brand New Eyes. The song charted on the Billboard Hot 100 the week Brand New Eyes was released before it was announced as a single. It charted due to digital downloads. The song impacted radio on June 8, 2010.

== Reception ==
Ed Masley of The Arizona Republic ranked it as the 13th best Paramore song, stating "Its No. 78 performance on the Hot 100 isn't for a lack of accessible pop hooks."

Ex-guitarist Josh Farro, speaking with NME on the reasons he left the band, mentioned a lyric in "Careful" as being contradictory to their Christian faith.

== Music video ==
It was announced on the official Paramore fanclub that a video containing live footage of the song would be released on June 8, 2010. The video was shot and edited by Brandon Chesbro, who also directed the video for the band's previous single "The Only Exception". The video was released via Fueled by Ramen's YouTube account. It contains performances of the song in many concerts throughout 2009 and includes clips from their Brisbane Soundwave Tour and also at their one-off performance at Festival Hall in Melbourne, Australia. The clip also contains footage from their 2010 Spring Tour as well as their 2009 Fall Tour. It also shows clips of the band off stage. The music video is also the third of Paramore's videos to be a compilation of performances from various concerts, the first two being "All We Know" from All We Know Is Falling and "Hallelujah" from Riot!.

== Charts ==
Chart performance for "Careful"
Chart (2009–2010)	Peak position
Australia (ARIA)	89
Canada Digital Songs (Billboard)	63
UK Singles (OCC)	108
UK Rock & Metal (OCC)	2
US Billboard Hot 100	78
US Alternative Airplay (Billboard)	37
