= Brick by Boring Brick =

2009 single by Paramore

Single by Paramore

from the album Brand New Eyes
- Released: November 23, 2009
- Recorded: 2009
- Studio: Lightning Sound (California, US)
- Length: 4:13
- Label: Fueled by Ramen
- Songwriters: Hayley Williams; Josh Farro
- Producers: Rob Cavallo; Paramore

Paramore singles chronology
"Ignorance" (2009)	"Brick by Boring Brick" (2009)	"The Only Exception" (2010)

Music video
- "Brick By Boring Brick" on YouTube

"Brick by Boring Brick" is a song by American rock band Paramore. The song was released in late 2009 as the second single from their third studio album, Brand New Eyes (2009).

"Brick by Boring Brick" was also featured in The Vampire Diaries episode "Under Control" that aired on April 15, 2010. In terms of airplay, it is one of the album's successful singles, including the song "The Only Exception".

== Reception ==
The song received generally positive reviews from critics. Alex Fletcher of Digital Spy, who gave the song 4 stars out of 5. He said the song is "infectious, deliciously dark ('Well go get your shovel, and we'll dig a deep hole'), and packed with more energy than a Jedward dance routine – Williams sounds downright tremendous leading the 'ba-ba-ba' climax – this should provide a welcome edge at the top end of the charts". Rolling Stone stated that "Brick by Boring Brick" was able to "weave unexpected Smashing Pumpkins-style sonics into the mix." The song received a positive review from Vicki Lutas of the BBC, who awarded the song 5 out of 5 stars. She said that the song is "hair-raisingly BRILLIANT" and said "Listening to the lyrics is like entering a world where sandcastles aren't built, but buried, a world where the baddie is not the wolf, but reality... and in this world, things are dark, but they're very real. There's a sense of longing; longing for those fairy tales and longing for innocence, but it's coupled with a sense of realization that this will never happen."

== Music video ==
The music video for "Brick by Boring Brick" was filmed in Los Angeles on October 8, 2009. It was directed by Meiert Avis and produced by Jeremy Alter. The video depicts a young girl (Harley Graham) with butterfly wings exploring a surreal landscape, while Hayley sings the song near a large ditch which guitarist Josh Farro is digging. Eventually the little girl's fantasy world becomes dark and frightening, with the characters she was friends with before now turning into dark and sinister creatures. She runs to escape, picking up her doll, emerging into the sunlight and falls into the ditch by where Hayley is singing. Hayley stands up and tosses the girl's doll in after her, and Josh throws the first shovelful of earth into the ditch and continues doing so as Hayley walks away.

In an interview with MTV, bassist Jeremy Davis explained that the band had created a treatment for the video before receiving further ideas from several directors. The video is Paramore's first to not be performance based and some of the members of the band are only seen for a short period of time. It is their first video to be filmed in front of green screen, and to have "a whole story behind it", with acting. Guitarist Josh Farro likened the video to the 2006 Spanish fantasy film Pan's Labyrinth. It was originally set to premiere on November 17 on The Hills, but was later postponed. The video was eventually released on Paramore.net on November 23.

== Live performances ==
The track has been performed by Paramore on many occasions. The band's first performance of the song was in July 2009. Paramore performed a live version of "Brick By Boring Brick" for MTV Unplugged. It was also performed at the Ulalume Festival.

The song was performed as the last song on the band's Fall tour in October to December 2009. At the end of the song, the support groups would join the band on stage.

The band performed the song on Late Night with Jimmy Fallon on April 29, 2010.

== Track listing ==
7" picture disc
No.	Title	Length
1.	"Brick by Boring Brick" (album version)	4:13
2.	"Brick by Boring Brick" (acoustic)	4:22

US/Europe CD single
No.	Title	Length
1.	"Brick by Boring Brick"	4:13

== Charts ==
Chart performance for "Brick by Boring Brick"
Chart (2009–10)	Peak position
Australia (ARIA)	85
Belgium (Ultratip Bubbling Under Flanders)	16
Netherlands (Single Top 100)	95
Mexico Ingles Airplay (Billboard)	42
New Zealand (Recorded Music NZ)	29
UK Singles (Official Charts)	85
UK Rock & Metal (Official Charts)	2
US Hot Rock & Alternative Songs (Billboard)	20

== Certifications ==
Certifications and sales for "Brick by Boring Brick"
Region	Certification	Certified units/sales
New Zealand (RMNZ)	Platinum	30,000^{‡}
United Kingdom (BPI)	Gold	400,000^{‡}
^{‡} Sales+streaming figures based on certification alone.
