= Ignorance (song) =

2009 single by Paramore

Single by Paramore

from the album Brand New Eyes
- Released: July 7, 2009
- Studio: Lightning Sound (California, US)
- Genre: Pop-punk; pop rock
- Length: 3:38
- Label: Fueled by Ramen
- Songwriters: Josh Farro; Hayley Williams
- Producer: Rob Cavallo

Paramore singles chronology
"Decode" (2008)	"Ignorance" (2009)	"Brick by Boring Brick" (2009)

Music video
- "Ignorance" on YouTube

"Ignorance" is a song by American rock band Paramore. It was released on July 7, 2009 as the lead single from the band's third studio album, Brand New Eyes (2009). The song impacted radio on July 28. The song was written by band's members Hayley Williams and Josh Farro, although Paramore is credited as being co-writers of the song. The track, recorded in early 2009 at California's Lightning Sound, was the first song to be written for the album.

Farro's and Williams's inspiration for writing the song was from personal experiences. The song received positive reviews from critics for its energy-filled musicianship. "Ignorance" had minor success on the Billboard Hot 100, peaking at number 67. It also charted at numbers 7 and 20 on the Hot Modern Rock Tracks and Hot Rock Songs charts respectively. The song was certified gold in both the United States and the United Kingdom. The song's international chart performance fared better, peaking within the top 20 of British, Dutch and Japanese charts. A music video for "Ignorance" was released in August 2009. In the video, the band is shown playing in a room with the only source of lighting being a hanging light bulb.

== Background and composition ==
James Montgomery of MTV News viewed the pop-punk and pop rock song as lyrically being about the "destructive nature of gossip, about the ugly, tear-'em-down world in which Paramore exist." "Ignorance" was the first song written for Brand New Eyes. In an interview with Kerrang!, Williams, who co-wrote the song, discussed the song's meaning, and her and Farro's inspiration for writing the song, saying,

"In my eyes, this song is a huge turning point for the band. The truth of it is, growing up is not easy. We’re five different people who have to work towards the same goal on a daily basis. There were a lot of times when I felt really alone or angry or insecure. I don’t always feel good at confronting people, especially people that I love, like these guys. Sometimes it takes songs to get the point across. The song is from one person’s perspective. It’s unfair that I’m the one who gets to talk about it but it helped me a lot. The line ‘ignorance is your new best friend’ is about how I felt I was losing people, and I think the band did too. But it’s okay, we’re growing up. I love that song."

== Critical reception ==
"Ignorance" was generally well received by contemporary music critics. Leonie Cooper of NME, commented that "thankfully" Paramore's "new-found rage hasn’t impinged on their talent for crafting a joyful pop song, as evidenced by the high octane" like "Ignorance", remarking that while the song "might be dark in tone" the song is still a "fairground-full of fun." Melinda Newman of HitFix gave the song a positive review, saying that while the single breaks no "new ground" for Paramore, it shows an "increased level of confidence" and "older Paramore fans will be happy to hear the Evanescence influence seems to be gone." Marc Hirsh of The Boston Globe, described the track as being a "thrilling little headlong rush."

Jon Canamanica of The New York Times, described the song as sounding more like a "muscular No Doubt song," with a "rhythmic shift" at the songs hook that "suggested a quick cough of ska." Ryan Wood of the Nebraska City News-Press, strongly praised the track, commenting that the song "may go down" as the "best single ever." Scott Heisel of Alternative Press, viewed the single as being a "sort of a 'roided out" version of Paramore's 2007 studio album Riot!s song, "Misery Business" (2007). A writer for Saffron Walden News felt that the track displays Williams' "commendable and moody vocal range."

Ed Masley at The Arizona Republic ranked it as the 14th best Paramore song, stating "Williams' New Wave pout is put to brilliant use on this explosive rocker, dripping with contempt." In 2017, NME ranked the song number six on their list of the 10 greatest Paramore songs, and in 2021, Kerrang ranked the song number nine on their list of the 20 greatest Paramore songs.

== Chart performance ==
"Ignorance" debuted and peaked at number 67 on the Billboard Hot 100 for the week of July 25, 2009 before leaving the next week. It was more successful on other Billboard charts. The song peaked at number 58 on the Hot Digital Songs Chart; charting due to digital download sales. It also charted on Billboard's Rock Songs chart, peaking at number 20, as well as charting within the top ten on the Hot Modern Rock Tracks chart at number seven. It received similar chart presence in Canada, debuting and peaking at number 96 on the Canadian Hot 100 on the same week before leaving the chart.

The song received better chart success internationally. It peaked at number 14 in the United Kingdom and stayed on the chart for seven weeks. In France, the song charted within the top 20, peaking at number 17 and remained on the chart for eight weeks. The song peaked at number 35 in Australia, remaining on that chart for two weeks. It received similar chart success in New Zealand, peaking at number 32 and remained on the chart for five weeks. The song was less successful in the Netherlands, peaking at number 82 for the week of October 18, 2009 before leaving the chart. "Ignorance" was successful in Japan, peaking at number 10. The song also received similar chart success in Belgium, peaking at number 10 and remained on the chart for four weeks. "Ignorance" is the first single by the band to chart on the Irish Top 50 Singles Chart, peaking at number 49. It also charted at number 42 in Germany.

== Music video ==
The music video was released on August 13, 2009. The video begins with a door opening, showing Williams being singled out and ignored by other members of the band (performing in a cramped small room, that appears to be a closet). She shines a light bulb hanging by a wire directly in their faces, whilst describing how they treat her, "just like another stranger," in the lyrics. Other clips show a larger performance area and a different personality of Williams being laid bare in white clothes, hair pulled back in the style like Björk's hair from her music video "Big Time Sensuality", and with eye-makeup resembling the main character Alex from "A Clockwork Orange." The small-closed and bare settings emphasize the inescapable, rising tensions between the band members. It ends with the other members of the band being able to wrap the light bulb wire around Williams as she holds the bulb close to her face. James Montgomery of MTV News wrote that the video is "a claustrophobic, hard-charging thing that showcases Paramore: The Band. There is rumor that the Playing God is the sequel music video, showcasing Hayley getting back at her band mates."

== Track listing ==
CD single
No.	Title	Length
1.	"Ignorance"	3:38

7" picture disc vinyl (Hot Topic exclusive release)
No.	Title	Length
1.	"Ignorance"	3:38
2.	"Ignorance" (acoustic)	3:40

== Personnel ==
The following personnel contributed to "Ignorance":

Paramore

- Hayley Williams – lead vocals
- Josh Farro – lead guitar, backing vocals
- Taylor York – rhythm guitar
- Jeremy Davis – bass guitar
- Zac Farro – drums, percussion

Production

- Rob Cavallo – producer
- Paramore – co-producer
- Chris Lord-Alge – mixing
- Ted Jensen – mastering
- Doug McKean – engineering
- Jamie Muhoberac – keyboards, organ

== Charts ==
Chart performance for "Ignorance"
Chart (2009)	Peak position
Australia (ARIA)	35
Austria (Ö3 Austria Top 40)	17
Belgium (Ultratip Bubbling Under Flanders)	10
Canada Hot 100 (Billboard)	96
Canada Rock (Billboard)	34
Germany (GfK)	42
Ireland (IRMA)	49
Japan Hot 100 (Billboard)	10
New Zealand (Recorded Music NZ)	32
Scotland Singles (Official Charts)	8
Switzerland (Schweizer Hitparade)	82
UK Singles (Official Charts)	14
UK Rock & Metal (Official Charts)	1
US Billboard Hot 100	67
US Alternative Airplay (Billboard)	7
US Hot Rock & Alternative Songs (Billboard)	20

== Certifications ==
Cetifications and sales for "Ignorance"
Region	Certification	Certified units/sales
Australia (ARIA)	Platinum	70,000^{‡}
New Zealand (RMNZ)	Platinum	30,000^{‡}
United Kingdom (BPI)	Platinum	600,000^{‡}
United States (RIAA)	Gold	500,000^{‡}
^{‡} Sales+streaming figures based on certification alone.

== Release history ==
Release dates and formats for "Ignorance"
Region	Date	Format	Label(s)	Ref.
United States	September 1, 2009	Mainstream airplay	Fueled By Ramen	

== See also ==
- List of number-one rock hits of 2010 (UK)
