= The Only Exception =

2010 single by Paramore

Single by Paramore

from the album Brand New Eyes
- Released: February 17, 2010
- Studio: Lightning Sound (Hidden Hills, California)
- Genre: Soft rock; folk rock; acoustic rock
- Length: 4:28 (album version); 4:06 (radio edit)
- Label: Fueled by Ramen
- Songwriters: Hayley Williams; Josh Farro
- Producer: Rob Cavallo

Paramore singles chronology
"Brick by Boring Brick" (2009)	"The Only Exception" (2010)	"Careful" (2010)

Music video
- "The Only Exception" on YouTube

"The Only Exception" is a song by American rock band Paramore. It was released by Fueled by Ramen in February 2010 as the third single from the band's third studio album, Brand New Eyes (2009). The song was written by band members Hayley Williams and Josh Farro; Paramore is also credited as being co-producers to the song. The song was generally well received by music critics; praise of the song was mainly about Williams' vocal performance. Music critics reviewing the song noted that "The Only Exception" was a different musical theme for the band.

"The Only Exception" was the most successful single from Brand New Eyes, having topped the United Kingdom Rock Chart and peaked at No. 13 and No. 17 in New Zealand and Australia respectively. The single has become the band's third of five top-40 hits to date on the Billboard Hot 100. A music video for the song, directed by Brandon Chesbro, was released on February 17, 2010, via the band's official website. The song received a Grammy nomination for Best Pop Performance by a Duo or Group with Vocals. It was the band's most successful single until the release of "Ain't It Fun" (2014).

== Background ==
"The Only Exception" was released as the third single from the band's 2009 studio album Brand New Eyes in February 2010. Described as soft rock and folk rock, it was noticed by music critics that, Paramore, who usually write and record darker material, mainly of the alternative genre, had, musically, gone in a different direction with "The Only Exception". Rolling Stone described the song as "a subtle, Radiohead-esque ballad." The song's lyrics pertain to the protagonist not believing that love exists and trying to live without it, mainly to avoid rejection, but eventually realizing that it does exist, describing the person as being their "only exception". Many fans believe that the song was written as an ode to Chad Gilbert from New Found Glory. Williams has declined to comment directly on the issue, merely saying: "Read a couple blogs, and you'll figure it out."

Other themes include trying to pursue a relationship, as well as trying to make a relationship last, which can be seen in the lyrics, "I know you're leaving in the morning when you wake up / Leave me with some kind of proof it's not a dream". The single is written in the time signature of 6/8 and in the key of B major.

In 2024, Williams admitted that she was uncomfortable performing the song, after her divorce with Gilbert in 2017. However, her mind was changed during Paramore's 2024 run as the supporting act on Taylor Swift's The Eras Tour, after her vocal coach persuaded her to look at her partner and bandmate Taylor York while onstage performing the song. Williams said the following:

"I felt so stupid doing that at first. I felt stupid having this pure expression of adoration and tapping into the hopefulness I had as a 19-year-old. This tour completely changed my relationship with that song though. Now when I sing it, I feel happy."

== Critical reception ==
"The Only Exception" received generally positive reviews from contemporary music critics. Williams' vocal performance was mainly praised by music critics. Mikael Wood, a writer for Spin felt that "The Only Exception" was a "surprisingly soulful acoustic number" and compared its musical structure to Parachutes-era Coldplay. Wood commented that the song was an "upgrade" that consisted of "focus and intensity". Leonie Cooper of NME noted in his review for Brand New Eyes that Paramore were able to "showcase their maturity" with multiple ballad songs, specifying "The Only Exception". Cooper commented that while the song's lyrics seemed to be a "nondescript love song" that does not "quite warrant the abrupt change of pace", he praised Williams' vocals. Cooper further stated,

"[The song] feels like something Katy Perry would dismiss for being too lightweight, with its mechanical, campfire strumming and general uninspiring air. Its saving grace, however, comes with Williams' vocals, which are flawless and sturdy throughout. Even though the song gets soppy, she never does – weakness just ain't in this lady's repertoire, and for that we offer her a hefty high five."

Marc Hirsh of The Boston Globe listed "The Only Exception" as the highlight of Brand New Eyes, crediting the song as being an "essential". Hirsh said that "The Only Exception" is "probably the best place to start" with the album, describing Williams' vocals as "forging a connection" rather than "simply spitting out her feelings"; he also praised the other band members for locking in at a "sympathetic simmer". Channing Freeman of Sputnikmusic felt that "The Only Exception" had similarities to "The Boy Who Blocked His Own Shot" by Brand New. Freeman stated that on Paramore's All We Know Is Falling, "My Heart" was a "blunt and obvious song" that focused on a "climax to be emotional"; meanwhile, with "The Only Exception", Paramore have "figured out that it doesn't have to finish loud to incite a reaction in the listener". He also noted that the song shows that Williams' lyrics have "definitely improved". Jesse Catalodo of Slant felt that the lyrics to "The Only Exception" may be "irredeemably over-the-top" but its "vocal melodies are the stuff of perfect pop". The song has also been considered to be one of the greatest songs in the emo genre.

== Commercial performance ==
It peaked at number 12 on the Billboard component chart for Pop Songs; the song remained on the chart for twenty weeks. However, on the week of June 12, 2010, the song debuted at number ninety on the Billboard Hot 100. It has since peaked at No. 24, becoming (at the time) the most successful Paramore single overall (outside of alternative airplay – Misery Business remains their most-successful alternative-pop airplay single to date). It was their third top-40 hit in the US, preceding Still Into You and Ain't It Fun, which became their fourth and fifth top-40 hits, respectively. "The Only Exception" also became the band's first foray onto Adult Contemporary stations, peaking at number 28 on the component Billboard Adult Contemporary chart. The track was more successful internationally, peaking generally within the top 20 on multiple countries' charts. On the New Zealand RIANZ singles chart, it debuted at number 38 on February 22, 2010. The following week, the song moved up fifteen positions to number 23. The song peaked at number 13. After four weeks on the chart, "The Only Exception" peaked at number 2 on the United Kingdom's Rock Chart on March 14, 2010, staying at that position for three weeks but moving up to number 1 on the chart's issue date of April 5, 2010. The song entered the UK Singles Chart at number 80 on March 28, 2010. It peaked at number 31. The track peaked at number 47 in Austria on March 28, 2010. The single also debuted as its peak position, number 84, on the Eurochart Hot 100 Singles chart on April 24, 2010. "The Only Exception" debuted at number 59 on the Brazilian Hot 100 Airplay chart in June 2010, becoming the group's first single to enter the Brazilian charts, achieving position No. 32 in the following months.

== Music video ==
=== Background ===
Williams in the song's music video. In the scene Williams is shown lying on Valentine-themed cards while singing the song's chorus. The cards shown in the video were fan-made. Chesbro said that the scene was his favorite part of the video to film.

A music video for "The Only Exception" was directed by Brandon Chesbro, who had been working with Paramore for over two years. The song's music video was Chesbro's music video directorial debut. Prior to "The Only Exception" video, Chesbro had been approached to direct music videos for Brand New Eyes' two previous singles, but decided against it due to creative opinions. In December 2009, he was asked to direct the music video for "The Only Exception". Although the storyboard process took a while, the video was filmed in four days. The music video premiered on February 17, 2010, on Paramore's website. Williams confirmed that as part of a Valentine's Day theme, the band selected cards that were sent to them by fans and featured them in the video. In an interview with MTV, Chesbro commented on filming the scene involving Williams lying on Valentine's Day–styled cards during the music video, saying:

"The band has crazy fans. All those cards are so detailed [...] these kids spent serious time on these cards. That's my favorite shot of the whole video. It was the first thing we shot and I thought that if something falls apart and we only have that one shot, that could be the video all by itself and it'd be perfect."

=== Synopsis ===
The music video opens with Williams waking up on a couch next to an unnamed sleeping male and writes a note that says "I'm sorry". From there, she walks to a room and hugs her father, who is mentioned in song. A conversation ensues with Williams taking a photo of someone presumed to be her mother.

The video continues with Williams in her room staring at the photo on a mirror, singing about how love "does not exist." She moves through a costume closet, into a restaurant set, where a rotating cast of men pose as her date; then, she walks into the next room, where there is a wedding. Everyone at the wedding is wearing white, with the other band members in attendance, but Williams arrives dressed in black, and she flees the scene from where the bride enters.

During the chorus of the song, the clip cuts to the scenes where Williams is lying down on a giant pile of Valentine-themed cards. Throughout the video, clips of Williams singing with the rest of Paramore in a dimly lit background are shown.

In the video's final moments, Williams spots the same male she woke up to at the beginning of the video in the crowd at a rock show. After fantasizing of the two being together through all sets from the start of the video, she makes her way back through the various rooms to the original set in the beginning. When Williams sings "And I'm on my way to believing", she returns to the couch, where the male is still asleep, and hides the note she wrote in her pocket as she lies back down next to him.

=== Reception ===
The music video for "The Only Exception" was generally well received by music critics. Kyle Anderson, a writer for MTV, commented that the music video is "by far the most visually interesting and complex clip the group has ever produced." Anderson further stated that "despite the complexity of the video, the whole process was remarkably efficient". She remarked that based on the video's outcome that it was "a little bit surprising" to know that it was directed by a first-time director. Mike Sheffield of Spin viewed the music video as a "love story" and described it as being "Valentine's Day + epic Emo balladry = Paramore's brand new video for 'The Only Exception'". Chesbro said that he was happy with the final product of the music video and that directing the video made him become more interested in directing videos, saying: "I'd really like to do more videos now [...] This video turned out so perfect that I'm worried nothing else will turn out as good. But if this is my only video, I was super-proud to be a part of it."

== The Only Exception EP ==
The Only Exception

EP by Paramore
- Released: September 28, 2010
- Genres: Soft rock; folk rock
- Length: 13:29
- Label: Fueled by Ramen

Paramore chronology
2010 Summer Tour (2010)	The Only Exception (2010)	Singles Club (2011)

The Only Exception is Paramore's third EP, released exclusively to the iTunes Store on September 28, 2010.

=== Track listing ===
7" picture disc
No.	Title	Length
1.	"The Only Exception" (Album version)	4:28

The Only Exception EP
No.	Title	Length
1.	"The Only Exception" (Album version)	4:28
2.	"The Only Exception" (Acoustic)	4:33
3.	"The Only Exception" (Video)	4:28
Total length:		13:29

== In popular culture ==
=== Live performances ===
- Paramore performed a live version of "The Only Exception" for The Ellen DeGeneres Show.
- The band performed the chorus and outro of the song on the 2010 MTV Video Music Awards on September 12, 2010.
- Paramore performed "The Only Exception" in VH1 Divas 2010 with the song "Misery Business", "Decode" and "My Hero"
- The band performed "The Only Exception" at Jingle Ball in Madison Square Garden with the song "Misery Business" and "Brick by Boring Brick"

=== Other appearances ===
- The music video appears in Paramore's Videos. All of Them. Ever.
- The song appears in 2011 Grammy Nominees by the nominees in 53rd Grammy Awards.
- The song is heard in season 3, episode 11 of the television series Gossip Girl.

=== Covers ===
- Sam Tsui and Kurt Schneider made an acoustic cover of the song.
- April Chase covered the song, which had a music video directed and shot by Marco Bercasio.
- Rachel G. Fox did an acoustic cover of the song.
- Chris Ninni and Ben Hazlewood performed a cover of the song on The Voice Australia.
- Kelly Clarkson covered the song as part of her Stronger Tour.
- Masha covered "The Only Exception" on her popular YouTube channel on March 25, 2012.
- Julien Áncery did a cover of "The Only Exception" for Valentine's Day 2014.
- Blackpink's Rosé has twice covered the song for the South Korean reality show Sea of Hope.
- Regine Velasquez released her cover of the song on July 25, 2024.
- On June 10, 2025, Billie Eilish performed the song at a concert in Paris, France as part of Hit Me Hard and Soft: The Tour.

=== Glee cover ===
The song was performed in the Britney Spears–themed episode "Britney/Brittany" of the US television series Glee, which aired September 28, 2010. Lea Michele, in character as Rachel Berry, sang the song at the end of the episode as an apology to her boyfriend Finn Hudson, played by Cory Monteith. The performance was praised by most critics, with Rolling Stone's Erica Futterman calling it "gorgeous and tender" and Entertainment Weekly's Tim Stack praising it as the episode's "nice, emotional capper". Williams complimented Michele's vocals on the rendition through her Twitter account. The cover was released as a single and charted at number 22 in both Canada and Ireland, 26 in the US, and 60 in Australia, with sales of 89,000 copies in the US, according to Nielsen SoundScan.

=== Rock Band music gaming platform ===
The song was made available for download on May 15, 2012, to play in Rock Band 3 Basic and PRO mode utilizing real guitar / bass guitar, and MIDI-compatible electronic drum kits / keyboards plus vocal harmonies. It is also playable in Rock Band Blitz.

== Personnel ==
The following personnel contributed to "The Only Exception":

Production

- Rob Cavallo – producer
- Paramore – co-producer
- Chris Lord-Alge – mixing
- Ted Jensen – mastering
- Doug McKean – engineering
- Jamie Muhoberac – keyboards, organ

Paramore

- Hayley Williams – lead vocals, harmony vocals
- Josh Farro – rhythm guitar, acoustic guitar, backing vocals
- Taylor York – lead guitar, acoustic guitar
- Jeremy Davis – bass guitar
- Zac Farro – drums, percussion

== Charts ==
=== Weekly charts ===
Weekly chart performance for "The Only Exception"
Chart (2010–2026)	Peak position
Australia (ARIA)	17
Canada Hot 100 (Billboard)	25
Canada CHR/Top 40 (Billboard)	27
Canada Hot AC (Billboard)	32
European Hot 100 Singles (Billboard)	72
Ireland (IRMA)	28
Mexico Ingles Airplay (Billboard)	5
New Zealand (Recorded Music NZ)	13
Philippines Hot 100 (Billboard Philippines)	43
Scottish Singles Sales (Official Charts)	25
UK Singles (Official Charts)	31
UK Rock & Metal (Official Charts)	1
US Billboard Hot 100	24
US Pop Airplay (Billboard)	12
US Adult Pop Airplay (Billboard)	9
US Adult Contemporary (Billboard)	28

=== Monthly charts ===
Monthly chart performance for "The Only Exception"
Chart (2010)	Peak position
Brazil (Brasil Hot 100 Airplay)	39
Brazil (Brasil Hot Pop Songs)	13

=== Year-end charts ===
Year-end chart performance for "The Only Exception"
Chart (2010)	Position
Australia (ARIA)	75
US Billboard Hot 100	93
US Adult Top 40 (Billboard)	37

Chart (2025)	Position
Philippines (Philippines Hot 100)	76

== Certifications ==
Certifications and sales for "The Only Exception"
Region	Certification	Certified units/sales
Australia (ARIA)	2× Platinum	140,000^{‡}
New Zealand (RMNZ)	3× Platinum	90,000^{‡}
United Kingdom (BPI)	Platinum	600,000^{‡}
United States (RIAA)	2× Platinum	2,000,000^{‡}
^{‡} Sales+streaming figures based on certification alone.

== See also ==
- List of number-one rock hits of 2010 (UK)
- List of number-one rock hits of 2011 (UK)
