= Monster (Paramore song) =

Single by Paramore

from the album Transformers: Dark of the Moon – The Album and Singles Club EP
- Released: June 7, 2011
- Recorded: March 2011
- Genre: Emo
- Length: 3:18
- Label: Fueled by Ramen; Warner
- Songwriters: Hayley Williams; Taylor York
- Producer: Rob Cavallo

Paramore singles chronology
"Playing God" (2010)	"Monster" (2011)	"Now" (2013)

Music video
- "Monster" on YouTube

"Monster" is a song by American rock band Paramore. It was released on June 7, 2011 for digital download. It is also the second single from the Transformers: Dark of the Moon OST, which was released on June 14, 2011. It is the first song to not feature former band members Josh and Zac Farro, who separated from the band in 2010. The song won Choice Rock Track at the 2011 Teen Choice Awards. On March 24, 2016, the song was certified gold by the Recording Industry Association of America (RIAA), for sales exceeding 500,000.

Taylor York performed the drum parts for the track.

== Composition and release ==
James Montgomery of MTV noted the number of times that the word "you" is used in the lyrics of "Monster" because of its subjectivity. He suggested that the song is about former members of the group Josh and Zac Farro, since they left the band in 2010 and it is the first track without them. Entertainment Weekly stated that, while the song is "a tad slugier than their usual fare", it is "exactly the dark, tighly-constructed emo you would expect. According to Jon Blistein of Billboard, the song has elements of grunge, such as loud-soft dynamics, big vocals, and loud, crunchy guitars.

Around the release of "Monster", Williams commented on the track: "We're back for the attack! And we are so excited to be a part of the Transformers album. Tell your friends… Paramore is still a band." The song impacted radio on June 21, 2011. A video companion to "Monster" was recorded in Los Angeles and was uploaded to YouTube on July 18 . The single cover was described by Becky Bain, as containing the three members of Paramore, Hayley Williams, Jeremy Davis and Taylor York, standing in a dark tunnel where a light at the end faces the band.

== Music video ==
The music video was directed by Shane Drake, who has directed some of Paramore's previous music videos. On July 15, the band's official website posted a video via YouTube of a 19-second clip previewing the music video. It was premiered on MTV.com July 18 at 12:00 Midnight and at 6am on MTV 2.

The video opens with Hayley, Taylor and Jeremy unconscious and floating on water. Hayley opens her eyes and begins to sing as the video cuts to the band performing in a concrete room while kicking and punching the walls. Other scenes show each of the band members alone and wandering through an abandoned hospital building. The kicking and punching from the band performing causes violent explosions around the members in the hospital and all three proceed to run away. The three eventually meet up in a foyer and continue running away together before ducking into the concrete room in which they were performing earlier.

The video was shot in an abandoned hospital called "Linda Vista" in Los Angeles, California. Linda Vista Hospital is known for its many appearances on ghost-hunting television shows. According to Hayley Williams "It was not just good acting, it was fear. Genuine fear."

== Commercial performance ==
Its first appearance was week 24/2011 in the UK Singles Top 75 and New Zealand Top 40. Its peak position was number 21, on the UK Singles Top 75, it stayed there for 1 week, and 23 in New Zealand Top 40. "Monster" also debuted and peaked at #36 on the Billboard Hot 100.

== Charts ==
Chart performance for "Monster"
Chart (2011–12)	Peak positions
Australia (ARIA)	56
Canada Hot 100 (Billboard)	55
New Zealand (Recorded Music NZ)	23
Scottish Singles Sales (Official Charts)	13
UK Singles (Official Charts)	21
UK Rock & Metal (Official Charts)	22
US Billboard Hot 100	36
US Hot Rock & Alternative Songs (Billboard)	38

== Certifications ==
Certifications for "Monster"
Region	Certification	Certified units/sales
United Kingdom (BPI)	Silver	200,000^{‡}
United States (RIAA)	Gold	500,000^{‡}
^{‡} Sales+streaming figures based on certification alone.
