= Hayley Williams discography =

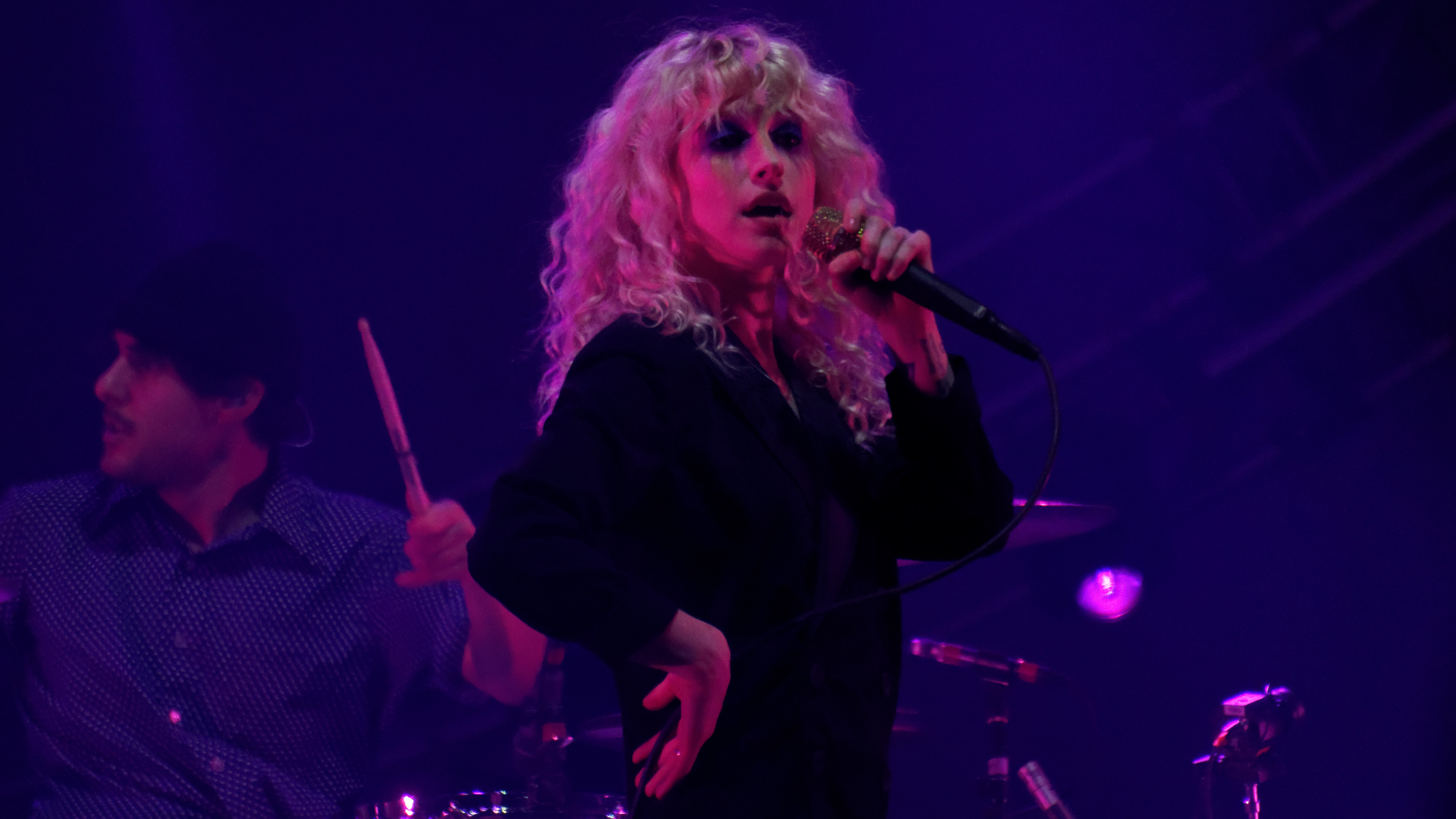
- Williams performing at The O2, in London, in January 2018
- Studio albums: 3
- EPs: 3
- Singles: 15
- Music videos: 5

American singer and songwriter Hayley Williams has released three studio albums, three extended plays, and 12 singles. All three of her studio albums debuted in the Billboard 200. As a separate career being a solo artist, she was featured on six songs. She also appeared to various artists as a guest appearance credited up to 25 songs. Being in the American rock band Paramore, she has released six studio albums, five extended plays, two live albums, and one remix album with the band.

Williams' debut album Petals for Armor released in 2020 was met with critical acclaim and charted in various countries, while her sophomore album Flowers for Vases / Descansos was a surprise release the following year (2021) with positive reception. Her third studio album was released on 2025, initially she released 17 unannounced various tracks from her website which was then wiped out before putting them up together which later became Ego Death at a Bachelorette Party which charted in various countries and received widespread acclaim from music critics.

== Studio albums ==
List of studio albums, with selected details
Title	Details	Peak chart positions									
Title	Details	US	AUS	AUT	BEL (FL)	GER	IRE	NZ	POR	SCO	UK
Petals for Armor	Released: May 8, 2020; Label: Atlantic; Formats: CD, digital download, streaming, LP, cassette	18	6	51	117	24	38	24	21	1	4
Flowers for Vases / Descansos	Released: February 5, 2021; Label: Atlantic; Formats: CD, digital download, streaming, LP	189	—	—	—	—	—	—	—	18	92
Ego Death at a Bachelorette Party	Released: August 28, 2025; Label: Post Atlantic; Formats: CD, digital download, streaming, LP	12	17	—	146	62	28	12	14	1	10
"—" denotes a release that did not chart.

== Extended plays ==
List of extended plays, with selected details
Title	Details	Peak chart positions		
Title	Details	US Current Sales	US Heat.	UK DL
Petals for Armor I	Released: February 6, 2020; Label: Atlantic; Format: Digital download, streaming	79	19	—
Petals for Armor II	Released: April 21, 2020; Label: Atlantic; Format: Digital download, streaming	—	—	91
Petals for Armor: Self-Serenades	Released: December 18, 2020; Label: Atlantic; Format: Digital download, 10" EP, streaming	—	—	—
"—" denotes a release that did not chart.

== Singles ==
=== As lead artist ===
List of singles, with selected chart positions, showing year released and album
Title	Year	Peak chart positions						Album
Title	Year	US Alt.	US Rock	CAN Rock	NZ Hot	SCO	UK Sales	Album
"Simmer"	2020	— (Note: "Simmer" did not enter the Hot Alternative Songs chart, but peaked at number 21 on the Alternative Airplay chart.)	7	—	—	54	1	Petals for Armor
"Leave It Alone"	2020	—	39	—	—	—	—	Petals for Armor
"Roses/Lotus/Violet/Iris"	2020	—	—	—	—	—	—	Petals for Armor
"Over Yet"	2020	— (Note: "Over Yet" did not enter the Hot Alternative Songs chart, but peaked at number 25 on the Alternative Digital Song Sales chart.)	—	—	—	—		Petals for Armor
"My Friend"	2020	—	—	—	—	—	—	Petals for Armor
"Why We Ever"	2020	—	—	—	—	—	—	Petals for Armor
"Dead Horse"	2020	—	36	—	—	—	—	Petals for Armor
"Teardrop"	2021	—	—	—	—	—	—	Non-album singles
"Colour Me In"	2021	—	—	—	—	—	—	Non-album singles
"I Like It I Like It" (with Moses Sumney)	2025	—	—	—	—	—	—	Non-album singles
"True Believer"	2025	— (Note: "True Believer" did not enter the Hot Alternative Songs chart, but peaked at number 1 on the Alternative Digital Song Sales chart.)	— (Note: "True Believer" did not enter the Hot Rock & Alternative Songs chart, but peaked at number five on the Rock Digital Song Sales chart and at number 25 on the Digital Song Sales.)	—	—	—	—	Ego Death at a Bachelorette Party
"Glum"	2025	—	—	—	32	—	—	Ego Death at a Bachelorette Party
"Parachute"	2025	24	28	39	15	—	—	Ego Death at a Bachelorette Party
"Open the Door" (with David Byrne)	2025	—	—	—	—	—	—	The Twits
"Ceiling" (with Turnstile)	2026	—	—	—	—	—	—	Never Enough: Versions
"—" denotes a release that did not chart or was not released in that territory.

=== As featured artist ===
List of singles as lead artist, with selected chart positions and certifications, showing album name and year released
Title	Year	Peak chart positions										Certifications	Album
Title	Year	US	AUS	AUT	CAN	GER	IRE	ITA	NZ	SWI	UK	Certifications	Album
"Airplanes" (B.o.B featuring Hayley Williams)	2010	2	2	2	2	8	2	10	1	5	1	RIAA: Diamond; ARIA: 3× Platinum; BPI: 3× Platinum; BVMI: 2× Platinum; FIMI: Platinum; MC: 2× Platinum; RMNZ: 4× Platinum	B.o.B Presents: The Adventures of Bobby Ray
"Stay the Night" (Zedd featuring Hayley Williams)	2013	18	11	20	22	15	8	13	20	56	2	RIAA: Platinum; ARIA: 3× Platinum; BPI: Platinum; BVMI: Gold; FIMI: Gold; RMNZ: Platinum	Clarity
"Vicious Love" (New Found Glory featuring Hayley Williams)	2015	—	—	—	—	—	—	—	—	—	—		Resurrection: Ascension
"Bury It" (Chvrches featuring Hayley Williams)	2016	—	—	—	—	—	—	—	—	—	—		Every Open Eye
"Uncomfortably Numb" (American Football featuring Hayley Williams)	2019	—	—	—	—	—	—	—	—	—	—		American Football
"What Is the Reason for It?" (David Byrne with Ghost Train Orchestra featuring Hayley Williams)	2025	—	—	—	—	—	—	—	—	—	—		Who Is the Sky?
"Past Lives" (Jay Som featuring Hayley Williams)	2025	—	—	—	—	—	—	—	—	—	—		Belong
"The Rising Skyline" (Failure featuring Hayley Williams)	2026	—	—	—	—	—	—	—	—	—	—		Location Lost
"Closer" (The Linda Lindas featuring Hayley Williams)	2026	—	—	—	—	—	—	—	—	—	—		Gotta Get Out
"—" denotes a release that did not chart or was not released in that territory.

== Other charted and songs ==
Charting songs from Hayley Williams
Title	Year	Peak chart positions										Album
Title	Year	US	US Dig.	US Alt. Dig.	US Rock	AUS	CAN	GRE	NZ	UK Stream	WW	Album
"Rainbow Connection" (with Weezer)	2011	—	—	13	— (Note: "Rainbow Connection" did not enter the Hot Rock & Alternative Songs chart, but peaked at number 23 on the Rock Digital Song Sales chart.)	—	—	—	—	—	—	Muppets: The Green Album
"My Limb"	2021	—	—	—	—	—	—	—	— (Note: "My Limb" did not enter the New Zealand Top 40 Singles Chart, but peaked at number 40 on the New Zealand Hot Singles Chart.)	—	—	Flowers for Vases / Descansos
"Castles Crumbling" (Taylor Swift featuring Hayley Williams)	2023	31	36	—	—	33	42	87	30	54	30	Speak Now (Taylor's Version)
"Good Ol' Days"	2025	—	—	—	41	—	—	—	— (Note: "Good Ol' Days" did not enter the New Zealand Top 40 Singles Chart, but peaked at number 27 on the New Zealand Hot Singles Chart.)	—	—	Ego Death at a Bachelorette Party
"—" denotes a release that did not chart.

== Guest appearances ==
List of guest appearances showing year released and album name
Title	Year	Other artist(s)	Album
"Keep Dreaming Upside Down"	2006	October Fall	A Season in Hell
"Then Came to Kill"	2007	The Chariot	The Fiancée
"The Church Channel"	2007	Say Anything	In Defense of the Genre
"Plea"	2007	Say Anything, Kenny Vasoli	In Defense of the Genre
"Fallen"	2008	Death in the Park	Death in the Park EP
"Tangled Up"	2009	New Found Glory	Not Without a Fight
"The Few That Remain"	2009	Set Your Goals	This Will Be the Death of Us
"Teenagers"	2009	—N/a	Jennifer's Body: Music from the Motion Picture
"Airplanes, Part II"	2010	B.o.B, Eminem	B.o.B Presents: The Adventures of Bobby Ray
"Fallen"	2010	Death in the Park	Death in the Park
"Rainbow Connection"	2011	Weezer	Muppets: The Green Album
"Fox's Dream of the Log Flume"	2012	MewithoutYou	Ten Stories
"All Circles"	2012	MewithoutYou, Daniel Smith	Ten Stories
"Babe"	2012	What's Eating Gilbert	Nashville Session
"What's His Name"	2012	Domestikated	Five Minutes in Timeout!
"Wearing Your Ring"	2015	What's Eating Gilbert	That New Sound You're Looking For
"As U Wave"	2017	HalfNoise	The Velvet Face EP
"Nineteen"	2017	Tegan and Sara	Tegan and Sara Present The Con X: Covers
"Castles Crumbling (Taylor's Version) (From the Vault)"	2023	Taylor Swift	Speak Now (Taylor's Version)
"Seein' Stars"	2025	Turnstile	Never Enough
"What Is the Reason for It?"	2025	David Byrne	Who Is the Sky?
"Past Lives"	2025	Jay Som	Belong
"Friends or Lovers"	2025	Rusty Williams	Grand Man
"Open the Door"	2025	David Byrne	The Twits
"The Rising Skyline"	2026	Failure	Location Lost
