= "The Hayley Williams Show" =

Ongoing second world tour by Hayley Williams

- World tour by Hayley Williams
- Location: Europe; North America; South America
- Associated albums: Ego Death at a Bachelorette Party; Flowers for Vases / Descansos; Petals for Armor
- Start date: September 3, 2026
- End date: July 3, 2027
- Legs: 3
- No. of shows: 53
- Supporting acts: Annie DiRusso; Magdalena Bay; Mannequin Pussy; Rico Nasty

Hayley Williams concert chronology
- Hayley Williams at a Bachelorette Party (2026); "The Hayley Williams Show" (2026–2027)

The Hayley Williams Show (officially stylized as "The Hayley Williams Show") is a concert tour by American singer-songwriter Hayley Williams. The tour began on September 3, 2026, in West Palm Beach and will end on July 3, 2027, in London.

== Background ==
The tour was initially announced in April 2026 with shows in New York City, Los Angeles, and São Paulo. On May 7, 2026, shows in North and Latin America were announced with Magdalena Bay, Rico Nasty, and Annie DiRusso as openers. Williams stated that the tour would have "a very different set or different energy" than her previous performances.

On September 1, 2026, Williams announced a European leg of the tour. On September 18, 2026, Williams announced two shows on the tour in Australia. On November 11, 2026, four shows in Asia were announced.

A dollar from each ticket sold in North America was donated to the environmental and food sustainability organizations Reverb and Support+Feed and $1 from each ticket sold in Latin America was donated to food access and climate initiatives in the region.

== Critical reception ==
Writing for Rolling Stone, Larisha Paul praised Williams' vocal performance on the tour as "hair-raising". Paul praised the show's political themes, noting that she played songs from Macklemore, Lukas Graham, Finneas, Aaron Rowe, and Beoga during the pre-show in reference to the Macklemore–Ed Sheeran tour controversy, shouted "Fuck ICE" and "Free Palestine" during "Ice In My OJ", and encouraged fans to vote in the November 2026 elections.

== Set list ==
This set list is representative of the show on September 3, 2026 in West Palm Beach.

1. "Just a Lover"
2. "Over Yet"
3. "Simmer" (with snippet of "Wandering Star" by Portishead)
4. "Creepin'"
5. "Ice In My OJ"
6. "Kill Me"
7. "Hard"
8. "My Friend"
9. "Leave It Alone"
10. "Roses/Lotus/Violet/Iris"
11. "True Believer" (Nina Simone cover)
12. "Cinnamon"
13. "Dead Horse"
14. "Pure Love"
15. "Crystal Clear"
16. "Ego Death at a Bachelorette Party"
17. "Glum"
18. "Disappearing Man"
19. "Dream Girl in Shibuya"
20. "Good Ol' Days"
21. "Just a Lover" (Reprise)
22. "Mirtazapine"
23. "Brotherly Hate"
24. "Parachute"

Alterations

- September 14, 2026 – Gilford: "Showbiz" in place of "Brotherly Hate".
- September 17, 2026 – New York City: "Airplanes" with Rico Nasty.
- October 5, 2026 – Los Angeles: "Stay the Night" with Zedd.
- October 12, 2026 – Southhaven: "Miss Black America" with KIRBY and Big K.R.I.T.

== Tour dates ==
List of 2026 concerts
Date	City	Country	Venue	Opening act(s)
September 3	West Palm Beach	United States	iTHINK Financial Amphiteatre	Magdalena Bay; Rico Nasty
September 5	Alpharetta	United States	Ameris Bank Amphitheatre	Magdalena Bay; Rico Nasty
September 6	Charleston	United States	Credit One Stadium	Magdalena Bay; Rico Nasty
September 8	Charlotte	United States	Truliant Amphitheater	Magdalena Bay; Rico Nasty
September 9	Raleigh	United States	Walnut Creek Amphitheatre	Magdalena Bay; Rico Nasty
September 11	Boston	United States	Xfinity Center	Magdalena Bay; Rico Nasty
September 12	Saratoga Springs	United States	Albany Med Health System at SPAC	Magdalena Bay; Rico Nasty
September 14	Gilford	United States	BankNH Pavilion	Magdalena Bay; Rico Nasty
September 16	Queens	United States	Forest Hills Stadium	Magdalena Bay; Rico Nasty
September 17	Queens	United States	Forest Hills Stadium	Magdalena Bay; Rico Nasty
September 19	Detroit	United States	Pine Knob Music Theatre	Magdalena Bay; Rico Nasty
September 23	Cincinnati	United States	Riverbend Music Center	Magdalena Bay; Rico Nasty
September 24	Tinley Park	United States	Credit Union 1 Amphitheatre	Magdalena Bay; Rico Nasty
September 26 (Note: As part of All Things Go Music Festival)	Columbia	United States	Merriweather Post Pavilion	—N/a
September 30	Seattle	United States	White River Amphitheatre	Magdalena Bay; Rico Nasty
October 2	Mountain View	United States	Shoreline Amphitheatre	Magdalena Bay; Rico Nasty
October 3	San Diego	United States	North Island Credit Union Amphitheatre	Magdalena Bay; Rico Nasty
October 5	Los Angeles	United States	Hollywood Bowl	Magdalena Bay; Rico Nasty
October 6	Los Angeles	United States	Hollywood Bowl	Magdalena Bay; Rico Nasty
October 9	Houston	United States	Cynthia Woods Mitchell Pavilion	Magdalena Bay; Rico Nasty
October 10	New Orleans	United States	Champions Square	Magdalena Bay; Rico Nasty
October 12	Southaven	United States	BankPlus Amphitheater	Magdalena Bay; Rico Nasty
November 9	Rio de Janeiro	Brazil	Qualistage	Annie DiRusso
November 12	São Paulo	Brazil	Espaço Unimed	Annie DiRusso
November 13	São Paulo	Brazil	Espaço Unimed	Annie DiRusso
November 15	Buenos Aires	Argentina	Estadio Malvinas Argentinas	Annie DiRusso
November 18	Santiago	Chile	Movistar Arena	Annie DiRusso
November 21	Lima	Peru	Costa 21	Annie DiRusso
November 23	Bogotá	Colombia	Movistar Arena	Annie DiRusso
November 26	Mexico City	Mexico	Auditorio Nacional	Annie DiRusso
November 28	San Juan	United States of America	Coca-Cola Music Hall	Annie DiRusso

List of 2027 concerts
Date	City	Country	Venue	Opening act(s)
January 13	Mexico City	Mexico	Auditorio Nacional	Mannequin Pussy
January 15	Monterrey	Mexico	Auditorio Banamex	Mannequin Pussy
January 17	Guadalajara	Mexico	Auditorio Telmex	Mannequin Pussy
February 10	Sydney	Australia	Enmore Theatre	TBA
February 12 (Note: As part of Laneway Festival Sydney.)	Sydney	Australia	Centennial Park	—N/a
February 13 (Note: As part of Laneway Festival Brisbane.)	Brisbane	Australia	Brisbane Showgrounds	—N/a
February 17	Melbourne	Australia	Forum Theatre	TBA
February 19 (Note: As part of Laneway Festival Melbourne.)	Melbourne	Australia	Flemington Park	—N/a
February 21 (Note: As part of Laneway Festival Auckland.)	Auckland	New Zealand	Western Springs Stadium	—N/a
February 24	Manila	Philippines	TBA	—N/a
February 26	Singapore		TBA	—N/a
March 1	Seoul	South Korea	TBA	—N/a
March 3	Tokyo	Japan	TBA	—N/a
June 7	Milan	Italy	Carraponte	—N/a
June 8	Rome	Italy	Cavea Auditorium Parco della Musica	—N/a
June 14	Brussels	Belgium	Forest National	—N/a
June 16	Paris	France	Zénith Paris - La Villette	—N/a
June 17	Amsterdam	Netherlands	AFAS Live	—N/a
June 23	Glasgow	Scotland	OVO Hydro	—N/a
June 26 (Note: As part of Slane Festival in support of Fontaines D.C.)	Slane	Ireland	Slane Castle	—N/a
June 27	Slane	Ireland	Slane Castle	—N/a
June 30	Cardiff	Wales	Utilita Arena	TBA
July 2	London	England	Alexandra Palace	TBA
July 3	London	England	Alexandra Palace	TBA
