= Hayley Williams at a Bachelorette Party =

2026 concert tour

- World tour by Hayley Williams
- Location: Europe; North America
- Associated album: Ego Death at a Bachelorette Party
- Start date: March 28, 2026
- End date: June 30, 2026
- Legs: 2
- No. of shows: 43
- Supporting acts: Water from Your Eyes; Snuggle; Tiberius b

Hayley Williams concert chronology
- Hayley Williams at a Bachelorette Party (2026); "The Hayley Williams Show" (2026–2027)

Hayley Williams at a Bachelorette Party (full name: Good Dye Young Presents: Hayley Williams at a Bachelorette Party) is the first solo concert tour by American singer-songwriter Hayley Williams, launched in support of her third studio album, Ego Death at a Bachelorette Party (2025), in partner with her hair dye company, Good Dye Young. The tour was announced five years after the Petals for Armor Tour being cancelled due the COVID-19 pandemic in 2020 and took place in cities across the United States, Europe, and United Kingdom, with bands Water From Your Eyes, Snuggle, and musician Tiberius b as supporting acts.

The first batch of tour dates, with 29 shows, were announced on November 10, 2025, with 16 more shows being added two days after due to the overwhelming demand. Tickets to all shows sold out almost immediately after the sale begin.

Attempting to make tickets more accessible and affordable, a partnership with the platform Openstage happened, aiming to host verified presale registration, hoping to combat bots and scalpers from purchasing tickets for tour dates.

== Background and development ==
Following the release of Flowers for Vases / Descansos (2021), Williams returned her focus to Paramore, contributing to the band's sixth studio album This Is Why (2023) and its subsequent world tour. During this period, Williams also continued expanding her haircare company Good Dye Young, released new episodes of her BBC Sounds series Everything Is Emo, and made occasional guest appearances in concerts of artists including Turnstile and David Byrne.

On November 10, 2025, Williams announced Good Dye Young Presents: Hayley Williams At A Bachelorette Party, her first-ever solo headlining tour, scheduled to begin in early 2026. The initial itinerary included dates across the United States, Europe and the United Kingdom, with Water From Your Eyes, Snuggle, and Tiberius b announced as supporting acts on select dates. Two days later, additional performances were added after the initial presale registration exceeded expectations.

Daniel James was the musical director, Zach Chafin worked with the sound effects, and lighting and stage design was by designer Tobias Rylander.

== Live band ==
Williams was joined on stage by a 4-piece live band - this exact line-up (also called the "ParaFour") has previously performed with Paramore during the This Is Why touring cycle (from 2022 to 2024). In addition to singing lead vocals, Williams also plays electric and acoustic guitars, piano, and a drum machine/sampler on stage.

- Brian Robert Jones – guitar, backing vocals
- Joey Howard – bass guitar, synth bass, backing vocals
- Joseph Mullen – drums, percussion
- Logan MacKenzie – guitar, keyboards, backing vocals

== Set list ==
The set list for this tour is composed of all the songs from Ego Death at a Bachelorette Party, but not in the same order as on the album, and a Nina Simone cover. Songs were played in the same order during all tour, with additions to the set in special occasions. The last three songs were played as an encore.

1. "Mirtazapine"
2. "Showbiz"
3. "Disappearing Man"
4. "Zissou"
5. "Ice in My OJ"
6. "Hard"
7. "Kill Me"
8. "Blood Bros"
9. "Ego Death at a Bachelorette Party"
10. "Whim"
11. "Glum"
12. "Negative Self Talk"
13. "True Believer"
14. "Don't Let Me Be Misunderstood" (Nina Simone cover; snippet)
15. "Brotherly Hate"
16. "Love Me Different"
17. "Dream Girl in Shibuya"
18. "Good Ol' Days"
19. "Discovery Channel"
20. "I Won't Quit on You"
21. "Parachute”

The tour also had the same two tracks played before the show started: "Vivid Light" by Blood Orange and "Army of Me" by Björk. The first song played after the end of the event was "My Boo (Hitman's Club Mix)" by Ghost Town DJ’s.

== Tour dates ==
List of 2026 concerts
Date	City	Country	Venue	Opening act(s)
March 27	Atlanta	United States	Tabernacle	Water from Your Eyes
March 28	Atlanta	United States	Tabernacle	Water from Your Eyes
March 31	Toronto	Canada	Massey Hall	Water from Your Eyes
April 1	Toronto	Canada	Massey Hall	Water from Your Eyes
April 3	Boston	United States	Citizens House of Blues	Water from Your Eyes
April 4	Boston	United States	Citizens House of Blues	Water from Your Eyes
April 6	Philadelphia	United States	Franklin Music Hall	Water from Your Eyes
April 7	Philadelphia	United States	Franklin Music Hall	Water from Your Eyes
April 9	New York City	United States	Hammerstein Ballroom	Water from Your Eyes
April 10	New York City	United States	Hammerstein Ballroom	Water from Your Eyes
April 12	New York City	United States	Hammerstein Ballroom	Water from Your Eyes
April 14	Baltimore	United States	The Lyric	Water from Your Eyes
April 15	Silver Spring	United States	The Fillmore	Water from Your Eyes
April 17	Minneapolis	United States	The Fillmore	Water from Your Eyes
April 18	Minneapolis	United States	The Fillmore	Water from Your Eyes
April 21	Chicago	United States	Byline Bank Aragon Ballroom	Water from Your Eyes
April 22	Chicago	United States	Byline Bank Aragon Ballroom	Water from Your Eyes
April 25	Nashville	United States	Ryman Auditorium	Water from Your Eyes
April 27	Nashville	United States	Ryman Auditorium	Water from Your Eyes
April 28	Nashville	United States	Ryman Auditorium	Water from Your Eyes
May 2	Austin	United States	ACL Live at The Moody Theater	Water from Your Eyes
May 3	Austin	United States	ACL Live at The Moody Theater	Water from Your Eyes
May 5	Phoenix	United States	The Van Buren	Water from Your Eyes
May 7	Oakland	United States	Fox Theater	Water from Your Eyes
May 9	Oakland	United States	Fox Theater	Water from Your Eyes
May 10	Oakland	United States	Fox Theater	Water from Your Eyes
May 12	Los Angeles	United States	The Wiltern	Water from Your Eyes
May 13	Los Angeles	United States	The Wiltern	Water from Your Eyes
May 15	Los Angeles	United States	The Wiltern	Water from Your Eyes
June 5	Milan	Italy	Alcatraz	Snuggle
June 8	Amsterdam	Netherlands	Paradiso	Water from Your Eyes
June 10	Cologne	Germany	Live Music Hall	Snuggle
June 11	Cologne	Germany	Live Music Hall	Snuggle
June 15	Berlin	Germany	Tempodrom	Water from Your Eyes
June 16	Copenhagen	Denmark	Poolen	Water from Your Eyes
June 19	London	England	Roundhouse	Water from Your Eyes; Tiberius b
June 20	London	England	Roundhouse	Water from Your Eyes; Tiberius b
June 22	Manchester	England	Academy 1	Water from Your Eyes
June 23	Manchester	England	Academy 1	Water from Your Eyes
June 26	Glasgow	Scotland	O2 Academy	Water from Your Eyes
June 27	Glasgow	Scotland	O2 Academy	Water from Your Eyes
June 29	Dublin	Ireland	National Stadium	Water from Your Eyes
June 30	Dublin	Ireland	National Stadium	Water from Your Eyes
