= Warren Fu =

American director

- Born: Chicago, Illinois, U.S.
- Occupation: Music video director
- Website: www.warrenfu.com

Warren Fu is an American music video director, illustrator and designer. He has directed videos for artists such as the Weeknd, Daft Punk, Pharrell Williams, The Strokes, the Killers, Hayley Williams, Mark Ronson and Julian Casablancas. Fu is signed to Partizan Entertainment worldwide for commercials and music videos, and Creative Artists Agency for feature films. He was also responsible for designing the concept art for General Grievous, one of the main antagonists in Star Wars Episode III: Revenge of the Sith.

== Videography ==
=== Music videos ===
2026

- Laufey - "Madwoman"
- The Strokes - "Lonely in the Future"

==== 2025 ====
- King Princess - “RIP KP” (credited as Your Mom/Wazza Fu)

==== 2024 ====
- Megan Thee Stallion featuring RM - "Neva Play" (Co-directed with Carl Jones)
- Billy Joel - "Turn the Lights Back On" (Co-directed with Freddy Wexler)

==== 2023 ====
- Daft Punk featuring Julian Casablancas and The Voidz - "Infinity Repeating (2013 Demo)"

==== 2022 ====
- Maggie Rogers - "That's Where I Am"
- Maggie Rogers - "Want Want"
- Phoenix - “Winter Solstice”

==== 2021 ====
- Doja Cat featuring SZA - "Kiss Me More"
- Shakira - "Don't Wait Up"

==== 2020 ====
- Tom Petty - "Something Could Happen"
- Dua Lipa featuring DaBaby - "Levitating"
- The Strokes - "Ode to the Mets"
- Hayley Williams - "Cinnamon"
- Hayley Williams - "Leave It Alone"
- Hayley Williams - "Simmer"

==== 2019 ====
- Zedd and Kehlani - "Good Thing"
- The 1975 - "People"
- Gesaffelstein & Pharrell Williams - "Blast Off"
- Rex Orange County - "10/10"
- Zedd and Katy Perry - "365"

==== 2018 ====
- The 1975 - "It's Not Living (If It's Not with You)"
- The 1975 - "Sincerity Is Scary"
- Chvrches - "Miracle"
- A Tribe Called Quest - "The Space Program"
- Paramore - "Rose-Colored Boy"

==== 2017 ====
- Phoenix - "J-Boy"
- The Weeknd feat. Daft Punk - "I Feel It Coming"
- Lo Moon - "Loveless"

==== 2016 ====
- The Growlers - "I'll Be Around"
- The Strokes - "Threat of Joy"
- Rey Pila - "Surveillance Camera"
- Chvrches - "Clearest Blue"

==== 2015 ====
- Jeff Lynne's ELO - "When I Was a Boy"
- Jehnny Beth + Julian Casablancas - "Boy/Girl"
- Julian Casablancas+The Voidz - "Human Sadness" (Co-directed with Nicholaus Goossen)
- Snoop Dogg feat. Stevie Wonder, Pharrell Williams - "California Roll"
- Brandon Flowers - "Still Want You"
- My Dear - "Better Dance"

==== 2014 ====
- Weezer - "Back to the Shack"
- Har Mar Superstar - "Restless Leg" (Co-directed with Michelle Zamora)
- Haim - "If I Could Change Your Mind"

==== 2013 ====
- Daft Punk - "Get Lucky"
- Daft Punk and Julian Casablancas - "Instant Crush"
- The Killers - "Just Another Girl"
- Daft Punk - "Lose Yourself to Dance"
- Exclamation Pony - "Pseudo Individual"
- The Virgins - "Travel Express"
- Har Mar Superstar - "Lady You Shot Me"
- The Virgins - "Prima Materia"
- Depeche Mode - "Soothe My Soul"

==== 2012 ====
- The Killers - "Miss Atomic Bomb"
- The Killers - "Runaways"
- The Darkness - "Everybody Have a Good Time"
- The Darkness - "With a Woman"
- Nero - "Must Be the Feeling"

==== 2011 ====
- The Kooks - "Is It Me"
- The Kooks - "Junk of the Heart (Happy)"
- The Strokes - "Under Cover of Darkness"

==== 2010 ====
- Daft Punk - "Derezzed"
- Mark Ronson - "Bang Bang Bang"
- Mark Ronson - "The Bike Song"

==== 2009 ====
- Julian Casablancas - "11th Dimension"

==== 2008 ====
- Little Joy - "No One's Better Sake"

==== 2007 ====
- The Strokes - "You Only Live Once" (Alternate version)

==== 2001 ====
- Aaliyah - "Aaliyah Album Promo"
