= Flowers for Vases / Descansos =

Studio album by Hayley Williams
- Released: February 5, 2021
- Studios: Williams' home (Nashville, Tennessee)
- Genres: Folk; indie folk
- Length: 42:30
- Label: Atlantic
- Producer: Daniel James

Hayley Williams chronology
Petals for Armor: Self-Serenades (2020)	Flowers for Vases / Descansos (2021)	Ego Death at a Bachelorette Party (2025)

Flowers for Vases / Descansos (stylized as FLOWERS for VASES / descansos) is the second studio album by American singer-songwriter and Paramore frontwoman Hayley Williams. It was released through Atlantic Records on February 5, 2021. Departing from the rock and pop sounds more in line with the singer's past work, Flowers for Vases is an intimate and more stripped-down folk album. Williams is the sole writer and performer on the album.

== Background ==
The genesis of this album occurred during the COVID-19 pandemic, which began shortly before the release of Williams's first solo record Petals for Armor and led to the cancellation of its corresponding tour.

Being her second studio album, Williams said of Flowers for Vases / Descansos: "This isn't really a follow-up to [Petals For Armor]. If anything, it's a prequel or some sort of detour between [Petals for Armor I] and [Petals for Armor II]." Though this album is Williams's first without any collaboration from her Paramore bandmates, she states that they were supportive of her in the making of this project.

== Writing and composition ==
Flowers for Vases / Descansos is Williams's most personal work, touching on themes such as heartbreak, grief, and her struggles with depression. The track "Inordinary," specifically, tackles some of Williams's early life events such as her and her mother fleeing from an abusive stepfather to Nashville in 2002, before going on to touch on deeper themes of belonging. Because of these subject matters, Williams has said that the album is hard for her to listen to, with her also saying of the album:

"It is so raw and so of the moment, but it also is such a culmination of all the lessons I've learned throughout multiple relationships that just [...] felt like my own body was eating itself."

Similarly to Petals for Armor, many of the songs draw inspiration from Williams's relationship and separation from musician Chad Gilbert. The artist's reaction to the COVID-19 pandemic was also a major influence on the project. Williams has herself compared this work to Taylor Swift's 2020 album Folklore.

== Title and artwork ==
The title of the album was initially to be solely Descansos, however Williams was inspired by an entry on her grocery list that read "flowers for vases." According to the singer, this phrase had a weight to it, as it represented her breathing vitality back into her life by way of replacing the withered flowers in her home.

The second half of the album's name, "descansos," translating to "rest" in Spanish, is a word used to describe a roadside memorial, normally placed at the site of an unexpected and sudden death. Williams states that the use of the word in the album title was inspired by the book Women Who Run with the Wolves by author Clarissa Pinkola Estés. According to Williams:

“The author talks about how we make our own descansos when we have little deaths throughout our life, [and how] we have to leave something behind but we keep living. We honor where we were, and then we move on.”

The album cover depicts Williams in a pool of water with strong red lighting. The songwriter, who often uses water metaphors to describe relationships in her music, has stated that the inspiration for this artwork stems from her often having dreams about water, including more violent dreams involving drowning. The image was taken in a jacuzzi that Williams cites as her "most ridiculous quarantine purchase," and it was photographed by creative director Lindsey Byrnes, with Williams also crediting Paramore lead guitarist Taylor York with "[jacuzzi] lighting assistance."

== Recording and production ==
Due to the COVID-19 lockdowns, the album was recorded entirely in Williams's home in Nashville, Tennessee, and as such, she plays all instruments heard on the album, including vocals, guitar, bass guitar, piano, and drums.

Outside of the instruments played by Williams, ambient audio recordings can also be heard on the songs "Good Grief" and the album's title track "Descansos." According to Williams, these recordings originate from VHS tapes of her first Halloween.

Daniel James, most known for his project Canon Blue, engineered and produced the album. He and Williams have collaborated in the past, with him having written string arrangements for Paramore's 2017 record After Laughter. Carlos de la Garza, who has similarly worked with Williams before, also served as an engineer.

== Release ==
While the album did not have any singles, an earlier version of the track "Find Me Here" was included as one of the three songs on Williams's acoustic extended play (EP) Petals for Armor: Self-Serenades, which was released in December 2020.

The track entitled "My Limb" was also partially released. On the night of January 28, 2021, coinciding with that year's Wolf Moon, Williams hand-delivered a CD containing the song to a fan, giving them permission to leak its contents. More teasers also appeared around this time, with Williams's website displaying cryptic imagery and demo snippets, along with her mailing doll limbs to fans with a note reading "plant me."

Williams only formally announced Flowers for Vases / Descansos the day prior to its release, on February 5, 2021, making it a surprise album. She did so via an Instagram story, where she also clarified that though the development of this album was completely independent from them, "yes, Paramore is still a band." The album also received a vinyl release seven months later on September 10, 2021, with two editions being made available at the time.

== Critical reception ==
Professional ratings
Aggregate scores
Source	Rating
AnyDecentMusic?	7.2/10
Metacritic	79/100
Review scores
Source	Rating
AllMusic	4/5 stars
The A.V. Club	B
Consequence of Sound	B
DIY	4.5/5 stars
Entertainment Weekly	B+
Exclaim!	8/10
Kerrang!	3/5
The Line of Best Fit	7/10
NME	4/5 stars
Pitchfork	6.8/10

The album was met with a positive reception. According to the review aggregator Metacritic, Flowers for Vases / Descansos received "generally favorable reviews" based on a weighted average score of 79 out of 100 from 15 critic scores. The New York Times praised the album, calling it "finely polished," further saying that "every vocal phrase, guitar tone, piano note and studio effect has been thought through by Williams and her engineer and producer, Daniel James." Rolling Stone gave the album three and a half stars, describing it as "delicate" and stating that Williams has "codified what a top-to-bottom quarantine album can sound like," however also noting that "its commitment to confessional storytelling and stripped-down production the whole way through will make it appear one-noted against [Petals for Armor]."

Accolades for Flowers for Vases / Descansos
Publication	Accolade	Rank
Blunt	Half-Year Review: The 10 (and a Half) Best Albums of 2021 So Far	5
Chorus.fm	The Best Albums of 2021 (So Far)	8
The Guardian	The 50 Best Albums of 2021	39
i-D	15 of the Best Albums of 2021 So Far	—N/a
Official Charts	The Best Songs and Albums of 2021 So Far: Official Charts Staff Picks	—N/a
Rolling Stone	The Best Albums of 2021 So Far	—N/a
Spin	The 30 Best Albums of 2021 (So Far)	—N/a

== Track listing ==
All tracks are written by Hayley Williams.

No.	Title	Length
1.	"First Thing to Go"	2:59
2.	"My Limb"	2:53
3.	"Asystole"	3:05
4.	"Trigger"	4:04
5.	"Over Those Hills"	3:12
6.	"Good Grief"	2:38
7.	"Wait On"	3:10
8.	"KYRH"	2:34
9.	"Inordinary"	4:44
10.	"HYD"	3:42
11.	"No Use I Just Do"	2:09
12.	"Find Me Here"	2:11
13.	"Descansos"	1:59
14.	"Just a Lover"	3:03
Total length:		42:29

== Personnel ==
- Hayley Williams – all instruments, all vocals, writer
- Daniel James – producer, engineer
- Carlos de la Garza – mixing
- Heba Kadry – mastering
- Denyse Tontz – mix engineering assistant
- Lindsey Byrnes – creative direction, photography

== Charts ==
Chart performance for Flowers for Vases / Descansos
Chart (2021)	Peak position
Scottish Albums (Official Charts)	18
UK Albums (Official Charts)	92
US Billboard 200	189
US Top Alternative Albums (Billboard)	21
US Top Rock Albums (Billboard)	33
