= The Twits (soundtrack) =

The Twits (Soundtrack from the Netflix Film)

Soundtrack album by David Byrne and Oli Julian
- Released: October 17, 2025
- Recorded: 2025
- Genre: Film soundtrack; film score
- Length: 53:21
- Label: Netflix Music
- Producer: David Byrne; Oli Julian

David Byrne chronology
Who Is the Sky? (2025)	The Twits (2025)

Oli Julian chronology
Amandaland (2025)	The Twits (2025)	Fackham Hall (2025)

Singles from The Twits (Soundtrack from the Netflix Film)
- 1. "Open the Door" Released: October 10, 2025

The Twits (Soundtrack from the Netflix Film) is the soundtrack album to the 2025 film The Twits directed by Phil Johnston. The album featured original songs written and composed by American musician David Byrne and original score composed by Oli Julian. It was released through Netflix Music on October 17, 2025.

== Development ==
=== Score ===
The Twits marked Oli Julian's first film scoring assignment for a feature animation. Julian joined the project during mid-2025 as the film's animation continued for two years. Since he read the original novel as a child multiple times and having read to his own kids, he felt it as "a huge honor and a privilege to be able to, to contribute in some small way to the canon of material." When he discussed with the director during production, they felt fairly free to move it in the direction they wanted to as there was no right direction to mimic Roald Dahl and each adaptation of his work so far has been quite different.

Having worked for a charity that helps in music education for kids, he noted that kids like interesting and new sounds and wanted to make that soundscape fresh and interesting as possible, by experimenting with different sounds to keep the children hooked. Hence, Julian came up with unique sonic signature for different characters like putting bass clarinet through a "wah-wah" pedal for the frog and sweet-toed toad and an electric guitar wailing sound for Mr. Napkin. Julian noted it as an only piece of music which was rock or metal in any way, calling it a great "one-off moment to do something entirely different from the rest of the score". While the Twits had been a spooky and grotesque, the film presented them in a cuter and more emotional connection with those creatures and characters.

In developing the film's score, he utilized some unexpected instruments as the backbone. He wrote the score with musical saw and jaw harp as the foundation of the score, though Julian did not play that instrument. He found that the musical saw was the instrument got him the gig. After demonstrating the idea at an online interaction with the musical team in Zoom, he tried to play that instrument during the session which he felt he played it badly but successfully demonstrated. He felt the sound of the saw had purity in it, but also it can do "weird, out-of-tune, wonky, shonky oddness" that worked for the Twits. The jaw harp was used for other characters called Flobnorbles. To blend all those disparate instrumentations, he settled into the kind of "orchestral Americano" which utilizes orchestra along with strings, guitars, banjos and instruments that felt rooted in Americana based on scale and scope of the film.

=== Songs ===
David Byrne wrote and composed four original songs for the film. Johnston wrote a letter as an invitation for him to collaborate as he admired Byrne's works. Inspired by that, Byrne met Johnston where the latter discussed about the story and he dug deeper into the characters. He recorded a demo of "Not Like Everyone Else" where Byrne sang and played the banjo. Byrne written those songs even before Julian was involved, and the team worked on animating his songs before he started scoring. But Julian and Byrne discussed when the former became onboard and aligned in terms with the kind of instrumentation and score. Though he had not heard his songs at that stage, he had done few demos and were quite similar in instrumentation and tone. They further collaborated a bit more, where he and Julian decided to meld the songs and score.

Julian used a kids' choir on the score, especially with the Muggle-Wumps where he further wanted to bring the same people into the lullaby song that Muggle-Wumps sing. Hence, he did an arrangement for the choir for his song, while also arranging brass and strings for "Problem is You". Julian added that he started the score in 2020 when it was developed into a series but did not expand it fully until 2023. He recalled on writing the demos for the scenes that imagined for the television series but never made into the final film. However, in terms of tone and vibe, his score did not affect Byrne's songs, and the instrumentation and style were settled from the beginning.

== Release ==
The first single from the film "Open the Door", featuring vocals performed by David Byrne and Hayley Williams, released on October 10, 2025. The soundtrack was released through Netflix Music on October 17, 2025.

== Reception ==
Richard Lawson of The Hollywood Reporter noted "The small handful of spare original songs, by David Byrne no less, do not make much of an impression." Peter Debruge of Variety wrote "It's even got songs, courtesy of David Byrne, none of them catchy enough to live on beyond the confines of the film" and found Oli Julian's score to be "unimpressive". Kanak Nopany of IGN India wrote "Even the songs don't add much to the story, they're quirky but not memorable. They are written by David Byrne, but honestly, you wouldn't believe it if you don't see the credits."

== Track listing ==
No.	Title	Artist(s)	Length
1.	"Open the Door"	David Byrne and Hayley Williams	3:21
2.	"We're Not Like Ev'ryone Else"	Margo Martindale and Euan Morton	2:49
3.	"The Problem Is You"	Margo Martindale and Euan Morton	1:46
4.	"Lullaby"	Natalie Portman	2:05
5.	"Not Normal People"	Oli Julian	0:59
6.	"Muggle-Wumps Discovered"	Oli Julian	2:02
7.	"Muggle-Wumps Escape"	Oli Julian	1:03
8.	"Sweet Toed Toad"	Oli Julian	1:22
9.	"Cook You in a Pie"	Oli Julian	0:46
10.	"Condemned Park"	Oli Julian	0:31
11.	"Florbnorbles"	Oli Julian	0:50
12.	"Trick Me"	Oli Julian feat. Lloyd Wade	2:57
13.	"The Twits Steal Loos"	Oli Julian	0:37
14.	"Magical Tears"	Oli Julian	1:39
15.	"Muggle-Wump Party"	Oli Julian	1:26
16.	"Back in Business"	Oli Julian	1:47
17.	"The Twits Get Arrested"	Oli Julian	1:11
18.	"Riot"	Oli Julian	0:48
19.	"I've Got Your Back"	Oli Julian	1:40
20.	"The Twits Scheme"	Oli Julian	1:17
21.	"Hiding Under the Bed"	Oli Julian	1:00
22.	"The Twits on the Stairs"	Oli Julian	1:05
23.	"Mouldy Leftovers"	Oli Julian	0:55
24.	"The Twits Bake a Cake"	Oli Julian	0:35
25.	"Beesha Comes Back"	Oli Julian	2:50
26.	"Not on My Watch"	Oli Julian	0:56
27.	"Voice Changer 30000"	Oli Julian	0:48
28.	"Stealing the Orphanage"	Oli Julian	1:57
29.	"Family Toad"	Oli Julian	0:45
30.	"Twitlandia"	Erika Dapkewicz	0:56
31.	"The Twit Family Extravaganza"	Oli Julian	0:43
32.	"Making an Escape"	Oli Julian	1:02
33.	"Honest Twits"	Oli Julian	0:58
34.	"Fireworks"	Oli Julian feat. Ella Taylor	0:54
35.	"Upside Down"	Oli Julian	2:52
36.	"The Dreaded Shrinks"	Oli Julian	0:48
37.	"Saving the Twits"	Oli Julian	1:05
38.	"Hate Is Easy"	Oli Julian	0:39
39.	"Goodbye to the Twits"	Oli Julian	1:56
Total length:			53:21
