= Annie DiRusso =

American indie rock musician

Ann Claire DiRusso is an American indie rock musician based in Nashville, Tennessee.

== Career ==
DiRusso released her first two songs, "Gone/Blue Walls," in 2017. DiRusso's third song was released in 2018 titled "Dead Dogs". DiRusso released her fourth song in 2018 titled "Don't Swerve." Also in 2018, DiRusso released a song titled "Jonathan." DiRusso released her song "20" in 2020. In Late 2020, DiRusso released "Judgements From The World’s Greatest Band." In March 2021, DiRusso released the song "Nine Months," and it became a viral hit on TikTok. In July 2021, DiRusso released a cover of Tommy James and the Shondells, "I Think We're Alone Now." In August of the same year, DiRusso released "Coming Soon" which also went viral on TikTok and has amassed nearly ten million streams on Spotify. In April 2022, DiRusso released "Infinite Jest." In August 2022, she released "Call It All Off." In November, DiRusso released "Nauseous," the first single from her debut EP. The second single, "Emerson" was released in February 2023. DiRusso's debut EP titled "God, I Hate This Place" was released on February 24, 2023. She followed up the release of the EP with the release of her debut album Super Pedestrian on March 7, 2025.

== Personal life ==
DiRusso grew up in Croton-on-Hudson, New York. She is queer.

== Discography ==
=== Albums ===
Title	Details
Super Pedestrian	Released: March 7, 2025; Label: Summer Soup Songs; Formats: Digital download, streaming, vinyl

=== Extended plays ===
Title	Details
God, I Hate This Place	Released: February 24, 2023; Label: Annie DiRusso / Good Partners; Formats: Digital download, streaming, vinyl

=== Singles ===
Year	Title	Album/EP
2017	"Gone"	Non-album singles
2017	"Blue Walls"	Non-album singles
2018	"Dead Dogs"	Non-album singles
2018	"Don't Swerve"	Non-album singles
2018	"Jonathan"	Non-album singles
2020	"20"	Non-album singles
2020	"Judgements From The World’s Greatest Band"	Non-album singles
2021	"Nine Months"	Non-album singles
2021	"I Think We're Alone Now"	Non-album singles
2021	"Coming Soon"	Non-album singles
2022	"Infinite Jest"	Non-album singles
2022	"Call It All Off"	Non-album singles
2022	"Nauseous"	God, I Hate This Place
2023	"Emerson"	God, I Hate This Place

== Tours ==
Headlining

- God, I Love This Tour (2023)

Supporting

- Declan McKenna - Zeros Tour USA (2022)
- Samia - Loving You Thanking You Tour (2021)
- Peach Pit (band) - (2024)
- The Beaches (band) - No Hard Feelings Tour (2025)
