= Petals for Armor II =

EP by Hayley Williams
- Released: April 21, 2020
- Recorded: 2019–20
- Studio: East Iris Studios; Music Friends
- Length: 20:16
- Label: Atlantic
- Producer: Taylor York; Hayley Williams; Daniel James

Hayley Williams chronology
Petals for Armor I (2020)	Petals for Armor II (2020)	Petals for Armor (2020)

Singles from Petals for Armor II
- 1. "Roses/Lotus/Violet/Iris" Released: March 19, 2020; 2. "Over Yet" Released: April 2, 2020; 3. "My Friend" Released: April 9, 2020; 4. "Why We Ever" Released: April 16, 2020; 5. "Dead Horse" Released: April 21, 2020

Petals for Armor II is the second solo extended play (EP) by American singer-songwriter and Paramore frontwoman Hayley Williams. It was released on Atlantic Records on April 21, 2020, as the second in a series of releases in the Petals for Armor era. Williams explained the inspiration behind its title is due to her belief that "the best way for me to protect myself is to be vulnerable."

Petals for Armor II was produced by Williams' Paramore bandmate Taylor York and was written throughout 2019 during Paramore's hiatus after touring in support of their fifth studio album, After Laughter (2017). The lead single, "Roses/Lotus/Violet/Iris", was released on March 19, 2020.

== Background ==
Following extensive touring in support of Paramore's fifth studio album After Laughter (2017), Hayley Williams expressed her feelings about the group's future moving forward explaining that they were not breaking up, however needed time away from writing and touring. In an interview with BBC Radio, in January 2020, Williams explained her process behind developing Petals for Armor.

"I'm so ready and so incredibly humbled to get to share this project... Making it was a scary, empowering experience. Some of my proudest moments as a lyricist happened while writing 'PETALS FOR ARMOR.' And I was able to get my hands a little dirtier than usual when it came to instrumentation. I'm in a band with my favorite musicians so I never really feel the need to step into a role as a player when it comes to Paramore records. This project, however, benefited from a little bit of musical naïveté and rawness and so I experimented quite a bit more. I made this with some of the closest people to me. Their respective talents really shine bright throughout the record. I like to think we all make each other better and the result is something that sounds and FEELS exactly as I'd hoped it would. Now that it's time to put it all out there, I can finally exhale. I'm excited to let people in to experience a different side of myself that I've only very recently become familiar with."

== Singles ==
"Roses/Lotus/Violet/Iris" was released to digital download and streaming platforms as the lead single on March 19, 2020.

== Track listing ==
No.	Title	Writer(s)	Length
1.	"Dead Horse"	Hayley Williams; Daniel James	3:19
2.	"My Friend"	Williams; Joey Howard	3:39
3.	"Over Yet"	Williams; Howard; Steph Marziano	3:34
4.	"Roses/Lotus/Violet/Iris"	Williams; Taylor York; James	5:21
5.	"Why We Ever"	Williams; Micah Tawlks	4:23
Total length:			20:16

== Credits and personnel ==
Musicians

- Hayley Williams – primary artist, lead vocals, keyboards, guitar
- Taylor York – production, additional instrumentation
- Joey Howard – bass guitar, keyboards
- Aaron Steele – drums, percussion, congas
- Benjamin Kaufman – violin, chin cello

Additional personnel

- Daniel James – string arrangements, additional production
- Julien Baker – background vocals
- Phoebe Bridgers – background vocals
- Lucy Dacus – background vocals
- Carlos de la Garza – mixing engineer
- Dave Cooley – mastering engineer
- Kevin "K-Bo" Boettger – assistant engineer
- Michael Craver – assistant engineer, assistant mixing engineer
- David Fitzgibbons – assistant engineer, assistant mixing engineer
- Michelle Freetly – assistant engineer
- Jake Butler – assistant engineer
