= Petals for Armor =

2020 studio album by Hayley Williams

Studio album by Hayley Williams
- Released: May 8, 2020
- Recorded: 2019–2020
- Studios: East Iris (Nashville); Music Friends (Los Angeles) (Note: Except "Why We Ever", recorded at Pep Talk (Nashville), East Iris and Music Friends; and "Watch Me While I Bloom", recorded at Sunset Sound (Los Angeles) and Music Friends)
- Genres: Art pop; experimental pop; art rock; synth-pop
- Length: 55:49
- Label: Atlantic
- Producer: Taylor York

Hayley Williams chronology
Petals for Armor II (2020)	Petals for Armor (2020)	Petals for Armor: Self-Serenades (2020)

Singles from Petals for Armor
- 1. "Simmer" Released: January 22, 2020; 2. "Dead Horse" Released: April 21, 2020

Petals for Armor is the debut solo studio album by American singer-songwriter Hayley Williams. It was released on May 8, 2020, by Atlantic Records. The album was preceded by two extended plays, Petals for Armor I and Petals for Armor II, which make up the album's first ten songs.

Williams explained the inspiration behind the title of the album is due to her belief that "the best way for me to protect myself is to be vulnerable." The album was produced by Williams' Paramore bandmate Taylor York and was written throughout 2019 during Paramore's hiatus after touring in support of their fifth studio album, After Laughter (2017).

The album was supported by its lead single, "Simmer", which was released in January 2020, accompanied with its music video. In an interview with BBC Radio, Williams confirmed that she was to embark on a tour in support of Petals for Armor following its release. The tour was originally planned to begin in mid-2020 but was postponed and subsequently canceled in light of the COVID-19 pandemic.

== Background ==
Following extensive touring in support of Paramore's fifth studio album After Laughter (2017), Williams expressed her feelings about the group's future moving forward explaining that they were not breaking up, however needed time away from writing and touring. In an interview with BBC Radio, in January 2020, Williams explained her process behind developing the album.

“I'm so ready and so incredibly humbled to get to share this project... Making it was a scary, empowering experience. Some of my proudest moments as a lyricist happened while writing ‘PETALS FOR ARMOR.’ And I was able to get my hands a little dirtier than usual when it came to instrumentation. I'm in a band with my favorite musicians so I never really feel the need to step into a role as a player when it comes to Paramore records. This project, however, benefited from a little bit of musical naïveté and rawness and so I experimented quite a bit more. I made this with some of the closest people to me. Their respective talents really shine bright throughout the record. I like to think we all make each other better and the result is something that sounds and FEELS exactly as I'd hoped it would. Now that it's time to put it all out there, I can finally exhale. I'm excited to let people in to experience a different side of myself that I’ve only very recently become familiar with.”

== Composition ==
Williams stated that the album initially began as a casual endeavor to "write a bunch of R&B songs for fun", before it developed into a fully realized project. Petals for Armor is largely a soft pop and R&B-influenced album, exploring R&B, funk, and pop. Rolling Stone Australia described it as containing remnants "of the disco-funk grooves" from Paramore's then-latest studio album, After Laughter. However, Caryn Ganz of The New York Times described it as far removed from that project's "crunchy guitars" and "bouncy new wave", replacing it with "intricate and ominous layers, neck-snapping funk, dizzying industrial electro, glitter-pop reveries".

Lucy O'Toole of Hot Press said that despite sharing some elements with Paramore's pop-punk sound, Petals for Armor largely defies genre classification, "instead carving out a unique, somewhat eccentric art-pop sound" that draws from R&B. Pitchfork's Jenn Pelly described it as consisting of "introspective art-pop songs". Both O'Toole and Pelly agreed that Williams borrows inspiration from Björk and Radiohead, while Pelly observed that she is equally indebted to "the ’80s pop-R&B of Janet Jackson". Sam Walker-Smart of Clash observed that the final third of Petals for Armor is "poppier" than the rest of the album, with some tracks such as "Pure Love" and "Taken" embracing R&B, and the latter accompanied by a "slight bossa nova rhythm". According to Jolie Lash of Spin, the album "never quite returns" to any other genre by the time Williams embodies 1980s-influenced R&B on "Pure Love", and Lindsay Zoladz of The New York Times described the third part of the album as "sultry, R&B-tinged".

== Promotion and release ==
=== Singles ===
In December 2019, Williams announced on her birthday that she would be releasing a "taste" of new solo music in January 2020. Williams revealed the song title on social media on January 20, 2020, after posting various teasers over the course of January which featured a "dark aesthetic", with one including a person running through the woods. On January 22, 2020, Hayley Williams released the lead single "Simmer", the song was written by Williams, Paramore touring musician Joseph Howard, and guitarist Taylor York.

The album's second single, "Dead Horse" was released on April 21, 2020. "'Dead Horse' offers strength back to a younger, weaker version of myself," Williams continues. "I feel like all of this needed to be said in order to embody the kind of woman I hope to be." The music video was released on May 8. It was directed by Zac Farro.

=== Promotional singles ===
==== Singles for Petals for Armor I ====
"Leave It Alone" was released on January 30, 2020, by Atlantic Records for digital download and to streaming platforms and serves as the second single for Williams' debut solo EP, Petals for Armor I. The song was written by Williams and Joseph Howard and was produced by Taylor York. The music video for "Leave It Alone" was directed by Warren Fu and serves as a sequel to its predecessor "Simmer". It premiered on the same day as the single's release. Another music video, "Leave It Alone Interlude", premiered on February 3, 2020.

"Cinnamon" was released on February 6, 2020, as a third single from her Petals for Armor I project along with the EP's release. The music video for "Cinnamon" was directed by Warren Fu and serves as a sequel to its predecessor "Leave It Alone".

==== Singles for Petals for Armor II ====
"Roses/Lotus/Violet/Iris" was released on March 19, 2020, with an official lyric video. The song features indie rock band Boygenius, which consists of Julien Baker, Phoebe Bridgers, and Lucy Dacus, on background vocals. A music video for the song was written and set to be directed by actress Kristen Stewart, though plans fell through due to the COVID-19 pandemic. Williams said about the single in her Twitter account:

“In honor of my personal journey through femininity, with its endless facets; and in honor of the feminine wonder that connects literally everyone and everything.”

Williams also released the songs "Over Yet", "My Friend" and "Why We Ever".

=== Cancelled tour ===
Petals for Armor Tour
- World tour by Hayley Williams
- Promotional tour poster with dates
- Location: Europe; North America
- Associated album: Petals for Armor
- Start date: May 13, 2020
- End date: June 29, 2020
- Legs: 2
- No. of shows: 22 expected (Tour cancelled due to COVID-19 pandemic)
- Supporting acts: The Ninth Wave; Arlo Parks

Hayley Williams concert chronology
- Petals for Armor Tour (2020; cancelled); Hayley Williams at a Bachelorette Party (2026)

Planned to take place alongside the release of album, on March 5, 2020, Williams announced the European and North American legs of the Petals for Armor Tour, set to start in May 13 in Amsterdam, Netherlands and conclude on June 29, 2020, in Nashville, United States. The pre-sale started on March 13, 2020. It was announced that the support acts would be English R&B artist Arlo Parks on the North American leg and Scottish band the Ninth Wave in Europe. However, in August 2020, Williams announced that the tour was already cancelled due to the COVID-19 pandemic and that there were "no immediate plans to schedule new dates".

Via an Instagram story posted by Williams on her 36th birthday on December 27, 2024, the artist announced plans to play the cancelled solo shows in 2025, five years after their original timeframe.

==== List of planned shows ====
List of planned concerts, including date, city, country, and venue
Date	City	Country	Venue	Cancellation reason(s)
May 13, 2020	Amsterdam	Netherlands	Melkweg Max	COVID-19 pandemic
May 15, 2020	Brighton	England	The Great Escape	COVID-19 pandemic
May 16, 2020	London	England	Electric Brixton	COVID-19 pandemic
May 18, 2020	Paris	France	La Cigale	COVID-19 pandemic
May 19, 2020	Cologne	Germany	Live Music Hall	COVID-19 pandemic
May 28, 2020	Seattle	United States	Moore Theatre	COVID-19 pandemic
May 30, 2020	San Francisco	United States	Masonic Auditorium	COVID-19 pandemic
June 1, 2020	Los Angeles	United States	The Wiltern	COVID-19 pandemic
June 3, 2020	Denver	United States	Paramount Theatre	COVID-19 pandemic
June 5, 2020	Dallas	United States	The Hifi	COVID-19 pandemic
June 6, 2020	Houston	United States	House of Blues	COVID-19 pandemic
June 8, 2020	Orlando	United States	House of Blues	COVID-19 pandemic
June 10, 2020	Atlanta	United States	Tabernacle	COVID-19 pandemic
June 15, 2020	Charlotte	United States	The Fillmore	COVID-19 pandemic
June 17, 2020	Silver Spring	United States	The Fillmore	COVID-19 pandemic
June 18, 2020	Philadelphia	United States	The Fillmore	COVID-19 pandemic
June 20, 2020	Boston	United States	House of Blues	COVID-19 pandemic
June 22, 2020	Toronto	Canada	Rebel	COVID-19 pandemic
June 24, 2020	Brooklyn	United States	Brooklyn Steel	COVID-19 pandemic
June 26, 2020	Chicago	United States	House of Blues	COVID-19 pandemic
June 27, 2020	Detroit	United States	The Fillmore	COVID-19 pandemic
June 29, 2020	Nashville	United States	Brooklyn Bowl	COVID-19 pandemic

== Critical reception ==
Professional ratings
Aggregate scores
Source	Rating
AnyDecentMusic?	8.1/10
Metacritic	83/100
Review scores
Source	Rating
AllMusic	4/5 stars
Clash	8/10
Consequence of Sound	B+
The Daily Telegraph	3/5 stars
The Observer	3/5 stars
The Independent	4/5 stars
NME	4/5 stars
Pitchfork	7.2/10
Rolling Stone	4/5 stars
The Times	3/5 stars

Petals for Armor was met with critical acclaim. At Metacritic, which assigns a normalized rating out of 100 to reviews from professional publications, the album received an average score of 83, based on 22 reviews, indicating "universal acclaim". Aggregator AnyDecentMusic? gave it 8.1 out of 10, based on their assessment of the critical consensus.

=== Year-end lists ===
Year-end rankings of Petals for Armor
Publication	Accolade	Rank	Ref.
Billboard	Top 50 Best Albums of 2020	41	
Consequence of Sound	Top 50 Albums of 2020	21	
Entertainment Weekly	Top 15 Albums of 2020	15	
The Line of Best Fit	Top 50 Albums of 2020	36	
Rolling Stone	The 50 Best Albums of 2020	31	
Slant Magazine	Top 50 Albums of 2020	48	

== Track listing ==
All tracks are written by Hayley Williams and Joey Howard, except where noted.

No.	Title	Writer(s)	Length
1.	"Simmer"	Williams; Howard; Taylor York	4:26
2.	"Leave It Alone"		4:05
3.	"Cinnamon"	Williams; York	3:31
4.	"Creepin'"	Williams; Howard; Steph Marziano	2:58
5.	"Sudden Desire"		3:07
6.	"Dead Horse"	Williams; Daniel James	3:19
7.	"My Friend"		3:39
8.	"Over Yet"	Williams; Howard; Marziano	3:39
9.	"Roses/Lotus/Violet/Iris"	Williams; James; York	5:18
10.	"Why We Ever"	Williams; Micah Tawlks	4:23
11.	"Pure Love"		3:07
12.	"Taken"	Williams; Howard; Marziano	2:46
13.	"Sugar on the Rim"	Williams; York	4:14
14.	"Watch Me While I Bloom"	Williams; James; York	3:44
15.	"Crystal Clear"	Williams; York	3:33
Total length:			55:49

Japanese bonus track
No.	Title	Writer(s)	Length
16.	"Simmer" (Caroline Polachek remix)	Williams; Howard; York	3:16
Total length:			59:05

- "Crystal Clear" contains music from "Friends or Lovers" by her grandfather, Rusty Williams.

== Credits and personnel ==
Credits were adapted from liner notes.

Musicians

- Hayley Williams – vocals; guitar (tracks: 1, 3, and 4); keyboards (tracks: 1, 3, 4, 7, 8, 10–13, and 15); drums (track: 3)
- Aaron Steele – drums (tracks: 1–12); programming (track: 1); congas (tracks: 2, 9, and 11); percussion (tracks: 2 and 9)
- Joey Howard – bass (tracks: 1–12, and 15); keyboards (tracks: 1, 2, 4, 5, 7, 9, 11, and 12); percussion (track: 2); guitar (track: 4); programming (tracks: 5 and 7)
- Taylor York – additional instrumentation (all tracks)
- Daniel James – string arrangements (tracks: 2 and 9)
- Benjamin Kaufman – violin (tracks: 2 and 9); chin cello (tracks: 2 and 9)
- Steph Marziano – keyboards (tracks: 4 and 8); programming (tracks: 4 and 8)
- Mike Weiss – guitar (track: 4)
- Julien Baker – background vocals (track: 9)
- Phoebe Bridgers – background vocals (track: 9)
- Lucy Dacus – background vocals (track: 9)
- Zac Farro – drums (tracks: 14 and 15)
- Brian Robert Jones – bass (track: 14)
- Rusty Williams – vocals (track: 15); piano (track: 15)

Producers and engineers

- Taylor York – production
- Carlos de la Garza – mixing, engineering, additional production (tracks: 8, 11, 12, 14, and 15)
- Dave Cooley – mastering
- Michael Craver – mixing assistance, studio assistance
- David Fitzgibbons – mixing assistance, studio assistance
- Kevin Boettger – studio assistance
- Michelle Freetly – studio assistance
- Jake Butler – studio assistance
- Steph Marziano – additional production (tracks: 4 and 8)
- Daniel James – additional production (tracks: 4–6, 8, 9, and 14)
- Joey Howard – additional production (track: 7)
- Micah Tawlks – additional production (track: 10); engineering (track: 10)

Artwork

- Lindsey Byrnes – creative direction, photography
- Alex Mata – design, layout

== Charts ==
Chart performance for Petals for Armor
Chart (2020)	Peak position
Australian Albums (ARIA)	6
Austrian Albums (Ö3 Austria)	51
Belgian Albums (Ultratop Flanders)	117
Belgian Albums (Ultratop Wallonia)	200
German Albums (Offizielle Top 100)	24
Irish Albums (Official Charts)	38
New Zealand Albums (RMNZ)	24
Portuguese Albums (AFP)	21
Scottish Albums (Official Charts)	1
UK Albums (Official Charts)	4
US Billboard 200	18

== Petals for Armor: Self-Serenades ==
Petals for Armor: Self-Serenades

EP by Hayley Williams
- Released: December 18, 2020
- Recorded: 2020
- Length: 11:04
- Label: Atlantic
- Producer: Daniel James

Hayley Williams chronology
Petals for Armor (2020)	Petals for Armor: Self-Serenades (2020)	Flowers for Vases / Descansos (2021)

Petals for Armor: Self-Serenades is an extended play (EP) containing acoustic versions of two songs from Petals for Armor, and one new song. It was released on Atlantic Records on December 18, 2020. A studio version of "Find Me Here" appears as the twelfth track on Williams' second album, Flowers for Vases / Descansos.

=== Background ===
The EP was entirely a home recording on a 4-track recorder. Williams played alone on the EP, with Williams on vocals and acoustic guitar. Williams cites "Find Me Here" as one of her favorite songs she wrote in 2020.

=== Track listing ===
No.	Title	Writer(s)	Length
1.	"Simmer" (acoustic)	Hayley Williams; Joey Howard; Taylor York	5:35
2.	"Why We Ever" (acoustic)	Williams; Micah Tawlks	3:40
3.	"Find Me Here"	Williams	1:49
Total length:			11:04

=== Credits and personnel ===
Credits were adapted from liner notes.

Musicians

- Hayley Williams – primary artist, vocals, acoustic guitar

Additional personnel

- Daniel James – production, mixing, engineering
- Dave Cooley – mastering
