= Petals for Armor I =

EP by Hayley Williams
- Released: February 6, 2020
- Recorded: 2019
- Studio: East Iris Studios; Music Friends
- Length: 18:07
- Label: Atlantic
- Producer: Taylor York; Hayley Williams

Hayley Williams chronology
Petals for Armor I (2020)	Petals for Armor II (2020)

Singles from Petals for Armor
- 1. "Simmer" Released: January 22, 2020; 2. "Leave It Alone" Released: January 30, 2020

Petals for Armor I is the debut solo extended play (EP) by American singer-songwriter and Paramore frontwoman Hayley Williams. It was released on Atlantic Records on February 6, 2020, as the first in a planned series of releases in the Petals for Armor era. Williams explained the inspiration behind its title is due to her belief that "the best way for me to protect myself is to be vulnerable." The EP was produced by Williams' Paramore bandmate Taylor York and was written throughout 2019 during Paramore's hiatus after touring in support of their fifth studio album, After Laughter (2017).

The EP was supported by two singles; "Simmer" was released on January 22, 2020, and "Leave It Alone" on January 30. Each were accompanied with music videos which share a narrative.

== Background ==
Following extensive touring in support of Paramore's fifth studio album After Laughter (2017), Hayley Williams expressed her feelings about the group's future moving forward explaining that they were not breaking up, however needed time away from writing and touring. In an interview with BBC Radio, in January 2020, Williams explained her process behind developing Petals for Armor.

"I'm so ready and so incredibly humbled to get to share this project... Making it was a scary, empowering experience. Some of my proudest moments as a lyricist happened while writing 'PETALS FOR ARMOR.' And I was able to get my hands a little dirtier than usual when it came to instrumentation. I'm in a band with my favorite musicians so I never really feel the need to step into a role as a player when it comes to Paramore records. This project, however, benefited from a little bit of musical naïveté and rawness and so I experimented quite a bit more. I made this with some of the closest people to me. Their respective talents really shine bright throughout the record. I like to think we all make each other better and the result is something that sounds and FEELS exactly as I'd hoped it would. Now that it's time to put it all out there, I can finally exhale. I'm excited to let people in to experience a different side of myself that I've only very recently become familiar with."

In an Apple Music interview with Zane Lowe, Williams expressed that "Petals for Armor" was "a project", with Lowe confirming the first EP, which was released on February 6, 2020.

== Singles ==
"Simmer" was released as the album's lead single on January 22, 2020, on Atlantic Records. The single's music video, directed by Warren Fu, premiered on the same day. "Simmer" had been continually teased on social media throughout January 2020, featuring visual and audio clips of the track and its video.

"Leave It Alone" was released as the album's second single, along with its music video, on January 30, 2020.

== Track listing ==
No.	Title	Writer(s)	Length
1.	"Simmer"	Hayley Williams; Joey Howard; Taylor York	4:26
2.	"Leave It Alone"	Williams; Howard	4:05
3.	"Cinnamon"	Williams; York	3:31
4.	"Creepin'"	Howard; Steph Marziano	2:58
5.	"Sudden Desire"	Williams; Howard	3:07
Total length:			18:07

== Credits and personnel ==
Credits adapted from liner notes.

Musicians

- Hayley Williams – primary artist, lead vocals, keyboards, guitar
- Taylor York – production, additional instrumentation
- Joey Howard – bass guitar, keyboards, percussion
- Aaron Steele – drums, percussion, programming
- Benjamin Kaufman – violin, chin cello

Additional personnel

- Daniel James – string arrangements
- Carlos de la Garza – mixing engineer
- Dave Cooley – mastering engineer
- Kevin "K-Bo" Boettger – assistant engineer
- Michael Craver – assistant engineer, assistant mixing engineer
- David Fitzgibbons – assistant engineer, assistant mixing engineer
- Michelle Freetly – assistant engineer
- Jake Butler – assistant engineer

== Charts ==
Chart performance for Petals for Armor I
Chart (2020)	Peak position
US Top Current Albums (Billboard)	79
US Heatseekers Albums (Billboard)	19

== See also ==
- List of 2020 albums
