= Parachute (Hayley Williams song) =

2025 single by Hayley Williams

Single by Hayley Williams

from the album Ego Death at a Bachelorette Party
- Released: August 28, 2025
- Genre: Alternative rock; post-grunge
- Length: 3:40
- Label: Post Atlantic
- Songwriters: Hayley Williams; Daniel James; Steph Marziano
- Producers: Daniel James; Steph Marziano

Hayley Williams singles chronology
| "Glum" (2025) | "Parachute" (2025) |

Music video
- "Parachute" on YouTube

"Parachute" is a song by American singer-songwriter Hayley Williams from her third studio album, Ego Death at a Bachelorette Party (2025). It was released as the album's second single on August 28, 2025. The song was issued through Williams' own imprint Post Atlantic two years after her departure from Atlantic Records. It was the only previously-unheard song added for the album's official release, following Williams's surprise release of 17 standalone singles earlier in the summer. Musically, "Parachute" is an alternative rock and post-grunge song. Its lyrics address the aftermath of a failed relationship.

"Parachute" received critical acclaim from music critics, who praised Williams's raw vocal delivery and emotional songwriting. Critics also observed it as a highlight of Ego Death at a Bachelorette Party. The song earned a Grammy Award nomination for Best Alternative Music Performance at the 68th Annual Grammy Awards. Commercially, "Parachute" peaked at number 28 on Billboard's Hot Rock & Alternative Songs chart. The song's accompanying music video was directed by Zachary Gray.

== Background and release ==
Williams first previewed the material from Ego Death at a Bachelorette Party in July 2025 by uploading 17 unsequenced songs to her website as a surprise project called Ego. Those songs were later distributed individually to streaming platforms on August 1, 2025, marking her debut as an independent artist post-Atlantic. On August 28, 2025, Williams officially released the full album with an additional song, "Parachute", which had not been heard during the initial rollout. Upon its release, the song became the album's second single and an accompanying music video was published.

== Composition ==
Written by Williams, Daniel James, and Steph Marziano, and produced by the latter two, "Parachute" is an alternative rock and post-grunge song that channels heartbreak and disillusionment in its sound and lyrics. It opens with a moody, guitar-based arrangement before building into its climax with intense vocals by Williams. Lyrically, the song addresses the aftermath of a failed relationship: at one point Williams agonizes that "you were at my wedding / you could've told me not to do it", a line delivered as a strained shout in the second verse. Writing for Rolling Stone, Maya Georgi explains that Williams's voice "strains with hurt". The arrangement grows "cacophonous and raging with regret" as the song progresses, underscoring the bitterness and sorrow in the lyrics.

== Critical reception ==
"Parachute" garnered critical acclaim from music critics. Rolling Stone's Maya Georgi called the song "a summation of the heartbreak" that defines the album's narrative, commending its unflinching lyrical honesty and Williams's fierce vocal execution. Georgi wrote that it "packs its deepest blows" in Williams's anguished second verse and described the song as "cacophonous and raging with regret", noting how it captures Williams at her most emotionally brave as a solo artist. Writing for DIY, Sarah Jamieson praised "Parachute" for showing the complexity of grief, calling it a "thrashing gut-punch". Laura Molloy from NME praised the song for its transition from "pensive piano" to a "cathartic rock anthem".

=== Accolades ===
Awards and nominations for "Parachute"
| Organization | Year | Category | Result | Ref. |
|---|---|---|---|---|
| Grammy Awards | 2026 | Best Alternative Music Performance | Nominated | |

== Track listing ==
Digital download
| No. | Title | Length |
|---|---|---|
| 1. | "Parachute" | 3:40 |

== Personnel ==
- Hayley Williams – vocals, guitar
- Daniel James – additional vocals, guitar, keyboards, production, programming, engineering
- Steph Marziano – additional vocals, guitar, keyboards, production, programming
- Roger Alan Nichols – engineering
- Manny Marroquin – mixing
- Zach Pereyra – mastering
- Jesse Brady – engineering assistance
- Ramiro Fernandez-Seoane – mixing assistance
- Kolten Frenzl – additional vocals
- Elise Joseph – additional vocals
- Brian O'Connor – additional vocals

== Charts ==
=== Weekly charts ===
Weekly chart performance for "Parachute"
| Chart (2025–2026) | Peak position |
|---|---|
| Canada Modern Rock (Billboard Canada) | 37 |
| New Zealand Hot Singles (RMNZ) | 15 |
| US Hot Rock & Alternative Songs (Billboard) | 28 |
