= Simmer (song) =

Single by Hayley Williams

from the EP Petals for Armor I and the album Petals for Armor
- Released: January 22, 2020
- Recorded: Early 2019
- Genre: Indie pop; alternative rock
- Length: 4:26
- Label: Atlantic
- Songwriters: Hayley Williams; Taylor York; Joseph Howard
- Producer: Taylor York

Hayley Williams singles chronology
"Uncomfortably Numb" (2019)	"Simmer" (2020)	"Leave It Alone" (2020)

Music video
- "Simmer" on YouTube

"Simmer" is the debut solo single by American singer-songwriter and Paramore front-woman Hayley Williams. It was released for digital download and to streaming platforms on January 22, 2020 by Atlantic Records, as the lead single from Williams' debut album Petals for Armor. The song was written by Williams, Paramore touring musician Joseph Howard, and guitarist Taylor York.

== Background ==
In December 2019, Williams announced on her birthday that she would be releasing a "taste" of new solo music in January 2020. Williams revealed the song title on social media on January 20, 2020, after posting various teasers over the course of January which featured a "dark aesthetic", with one including a person running through the woods.

== Composition ==
"Simmer" has been labeled as indie pop, and alternative rock. The track runs at 110 BPM and four minutes and 26 seconds. It is in the key of A minor. The song was written by Hayley Williams, Taylor York, and Joseph Howard, with York also handling production.

=== Lyrics ===
Hayley Williams wrote "Simmer" about her personal experiences with specific types of abuse she has dealt with in her life. In an interview with Apple Music, Williams described how "Simmer" lyrically may not pertain to everyone and is specific about her personal experiences: "I can't promise this song will relate to everyone [...] It is about specific kinds of abuse and revenge, not everyone is going to want to associate with that. What I'm trying to do–for myself more than anyone else–is reframe my anger and try to learn from it. Instead of pretending it isn't there, ask it what it wants. The answer is almost never what you think it's going to be." She continued, "There is still a lot more to share [on Petals for Armor].

== Critical reception ==
Cat Zhang from Pitchfork said: "The first word of Williams' new debut solo single, 'Simmer', is an enunciated 'rage'. It hangs in the air like a provocation before she finishes: '... is a quiet thing'", also noticing the lack of "distorted, thrashing guitar[s]"; instead, saying it is accented by watery harp and ominous vocal harmonies. She also added: "Like a soundtrack song, 'Simmer' sets a mood and asks some hazy rhetorical questions—but too often, this story feels as though it could be passed off to anybody".

== Music video ==
The music video for "Simmer" was released on January 22, at the same time as the song. It was directed by Warren Fu.

The music video depicts Williams running naked through a forest at night, seemingly being chased by an unknown figure. She enters a house and discovers a room filled with candles and a bowl containing clay, which she covers her body with. When the figure eventually arrives at the room, Williams hits them with the bowl, knocking them unconscious. This results in the figure's mask coming off, revealing them to be Williams herself.

Vulture's Jordan Crucchiola considered the "Simmer" music video as a "mini horror movie", saying: "The whole thing is also pretty good set up for a cabin-in-the-woods horror movie".

== Track listing ==
No.	Title	Length
1.	"Simmer"	4:26

Remix
No.	Title	Length
1.	"Simmer" (Caroline Polachek Remix)	3:17

Acoustic
No.	Title	Length
1.	"Simmer" (Acoustic)	5:35

== Personnel ==
Credits adapted from Tidal liner notes.

- Hayley Williams – primary artist, vocals, keyboards, guitar
- Taylor York – producer, additional instrumentation
- Joey Howard – bass, keyboards
- Aaron Steele – drums, programming
- Carlos de la Garza – mixer, engineer
- Dave Cooley – mastering engineer
- Kevin "K-Bo" Boettger – assistant engineer
- Michael Craver – assistant engineer, assistant mixer
- David Fitzgibbons – assistant engineer, assistant mixer
- Michelle Freetly – assistant engineer
- Jake Butler – assistant engineer

== Charts ==
=== Weekly charts ===
Weekly chart performance for "Simmer"
Chart (2020–21)	Peak position
Scottish Singles Sales (Official Charts)	54
UK Singles Sales (OCC)	16
UK Singles Downloads (Official Charts)	47
UK Physical Singles (OCC)	1
US Hot Rock & Alternative Songs (Billboard)	7
US Rock & Alternative Airplay (Billboard)	30

=== Year-end charts ===
Year-end chart performance for "Simmer"
Chart (2021)	Position
UK Vinyl Singles (OCC)	33

== Release history ==
Country	Date	Format	Label	Ref.
United States	January 22, 2020	Digital download; streaming	Atlantic; RRP	
