= Ego Death at a Bachelorette Party =

2025 studio album by Hayley Williams

Studio album by Hayley Williams
- Released: August 28, 2025
- Genres: Alternative rock; alternative pop; indie rock; trip hop; folk
- Length: 66:44
- Label: Post Atlantic
- Producers: Daniel James; Jim-E Stack; Brian Robert Jones; Steph Marziano

Hayley Williams chronology
Flowers for Vases / Descansos (2021)	Ego Death at a Bachelorette Party (2025)

Singles from Ego Death at a Bachelorette Party
- 1. "Glum" Released: August 18, 2025; 2. "Parachute" Released: August 28, 2025

Ego Death at a Bachelorette Party is the third studio album by the American singer-songwriter Hayley Williams. She first uploaded 17 of the 20 songs to her official website on July 28, 2025, and later released them as standalone tracks onto streaming services on August 1. Williams self-released the album on August 28, under an independent imprint titled Post Atlantic, two years after her departure from Atlantic Records. Two additional songs were added to the album on October 24 and November 7. Williams co-wrote the songs, performed several instruments, and collaborated with the producer Daniel James, who was accompanied by Jim-E Stack and Brian Robert Jones on select tracks. The album received widespread critical acclaim upon its release.

== Release and marketing ==
On July 23, 2025, the Nashville public radio station WNXP promoted that a new song by Williams would be premiering on the station that night. The announcement was accompanied by a video of a person holding a CD which had the words "Mirtazapine" and "Glum" written with a marker. The former, referring to the antidepressant of the same name, was ultimately the song in question, premiering as scheduled without any detail regarding any official release. It was Williams's first solo release since her 2021 album Flowers for Vases / Descansos. Two days later, she performed the song live at the Newport Folk Festival with Bleachers during their set. On July 28, the singer uploaded 17 new songs—including the aforementioned—to her official website. The tracks could only be accessed after entering a 16-digit code that was sent to fans who purchased a product from Williams's hair dye company Good Dye Young. Music publications gave the untitled collection of songs the title Ego, the same name of the yellow dye product from Williams's brand. The website featured a similar style as 2000s Microsoft Windows desktop displays, including the unordered tracks in a MP3 file format above a yellow background with pictures of her dog. Around 24 hours after its publication, the collection was removed from the site, which disclosed the message, "Thank you for listening."

Williams surprise-released the 17 songs individually for streaming on August 1, 2025. It marked her first independent release following her departure from Atlantic Records in 2023—more than 20 years after the beginning of the contract as part of Paramore—and was published under an imprint listed as "Post Atlantic" and distributed via Secretly Distribution. A music video for the track "Ego Death at a Bachelorette Party", directed by Zachary Gray, premiered on August 5. The video was set in Nashville and features a cameo from the politician Justin Jones. In an interview with Billboard, Williams's manager Leah Hodgkiss said that the release marketing was motivated by their idea to "make music tangible" and "an experience" again. She elaborated on how people tend to "not even pay attention to what [they are] listening to" due to curated playlists on streaming platforms, such as Spotify and Apple Music. Williams wanted to refer to the songs as individual singles as she did not think of an album throughout the writing process. The track "Glum" also received a music video, which was co-directed by AJ Gibboney and the Paramore member Zac Farro, and premiered as a single on August 18. It was followed by acoustic versions, "Glum (in the Park)" and "Kill Me (in the Garden)". In an Instagram story, Williams said that the collection would be issued physically, although not meant to be considered an album. She also revealed that she was "listening to potential track-list orders and still trying to create [her] own", hinting at a future re-packaging.

Ego Death at a Bachelorette Party was officially released to streaming on August 28, 2025. It featured the 17 previously released songs alongside "Parachute", which premiered as a single on radio stations such as BBC Radio 1 on the same date. While announcing the release and tracklist on social media, Williams filled tracks 19 and 20 with blank spaces, hinting at two more songs to be added in the future. She stated that the final track order was inspired by a fan-made website that collected the preferred song order from fans' in the form of playlists. In an interview with Zane Lowe, the singer explained how she "really did want to shirk the responsibility" and was "interested in other people's perspectives," stating that she was not able to have one as she was "in the eye of [the] storm".

On October 24, a new track, entitled "Good Ol' Days", was added to the album, and subsequently performed by Williams with Bleachers at Rolling Stone's Musicians on Musicians event at New York City's Beacon Theatre, along with three other songs from the album. The album's final track, "Showbiz", was added on November 7, coinciding with the album's physical release. In-person listening party events, dubbed "Ego Nites," were also held in various record stores worldwide in celebration of said physical release.

== Tour ==
In December 2024, four years after the cancellation of her supposed first solo tour, the Petals for Armor Tour, due to the COVID-19 pandemic, Williams first announced her renewed intent to play solo shows in 2025.

On November 7, 2025, an image listing United States, Europe, and United Kingdom dates for a tour in support of the album was quietly added to Williams' website. Three days later, the tour, entitled Hayley Williams at a Bachelorette Party, was formally announced, with supporting acts Water from Your Eyes, Snuggle, and Tiberius b. More shows were added on November 12 due to "overwhelming demand."

In an attempt to make ticket distribution more accessible and affordable, Williams partnered with the platform Openstage to host verified presale registration, hoping to combat bots and scalpers from purchasing tickets for tour dates.

== Composition ==
Ego Death at a Bachelorette Party is an alternative rock, alternative pop, indie rock, trip hop, pop, folk album, which features elements of synth-pop, and shoegaze. Williams performed several instruments for the album and co-wrote the songs in collaboration with the record producer Daniel James, and also received contributions from Brian Robert Jones and Jim-E Stack, among others.

== Critical reception ==
Professional ratings
Aggregate scores
Source	Rating
AnyDecentMusic?	9.0/10
Metacritic	91/100
Review scores
Source	Rating
AllMusic	4.5/5 stars
Clash	8/10
Drowned in Sound	10/10
Exclaim!	9/10
Kerrang!	5/5
NME	5/5 stars
Paste	9.2/10
Pitchfork	7.3/10
Rolling Stone	4.5/5 stars
Sputnikmusic	4.7/5

Ego Death at a Bachelorette Party was met with widespread acclaim from music critics upon its release. At Metacritic, which assigns a normalized rating out of 100 to reviews from mainstream critics, the album has an average score of 91 based on eleven reviews, indicating "universal acclaim". Rolling Stone listed the album at number 9 on their list, "The 100 Best Albums of 2025".

=== Rankings ===
Year-end rankings for Ego Death at a Bachelorette Party
Publication	Accolade	Rank	Ref.
Consequence	The 50 Best Albums of 2025	36	
Exclaim!	Exclaim!'s 50 Best Albums of 2025	7	
The Line of Best Fit	The Best Albums of 2025 Ranked	6	
The New Yorker	The Best Albums of 2025 (Amanda Petrusich's List)	6	
Paste	The 50 Best Albums of 2025	20	
Rolling Stone	The 100 Best Albums of 2025	9	
Stereogum	The 50 Best Albums of 2025	32	
Kerrang!	The 50 Best Albums of 2025	4	
The Bitter Southerner	Best Southern Albums of 2025	1	
The Forty Five	The 45 best albums of 2025	13	
Billboard	The 50 Best Albums of 2025: Staff Picks	36	
Notion	Notion's 25 Best Albums of 2025	–	
Associated Press	AP's top albums of 2025	–	
WXPN	Nashville albums of 2025	1	
Staged Haze	The 50 Best Albums of 2025	2	
Flood Magazine	The Best Albums of 2025	6	
NME	The 50 best albums of 2025	9	
The Independent	The 20 best albums of 2025	Honorary mention	
Clash	Albums of the Year 2025	4	

== Track listing ==
All tracks are written by Hayley Williams and Daniel James, except where noted.

No.	Title	Writer(s)	Length
1.	"Ice in My OJ"	Hayley Williams; Daniel James; Matt Bronleewe; Jeremy Bose; Tasia Tjornhom; Tedd Tjornhom	2:11
2.	"Glum"		3:11
3.	"Kill Me"		2:47
4.	"Whim"		3:35
5.	"Mirtazapine"		3:21
6.	"Disappearing Man"		3:29
7.	"Love Me Different"	Williams; James; Christian Mazzalai; Deck D'Arcy; Laurent Brancowitz; Thomas Mars	3:32
8.	"Brotherly Hate"		2:49
9.	"Negative Self Talk"		4:13
10.	"Ego Death at a Bachelorette Party"		3:19
11.	"Hard"		2:56
12.	"Discovery Channel"	Williams; James; Jonathan Hensleigh; Greg Taylor; Jim Strain; Chris Van Allsburg; James M. Franks	3:17
13.	"True Believer"	Williams; James; Jim-E Stack; Eli Teplin	3:49
14.	"Zissou"		2:55
15.	"Dream Girl in Shibuya"		4:22
16.	"Blood Bros"		2:47
17.	"I Won't Quit on You"		3:19
18.	"Parachute"	Williams; James; Steph Marziano	3:40
19.	"Good Ol' Days"		3:23
20.	"Showbiz"		3:50
Total length:			66:44

=== Notes ===
- "Ice in My OJ" interpolates "Jumping Inside" by Mammoth City Messengers, written by Jeremy Bose, Matt Bronleewe, Tasia Tjornhom, and Tedd Tjornhom.
- "Love Me Different" contains samples of "Fior di Latte" by Phoenix, written by Christian Mazzalai, Deck D'Arcy, Laurent Brancowitz, and Thomas Mars.
- "Discovery Channel" interpolates "The Bad Touch" by Bloodhound Gang, written by James M. Franks.
- "Good Ol' Days" and "Showbiz" were not included on the original August 28, 2025 release, but added to later digital releases. "Good Ol' Days" was added October 29, 2025. "Showbiz" was added November 7, 2025. Both tracks appear on all physical releases of the album after the initial 1,500 sold on Williams's webstore. The original release is 59:31 in total length. The second release is 62:54. The third release is 66:44.

== Personnel ==
Credits are adapted from the album's liner notes.

Musicians

- Hayley Williams – vocals, guitar (all tracks except "Disappearing Man", "Love Me Different", "Brotherly Hate", "Negative Self Talk", "Discovery Channel", "Zissou", "Good Ol' Days", "Showbiz"), drums ("Ice in My OJ", "Glum", "Mirtazapine"), keyboards ("Ice in My OJ", "Ego Death at a Bachelorette Party", "Hard"), bass ("Glum", "Mirtazapine", "Hard")
- Kolten Frenzl – vocals ("Parachute")
- Joey Howard – bass ("Mirtazapine", "Disappearing Man", "Negative Self Talk", "Ego Death at a Bachelorette Party", "True Believer", "Dream Girl in Shibuya", "Good Ol' Days")
- Daniel James – keyboards, programming, guitar (all tracks except "Blood Bros") bass ("Ice in My OJ", "Kill Me", "Whim", "Negative Self Talk", "Discovery Channel", "Zissou", "Dream Girl in Shibuya", "I Won't Quit on You"), vocals ("Parachute")
- Brian Robert Jones – bass ("Love Me Different"), guitar ("Kill Me", "Love Me Different", "Brotherly Hate", "Good Ol' Days"), mandolin ("Love Me Different", "Good Ol' Days"), programming ("Love Me Different")
- Elise Joseph – vocals ("Ice in My OJ", "Kill Me", "Parachute")
- Viola Joseph – vocals ("Kill Me")
- Ben Kaufman – strings ("Mirtazapine", "Negative Self Talk", "True Believer")
- Steph Marziano – programming ("Parachute"), keyboards ("Parachute"), guitar ("Parachute"), vocals ("Parachute")
- Roger Alan Nichols – guitar ("Whim", "Mirtazapine", "Dream Girl in Shibuya")
- Brian O'Connor – vocals ("Parachute")
- James Harmon "Jim-E" Stack – keyboards ("True Believer"), programming ("True Believer")
- Katrina Urton – vocals ("I Won't Quit on You")
- Rusty Williams – vocals ("Good Ol' Days")

Technical

- Engineering by Jesse Brady, Daniel James, and Roger Alan Nichols
- Mixing by Manny Marroquin (all tracks), Ramiro Fernandez-Seoane ("Parachute", "Good Ol' Days")
- Produced by Daniel James (all tracks), Brian Robert Jones ("Love Me Different", "Brotherly Hate", "Good Ol' Days"), Steph Marziano ("Parachute"), "Jim-E" Stack ("True Believer")
- Mastering by Zach Pereyra

== Charts ==
Chart performance
Chart (2025)	Peak position
Australian Albums (ARIA)	17
Belgian Albums (Ultratop Flanders)	146
French Physical Albums (SNEP)	70
French Rock & Metal Albums (SNEP)	19
German Albums (Offizielle Top 100)	62
German Rock & Metal Albums (Offizielle Top 100)	18
Irish Albums (Official Charts)	28
Irish Independent Albums (IRMA)	4
New Zealand Albums (RMNZ)	12
Portuguese Albums (AFP)	14
Scottish Albums (Official Charts)	1
Swedish Physical Albums (Sverigetopplistan)	11
UK Albums (Official Charts)	10
UK Independent Albums (Official Charts)	1
US Billboard 200	12
US Independent Albums (Billboard)	1
US Top Rock & Alternative Albums (Billboard)	2
