= Hayley Williams =

American singer (born 1988)

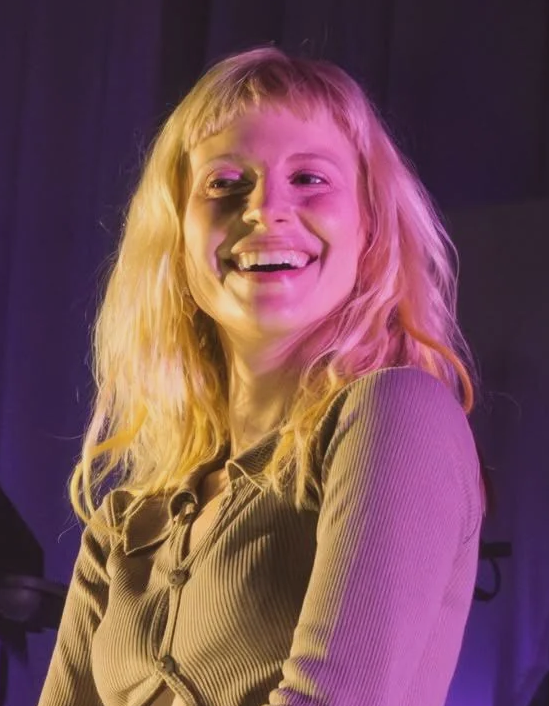
- Williams in 2026

Background information
- Born: Hayley Nichole Williams; December 27, 1988 (age 37); Meridian, Mississippi, U.S.
- Origin: Franklin, Tennessee, U.S.
- Genres: Pop-punk; emo; pop rock; alternative rock; power pop; art pop; new wave; synth-pop
- Occupations: Singer; songwriter; musician
- Instruments: Vocals; keyboards; guitar; drums
- Years active: 2003–present
- Labels: Fueled by Ramen; Atlantic; Post Atlantic
- Member of: Paramore; Power Snatch
- Spouse: Chad Gilbert (m. 2016; div. 2017)
- Website: hayleywilliams.net

Hayley Nichole Williams (born December 27, 1988) is an American singer and songwriter. She is the lead vocalist and a founding member of the rock band Paramore and has released several solo albums. In 2023, Billboard ranked her as the 13th greatest rock lead singer of all time; that same year, Alternative Press readers voted her as the second greatest pop-punk vocalist of all time.

Born and raised in Meridian, Mississippi, Williams and her mother moved to Franklin, Tennessee, following her parents' divorce, there forming Paramore with Josh Farro, Zac Farro, and Jeremy Davis. Since, the band has released six studio albums: All We Know Is Falling (2005), Riot! (2007), Brand New Eyes (2009), Paramore (2013), After Laughter (2017), and This Is Why (2023). The group has continuously changed its lineup (currently consisting of Williams, Zac Farro, and Taylor York), with Williams being the only member to appear on all six albums. Along with York, Williams won the 2015 Grammy Award for Best Rock Song for Paramore's song "Ain't It Fun".

Williams' work outside Paramore includes the song "Teenagers" for the soundtrack of the film Jennifer's Body (2009) and collaborations with New Found Glory, Zedd, American Football, Moses Sumney, Turnstile, and David Byrne. In 2010, she was featured on the single "Airplanes" by B.o.B, which peaked at No. 2 on the U.S. Billboard Hot 100. The song's sequel, "Airplanes, Part II", still featuring Williams and adding a guest verse by Eminem, gained a nomination for the Grammy Award for Best Pop Collaboration with Vocals. In 2023, she featured on "Castles Crumbling", a song on Taylor Swift's re-recorded album Speak Now (Taylor's Version).

As a solo artist, Williams released the extended plays Petals for Armor I and Petals for Armor II (both 2020), the subsequent full-length album Petals for Armor (2020), and her second album Flowers for Vases / Descansos (2021). In 2025, she released her third album Ego Death at a Bachelorette Party under her own independent label named Post Atlantic; the album earned her three Grammy Award nominations. In 2026, she began the musical project Power Snatch with producer Daniel James. Her other ventures include the online series Kiss-Off (2015) and the hair dye company Good Dye Young.

== Early life ==
Hayley Nichole Williams was born on December 27, 1988, in Meridian, Mississippi, the daughter of Cristi and Joey Williams. She has two younger half-sisters. Her childhood neighbor was NBA player Rodney Hood. After her parents' divorce in 2002, when she was 13, she moved with her mother to Franklin, Tennessee. At her new school, she met future Paramore bandmates Josh and Zac Farro. Shortly after settling in Franklin, she began taking lessons with vocal coach Brett Manning. While still at school, Williams tried out for a local funk cover band called The Factory, where she met future Paramore bandmate Jeremy Davis.

== Music career ==
=== 2004–present: Paramore ===
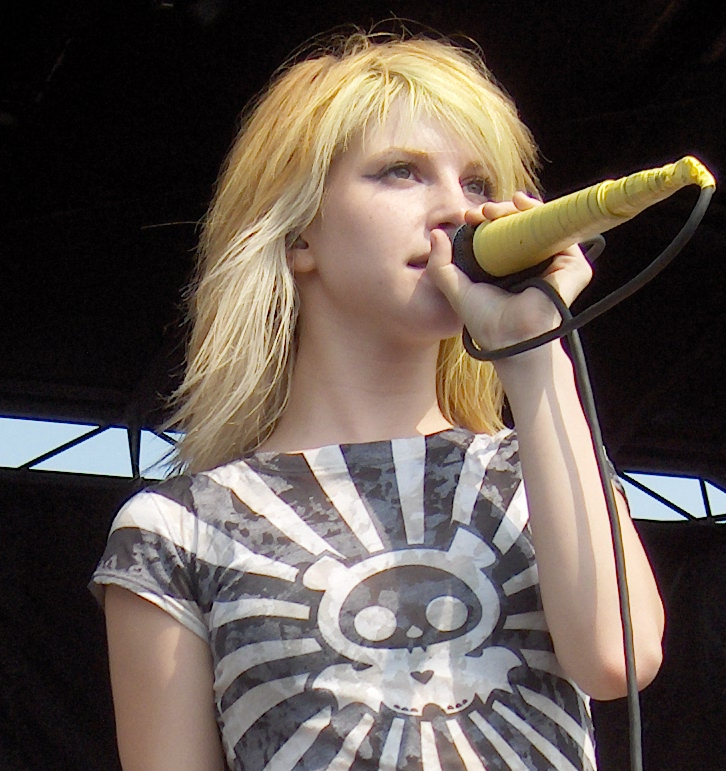
Williams performing on the Warped Tour in Camden, New Jersey, in August 2007

Williams was discovered in 2003 by managers Dave Steunebrink and Richard Williams, who signed the 14-year-old to a two-year production deal. At the time she was writing pop songs with songwriters in Nashville. Williams was introduced to Atlantic Records A&R Tom Storms through Richard Williams' attorneys Jim Zumwalt and Kent Marcus, and then signed to the label by Jason Flom. The label's original plan for their new artist was to make her a solo pop artist, but Williams objected to this, saying that she wanted to be part of a band and play pop punk music.

Atlantic decided to go along with her wishes, and she then formed Paramore with Josh Farro, Zac Farro, and Jeremy Davis. The music of Paramore was originally supposed to come out on Atlantic Records, but the label's marketing department decided it would be better for the image of the band to not have them attached to a huge label. They instead released their music through a "cooler" niche label, Fueled by Ramen. According to Williams, the name "Paramore" came from the maiden name of the mother of one of their first bass players. Once the group learned the meaning of the homophone "paramour" ("secret lover"), they decided to adopt the name, using the Paramore spelling. The band's debut album, All We Know Is Falling, was released in 2005 when Hayley was only 16 years old. Paramore has since released five more studio albums, Riot! (2007), Brand New Eyes (2009), the self-titled Paramore (2013), After Laughter (2017) and This Is Why (2023). In June 2009, the band welcomed Taylor York (rhythm guitar) as an official member, although he had already been playing as a touring member with the band since 2007. In December 2010, Josh and Zac Farro left the band. The news was posted by Williams on Paramore's website, with Josh later posting a blog post confirming their departure, calling the group "a manufactured product of a major label, riding on the coattails of 'Hayley's dream'".

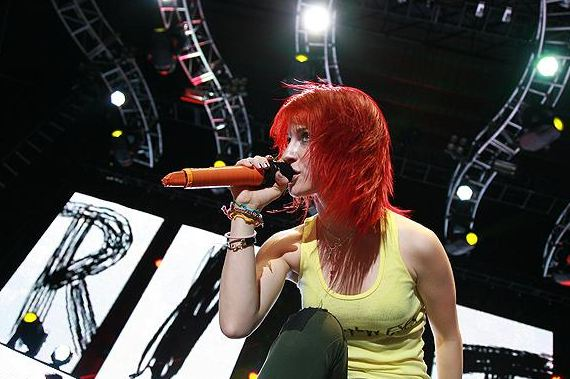
Williams performing on the Honda Civic Tour in July 2010

In 2006, Paramore toured outside of the United States for the first time, which included a headline tour of the UK and supporting post-hardcore rock band The Blackout on the Give It A Name Festival in Europe. The following year, the group made an appearance in the music video for "Kiss Me" by New Found Glory. In the 2007 Kerrang! Readers' Poll, she finished second to Evanescence's Amy Lee in the "Sexiest Female" category, going on to win the first place spot for "Sexiest Female" a year later in the 2008 poll, and again in the 2009, 2010, 2011 and 2012 poll. She also appears as a playable character in the video game Guitar Hero World Tour after completing "Misery Business" in the vocalist campaign.

Williams was honored with the "Trailblazer Award" in the 2014 Billboard's Women in Music Awards for making a unique mark in music and paving the way for other artists. In 2015, Williams starred as the 'Crimson Curse' in Taylor Swift's music video for her single, "Bad Blood", alongside sixteen other celebrities. Along with band member and co-writer Taylor York, Williams was nominated for and won the Grammy Award for Best Rock Song at the 2015 ceremony for the song "Ain't It Fun". In July 2015, Williams won the APMA for Best Vocalist.

In a 2019 interview with l'Odet, Williams was asked if she would "stay in Paramore for a long time" and answered, "In moving forward, if the three of us are happy, then we will just do whatever we want to do. If that means collaborating with each other, bringing other friends in to collaborate—there are seven band members when we tour. We're all friends and we all make music in different parts, together. So I feel like, yes, I want to be in Paramore... I've been in a band with them since I was 12. I don't think the band is going anywhere. As long as we're friends, the band just is. It's just in us."

=== 2009–2019: Early collaborations ===
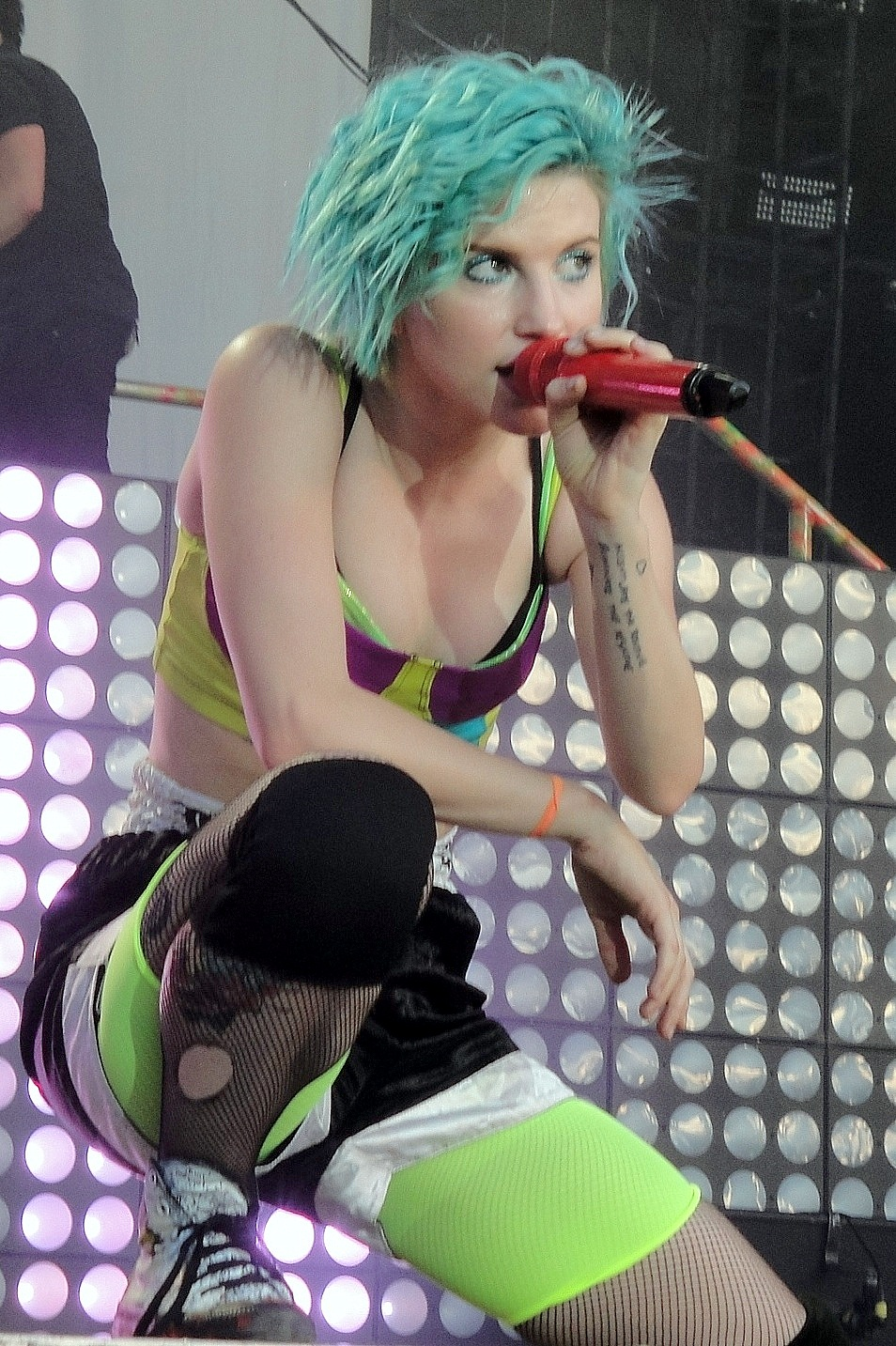
Williams performing Oklahoma City, in August 2014

Williams wrote and recorded the song "Teenagers", which was featured in the soundtrack for the feature film Jennifer's Body. After the release of "Teenagers", Williams stated that she had no plans to establish herself as a solo artist. In 2010, she appeared on the tracks "Airplanes" and "Airplanes, Part II" from alternative rapper B.o.B's debut album, B.o.B Presents: The Adventures of Bobby Ray. When it was released as a single, "Airplanes" peaked within the top ten in nineteen countries, including the number one position in the United Kingdom and New Zealand.

Williams collaborated with Weezer on a version of the Muppets song "Rainbow Connection" for the 2011 cover album Muppets: The Green Album. She featured on EDM producer Zedd's track "Stay the Night", which appeared on his debut studio album Clarity (2013). In 2015, she featured on a new version of the song "Vicious Love" for her then-fiancée Chad Gilbert's band New Found Glory, also appearing in its music video. In 2016, she featured on a remix of Chvrches' song "Bury It", after having performed it live with the band the previous year. In 2019, she collaborated with American Football on the song "Uncomfortably Numb", which appeared on the band's third self-titled studio album.

=== 2020–2021: Petals for Armor and Flowers for Vases ===
In December 2019, on her 31st birthday, Williams announced that she would release solo music the following year, revealing the title of the project, Petals for Armor, on January 7, 2020. On January 22, she released the album's lead single, "Simmer", with an accompanying music video. Following the release of "Leave It Alone" that month, on February 6, she released Petals for Armor I, an extended play including the two singles and three additional songs. In March, she delayed the intended release of the second EP due to the COVID-19 pandemic, instead releasing the song "Roses/Lotus/Violet/Iris" featuring the members of Boygenius; Petals for Armor II released on April 21 with the single "Dead Horse". The album released on May 8, 2026. The album's associated solo tour, the Petals for Armor Tour, was postponed from May 2020 and subsequently canceled due to the pandemic.

In January 2021, Williams started teasing a project titled Flowers for Vases / Descansos. She unofficially released the single "My Limb" by giving a CD with the track on it to a fan. Williams released the album on February 5, 2021.

=== 2023–present: Further collaborations and Ego Death at a Bachelorette Party ===
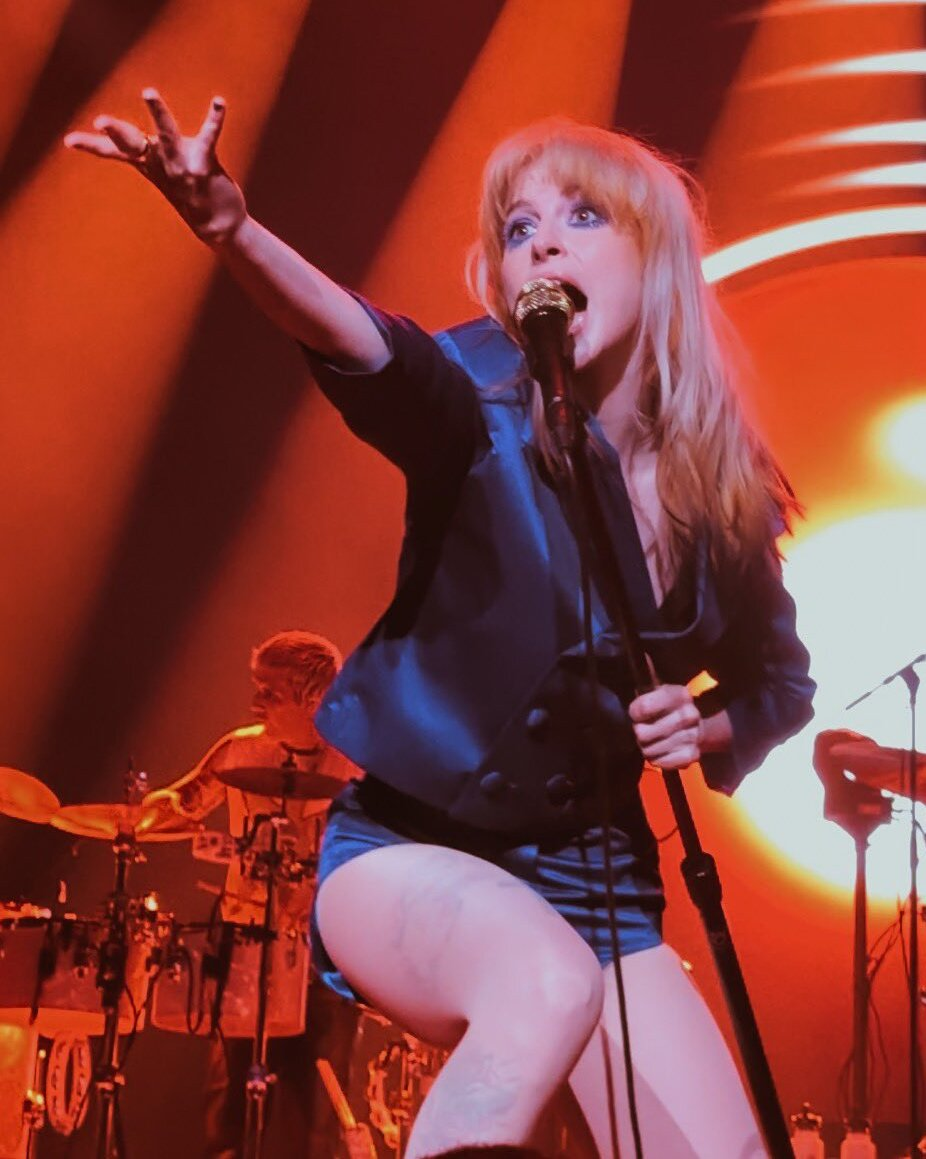
Williams performing on the This Is Why Tour in 2023

In July 2023, Williams featured on the song "Castles Crumbling" from Taylor Swift's album Speak Now (Taylor's Version); at a London date on Swift's Eras Tour in June 2024, the two performed the song live. She and Blood Orange provided vocals on Turnstile's track "Seein' Stars", which released in April 2025 ahead of their album Never Enough; the following month, she joined the band during a Brooklyn concert to perform the song live. Williams collaborated with Moses Sumney on "I Like It I Like It", which released on May 8, 2025. Also that year, she featured on David Byrne's album Who Is the Sky? and Jay Som's album Belong, released in September and October, respectively. Also in October, she and Byrne collaborated on the song "Open the Door" for Netflix's animated film The Twits. In 2026, she featured on Failure's album Location Lost, the Linda Lindas' album Gotta Get Out, and the Turnstile remix album Never Enough: Versions.

On February 5, 2025, Williams performed at Give a Fuck LA, a benefit concert for those affected by the Southern California wildfires which occurred earlier that year. That same month, she helped her grandfather Rusty Williams release his long-unreleased debut album Grand Man on her bandmate Zac Farro's label Congrats Records; she stated that his songs were an early inspiration for her own musical ambitions. Included on that release was Williams' cover of her grandfather's song "Friends or Lovers", which she had previously sampled on Petals for Armor. The next month, she joined Deftones onstage during a Nashville encore to sing "Minerva"; she previously performed "Passenger" live with the band in 2010.

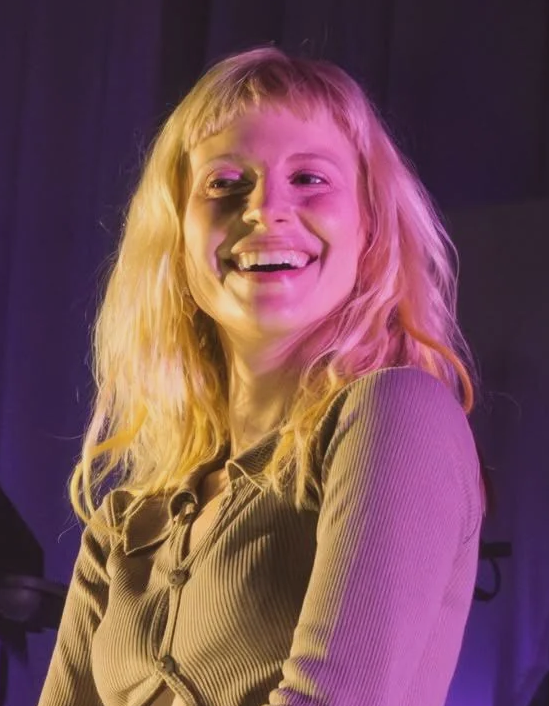
Williams performing on her first solo tour in 2026

On July 23, 2025, Williams shared the single "Mirtazapine" exclusively on Nashville radio station WNXP, two days later performing the song at the Newport Folk Festival with Bleachers. On July 28, she made the song and 16 additional new tracks available to stream on her website. Access was restricted, requiring a passcode distributed through her hair product company, Good Dye Young. On August 1, Williams released all 17 songs on streaming services as stand-alone singles via her own label, Post Atlantic, with their digital distribution being handled by Secretly Distribution. The album was released as Ego Death at a Bachelorette Party on August 28, containing an additional eighteenth song.

In December 2024, on her 36th birthday, Williams announced plans to play her first solo concerts in 2025, after the cancellation of the Petals for Armor Tour in 2020. On November 10, 2025, she officially announced a tour in support of Ego Death, entitled Hayley Williams at a Bachelorette Party, and set it for the following year. While touring in the United States, she announced another tour, "The Hayley Williams Show", to take place in 2026 and 2027 featuring songs from all of her past work. She will perform as a headliner at the music festivals Clockenflap 2026 and Primavera Sound 2027, in December 2026 and June 2027 respectively.

=== 2026: Power Snatch ===
On January 30, 2026, Williams and Ego Death at a Bachelorette Party producer Daniel James appeared on Apple Music 1 to launch their band Power Snatch, also premiering their debut track "Assignment". The pair had quietly published another song entitled "DMs" on their Bandcamp page the month prior. On February 2, they officially released "Assignment" onto streaming platforms alongside a three-song extended play entitled EP1. On March 9, they put out a cover of the song "Perfect Hand" from This is Lorelei's album Box for Buddy, Box for Star ahead of its super deluxe release the following month. In a press statement, James credited the cover with the formation of the band. On June 26, they released two singles, entitled "Great" and "Training", both featuring Tiberius b. On September 29, they released a cover of Mark William Lewis's song "Spit".

== Business ventures ==
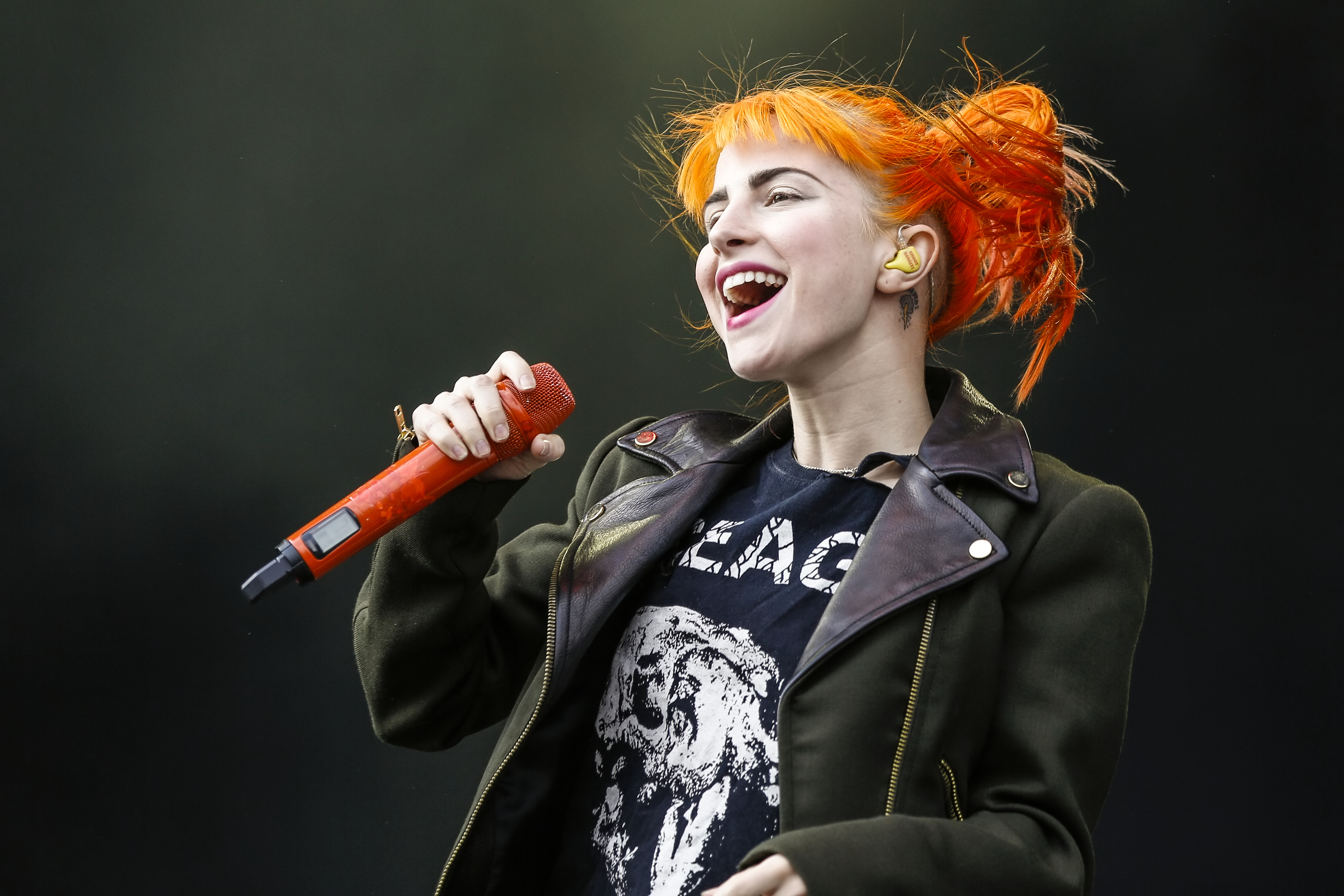
Williams performing at Rock im Park in Nuremberg, Germany, in 2013

In March 2013, Williams announced she was partnering with MAC Cosmetics for the release of a new makeup collection on April 9, 2013. The four-piece collection included a bright orange lipstick, an orange nail polish, a shimmery coral eye shadow and a beauty powder. Williams appeared on the April 2013 cover of Nylon magazine to promote Paramore's self-titled album. In October, she partnered with the Hard Rock Café's PINKTOBER charity campaign to raise awareness and funding for breast cancer and its research.

In 2015, she launched the online beauty and music series Kiss-Off on Popular TV.

In November 2020, Williams released a candle in collaboration with home fragrance brand Apothekeco.

In March 2021, Williams announced her collaboration with Tea Huntress, a tea manufacturer in Nashville. Two new blends were available as part of the collaboration, called Bloom and Alibi. A portion of each sale was donated to Thistle Farms, an organisation that helps women survivors of trafficking, abuse, and addiction.

In September 2026, Williams made a guest appearance as herself on episode 2 of the Netflix series 'DANG!'. The Paramore song "Ain't it Fun" also plays in the episode.

=== 2016–present: Good Dye Young ===
In 2016, after over four years of planning, Williams launched the hair dye company Good Dye Young alongside her hair and makeup artist Brian O'Connor. The dyes are vegan and cruelty-free. In 2017, Good Dye Young launched a temporary hair dye line that disappears after one wash called Poser Paste, and in May 2020, they released Lighter Daze, a range of five semi-permanent pastel colors.

== Artistry ==
=== Musical style and influences ===
Throughout her career, her musical style has been described as pop-punk, emo, pop rock, alternative rock, power pop, art pop, new wave, synth-pop, and indie pop. Williams cites a wide range of musical acts as her influences including Debbie Harry, the Shangri-Las, Siouxsie Sioux, Gwen Stefani, Beyoncé, and Brody Dalle of the Distillers.

=== Voice ===
Williams is a soprano with a four-octave range. Emilee Lindner of MTV News has noted her ability to sing in the whistle register, and Maura Johnston of Rolling Stone her "acrobatic" singing style. Alternative Press wrote in 2007 that Williams "has more charisma than singers twice her age, and her band aren't far behind in their chops, either." Singer-songwriter John Mayer praised Williams's voice in an October 2007 blog post, calling her "The great orange hope" (her hair being orange at the time).

== Personal life ==
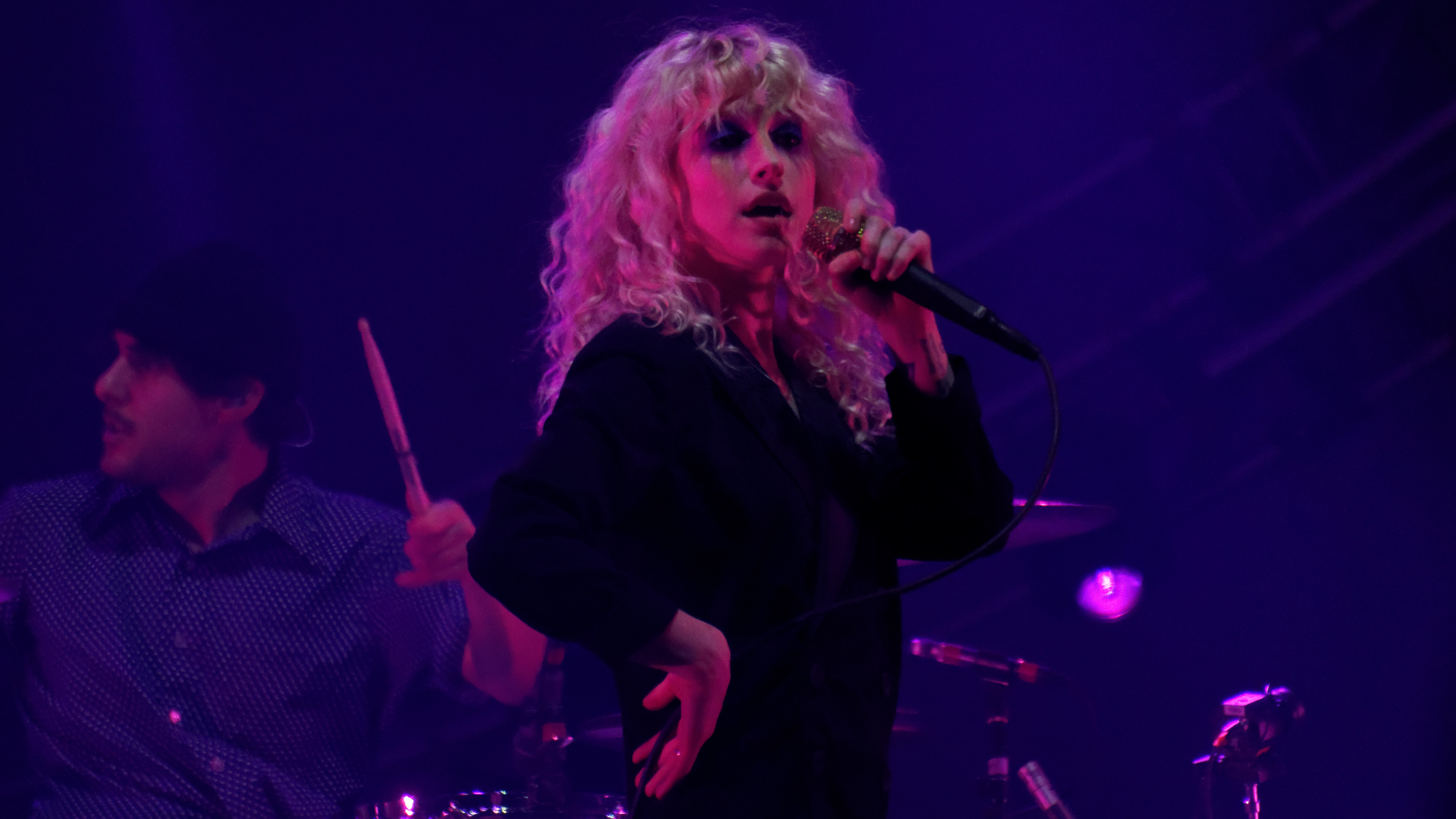
Williams performing at The O2, in London, in January 2018

In the past, Williams has identified as Christian and regularly discussed her faith in relation to her music, but has often criticized the judgmental nature of some Christians. In a Substack post in 2026, Williams stated that her beliefs have "not been connected to any religion nor particular figure" for a long time. The Farro brothers cited differing attitudes to faith as contributing to their exit from Paramore, with Josh Farro citing the lyrics of some songs in Brand New Eyes in particular, saying that they "contradict [their] faith".

In late 2007, Williams began dating New Found Glory lead guitarist Chad Gilbert, even though he was already married to Sherri DuPree, the lead singer of the rock band Eisley. Williams and Gilbert became engaged on Christmas Day in 2014, and were married on February 20, 2016. They announced that they had separated on July 1, 2017, with Gilbert's infidelity later being revealed as the reason, and their divorce was finalized by the end of the year.

In September 2022, Williams confirmed she was in a relationship with her Paramore bandmate Taylor York.

Williams previously publicized her decisions not to smoke, drink alcohol, or use recreational drugs, though she now drinks alcohol. She has been vocal about her experiences with depression, which caused her to briefly leave Paramore in mid-2015. In a 2020 interview, she revealed she had suicidal thoughts but did not act on them. In a 2021 interview, she discussed how she had been impacted by generational trauma and revealed that she has been seeing a therapist since 2018. In a 2023 interview, she revealed that she had been diagnosed with PTSD in 2018.

In 2015, Williams responded to feminist criticism of Paramore's breakout song "Misery Business", citing her youth and inexperience as a contributing factor to the song's allegedly misogynistic lyrics. In a blog post, she described herself as "a proud feminist [...] just maybe not a perfect one".

In 2021, Williams announced that she would be abandoning her personal social media accounts due to her need for boundaries between her public and private life and her desire to "spend more time looking up and out, rather than down". She directed her fans to instead follow Paramore's official accounts, which remain highly active.

=== Political views ===
In 2020, following the George Floyd protests, Williams temporarily handed control of her Instagram account to Nashville-based activist group Teens4Equality to highlight their work in relation to the Black Lives Matter movement.

In 2022, Williams endorsed Democratic nominee Beto O'Rourke in the Texas gubernatorial election. During a 2023 concert, Williams criticized supporters of Florida governor Ron DeSantis near the start of his presidential bid saying, "If you vote for Ron DeSantis, you're fucking dead to me."

At the 2024 iHeartRadio Music Festival, during the lead-up to that year's US presidential election, Williams made a statement slamming candidate Donald Trump and Project 2025, urging listeners to vote against the "Trump agenda," which she described as a dictatorship.

Williams joined the No Music for Genocide campaign in September 2025, geo-blocking her and Paramore's music in Israel.

In November 2025, Williams said that "people who think that trans people are a burden" were not welcome at her shows.

In October 2026, following a concert at which she shouted "fuck ICE" and "free Palestine" at a concert, the Department of Homeland Security suggested she "thank them [ICE] for their service, not belittle their sacrifice", to which Williams responded via her Instagram story, "And may I suggest all Nazi bitches suck on my fat dick." She criticized Chilean president José Antonio Kast during a November 2026 concert.

== Discography ==
- Petals for Armor (2020)
- Flowers for Vases / Descansos (2021)
- Ego Death at a Bachelorette Party (2025)

== Filmography ==
=== Television ===
| Year | Title | Role | Notes |
|---|---|---|---|
| 2026 | Dang! | Self | Episode 2, voice |

=== Podcast host ===
Podcasts hosted by Hayley Williams
| Year | Title | Role |
|---|---|---|
| 2022 | Everything Is Emo | Host |

== Concert tours ==
- Hayley Williams at a Bachelorette Party (2026)
- "The Hayley Williams Show" (2026–2027)

== Awards and nominations ==
Accolades for Hayley Williams
| Association | Year | Category | Work | Result | Ref. |
|---|---|---|---|---|---|
| Alternative Press Music Awards | 2014 | Best Singer | Herself | Nominated | |
| Alternative Press Music Awards | 2015 | Best Vocalist | Herself | Won | |
| BET Awards | 2011 | Video of the Year | "Airplanes" (with B.o.B) | Nominated | |
| BET Awards | 2011 | Best Collaboration | "Airplanes" (with B.o.B) | Nominated | |
| Billboard Women in Music | 2014 | Trailblazer Award | Herself | Won | |
| Grammy Awards | 2008 | Best New Artist | Herself (with Paramore) | Nominated | |
| Grammy Awards | 2010 | Best Song Written for a Motion Picture, Television or Other Visual Media | "Decode" (with Paramore) | Nominated | |
| Grammy Awards | 2011 | Best Pop Collaboration with Vocals | "Airplanes, Part II" (with B.o.B and Eminem) | Nominated | |
| Grammy Awards | 2011 | Best Pop Performance by a Duo or Group with Vocals | "The Only Exception" (with Paramore) | Nominated | |
| Grammy Awards | 2015 | Best Rock Song | "Ain't It Fun" (with Paramore) | Won | |
| Grammy Awards | 2024 | Best Rock Album | This Is Why (with Paramore) | Won | |
| Grammy Awards | 2024 | Best Alternative Music Performance | "This Is Why" (with Paramore) | Won | |
| Grammy Awards | 2026 | Best Alternative Music Album | Ego Death at a Bachelorette Party | Nominated | |
| Grammy Awards | 2026 | Best Alternative Music Performance | "Parachute" | Nominated | |
| Grammy Awards | 2026 | Best Rock Performance | "Mirtazapine" | Nominated | |
| Grammy Awards | 2026 | Best Rock Song | "Glum" | Nominated | |
| Grammy Awards | 2027 | Best Alternative Music Performance | "Showbiz" | Pending | |
| iHeartRadio Music Awards | 2014 | EDM Song of the Year | "Stay the Night" (with Zedd) | Nominated | |
| Kerrang Readers' Poll | 2007 | Sexiest Female | Herself | Nominated | |
| Kerrang Readers' Poll | 2008 | Sexiest Female | Herself | Won | |
| Kerrang Readers' Poll | 2009 | Sexiest Female | Herself | Won | |
| Kerrang Readers' Poll | 2010 | Sexiest Female | Herself | Won | |
| Kerrang Readers' Poll | 2011 | Sexiest Female | Herself | Won | |
| Kerrang Readers' Poll | 2012 | Sexiest Female | Herself | Won | |
| Kerrang Readers' Poll | 2012 | Hottest Female | Herself | Nominated | |
| Kerrang Readers' Poll | 2012 | Tweeter of the Year | Herself | Won | |
| Kerrang Readers' Poll | 2013 | Hottest Female | Herself | Nominated | |
| Kerrang Readers' Poll | 2015 | Best Tweeter | Herself | Won | |
| Los Premios MTV Latinoamérica | 2008 | Premio Fashionista | Herself | Won | |
| Los Premios MTV Latinoamérica | 2009 | Premio Fashionista | Herself | Won | |
| MTV Europe Music Awards | 2020 | Best Alternative | Herself | Won | |
| MTV Video Music Awards | 2010 | Video of the Year | "Airplanes" (with B.o.B) | Nominated | |
| MTV Video Music Awards | 2010 | Best Hip-Hop Video | "Airplanes" (with B.o.B) | Nominated | |
| MTV Video Music Awards | 2010 | Best Collaboration | "Airplanes" (with B.o.B) | Nominated | |
| MTV Video Music Awards | 2014 | Best Editing | "Stay the Night" (with Zedd) | Nominated | |
| MTV Video Music Awards | 2014 | MTV Clubland Award | "Stay the Night" (with Zedd) | Won | |
| MTV Video Music Brazil | 2008 | Best International Act | Herself with Paramore | Won | |
| NME Awards | 2009 | Sexiest Female | Herself | Won | |
| NME Awards | 2012 | Hottest Female | Herself | Nominated | |
| People's Choice Awards | 2011 | Favorite Song | "Airplanes" (with B.o.B) | Nominated | |
| Teen Choice Awards | 2010 | Hook Up Song | "Airplanes" (with B.o.B) | Won | |
