= Leave It Alone (Hayley Williams song) =

Single by Hayley Williams

from the EP Petals for Armor I and the album Petals for Armor
- Released: January 30, 2020
- Recorded: Early 2019
- Genre: Indie pop; dark pop
- Length: 4:05
- Label: Atlantic
- Songwriter(s): Hayley Williams; Joseph Howard
- Producer(s): Taylor York

Hayley Williams singles chronology
"Simmer" (2020)	"Leave It Alone" (2020)	"Roses/Lotus/Violet/Iris" (2020)

Music video
- "Leave It Alone" on YouTube

"Leave It Alone" is a song by American singer-songwriter and Paramore front-woman Hayley Williams. It was released on January 30, 2020, by Atlantic Records for digital download and to streaming platforms and serves as the second single for Williams' debut solo EP, Petals for Armor I. The song was written by Williams and Joseph Howard and was produced by Taylor York.

== Background ==
On January 22, 2020, Williams announced her debut solo EP, Petals for Armor I, its release date and released its lead single, "Simmer", accompanied with its music video. Williams released a music video, entitled "Simmer Interlude", which teased a sequel video to "Simmer" would follow-up its music video.

Upon its release, in a statement accompanying the album's announcement, Williams said the project "benefited from a little bit of musical naïveté and rawness" and said it was the product of experimentation. "I'm excited to let people in to experience a different side of myself that I've only very recently become familiar with," she added.

== Composition ==
"Leave It Alone" was written by Hayley Williams and Joseph "Joey" Howard while production was handled by Taylor York. The track runs 89 BPM and is in the key of D minor. The song's production has been compared to the works of Radiohead. It has been labeled an indie pop and dark pop song.

== Music video ==
The music video for "Leave It Alone" was directed by Warren Fu and serves as a sequel to its predecessor "Simmer". It premiered on the same day as the single's release. Another music video, "Leave It Alone Interlude", premiered on February 3, 2020.

== Release history ==
Country	Date	Format	Label	Ref.
United States	January 30, 2020	Digital download; streaming	Atlantic; RRP	
