= Canon Blue =

Music project by Daniel James

Canon Blue is an indie/electronic/folktronica project by Nashville-based artist/producer Daniel James. On October 6, 2011, the NPR radio show World Cafe called the band "up and coming". The project's debut album Colonies was released on Rumraket Records on 17 September 2007. It was mixed by Chris Taylor and mastered by Cristian Vogel. Canon Blue opened for several Foster the People shows in June 2011 and their song "Indian Summer (Des Moines)" was featured on NPR as October 28, 2011's "Song-of-the-day". Canon Blue's sophomore album, Rumspringa, was also produced by Rumraket and was released on August 29, 2011. Musical collaborators on this album include Chris Taylor, Amiina, and Slaraffenland. A third album, Lasso Yo, was released on Temporary Residence in 2017.

== Discography ==
- Colonies (Rumraket, 2007)
- Rumspringa (Rumraket, 2011)
- Lasso Yo (Temporary Residence, 2017)
