= Bullet for My Valentine discography =

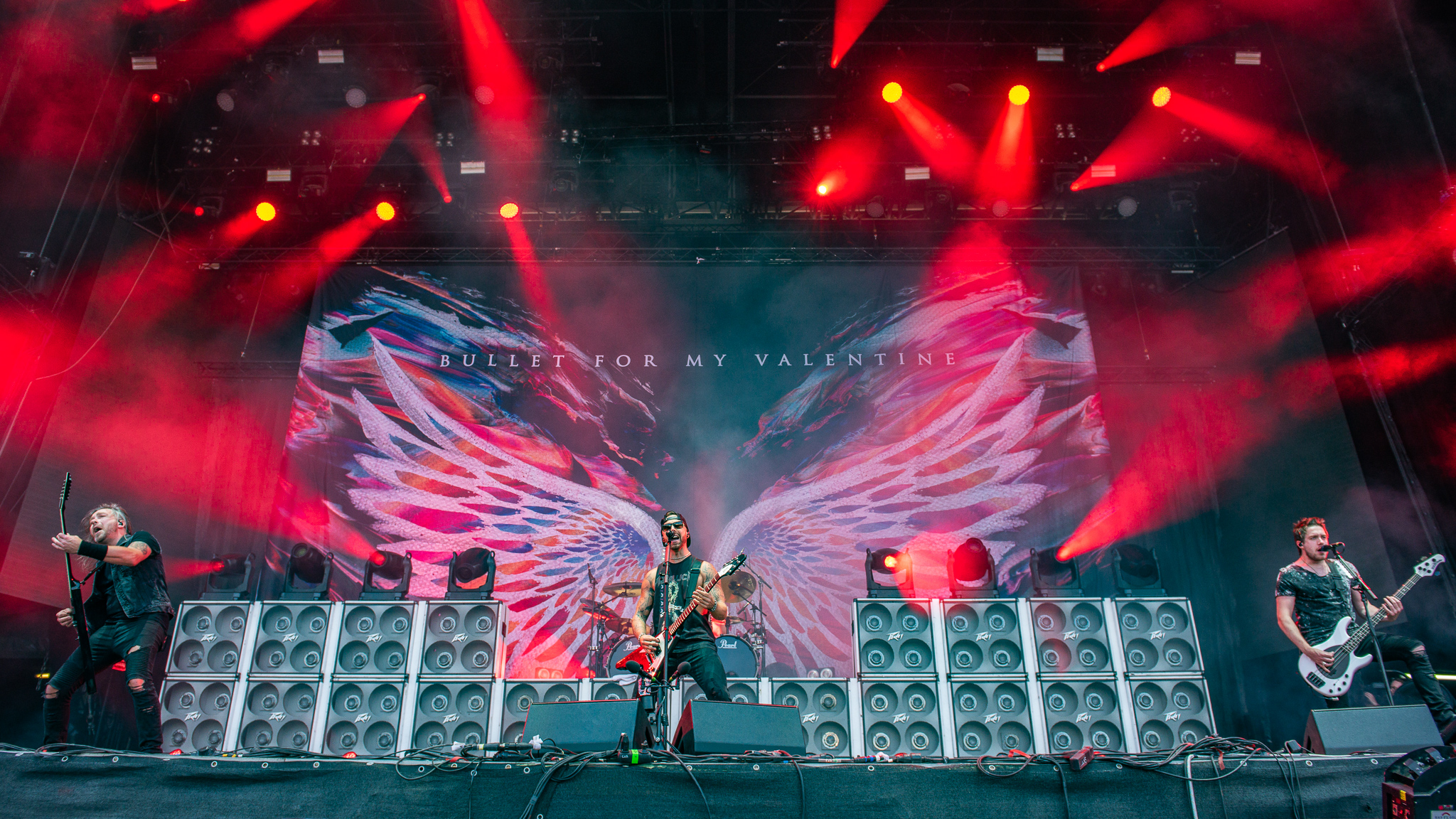
- Bullet for My Valentine performing at Rock im Park in 2018
- Studio albums: 7
- Extended plays: 5
- Live albums: 4
- Singles: 33
- Video albums: 4
- Music videos: 32

The discography of Bullet for My Valentine, a Welsh heavy metal band, is composed of seven studio albums, four live albums, five EPs and four video albums, from which thirty-three singles and thirty-two music videos have been released. In addition, a live DVD has also been released. The band has stated that their music is influenced by classic metal acts such as Metallica, Iron Maiden and Slayer. The band is part of the Cardiff music scene.

The band has sold over 2 million albums in the United States and over 5 million albums worldwide and are the most successful act in the Kerrang! Awards category of "Best British Band" with three wins.

== Studio albums ==
Title	Album details	Peak chart positions												Sales	Certifications
Title	Album details	UK	AUS	AUT	FIN	FRA	GER	JPN	NZ	SPA	SWE	SWI	US	Sales	Certifications
The Poison	Released: 14 February 2006 (US) 3 October 2005 (UK); Label: Trustkill, Visible Noise	21	—	43	—	—	25	37	—	—	—	—	128	US: 575,000	BPI: Gold; BVMI: Platinum; RIAA: Gold
Scream Aim Fire	Released: 29 January 2008; Label: Jive	5	4	3	8	38	3	15	29	—	5	18	4	US: 360,000	BPI: Gold; ARIA: Gold; BVMI: Gold
Fever	Released: 27 April 2010; Label: Jive	5	5	2	3	25	3	8	9	80	14	7	3	US: 207,000	BPI: Gold; RMNZ: Gold
Temper Temper	Released: 12 February 2013; Label: RCA	11	4	3	5	51	5	17	14	85	19	9	13	US: 340,000	
Venom	Released: 14 August 2015; Label: RCA	3	1	2	4	42	2	9	8	66	46	1	8	US: 50,000	BPI: Silver
Gravity	Released: 29 June 2018; Label: Spinefarm	13	10	7	12	59	7	34	—	50	47	6	17		
Bullet for My Valentine	Released: 5 November 2021; Label: Spinefarm	13	17	8	16	132	9	27	—	—	— (Note: Bullet for My Valentine did not enter the Official Swedish Charts, but peaked at number 13 on the Swedish Hard Rock Albums Chart.)	11	153	UK: 4,982	
Social Apocalypse	Scheduled: 19 March 2027; Label: Spinefarm	—	—	—	—	—	—	—	—	—	—	—	—		
"—" denotes a recording that did not chart or was not released in that territory.

== Extended plays ==
Title	Extended play details	Peak chart positions		
Title	Extended play details	UK	GER	JPN
Bullet for My Valentine	Released: 15 November 2004; Label: Visible Noise	186	—	176
Hand of Blood	Released: 22 August 2005; Label: Trustkill	101	—	—
Hand of Blood: Live at Brixton	Released: 20 October 2006; Label: Trustkill	—	91	—
Rare Cuts	Released: 8 August 2007; Label: Trustkill	—	—	210
Live From Kingston	Released: 16 October 2015; Label: RCA	—	—	—
"—" denotes a recording that did not chart or was not released in that territory.

== Singles ==
Title	Year	Peak chart positions										Certifications	Album
Title	Year	UK	UK Rock	AUS	FIN	GER	IRL	SWE	US Main.	US Alt.	US Rock	Certifications	Album
"4 Words (To Choke Upon)"	2005	40	3	—	—	—	—	—	—	—	—		The Poison
"Suffocating Under Words of Sorrow (What Can I Do)"	2005	37	2	—	—	—	—	—	—	—	—		The Poison
"All These Things I Hate (Revolve Around Me)"	2006	29	2	—	16	39	38	—	13	30	—		The Poison
"Tears Don't Fall"	2006	37	3	—	17	47	—	—	24	32	—	BPI: Gold; BVMI: Gold; RMNZ: Platinum	The Poison
"Scream Aim Fire"	2007	34	1	—	—	58	—	49	16	26	—		Scream Aim Fire
"Hearts Burst into Fire"	2008	66	—	—	—	99	—	—	22	—	—		Scream Aim Fire
"Waking the Demon"	2008	—	—	—	—	—	—	—	39	—	—		Scream Aim Fire
"Your Betrayal"	2010	197	10	—	—	—	—	—	5	25	18	BPI: Silver	Fever
"The Last Fight"	2010	92	2	-	—	—	—	—	—	—	—		Fever
"Bittersweet Memories"	2010	—	7	—	—	—	—	—	21	— (Note: "Bittersweet Memories" did not enter the US Billboard Alternative Airplay chart, but peaked at number 50 on the US Rock & Alternative Airplay chart.)	50		Fever
"Fever"	2011	104	34	—	—	—	—	—	28	—	— (Note: "Fever" did not enter the US Billboard Hot Rock Songs chart, but peaked at number 18 on the US Rock Digital Songs Sales chart.)		Fever
"Temper Temper"	2012	134	5	—	—	—	—	—	—	—	—		Temper Temper
"Riot"	2012	—	5	—	—	—	—	—	23	—	—		Temper Temper
"P.O.W."	2013	—	—	—	—	—	—	—	—	—	—		Temper Temper
"Breaking Point"	2013	—	—	—	—	—	—	—	36	—	—		Temper Temper
"Raising Hell"	2013	—	3	—	—	—	—	—	—	—	—		Venom
"No Way Out"	2015	178	3	—	—	—	—	—	—	— (Note: "No Way Out" did not enter the US Billboard Alternative Airplay chart, but peaked at number 24 on the US Alternative Digital Songs Sales chart.)	— (Note: "No Way Out" did not enter the US Billboard Hot Rock Songs chart, but peaked at number 34 on the US Rock Digital Songs Sales chart.)		Venom
"You Want a Battle? (Here's a War)"	2015	—	40	—	83	—	—	—	37	—	46		Venom
"Army of Noise"	2015	—	—	—	—	—	—	—	—	—	—		Venom
"Venom"	2015	—	—	—	—	—	—	—	—	—	—		Venom
"Worthless"	2016	—	—	—	—	—	—	—	—	—	—		Venom
"Don't Need You"	2016	— (Note: "Don't Need You" did not enter the UK Singles Chart, but peaked at number 38 on the UK Physical Singles Sales Chart.)	35	—	—	— (Note: "Don't Need You" did not enter the German Singles Chart, but peaked at number 2 on the Deutsche Alternative Singles Chart.)	—	—	—	— (Note: "Don't Need You" did not enter the US Billboard Alternative Airplay chart, but peaked at number 25 on the US Alternative Digital Songs Sales chart.)	49		Gravity
"Over It"	2018	—	—	—	—	—	—	—	20	—	—		Gravity
"Piece of Me"	2018	—	—	—	—	—	—	—	—	—	—		Gravity
"Letting You Go"	2018	—	—	—	—	— (Note: "Letting You Go" did not enter the German Singles Chart, but peaked at number 1 on the Deutsche Alternative Singles Chart.)	—	—	24	—	—		Gravity
"Knives"	2021	—	—	—	—	—	—	—	39	—	—		Bullet for My Valentine
"Parasite"	2021	—	—	—	—	—	—	—	—	—	—		Bullet for My Valentine
"Shatter"	2021	—	—	—	—	—	—	—	—	—	—		Bullet for My Valentine
"Rainbow Veins"	2021	—	—	—	—	—	—	—	27	—	—		Bullet for My Valentine
"Omen"	2022	—	—	—	—	—	—	—	—	—	—		Bullet for My Valentine
"Stitches"	2022	—	—	—	—	—	—	—	—	—	—		Bullet for My Valentine
"No More Tears to Cry"	2022	—	—	—	—	—	—	—	33	—	—		Bullet for My Valentine
"Halo" (featuring Pendulum)	2023	—	—	—	—	—	—	—	—	—	—		Inertia
"Social Apocalypse"	2026	—	—	—	—	—	—	—	39	—	—		Social Apocalypse
"I Don't Trust Tomorrow" (featuring Will Ramos)	2026	—	—	—	—	—	—	—	—	—	—		Social Apocalypse
"—" denotes a recording that did not chart or was not released in that territory.

== Other charted songs ==
Title	Year	Peak chart positions				Album
Title	Year	UK Sales	UK Rock	GER	SCO	Album
"Hand of Blood"	2004	58	1	65	43	Hand of Blood (EP)

== Other appearances ==
List of other appearances, showing year released and album name
Song	Year	Album	Comments
"Turn to Despair"	2004	Subverse Volume 2	Previously recorded by Jeff Killed John as "Nation2Nation". Only Bullet for My Valentine song not to appear on any of the band's releases.

== Videos ==
=== Video albums ===
- The Poison: Live at Brixton (2006)
- Scream Aim Fire: Live at London Alexandria (2009)
- Live from Brixton: Chapter Two (2017)

=== Music videos ===
Year	Title	Album	Director
2004	"Hand of Blood"	The Poison	Dan Fernbach
2005	"4 Words (To Choke Upon)"	The Poison	Dan Fernbach
2005	"Cries in Vain"	The Poison	Dan Fernbach
2005	"Suffocating Under Words of Sorrow (What Can I Do)"	The Poison	Miha Knific
2006	"All These Things I Hate (Revolve Around Me)"	The Poison	Scott Winig
2006	"Tears Don't Fall"	The Poison	Tony Petrossian
2007	"Scream Aim Fire"	Scream Aim Fire	Tony Petrossian
2008	"Hearts Burst into Fire"	Scream Aim Fire	Max Nichols
2008	"Waking the Demon"	Scream Aim Fire	Max Nichols
2010	"Your Betrayal"	Fever	P.R. Brown
2010	"Bittersweet Memories"	Fever	Nigel Dick
2011	"The Last Fight"	Fever	P.R. Brown
2012	"Temper Temper"	Temper Temper	Michael Dispenza
2013	"Riot"	Temper Temper	P.R. Brown
2013	"P.O.W."	Temper Temper	—N/a
2013	"Breaking Point"	Temper Temper	—N/a
2013	"Raising Hell"	Venom	James Sharrock
2015	"You Want a Battle? (Here's a War)"	Venom	Stuart Birchball
2015	"Army of Noise"	Venom	James Sharrock
2015	"Venom"	Venom	Stuart Birchall
2016	"Worthless"	Venom	Stuart Birchall
2016	"Don't Need You"	Gravity	Ville Juurikkala
2018	"Over It"	Gravity	Stuart Birchall
2018	"Letting You Go"	Gravity	Stuart Birchall
2018	"Not Dead Yet"	Gravity	Takahito Matsuno
2019	"Piece of Me"	Gravity	Ryan Chang
2021	"Knives"	Bullet for My Valentine	Fiona Garden and Carl Addy
2021	"Parasite"	Bullet for My Valentine	Fiona Garden
2021	"Shatter"	Bullet for My Valentine	Fiona Garden
2021	"Rainbow Veins"	Bullet for My Valentine	Carl Addy
2022	"Stitches"	Bullet for My Valentine	Carl Addy
2022	"No More Tears to Cry"	Bullet for My Valentine	Harry Lindley
2026	"Social Apocalypse"	Social Apocalypse	Chris Wade
2026	"I Don’t Trust Tomorrow"	Social Apocalypse	Chris Wade
