= Jeff Killed John (EP) =

EP by Jeff Killed John
- Released: 2003
- Recorded: 2002
- Genre: Nu metal
- Length: 22:43
- Label: Self-released

Jeff Killed John chronology
Don't Walk Away (2003)	Jeff Killed John (2003)	Bullet for My Valentine (2004)

Jeff Killed John is an EP by Welsh heavy metal band Bullet for My Valentine, under their original name Jeff Killed John. This EP marks the last recorded material by the band before the name change, as well as the last with bassist Nick Crandle, before Jason James replaced him. Many song elements from this EP would be reworked into later tracks for Bullet for My Valentine music: "Routine Unhappiness" contains riff elements that would later become "Tears Don't Fall," with lyrical content that would appear on "10 Years Today;" "Nation2Nation" would eventually become the sampler track "Turn to Despair"; and "All These Things I Hate (Revolve Around Me)" is an early demo of the song of the same name that would eventually appear on Bullet for My Valentine's debut album The Poison. Skindred vocalist Benji Webbe, who performs guest vocals in "Nation2Nation", would also be featured in the song "Take It Out on Me" from Bullet for My Valentine's second album Scream Aim Fire.

== Track listing ==
All tracks are written by Jeff Killed John.

No.	Title	Length
1.	"Our Song"	4:11
2.	"Routine Unhappiness"	4:29
3.	"Nation2Nation" (featuring Benji Webbe)	4:40
4.	"All These Things I Hate (Revolve Around Me)" (Demo)	4:17
5.	"Misery"	5:46
Total length:		22:43

== Personnel ==
Jeff Killed John

- Matthew Tuck – lead vocals, rhythm guitar, guitar solo on "Our Song"
- Michael "Padge" Paget – lead guitar, backing vocals
- Nick Crandle – bass guitar
- Michael "Moose" Thomas – drums
- Jason "Jay" James – bass guitar on "All These Things I Hate (Revolve Around Me)" and "Misery"
