= Tears Don't Fall =

- single cover artwork variants

Single by Bullet for My Valentine

from the album The Poison
- B-side: "Domination"
- Released: 17 June 2006
- Genre: Metalcore; emo
- Length: 5:48 (album version); 4:40 (single version)
- Label: Trustkill; Visible Noise
- Songwriter: Matthew Tuck

Bullet for My Valentine singles chronology
"All These Things I Hate (Revolve Around Me)" (2006)	"Tears Don't Fall" (2006)	"Scream Aim Fire" (2007)

Music video
- "Tears Don't Fall" on YouTube

"Tears Don't Fall" is a song by Welsh heavy metal band Bullet for My Valentine. It is the band's fourth single from their first full-length studio album, The Poison. The single was released on 17 June 2006 through Trustkill Records in the US. The song won the Kerrang! Award for Best Single. The song peaked at No. 24 on the Hot Mainstream Rock chart and No. 32 on the Alternative Rock chart. In 2013, the band released a sequel to the song called "Tears Don't Fall (Part 2)" on their fourth studio album, Temper Temper.

== Music video ==
The music video, directed by Tony Petrossian, shows the band playing in a place with heavy rain. The story of the video shows a woman and the man, who are seen doing romantic things with each other but when the woman (Taylor Cole) tries to continue the following day, the man will not let her as he seems to be tired of her. After a while of driving, the car loses fuel. After refueling the car, the woman tries to get close to the man and causes him to drop the barrel of fuel. He pushes her away, but the barrel has emptied, with the fuel spilled onto the ground. The man then gets in the car and drives away, leaving the girl running after the car. The man stops at a hotel, goes in and finds a blonde woman to replace the previous woman he left behind. The previous woman finally manages to walk to where the man is staying. She then enters the hotel room with the barrel he dropped earlier and proceeds to drench the new couple and herself with gasoline to commit murder-suicide by immolation. She then pulls out a lighter and drops it onto the bed but it doesn't ignite. The woman then smiles and blows a sarcastic kiss to the terrified pair cowering on the bed now realizing they were not going to die. The camera then shifts outside to a hose dripping water indicating she had used the hose to fill the barrel with water.

The other video again starts with the band playing in the rain. The story shows a man and woman doing romantic things in the car with the ex-girlfriend watching them in rage and sadness. Heartbroken and in tears, the ex goes to seek help from a voodoo witch doctor who makes her go through a ritual to put her in a blinding trance of anger, before finally receiving a voodoo doll cursed to imitate the man. In rage, she starts stabbing the doll, causing the man to feel the pain, then the doll falls into a pit of fire, which caused the car to explode, killing the man and woman inside. This version of the music video was directed by Scott Winig and produced by Micheal Kats.

As of May 1, 2026, the music video for "Tears Don't Fall" has 286,908,111 views on YouTube.

== Critical reception ==
"Tears Don't Fall" is one of Bullet for My Valentine's most popular songs and is often regarded as one of the band's greatest songs. It was featured in the band's live DVDs: The Poison: Live at Brixton, Rock am Ring 2006, Scream Aim Fire: Live at London Alexandria and Live from Brixton: Chapter Two.

Loudwire said: "Chances are, if your speakers were on when you clicked a scene kid's MySpace page in 2005, you were greeted with the unmistakable guitar opening of "Tears Don’t Fall."

=== Accolades ===
Publication	List	Rank
Loudwire	The 66 Best Metal Songs of the 21st Century	–
Metal Hammer	The 100 Greatest Metal Songs of the 21st Century	35

=== Kerrang! Awards ===
Year	Nominee / work	Award	Result	Ref.
2006	"Tears Don't Fall"	Best Single	Won	

== Track listings ==
"Tears Don't Fall" was released as a single in the UK in multiple different formats: two CD singles and one 7" LP single. All three formats were released on 17 July 2006 through Visible Noise Records. The individual track listings are as follows:

CD1

1. "Tears Don't Fall" – 4:40
2. "Domination" (Pantera cover) – 5:06
- An unreleased version of the "Tears Don't Fall" music video
- A desktop wallpaper

CD2

1. "Tears Don't Fall" (live at Brixton Academy) – 6:12
2. "4 Words (To Choke Upon)" (live at Brixton Academy) – 3:53
3. "Suffocating Under Words of Sorrow (What Can I Do)" (live at Brixton Academy) – 4:01

7" vinyl

1. "Tears Don't Fall" – 4:40
2. "Welcome Home (Sanitarium)" (Metallica cover) – 6:17

German EP

1. "Tears Don't Fall" – 4:40
2. "Domination" (Pantera cover) – 5:06
3. "Welcome Home (Sanitarium)" (Metallica cover) – 6:17
4. "Suffocating Under Words of Sorrow (What Can I Do)" (live at Brixton Academy) – 4:02
5. "4 Words (To Choke Upon)" (live at Brixton Academy) – 3:52

Online downloads

- "Tears Don't Fall" (CLA radio edit)

== Charts ==
Chart performance for "Tears Don't Fall"
Chart (2006)	Peak position
Finland (Suomen virallinen lista)	17
Germany (GfK)	47
Scottish Singles Sales (Official Charts)	28
UK Singles (Official Charts)	37
UK Rock & Metal (Official Charts)	3
US Mainstream Rock (Billboard)	24
US Alternative Airplay (Billboard)	32

== Certifications ==
Region	Certification	Certified units/sales
Germany (BVMI)	Gold	150,000^{‡}
New Zealand (RMNZ)	Platinum	30,000^{‡}
United Kingdom (BPI)	Gold	400,000^{‡}
^{‡} Sales+streaming figures based on certification alone.

== Personnel ==
- Matthew "Matt" Tuck – lead vocals, rhythm and lead guitar
- Michael "Padge" Paget – lead guitar, backing vocals
- Michael "Moose" Thomas – drums
- Jason "Jay" James – bass guitar, backing vocals
