= Raising Hell (Bullet for My Valentine song) =

Single by Bullet for My Valentine

from the album Venom
- Released: 18 November 2013
- Recorded: 2013
- Genre: Thrash metal
- Length: 4:33
- Songwriters: Matthew Tuck, Michael Paget, Michael Thomas, Jason James

Bullet for My Valentine singles chronology
"Breaking Point" (2013)	"Raising Hell" (2013)	"No Way Out" (2015)

"Raising Hell" is a song by Welsh heavy metal band Bullet for My Valentine. It was released on 18 November 2013 as a promotional single to showcase what the band's future material would sound like. The song is featured as a deluxe edition bonus track on the band's fifth album Venom. This is the final song that featured Jason James on bass after the band and him parted ways in February 2015.

== Background ==
On 13 November 2013, Bullet for My Valentine revealed through their official Facebook page they were working on a new song. A short snippet of the song was released on Matt Tuck's Vine profile on 15 November 2013. The song was first played on 18 November 2013 via BBC Radio 1's Rock Show. It was made available for streaming on 20 November 2013. A music video for the song was released a week later.

== Personnel ==
- Matthew Tuck - lead vocals, rhythm guitar
- Michael "Padge" Paget – lead guitar, backing vocals
- Michael "Moose" Thomas – drums, percussion
- Jason "Jay" James – bass guitar, backing vocals

== Chart ==
Chart (2013)	Peak position
UK Rock & Metal (OCC)	3
