= Bullet for My Valentine (EP) =

EP by Bullet for My Valentine
- Released: 15 November 2004 (EU/US); 20 July 2005 (Japan)
- Recorded: 2004
- Studio: Chapel Studios, Lincolnshire
- Genre: Metalcore
- Length: 18:04; 21:50 (Japanese version)
- Label: Visible Noise
- Producer: Colin Richardson

Bullet for My Valentine chronology
Jeff Killed John (2003)	Bullet for My Valentine (2004)	Hand of Blood (2005)

Bullet for My Valentine is the first EP by Welsh heavy metal band Bullet for My Valentine (not including EPs released as Jeff Killed John). It was released on 15 November 2004 through Visible Noise in the UK. The song "Hand of Blood" was released as a music video to promote the EP. The song "Cries in Vain" would later appear on the band's full-length debut, The Poison. This EP is not available on the U.S. version of iTunes.

All five songs would later be re-released in the US on Hand of Blood EP along with "4 Words (To Choke Upon)" (previously a Japanese bonus track) added to the beginning of the EP.

== Track listing ==
All tracks are written by Bullet for My Valentine

No.	Title	Length
1.	"Hand of Blood"	3:37
2.	"Cries in Vain"	4:00
3.	"Curses"	4:00
4.	"No Control"	3:34
5.	"Just Another Star"	2:53
Total length:		18:04

Japanese bonus track
No.	Title	Length
6.	"4 Words (To Choke Upon)"	3:46
Total length:		21:50

== Personnel ==
Bullet for My Valentine

- Matthew Tuck – lead vocals, rhythm guitar, guitar solo on track 1, bass guitar (uncredited)
- Michael "Padge" Paget – lead guitar, backing vocals
- Michael "Moose" Thomas – drums

Production

- Colin Richardson – production
- Dan Turner – engineer

== Charts ==
Chart (2004)	Peak position
UK Albums (OCC)	186
