= Rare Cuts =

Rare Cuts may refer to:

- Rare Cuts (album), an album by Danger Danger
- Rare Cuts (EP), an EP by Bullet for My Valentine

== See also ==
- Rare Cuts and Oddities 1966, an album by the Grateful Dead
