= Social Apocalypse =

Studio album by Bullet for My Valentine
- Released: 19 March 2027
- Genres: Metalcore; heavy metal; alternative metal
- Length: 40:04
- Label: Spinefarm
- Producer: Carl Bown

Bullet for My Valentine chronology
| Bullet for My Valentine (2021) | Social Apocalypse (2027) |

Singles from Social Apocalypse
- 1. "Social Apocalypse" Released: 24 September 2026; 2. "I Don't Trust Tomorrow" Released: 12 November 2026

Social Apocalypse is the upcoming eighth studio album by Welsh heavy metal band Bullet for My Valentine. It will be released on 19 March 2027 through Spinefarm Records and was produced by Carl Bown.

== Background ==
In celebration of the 20th anniversary of The Poison, the Bullet for My Valentine released a 20th anniversary edition of the album and announced 'The Poisoned Ascendancy' Tour with Trivium co-headlining for 2025, with Trivium celebrating the 20th anniversary of Ascendancy. Bullet for My Valentine also announced that they are in the studio to record their eighth studio album, with hopes to get the album out by 2025. The band pulled out of The Poisoned Ascendancy tour in May 2025, finishing the North American leg, despite initial plans to continue into regions such as South America and Australia into the end of 2025, with Trivium bassist Paolo Gregoletto putting the blame on Matt Tuck.

Bullet for My Valentine released a statement expressing that they decided to focus on the "next chapter", heading back to the studio in the summer to finish their upcoming album and planning to tour in 2026 and 2027, "hitting every corner". In July 2025, the band announced a three-day Australian tour in October for The Poison's anniversary, headlining alone.

== Release and promotion ==
The band's eighth studio album was originally set for release in January 2027, but it was later announced on 24 September 2026 that the album, titled Social Apocalypse, will be released on 19 March 2027. On the same day as the announcement, the album's titular lead single was released. On 12 November 2026, the album's second single was released, titled "I Don't Trust Tomorrow" and featuring Lorna Shore vocalist Will Ramos.

== Track listing ==
| No. | Title | Length |
|---|---|---|
| 1. | "Social Apocalypse" | 3:59 |
| 2. | "In the Absence of You" (featuring Chrissy Costanza of Against the Current) | 4:13 |
| 3. | "I Don't Trust Tomorrow" (featuring Will Ramos of Lorna Shore) | 3:39 |
| 4. | "Here Without You" | 4:08 |
| 5. | "Acid Rain" | 3:28 |
| 6. | "Fragile" | 3:53 |
| 7. | "CVLT" | 3:49 |
| 8. | "Masquerade" | 3:52 |
| 9. | "Read Between the Lines" | 4:40 |
| 10. | "Enough Is Never Enough" | 4:23 |
| Total length: | | 40:04 |

== Personnel ==
Bullet for My Valentine

- Matthew Tuck – lead vocals, rhythm guitar
- Michael "Padge" Paget – lead guitar, backing vocals
- Jamie Mathias – bass guitar, backing vocals
- Jason Bowld – drums, percussion

Additional personnel

- Carl Bown – production, engineering, mixing
