= Temper Temper (Bullet for My Valentine song) =

Single by Bullet for My Valentine

from the album Temper Temper
- Released: 22 October 2012
- Recorded: 2012
- Genre: Alternative metal
- Length: 3:08
- Label: RCA
- Songwriter(s): Matt Tuck; Michael Paget; Michael Thomas; Jason James
- Producer(s): Don Gilmore

Bullet for My Valentine singles chronology
"Fever" (2011)	"Temper Temper" (2012)	"Riot" (2012)

"Temper Temper" is a song by Welsh heavy metal band Bullet for My Valentine from their album Temper Temper. Its music video revolves around a group of people in a room with anger and fury issues. It is the only music video by the band without the members in it.

== Background and critical response ==
The song was produced by Don Gilmore and released on 23 October 2012, which got radio airplay. The song, however, did receive criticism from some fans due to its sound change.

== Personnel ==
- Matthew Tuck - lead vocals, rhythm guitar
- Michael "Padge" Paget – lead guitar, backing vocals
- Michael "Moose" Thomas – drums, percussion
- Jason James – bass guitar, backing vocals

== Charts ==
Chart (2012)	Peak position
UK Singles (OCC)	134
UK Rock & Metal (OCC)	5
