= Days of Worth =

English rock band

- Origin: Surrey
- Genres: Rock, Post-hardcore
- Years active: 2002 - 2006
- Label: Visible Noise
- Past members: Simon Ellis Griffiths, Alex Jarczok, Chris Gane, Kerry Lambert, Andy Green
- Website: MySpace

Days of Worth were a five-piece English rock band. Formed in 2002, they quickly forged their own variation on the UK rock sound of the time, influenced by the likes of Hundred Reasons, Hell Is For Heroes and more obscure bands such as Handsome and the Boston-based outfit Cave In. They also name early 1990s bands such as Soundgarden as influences.

In mid-2002 the band released their debut five-track EP, Extended Play, through indie label Alpha9. Four of the five tracks, "Ladies and Gentlemen", "State of Me", "Take Me Through" and "Narcolepsy" would later be re-recorded for their first album, The Western Mechanism. The fifth track, titled "Retainer", remains the only track to be exclusive to the EP.

Although the band were quick to distance themselves from their first recording it gained them a sizable local following and attracted the attention of London-based label Visible Noise, who signed them in early 2003.

The album The Western Mechanism was released in 2005 to great critical praise. However, despite continued support for the band from the rock press in the U.K, Days of Worth remained somewhat of an obscurity, and were eventually dropped by Visible Noise. They disbanded shortly after.

The band members were: Simon Ellis Griffiths (vocals), Alex Jarczok (guitar), Chris Gane (guitar), Kerry Lambert (bass) and Andy Green (drums).

Lambert went on to join the indie rock band Fin, and Griffiths joined post-hardcore band Radio Alcatraz in late 2010. On 1 August 2015 Days of Worth reunited to play a one-off gig celebrating the 10th anniversary of the release of The Western Mechanism.
