= Bullet for My Valentine (album) =

Studio album by Bullet for My Valentine
- Released: 5 November 2021
- Recorded: 2020
- Studios: Metropolis Studios (Chiswick); Treehouse Studios (Chesterfield, Derbyshire)
- Genres: Melodic metalcore; thrash metal; heavy metal
- Length: 47:43
- Label: Spinefarm
- Producer: Carl Bown

Bullet for My Valentine chronology
Gravity (2018)	Bullet for My Valentine (2021)	Social Apocalypse (2027)

Singles from Bullet for My Valentine
- 1. "Knives" Released: 18 June 2021; 2. "Parasite" Released: 23 July 2021; 3. "Shatter" Released: 10 September 2021; 4. "Rainbow Veins" Released: 1 October 2021

Deluxe edition cover
- Artwork used for the deluxe edition cover

Singles from Bullet for My Valentine (Deluxe Edition)
- 1. "Omen" Released: 8 April 2022; 2. "Stitches" Released: 27 May 2022; 3. "No More Tears to Cry" Released: 29 July 2022

Bullet for My Valentine is the seventh studio album by Welsh heavy metal band Bullet for My Valentine. It was released on 5 November 2021 through Spinefarm Records and was produced by Carl Bown.

== Background and promotion ==
On 19 May 2020, in an interview with Rock Sound, Tuck announced that the band was in the process of writing a new album. After several mixed-to-negative reviews by critics on Gravity, they decided to working on a new record which would be 'heavier' compared to the latest album. However, the production of the upcoming release, confirmed to be once again produced by Carl Bown, has been delayed due to the COVID-19 pandemic. Tuck commented about the upcoming album: "So it's not ideal, and we did have a lot of plans for the rest of the year for writing and making the record, which are on the backburner now until further notice. [...] It's pretty brutal, to be honest. It couldn't be more of a contrast with Gravity in a ferocious style. It's very technical. [...] The riffs are crushing. There's probably 60 percent aggressive vocals, 40 [percent] clean, which is a ratio we've never really dabbled with before. [...] It's very heavy, it's very technical. For the Bullet fans out there that kind of like that side of this band, it's very cool and very exciting. It feels good."

On 11 June 2021, Bullet for My Valentine unveiled a new Patreon page, The Army of Noise, posting that it is "the only place to get the latest BFMV news, early tix, BTS, merch discounts and exclusive items, signed gifts and more. Plus, a portion of each sub goes to the Teenage Cancer Trust." On 15 June, ahead of their headline slot at this weekend's Download Pilot, the band announced that they are planning to release new music on Friday, 18 June, with a 30-second video teaser hinting at some potentially heavy new music. On that day, the band officially released the new single "Knives" along with its music video. At the same time, they officially announced the album itself while also revealed the album cover, the release date and the track list. On 23 July, the band released the second single "Parasite" and its corresponding music video. On 10 September, the band released the third single "Shatter" alongside an accompanying music video. On 20 September, due to the ongoing COVID-19 pandemic and manufacturing delays, the band announced that they pushed back the release of the album to 5 November. On 1 October, one month before the album release, the band released the fourth single "Rainbow Veins". On 8 April 2022, the band released the fifth single "Omen" while also announcing the deluxe edition of the album which is set to be released on 8 July. At the same time, the band officially revealed the album cover and the track list. On 30 April, the band delayed the release of the deluxe edition from 8 July to 5 August. On 27 May, the group unveiled another single "Stitches". On 29 July, their seventh single, "No More Tears to Cry", was released.

== Reception ==
=== Critical reception ===
Professional ratings
Review scores
Source	Rating
Distorted Sound	6/10
Kerrang!	4/5 stars
Louder Sound	3.5/5 stars
New Noise	4.5/5 stars
Wall of Sound	8/10

The album received generally positive reviews from critics. Distorted Sound scored the album 6 out of 10 and said: "This record is nothing special, but it could lead to some interesting places. Somebody needs to buy Matthew Tuck a thesaurus to improve his clichéd lyric writing, but at no point will you find yourself laughing at anything, you just won't remember any of it. Their next record could really benefit from trimming down on the length of the songs, and not being afraid to continue down this path of aggression that has been missing with this band for a while. Perhaps the reason for self-titling this record will be this was the moment that Bullet for My Valentine decided to get their act together and take a brave step forward, rather than just present their audience with another record of rather forgettable melodic metal." Kerrang! gave the album 4 out of 5 and stated: "This is Bullet firing on all cylinders and it sounds absolutely immense." Louder Sound gave the album a positive review and stated: "Ultimately, this self-titled seventh offering is a decent, all-box-ticking Bullet album that will enamour fans of all eras. And granted, while it doesn't surpass the full-throttle glory of 2006 breakthrough The Poison, it's hard to see it delaying what seems like a determined charge back to metal's summits." New Noise gave the album 4.5 out of 5 and stated: "All in all, the album is an incredible piece of work that is definitely worthy of the name Bullet for My Valentine." Wall of Sound gave the album the score 8/10 and saying: "With Judas Priest celebrating 50 years, Iron Maiden a tick over 40 and Black Sabbath now long retired, one of the mid-2000s upstarts needed to step up after the lean 90s. While contemporaries Bring Me the Horizon are exciting and trend setting, they often leave metal to the side, so a Bullet for My Valentine with full artillery is a thing of beauty and necessity. Like their cross Atlantic peers Trivium, Bullet are a band whose time has come and Bullet for My Valentine is an album that deserves headline slots."

=== Accolades ===
Publication	Accolade	Rank
Kerrang!	The 50 Best Albums of 2021	36
Loudwire	The 35 Best Metal Songs of 2021 ("Knives")	18

== Track listing ==
Bullet for My Valentine track listing
No.	Title	Writer(s)	Length
1.	"Parasite"	Matt Tuck; Michael Paget	5:40
2.	"Knives"	Tuck; Paget; Jason Bowld	4:16
3.	"My Reverie"	Tuck; Paget	4:42
4.	"No Happy Ever After"	Tuck; Paget; Bowld	4:08
5.	"Can't Escape the Waves"	Tuck; Paget; Charlie Simpson	4:35
6.	"Bastards"	Tuck; Paget	5:25
7.	"Rainbow Veins"	Tuck; Paget	4:58
8.	"Shatter"	Tuck; Paget	5:24
9.	"Paralysed"	Tuck; Paget; Jamie Mathias	4:11
10.	"Death by a Thousand Cuts"	Tuck; Paget	4:24
Total length:			47:43

Japanese edition bonus track
No.	Title	Writer(s)	Length
11.	"Stitches"	Tuck; Paget	5:01
Total length:			52:44

Japanese limited edition bonus disc
No.	Title	Writer(s)	Length
1.	"Don't Need You" (live at Summer Sonic 2018)	Tuck; Bowld	5:32
2.	"Over It" (live at Summer Sonic 2018)	Tuck; Bowld	4:20
3.	"Your Betrayal" (live at Summer Sonic 2018)	Tuck; Paget; Michael Thomas; Jay James; Don Gilmore	5:21
4.	"Not Dead Yet" (live at Summer Sonic 2018)	Tuck; Bowld; Carl Bown; Drew Fulk	3:22
5.	"Letting You Go" (live at Summer Sonic 2018)	Tuck; Matt Schwartz; Rob Caggiano	4:07

2022 deluxe edition bonus tracks
No.	Title	Writer(s)	Length
11.	"Omen"	Tuck; Paget; Bowld; Mathias	3:53
12.	"Stitches"	Tuck; Paget	5:01
13.	"No More Tears to Cry"	Tuck; Paget; Bowld	3:41
14.	"Step Out from the Inside"	Tuck; Paget	4:11
15.	"This Means War"	Tuck; Paget	3:55
Total length:			68:24

== Personnel ==
Credits adapted from AllMusic.

Bullet for My Valentine

- Matthew Tuck – lead vocals, rhythm guitar
- Michael "Padge" Paget – lead guitar, backing vocals
- Jamie Mathias – bass guitar, backing vocals
- Jason Bowld – drums, percussion

Additional personnel

- Carl Bown – production, engineering, mixing
- Jim Pinder – engineering
- Ted Jensen – mastering
- Matt Ash, Niall Crisp, Don Jenkins and Craig Jennings – management
- Carl Addy and Yasmina Aoun – art direction

== Charts ==
Chart performance for Bullet for My Valentine
Chart (2021–22)	Peak position
Australian Albums (ARIA)	17
Austrian Albums (Ö3 Austria)	8
Belgian Albums (Ultratop Flanders)	93
Belgian Albums (Ultratop Wallonia)	117
Canadian Albums (Billboard)	98
European Albums (Billboard)	1
Finnish Albums (Suomen virallinen lista)	16
French Albums (SNEP)	132
German Albums (Offizielle Top 100)	9
Japanese Albums (Oricon)	27
Japanese Hot Albums (Billboard)	30
Scottish Albums (Official Charts)	16
Swedish Hard Rock Albums (Sverigetopplistan)	13
Swiss Albums (Schweizer Hitparade)	11
Swiss Albums (Romandie)	9
UK Albums (Official Charts)	13
UK Rock & Metal Albums (Official Charts)	1
US Billboard 200	153
US Independent Albums (Billboard)	27
US Top Hard Rock Albums (Billboard)	6
US Top Rock Albums (Billboard)	22
