= Suffocating Under Words of Sorrow (What Can I Do) =

Single by Bullet for My Valentine

from the album The Poison
- Released: 19 September 2005
- Studio: The Chapel; Backstage Studios; Nothing Pill; Cardiff Barfly
- Genre: Metalcore
- Length: 3:39
- Label: Visible Noise (UK)
- Songwriters: Matthew Tuck; Michael Paget; Michael Thomas; Jason James
- Producer: Colin Richardson

Bullet for My Valentine singles chronology
"4 Words (To Choke Upon)" (2005)	"Suffocating Under Words of Sorrow (What Can I Do)" (2005)	"All These Things I Hate (Revolve Around Me)" (2006)

"Suffocating Under Words of Sorrow (What Can I Do)" is the second single from Welsh heavy metal band Bullet for My Valentine, from their debut album, The Poison. It was released on 19 September 2005 through Visible Noise Records in the United Kingdom. It broke the top 40 for the band in the UK, peaking at number 37 on the UK Singles Chart. The song also peaked at number 2 on the UK Rock Chart.

The single was released in three formats, one CD and two 7" vinyls. Two of the three formats featured one live song from their debut album, The Poison.

The song also appears on the soundtrack of Saw III. A music video was released for the song and was directed by Miha Knific.

== Background and writing ==
The band wrote "Suffocating Under Words Of Sorrow" at Chapel Studios. Singer Matt Tuck said regarding the track's writing process: "We spent a lot of time there working on the songs for The Poison and Suffocating must’ve come about at like 11 O'clock on a Monday night. We’d all had a few glasses of wine and were sitting around a pool table playing guitars. The song’s riff came up and we composed it all in about an hour. Next day we tracked it and it was all done, super quick, super spontaneous and there was no overthinking."

== Track listing ==
Promo CD (special radio and DJ edit, red cover)
No.	Title	Length
1.	"Suffocating Under Words of Sorrow (What Can I Do)" (radio edit)	3:29
2.	"Suffocating Under Words of Sorrow (What Can I Do)" (album edit)	3:39

CD (red cover)
No.	Title	Length
1.	"Suffocating Under Words of Sorrow (What Can I Do)"	3:39
2.	"Spit You Out" (live at Cardiff Barfly)	4:15
Total length:		7:54

7" one (blue cover)
No.	Title	Length
1.	"Suffocating Under Words of Sorrow (What Can I Do)"	3:39
2.	"Room 409" (live at Cardiff Barfly)	4:00
Total length:		7:39

7" two (green cover)
No.	Title	Length
1.	"Suffocating Under Words of Sorrow (What Can I Do)"	3:39
Total length:		3:39

== Personnel ==
- Matthew "Matt" Tuck – lead vocals, rhythm and lead guitar, guitar solo
- Michael "Padge" Paget – rhythm and lead guitar
- Michael "Moose" Thomas – drums
- Jason "Jay" James – bass, backing vocals

== Charts ==
Chart (2005)	Peak position
UK Singles (Official Charts)	37
UK Rock & Metal (Official Charts)	2
