= All These Things I Hate (Revolve Around Me) =

Single by Bullet for My Valentine

from the album The Poison
- Released: 3 February 2006
- Studio: The Chapel; Backstage Studios; Notting Pill Studios
- Genre: Melodic metalcore; alternative metal
- Length: 3:45
- Label: Sony BMG (EP); Visible Noise (UK single)
- Songwriters: Matthew Tuck; Michael Paget; Michael Thomas; Jason James
- Producer: Colin Richardson

Bullet for My Valentine singles chronology
"Suffocating Under Words of Sorrow (What Can I Do)" (2005)	"All These Things I Hate (Revolve Around Me)" (2006)	"Tears Don't Fall" (2006)

"All These Things I Hate (Revolve Around Me)" is a song produced by the Welsh heavy metal band Bullet for My Valentine. The song was released as the third single from the band's debut album The Poison, through Sony BMG on 3 February 2006 in Europe and released in United Kingdom through Visible Noise on 7 February 2006. The band originally recorded the song on their 2003 Jeff Killed John EP. It is their highest-charting single in the UK, peaking at number 29. It is arguably the softest song on The Poison due to its use of an acoustic guitar and minimal screaming.

== Background and lyrics ==
The song's lyrics explore themes such as long-distance relationships. Singer Matt Tuck wrote it on a "beat-up" Spanish guitar when his girlfriend left for university.

== Reception ==
Stylus Magazine said that the song "doesn't work" on The Poison album because its "quiet/loud dynamic" does not explore the full dynamic. Music Emissions gave the song a very positive review, saying that it was the highlight of an otherwise "gimmicky" album, the song featuring interwoven acoustic guitar lines and harmony vocals (delivered by lead singer Matthew Tuck) during the song's introduction section. Punk News reviewed the song as "a nice respite from the [otherwise] drab" songs on the album, because of its acoustic intro.

== Music video ==
The music video, directed and enacted by Scott Winig, depicts a series of what seems like predictions made by a young woman (Kayla Jane). It starts off showing the outside of a motel, and flips inside to show a young couple. The boyfriend leaves the room, walks out onto the driveway, and gets into his car. His girlfriend follows him out shortly after because he forgot his necklace. As soon as he pulls out into the road, he is slammed in to by a truck, thus killing him. This is revealed to be a nightmare, thought up by the girlfriend. These series of events repeat a few times, with minor variations each time. The last time the girlfriend wakes up, the "predictions" of what she thought was going to happen seem to be proven false. One of the final shots is of the girlfriend looking out a window and seeing the truck that would have killed her boyfriend pass by. However, the boyfriend is not there. Between the shots of the couple, there are shots of the band playing in a graveyard and the video ends with Matt Tuck crouching over what seems to be the coffin of the boyfriend.

The video was taken down from the official Bullet For My Valentine YouTube channel, before being re-uploaded on August 24, 2023.

== Track listing ==
=== European track listing ===
"All These Things I Hate (Revolve Around Me)" CD one

1. "All These Things I Hate (Revolve Around Me)"
2. "Room 409" (live)

"All These Things I Hate (Revolve Around Me)" CD two

1. "All These Things I Hate (Revolve Around Me)"
2. "Room 409" (live)
3. "7 Days"
4. "My Fist, Your Mouth, Her Scars"
5. "All These Things I Hate (Revolve Around Me)" (music video)

=== UK singles release ===
"All These Things I Hate (Revolve Around Me)" was released in two formats in the UK. These were in the form of two CD singles. They were both released through Visible Noise on 6 February 2006 in the UK. Here are the track listings:

"All These Things I Hate (Revolve Around Me)" CD one

1. "All These Things I Hate (Revolve Around Me)"
2. "7 Days"

"All These Things I Hate (Revolve Around Me)" CD two

1. "All These Things I Hate (Revolve Around Me)"
2. "My Fist, Your Mouth, Her Scars"
3. "Enhanced content" including the music video for "All These Things I Hate (Revolve Around Me)" and two desktop wallpapers

== Chart performance ==
Chart (2006–2007)	Peak position
Finland (Suomen virallinen lista)	16
Germany (GfK)	39
Ireland (IRMA)	38
Scotland Singles (Official Charts)	29
UK Singles (Official Charts)	29
UK Rock & Metal (Official Charts)	2
US Mainstream Rock (Billboard)	13
US Alternative Airplay (Billboard)	30

== Personnel ==
- Matthew "Matt" Tuck – lead vocals, rhythm and lead guitar
- Michael "Padge" Paget – lead guitar, backing vocals
- Jason "Jay" James – bass guitar, backing vocals
- Michael "Moose" Thomas – drums
