= You Want a Battle? (Here's a War) =

Single by Bullet for My Valentine

from the album Venom
- Released: 29 June 2015
- Genre: Metalcore; thrash metal
- Length: 4:14
- Label: RCA
- Songwriter(s): Michael Paget; Michael Thomas; Matthew Tuck
- Producer(s): Colin Richardson; Carl Bown

Bullet for My Valentine singles chronology
"No Way Out" (2015)	"You Want a Battle? (Here's a War)" (2015)	"Army of Noise" (2015)

"You Want a Battle? (Here's a War)" is a song by Welsh heavy metal band Bullet for My Valentine. It was released on 29 June 2015, as the second single from the album Venom.

== Music video ==
The music video for "You Want a Battle? (Here's a War)" shows clips of the band performing the song and of the story about a woman and her daughter suffering from domestic violence at the hands of her husband, resulting in them spiking his drink with sleeping pills and setting the house on fire.

== Personnel ==
- Matthew Tuck – lead vocals, rhythm guitar
- Michael "Padge" Paget – lead guitar, backing vocals
- Michael "Moose" Thomas – drums, percussion, backing vocals
- Jamie Mathias - bass guitar, backing vocals
- Carl Bown, Dan Brown, Austin Dickinson, Ryan Richards, Stefan Whiting, Jack Vallier, Henry Boeree, Rebekah Power, Emma Gorman, Lauren Metccalf, Alice Williams, Andrew Humphries, Ginnie Breakwell – additional vocals

== Charts ==
Chart (2015)	Peak position
UK Rock & Metal (OCC)	40
US Mainstream Rock (Billboard)	37
US Hot Rock & Alternative Songs (Billboard)	46
