= 4 Words (To Choke Upon) =

Single by Bullet for My Valentine

from the album The Poison
- Released: 28 March 2005
- Studio: The Chapel; Backstage Studios; Nothing Pill; Cardiff Barfly
- Genre: Metalcore
- Length: 3:50
- Label: Visible Noise
- Songwriters: Matthew Tuck; Michael Paget; Michael Thomas; Jason James
- Producer: Colin Richardson

Bullet for My Valentine singles chronology
"Hand of Blood" (2004)	"4 Words (To Choke Upon)" (2005)	"Suffocating Under Words of Sorrow (What Can I Do)" (2005)

"4 Words (To Choke Upon)" is a song from Welsh heavy metal band Bullet for My Valentine. It was released on March 28, 2005, through Visible Noise Records, as the first single from their debut album The Poison. It is also featured on the soundtrack of EA Sports' Madden NFL 06 and NHL 06 video games.

== Track listing ==
UK single
No.	Title	Length
1.	"4 Words (To Choke Upon)"	3:43
2.	"Curses" (unedited)	4:34

Japan single
No.	Title	Length
1.	"4 Words (To Choke Upon)"	3:43
2.	"Hand of Blood"	3:38

== Personnel ==
- Matthew Tuck – lead vocals, rhythm and lead guitar
- Michael "Padge" Paget – lead guitar, backing vocals
- Michael "Moose" Thomas – drums, percussion
- Jason "Jay" James – bass, backing vocals

== Charts ==
Chart (2005)	Peak positions
Scottish Singles Sales (Official Charts)	46
UK Singles (Official Charts)	40
UK Rock & Metal (Official Charts)	3
