= Hand of Blood =

EP by Bullet for My Valentine
- Released: 22 August 2005
- Recorded: 2004
- Studio: The Chapel; Backstage Studios; Notting Pill Studios
- Genre: Metalcore
- Length: 21:46
- Label: Trustkill
- Producer: Colin Richardson

Bullet for My Valentine chronology
Bullet for My Valentine (2004)	Hand of Blood (2005)	The Poison (2005)

Singles from Hand of Blood
- 1. "Hand of Blood" Released: 2004

Hand of Blood is the second EP by Welsh heavy metal band Bullet for My Valentine, released on 22 August 2005 through Trustkill Records. The EP is a reissue of the 2004 self-titled EP with slightly altered track listing and new artwork. Hand of Blood included the single "4 Words (To Choke Upon)", which was initially a Japan-only bonus track included on the aforementioned EP. This release also spawned accompanying music videos for "4 Words" and "Hand of Blood". The songs "4 Words (To Choke Upon)" and "Cries in Vain" were later included on the band's full-length debut, The Poison. The title track also appears on the limited edition of the same album.

AllMusic asserted that the EP is "essentially a deluxe version" of the band's self-titled 2004 EP.

== Appearances in other media ==
The song "Hand of Blood" is featured in the video game Burnout Revenge in the in-game soundtrack, as well as in Need for Speed: Most Wanted. "4 Words (To Choke Upon)" is featured in the soundtrack for NHL 06 and Madden NFL 06.

== Critical reception ==
Daniel Lukes of Decibel Magazine believed that, although the music itself wasn't bad for what it was, it was, in his opinion, not original enough. He is quoted asking: "How much louder can you scream that you’re ready and willing to grab some, any, all of Atreyu and Avenged Sevenfold’s fanbase, and that you’ll entirely forsake the chance to step out on your own?" He finished the review saying: "This band is being groomed for big things, even though it’s damned hard to see how, in the short time it’ll probably take them to get there, they’ll be able to acquire the kind of self-awareness it’ll take to be as embarrassed as they should be about this first EP." Zeromag's Josh Joyce complimented the band on "how technical they can get without confusing the kids".

"Damrod" of Sputnikmusic gave the EP a solid 4/5 stars, stating that "the songs are played well and show a lot of potential for the future". He continues to say that the guitar work shows obvious influences such as Iron Maiden and Metallica, without sounding "like a rip-off of these bands". Damrod wrote that the singing style was a successful blend of screams and clean vocals, citing "Hand of Blood" and the chorus of "Just Another Star" as great examples.

== Track listing ==
All tracks are written by Bullet for My Valentine.

No.	Title	Length
1.	"4 Words (To Choke Upon)"	3:44
2.	"Hand of Blood"	3:36
3.	"Cries in Vain"	3:59
4.	"Curses" (edited)	3:59
5.	"No Control"	3:34
6.	"Just Another Star"	2:54
Total length:		21:46

Enhanced materials
No.	Title	Length
1.	"4 Words (To Choke Upon)" (music video)	3:44
2.	"Hand of Blood" (music video)	3:36

== Personnel ==
Bullet for My Valentine

- Matthew Tuck – lead vocals, rhythm guitar, bass guitar (uncredited), guitar solo on track 1 and 5
- Michael "Padge" Paget – lead guitar, backing vocals
- Michael "Moose" Thomas – drums

Note: Jason James is credited for bass within the album, but did not actually play.

Production

- Colin Richardson – production
- Dan Turner – engineering
