= Gravity (Bullet for My Valentine album) =

Studio album by Bullet for My Valentine
- Released: 29 June 2018
- Recorded: 2016–2017
- Studios: Metropolis Studios, London, England
- Genres: Alternative metal; hard rock; post-hardcore; nu metal
- Length: 41:47
- Label: Spinefarm
- Producer: Carl Bown

Bullet for My Valentine chronology
Venom (2015)	Gravity (2018)	Bullet for My Valentine (2021)

Singles from Gravity
- 1. "Don't Need You" Released: 6 November 2016; 2. "Over It" Released: 1 April 2018; 3. "Piece of Me" Released: 27 April 2018; 4. "Letting You Go" Released: 18 May 2018

Deluxe edition cover
- Artwork used for the deluxe edition cover

Gravity is the sixth studio album by Welsh heavy metal band Bullet for My Valentine. The album was released on 29 June 2018 via Spinefarm Records, their first album under the label. It is the first album with former Pitchshifter drummer Jason Bowld, who joined in 2016 to replace founding drummer Michael "Moose" Thomas. It is also the first album to feature bassist Jamie Mathias as a contributing member. Gravity represents a significant change in sound compared to the band's previous releases, moving toward the nu metal sound similar to their early years as "Jeff Killed John".

On 1 April 2018, Bullet for My Valentine debuted "Over It", the first single from Gravity, on BBC Radio 1.

Professional ratings
Review scores
Source	Rating
Distorted Sound Magazine	2.0/5 stars
MetalSucks	0.5/5 stars
Exclaim!	3.0/5 stars
Metal Hammer	3.5/5 stars
Sputnikmusic	2.0/5 stars
Blabbermouth.net	2.5/5 stars

== Critical reception ==
Upon its release, Gravity received mixed-to-negative reviews from critics, primarily due to the band's departure from their signature metalcore/thrash metal sound to a more nu metal style. Jeff Treppel of MetalSucks gave the album an extremely negative 0.5 out of 5, criticizing the sound for being a "bastard hybrid of Linkin Park-style radio rock" as well as the album's lyrical content and Matt Tuck's vocals. A significantly more positive review came from Lukas Wojcicki of Exclaim!, who stated that the "newly implemented formula works as intended", and commented that the "tracks are easily digestible and regrettably catchy", although stated that "metal purists" would find the album "frustrating".

== Track listing ==
No.	Title	Writer(s)	Length
1.	"Leap of Faith"	Matt Tuck; Jason Bowld; Jamie Mathias; Carl Bown	3:19
2.	"Over It"	Tuck; Bowld	3:47
3.	"Letting You Go"	Tuck; Matt Schwartz; Rob Caggiano	3:43
4.	"Not Dead Yet"	Tuck; Bowld; Bown; Michael Paget; Drew Fulk	3:21
5.	"The Very Last Time"	Tuck; Bown	3:57
6.	"Piece of Me"	Tuck; Bowld	3:26
7.	"Under Again"	Tuck; Schwartz	4:10
8.	"Gravity"	Tuck; Bowld	4:00
9.	"Coma"	Tuck; Bowld; Bown; Fulk	3:33
10.	"Don't Need You"	Tuck; Bowld	4:50
11.	"Breathe Underwater"	Tuck; Bown; Charlie Simpson	3:41
Total length:			41:47

Deluxe edition bonus tracks
No.	Title	Writer(s)	Length
12.	"Radioactive" (Imagine Dragons cover)	Alexander Grant; Ben McKee; Josh Mosser; Daniel Platzman; Dan Reynolds; Wayne Sermon	3:10
13.	"Letting You Go" (Zardonic remix)	Tuck; Schwartz; Caggiano	5:14
Total length:			50:06

United Kingdom and Target exclusive bonus tracks
No.	Title	Writer(s)	Length
12.	"Breaking Out"	Tuck; Bowld	3:27
13.	"Crawling"	Tuck; Bowld	3:54
Total length:			49:08

Japanese edition bonus tracks
No.	Title	Writer(s)	Length
12.	"Breaking Out"	Tuck; Bowld	3:27
13.	"Crawling"	Tuck; Bowld	3:54
14.	"Breathe Underwater" (piano version)	Tuck; Bown; Simpson	3:41
15.	"The Very Last Time" (piano version)	Tuck; Bown	3:57
16.	"Under Again" (piano version)	Tuck; Schwartz	4:10
17.	"Don't Need You" (live from O2 Brixton Academy on 10 December 2016)	Tuck; Bowld	4:50
Total length:			1:09:24

Digital deluxe edition
No.	Title	Writer(s)	Length
12.	"Breaking Out"	Tuck; Bowld	3:27
13.	"Crawling"	Tuck; Bowld	3:54
14.	"Radioactive" (Imagine Dragons cover)	Alexander Grant; Ben McKee; Josh Mosser; Daniel Platzman; Dan Reynolds; Wayne Sermon	3:10
15.	"Letting You Go" (Zardonic remix)	Tuck; Schwartz; Caggiano	5:14
16.	"Breathe Underwater" (piano version)	Tuck; Bown; Simpson	3:41
17.	"The Very Last Time" (piano version)	Tuck; Bown	3:57
18.	"Under Again" (piano version)	Tuck; Schwartz	4:10
19.	"Don't Need You" (live from O2 Brixton Academy on 10 December 2016)	Tuck; Bowld	4:50
Total length:			1:14:10

== Personnel ==
Bullet for My Valentine

- Matt Tuck – lead vocals, rhythm guitar
- Michael "Padge" Paget – lead guitar, backing vocals
- Jamie Mathias – bass guitar, backing vocals
- Jason Bowld – drums

Technical

- Carl Bown – production, mixing, keyboards
- Colin Richardson – production on "Don't Need You"
- Alex Robinson – mixing assistant
- Daniel Holub – art direction, design
- Ted Jensen – mastering at Sterling Sound, NYC

== Charts ==
Chart (2018)	Peak position
Australian Albums (ARIA)	10
Austrian Albums (Ö3 Austria)	7
Belgian Albums (Ultratop Flanders)	21
Belgian Albums (Ultratop Wallonia)	27
Canadian Albums (Billboard)	18
Czech Albums (ČNS IFPI)	29
Dutch Albums (Album Top 100)	65
Finnish Albums (Suomen virallinen lista)	12
German Albums (Offizielle Top 100)	7
Hungarian Albums (MAHASZ)	27
Japan Hot Albums (Billboard Japan)	50
Japanese Albums (Oricon)	34
Norwegian Albums (VG-lista)	39
Scottish Albums (Official Charts)	15
Slovak Albums (ČNS IFPI)	87
Spanish Albums (PROMUSICAE)	50
Swedish Albums (Sverigetopplistan)	47
Swiss Albums (Schweizer Hitparade)	6
UK Albums (Official Charts)	13
UK Rock & Metal Albums (Official Charts)	2
US Billboard 200	17
US Top Hard Rock Albums (Billboard)	2
US Top Rock Albums (Billboard)	6
