= Temper Temper (Bullet for My Valentine album) =

Studio album by Bullet for My Valentine
- Released: 8 February 2013
- Recorded: 2012
- Studios: Karma Sound Studios (Bang Saray, Thailand); Soundworks (Cardiff Bay, Wales); The Atrium (Cardiff, Wales); Rockfield (Monmouth, Wales)
- Genres: Heavy metal; hard rock
- Length: 44:25
- Label: Sony Music • RCA
- Producer: Don Gilmore

Bullet for My Valentine chronology
Fever (2010)	Temper Temper (2013)	Venom (2015)

Singles from Temper Temper
- 1. "Temper Temper" Released: 22 October 2012; 2. "Riot" Released: 17 December 2012; 3. "P.O.W." Released: 24 May 2013; 4. "Breaking Point" Released: 7 June 2013

Temper Temper is the fourth studio album by Welsh heavy metal band Bullet for My Valentine. The album was released on 8 February 2013 in Australia, and 11 February 2013 worldwide under RCA Records, their first under the label. The album was produced by Don Gilmore, who also produced the group's previous album, 2010's Fever, and was mixed by noted engineer Chris Lord-Alge. This would be the last album recorded with their full original lineup, including longtime bassist Jason James, before he left the band in February of 2015.

== Background and recording ==
Temper Temper was recorded in Thailand. Michael Paget and Jason James were not included in the writing and recording process, though the reasons were not immediately clear. Matt Tuck said: "When things need to be done I’m not afraid of decisions that aren’t going to be popular. There were certain things going on that people needed to sort out. At the same time we needed to get work done. Everyone, me included, lost perspective on what’s important. In a way it was tainted before it had even begun." Paget stated that it hurt his feelings when they left for Thailand without him. He recounted in 2015: "It really pissed me off, to be honest. Being told over email that you’re not going to record an album with your band. I’m sure it would piss anyone off. I was fucking confused, hurt – and I just didn’t understand it. Do I think it was for the best in the long run? No, I don’t, because our momentum kind of leveled off. I don’t want to dwell on the bad times because it’s all so good now."

== Release ==
The band debuted the album's title track live on 22 October 2012 as part of BBC Radio 1's Rock Week. Bullet for My Valentine released the track entitled "Temper Temper" on 30 October 2012 worldwide across all digital providers apart from in the UK where it was released on 25 November 2012. On 12 November, a music video for the single "Temper Temper" was released. It was shot in Los Angeles and directed by Michael Dispenza. On 17 December 2012, the next single was released via YouTube named "Riot", and the music video for the song was released on 11 January 2013. The band collaborated with Chris Jericho from Fozzy on the song "Dead to the World", in which Jericho co-wrote the lyrics. The album was leaked on 1 February 2013. Bullet for My Valentine released a music video for "P.O.W." on 24 May 2013, and another video for "Breaking Point" on 7 June 2013. "Breaking Point" was released as a single on 12 August 2013, peaking at number 36 on Mainstream Rock Songs.

== Reception ==
=== Critical ===
Professional ratings
Aggregate scores
Source	Rating
Metacritic	60/100
Review scores
Source	Rating
AllMusic	3/5 stars
Playsound	5/10 stars
BBC	(Negative)
Big Cheese	4/5 stars
Drowned in Sound	6/10 stars
The Guardian	2/5 stars
Metal Hammer	6/10 stars
NME	6/10 stars
Loudwire	4/5 stars
Source Magazine	2/5 stars

The album divided critics and fans alike upon its release. It holds a weighted average score of 60/100 on the review aggregator website Metacritic based on 10 reviews, indicating "mixed or average reviews", while the user's average score is 5.8/10.

Ultimate Guitar lamented that "even the brighter musical moments struggle to get off the ground. It's a real shame." Similarly, Dom Lawson of The Guardian awarded Temper Temper two out of five stars, feeling the album "is marred by cynicism and a lack of dirt under its nails." BBC's Raziq Rauf gave the album a negative review, finishing with "The Welshmen need to improve on Temper Temper come their next long-player, or they risk lasting damage to a previously untouchable reputation."

Chad Childers of Loudwire gave the album a positive review, stating that "Bullet for My Valentine are clicking on all cylinders on their new album." ARTISTdirect gave the album five out of five stars, saying "Temper Temper expertly fuses the quartet's signature tight, technical thrash with the biggest hooks of their career."

=== Commercial ===
Temper Temper peaked at number 13 on the US Billboard 200, selling 41,000 copies the first week. It stayed for nine weeks on the chart. By 2018, it had sold over 340,000 copies in the United States.

"Riot" charted at number 22 on Mainstream Rock Songs. It was featured in the video game NHL 14.

== Track listing ==
All lyrics are written by Matt Tuck, except "Dead to the World", co-written with Chris Jericho; all music is composed by Bullet for My Valentine, except "Breaking Point" and "Tears Don't Fall (Part 2)", co-written with Don Gilmore.

Standard edition
No.	Title	Length
1.	"Breaking Point"	3:42
2.	"Truth Hurts"	3:36
3.	"Temper Temper"	3:08
4.	"P.O.W."	3:53
5.	"Dirty Little Secret"	4:55
6.	"Leech"	3:59
7.	"Dead to the World"	5:15
8.	"Riot"	2:49
9.	"Saints & Sinners"	3:29
10.	"Tears Don't Fall (Part 2)"	5:38
11.	"Livin' Life (On the Edge of a Knife)"	4:01
Total length:		44:25

Japanese bonus track
No.	Title	Length
12.	"Playing with Fire" (track 15 on Japanese deluxe edition)	2:50
Total length:		47:15

Deluxe edition bonus tracks
No.	Title	Writer(s)	Length
12.	"Not Invincible"		3:26
13.	"Whole Lotta Rosie" (AC/DC cover) (from the "Live Lounge" show on BBC Radio 1)	Angus Young, Malcolm Young, Bon Scott	4:10
14.	"Scream Aim Fire" (from the "Live Lounge" show on BBC Radio 1)		5:03
Total length:			57:04

European deluxe edition bonus track
No.	Title	Length
15.	"Your Betrayal" (from the "Live Lounge" show on BBC Radio 1)	5:05
Total length:		62:01

== Personnel ==
Bullet for My Valentine

- Matt Tuck – vocals, rhythm guitar, bass (uncredited)
- Michael "Moose" Thomas – drums
- Michael "Padge" Paget – lead guitar, backing vocals
- Jay James – bass (credited but does not perform), backing vocals

Production

- Don Gilmore – producer
- Chris Lord-Alge – mixing
- Ted Jensen – mastering at Sterling Sound

== Charts ==
Chart (2013)	Peak position
Australian Albums (ARIA)	4
Austrian Albums (Ö3 Austria)	3
Belgian Albums (Ultratop Flanders)	65
Belgian Albums (Ultratop Wallonia)	91
Canadian Albums (Billboard)	9
Czech Albums (ČNS IFPI)	32
French Albums (SNEP)	51
German Albums (Offizielle Top 100)	5
Japanese Albums (Oricon)	17
New Zealand Albums (RMNZ)	14
Norwegian Albums (VG-lista)	30
Finnish Albums (Suomen virallinen lista)	5
Spanish Albums (Promusicae)	85
Swedish Albums (Sverigetopplistan)	19
UK Albums (Official Charts)	11
UK Rock & Metal Albums (Official Charts)	1
US Billboard 200	13
US Top Hard Rock Albums (Billboard)	1
US Top Rock Albums (Billboard)	5
US Indie Store Album Sales (Billboard)	1
