= Bullet for My Valentine =

Welsh heavy metal band

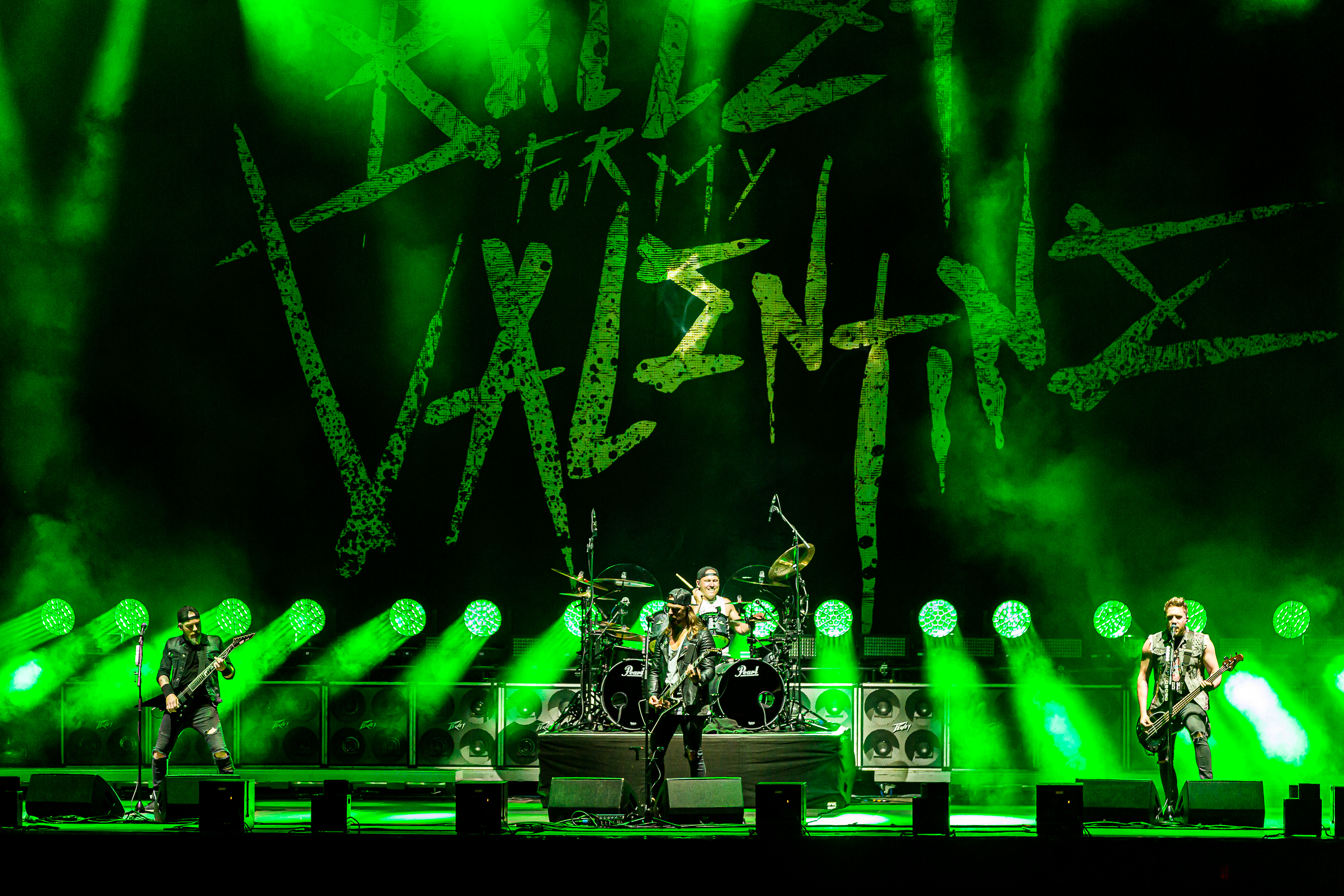
- Bullet for My Valentine performing at Full Force 2022

Background information
- Also known as: Jeff Killed John (1998–2003), Opportunity In Chicago (2004)
- Origin: Bridgend, Wales
- Genres: Melodic metalcore; heavy metal; thrash metal; hard rock
- Years active: 1998–present
- Labels: Trustkill; Visible Noise; GUN; Sony Music; Jive; RCA; Spinefarm
- Members: Matthew Tuck; Michael Paget; Jamie Mathias; Jason Bowld
- Past members: Nick Crandle; Jason James; Michael Thomas
- Website: bulletformyvalentine.com

Bullet for My Valentine, often abbreviated as BFMV, are a Welsh heavy metal band from Bridgend, formed in 1998. The band is currently composed of Matthew Tuck (vocals, rhythm guitar), Michael Paget (lead guitar), Jamie Mathias (bass) and Jason Bowld (drums). Former members include Michael Thomas, Jason James and Nick Crandle; the latter were on bass. They were formed under the name Jeff Killed John and started their music career by covering songs by Metallica and Nirvana. Jeff Killed John recorded six songs which were not released; two of these tracks were reworked later in their career as Bullet for My Valentine. A change of style from that of Jeff Killed John led the band to change their name. In 2002, the band secured a five-album deal with Sony BMG. The band has stated that their music is influenced by classic metal acts such as Metallica, Iron Maiden and Slayer. The band is part of the Cardiff music scene.

Bullet for My Valentine's debut album The Poison was released in October 2005 in the United Kingdom and on 14 February 2006 in the United States to coincide with Valentine's Day, in a nod to the band's name. The album entered the U.S. Billboard 200 at number 128. It was certified gold by the Recording Industry Association of America. The band made appearances at the Download Festival and Kerrang! XXV, and undertook a U.S. tour with Rob Zombie. Bullet for My Valentine's second studio album, Scream Aim Fire, was released in 2008 and debuted at number four on the Billboard 200. The band's third album, Fever, was released in 2010 and debuted at number three on the Billboard 200. In 2013, the band released their fourth studio album, Temper Temper, which peaked at number 13 on the Billboard 200. In 2015, the band released their fifth studio album, Venom, which peaked at number 8 on the Billboard 200. In 2018, the band released their sixth studio album, Gravity. Their self-titled seventh studio album was released in 2021. The band has sold over one million albums in the United States and over 3,000,000 albums worldwide and are the most-successful act in the Kerrang! Awards category of Best British Band with three wins.

== History ==
=== Jeff Killed John and record deal (1998–2005) ===
Jeff Killed John was the forerunner band to Bullet for My Valentine and was formed in 1998 by Matthew Tuck, Michael "Padge" Paget, Nick Crandle, and Michael "Moose" Thomas while studying music at Bridgend College. They started playing Nirvana and Metallica cover songs. In 1999, the band released their first ever EP, Better Off Alone. They released another two-track EP in 2002, You/Play with Me, which was produced by Greg Haver. The EP was financed through the Pynci scheme for new Welsh musicians and the release garnered radio airplay on BBC Radio 1's broadcast at Newport's T.J.'s. Shortly after, the band released another two-track EP titled Eye Spy. In 2003, their second EP was released titled Don't Walk Away. This was a promotional CD and was shipped to different record companies, as well as being given out locally in Bridgend. Bassist Crandle left the band on the eve of entering the recording sessions for the band's self-titled EP and was replaced by Jason James. In late 2003, they released their final EP before record labels actually began to notice their potential. This happened due to the sudden change in their strategy and sound, which the band claims came "directly out of their heads." Their self-titled EP consisted of five songs; most of the songs became precursors of tracks from The Poison. Tuck later recalled the transitionary period: "Everything went completely tits up. It was a really big kick in the balls but it made us stronger. It was so nearly the end of our dream as we were all fed up with constantly banging our heads against a wall, but thankfully we gave it one more shot under a new identity, and it worked." After briefly performing as Opportunity In Chicago, the band changed their name to Bullet for My Valentine in time for a label showcase at the London Barfly on March 28, 2004.

Roadrunner Records showed interest in Bullet for My Valentine and offered the band a deal. The offer was ultimately turned down, and the band signed a five-album record deal with Sony BMG and a UK licensing deal with Visible Noise. According to Tuck, they chose Sony because, "We thought that a lot more doors would be open to us." A self-titled EP was released on 15 November 2004 in the UK. Produced by Colin Richardson, it featured five tracks and marked the band's first official release. A second EP, Hand of Blood, was released on 22 August 2005 through Trustkill Records and was only available in the U.S.; the release contained one extra track than the self-titled EP, "4 Words (To Choke Upon)". Daniel Lukes of Decibel Magazine reviewed the EP by stating, "The worst part is that the music itself isn't all that bad, for the genre." He went on to comment that the band should be "embarrassed" about the release. Zero Magazine's Josh Joyce complimented the band on "how technical they can get without confusing the kids."

=== The Poison (2005–2007) ===
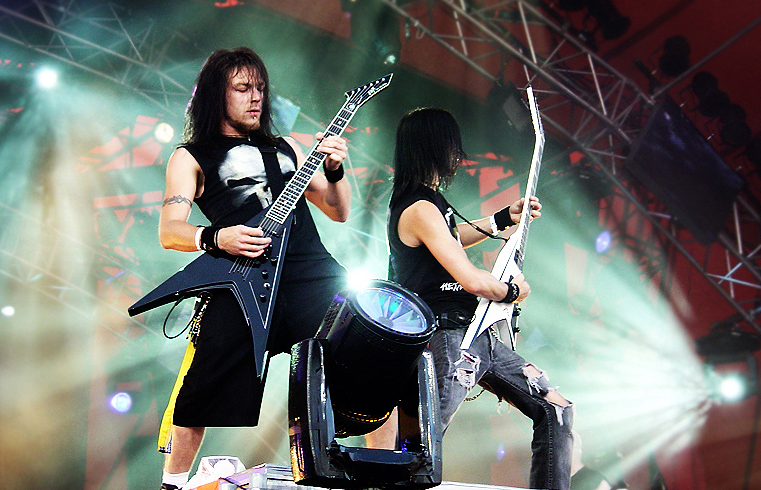
Michael Paget (left) and Matthew Tuck (right) at 2006's Roskilde Festival held in Denmark

Bullet for My Valentine's debut album, The Poison, was released on 3 October 2005 in the UK and on Valentine's Day 2006 in the US. It entered the Billboard 200 at number 128, and attained number 11 on the Independent Albums chart. On 30 January 2009, the album was certified gold by the RIAA after 500,000 copies were sold in the US. Four singles were released from The Poison: "4 Words (To Choke Upon)", "Suffocating Under Words of Sorrow (What Can I Do)", "All These Things I Hate (Revolve Around Me)", and "Tears Don't Fall". Bullet for My Valentine promoted the album by touring across the world. In 2005, with increased popularity, they played on the larger Download Festival Snickers stage; in 2006, the band were moved to near the top of the main stage bill. Other tours included opening for Metallica and Guns N' Roses in the summer of 2006, the Vans Warped Tour and Earthday Birthday.

The band's headline performance at Kerrang XXV, a one-off gig at Brixton Academy in London on 28 January 2006, was filmed for their first DVD, The Poison: Live at Brixton. During June 2007, Tuck suffered from laryngitis, which led to an emergency tonsillectomy in July. Bullet for My Valentine were forced to cancel several shows, including supporting Metallica for three dates on their Sick of the Studio '07 tour on 29 June in Bilbao, 5 July in Vienna, and 8 July at the recently completed Wembley Stadium in London. Unable to speak, Tuck wrote that as soon as doctors cleared him he would be in the studio working on the band's next album.

=== Scream Aim Fire (2007–2008) ===
The band's second studio album, Scream Aim Fire, was recorded at Sonic Ranch Studios and was produced by Colin Richardson. Tuck commented at the time, "It's a lot more up tempo, a lot more aggressive." The album was released on 28 January 2008. It sold 53,000 copies in its first week and peaked at number four on the Billboard 200. Three songs were released as singles: "Scream Aim Fire," "Hearts Burst into Fire," and "Waking the Demon."

In support of the new album, the band toured North America and Australia in the spring of 2008 for the Taste of Chaos tour alongside Atreyu, Blessthefall, and Avenged Sevenfold. Bullet for My Valentine cut short the Canada portion of the tour and flew back home to support the daughter of James who was in hospital. The band performed in North America again in the summer of 2008 as part of the No Fear Tour with Bleeding Through, Cancer Bats and Black Tide. In late 2008, the band toured Europe, supported by Lacuna Coil, Bleeding Through, and Black Tide. In December 2008, Scream Aim Fire was re-released with four bonus tracks that were recorded during the album's studio sessions, but with re-recorded vocal-lines.

=== Fever (2009–2011) ===
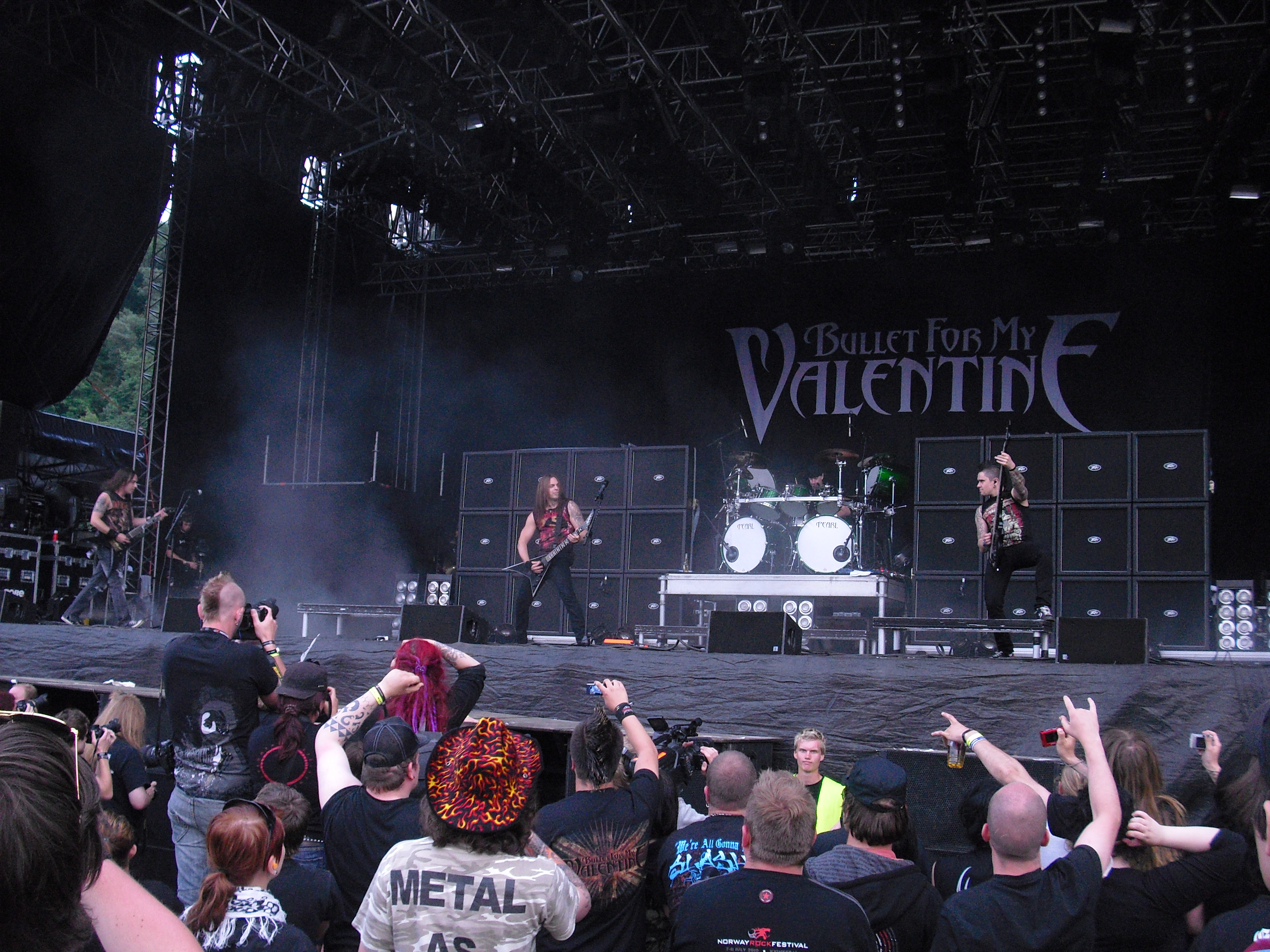
Bullet for My Valentine performing live at Norway Rock Festival 2010

Matt Tuck spoke to Daniel Marez of Metal Hammer in March 2009 about the band's progress on writing and recording their third album. Tuck stated that there were four or five songs that were finished and that "usually we write and record 14 tracks that I then have to write vocal lines for, but this time I'm trying to write the vocals as I write the music." Bullet for My Valentine confirmed in August 2009 that they were aiming for an early 2010 release for the new album, while Tuck stated that the upcoming record is "a lot more mature-sounding, it's a lot more classic. It'll stand the test of time [more] than both the previous things we've done." In a January 2010 interview with Rock Sound, Tuck stated explained details for the album: it would be titled Fever, and the 11-track record would have a sound closer to The Poison rather than Scream Aim Fire and contain no ballads.

During the summer of 2009, Bullet for My Valentine toured across the United States as part of the Mayhem Festival, alongside Killswitch Engage, Slayer and Marilyn Manson on the main stage; they also appeared on the UK leg of the Sonisphere tour at Knebworth, headlining the second stage. The band headlined the second stage at the Download Festival 2010 on the Friday night. The band was also confirmed for Nova Rock, Metaltown, Rock am Ring, Rock on the Range, The Bamboozle, Bilbao Live Festival, Fortarock and Graspop. In addition, Bullet for My Valentine also played alongside the Big Four on the Greek leg of Sonisphere. Fever was released on 27 April 2010. A free download of a new track called "Begging For Mercy" was released on the band's website on 14 February 2010 as part of a Twitter promotion. The song "Your Betrayal" was chosen as the lead single for the album and was released to radio on 8 March 2010. The second single is called "The Last Fight" and was released on 19 April 2010. The album artwork for this studio album was released on the official website on 5 March 2010. Bullet for My Valentine announced the start their US tour in support of Fever. It began on 30 April with the bands Airbourne and Chiodos as support. On 12 March 2010, the band released the music videos for "The Last Fight" and "Your Betrayal." The band revealed the track listing on 15 March 2010. On 26 April the band played a secret show in London to celebrate the release of Fever. This was their only UK headline show until the end of the year. The third single is called "Bittersweet Memories" and was released on 25 November 2010 with a music video.

=== Temper Temper (2012–2013) ===
On 28 January 2011, Michael Paget stated that the group had already drawn proportions for the next studio album and will sound a lot like Fever. He followed-along with stating that the band plans to have the songs for it written within 2011 and will begin recording the album by the end of the year. A couple tracks left from the Fever sessions might be re-done, re-arranged and re-recorded for the new record. The band played at Uproar Festival 2011, after which they began writing material for a fourth studio album.

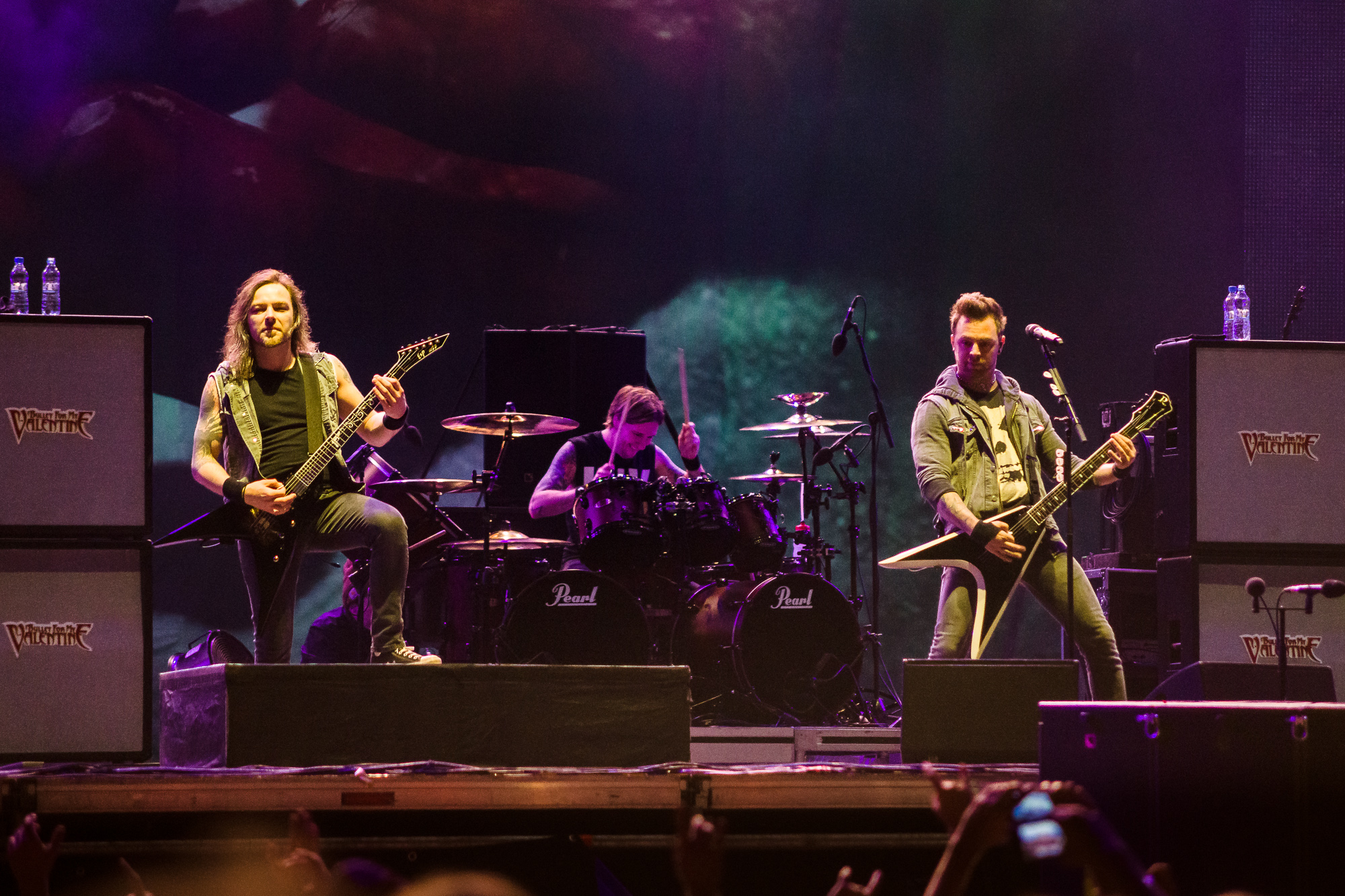
Bullet for My Valentine at Ursynalia 2013 Warsaw Student Festival, Poland

On 7 October 2011, RCA Music Group announced it was disbanding Jive Records along with Arista Records and J Records. With the shutdown, the band (and all other artists previously signed to these three labels) will release their future material (including their next studio album) on the RCA Records brand. Also in October, frontman Matt Tuck announced that he will be working on a new side project which he has described as "metal as fuck", influenced by bands such as Pantera and Slipknot. On 1 May 2012 it was revealed that the project would be called AxeWound, and featured Liam Cormier (Cancer Bats), Mike Kingswood (Glamour of the Kill), Joe Copcutt (Rise to Remain), and Jason Bowld (Pitchshifter). In May 2012, it was announced that Bullet for My Valentine would be playing at the South African music festival Oppikoppi, as well as a once-off gig in Cape Town alongside Seether and Enter Shikari. They were slated to play in the country for the Coke Zero Fest of 2009, but pulled out at the last minute to record Fever. It was confirmed on 6 August 2012 that the final recording session of the band's fourth studio record was complete, and that the album would be out sometime in late 2012. Later that month on the 17th, the second line-up for the Australian music festival Soundwave was announced, containing Bullet for My Valentine.

Paget had back surgery in September 2012. It was not immediately known what ailment he was suffering from. The band posted a picture with a caption that said that he was "doing great."

Bullet for My Valentine released the track "Temper Temper" on 22 October 2012. On 12 November 2012, the band released a music video for the song. The release date was confirmed to be 12 February 2013. The band premiered the song "Temper Temper" at Radio 1 Rocks where they were the headlining act. On 17 December 2012, the second single, "Riot" was released. On 24 May 2013, "P.O.W." was released, the album's third single. On 7 June 2013, "Breaking Point" was released, the album's fourth single.

The band began touring in support of Temper Temper on 10 February 2013, and finished the tour on 3 November 2013. The tenth show of the tour, held at Birmingham's O2 Academy, was filmed by music video website Moshcam.com.

=== Venom (2013–2015) ===
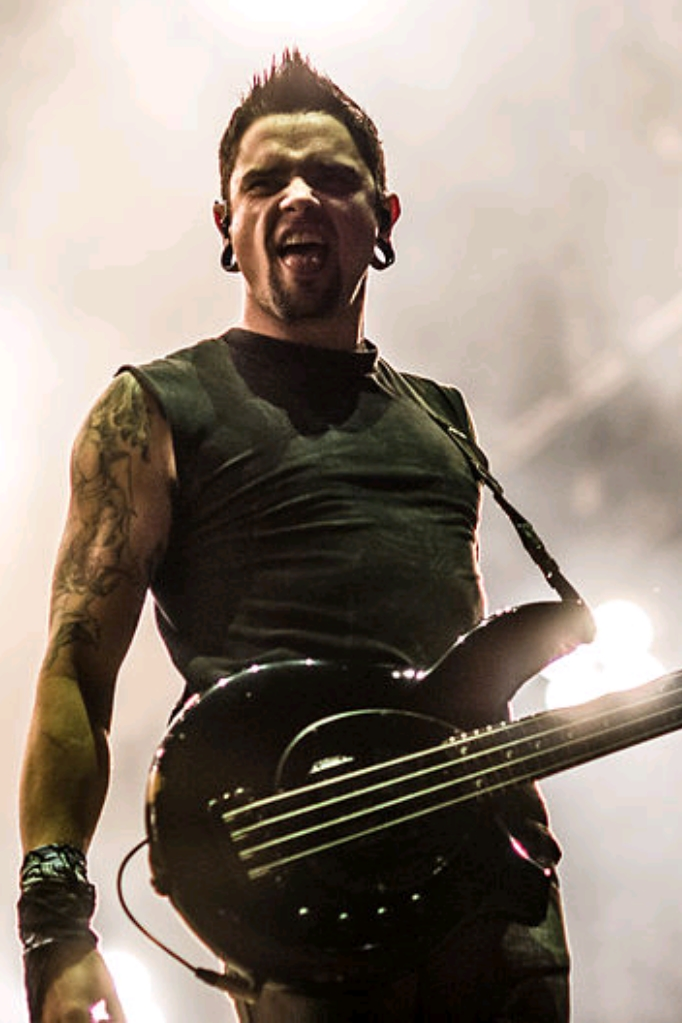
Bassist Jason James, pictured in 2013, left the band shortly before recording sessions took place for Venom.

In an interview, Matt Tuck said that Bullet for My Valentine were going to start work on a new album before the Rule Britannia Tour, which took place between 1 and 6 December 2013 in which the band played arenas in Britain supported by Young Guns and Asking Alexandria. In the interview Matt also said that they were strongly considering working with Terry Date, who has worked with bands such as Pantera and Deftones. He also said the band would bring back the thrash metal elements from Scream Aim Fire.

In November 2013, Bullet for My Valentine revealed though their Facebook page they were working on a new song. A short snippet of the song, titled "Raising Hell," was released on Matt Tuck's Vine profile on the 15th. The song was first played three days later via BBC Radio 1's Rock Show. It was made available for streaming and a music video for the song was released a week later.

In 2014, Matt announced on Twitter that the band were entering the studio to record a fifth album. On 28 August 2014, the band appeared on paranormal television show Most Haunted for an investigation at the Newton House in Llandeilo, Carmarthenshire.

In an interview with Kerrang! on 21 January 2015, Matt revealed that Bullet for My Valentine will be hitting the studio next month with producer Colin Richardson who produced both The Poison and Scream Aim Fire, rather than Terry Date, who was the suggested producer initially. Tuck also said that their fifth album will be their heaviest album yet. On 9 February 2015, Bullet for My Valentine announced the departure of bassist Jason James, adding that they would announce a replacement when they felt "the time was right." They went on to say that until the announcement, they'd be busy and focused on recording their new record.

The band released the song "No Way Out" on 18 May 2015. The band also revealed their fifth studio album to be titled Venom and their new bassist was going to be Jamie Mathias, formerly of metal band Revoker. Venom was set for release on 14 August 2015, the same day an expansive UK tour was announced. It was also revealed that Bullet for My Valentine will headline London's Camden Rocks festival which takes place on 30 May 2015. On 29 June 2015, the band released the third single from the album "You Want a Battle? (Here's a War)". On 16 October 2015, the band released a video for the song, title track. On 8 February 2016, the band released a video for the song, "Worthless".

=== Gravity (2016–2020) ===
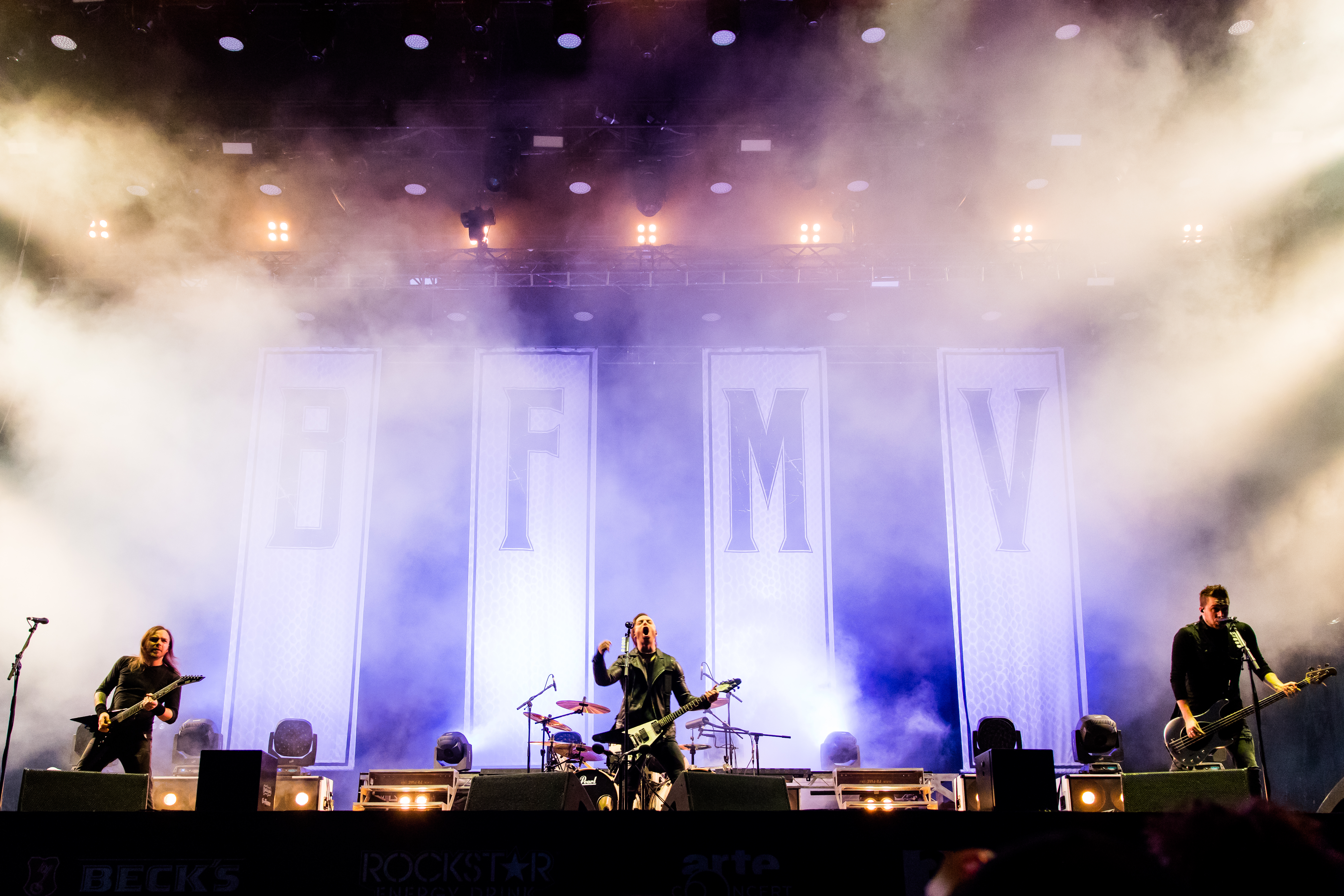
Bullet for My Valentine live at Rock am Ring 2016

In 2016, Bullet for My Valentine announced that drummer Michael Thomas would sit out for a few months to be with his wife as they were expecting their first child. Jason Bowld, former drummer of Pitchshifter and Tuck's bandmate from AxeWound, became Thomas' replacement. In April, they signed a new worldwide deal with Spinefarm Records. Matt Tuck later tweeted "Here we go again. #BFMV6" which implied the band had started working on their sixth effort. Later in the year, the band released a new single titled "Don't Need You". A music video was released with the video as well. At the end of 2017, Michael Thomas was replaced by Jason Bowld full-time.

On 1 April 2018, the band debuted a new song, "Over It", on BBC Radio 1. The song was the first single off their sixth studio album, Gravity, which was confirmed for release on 29 June 2018. On 26 April 2018, the song "Piece of Me" was released. On 18 May 2018, the band released another new song, "Letting You Go", and released a music video for the song on 3 June 2018. On 15 October 2018, the band released a music video for the track "Not Dead Yet".

=== Self-titled seventh album (2020–2023) ===
On 19 May 2020, in an interview with Rock Sound, Tuck announced that the band was in the process of writing a new album. After several mixed-to-negative reviews by critics on Gravity, they decided to working on a new record which would be 'heavier' compared to the latest album. However, the production of the upcoming release, confirmed to be once again produced by Carl Bown, has been delayed due to the COVID-19 pandemic. Tuck commented about the upcoming album: "So it's not ideal, and we did have a lot of plans for the rest of the year for writing and making the record, which are on the backburner now until further notice. [...] It's pretty brutal, to be honest. It couldn't be more of a contrast with Gravity in a ferocious style. It's very technical. [...] The riffs are crushing. There's probably 60 percent aggressive vocals, 40 [percent] clean, which is a ratio we've never really dabbled with before. [...] It's very heavy, it's very technical. For the Bullet fans out there that kind of like that side of this band, it's very cool and very exciting. It feels good."

On 11 June 2021, Bullet for My Valentine unveiled a new Patreon page, The Army of Noise, posting that it is "the only place to get the latest BFMV news, early tix, BTS, merch discounts and exclusive items, signed gifts and more. Plus, a portion of each sub goes to the Teenage Cancer Trust." On 15 June 2021, ahead of their headline slot at this weekend's Download Pilot, the band announced that they are planning to release new music on Friday, 18 June, with a 30-second video teaser hinting at some potentially heavy new music. On that day, the band officially released the new single "Knives" along with its music video. At the same time, they officially announced that their self-titled seventh studio album was set for release on 22 October 2021 while also revealed the album cover and the track list. On 23 July 2021, the band released the second single "Parasite" and its corresponding music video. On 10 September 2021, the band released the third single "Shatter" alongside an accompanying music video. On 20 September 2021, due to the ongoing COVID-19 pandemic and manufacturing delays, the band announced that they pushed back the release of the album to 5 November 2021. On 1 October 2021, one month before the album release, the band released the fourth single "Rainbow Veins". On 8 April 2022, the band released the fifth single "Omen" while also announcing the deluxe edition of the album which is set to be released on 8 July 2022. At the same time, the band officially revealed the album cover and the track list. On 30 April 2022, the band delayed the release of the deluxe edition from 8 July 2022 to 5 August 2022. On 27 May 2022, the group unveiled another single "Stitches". On 29 July 2022, their seventh single, "No More Tears to Cry", was released.

=== The Poison 20th anniversary tour and Social Apocalypse (2024–present) ===
In celebration of the 20th anniversary of The Poison, the band released a 20th anniversary edition of the album and announced 'The Poisoned Ascendancy' Tour with Trivium co-headlining for 2025, with Trivium celebrating the 20th anniversary of Ascendancy. Bullet for My Valentine also announced that they are in the studio to record their eighth studio album, with hopes to get the album out by 2025. The band pulled out of The Poisoned Ascendancy tour in May 2025, finishing the North American leg, despite initial plans to continue into regions such as South America and Australia into the end of 2025, with Trivium bassist Paolo Gregoletto putting the blame on Matt Tuck.

Bullet for My Valentine released a statement expressing that they decided to focus on the "next chapter", heading back to the studio in the summer to finish their upcoming album and planning to tour in 2026 and 2027, "hitting every corner". In July 2025, the band announced a three-day Australian tour in October for The Poison's anniversary, headlining alone.

The band's eighth studio album was originally set for release in January 2027, but it was later announced on 24 September 2026 that the album, titled Social Apocalypse, will be released on 19 March 2027. On the same day as the announcement, the album's titular lead single was released.

== Artistry ==
=== Musical style and classification ===
Bullet for My Valentine has been described as metalcore, heavy metal, melodic metalcore, thrash metal, hard rock, emo, screamo, and post-hardcore. According to Loudwire, other terms used to classify the band have included "myspace-core" and "scene-core" due to the band's popularity with what the publication described as "the scene kids of Myspace", despite their stylistic dissimilarities with other acts associated with these terms. Alternative Press stated that the band had a substantial role in metalcore achieving mainstream attention in the 2000s. Frontman Matt Tuck personally stated that he considered them to be "a hard rock band with metal influences" and that he has "said that from day one." Despite this, when Tuck was later asked in 2010 if he defines Bullet for My Valentine as a heavy metal band or a hard rock band, he said: "I dunno. I could say both, to be honest." Tuck later stated in 2018 that he prefers people call Bullet for My Valentine a heavy metal band instead of categorizing the band under specific subgenres. In 2025 he stated that he did not view metalcore as a "dirty word at all", and stated the opinion that it was an accurate umbrella term for the style they played early in their career. He said: "I love metalcore." He also told Exclaim! that he believed the band was only classified as emo because of its name, and said he considers Bullet for My Valentine to be a "melodic metal" band, saying: "People need to give the music a fair listen musically before they decide to judge it." When asked of their views on their image, members of the band have stated that they would not change their sound or image for a commercial approach; Tuck strongly emphasized that music was foremost. He also told BBC in 2008: "The songs will speak for themselves. So many other bands would rather look good and sound bad, but it's totally the opposite with us. It's all about the music and the riffs. Enough said."

Jeff Treppel of MetalSucks described the band's first two albums as "solid examples of poppy metalcore." The band themselves have self-described their early releases as having a "super dark" tone. According to Decibel, Bullet for My Valentine's lead guitar parts draw influence from heavy metal and their vocals draw from post-hardcore. According to AllMusic, Bullet for My Valentine blend "muscular riffs and emo harmonies" and also draw influence from 1980s metal and punk metal "to make melodic, metallic, dark rock songs." Kirk Miller of Decibel stated that the band's tracks usually employ straightforward song structures. In an interview with Robert Gray from Ultimate-Guitar in 2010, Tuck said that when making the album Scream Aim Fire, Bullet for My Valentine were bothered by critics and journalists who criticized the band and said the band aren't "real metal". Tuck said that the band tried to please people like critics and journalists with Scream Aim Fire. Tuck also said about Scream Aim Fire: "Some of it was written a hundred percent for us, but we tried a little bit too hard to be metal when we should've just carried on doing what we did really - like we did on all of The Poison material." The band abandoned metalcore and thrash metal and "fully surrendered to the call of dad rock" with the release of Fever in 2010, according to Loudwire. During this time, the band began to incorporate radio-friendly hooks and a stronger emphasis on groove while retaining signature elements such as breakdowns. Tuck said: "Scream Aim Fire was an album we wrote to try to prove people wrong, and wasn't an album we made for ourselves. Fever is an album that was a hundred percent us; we didn't listen to anyone's opinions, what critics' opinions were, or what people thought we should do, or how we should sound." Later releases would incorporate elements of nu metal before the band ultimately returned to writing and recording metalcore in 2021 with their self-titled album.

=== Influences ===
Bullet for My Valentine's influences include Trivium, Alice in Chains, Korn, Killswitch Engage, Judas Priest, Def Leppard, Mötley Crüe, Pantera, Iron Maiden, Metallica, Testament, Stuck Mojo, Megadeth, Slayer, Machine Head, Sepultura, Nirvana, Guns N' Roses, Queen, Led Zeppelin, and Dire Straits. According to former drummer Michael Thomas, these are the bands that inspire Bullet for My Valentine's "catchy vocals, aggressive riffs and melodies," Matt Tuck has stated in an interview that his songwriting is highly influenced by Bruce Springsteen, Bob Seger and Bob Dylan, stating that "these bands just are proper old school songwriters." Tuck stated that the band members were introduced to these artists by their parents. He also stated that the band drew influence from more modern styles such as grunge and nu metal. According to him: "It was a timing thing. We were all at a very young age when Nirvana came around. It was an interesting thing to watch. We all wanted to be like Kurt. I had the long hair and ripped up cardigans. It was a good time." Guitarist Michael Paget stated that the first guitar riff he learned to play was "Enter Sandman" by Metallica, and the first full song he learned to play was "Polly" by Nirvana. He said: "I was just playing riffs for a long, long time. As you progress, you start learning more techniques and looking into scale patterns and modes and stuff like that." Before they were known as Bullet for My Valentine, Jeff Killed John's music followed the nu metal trend set by bands such as Korn and Limp Bizkit. The band then changed their name to Bullet for My Valentine and reworked their musical strategy; they decided to play heavy metal songs with "harmony guitars and big angelic choruses," according to Matthew Tuck.

=== Lyrical themes ===
The band's songs and lyrics are usually fictional stories, according to Tuck. The band's lyrics have explored themes and topics including revenge and war, interpersonal relationships, concert tours and the music industry.

== Other projects ==
Guitarist Michael Paget has done guitar lesson videos for Guitar World, where he gives tutorials on playing select Bullet for My Valentine tracks.

Matt Tuck also performs in British-Canadian metal act AxeWound.

== Band members ==
Bullet for My Valentine live at Rock am Ring 2022

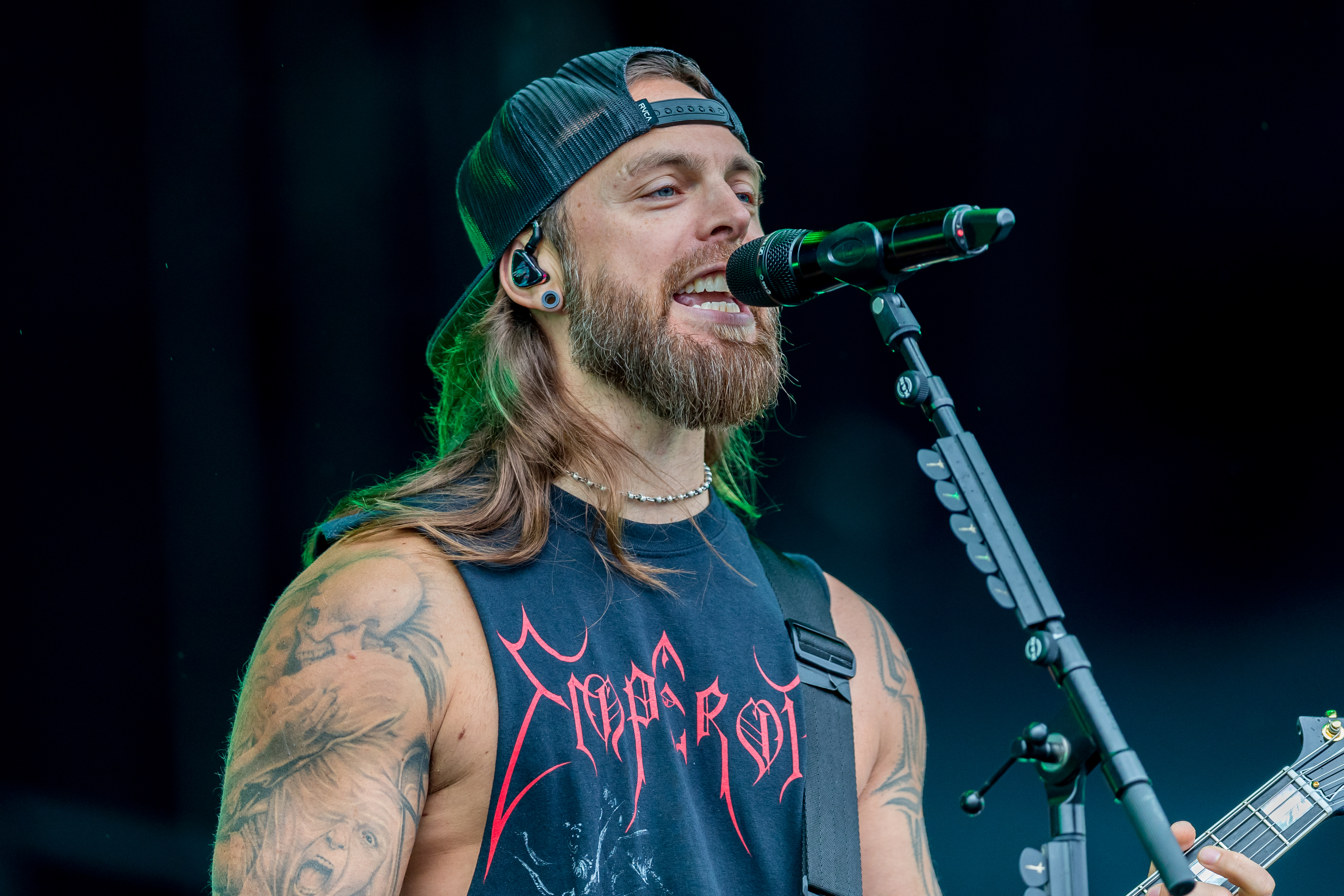
Matthew Tuck

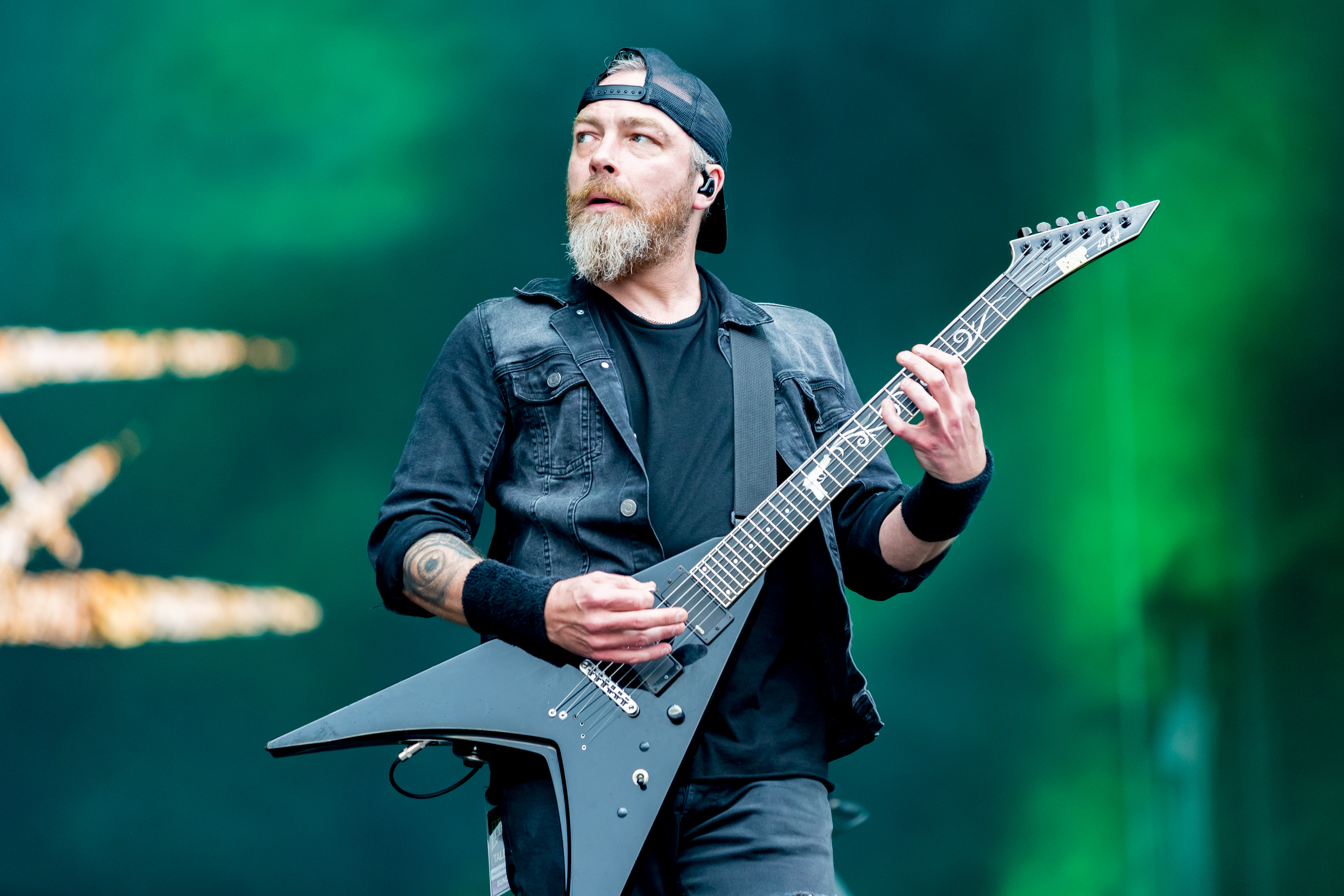
Michael Paget

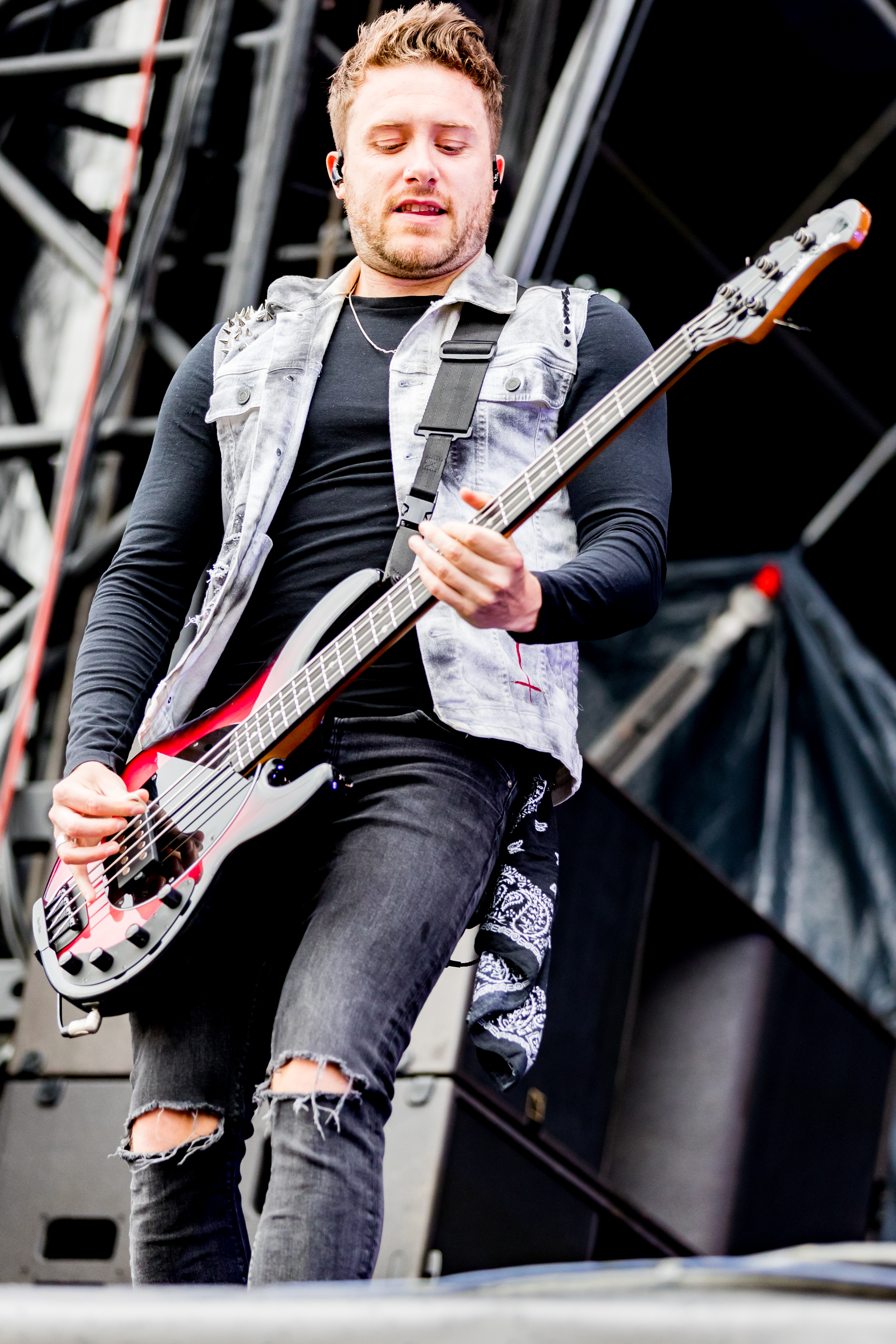
Jamie Mathias

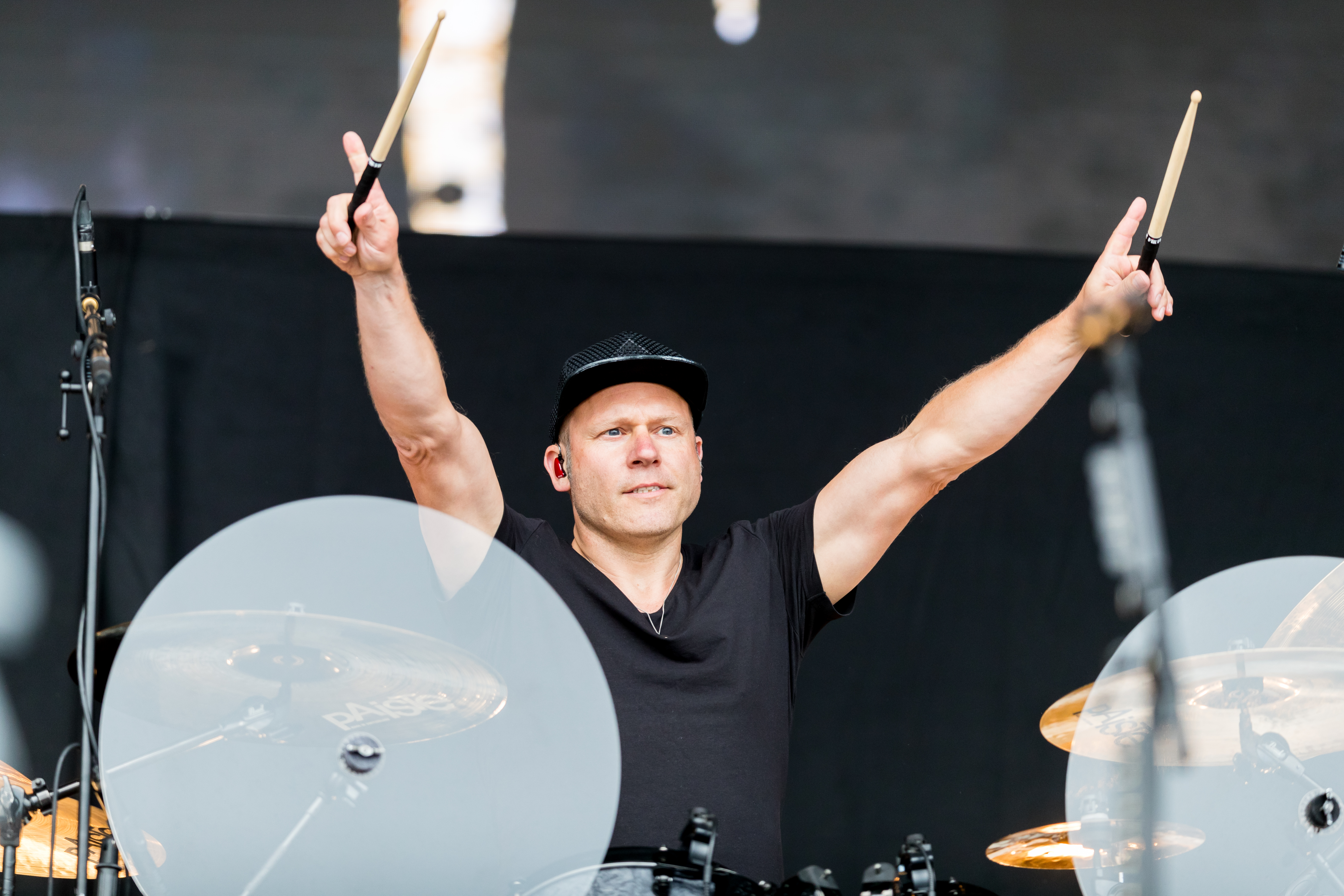
Jason Bowld

Current members

- Matthew "Matt" Tuck – lead vocals, rhythm guitar (1998–present); studio bass (2003–2015)
- Michael "Padge" Paget – lead guitar, backing vocals (1998–present)
- Jamie Mathias – bass, backing vocals (2015–present)
- Jason Bowld – drums, percussion (2017–present; touring member 2016–2017)

Former members

- Nick Crandle – bass (1998–2003)
- Jason "Jay" James – bass, backing vocals (2003–2015)
- Michael "Moose" Thomas – drums, percussion (1998–2016)

Timeline

== Discography ==
Studio albums

- The Poison (2005)
- Scream Aim Fire (2008)
- Fever (2010)
- Temper Temper (2013)
- Venom (2015)
- Gravity (2018)
- Bullet for My Valentine (2021)
- Social Apocalypse (2027)

== Awards and nominations ==
=== Kerrang! Awards ===
Year	Nominee / work	Award	Result	Ref.
2005	"Bullet for My Valentine"	Best British Newcomer	Won	
2006	"Tears Don't Fall"	Best Single	Won	
2006	"Bullet for My Valentine"	Best British Band	Nominated	
2006	"Bullet for My Valentine"	Best Live Band	Nominated	
2006	The Poison	Best Album	Nominated	
2008	"Bullet for My Valentine"	Best British Band	Won	
2008	"Waking the Demon"	Best Single	Nominated	
2008	"Waking the Demon"	Best Video	Nominated	
2008	Scream Aim Fire	Best Album	Nominated	
2009	"Bullet for My Valentine"	Best British Band	Won	
2010	"Bullet for My Valentine"	Best British Band	Won	
2010	"Bullet for My Valentine"	Best Live Band	Won	
2010	Fever	Best Album	Nominated	
2011	"Your Betrayal"	Best Single	Nominated	
2011	Fever	Best British Album	Nominated	
2011	"Bullet for My Valentine"	Best Live	Nominated	
2011	"Bullet for My Valentine"	Best British Band	Nominated	
2012	"Bullet for My Valentine"	Best British Band	Nominated	
2013	"Bullet for My Valentine"	Best Live Band	Nominated	

=== Metal Hammer Golden Gods Awards ===
Year	Nominee / work	Award	Result	Ref.
2006	"Bullet for My Valentine"	Best UK Band	Won	
2010	"Bullet for My Valentine"	Best UK Band	Won	
2013	"Bullet for My Valentine"	Best UK Band	Nominated	

=== Welsh Music Awards ===
Year	Nominee / work	Award	Result	Ref.
2004	"Bullet for My Valentine"	Best Newcomer	Won	
