= The Poison =

2005 studio album by Bullet for My Valentine

Studio album by Bullet for My Valentine
- Released: 3 October 2005
- Recorded: October 2004–February 2005
- Studios: Chapel Studios, Lincolnshire; Nott in Pill Studios, Newport
- Genre: Melodic metalcore
- Length: 53:26
- Labels: Visible Noise; Trustkill; Sony BMG
- Producer: Colin Richardson

Bullet for My Valentine chronology
Hand of Blood (2005)	The Poison (2005)	Scream Aim Fire (2008)

Singles from The Poison
- 1. "4 Words (To Choke Upon)" Released: 28 March 2005; 2. "Suffocating Under Words of Sorrow (What Can I Do)" Released: 19 September 2005; 3. "All These Things I Hate (Revolve Around Me)" Released: 3 February 2006; 4. "Tears Don't Fall" Released: 17 June 2006

The Poison is the debut studio album by Welsh metalcore band Bullet for My Valentine. The album was released on 3 October 2005 through Visible Noise Records in UK, and on 14 February 2006 in United States through Trustkill Records. The album included 11 new songs and two previously heard songs, "Cries in Vain", which was previously heard from the band's self-titled UK EP and from their US EP, Hand of Blood, as well as from "4 Words (To Choke Upon)" was previously included on the same US release. Different editions of the album contain the song "Hand of Blood", previously heard from these EPs, replacing "Spit You Out".

The band played the album in its entirety for the first time in 2016. For the 20th anniversary of the album, the band released a 20th anniversary edition of the album and announced 'The Poisoned Ascendancy' Tour with Trivium that took place in 2025 with Trivium celebrating the 20th anniversary of their successful album Ascendancy.

== Background and recording ==
The band drank wine while writing and recording the album. Singer Matt Tuck claims he passed out while tracking vocals for "Tears Don't Fall".

== Music and lyrics ==
The Poison makes extensive use of clean vocals, and contains elements of emo and post-hardcore. The album employs shred guitar, Gothenburg-style guitar riffs, and breakdowns. AllMusic compared the sound on The Poison to the likes of Atreyu, Funeral for a Friend and Alexisonfire, stating that the band utilize "the glossy, melodic metal-meets-emo aesthetic, utilizing darkly romanticized lyrics that are smoothly sung and growled side-by-side". Raziq Rauf of Drowned in Sound also compared the album's sound to the early work of Atreyu. The album has also drawn comparisons to My Chemical Romance and Unearth. Loudwire said: "The Poison is the connective tissue between the worlds of Ozzfest and Warped Tour, a record that can perfectly appeal to goers of both scenes." Loudwire said the album "skillfully combined bleeding-heart emo, bludgeoning breakdowns and melodic, chest-beating classic metal."

The band described the album's intro track as "this big, movie-style dark heavy metal intro with orchestration." Most tracks employ dual guitar leads and some tracks incorporate the tapping technique.

Ultimate Guitar said the album was "lyrically and aesthetically over the top and dramatic." Singer Matt Tuck has said that many of the album's lyrics are fictional, and that they "were basically stories we created that could match the soundtrack we were creating, so there’s no specific topic." Lyrical themes explored on the album include betrayal, deception, infidelity, long-distance relationships and suicide.

== Commercial performance ==
The album debuted at number 128 on the Billboard 200 and number 2 on the Heatseekers Chart, and as of 30 January 2018, the album has sold 1,600,000 copies worldwide and 500,000 copies in the US. It is the band's most commercially successful effort internationally, earning a gold certification by both the RIAA in the United States and the band's native BPI in the United Kingdom, and a platinum certification by Bundesverband Musikindustrie (BVMI) in Germany.

== Reception and legacy ==
Professional ratings
Review scores
Source	Rating
AllMusic	3/5 stars
Big Cheese	5/5 stars
Drowned in Sound	9/10
Kerrang!	4/5 stars
Metal Hammer	8/10 stars
Q	4/5 stars
Total Guitar	5/5 stars
PunkNews.org	1.5/5 stars
Blabbermouth	6/10
Ultimate Guitar Archive	(9.1/10)
Sputnikmusic	3.5/5 stars

Initial critical reception to The Poison was mixed. Corey Apar of AllMusic awarded the album 3 stars out of 5, commenting that the album showed a "melodic metal-meets-emo aesthetic" peppered with "powerful riffs and classic metal". Sputnikmusic gave the album a 3.5 out of 5, saying the group offers "differing levels of hope for the metalcore genre." Music Emissions complimented the album's guitar work and hooks, but believed only fans of the metalcore genre would enjoy the album.

Stylus Magazine gave the album a C− (below average) and said that The Poison album appeared to be "made for provincial 15-year-olds to get violent with each other", citing "The Poison" and "Suffocating Under Words of Sorrow (What Can I Do)" as the album's strongest songs. Punknews.org wrote that the album was "drab", criticizing the album's pace, vocal delivery, and dynamics.

In 2023, Metal Hammer listed the album as among the greatest heavy metal albums of the 2000s. They wrote that "the intoxicating mix of raw emotion, sweeping riffs and undeniable hooks made Bullet feel like champions from the off, the defiant roar of 'Her Voice Resides' signalling that the US’s dominance of metalcore wouldn’t go as uncontested as it had for nu metal."

It was cited as the band's best album by Bryan Rolli of Loudwire in 2025. A year earlier while writing for the same publication, music journalist John Hill called it the best metalcore album of 2005.

== Track listing ==
All lyrics are written by Matthew Tuck; all music is composed by Bullet for My Valentine.

No.	Title	Length
1.	"Intro" (featuring Apocalyptica)	2:22
2.	"Her Voice Resides"	4:17
3.	"4 Words (To Choke Upon)"	3:43
4.	"Tears Don't Fall"	5:48
5.	"Suffocating Under Words of Sorrow (What Can I Do)"	3:35
6.	"Hit the Floor"	3:30
7.	"All These Things I Hate (Revolve Around Me)"	3:45
8.	"Room 409"	4:01
9.	"The Poison"	3:39
10.	"10 Years Today"	3:55
11.	"Cries in Vain"	3:56
12.	"Spit You Out"	4:07
13.	"The End"	6:48
Total length:		53:26

Limited digipack edition (alternate track listing)
No.	Title	Length
1.	"Intro" (featuring Apocalyptica)	2:22
2.	"Her Voice Resides"	4:17
3.	"4 Words (To Choke Upon)"	3:43
4.	"Tears Don't Fall"	5:48
5.	"Suffocating Under Words of Sorrow (What Can I Do)"	3:35
6.	"Hit the Floor"	3:30
7.	"All These Things I Hate (Revolve Around Me)"	3:45
8.	"Hand of Blood"	3:35
9.	"Room 409"	4:01
10.	"The Poison"	3:39
11.	"10 Years Today"	3:55
12.	"Cries in Vain"	3:56
13.	"Spit You Out"	4:07
14.	"The End"	6:48
Total length:		57:01

Limited digipack edition enhanced material
No.	Title	Length
1.	"Hand of Blood" (music video)	3:34
2.	"4 Words (To Choke Upon)" (music video)	3:51
3.	"Behind the scene" (video)
4.	"Wallpaper"

Japanese bonus tracks
No.	Title	Length
14.	"Room 409" (live)	4:00
15.	"Spit You Out" (live)	4:03
Total length:		61:31

UK deluxe edition bonus tracks
No.	Title	Length
14.	"7 Days"	3:24
15.	"My Fist, Your Mouth, Her Scars"	3:52
16.	"Spit You Out" (live at the Brixton Academy)	4:16
17.	"All These Things I Hate (Revolve Around Me)" (live at the Brixton Academy)	4:03
Total length:		68:33

UK deluxe edition bonus DVD
No.	Title	Length
1.	"Hand of Blood" (music video)	3:34
2.	"4 Words (To Choke Upon)" (music video)	3:51
3.	"Suffocating Under Words of Sorrow (What Can I Do)" (music video)	3:26
4.	"4 Words (To Choke Upon)" (live at Club Quattro, Shibuya, Tokyo)	3:47
5.	"Suffocating Under Words of Sorrow (What Can I Do)" (live at Club Quattro, Shibuya, Tokyo)	3:41
6.	"Cries in Vain" (live at Club Quattro, Shibuya, Tokyo)	4:17
Total length:		22:36

US deluxe edition bonus tracks
No.	Title	Length
14.	"7 Days"	3:24
15.	"My Fist, Your Mouth, Her Scars"	3:52
16.	"Welcome Home (Sanitarium)" (Metallica cover)	6:13
17.	"Tears Don't Fall" (acoustic version)	4:37
Total length:		71:34

US deluxe edition bonus DVD
No.	Title	Length
1.	"4 Words (To Choke Upon)" (live at Club Quattro, Shibuya, Tokyo)	3:47
2.	"Suffocating Under Words of Sorrow (What Can I Do)" (live at Club Quattro, Shibuya, Tokyo)	3:41
3.	"Cries in Vain" (live at Club Quattro, Shibuya, Tokyo)	4:17
4.	"All These Things I Hate (Revolve Around Me)" (live at Brixton Academy, London, England)	3:53
5.	"Her Voice Resides" (live at Brixton Academy, London, England)	4:26
6.	"Hand of Blood" (music video)	3:34
7.	"4 Words (To Choke Upon)" (music video)	3:51
8.	"Tears Don't Fall" (music video)	4:40
9.	"All These Things I Hate (Revolve Around Me)" (music video)	3:58
Total length:		36:06

== Personnel ==
Bullet for My Valentine

- Matthew Tuck – lead vocals, guitar, bass (uncredited)
- Michael "Moose" Thomas – drums
- Michael "Padge" Paget – guitar, backing vocals
- Jay James – bass (credited but did not perform), vocals

Additional musicians

- Eicca Toppinen – arrangement (on "Intro")
- Apocalyptica – cellos (on "Intro")

Production details

- All lyrics by Matthew Tuck
- All music by Bullet for My Valentine
  - Except "Intro" cellos by Apocalyptica, arrangement by Eicca Toppinen
  - Except "Welcome Home (Sanitarium)" by Metallica
- Published by Harmageddon Publishing Ltd / Universal Music Publishing SAS
- All tracks produced & mixed by Colin Richardson
  - Except "Hit the Floor" produced & mixed by Colin Richardson & Andy Sneap
- All tracks mixed at The Chapel, Lincolnshire
  - Except "4 Words (To Choke Upon)" mixed at The Sonic Ranch, El Paso, Texas
  - Except "Hit the Floor" mixed at Backstage Studios, Derbyshire
- Engineered by Dan Turner
- Engineering assistance by Will Bartle, Matt Hyde & Justin Leigh
- Recorded at The Chapel (Lincolnshire), Backstage Studios (Derbyshire), Notting Pill Studios (Newport) & SUSI Studios (Finland)
- A&R – Martin Dodd
- A&R UK – Julie Weir
- Worldwide management – Paul Craig at Supervision Management Ltd
- Agent – Paul Ryan at The Agency Group (excluding US)
- Artwork by S2 at laboca.co.uk
- Video footage filmed and edited by Dan Fernbach at Static Films
- Band photographs by Patrick Ford

== Charts ==
=== Album ===
Chart (2005–2013)	Peak position
Austrian Albums (Ö3 Austria)	43
German Albums (Offizielle Top 100)	25
Japanese Albums (Oricon)	37
Scottish Albums (Official Charts)	25
UK Albums (Official Charts)	21
UK Rock & Metal Albums (Official Charts)	1
UK Independent Albums (Official Charts)	3
US Billboard 200	128
US Heatseekers Albums (Billboard)	2
US Independent Albums (Billboard)	9

Chart (2024)	Peak position
German Albums (Offizielle Top 100)	44
UK Albums (Official Charts)	66
Scottish Albums (OCC)	19
UK Rock & Metal Albums (OCC)	2

== Certifications ==
Region	Certification	Certified units/sales
Germany (BVMI)	Platinum	200,000^{‡}
United Kingdom (BPI)	Gold	100,000^{^}
United States (RIAA)	Gold	500,000^{^}
^{^} Shipments figures based on certification alone.^{‡} Sales+streaming figures based on certification alone.
