= Visible Noise =

- Founded: 1998
- Founder: Julie Weir
- Defunct: 2016
- Genre: Rock; heavy metal; nu metal; hardcore punk
- Country of origin: United Kingdom
- Official website: www.visiblenoise.com

Visible Noise is a defunct British independent record label that focuses exclusively on British bands. They are best known for the rock bands Lostprophets, Bullet for My Valentine, and Bring Me the Horizon.

== History ==
Visible Noise, founded in 1998 by Julie Weir with the aim of promoting new British rock music and bringing it to the cultural zeitgeist, the label emerged as a significant player in the UK rock and heavy metal music scene, primarily focusing on promoting British bands. The label's inception was a strategic move to counter the dominant attention that American bands were receiving at the time, with a goal to bring UK rock music to the forefront. Visible Noise quickly became synonymous with the promotion of UK rock music, notably elevating bands like Bring Me the Horizon, Bullet for My Valentine, and Lostprophets to mainstream success. This effort significantly contributed to putting UK rock music on the map and indicated the label's dedication to discovering and nurturing new talent.

The label's roster included a variety of bands. Notably, Bring Me the Horizon signed with Visible Noise in 2005, releasing their debut album "Count Your Blessings" in 2006, which played a pivotal role in their rise to prominence in the UK rock music scene. Bullet for My Valentine, a Welsh heavy metal band, also found success after signing with Visible Noise in 2004. Lostprophets, another Welsh alternative rock band, had a significant stint with the label, starting in 1999, until their disbandment in 2013. Visible Noise was responsible for releasing several successful albums for these bands, which greatly contributed to their growth and popularity.

As of 2023, there are indications that Visible Noise has been inactive since 2017. The label's official website and social media pages, such as Facebook, appear to be offline, and there have been no recent updates on its YouTube channel or announcements of new music releases. This inactivity marks a pause in the label's operations, which had previously been instrumental in the growth and success of several UK rock bands. Label founder Julie Weir is now the label director of Music for Nations.

As of September 2024, the company is still listed as active and registered with Companies House in the UK. However, during an interview with UPRAWR Podcast in 2024, label founder Julie Weir stated that the label had ceased operations in 2016 due to financial problems partially stemming from the charges against Lostprophets vocalist Ian Watkins.

== Bands ==
The following is a list of bands that were signed to the Visible Noise label during the period in which it was active:

- Ancient Ceremony
- Blitz Kids
- Brides
- Bring Me the Horizon
- Bullet for My Valentine
- Burn Down Rome
- Colt 45
- Cry for Silence
- Days of Worth
- The Dead Formats
- Devil Sold His Soul
- Fireapple Red
- Goatsblood
- Kilkus
- Kill II This
- Labrat
- The Legacy
- Lostprophets
- Miss Conduct
- Number One Son
- Oceans & Anchors
- Opiate
- Outcry Collective
- The Plight
- Primary Slave
- The Stupids
- Your Demise

== See also ==
- List of record labels
- List of independent UK record labels
