= Matthew Tuck =

Welsh singer and guitarist

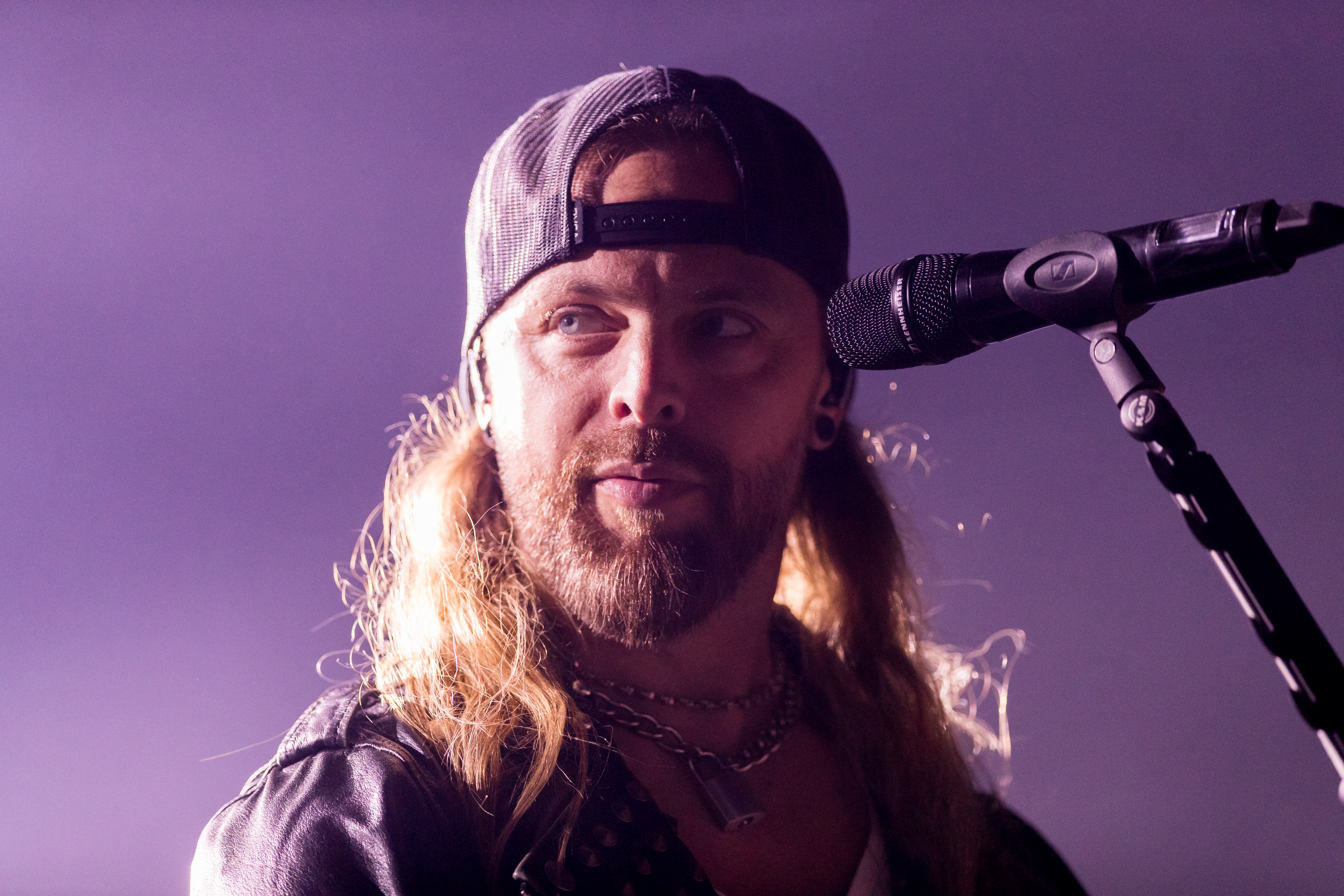
- Tuck performing at Alpen Flair in 2023

Background information
- Born: 20 January 1980 (age 46); Bridgend, Wales
- Genres: Melodic metalcore; heavy metal; thrash metal; groove metal; alternative metal
- Occupations: Singer; musician; songwriter
- Instruments: Vocals; guitar
- Years active: 1998–present
- Member of: Bullet for My Valentine
- Formerly of: AxeWound

Matthew Tuck (born 20 January 1980) is a Welsh musician, best known as the lead vocalist and rhythm guitarist of the heavy metal band Bullet for My Valentine. He is also a guitarist and singer in the supergroup AxeWound, which was formed in 2012.

== Career ==
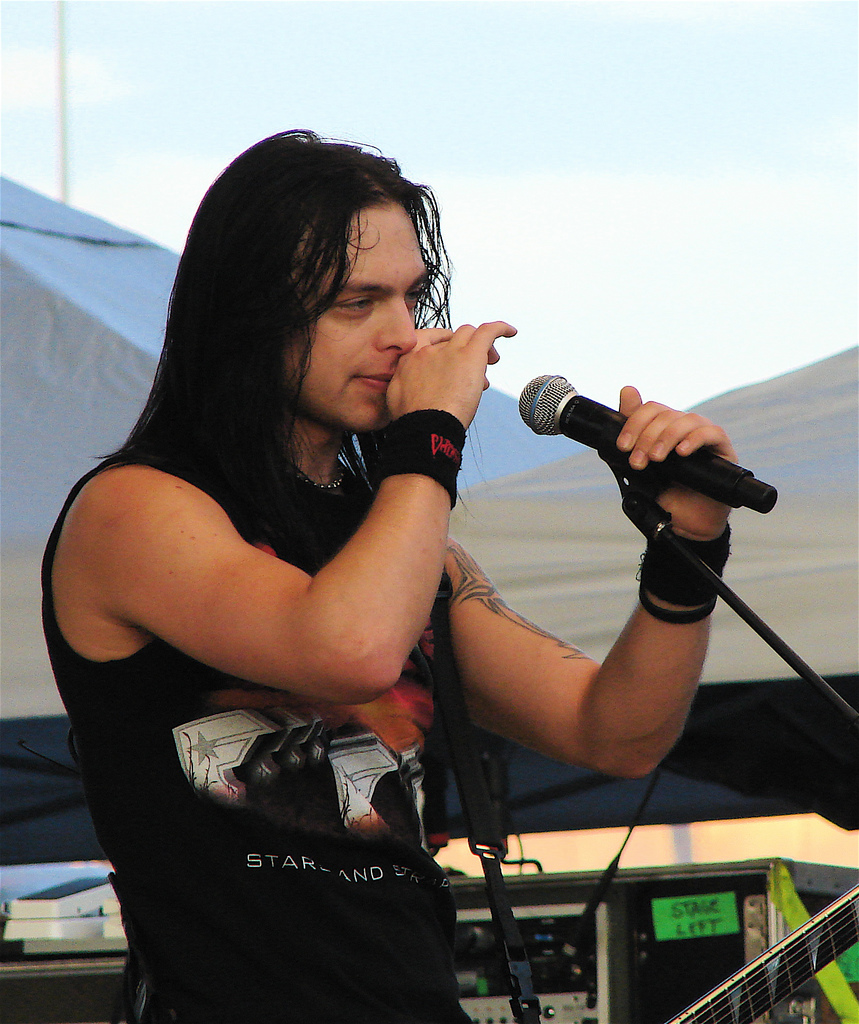
Tuck with Bullet for My Valentine in 2008

Bullet for My Valentine formed in 1998 under the name Jeff Killed John and were originally a nu metal band. After bassist Nick Crandle left in 2003, they picked up Jason James as their new bassist and renamed the band Bullet for My Valentine. They have released seven studio albums and four EPs.

Tuck is also the backing vocalist and rhythm guitarist in the supergroup AxeWound.

On 22 June 2007 it was announced that he needed a tonsillectomy. The band was forced to cancel all of their shows, including their tour as a support band for Metallica. Unable to speak, Tuck wrote that as soon as doctors cleared him he would be in the studio working on the band's next album.

== Influences ==
Tuck's earliest influences included the music his father listened to, such as Status Quo and Bruce Springsteen.

Later he was influenced by Metallica, Nirvana, Pantera, Slayer, Machine Head, Iron Maiden, Mötley Crüe, Def Leppard, Limp Bizkit and Jimmy Eat World.

His biggest influence growing up was Metallica, with their eponymous Black Album being the first record he ever bought after he heard the song "Enter Sandman" for the first time. They were the main reason why he would start to play the guitar, learning the riffs by ear.

== Personal life ==
Tuck married Charlotte Beedell on 7 September 2013 in London. The couple filed for divorce in early 2016 but later reconciled.

== Discography ==
=== Bullet for My Valentine ===
==== Studio albums ====
- The Poison (2005)
- Scream Aim Fire (2008)
- Fever (2010)
- Temper Temper (2013)
- Venom (2015)
- Gravity (2018)
- Bullet for My Valentine (2021)
- Social Apocalypse (2027)

==== EPs ====
- Better Off Alone (1999)
- Don't Walk Away (2003)
- Jeff Killed John (2003)
- Bullet for My Valentine (2004)
- Hand of Blood (2005)
- Rare Cuts (2007)
- Road to Nowhere (2008)

=== AxeWound ===
- Vultures (2012)
