= The Linda Lindas discography =

Music by the American rock band

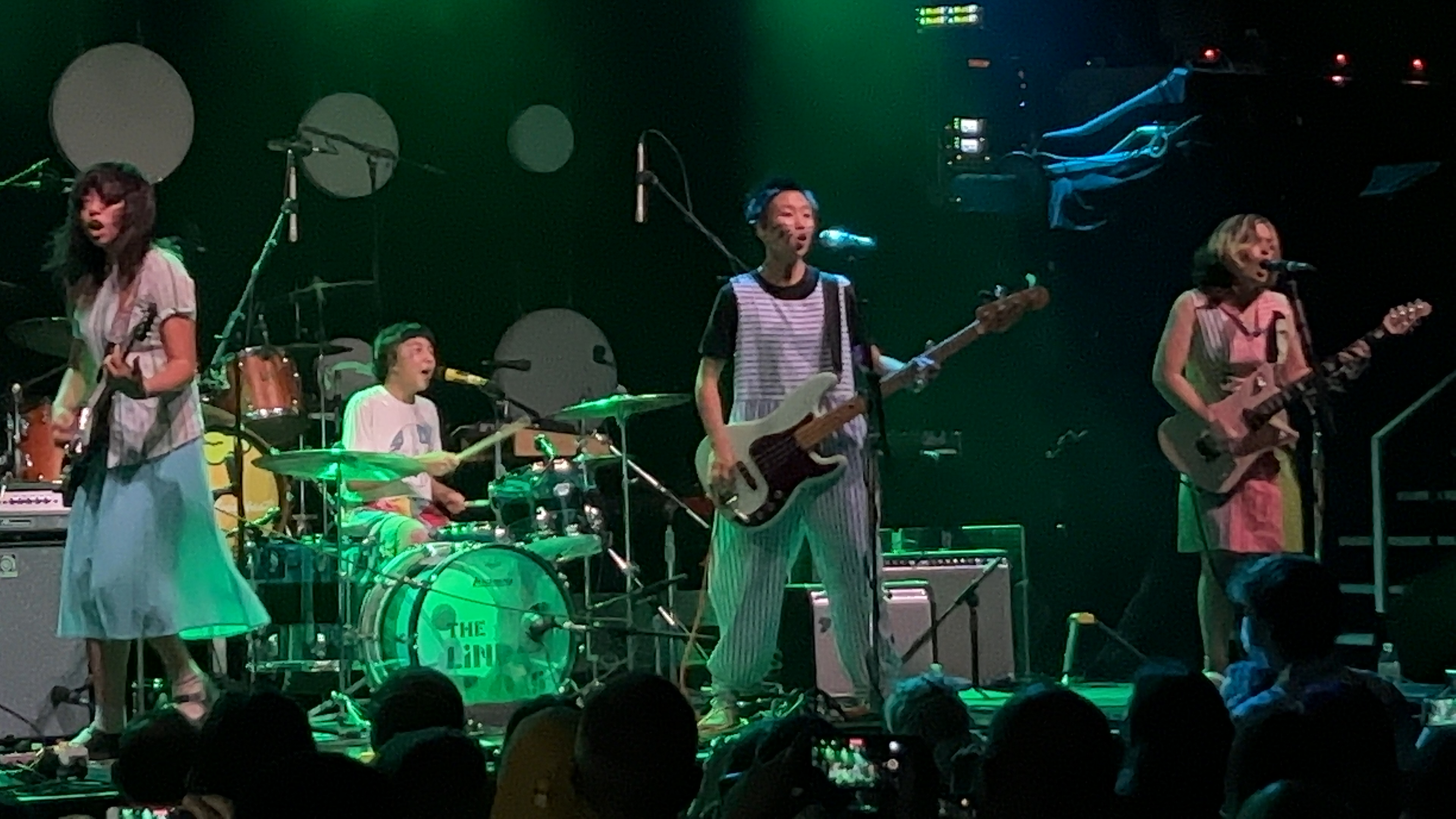
- The Linda Lindas performing live on July 11, 2022, at First Avenue; Left to right: Lucia de la Garza, Mila de la Garza, Eloise Wong, and Bela Salazar
- Studio albums: 2
- EPs: 2
- Singles: 16
- Music videos: 13

The discography of the Linda Lindas, an American rock band, consists of three studio albums, two extended plays (EPs), sixteen singles, and thirteen music videos.

The Linda Lindas was formed in Los Angeles in 2018 by Bela Salazar (guitar, vocals), Eloise Wong (bass guitar, vocals), Lucia de la Garza (guitar, vocals), and Mila de la Garza (drums, vocals). The Linda Lindas released their self-titled debut EP independently in 2020. In 2021, the band went viral with a performance of "Racist, Sexist Boy" and subsequently signed with the Los Angeles-based label Epitaph Records. They released another EP, Moxie (Music from the Netflix Film), which contains music that appeared in the Netflix film Moxie. The Linda Lindas released their debut album, entitled Growing Up, in 2022. Four singles were released from the album, including "Oh!", each along with music videos. The album peaked at number nineteen in the Billboard Top Album Sales. Their second album, No Obligation, was released in October 2024. It spawned six singles: "Too Many Things", "Resolution/Revolution", "All In My Head", "Yo Me Estreso", "No Obligation", and "Nothing Would Change".

== Albums ==
=== Studio albums ===
List of studio albums, with selected chart positions and certifications
Title	Album details	Peak chart positions				
Title	Album details	UK Indie	UK Digital	SCT	JPN	JPN Hot
Growing Up	Released: April 8, 2022; Label: Epitaph; Formats: CD, LP, digital download	15	32	54	49	92
No Obligation	Released: October 11, 2024; Label: Epitaph	—	—	—	—	—
Gotta Get Out	Released: August 28, 2026; Label: Reprise	TBA				
"—" denotes a recording that did not chart or was not released in that territory.

== Extended plays ==
List of EPs, with selected details
Title	EP details
The Linda Lindas	Released: December 2020; Label: The Linda Lindas (independent) (Note: The digital releases were released independently, though the LP was released by In the Red Records.); Formats: LP, digital download, streaming
Moxie (Music from the Netflix Film)	Released: March 5, 2021; Label: Netflix Music; Formats: Digital download, streaming

== Singles ==
List of singles, showing year released and album name
Title	Year	Peak chart positions	Album
Title	Year	US Alt.	Album
"Claudia Kishi"	2020	—	Non-album singles
"Vote!"	2020	—	Non-album singles
"Racist, Sexist Boy" (Live at LA Public Library)	2021	—	Non-album singles
"Oh!"	2021	—	Growing Up
"Nino"	2021	—	Growing Up
"Growing Up"	2022	—	Growing Up
"Talking to Myself"	2022	—	Growing Up
"Tonite"	2022	—	Non-album singles
"Groovy Xmas"	2022	—	Non-album singles
"Too Many Things"	2023	—	No Obligation
"Resolution/Revolution"	2023	—	No Obligation
"Little Bit 'O Soul" (from the Amazon Original Movie Totally Killer)	2023	—	Non-album single
"All In My Head"	2024	34	No Obligation
"Yo Me Estreso"	2024	—	No Obligation
"No Obligation"	2024	—	No Obligation
"Nothing Would Change"	2024	—	No Obligation
"California Sun"	2026	—	
"Burning Out"	2026	23	Gotta Get Out
"Closer"	2026	—	Gotta Get Out

=== As Featured artist ===
List of singles, showing year released and album name
Title	Year	Peak chart positions	Album
Title	Year	US AAA	Album
"Sick of the Times" (THAO and Tune-Yards feat. The Linda Lindas)	2026	36	Show Me

== Music videos ==
List of music videos, showing year released, director, and album
Title	Year	Director	Album
"Claudia Kishi"	2020	Eloise Wong	—N/a
"Nino"	2021	Rob Fidel	Growing Up
"Oh!"	2021	Ryan Baxley	Growing Up
"Talking to Myself"	2022	Ryan Baxley	Growing Up
"Groovy Xmas"	2022	Ryan Baxley	—N/a
"Growing Up"	2022	Humberto Leon	Growing Up
"Why"	2022	Elizabeth Ito	Growing Up
"Too Many Things"	2023	Ryan Baxley	No Obligation
"Resolution/Revolution"	2023	Bela Salazar	No Obligation
"All In My Head"	2024	James Wyatt	No Obligation
"Yo Me Estreso"	2024	Jenifer Juniper Stratford	No Obligation
"No Obligation"	2024	Akio Takimoto	No Obligation
“Nothing Would Change”	2024	Isabela Salazar	No Obligation

== Other appearances ==
=== Albums ===
List of non-single guest appearances, showing year released and album name
Title	Year	Album
"Little Babies" (Sleater-Kinney cover)	2022	Dig Me In: a Dig Me Out Covers Album
"Lost in Thought" (With Erica Dawn Lyle, Kathi Wilcox, and Vice Cooler)	2022	Land Trust: Benefit for North East Farmers of Color
"The News" (Paramore featuring the Linda Lindas)	2023	Re: This Is Why
"Found a Job" (Talking Heads cover)	2024	Everyone's Getting Involved

=== Soundtracks ===
List of songs included in various soundtracks
Title	Year	Film/TV Show
"Drown in My Own Tears"	2023	Harriet the Spy (season 2)

=== Music videos ===
List of music video appearances, showing year released, artist, director, and album
Title	Year	Artist(s)	Director(s)	Album
"Lost in Thought"	2022	Erica Dawn Lyle, Kathi Wilcox, and Vice Cooler	Vice Cooler	Land Trust: Benefit for North East Farmers of Color
"Bobby Sox"	2024	Green Day	Brendan Walter, Ryan Baxley	Saviors

== See also ==
- List of songs recorded by the Linda Lindas
