= List of songs recorded by the Linda Lindas =

The Linda Lindas in 2022; from left to right: Lucia de la Garza, Eloise Wong, Mila de la Garza, and Bela Salazar

American rock band the Linda Lindas have recorded songs for two studio albums, two extended plays (EPs), multiple singles, and other album appearances. The band consists of guitarist Lucia de la Garza, drummer Mila de la Garza, guitarist Bela Salazar and bassist Eloise Wong. Along with their main catalog, the Linda Lindas have appeared on one cover, one remix, and one tribute album, as well as soundtracks. Among the songs, eight are covers, and most were produced by Carlos de la Garza, the father of band members Lucia and Mila.

The Linda Lindas formed in 2018, and started out as a cover band, playing music from bands such as Le Tigre and the Go-Go's, whose "Tonite" they later released a cover of. The band released their debut single, "Claudia Kishi", independently in 2020, followed by the EP The Linda Lindas. In 2021, the band went viral with a performance of "Racist, Sexist Boy" and subsequently signed with the Los Angeles-based label Epitaph Records. They released another EP, Moxie (Music from the Netflix Film), which contains covers of Bikini Kill's "Rebel Girl" and the Muffs' "Big Mouth" that appeared in the Netflix film Moxie. The Linda Lindas released their debut album, entitled Growing Up, in 2022. Four singles were released from the album: "Oh!", "Nino", "Growing Up", and "Talking to Myself". On the deluxe edition of the album, the band covered the Blue Hearts' song "Linda Linda", for which the band was named. Growing Up is centered on themes of growing up, discovering oneself, and anxieties that arise in adolescence. The album's genre has been classified as punk rock, pop-punk, and power pop. From the album, "Cuántas Veces" has been noted for its bossa nova influences and "Racist, Sexist Boy" has often been compared to the riot grrrl sound. (Note: As discussed by Alternative Press's Augusta Battoclette, Consequence of Sound's Wren Graves, The Washington Post's Derek Hawkins, and Exclaim!'s Allie Gregory.)

Their second album, No Obligation, was released in 2024. Three of its songs have been released as singles: "Too Many Things", "Resolution/Revolution", and "All In My Head". In a press release, the Linda Lindas said they would be experimenting with post-punk, garage rock, power pop, new wave, and rock en español on the album.

== Songs ==
Key
†	Indicates single release
‡	Song not written by members of the Linda Lindas

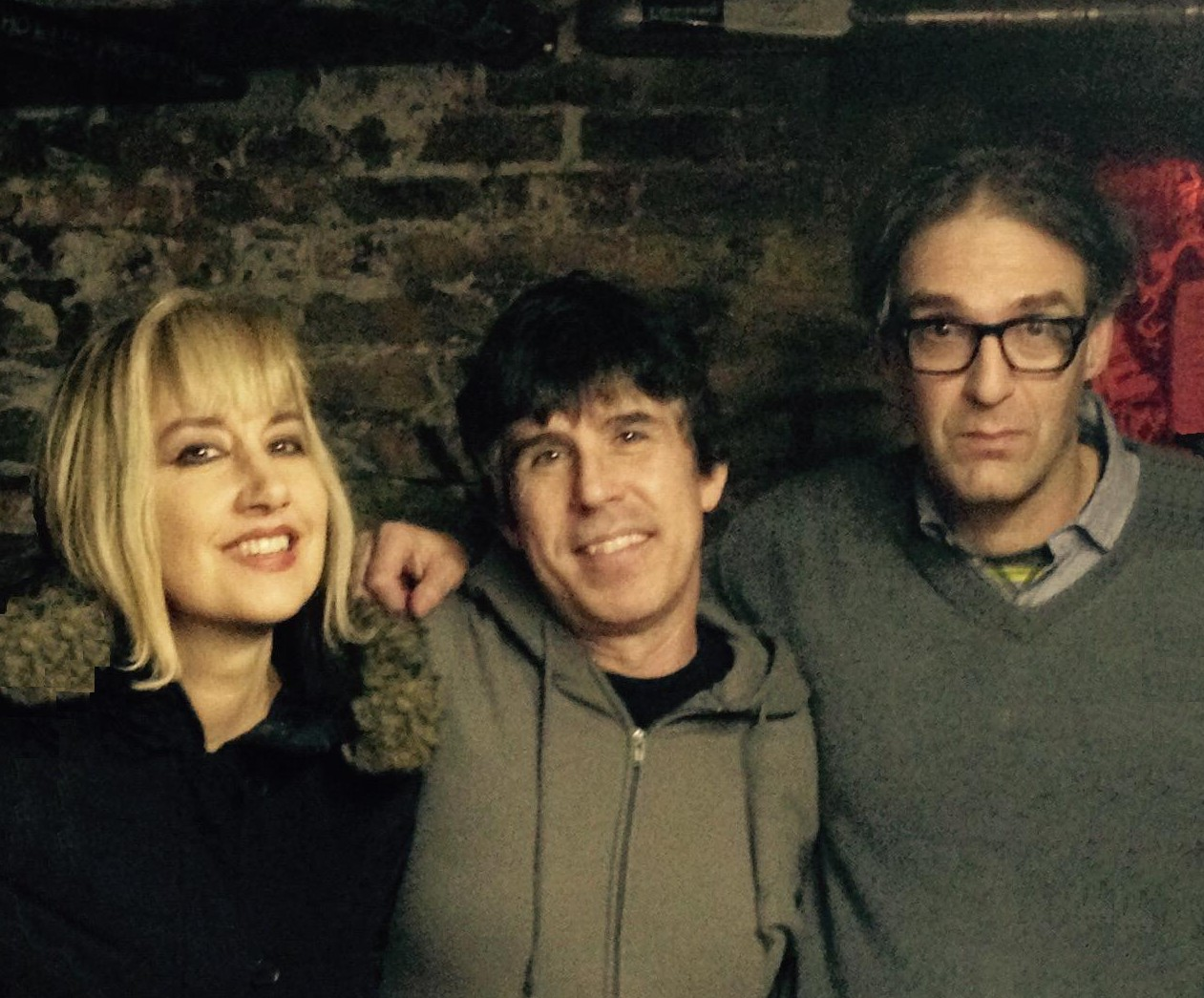
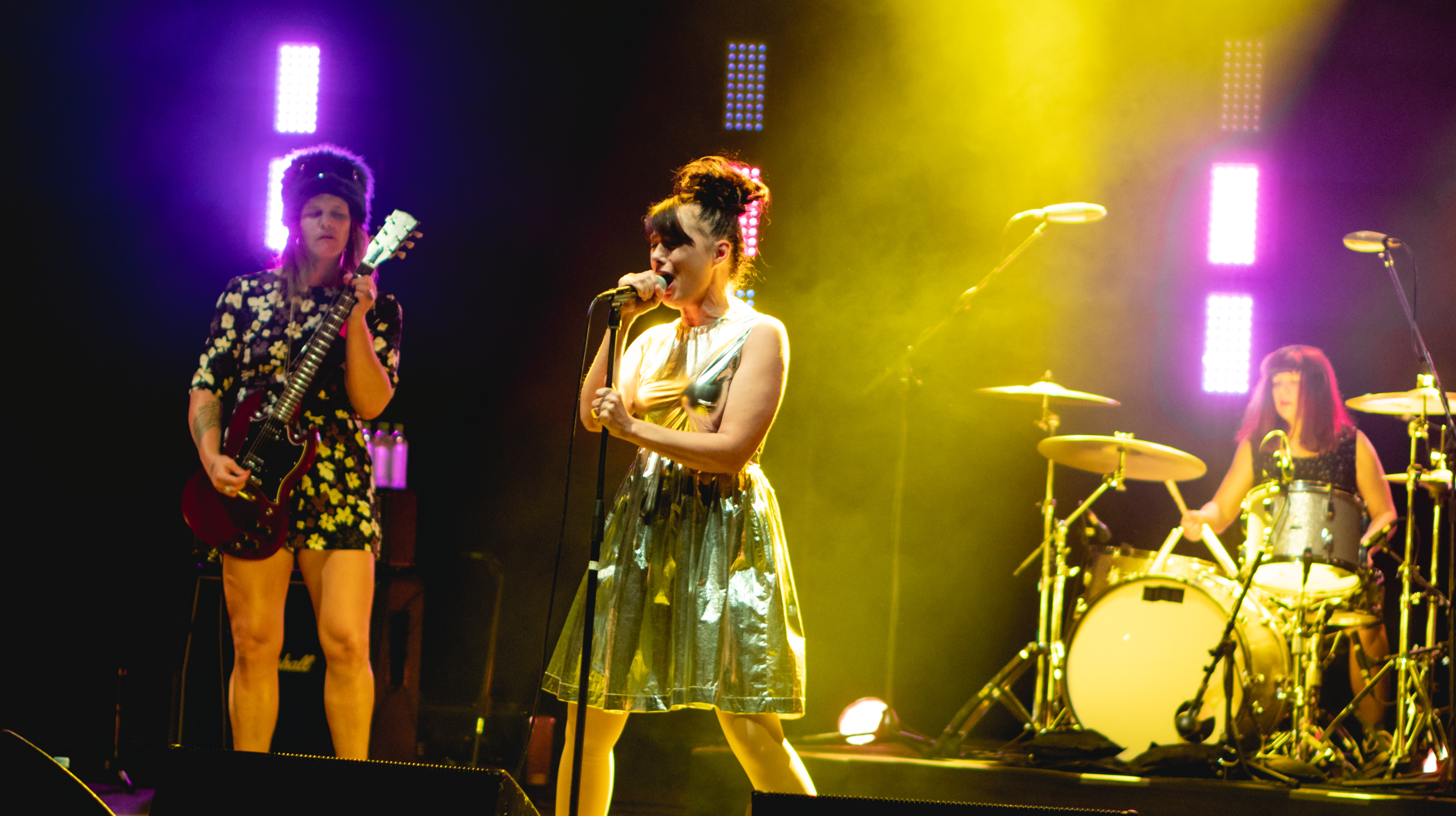
The Linda Lindas covered "Big Mouth" by the Muffs (top) and "Rebel Girl" by Bikini Kill (bottom) for the 2021 film Moxie.

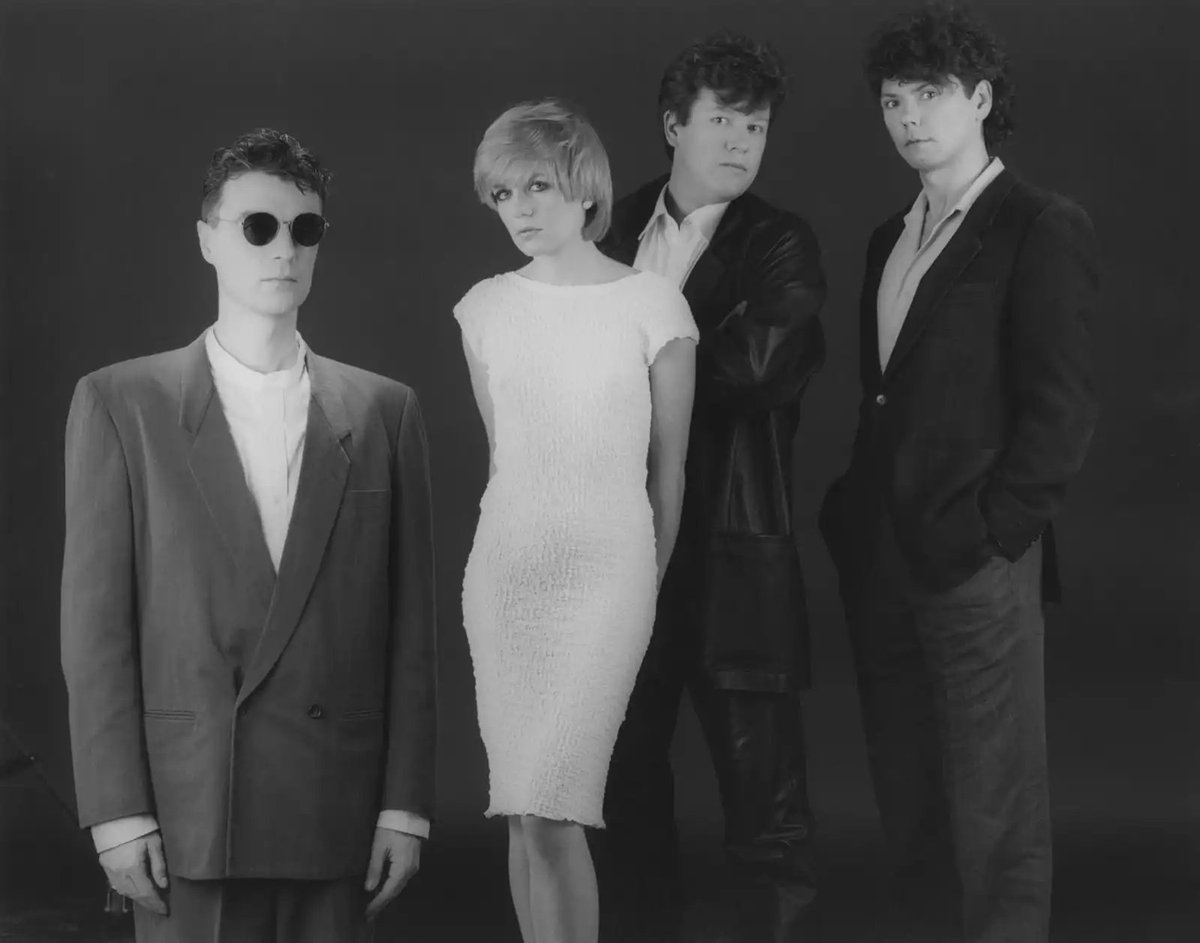
The Linda Lindas covered "Found a Job" for a Talking Heads tribute album entitled Everyone's Getting Involved.

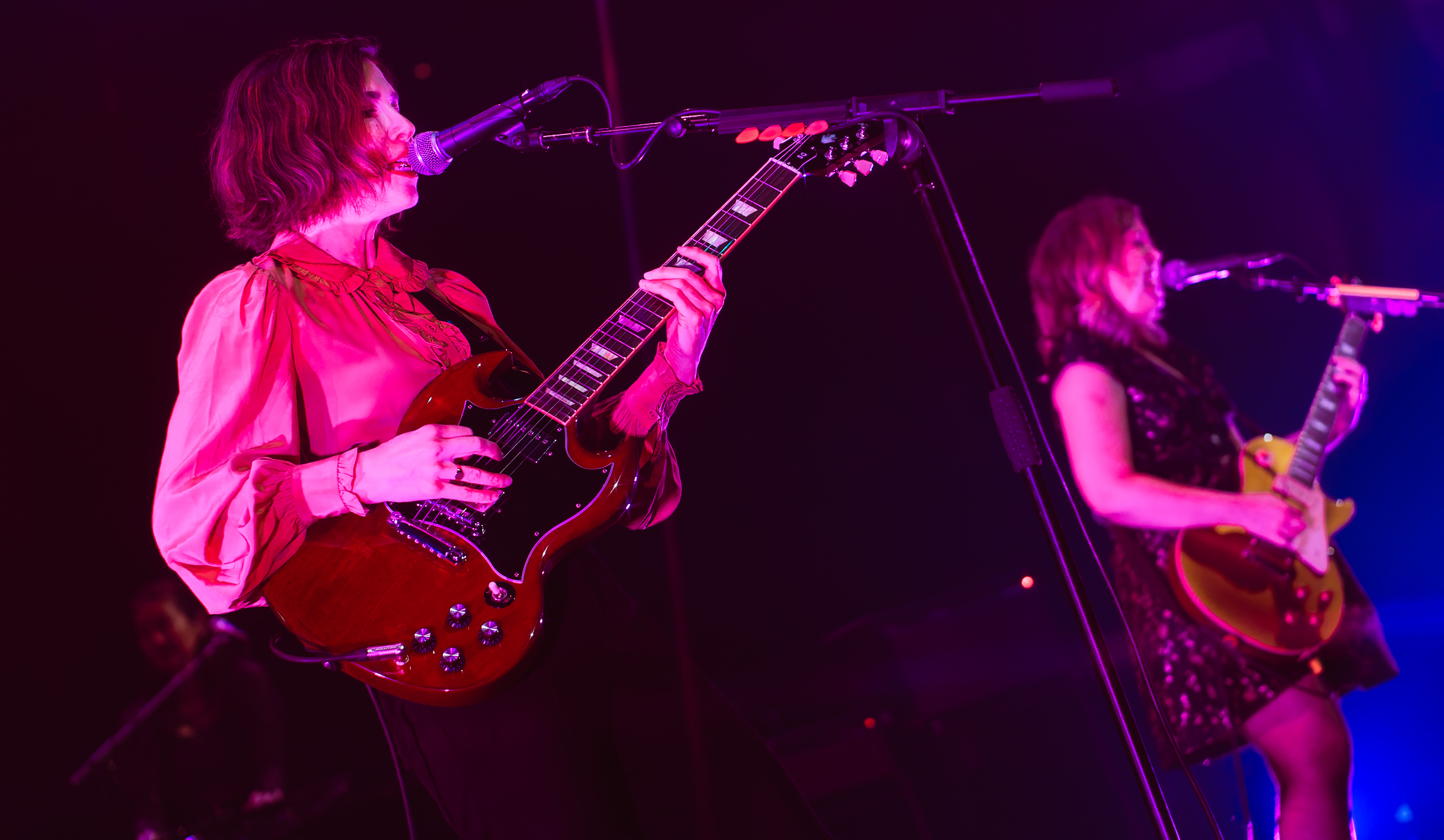
The Linda Lindas covered "Little Babies" by Sleater-Kinney for an album of covers from Dig Me Out.

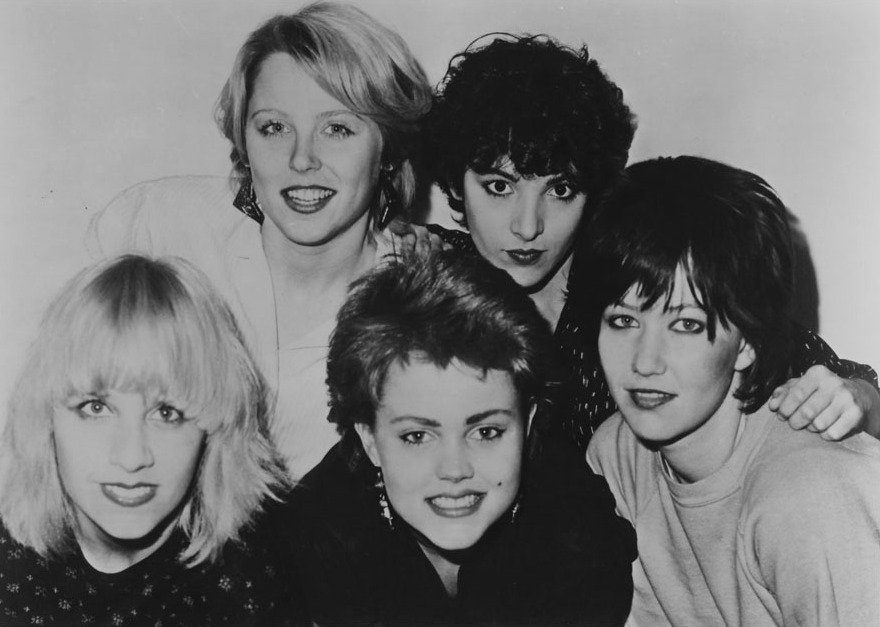
The Linda Lindas covered "Tonite" by the Go-Go's for a 2022 single.

Name of song, songwriter(s), original release and year of release
Title	Songwriter(s)	Original release	Year	Ref.
"All in My Head" †	Lucia de la Garza	No Obligation	2024	
"Big Mouth"	Kim Shattuck ‡	Moxie (Music from the Netflix film)	2021	
"California Sun" †	Henry Glover ‡	Non-album single	2026	
"Cartographers"	Lucia de la Garza; Mila de la Garza; Bela Salazar; Eloise Wong	No Obligation	2024	
"Claudia Kishi" †	Lucia de la Garza; Mila de la Garza; Bela Salazar; Eloise Wong	Non-album single	2022	
"Cuántas Veces"	Bela Salazar	Growing Up	2022	
"Don't Think"	Lucia de la Garza; Mila de la Garza; Bela Salazar; Eloise Wong	No Obligation	2024	
"Drown in My Own Tears"	Henry Glover ‡	Harriet the Spy: Season 2 (Apple Original Series Soundtrack)	2023	
"Excuse Me"	Lucia de la Garza; Mila de la Garza; Bela Salazar; Eloise Wong	No Obligation	2024	
"Fine"	Eloise Wong	Growing Up	2022	
"Found a Job"	David Byrne ‡	Everyone's Getting Involved: A Tribute to Talking Heads' Stop Making Sense	2024	
"Groovy Xmas" †	Lucia de la Garza; Mila de la Garza; Bela Salazar; Eloise Wong	Non-album single	2022	
"Growing Up" †	Lucia de la Garza	Growing Up	2022	
"I'm So Happy to Be Little"	Jarond Durer Gibbs ‡	Yo Gabba GabbaLand! Season 1 Soundtrack	2024	
"Linda Linda"	Hiroto Kōmoto ‡	Growing Up (bonus edition)	2023	
"Little Babies"	Sleater-Kinney ‡	Dig Me In: a Dig Me Out Covers Album	2022	
"Little Bit O' Soul" (Note: "Little Bit O' Soul" appeared on the soundtrack of the film Totally Killer.) †	John Carter; Ken Lewis ‡	Non-album single	2023	
"Lose Yourself"	Lucia de la Garza; Mila de la Garza; Bela Salazar; Eloise Wong	No Obligation	2024	
"Lost in Thought"	Erica Dawn Lyle; Kathi Wilcox; Vice Cooler ‡	Land Trust: Benefit for North East Farmers of Color	2022	
"Magic"	Lucia de la Garza; Mila de la Garza	Growing Up	2022	
"Missing You"	Lucia de la Garza; Mila de la Garza; Bela Salazar; Eloise Wong	The Linda Lindas	2020	
"Monica"	Lucia de la Garza; Mila de la Garza; Bela Salazar; Eloise Wong	The Linda Lindas	2020	
"Never Say Never"	Lucia de la Garza; Mila de la Garza; Bela Salazar; Eloise Wong	The Linda Lindas	2020	
"Nino" †	Bela Salazar	Growing Up	2022	
"No Clue"	Lucia de la Garza; Mila de la Garza; Bela Salazar; Eloise Wong	The Linda Lindas	2020	
"No Obligation"	Lucia de la Garza; Mila de la Garza; Bela Salazar; Eloise Wong	No Obligation	2024	
"Nothing Would Change"	Lucia de la Garza; Mila de la Garza; Bela Salazar; Eloise Wong	No Obligation	2024	
"Oh!" †	Lucia de la Garza; Mila de la Garza; Bela Salazar; Eloise Wong	Growing Up	2022	
"Once Upon a Time"	Lucia de la Garza; Mila de la Garza; Bela Salazar; Eloise Wong	No Obligation	2024	
"Racist, Sexist Boy" (Note: A live edition of "Racist, Sexist Boy" was released as a single in 2021.)	Mila de la Garza; Eloise Wong	Growing Up	2022	
"Rebel Girl"	Kathleen Hanna; Billy Karren; Tobi Vail; Kathi Wilcox ‡	Moxie (Music from the Netflix film)	2021	
"Remember"	Lucia de la Garza	Growing Up	2022	
"Resolution/Revolution" †	Lucia de la Garza; Mila de la Garza; Bela Salazar; Eloise Wong	No Obligation	2023	
"Stop"	Lucia de la Garza; Mila de la Garza; Bela Salazar; Eloise Wong	No Obligation	2024	
"Talking to Myself" †	Mila de la Garza	Growing Up	2022	
"Tonite" †	Charlotte Caffey; Peter Case; Jane Wiedlin ‡	Non-album single	2022	
"Too Many Things" †	Lucia de la Garza; Mila de la Garza; Bela Salazar; Eloise Wong	No Obligation	2023	
"Vote!" †	Eloise Wong	Non-album single	2020	
"Why"	Eloise Wong	Growing Up	2022	
"Yo Me Estreso"	Lucia de la Garza; Mila de la Garza; Bela Salazar; Eloise Wong	No Obligation	2024	

== See also ==
- The Linda Lindas discography
