= Running Out of Time (song) =

Single by Paramore

from the album This Is Why
- Released: May 23, 2023
- Genre: Pop rock; dance-rock
- Length: 3:12
- Label: Atlantic
- Songwriters: Hayley Williams; Taylor York; Zac Farro
- Producer: Carlos de la Garza

Paramore singles chronology
"C'est Comme Ça" (2023)	"Running Out of Time" (2023)	"Burning Down the House" (2024)

Music video
- "Running Out of Time" on YouTube

"Running Out of Time" is a song by the American rock band Paramore. It was released on May 23, 2023, by Atlantic Records as the fourth single from the band's sixth studio album This Is Why (2023). Hayley Williams, Taylor York, and Zac Farro wrote the song in the early stages of the album's production, and Carlos de la Garza produced it. The band premiered the song at a concert at the Grand Ole Opry on February 7, 2023, and performed it on Jimmy Kimmel Live! on February 14.

Described by critics as a pop-rock and dance-rock song, "Running Out of Time" deals with time management and comments on social anxieties over death, aging, and losing friends. Williams said the song was influenced by her personal struggle with punctuality and her friendship with Taylor Swift. Critics positively reviewed the song, praising its lyrics as playful and its composition as well balanced. In 2023, the song peaked on the New Zealand Hot Singles chart, the UK Singles Chart, and the Billboard Hot Rock & Alternative Songs and Rock Airplay charts in the United States, and ranked on Billboard's year-end Alternative Airplay chart.

Ivanna Borin directed a music video for "Running Out of Time" that Paramore released on February 16, 2023. In the video, Williams enters an Alice in Wonderland-themed world, where she confronts the anxieties addressed in the song. The video received praise for its costuming, including vintage Vivienne Westwood and contemporary Rodarte outfits.

== Background and release ==
After Paramore released their critically acclaimed fifth studio album After Laughter in 2017 and cut their fourth world tour short, the band took its first hiatus since its formation in 2004. During that hiatus, the band's members focused on their mental health and pursued individual projects. In May 2020, the band's lead singer, Hayley Williams, stated that their next album would be guitar-driven, and in January 2022, she confirmed that the band had begun recording the album in late 2021.

In September 2022, Paramore announced the upcoming release of their sixth album, This Is Why. The album's title track and lead single "This Is Why" was released on September 28. The band also revealed plans for a tour to promote the album that would start in October. The album's second single "The News" was released on December 8, and its third single "C'est Comme Ça" was released on January 12, 2023.

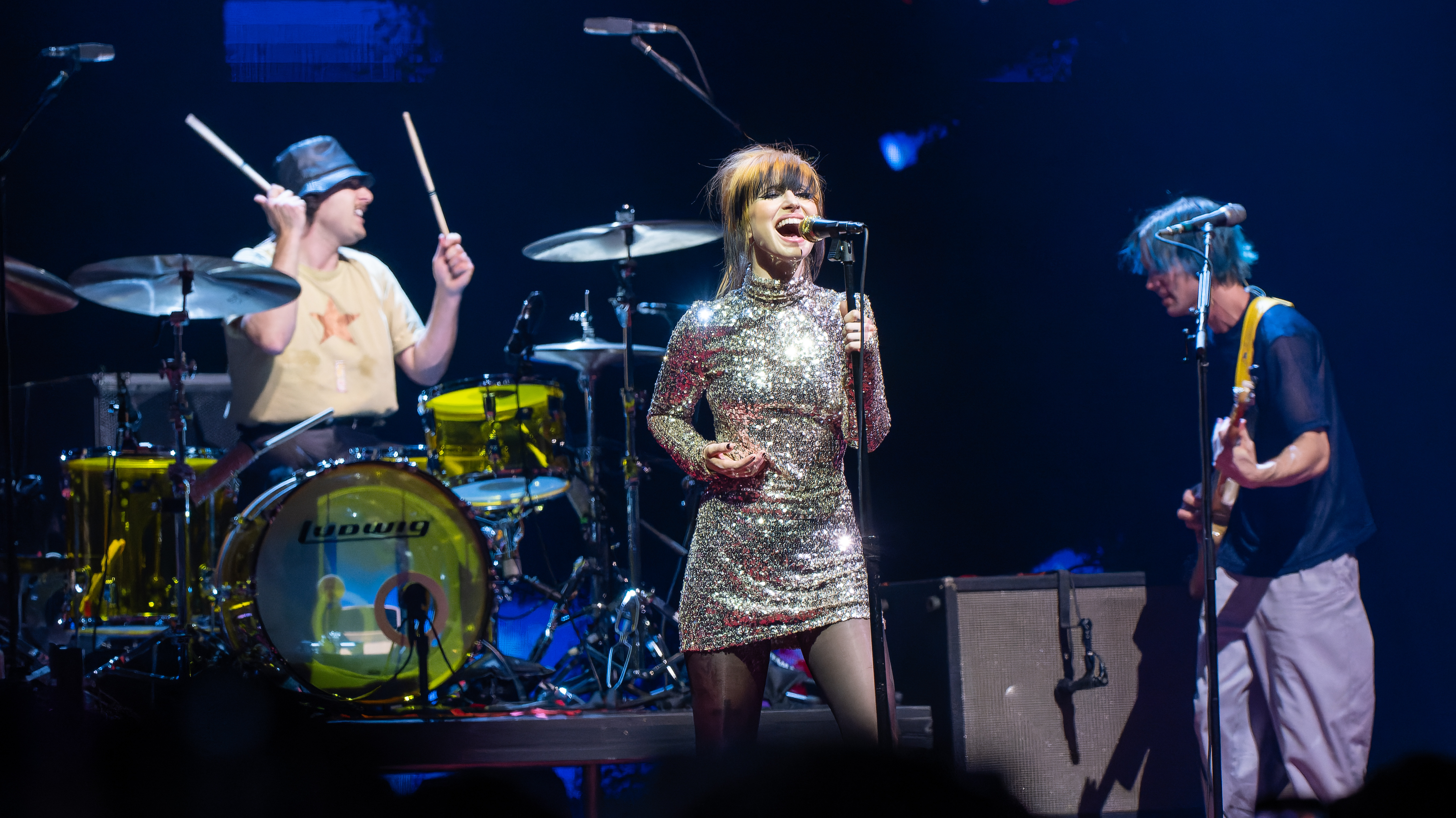
Paramore performing on April 20, 2023, during the This Is Why Tour

The band premiered "Running Out of Time" at the Grand Ole Opry in Nashville, Tennessee, on February 7. When introducing the song, Williams remarked: "This is a song about how I'm late to everything ... It's really not that deep unless you want to think about the planet dying. Then it can be that deep." This Is Why was released on February 10. In the lead-up to the album's release, the band distributed flexi disc singles of "Running Out of Time" at live release parties. The band also performed the song on Jimmy Kimmel Live! on February 14. The release of the music video followed on February 16.

Atlantic Records released "Running Out of Time" as an alternative radio single on May 23, 2023. The song was written by Williams, along with Paramore's guitarist Taylor York, and drummer Zac Farro. Carlos de la Garza recorded and produced the song in Los Angeles. According to Williams, the song was written in the early stages of the album's production; she first conceived the chorus and then wrote the lyrics. Williams said that she "wanted to challenge [herself] to write about ordinary things". She mentioned that focusing on everyday topics prevented her from "getting all deep and dark", but emphasized that exploring those emotions parallels the anxieties many feel about life in 2023 on planet Earth. On October 6, 2023, Paramore released a remix album of This Is Why containing a remix of the song by Panda Bear.

== Composition and themes ==
"Running Out of Time"
The song's introduction, featuring a guitar riff that starts on the offbeat, "invok[ing] the sensation of having 'run out of time'"

The Alternative and Stereogum have described "Running Out of Time" as a pop-rock and dance-rock song. The song opens on the off beat with a bluesy guitar riff, resolving to F-sharp major for the verse. The verse, with a syncopated beat, has Williams singing over chromatic mediant and stable tonic chords, and features sixth chords. In the pre-chorus, the chords remain the same as those in the verse but with a less-syncopated rhythm. In the bridge, the guitar takes on a groovy tone, over which Williams sings several blue notes.

The main lyrical themes of "Running Out of Time" are time management, anxiety, and the making of excuses. Throughout the song, Williams repeatedly sings the line "I ran out of time" as an excuse for failing to perform several personal tasks, such as walking her dog, taking flowers to her neighbor, and sending condolences. Writing for Rolling Stone, Larisha Paul said that the song's "arsenal of excuses" create "metaphorical fires and hyperbolic deadlines". In The Line of Best Fit, Steven Loftin said the song uses the excuse of "ditching out on plans under the guise of existential dread" as an example of the anxieties of the 2020s. Writing for Sputnik Music, Sowing noted that the lyrics, with lines like "Intentions only get you so far, a harsh reality to discover", address the feeling of being overwhelmed by the desire to improve oneself. In a review for Stereogum, Vivek Maddala analyzed the song's structure and composition, concluding that they reflect the song's themes; for example, starting the guitar riff on the off beat creates a sense of rushing, resonating with the central theme of running out of time.

Other critics have stated that "Running Out of Time" addresses social anxieties related to aging, death, and interacting with other people. Alexis Petridis wrote in The Guardian that the song captures the fear of growing up and apprehension of our own death. Writing for The New Yorker, Carrie Battan said the song addresses contemporary anxieties among millennials, such as becoming antisocial and growing older, and is illustrative of a broader cultural turn to nostalgia. Consequence critic Mary Sikory linked the song's theme of running out of time to music's nostalgic return to genres that were popular in the early 2000s, like pop-punk and emo.

Williams has said that "Running Out of Time" is about her being "horrific at time management", and is also a reflection on her intentions and character. In an interview with Zane Lowe for Apple Music 1, Williams said the song was also influenced by her friendship with Taylor Swift. According to Williams, Swift showed her a closet full of items to give people as gifts, which made her realize "my life is so not together" and "I can barely remember to send someone a card or flowers".

== Reception and commercial performance ==
"Running Out of Time" received positive critical reviews for its tone. Bobby Olivier for Spin praised the song's theme and lyrics, calling the track "playful" and "an anthem for enemies of punctuality". He described it as "a sequel to Afroman's 'Because I Got High'". Writing for NPR Music, Clarissa Brooks rated the track among the best of the album and said it explores the post-COVID-19 pandemic cultural milieu in a "refreshing kind of snark[y]" tone. Phoebe Flys in Classic Rock called the song a "siren call to the tardy" that is underpinned by exasperation. The Alternative called the song "a well-performed, well-produced piece of nothing".

Other critics praised "Running Out of Time" for its musical composition, particularly its balance of disparate elements. Helen Brown for The Independent said: "Williams' shrieks of 'Be there in five!' are prettily balanced by sweetly crooned backing vocals". No Ripcord called the song "sprightly", favorably comparing its "jump[y]", "choppy verses and svelte hooks" to the "shoehorned" sound of the "disaffected sing-speak" and "childish chorus" on "C'est Comme Ça". Clash also compared the track with "C'est Comme Ça", contrasting Williams' "wonderfully conspicuous staccato vocals" on the latter with "guitarist Taylor York's glitchy anacrusis" on the former. In Paste, Grant Sharples said the track "strikes a balance between atmospheric textures and syncopated buoyancy that is, simply put, really fucking fun". Billboard ranked "Running Out of Time" the third-best track on the album, and stated that it is "accessible" and a "standout". Mary Sikory of Consequence rated it an "essential track".

In 2023, "Running Out of Time" peaked at number 18 on the New Zealand Hot Singles chart, 74 on the UK Singles Chart, and 18 and 32 on the Billboard Hot Rock & Alternative Songs and Rock Airplay charts in the United States, respectively. The song ranked 43rd on Billboard's 2023 year-end Alternative Airplay chart.

== Music video ==
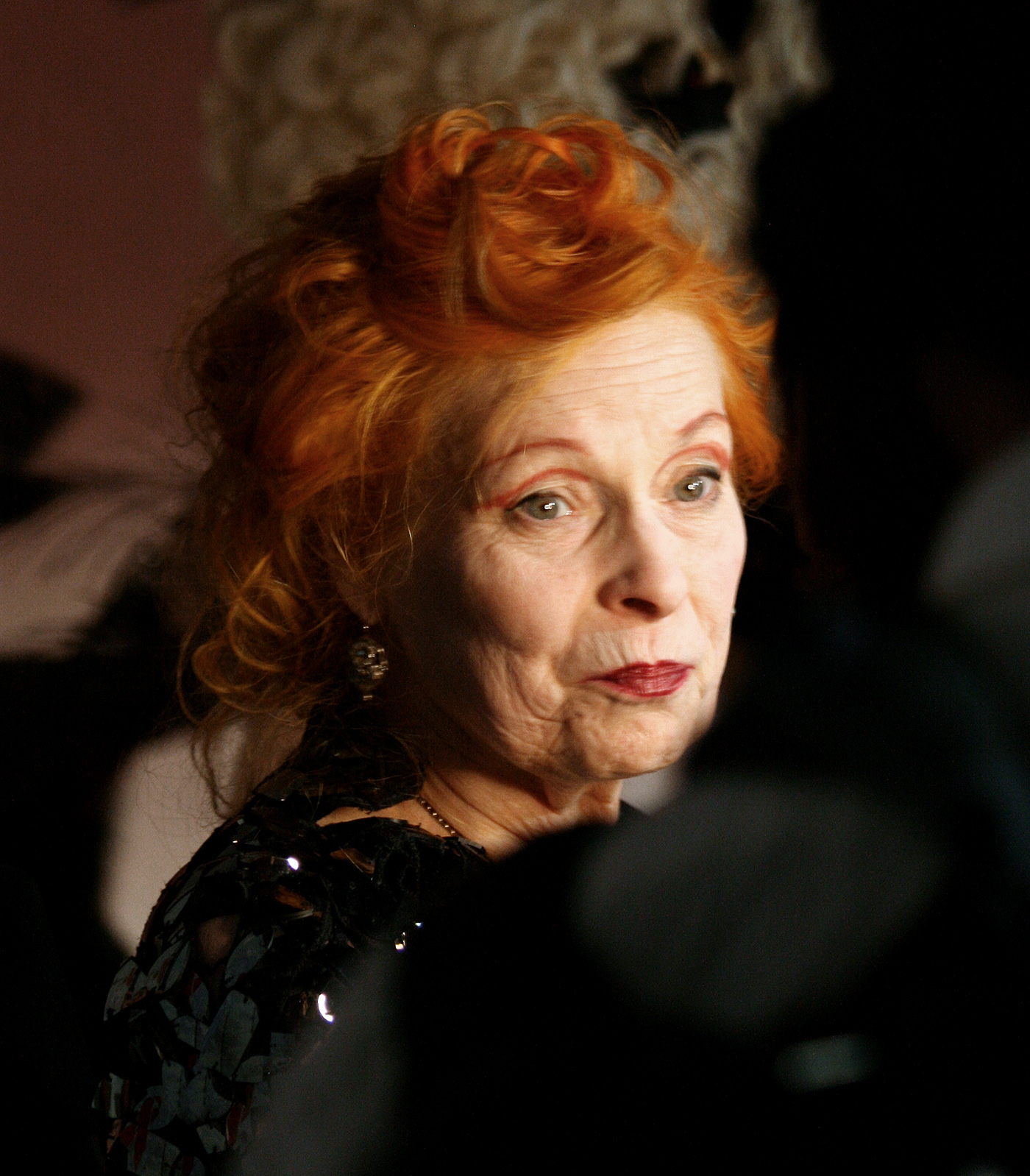
Hayley Williams wears vintage clothing by Vivienne Westwood (pictured in 2011) in the song's music video.

The music video for "Running Out of Time", directed by Ivanna Borin, was released on February 16, 2023. It depicts Williams being pulled from a recording studio into an Alice in Wonderland-themed world, where the instruments have come to life and begun to approach her. After entering the dream world through a guitar case, Williams, along with York and Farro, navigate through a colorful and distorted landscape that reflects the anxieties of the song's lyrics. The band members, whose limbs have grown several feet in length, work through unusual situations and then run on a track in outer space back to the studio. Adrian Garro, writing for Rock Cellar Magazine, compared the music video to 1990s videos by Nirvana and the Smashing Pumpkins. The video was shortlisted in the best international rock video category at the 2023 UK Music Video Awards.

In the music video, Williams wears several outfits by the British designer Vivienne Westwood, including a corset from Westwood's 1990 Portrait collection and a golden dress from her Spring/Summer 2016 collection. Lindsey Hartman, the band's stylist, said that Westwood was her and Williams' "ultimate hero" and that they decided to commemorate her when they filmed the music video in 2022, shortly after her death. Williams also wears a red Rodarte dress while running on the track at the end of the music video; Williams also wore Rodarte afterward on the This Is Why Tour.

== Personnel ==
Credits are from the liner notes for This Is Why.

- Hayley Williams – vocals, percussion, piano, recording
- Taylor York – guitars, keyboards, programming, vibraphone, glockenspiel, recording
- Zac Farro – drums, percussion, keyboards, programming, vibraphone, glockenspiel, recording
- Carlos de la Garza – production
- Brian Robert Jones – bass guitar
- Henry Solomon – bass clarinet, clarinet, flute, alto flute
- Phil Danyew – keyboards, programming
- Emerson Mancini – mastering
- Manny Marroquin – mixing
- Harriet Tam – engineering
- Zach Pereya – mixing assistance
- Anthony Vilchis – mixing assistance
- Trey Station – mixing assistance
- Scott Moore – engineering assistance
- Kyle McAulay – engineering assistance
- Patrick Kehrier – engineering assistance
- Joey Mullen – drum technician
- Erik Bailey – guitar technician
- Joanne Almeida – guitar technician

== Charts ==
=== Weekly charts ===
Weekly chart performance for "Running Out of Time"
Chart (2023)	Peak position
New Zealand Hot Singles (RMNZ)	18
UK Singles (Official Charts)	74
US Hot Rock & Alternative Songs (Billboard)	18
US Rock & Alternative Airplay (Billboard)	32

=== Year-end charts ===
Year-end chart performance for "Running Out of Time"
Chart (2023)	Position
US Alternative Airplay (Billboard)	43

== Release history ==
Release dates and formats for "Running Out of Time"
Region	Date	Format(s)	Label	Ref.
Various	February 10, 2023	Digital download; streaming	Atlantic	
United States	May 23, 2023	Alternative radio	Atlantic	
Various	May 29, 2023	Flexi disc	Atlantic	
