= Inside Out 2 (soundtrack) =

Inside Out 2 (Original Motion Picture Soundtrack)

Soundtrack album by Andrea Datzman
- Released: June 14, 2024
- Recorded: 2023–2024
- Studios: Eastwood Scoring Stage, Warner Bros., Los Angeles
- Length: 67:00
- Label: Walt Disney
- Producers: Andrea Datzman; Michael Giacchino

Inside Out 2 (Original Motion Picture Soundtrack) is the soundtrack album to the 2024 Disney/Pixar film of the same name. The original score is composed by Andrea Datzman, making her the first woman to score a Pixar feature film. The scoring was held at Warner Bros. Eastwood Scoring Stage. The album was released by Walt Disney Records on June 14, 2024, the same day as the film's theatrical release.

== Background and development ==
In March 2024, it was reported that Andrea Datzman would compose Inside Out 2's score. Datzman previously composed the music for Pixar's short Carl's Date (2023) and co-scored the studio's animated shorts series Dug Days (2021) with Curtis Green. Several of Giacchino's original themes from the first Inside Out are utilized in the score. The scoring was held at Warner Bros. Eastwood Scoring Stage. Inside Out 2 marks the first Pixar feature film to be scored by a woman.

Datzman incorporated rock elements into the film's score in an effort to capture how Riley physically felt while playing hockey. She was in part inspired after attending a roller skating event in Burbank, California, and described a DJ at the event as playing an "awesome mix of psychobilly, metal, punk, and pop punk." The composer cited the Sense of Self theme as her favourite contribution to the score. Succinct versions of the theme can be heard at the beginning of the film, and an extended version is played when Riley's Core Belief System is shown for the first time. Inspired by Radiohead's "Everything in Its Right Place", Datzman recorded herself mumble-speaking for the Core Belief System. She described the sounds as the "stream of consciousness in the back of your head." After recording different pitches of her mumbles, she gave it a "sort of cathedral treatment", with the theme evolving in different ways as Riley's mental state does in the story.

Datzman added ten new musical elements to the score. She gave each new character its own treatment or motif, with Anxiety having the most versatile of them. Like with all the emotions, she wanted to musically represent how anxiety felt. She described the emotion as a "zing" or "bolt of lighting" to get a person's attention, which then "convinces you to listen in all these different ways and all these different variations." Riley's panic attack scene features a deconstruction of Anxiety's theme. It consists of an alarm and a solo violin playing on A repeatedly, which the composer puts through different processors. She described it as an "emotional message getting conveyed and skewed" and added, "We don't know what to be afraid of anymore, but everything is scary."

== Release and reception ==
The soundtrack album was released by Walt Disney Records on June 14, 2024, the same day as the film's theatrical release. It will be released on vinyl by Mutant in partnership with Walt Disney Records later in October 2024.

In a review of the film for The Hollywood Reporter, David Rooney said that "The spirited score by Andrea Datzman makes everything pop even more." Ross Bonaime of Collider called the score "tremendous", adding that it builds upon Giacchino's work in "subtle and brilliant ways." Christian Clemmensen of Filmtracks gave the score a 3 out of 5 star rating. They wrote, "Overall, Datzman's sequel score is an intelligent advancement of the first score's style and narrative, and your appreciation for the music for Inside Out 2 on album will largely depend upon your level of engagement with the first score's similar style." Oscar Jacks of Screenaholics praised the score's ability to musically portray anxiety. Several critics also opined that while the score had its strong suits, it paled in comparison to Giacchino's work in the original film. Matthew Stogdon of The Red Right Hand Movie Reviews described the score as safe in comparison to the original, and said "Michael Giacchino's themes gave us a Peter And The Wolf level of expressive leitmotifs and assigned instruments for each emotion. And while these are largely back, they have become somewhat ambient and pedestrian."

== Track listing ==
All music is composed by Andrea Datzman, except where noted.

Inside Out 2 (Original Motion Picture Soundtrack)
No.	Title	Composer(s)	Length
1.	"Outside Intro"	Datzman; Michael Giacchino	0:55
2.	"Go Team!"	Datzman; Giacchino	2:27
3.	"The Life of Riley"	Datzman; Giacchino	2:32
4.	"Thread the Needle"	Datzman; Giacchino	1:06
5.	"Riley Protection System"	Datzman; Giacchino	2:46
6.	"Creating a Sense of Self"		1:30
7.	"Demo Day"		1:57
8.	"Ride and Prejudice"		2:18
9.	"Anxious to Meet You"		2:21
10.	"Seeking Val-idation"		1:44
11.	"Sending Out an S.o.S."		2:45
12.	"Bloofy & Co."		2:59
13.	"Flight for Fighting"		2:49
14.	"Fawn of a New Day"		0:56
15.	"Return to Imagination Land"	Datzman; Giacchino	1:08
16.	"To Project and Disserve"	Datzman; Giacchino	3:19
17.	"What's the Big Idea?"	Datzman; Giacchino	2:31
18.	"Red Hairing"		1:18
19.	"Recovering a Sense of Self"		2:55
20.	"Joyless"		1:53
21.	"The Puck Drops Here"		2:58
22.	"A Mind at Freeze"		2:44
23.	"Growing Up Is Hard to Do"		4:19
24.	"Glide and Joy"	Datzman; Giacchino	2:01
25.	"Every Messy, Beautiful Part of Her"		2:44
26.	"Inside Outro"		2:21
27.	"Done Track Mind"	Datzman; Giacchino	8:15
Total length:			67:00

== Additional music ==
The film also features additional original pieces: "Bloofy's House Theme Song" written by Jennifer Rowekamp and performed by Ron Funches, "Baller Dash" by John Park, "TripleDent Gum Jingle" (also from the first film) performed by Datzman and Nick Pitera, and "Can't Slow Us Down" by Henry Beasley and Simon Oscroft. Licensed songs featured include "It's the Time of Our Lives" by Paris Carney and Lucky West and "Growing Up" by the Linda Lindas.
