= This Is Why =

2023 studio album by Paramore

Studio album by Paramore
- Released: February 10, 2023
- Recorded: 2022
- Studio: United (Los Angeles); Music Friends (Los Angeles); Glenwood Place (Burbank)
- Genre: Post-punk; dance-punk; art punk; alternative rock; new wave
- Length: 36:12
- Label: Atlantic
- Producer: Carlos de la Garza

Paramore chronology
After Laughter (2017)	This Is Why (2023)	Re: This Is Why (2023)

Singles from This Is Why
- 1. "This Is Why" Released: September 28, 2022; 2. "The News" Released: December 8, 2022; 3. "C'est Comme Ça" Released: January 12, 2023; 4. "Running Out of Time" Released: February 16, 2023

This Is Why is the sixth studio album by the American rock band Paramore, released on February 10, 2023, through Atlantic Records, their final studio album for the label. It is their first album since 2017, following After Laughter, and the second recorded by the lineup of Hayley Williams, Taylor York, and Zac Farro, marking the first time the band's lineup has been consistent between two albums. The album was supported by four singles: "This Is Why", "The News", "C'est Comme Ça", and "Running Out of Time".

This Is Why received critical acclaim and debuted at number two on the Billboard 200 with 64,000 album-equivalent units in its first week, 47,000 of which were pure album sales. A remix album, Re: This Is Why, was released October 6, 2023, featuring remixed, reworked, and rewritten versions of songs from This Is Why by different artists. The album won Best Rock Album and the album's title track won Best Alternative Music Performance at the 66th Annual Grammy Awards; Paramore was the first female-fronted rock band to win the Grammy Award for Best Rock Album.

== Background and recording ==
In May 2017, Paramore released their fifth studio album After Laughter to critical acclaim. The album saw the return of former drummer Zac Farro, who had left the band in 2010. The band toured in support of the album from June 2017 until September 2018. Following the conclusion of the After Laughter Tour, the members of Paramore took a break from writing and recording music for the band and worked on other endeavors. Hayley Williams featured on the American Football song "Uncomfortably Numb" in 2019 and released two solo albums, Petals for Armor (2020) and Flowers for Vases / Descansos (2021); the former produced by Paramore guitarist Taylor York. She also pivoted her attention more towards her hair dye company Good Dye Young and hosted the weekly BBC Sounds series Everything Is Emo. Farro continued his ongoing project HalfNoise, releasing an extended play – Flowerss (2018) – and two albums – Natural Disguise (2019) and Motif (2021). Farro also recorded drums for the songs "Watch Me While I Bloom" and "Crystal Clear" from Williams' Petals for Armor and released an EP under his own name titled Zafari (2020).

Discussions about a sixth Paramore album began in 2020 while Williams was promoting Petals for Armor. Williams hinted that the band's next album would be more guitar-driven, stating, "We've found ourselves listening to a lot of older music that we grew up being inspired by." She further commented on the sound of the album in 2022, likening it to Bloc Party: “From day one, Bloc Party was the number one reference because there was such an urgency to their sound that was different to the fast punk or the pop-punk or the like, loud wall of sound emo bands that were happening in the early 2000s.” In January 2022, the band confirmed they had entered the studio to work on their sixth album.

== Composition ==
This Is Why is the band's first album to have a title track. Logan Gourlay of Rock Sound called it a "jittery post-punk record" and noted Foals, Bloc Party and Talking Heads influences. George Griffiths of the Official Charts Company described the album as a "confidently jagged, hard post-punk soundscape." Meredith Jenks and Christine Werthman of Billboard have described the album as "a tight, post-punk juggernaut that zeroes in on pandemic-fueled anxieties". Similarly, Arielle Gordon from Pitchfork characterized the album as "jittery, crackling post-punk." Andrew Sacher at BrooklynVegan claimed the album has "twitchy" dance-punk "all over [it]." Wesley McLean of Exclaim considered the album to be "deeply rooted in post-punk and art punk traditions."

According to Alexis Petridis of The Guardian, "[the album] stirs 00s alt-rock into the mix: the band have mentioned Bloc Party and Foals as influences." Ims Taylor of Clash stated that "Paramore opt for simple, striking, and forceful on This Is Why, keeping in that New Wave tradition of punchy phrases iterated and reiterated, through vivid guitar countermelodies, offbeat punctuation and pointed lyrical looping of lyrics that go beyond verse chorus verse chorus, searing each song's character into your mind indelibly." The Sydney Morning Herald noted that "the album’s last three tracks swirl around a dream-pop axis." According to Chris Thiessen of Under the Radar, "The back half of the album feels tonally different from the front, more personal and relational and coming closer to their pop-punk roots."

== Release and promotion ==
In September 2022, Paramore archived all posts on their official Instagram page and unveiled a new design for the website. The site featured a timeline of several dates throughout the month that would be updated each date. These dates saw the launch of the band's official Discord server, the announcement of new tour dates in Los Angeles and New York City, and video snippets of the band working on new material. On September 16, the band announced their first new single in four years, "This Is Why", which was released on September 28. The same day as the single's release, the band announced the album of the same name to be released on February 10, 2023. Paramore performed the single on The Tonight Show Starring Jimmy Fallon on November 4.

On December 8, 2022, the band released the second single, "The News". The third single, "C'est Comme Ça" was released on January 12. The band embarked on a brief tour beginning in October, including headlining slots at the Austin City Limits and When We Were Young festivals. On February 6, 2023, the band debuted the song "Running Out of Time" at their album release show in Nashville. On February 16, 2023, the band released a music video for the album's fourth single, "Running Out of Time". On March 1, 2024, a music video for "Thick Skull" was released.

== Critical reception ==
Professional ratings
Aggregate scores
Source	Rating
AnyDecentMusic?	8.4/10
Metacritic	85/100
Review scores
Source	Rating
AllMusic	4.5/5 stars
Clash	9/10
Evening Standard	4/5 stars
Exclaim!	9/10
The Guardian	4/5 stars
Kerrang!	4/5 stars
The Line of Best Fit	9/10
NME	5/5 stars
Pitchfork	6.3/10
The Sydney Morning Herald	4.5/5 stars

This Is Why received widespread acclaim upon release. The album holds a score of 85 out of 100 on review aggregator Metacritic, based on 20 critics' reviews, indicating "universal acclaim". Writing for AllMusic, Matt Collar wrote that the album "[pulls] the artistic and emotional threads of their career into a cohesive, ardent whole." Ims Taylor of Clash praised the songwriting stating, "It's a disservice...to call any Paramore album the 'most' anything...But something about the songwriting on This Is Why are undeniably the most something, Williams both elegant and sandpaper-coarse, depending on what is called for." Sarah Jamieson of DIY called the album "another bold and brilliant transformation for the trio" with a "real sense of self-assuredness" that is "Paramore's most ambitious record yet". Writing for Evening Standard, David Smyth felt that the album "ranges from volcanic energy to slower tracks that suggest an appealing maturity."

Wesley McLean of Exclaim! called it "a record deeply rooted in post-punk and art punk traditions", and "Paramore's most mature release to date." Alexis Petridis of The Guardian wrote that on the album, "the agitated drumming and angular guitars meld with the big riffs and stop-start dynamics of pop-punk and an acute understanding of pop songcraft", concluding that it "tackles millennial malaise really well and realistically". Writing for Kerrang!, Sam Law opined that "the songwriting of these 10 tracks feel like a natural evolution" from the songs on After Laughter: "slightly older, slightly wiser, quite a lot more outraged at the state of the world". Law felt that Williams "tap[s] into the heightened version of her real persona" on This Is Why and commented that it is "remarkable how distinctly Paramore this still sounds". According to Steven Loftin writing for The Line of Best Fit, "Like all good jangling indie bops, beneath the fluctuations of chipper notes swims a dark underbelly, and This Is Why relishes in this fact."

Reviewing the album for NME, Sophie Williams found it to be "as in tune with the textures of today's forward-thinking rock as much as it is a love letter to Paramore's brilliantly caustic early days", with "some of their most fearless songwriting to date" and the band having "uncovered a new warmth". Arielle Gordon of Pitchfork wrote that "Instead of regurgitating the gnarled mall punk of their previous records", Paramore "reach for the propulsive sounds of post-punk" on the album, but found it to be "front-loaded with [...] lyrical missteps and ironies that would make Alanis Morissette roll her eyes" and the anger displayed in the lyrics "too lazy and too late". Giselle Au-Nhien Nguyen of The Sydney Morning Herald described the album as a "reintroduction to a band that's back with a new maturity and sense of purpose." Chris Thiessen of Under the Radar noted that the album "suffers slightly from front-loading imbalance" but still felt that the album was "well executed...and offers a glimpse into the ways we've all had to deal with the universal and the particular simultaneously in these last few years."

In June 2023, Alternative Press published an unranked list of the top 25 albums of the year to date and included this release, calling it "anything but reserved" as the band "boldly and artfully dig into politics, discomfort, and mental health while finding a funkier, more complex musical canvas with which to explore and express themselves freely". In December 2023, NME ranked the album as the fifth-best of the year.

=== Accolades ===
Association	Year	Nominated work	Category	Result
Grammy Awards	2024	This Is Why	Best Rock Album	Won
Grammy Awards	2024	"This Is Why"	Best Alternative Music Performance	Won

== Track listing ==
All tracks are written by Hayley Williams, Taylor York, and Zac Farro.

No.	Title	Length
1.	"This Is Why"	3:27
2.	"The News"	3:07
3.	"Running Out of Time"	3:12
4.	"C'est Comme Ça"	2:29
5.	"Big Man, Little Dignity"	4:20
6.	"You First"	4:05
7.	"Figure 8"	3:24
8.	"Liar"	4:21
9.	"Crave"	3:55
10.	"Thick Skull"	3:52
Total length:		36:12

== Personnel ==
Credits retrieved from album's liner notes.

=== Paramore ===
- Hayley Williams – vocals, percussion, piano, recording (all tracks), backing vocals on "This Is Why"
- Taylor York – guitars, keyboards, programming, vibraphone, glockenspiel, recording (all tracks), backing vocals on "This Is Why"
- Zac Farro – drums, percussion, keyboards, programming, vibraphone, glockenspiel, recording (all tracks), backing vocals on "This Is Why" and "Running Out of Time"

=== Additional musicians ===
- Carlos de la Garza – production (all tracks), backing vocals on "This Is Why"
- Brian Robert Jones – bass guitar
- Henry Solomon – bass clarinet, clarinet, flute, alto flute
- Phil Danyew – keyboards, programming
- Elke – backing vocals on "Big Man, Little Dignity"

=== Technical ===
- Emerson Mancini – mastering
- Manny Marroquin – mixing
- Harriet Tam – engineering
- Zach Pereya – mixing assistance
- Anthony Vilchis – mixing assistance
- Trey Station – mixing assistance
- Scott Moore – engineering assistance
- Kyle McAulay – engineering assistance
- Patrick Kehrier – engineering assistance
- Joey Mullen – drum technician
- Erik Bailey – guitar technician
- Joanne Almeida – guitar technician

=== Artwork ===
- Iamsound – art direction
- Zachary Gray – photography
- Fisk – graphic design

== Re: This Is Why ==
Re: This Is Why

Remix album by Paramore
- Released: October 6, 2023
- Recorded: 2022–2023
- Length: 47:52
- Label: Atlantic
- Producer: Carlos de la Garza; Jimmy Smith; Panda Bear; Zane Lowe; Chloe Kraemer; Domi and JD Beck; Remi Wolf; Solomonophonic; Bartees Strange; Chris Connors; Romy; Claud; Bram Inscore; Julien Baker; Calvin Lauber; Taylor York; Jack Antonoff

Paramore chronology
This Is Why (2023)	Re: This Is Why (2023)

Re: This Is Why is the first remix album by American rock band Paramore, released on October 6, 2023. Described as "almost a remix album", Re: This Is Why features reworked, remixed, and rewritten versions of songs from the band's 2023 album This Is Why, as well as an unreleased demo from the After Laughter recording sessions. It is the band's final release on Atlantic Records and before their indefinite hiatus.

Paramore began teasing Re: This Is Why in late September 2023, posting audio snippets from the album on their official Discord server. The album was officially announced on October 2.

In an interview at The New Yorker Festival, the band teased towards a collaboration with David Byrne that was not included on the album. This was later revealed to be a cover of the band's 2017 single "Hard Times" performed by Byrne, released in April 2024.

=== Track listing ===
All tracks are written by Hayley Williams, Taylor York, and Zac Farro. Additional writers are listed below.

Re: This Is Why track listing
No.	Title	Writer(s)	Producer(s)	Length
1.	"This Is Why" (Re: Foals)	Jimmy Smith	Smith	5:52
2.	"The News" (Re: The Linda Lindas)	Bela Salazar; Eloise Wong; Lucia de la Garza; Mila de la Garza; Carlos de la Garza	C. De la Garza	3:26
3.	"Running Out of Time" (Re: Panda Bear)	Noah Lennox	Panda Bear	4:24
4.	"Running Out of Time" (Re: Zane Lowe)	Zane Lowe	Lowe	4:45
5.	"C'est Comme Ça" (Re: Wet Leg)	Rhian Teasdale; Hester Chambers	Chloe Kraemer	2:25
6.	"Big Man, Little Dignity" (Re: Domi and JD Beck)	Domitille Degall; James Denis Beck	Domi and JD Beck	3:00
7.	"You First" (Re: Remi Wolf)	Wolf; Jared Solomon	Wolf; Solomonophonic	3:54
8.	"Figure 8" (Re: Bartees Strange)	Bartees Cox Jr.; Chris Connors	Strange; Connors	3:36
9.	"Liar" (Re: Romy)	Romy Madley Croft	Romy; Francine Perry (Note: Signifies an additional producer.)	4:37
10.	"Crave" (Re: Claud)	Claud Mintz	Claud; Bram Inscore	3:30
11.	"Thick Skull" (Re: Julien Baker)	Baker	Julien Baker; Calvin Lauber	4:54
12.	"Sanity" (demo)		York	3:31
Total length:				47:59

Additional track reissue
No.	Title	Writer(s)	Producer(s)	Length
12.	"Sanity" (Re: Jack Antonoff)	Jack Antonoff	Antonoff; C. De la Garza	3:27
13.	"Sanity" (demo)		York	3:31
Total length:				51:26

== Charts ==
=== Weekly charts ===
Weekly chart performance for This Is Why
Chart (2023)	Peak position
Australian Albums (ARIA)	1
Austrian Albums (Ö3 Austria)	16
Belgian Albums (Ultratop Flanders)	12
Belgian Albums (Ultratop Wallonia)	80
Canadian Albums (Billboard)	8
Croatian International Albums (HDU)	6
Dutch Albums (Album Top 100)	22
Finnish Albums (Suomen virallinen lista)	20
French Albums (SNEP)	107
German Albums (Offizielle Top 100)	6
Hungarian Albums (MAHASZ)	5
Irish Albums (OCC)	2
Japanese Hot Albums (Billboard Japan)	100
Japanese Rock Albums (Oricon)	16
Japanese Western Albums (Oricon)	27
Lithuanian Albums (AGATA)	70
New Zealand Albums (RMNZ)	3
Portuguese Albums (AFP)	9
Scottish Albums (OCC)	1
Spanish Albums (Promusicae)	32
Swiss Albums (Schweizer Hitparade)	32
UK Albums (OCC)	1
Uruguayan Albums (CUD)	8
US Billboard 200	2
US Top Alternative Albums (Billboard)	1
US Top Rock Albums (Billboard)	1

Weekly chart performance for Re: This Is Why
Chart (2024)	Peak position
Hungarian Physical Albums (MAHASZ)	14
Scottish Albums (OCC)	64

=== Year-end charts ===
Year-end chart performance for This Is Why
Chart (2023)	Position
US Top Album Sales (Billboard)	61
US Top Current Album Sales (Billboard)	37
US Top Rock Albums (Billboard)	62
US Top Alternative Albums (Billboard)	33

== Certifications ==
Certifications for This Is Why
Region	Certification	Certified units/sales
United Kingdom (BPI)	Silver	60,000^{‡}
^{‡} Sales+streaming figures based on certification alone.

== Release history ==
Release dates and formats for This Is Why
Region	Date	Format(s)	Version	Label	Ref.
Various	February 10, 2023	Cassette; CD; digital download; streaming; vinyl LP	Standard	Atlantic	
Various	October 6, 2023	Digital download; streaming	Re: This Is Why	Atlantic	
Various	April 20, 2024	Vinyl LP	Re: This Is Why	Atlantic	
