= Wilt (American band) =

American alternative rock band

- Wilt playing at The Wiltern

Background information
- Origin: Los Angeles, California, U.S.
- Genres: Alternative rock; grunge; indie rock
- Years active: 2022–present
- Label: AWAL
- Members: Chelsea Rifkin; Aaron Liebman; Andrew Vance; Dan Bermudez
- Past members: Jake Shpiner
- Website: wiltband.com

Wilt (stylized wilt) is an American alternative rock band from Los Angeles, California. The band consists of vocalist Chelsea Rifkin, guitarists Aaron Liebman and Andrew Vance, and drummer Dan Bermudez. After building an audience through social media, the band released a self-titled EP in 2024 and signed to AWAL. Their debut studio album, when no one's watching, produced by Carlos de la Garza was released on October 2, 2026.

== History ==
=== Formation and early singles (2022–2023) ===
wilt began as a bedroom-pop project of Rifkin and Liebman, becoming a full band with the addition of Vance and Bermudez in 2022. The band's name comes from a lyric in Hole's "Celebrity Skin".

The band released their debut single, "gwen", in late 2022, followed in 2023 by "nothing special", "puberty", "moved along", and "the riff".

On May 3, 2023, wilt announced that they would be supporting the band Lovejoy during the Across The Pond Tour on four dates, Portland, OR, Seattle, WA, Salt Lake City, UT, and Denver, CO.

=== Self-titled EP and touring (2024–2025) ===
wilt released their self-titled debut EP on April 5, 2024. Earlier that year the band supported Remo Drive on a 23 city U.S. tour. In May 2024, they performed at their first festival, Shabang in San Luis Obispo, followed by opening dates for The Warning's Keep Me Fed tour.

In 2025, wilt celebrated the one year anniversary of their self-titled EP by releasing it on vinyl and CD, featuring their standalone singles and a bonus track that is exclusive to the vinyl & CD release. The band also announced their first headline shows in the Pacific Northwest. The tour started in Portland, OR on August 7, 2025, at Polaris Hall and ended August 31 in Brooklyn, NY at Baby's All Right. On August 13, 2025, the wilt released the double single "bad seed / without you". In September, the band announced that in November they would be the direct support act on Taylor Acorn's North American headline tour.

=== when no one's watching (2026–present) ===
In 2026, wilt signed to AWAL and began working with producer Carlos de la Garza, known for his work with Paramore and the Linda Lindas. The first single, "nothing good to cry about", was released on May 29, 2026, followed by "bundy" on July 14.

On August 14 the band announced when no one's watching and released the single "dent" with a music video directed by Ambar Navarro. A fourth single, "suffocate", followed on September 23. The album was released on October 2, 2026, through AWAL. Rifkin has said that this album is the "wiltiest" they have sounded and that "This is our North Star album. We really found our sound, and I think it's very evident through the songs on this album."

From August to October 2026 the band supported Jutes on his North American tour. In September 2026 The Warning announced wilt as the opening act for the U.S. and Canadian leg of its 2027 Everything's Falling World Tour.

== Musical style ==
wilt's music has been described as alternative rock drawing on grunge, shoegaze and emo. The band has cited Nirvana, Radiohead, Slow Pulp and Hole as influences.

== Members ==
Current

- Chelsea Rifkin – lead vocals (2022–present)
- Aaron Liebman – guitar (2022–present)
- Andrew Vance – guitar (2022–present) (Note: Credited as Andrew Perrea on the band's early releases.)
- Dan Bermudez – drums (2022–present)

Past

- Jake Shpiner – bass (2023–25)

== Discography ==
=== Extended plays ===
Title	Details	Track listing	
when no one's watching	Released: October 2, 2026; Label: AWAL; Formats: Digital download, streaming	"dent" "bundy" "destroy you" "nothing good to cry about" "closure" "suffocate" "trigger" "don't run away again" "rats" "bitter, burned" "when no one's watching"	
wilt	Released: April 5, 2024; Label: Self-released; Formats: Digital download, streaming		Credited as Andrew Perrea on wilt's early releases

=== Singles ===
Year	Title	Release
2022	"gwen"	Non-album singles (Note: Later included on the expanded edition Wilt (Deluxe) (2024).)
2023	"nothing special"	Non-album singles
2023	"puberty"	Non-album singles
2023	"moved along"	Non-album singles
2023	"the riff"	Non-album singles
2024	"you're the one to blame"	wilt
2024	"bite my tongue"	wilt
2025	"bad seed / without you"	Non-album singles
2026	"dent"	when no one's watching
2026	"bundy"	when no one's watching
2026	"nothing good to cry about"	when no one's watching
2026	"suffocate"	when no one's watching
