= This Is Why (song) =

Single by Paramore

from the album This Is Why
- Released: September 28, 2022
- Genre: Post-punk revival; dance-punk; art-punk; indie pop; pop-punk
- Length: 3:27
- Label: Atlantic
- Songwriters: Hayley Williams; Taylor York; Zac Farro
- Producer: Carlos de la Garza

Paramore singles chronology
"Caught in the Middle" (2018)	"This Is Why" (2022)	"The News" (2022)

Music video
- "This Is Why" on YouTube

"This Is Why" is a song by American rock band Paramore, released as the lead single from their sixth studio album of the same name, on September 28, 2022. It was written by Hayley Williams, Taylor York, and Zac Farro and produced by Carlos de la Garza. The song was accompanied by its music video, released the same day.

The song won the Grammy Award for Best Alternative Music Performance.

== Background ==
"This Is Why" was released on September 28, 2022. It was the last song written for the album, at which point Williams was "tired of writing lyrics", although guitarist Taylor York convinced Williams and drummer Zac Farro to work on one "last idea". Williams stated that it "summarizes the plethora of ridiculous emotions, the rollercoaster of being alive in 2022, having survived even just the last three or four years" and thought that following the COVID-19 pandemic and "the impending doom of a dying planet", "that humans would have found it deep within themselves to be kinder or more empathetic or something".

== Composition ==
"This Is Why" has been described as post-punk, post-punk revival, art-punk, dance-punk, pop punk, indie pop, and alternative rock. This song is said to also incorporate influences from funk, soul, and dance. It is the band's first title track.

== Critical reception ==
Professional ratings
Review scores
Source	Rating
NME	4/5 stars

Quinn Moreland of Pitchfork wrote that the track "builds on the funky pop that colored 2017's After Laughter, but shifts away from its predecessor's bright gloss for something muddier and vaguely threatening" and called the chorus "spiky" with instrumentation from marimbas making for a "suspense[ful]" bridge, after which "the song creeps forward, ultimately never pulling itself out of its paranoid spiral". Ali Shutler of NME described it as a "snarling, defiant middle finger to the haters" and a "giddy statement of purpose" with "newfound urgency to the party-starting music that takes influence from their angsty days as scrappy pop-punkers" accompanied by a "disco stomp". Steffanee Wang of Nylon called it a "disillusioned anthem" as well as "explosive" and remarked that it "sonically fits in the neat in-between space between [the band's] older pop-punk stuff and the electronic contemporary sound of 2017's After Laughter".

=== Accolades ===
Awards and nominations for "This Is Why"
Organization	Year	Category	Result	Ref.
MTV Video Music Awards	2023	Best Alternative	Nominated	
Grammy Awards	2024	Best Alternative Music Performance	Won	

Year-end accolades for "This Is Why"
Publication	Accolade	Rank	Ref.
Consequence	Top 50 Songs of 2022	1	
NME	The 50 Best Songs of 2022	2	
Nylon	Favourite Songs of 2022	–	
BBC Radio 1	Hottest Record of the Year 2022	1	

== Music video ==
The music video was released the same day as the song, and was directed by Brendan Yates of the American punk band Turnstile and filmed in Malibu, California. It depicts the band performing and "frolick[ing ...] in the Malibu wilderness, amid the grasses, against the blue sky, and [...] in the spare interiors of a house".

The music video for the band's song "Thick Skull" served as a direct continuation of the video, with Yates returning to direct.

== Personnel ==
- Hayley Williams – vocals, backing vocals, percussion, piano
- Taylor York – guitar, keyboards, programming, glockenspiel, vibraphone, backing vocals
- Zac Farro – drums, percussion, keyboards, programming, vibraphone, glockenspiel, backing vocals
- Carlos de la Garza – production, backing vocals
- Brian Robert Jones – bass guitar
- Henry Solomon – bass clarinet, clarinet, flute
- Phil Danyew – glockenspiel, keyboards, programming
- Em Mancini – mastering
- Manny Marroquin – mixing
- Harriet Tam – engineering
- Kyle McAulay – engineering assistance
- Patrick Kehrier – engineering assistance
- Scott Moore – engineering assistance
- Joey Mullen – drum technician
- Erik Bailey – guitar technician
- Joanne Almeida – guitar technician

== Charts ==
=== Weekly charts ===
Weekly chart performance for "This Is Why"
Chart (2022–2023)	Peak position
Canada Rock (Billboard)	25
Germany Rock Airplay (GfK)	9
Ireland (IRMA)	90
New Zealand Hot Singles (RMNZ)	8
UK Singles (OCC)	61
US Bubbling Under Hot 100 (Billboard)	8
US Hot Rock & Alternative Songs (Billboard)	15
US Rock & Alternative Airplay (Billboard)	3

=== Year-end charts ===
Year-end chart performance for "This Is Why"
Chart (2023)	Position
US Rock & Alternative Airplay (Billboard)	21

== Certifications ==
Certifications for "This Is Why"
Region	Certification	Certified units/sales
United States (RIAA)	Gold	500,000^{‡}
^{‡} Sales+streaming figures based on certification alone.

== Release history ==
Release dates and formats for "This Is Why"
Region	Date	Format(s)	Label	Ref.
Various	September 28, 2022	Digital download; streaming	Atlantic	
United States	October 4, 2022	Alternative radio	Atlantic	
United States	November 7, 2022	Adult alternative radio	Atlantic	
