= Danyew (EP) =

EP by Danyew
- Released: April 21, 2009
- Genres: Contemporary Christian music, Christian rock, electronica
- Length: 22:15
- Label: Sparrow
- Producer: Pete Kipley

Danyew chronology
The EP (2009)	Danyew (2009)	Wake Up (2009)

Danyew is the second extended play (EP) from Danyew. Sparrow Records released the EP on April 21, 2009. Danyew worked with Pete Kipley, in the production of this album.

== Critical reception ==
Professional ratings
Review scores
Source	Rating
AllMusic	3.5/5 stars
Cross Rhythms	9/10 squares
Jesus Freak Hideout	4/5 stars

Awarding the EP three and a half stars for AllMusic, Jared Johnson writes, "There are no gimmicks on this record, only the solid craftsmanship of a talented artist." Mike Rimmer, rating the album a nine out of ten at Cross Rhythms, says, "The [multi]-instrumentalist and singer seems content to use the studio as a laboratory to distil his music into something that is lyrically, musically and emotionally powerful." Giving the album four stars from Jesus Freak Hideout, Jen Rose states, "Every song presents a unique facet to his different styles, every part fitting together into a seamless whole."

== Track listing ==
All tracks are written by Phil Danyew.

No.	Title	Length
1.	"The Closer We Are"	3:48
2.	"Street Light"	3:29
3.	"Close Your Eyes"	4:16
4.	"Beautiful King"	4:09
5.	"Nothing without You"	3:04
6.	"Turnstile"	3:28
Total length:		22:15
