= The News (song) =

Single by Paramore

from the album This Is Why
- Released: December 8, 2022
- Genre: Post-punk; alternative rock; math rock
- Length: 3:07
- Label: Atlantic
- Songwriters: Hayley Williams; Taylor York; Zac Farro
- Producer: Carlos de la Garza

Paramore singles chronology
"This Is Why" (2022)	"The News" (2022)	"C'est Comme Ça" (2023)

Music video
- "The News" on YouTube

"The News" is a song by American rock band Paramore, released as the second single from their sixth studio album This Is Why on December 8, 2022. It was written by the band and produced by Carlos de la Garza. The song was accompanied by its music video, released the same day.

== Background ==
"The News" was released on December 8, 2022. According to Williams, "'The News' is one of those songs that came together pretty quickly and felt exciting from the start. It feels like a happy medium between classic Paramore angst and bringing in some influences we've always had but never exploited...watching Zac track drums for this one was one of my favorite memories from the studio."

The song was later remixed by the Linda Lindas as a part of Paramore's remix album, Re: This Is Why.

== Composition ==
"The News" is a post-punk, alternative rock, and math rock song. According to Loudwire, "the song...is a more driving, upbeat rocker within the verses, but pulls back to deliver a more hypnotic...chorus".

== Music video ==
The music video was released the same day as the song and was directed by Mike Kluge and Matthew DeLisi.

== Personnel ==
- Hayley Williams – vocals
- Taylor York – guitar
- Zac Farro – drums, percussion

== Charts ==
Chart performance for "The News"
Chart (2022)	Peak position
Germany Rock Airplay (GfK)	11
New Zealand Hot Singles (RMNZ)	33
UK Physical Singles (OCC)	9
US Hot Rock & Alternative Songs (Billboard)	34
