= Hunny (band) =

American rock band

- Origin: Newbury Park, California, U.S.
- Genres: Indie rock; new wave; post-punk
- Years active: 2014–present
- Label: Epitaph
- Members: Jason Yarger
- Past members: Jake Munk; Gregory Horne; Jake Goldstein; Kevin Grimmett; Joey Anderson
- Website: hunnytheband.co

Hunny (stylized as HUNNY) is an American rock band from Newbury Park, California that formed in 2014. The band currently runs as a solo project of frontman Jason Yarger.

== History ==
Before Hunny formed, the members had been in multiple bands around the local area (notably with other members of Bad Suns and The Neighbourhood). They decided to join forces and form Hunny in 2014.

On June 17, 2014, the band released their first single "Honey Blonde" onto SoundCloud and Bandcamp, but was removed later on. The song has since been reuploaded to YouTube.

Their second single, "Cry For Me", was released in January 2015 and became a breakthrough hit, gaining over 1 million streams within a year.

On October 9, 2015, they released their debut EP, Pain / Ache / Loving.

In 2016, Hunny released the singles "Vowels (and The Importance of Being Me)" and "Colder Parts". Guitarist Jake Munk left the band in December 2016.

In May 2017, Hunny released their second EP Windows I.

In early 2018, bassist Gregory Horne left the band.

Hunny signed to Epitaph Records in July 2018, before releasing their third EP Windows II.

On July 19, 2019, Hunny released their first full-length album, Yes. Yes. Yes. Yes. Yes. Hunny worked with producer Carlos de la Garza on the album. Following the album's release, Hunny toured internationally, including tours with State Champs, Citizen and The Story So Far.

In 2020, during the COVID-19 pandemic, the members of Hunny worked separately on material for their second studio album, writing and demoing nearly 100 song ideas.

In 2021, Hunny released three standalone singles, "Sports with Strangers", "Xbox Luvr", and "Daydreams / Heartbreaks", mixed and mastered by producer Beau Hill.

On July 22, 2022, Hunny released the EP Homesick, followed by the expanded Homesick (Deluxe EP) on November 18, with former guitarist Jacob Munk mixing the EP.

The remaining material was subsequently developed with longtime collaborator Derek Ted at his Los Angeles studio, which was named New Planet Heaven and provided the title for the album.

Their second studio album, new planet heaven, was released on October 6, 2023. The album incorporated a variety of musical styles, including alternative rock, lo-fi punk, slacker pop and elements influenced by late-1990s rock. "Ring in Your Ear" features Justin Pierre of Motion City Soundtrack.

On September 26, 2025, Hunny released their third studio album, Spirit!. Unlike the band's previous albums, Spirit! was largely crafted by frontman Yarger following the departure of the other members, who stepped back after more than a decade with the band to focus on their lives outside of music. Yarger had initially planned to pursue a conventional solo career, but his former bandmates encouraged him to continue under the Hunny name. The album followed the 2025 single "Sidewaze" and features a punk-infused, eclectic indie rock sound, with tracks such as "Horse W / Curse" and "Somebody Else" recalling the band's earlier work.

== Band members ==
Current members

- Jason Yarger - lead vocalist, guitarist (2014–present)

Former members

- Jake Munk - guitarist (2014–2016)
- Gregory Horne - bassist (2014–2018)
- Kevin Grimmett - backup vocalist, keyboardist (2014–2025) bassist (2018–2025)
- Jake Goldstein - guitarist (2014–2025)
- Joey Anderson - drummer (2014–2025)

== Discography ==
Albums

- Yes. Yes. Yes. Yes. Yes. (2019)
- New Planet Heaven (2023)
- Spirit! (2025)

EPs

- Pain / Ache / Loving (2015)
- Windows I (2017)
- Windows II (2018)
- Homesick (2022)

Singles

- "Honey Blonde" (2014)
- "Vowels (and the Importance of Being Me)" (2016)
- "Colder Parts" (2016)
- "Sports with Strangers" (2021)
- "Xbox Luvr" (2021)
- "Daydreams / Heartbreaks" (2021)
- "Homesick" (slenderbodies remix) (2022)
- "Action → Reaction" (2023)
- "Big Star" (2023)
- "Solo" (2023)
- "Fortress" with Love Under The Sun (2023)
- "Sidewaze" (2025)
- "Catalina" (2025)
