= Kerrang! Award for Best Single =

British music award

Kerrang! Award for Best Song
- Country: United Kingdom
- Presented by: Kerrang!
- First award: 1995
- Currently held by: "Bring Me the Horizon" – "Die4U" (2022)

Highlights
- Most awards: Thirty Seconds to Mars (3)
- Most nominations: Slipknot (5)
- Website: awards.kerrang.com

The Kerrang! Award for Best Single is an honour presented at the Kerrang! Awards, an annual ceremony established in 1994 to recognise achievements in rock music. The award was first introduced in 1995 and renamed 'Best Song' for the 2018 ceremony onwards, but serves the same purpose. Like all Kerrang! Awards, the trophy awarded to the winning act is shaped in the style of the 'K' from the Kerrang! logo.

== Achievements ==
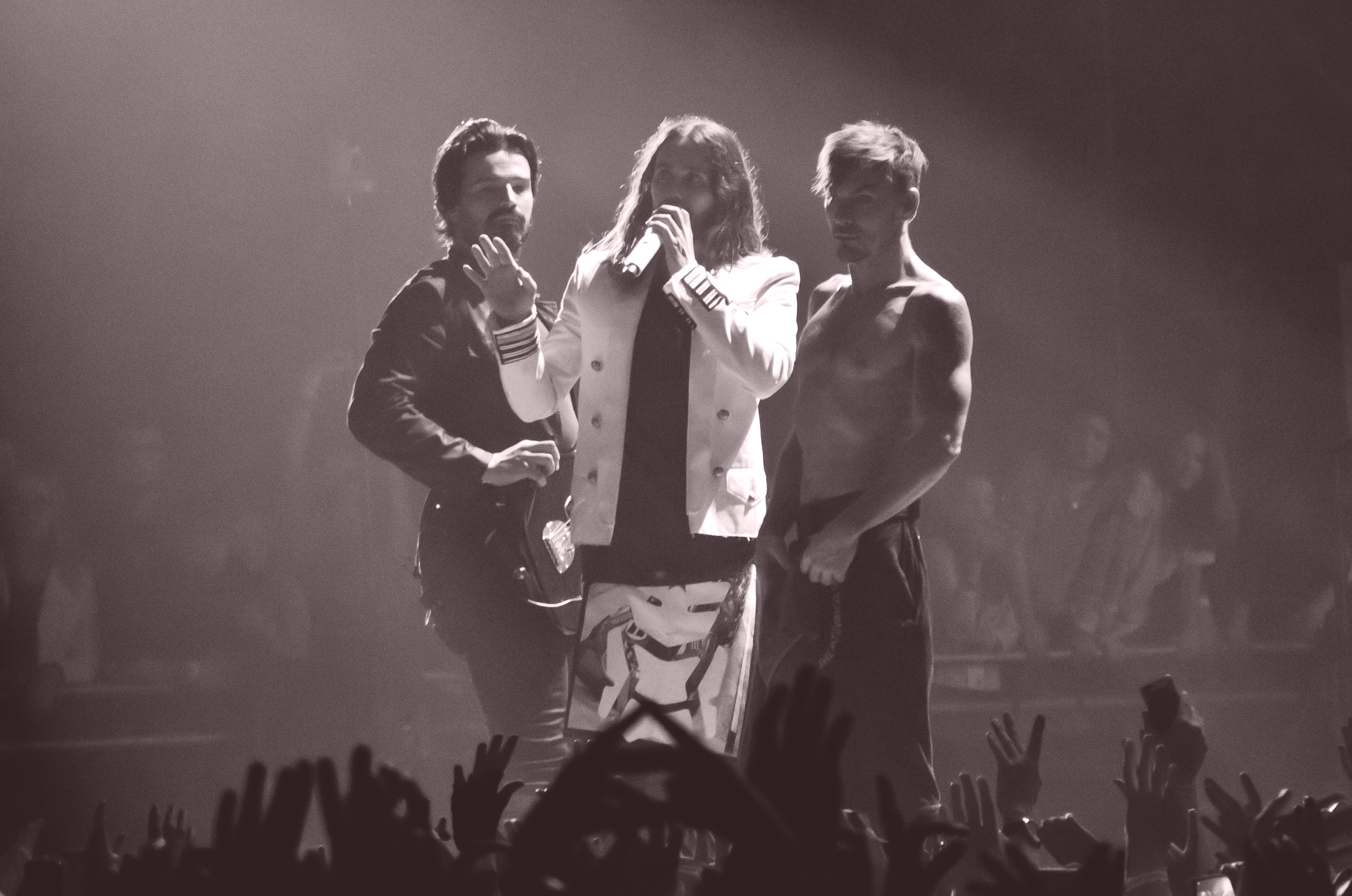
Thirty Seconds to Mars are three-time winners of the award.

Thirty Seconds to Mars holds the record for most wins at three ("The Kill", "From Yesterday", "Hurricane"). The band was also the first artist to win Best Single in two consecutive years for the years 2007 ("The Kill") and 2008 ("From Yesterday") and have successfully won the award each time they have been nominated.

As of 2019, Slipknot hold the record for most nominations with a total of five, including two nominations in the same year at the 2009 Kerrang! Awards.

== Recipients ==
| Year | Recipient(s) | Work | Nominees | Ref. |
|---|---|---|---|---|
| 1995 | Reef | "Naked" | The Wildhearts — "I wanna Go Where The People Go"; Bon Jovi — "Always"; Terrorvision — "Alice, What's the Matter"; Offspring — "Self Esteem" | |
| 1996 | Dog Eat Dog | "No Fronts" | | |
| 1997 | Reef | "Place Your Hands" | | |
| 1998 | The Mighty Mighty Bosstones | "The Impression That I Get" | | |
| 1999 | Terrorvision | "Tequila" | | |
| 2000 | Slipknot | "Wait and Bleed" | | |
| 2001 | OPM | "Heaven Is a Halfpipe" | Limp Bizkit — "My Way"; Raging Speedhorn — "The Gush"; Papa Roach — "Last Resort"; Weezer — "Hash Pipe" | |
| 2002 | Puddle of Mudd | "Blurry" | The Hives — "Hate to Say I Told You So"; Korn — "Here to Stay"; Marilyn Manson — "Tainted Love"; Nickelback — "How You Remind Me" | |
| 2003 | Good Charlotte | "Lifestyles of the Rich and Famous" | Electric Six — "Gay Bar"; Evanescence — "Bring Me to Life"; Foo Fighters — "All My Life"; Linkin Park — "Faint" | |
| 2004 | Lostprophets | "Last Train Home" | Ash — "Orpheus"; The Distillers — "Drain the Blood"; Evanescence — "Going Under"; HIM — "Funeral of Hearts"; Linkin Park — "Breaking the Habit"; The Rasmus — "In the Shadows" | |
| 2005 | Foo Fighters | "Best of You" | Green Day — "American Idiot"; My Chemical Romance — "I'm Not Okay (I Promise)"; Nightwish — "Nemo"; System of a Down — "B.Y.O.B." | |
| 2006 | Bullet for My Valentine | "Tears Don't Fall" | Fall Out Boy — "Sugar, We're Goin Down"; Lostprophets — "Rooftops"; Muse — "Supermassive Black Hole"; Placebo — "Infra-Red"; Trivium — "Dying in Your Arms" | |
| 2007 | Thirty Seconds to Mars | "The Kill" | AFI — "Miss Murder"; Enter Shikari — "Sorry You're Not a Winner"; Funeral for a Friend — "Into Oblivion"; My Chemical Romance — "Welcome to the Black Parade" | |
| 2008 | Thirty Seconds to Mars | "From Yesterday" | Bullet for My Valentine — "Waking the Demon"; Kids in Glass Houses — "Give Me What I Want"; Pendulum — "Propane Nightmares"; Simple Plan — "Your Love Is a Lie" | |
| 2009 | The Prodigy | "Omen" | Metallica — "All Nightmare Long"; Placebo — "For What It's Worth"; Slipknot — "Dead Memories"; Slipknot — "Psychosocial" | |
| 2010 | You Me at Six | "Liquid Confidence" | Avenged Sevenfold — "Nightmare"; The Blackout — "Save Our Selves (The Warning)"; Four Year Strong — "Wasting Time (Eternal Summer)"; Slipknot — "Snuff" | |
| 2011 | Thirty Seconds to Mars | "Hurricane" | Bring Me the Horizon — "Blessed with a Curse"; Bullet for My Valentine — "Your Betrayal"; My Chemical Romance — "Planetary (Go!)"; Panic! at the Disco — "The Ballad of Mona Lisa" | |
| 2012 | Black Veil Brides | "Rebel Love Song" | Falling in Reverse — "The Drug in Me Is You"; You Me at Six — "No One Does it Better"; You Me at Six (featuring Oli Sykes) — "Bite My Tongue"; Young Guns — "Bones" | |
| 2013 | Fall Out Boy | "The Phoenix" | Bring Me the Horizon — "Shadow Moses"; Fall Out Boy — "My Songs Know What You Did in the Dark (Light Em Up)"; Paramore — "Now"; Pierce the Veil (featuring Kellin Quinn) — "King for a Day" | |
| 2014 | You Me at Six | "Fresh Start Fever" | All Time Low (featuring Vic Fuentes) — "A Love Like War"; My Chemical Romance — "Fake Your Death"; Of Mice & Men — "You're Not Alone"; We Are the In Crowd — "The Best Thing (That Never Happened)" | |
| 2015 | Enter Shikari | "Anaesthetist" | All Time Low — "Kids in the Dark"; Bring Me the Horizon — "Drown"; Fall Out Boy — "Centuries"; Young Guns — "Speaking in Tongues" | |
| 2016 | All Time Low | "Missing You" | Against the Current — "Running with the Wild Things"; Architects — "A Match Made in Heaven"; Moose Blood — "Honey"; Panic! at the Disco — "Emperor's New Clothes" | |
| 2018 | Neck Deep | "In Bloom" | Architects — "Doomsday"; Marilyn Manson — "Kill4Me"; Marmozets — "Major System Error"; Mike Shinoda — "Crossing a Line" | |
| 2019 | Fever 333 | "Burn It" | Frank Iero — "Young and Doomed"; Rammstein — "Deutschland"; Slipknot — "All Out Life"; While She Sleeps — "Anti-Social" | |
| 2022 | Bring Me the Horizon | "Die4U" | Fever 333 — "The Innocent"; The Linda Lindas — "Racist, Sexist Boy"; Rammstein — "Zeit"; The Regrettes — "Monday" | |

== See also ==
- List of Kerrang! Award winners
