= Bacchae (band) =

American punk rock band

- Origin: Washington, D.C.
- Genres: Punk rock
- Years active: 2016–2024
- Labels: Get Better Records
- Members: Katie McD; Rena Hagins; Eileen O'Grady; Andrew Breiner

Bacchae were an American punk rock band from Washington, D.C. The band took their name from the ancient Greek tragedy, The Bacchae. The band has been compared to The B-52's and The Cure.

Formed in 2016, Bacchae self-released their debut album, Down the Drain in 2017. The Philadelphia label Get Better Records released Bacchae's follow-up self-titled EP in 2018, as well as their subsequent albums Pleasure Vision (2020) and Next Time (2024).

Bacchae announced their breakup via Instagram on September 6, 2024.

== Discography ==
- Down the Drain (2017)
- Bacchae EP (2018)
- Pleasure Vision (2020)
- Next Time (2024)
