= Racist, Sexist Boy =

2021 single by the Linda Lindas

Single by the Linda Lindas
- Released: May 27, 2021
- Recorded: May 4, 2021
- Venue: Los Angeles Public Library
- Genre: Punk rock; riot grrrl
- Length: 2:05
- Label: Epitaph
- Songwriter: Mila de la Garza · Eloise Wong
- Producer: Carlos de la Garza

The Linda Lindas singles chronology
"Vote!" (2020)	"Racist, Sexist Boy" (2021)	"Oh!" (2021)

Music video
- "Racist, Sexist Boy" (Live at LA Public Library) on YouTube

"Racist, Sexist Boy"

Song by the Linda Lindas

from the album Growing Up
- Released: April 8, 2022
- Studio: Music Friends, Los Angeles
- Genre: Punk rock; riot grrrl
- Length: 1:49
- Label: Epitaph
- Songwriter: Mila de la Garza · Eloise Wong
- Producer: Carlos de la Garza

"Racist, Sexist Boy", originally "Idiotic Boy", is an anti-racist song by American rock band the Linda Lindas. It is the final track from the band's debut album, Growing Up (2022), released on Epitaph Records. The song is about an experience Mila de la Garza, the band's drummer, had when a schoolmate made a racist comment at the beginning of the COVID-19 pandemic. Mila, along with the band's bassist Eloise Wong, wrote the song during a Zoom call.

A performance of the song at the Los Angeles Public Library gained media attention after a video was posted online. Multiple musicians praised the performance, including Tom Morello, Flea, Thurston Moore, Kathleen Hanna, and Kid Cudi. The Linda Lindas soon signed with Epitaph Records, though a deal had been in progress before the video went viral. "Racist, Sexist Boy" later won the award for Best Punk Record at the 2022 Libera Awards.

== Inspiration and writing ==
In March 2020, near the beginning of the COVID-19 pandemic, Mila de la Garza, the band's drummer, had what she described as her first experience of racism. She had an encounter with a boy at school who backed away from her upon discovering she was of Chinese heritage; he had been told by his father to stay away from Chinese people. Mila subsequently met with Eloise Wong, the band's bassist, on a five-hour Zoom call, during which they worked on writing "Racist, Sexist Boy". The chorus of the song came easily, and they decided to wait to finish writing the song until near the end of the US presidential election.

The song was originally titled "Idiotic Boy", however, the band subsequently learned about ableism and opted for a different message.

The song was to fight back against the racist, sexist boys, but we didn't want to be the racist, sexist boys, so we changed the words.

— Eloise Wong

== Recording and release ==
"Racist, Sexist Boy" was first recorded during a live performance in May 2021 at the Los Angeles Public Library. On May 22, Epitaph Records announced that it had signed the Linda Lindas, in a deal which they had been working on since before the video went viral. That live performance was released as a single by Epitaph on May 27.

Carlos de la Garza, father of band members Lucia and Mila de la Garza, recorded and mixed the studio version of "Racist, Sexist Boy" at Music Friends, his backyard studio. It appeared on the band's debut album, Growing Up, in April 2022.

== Musical style ==
"Racist, Sexist Boy" is classified as a punk rock song with elements of riot grrrl.

== Live performance ==
LA Public Library
(@LAPublicLibrary)
tweeted:

Don't mess with The Linda Lindas.

Watch the full concert: lapl.me/YQ2UH9o

May 20, 2021

On May 4, 2021, the Linda Lindas played at the Los Angeles Public Library for an AAPI Heritage Month celebration, during which they played "Racist, Sexist Boy". The library soon posted a video of the performance on its Twitter account. The video became a viral social media hit, earning praise from Rage Against the Machine's Tom Morello, Red Hot Chili Peppers's Flea, Thurston Moore, Bikini Kill's Kathleen Hanna, and Kid Cudi. Author Viet Thanh Nguyen praised the performance, saying, "'Racist, Sexist Boy' is the song we need now".

Guitarist Bela Salazar was the only band member who had a social media account at the time, so she had to relay the messages to the other members. She reported that thousands of people felt heard, and thought it was "pretty cool" to see the reaction.

== Accolades ==
"Racist, Sexist Boy" won Best Punk Record at the 2022 Libera Awards. It was also nominated for Best Song at the 2022 Kerrang! Awards.

== Personnel ==
Credits are adapted from the liner notes of Growing Up.

The Linda Lindas

- Bela Salazar – guitar
- Eloise Wong – bass, vocals
- Lucia de la Garza – guitar
- Mila de la Garza – drums, vocals

Technical personnel

- Carlos de la Garza – producer, engineer, mixer
- Dave Cooley – mastering
- Sergio Chavez – engineer
- Matt Maroalakos – engineer
- Alec Wingfield – engineer
