= Growing Up (The Linda Lindas album) =

2022 debut studio album by the Linda Lindas

Studio album by the Linda Lindas
- Released: April 8, 2022
- Recorded: June 11 – October 25, 2021
- Studios: Music Friends, Los Angeles
- Genres: Punk rock; pop-punk; power pop
- Length: 25:35
- Languages: English; Spanish; Japanese (bonus edition)
- Label: Epitaph
- Producer: Carlos de la Garza

The Linda Lindas chronology
The Linda Lindas (2020)	Growing Up (2022)	No Obligation (2024)

Singles from Growing Up
- 1. "Oh!" Released: July 21, 2021; 2. "Nino" Released: December 1, 2021; 3. "Growing Up" Released: February 1, 2022; 4. "Talking to Myself" Released: March 2, 2022

Growing Up is the debut studio album by American rock band the Linda Lindas. Epitaph Records released the album on April 8, 2022. It was produced by Carlos de la Garza, the father of band members Lucia and Mila de la Garza. Recording sessions for Growing Up took place at Music Friends in Los Angeles from June to October 2021. Growing Up is a punk rock album, with lyrics that focus on themes of growing up, discovering oneself, and anxieties that arise in adolescence. The album was written during the COVID-19 pandemic, limiting the band's ability to write together.

Growing Up received generally favorable reviews from critics and appeared on multiple 2022 year-end lists. The album peaked at number 19 on the US Top Album Sales chart by Billboard. It also charted internationally, peaking at number 49 on Japan's Oricon Albums Chart and number 4 on the UK Independent Album Breakers Chart. Skateboarder Ray Barbee and Bikini Kill singer Kathleen Hanna made cameos in the music videos for the four singles released from the album: "Oh!", "Nino", "Growing Up", and "Talking to Myself". To promote Growing Up, the Linda Lindas embarked on a tour in late 2022, performing with Japanese Breakfast, Bacchae, and Yeah Yeah Yeahs.

== Background ==
The Linda Lindas formed in 2018 as a part of a pickup band for Kristin Kontrol. The band's name comes from the 2005 Japanese film Linda Linda Linda, which was in turn named after the Blue Hearts's song "Linda Linda". The Linda Lindas consists of Bela Salazar (guitar), Eloise Wong (bass guitar), Lucia de la Garza (guitar), and Mila de la Garza (drums).

The Linda Lindas started out as a cover band, playing music from multiple bands such as the Go-Go's and Le Tigre. They independently released their debut extended play (EP), The Linda Lindas, in December 2020. The band subsequently released an EP containing covers of Bikini Kill's "Rebel Girl" and the Muffs' "Big Mouth".

In May 2021, the Los Angeles Public Library posted a video of the band playing their original song "Racist, Sexist Boy" at an Asian American and Pacific Islander Heritage Month event. The video became a viral social media hit, earning praise from Rage Against the Machine's Tom Morello, Red Hot Chili Peppers's Flea, Thurston Moore, Bikini Kill's Kathleen Hanna, and Kid Cudi. Author Viet Thanh Nguyen said "'Racist, Sexist Boy' is the song we need now". On May 22, Epitaph Records announced that it had signed the Linda Lindas in a deal which they had been working on since before the video went viral.

== Writing and recording ==
The Linda Lindas wrote most of Growing Up during the COVID-19 pandemic, during which the band members attended school remotely and were unable to see each other often. They stated that they felt relief writing about their "feelings of loneliness and confusion". Many of the songs were written by only one or two of the members, but the song "Oh!" was written by the band as a whole. Salazar described the pandemic as "super overwhelming", and noted that the band would wear masks and practice outside. She said that practicing "helped [her] mind to think about something else" and made it easier to put her emotions into a song.

In March 2020, near the beginning of the COVID-19 pandemic, Mila had what she described as her first experience of racism. She had an encounter with a boy at school who backed away from her upon discovering she was Chinese; he had been told by his father to stay away from Chinese people. Mila subsequently met with Wong on a five-hour Zoom call, during which they wrote "Racist, Sexist Boy".

Growing Up was recorded and mixed at Music Friends, Carlos de la Garza's backyard studio. Recording sessions lasted from June to October 2021.

== Composition ==
=== Lyrics ===
Growing Up consists of 10 original songs, as well as a cover of the Blue Hearts's Japanese-language song "Linda Linda" on the bonus edition. The Linda Lindas split songwriting duties, with each member contributing to the writing. The album is centered on themes of growing up, discovering oneself, and anxieties that arise in adolescence. At the time of its release, each band member was under 18. The first song, "Oh!", is about feeling unheard. Rolling Stone editor Lisa Tozzi says the title track "celebrates the intense friendships ... and simple pleasures of youth, but also nods to the very normal desire to speed through the scary and awkward parts of adolescence". The song "Talking to Myself" has been described as an "anxiety spiral", however, its lyrics express resilience against severe anxiety. Salazar wrote the song "Nino" about her cat because she believed that he was jealous of a song from the band's eponymous EP (2020) about her other cat, Monica. The Spanish-language "Cuántas Veces", while centered around feeling left out, also has a theme of acceptance. "Racist, Sexist Boy" is an anti-racist song.

=== Music ===
Growing Up's genre has been classified as punk rock, (Note: As discussed by Kerrang!'s Jake Richardson, Flood Magazine's Josh Hurst, and Exclaim!'s Alan Ranta.) pop-punk, and power pop. Critics have compared the album's sound—and particularly the song "Racist, Sexist Boy"—to riot grrrl. (Note: As discussed by Alternative Press's Augusta Battoclette, Consequence of Sound's Wren Graves, The Washington Post's Derek Hawkins, and Exclaim!'s Allie Gregory.) For example, The Skinny editor Tony Inglis wrote that the album "channel[s] riot grrrl fury and [...] catchy garage pop melodies". The opening track, "Oh!", has been compared musically to the soundtrack of the film Josie and the Pussycats (2001), as well as Joan Jett and Ramones. The song "Nino" contains elements of power pop and is similar to the music of La Luz and Blondie. "Cuántas Veces" has been noted for its bossa nova influences.

== Packaging ==
The Linda Lindas (L-R): Lucia de la Garza, Eloise Wong, Mila de la Garza, and Salazar

The album cover is a photograph of paper dolls designed by Wong; she cut the dolls freehand, intending for them to represent the band members as cats. The photograph was taken by photographer Zen Sekizawa, a friend of the band, who focused on creating appropriate lighting for the dolls. Cutouts resembling those on the album cover are included as an insert for the vinyl pressings of the album.

== Release and promotion ==
=== Singles and music videos ===
Growing Up was released on April 8, 2022, by Epitaph Records. The album had four singles: "Oh!", "Nino", "Growing Up", and "Talking to Myself". "Oh!" was released as a single preceding the album on July 21, 2021. Its music video was directed by Ryan Baxley and featured skateboarder Ray Barbee taking pictures of the Linda Lindas using a Polaroid camera. The second single, "Nino", was released on December 1, 2021. The storyboard was created by Salazar and it was animated by Rob Fidel. It features Nino, Salazar's pet Siamese cat, hunting in the desert. "Growing Up" and "Talking to Myself" followed as the third and fourth singles on February 1 and March 2, 2022, respectively. Fashion designer Humberto Leon directed the music video for "Growing Up", which features the band playing dress-up. The music video for "Talking to Myself", also directed by Baxley, was inspired by The Twilight Zone episode "Living Doll" and features the band's doll collection. "Why" had a music video release on May 6, following the release of the album. The video, directed by Elizabeth Ito, is a tribute to the film The Decline of Western Civilization (1981). It also features a cameo from Bikini Kill singer Kathleen Hanna.

A live version of "Racist, Sexist Boy" was released as a single on May 27, 2021. It contains material from the Linda Lindas' live performance at the Los Angeles Public Library. The song went on to win Best Punk Record at the 2022 Libera Awards. It was also nominated for Best Song at the 2022 Kerrang! Awards.

=== Touring ===
In April 2022, the Linda Lindas performed in Los Angeles and New York City alongside Jawbreaker. Following the release of the album, the band performed a Tiny Desk (Home) Concert at the Los Angeles Public Library, where they had previously performed their live version of "Racist, Sexist Boy". The band also appeared on The Tonight Show Starring Jimmy Fallon, performing their song "Oh!". They embarked on a tour from June to October 2022, with shows alongside Japanese Breakfast, Bacchae, and Yeah Yeah Yeahs.

== Critical reception ==
Professional ratings
Aggregate scores
Source	Rating
AnyDecentMusic?	7.8/10
Metacritic	80/100
Review scores
Source	Rating
AllMusic	3.5/5 stars
DIY	4/5 stars
Exclaim!	8/10
Kerrang!	4/5
The Line of Best Fit	7/10
Loud and Quiet	7/10
Pitchfork	8.0/10
Robert Christgau	(1-star Honorable Mention)
The Skinny	3/5 stars
Sputnikmusic	3.5/5

Growing Up received generally favorable reviews. According to the review aggregator Metacritic, Growing Up received "generally favorable reviews" based on a weighted average score of 80 out of 100 from 10 critic scores. Similarly, aggregator AnyDecentMusic? assigned the album a score of 7.8/10 based on 15 critic reviews.

Growing Up has been described as a simple, catchy, and enjoyable album. Jake Richardson at Kerrang! called it an enjoyable album that shows "there is more to come". The Skinny editor Tony Inglis called it "a light-of-foot album" that has simple concepts and fun riffs. Critic Robert Christgau gave the album a one-star honorable mention, saying that the Linda Lindas "get down to bizness [sic]" on the album. He cited "Racist, Sexist Boy", "Fine", and "Nino" as highlights. Neil Z. Yeung of AllMusic called the album a "ridiculously catchy burst of wide-eyed, youthful anthems". DIY editor Ben Tipple stated that Growing Up showed that the Linda Lindas were "more than a viral moment". He said that the album put together a political message with fun music. The Line of Best Fit writer Tom Williams called the album a demonstration of the Linda Lindas' talent, but he stated that it felt partly rushed due to the band's eagerness to capitalize on their early success.

Loud and Quiet criticized the album's production, calling the combination of the guitar and bass tracks a "mound of sludge". On the other hand, Alan Ranta at Exclaim! praised the album for its production, noting that the band benefited from having access to Carlos de la Garza, rather than having to mail demo tracks to studios. Quinn Moreland of Pitchfork stated that while "cynics" could criticize that connection as nepotism, that would "deny the Linda Lindas their agency" and be contrary to the album's theme of empowerment through collective action. Erwann S. of Sputnikmusic said that the Linda Lindas simply took an opportunity they were offered.

=== Year-end lists ===
Growing Up appeared on multiple lists in 2022. Good Morning America ranked Growing Up as number 38 on their list of the "50 best albums of 2022". Kerrang! rated it number 48 on a similar list, while No Ripcord rated it as number 34. Lisa Tozzi of Rolling Stone ranked it number 7 in "Best Music of 2022", and Samantha B of Punknews ranked it number 7 on her "Top 10 LP's of 2022". Growing Up also appeared on Loudwire's "Best Rock + Metal Debut Albums of 2022" list.

Rankings for Growing Up
Publication	Accolade	Rank
Alternative Press	The 55 best albums of 2022	*
Billboard	The 50 best albums of 2022 so far	*
Good Morning America	50 best albums of 2022	38
Kerrang!	The 50 best albums of 2022	48
Loudwire	Best Rock + Metal Debut Albums of 2022	*
NME	The 25 best debut albums of 2022	*
No Ripcord	The 50 best albums of 2022	34
Punknews	Samantha B's Picks: Top 10 LP's of 2022	7
Rolling Stone	Best Music of 2022 (Lisa Tozzi)	7
Tape Op	The Rest of the Best List 2022	*
Under the Radar	Top 100 Albums of 2022	41
(*) denotes an unranked list

== Track listing ==
Growing Up track listing
No.	Title	Writer(s)	Length
1.	"Oh!"	Lucia de la Garza; Mila de la Garza; Bela Salazar; Eloise Wong	2:35
2.	"Growing Up"	L. Garza	3:06
3.	"Talking to Myself"	M. Garza	2:22
4.	"Fine"	Wong	2:02
5.	"Nino"	Salazar	1:49
6.	"Why"	Wong	2:19
7.	"Cuántas Veces"	Salazar	3:13
8.	"Remember"	L. Garza	3:39
9.	"Magic"	L. Garza; M. Garza	2:36
10.	"Racist, Sexist Boy"	M. Garza; Wong	1:49
Total length:			25:35

Japanese release and digital bonus edition
No.	Title	Writer(s)	Length
11.	"Linda Linda"	Hiroto Kōmoto	2:34
Total length:			28:09

== Personnel ==
Credits are adapted from the liner notes of Growing Up.

=== The Linda Lindas ===
- Bela Salazar – guitars, vocals
- Eloise Wong – bass, vocals
- Lucia de la Garza – guitars, vocals
- Mila de la Garza – drums, percussion, vocals

=== Additional musicians ===
- Lil' Dude (Note: Lil' Dude is a cat; however, he is still credited in the liner notes.) – piano on "Nino"

=== Technical personnel ===
- Carlos de la Garza – producer, engineer, mixer
- Dave Cooley – mastering
- Sergio Chavez – engineer
- Matt Maroalakos – engineer
- Alec Wingfield – engineer

=== Packaging ===
- Wendy Lau – design
- Eloise Wong – cover paper art
- Zen Sekizawa – cover photo, sleeve background photos
- Albert Licano – photography
- Alice Baxley – photography
- Humberto Leon – photography (Note: Credited as "Cat eye photos")
- Batsheva – outfits
- Opening Ceremony – outfits
- Thy Mai – hair
- Valerie Vonprisk – cat eye makeup
- Littlerock Nia – additional hair, makeup
- Michael Meeks Silva – additional hair, makeup

== Charts ==
Weekly chart performance for Growing Up
Chart (2022)	Peak position
US Top Album Sales (Billboard)	19
US Vinyl Albums (Billboard)	10
Japanese Albums (Oricon)	49
Japanese Hot Albums (Billboard Japan)	92
Japanese Top Album Sales (Billboard Japan)	47
Scottish Albums (Official Charts)	54
UK Independent Albums (Official Charts)	15
UK Independent Album Breakers Chart (OCC)	4
UK Album Downloads (Official Charts)	32
UK Vinyl Albums (OCC)	37
UK Album Sales (OCC)	60
UK Physical Albums (OCC)	51
UK Record Store (OCC)	14

== Release history ==
Release history for Growing Up
Region	Date	Label	Format	Catalog
Various	April 8, 2022	Epitaph	Digital download	—
Various	May 17, 2023	Epitaph	Digital download (bonus edition)	—
United States	April 8, 2022	Epitaph	CD, LP	87875
Japan	June 3, 2022	Epitaph	CD	STCD-0004
Europe	June 3, 2022	Epitaph Europe	CD	7875-2
Europe	June 24, 2022	Epitaph Europe	LP	7875-1
