= Oh! (The Linda Lindas song) =

Single by the Linda Lindas

from the album Growing Up
- Released: July 21, 2021
- Studio: Music Friends, Los Angeles
- Genre: Punk rock
- Length: 2:35
- Label: Epitaph
- Songwriters: Bela Salazar; Eloise Wong; Lucia de la Garza; Mila de la Garza
- Producer: Carlos de la Garza

The Linda Lindas singles chronology
"Racist, Sexist Boy" (2021)	"Oh!" (2021)	"Nino" (2021)

Music video
- The Linda Lindas – "Oh!" on YouTube

"Oh!" is a song by American rock band the Linda Lindas. It is the opening track on the band's debut studio album, Growing Up (2022), released on Epitaph Records. It was written by Bela Salazar, Eloise Wong, and sisters Lucia and Mila de la Garza, and was produced by Carlos de la Garza.

On July 21, 2021, "Oh!" was released as a single with an accompanying music video. The song was featured in the trailer released for the Netflix series The Chair, which was also released that same day. "Oh!" was also featured in the film Freakier Friday (2025).

== Background ==
On May 4, 2021, the Linda Lindas played at the Los Angeles Public Library for an AAPI Heritage Month celebration, during which they played "Racist, Sexist Boy". The library soon posted a video of the performance, which became a viral social media hit. They soon signed with Epitaph Records, though they had been planning to sign for months. They released "Oh!' on Epitaph Records in July 2021.

== Composition ==
"Oh!" was written in the key of A Minor. The song has been described as a punk rock song. It has been compared to the music of the Go-Go's, Joan Jett, and the Ramones, among others.

== Music video ==
The music video for "Oh!" was directed by Ryan Baxley. It features skateboarder Ray Barbee taking pictures of the band using a Polaroid camera.

== Live performances ==
The Linda Lindas have performed "Oh!" live on The Tonight Show Starring Jimmy Fallon. At the time of the performance, Mila de la Garza was 11 years old, making her "the youngest musical performer ever on The Tonight Show."

== Personnel ==
Credits adapted from the liner notes of Growing Up.

=== The Linda Lindas ===
- Bela Salazar – guitar, lead vocals
- Eloise Wong – bass, backing vocals
- Lucia de la Garza – guitar, backing vocals
- Mila de la Garza – drums, percussion, backing vocals

=== Technical personnel ===
- Carlos de la Garza – producer, engineer, mixer
- Dave Cooley – mastering
- Sergio Chavez – engineer
- Matt Maroalakos – engineer
- Alec Wingfield – engineer
