= No Obligation =

Studio album by the Linda Lindas
- Released: October 11, 2024
- Recorded: 2024
- Studios: Henson, Hollywood, Los Angeles; Sunset Sound, Hollywood, Los Angeles; Music Friends, Los Angeles
- Length: 35:22
- Languages: English; Spanish
- Label: Epitaph
- Producer: Carlos de la Garza

The Linda Lindas chronology
| Growing Up (2022) | No Obligation (2024) | Gotta Get Out (2026) |

Singles from No Obligation
- 1. "Too Many Things" Released: April 10, 2023; 2. "Resolution/Revolution" Released: July 31, 2023; 3. "All in My Head" Released: July 16, 2024; 4. "Yo Me Estreso" Released: August 13, 2024; 5. "No Obligation" Released: September 10, 2024; 6. "Nothing Would Change" Released: October 7, 2024

No Obligation is the second studio album by American rock band the Linda Lindas, released the album on October 11, 2024, through Epitaph Records. It was produced again by Carlos de la Garza, the father of band members Lucia and Mila de la Garza. Recording sessions for No Obligation took place at Henson Recording, Sunset Sound, and Music Friends Studios in Los Angeles in 2024. Six singles were released from the album: "Too Many Things", "Resolution/Revolution", "All in My Head", "Yo Me Estreso", the title track "No Obligation", and "Nothing Would Change".

== Background ==
Following the release of their debut studio album, Growing Up (2022), "Too Many Things" was the Linda Lindas' first release of 2023. The band subsequently opened for Paramore on the North American leg of the This Is Why Tour.

== Writing and recording ==
No Obligation was written between 2022 and 2024, whenever the Linda Lindas had time outside of school or touring. Writing sessions occurred on holiday breaks and long weekends.

Recording sessions for No Obligation took place at Henson Recording, Sunset Sound, and Music Friends Studios in Los Angeles in 2024.

== Composition ==
=== Lyrics ===
The track "All in My Head" was written from the perspective of a character from the 2018 novel My Year of Rest and Relaxation by Ottessa Moshfegh. Guitarist Lucia de la Garza called it a "break from reality".

=== Music ===
In a press release, the band said they would be experimenting with post-punk, garage rock, power pop, new wave, and rock en español on the album. At the time of its announcement, the band members ranged from 13 to 19 years old, with Bela Salazar having finished high school, Mila de la Garza having finished middle school, and Lucia de la Garza and Eloise Wong in high school. "All in My Head" has been described by Lucia as more indie song, due to its use of an acoustic guitar. "Too Many Things" is a pop-punk song. Staff at Paste call the song "an anthemic slice of rock 'n' roll". "Resolution/Revolution" is classified as a punk rock and power pop song, with influences from riot grrrl style. In a review at Far Out, editor Aimee Ferrier says the song "[blends] the accessibility of pop with the raw energy and power of punk." "Resolution/Revolution" was influenced by Pantera and Judas Priest, as Bela Salazar had been listening to them.

== Release and promotion ==
=== Singles and music videos ===
No Obligation was released on October 11, 2024, by Epitaph Records. The album spawned six singles: "Too Many Things", "Resolution/Revolution", "All in My Head", "Yo Me Estreso", "No Obligation", and "Nothing Would Change". "Too Many Things" was released as a single preceding the album on April 10, 2023. Its music video for was directed by Ryan Baxley, and featured the band in a diner, acting as both waiters and customers. The second single, "Resolution/Revolution", was released on July 31, 2023. The music video for "Resolution/Revolution" was animated by Bela Salazar and edited by Eloise Wong. It was shot by the band members on their phones. "Yo Me Estreso" was released on August 13, 2024, and features "Weird Al" Yankovic playing the accordion. "No Obligation" was released as the fifth single on September 10, followed by "Nothing Would Change" on October 7.

=== Touring ===
The Linda Lindas embarked on a tour from July to September 2024, both on their own and opening for the Saviors Tour by Green Day, along with the Smashing Pumpkins, and Rancid. In October 2024, the band announced their 2025 North American Tour, with concerts during March and April.

== Critical reception ==
Professional ratings
Aggregate scores
| Source | Rating |
|---|---|
| AnyDecentMusic? | 7.7/10 |
| Metacritic | 83/100 |
Review scores
| Source | Rating |
| AllMusic | 4/5 stars |
| DIY | 4/5 stars |
| Exclaim! | 7/10 |
| Far Out | 3.5/5 stars |
| The Guardian | 4/5 stars |
| Kerrang! | 4/5 |
| NME | 4/5 stars |
| Rolling Stone | 4/5 stars |
| The Skinny | 4/5 stars |
| Under the Radar | 8/10 |

According to the review aggregator Metacritic, No Obligation received "universal acclaim" based on a weighted average score of 83 out of 100 from 10 critic scores. Similarly, aggregator AnyDecentMusic? assigned the album a score of 7.7/10 based on 13 critic reviews.

Reviewing the album for AllMusic, Neil Z. Yeung called it, "a breath of fresh air," and "a reminder that punk can be fun and pure without losing its impact or message. The Linda Lindas give us all hope that the kids will be alright."

== Track listing ==
All tracks are written by the Linda Lindas, unless otherwise noted.

No Obligation track listing
| No. | Title | Writer(s) | Length |
|---|---|---|---|
| 1. | "No Obligation" | Eloise Wong | 2:06 |
| 2. | "All in My Head" | Lucia de la Garza | 3:21 |
| 3. | "Lose Yourself" | | 3:30 |
| 4. | "Too Many Things" | | 2:35 |
| 5. | "Once Upon a Time" | L. Garza | 3:05 |
| 6. | "Yo Me Estreso" | Salazar | 3:13 |
| 7. | "Cartographers" | Wong | 3:45 |
| 8. | "Don't Think" | L. Garza | 2:56 |
| 9. | "Resolution/Revolution" | | 3:22 |
| 10. | "Nothing Would Change" | L. Garza; Mila de la Garza | 3:23 |
| 11. | "Excuse Me" | Wong | 2:13 |
| 12. | "Stop" | | 1:53 |
| Total length: | | | 35:22 |

== Personnel ==
Credits are adapted from the Bandcamp release.

=== The Linda Lindas ===
Credits are adapted from the liner notes of No Obligation.

- Bela Salazar – guitars, vocals
- Eloise Wong – bass, piano, vocals
- Lucia de la Garza – guitars, vocals
- Mila de la Garza – drums, percussion, vocals

=== Additional musicians ===
==== "Yo Me Estreso" ====
- "Weird Al" Yankovic – accordion
- India Anderson – tuba
- Kye Palmer – trumpet

=== Technical personnel ===
- Carlos de la Garza – production, engineering, mixing
- Dave Collins – mastering
- Mark Aguilar – engineer (Note: At Henson Recording Studios)
- Harriet Tam – engineer (Note: At Sunset Sound Recorders)
- Alec Wingfield – engineer
- Jordan Kulp – engineer
- Sergio Chavez – engineer
- Bobb Bruno – guitar tech
- Spencer Lere – drum tech

=== Packaging ===
- Eloise Wong – art
- Wendy Lau – design
- Zen Sekizawa – art photography
- Jessie Cowan – band portrait
- Kiki Stash – outfits
- Faye Aguilar – hair, makeup

== Charts ==
Chart performance for No Obligation
| Chart (2024) | Peak position | | |
|---|---|---|---|
| UK Album Downloads (Official Charts) | 84 | | |
| UK Rock & Metal Albums (Official Charts) | 20 | US Top Album Sales (Billboard) | 30 |

== Release history ==
Release history for No Obligation
| Region | Date | Label | Format |
|---|---|---|---|
| Various | October 11, 2024 | Epitaph | CD, digital download, LP |
