= Phil Danyew =

- Also known as: Danyew, Elephant Castle
- Born: Phillip Bruce Danyew; Orange County, California, U.S.
- Origin: San Diego, California
- Genres: Indie, rock, pop electronica
- Occupations: Producer, singer, songwriter, multi-instrumentalist
- Instruments: Vocals, keyboards, guitar, drums, bass, percussion, piano
- Years active: 2006–present
- Label: EMI/Sparrow
- Formerly of: Foster the People
- Spouse: Hannah Leder (m. 2017)
- Children: 1

Phillip Bruce Danyew is an American singer, multi-instrumentalist, songwriter, and producer. He released two extended plays in 2009, Danyew and Wake Up with EMI/Sparrow Records. He was a touring member of Foster the People.

== Early life ==
Phillip Bruce Danyew was born in Orange County, California and has a twin sister, Rachael Marie Danyew. Phillip Danyew started his songwriting career while he was in the seventh grade.

== Music career ==
Danyew started his music career in 2006, but his first extended play, The EP, was not independently released until February 17, 2009. His next two extended plays were released by Sparrow Records, Danyew on April 21, 2009, and Wake Up was released on November 17, 2009.

In 2011, Danyew started a band, Hitpoints. He joined the band Foster the People in late 2013 as a touring member. Danyew released the single "Friends for Life" via the label Old Wizard in August 2019 as a homage to The Beatles.

Danyew has produced music for HalfNoise, Katelyn Tarver, Sarah Denham and Danae.

== Discography ==
As Danyew

- The EP (February 17, 2009, Independent)
- Danyew (April 21, 2009, Sparrow)
- Wake Up (November 17, 2009, Sparrow)

As Phil Danyew

- "Friends for Life" (August 16, 2019, Old Wizard)
- "Can't Help but Fall" / "Strange Fate" / "You and Me Together" / "Life's a Cherry Pie" (with Katelyn Tarver) / "Can't Stand the Heat" (2020) for The Planters (Original Motion Picture Soundtrack)

As Elephant Castle (solo project)

- "Cool to Be Unhappy" (March 27, 2020, Old Wizard)
- "I'm a Loser" (May 8, 2020, Old Wizard)
- "Life in Outer Space" (2020)
- "My Muse" (2020)
- "Euphoria" (2020)
- "In Circles" (2021)
- "French Food" (2021)
- "Rocket to the Moon" (2021)
- "Caught in a Twilight Zone" (2021)
- "Quicksand" (2022)
- "No Me and You" (2022)

As Wave System (with Taylor Johnson)

- Inside a Dream (2021)
- Covers EP (2023)
