= The Linda Lindas =

American rock band from Los Angeles

- (L–R) Lucia de la Garza, Eloise Wong, Mila de la Garza, and Bela Salazar performing in 2022

Background information
- Origin: Los Angeles, California, United States
- Genres: Pop-punk; punk rock; riot grrrl
- Works: The Linda Lindas discography
- Years active: 2018–present
- Labels: Epitaph; Reprise
- Members: Eloise Wong; Lucia de la Garza; Mila de la Garza; Bela Salazar
- Website: www.thelindalindas.com

The Linda Lindas is an American punk rock band from Los Angeles. The group comprises Eloise Wong, sisters Lucia and Mila de la Garza, and Bela Salazar.

The band formed in 2018, and took their name from the film Linda Linda Linda, which in turn takes its name from the Blue Hearts song "Linda Linda". After being noticed by comedian Amy Poehler, they recorded the soundtrack for her film Moxie, which was released in 2021. Later that year, they released the single "Racist, Sexist Boy", which went viral. Epitaph Records signed them shortly afterwards.

In 2022, they released their debut album, Growing Up, and received mostly positive reviews.

== History ==
=== 2018–2020: Formation and EPs ===
The band was originally created to play a gig at Girlschool LA as members of Kristin Kontrol's pickup band after Kristin had seen pictures and video of Eloise singing at Save Music in Chinatown. Eloise's cousins Lucia and Mila were brought on, as well as a friend's daughter, Bela, who had been taking guitar lessons—the only one of the four who could play an instrument. Originally, it was intended to be a one-off project, but a few months later, Bela was invited to open a show for Frieda's Roses, and engaged Eloise, Lucia and Mila to be her backing band.

Bikini Kill's lead singer Kathleen Hanna had seen the band play at Girlschool, covering their song "Rebel Girl", and asked the band to open for them on April 26, 2019, at the Hollywood Palladium. Amy Poehler saw the show and had them record songs and appear in her Netflix film Moxie. In 2020, the Linda Lindas wrote a song for Netflix documentary The Claudia Kishi Club, titled "Claudia Kishi", after the Japanese-American character in Ann M. Martin's novel series The Baby-Sitters Club.

=== 2021–2022: "Racist, Sexist Boy" and Growing Up ===
In May 2021, the Los Angeles Public Library posted a video of the band playing "Racist, Sexist Boy" at a "TEENtastic Tuesdays" event. The song was about an experience Mila de la Garza, the band's drummer, had when a schoolmate made a racist comment before the COVID-19 pandemic. The video became a viral social media hit, earning praise from Rage Against the Machine's Tom Morello, Red Hot Chili Peppers's Flea, Thurston Moore, Bikini Kill's Kathleen Hanna, and Kid Cudi. Author Viet Thanh Nguyen said "'Racist, Sexist Boy' is the song we need now". On May 22, Epitaph Records announced that it had signed the Linda Lindas, in a deal which they had been working on since before the video went viral.

On June 3, 2021, the band made their late night television debut on Jimmy Kimmel Live. On July 21, 2021, the band released the single "Oh!" with an accompanying music video. The song also was featured in the trailer released for the Netflix series The Chair, which was released that same day. The song was also played for the outro of series 1 episode 5 of The Imperfects. On February 1, 2022, the band announced their release date of their debut album, Growing Up, alongside the release of the single of the same name. Growing Up was released on April 8, 2022, to generally positive reviews. The track "Racist, Sexist Boy" was nominated for Best Song at the 2022 Kerrang! Awards.

=== 2023–2025: Further events, touring and No Obligation ===
During 2023, the band performed at the Coachella Festival in April, at the 95th Scripps National Spelling Bee in May in Maryland, where they were the first to ever perform at the event, and were the opening act for selected North American concerts of Paramore's This Is Why Tour, along with Foals.

The Linda Lindas' song "Growing Up" was featured on the soundtrack for Inside Out 2. On July 13, 2024, the band opened for the Rolling Stones at SoFi Stadium, as part of their Hackney Diamonds Tour. On July 16, the band released the single "All in My Head" as the first teaser from their second album No Obligation. The band opened for Green Day, along with the Smashing Pumpkins and Rancid during the Saviors Tour. They premiered the second song off the album, "Yo Me Estreso", at the Chicago show on August 13, 2024, and was released the next day.

They appeared on children's television Yo Gabba Gabbaland, played as Little Ants and performing, "Happy to be Little".

In October 2024, the band announced their 2025 North American Tour, with concerts during March and April, alongside Be Your Own Pet and Pinkshift.

=== 2026–present: Gotta Get Out ===
On June 7, 2026, the band released "Burning Out", the first single from a forthcoming album under a new major label record deal with Reprise Records where the band actually retains the rights to their master recordings rather than signing them away to the label.

On July 10, the band announced their third album, Gotta Get Out, set to be released on August 28, along with a new single, "Closer", with Hayley Williams. The band performed at the Power to the People Festival at Merriweather Post Pavilion in Columbia on October 3. The festival was put on by Tom Morello and featured performances by himself, Bruce Springsteen, Foo Fighters and many others. It was held in response towards U.S. president Donald Trump. The band will be opening for the Warning at the Estadio GNP Seguros, in Mexico City on February 5, 2027.

== Band members ==
The band consists of bassist Eloise Wong, guitarist Lucia de la Garza, drummer Mila de la Garza and guitarist Bela Salazar, with all four performing vocals. Lucia and Mila are sisters and are the daughters of music engineer and producer Carlos de la Garza. Eloise's father is Martin Wong, co-founder of Giant Robot; Eloise is also a cousin of Lucia and Mila. The band members' stage names, birth dates, and roles are as follows:

List of band members, with name, stage name, birth date and age, and role
Name	Stage name	Birth date (age)	Role
Bela Salazar	Linda Linda No. 1	September 16, 2004 (age 22)	Guitarist, vocalist
Eloise Wong	Linda Linda No. 2	February 11, 2008 (age 18)	Bassist, vocalist
Lucia de la Garza	Linda Linda No. 3	January 14, 2007 (age 19)	Guitarist, vocalist
Mila de la Garza	Linda Linda No. 4	August 15, 2010 (age 16)	Drummer, vocalist

== Discography ==
=== Studio albums ===
- Growing Up (2022)
- No Obligation (2024)
- Gotta Get Out (2026)

== Tours ==
- 2025 North American Tour (2025)
- Gotta Get Out Tour (2026)

== Filmography ==
=== Film performances ===
- Moxie (2021), band at party – cameo

=== Television performances ===
- Jimmy Kimmel Live! (2021, 2025), performer
- The Tonight Show Starring Jimmy Fallon (2022), musical guest – episode no. 1644
- Yo Gabba Gabbaland (2024), episode 3 Little, as the Little Shrimp band

== Awards and nominations ==
Awards and nominations received by the Linda Lindas
Award	Year (Note: Indicates the year of ceremony. Each year is linked to the article about the awards held that year, wherever possible.)	Nominee/work	Category	Result	Ref.
Libera Awards	2022	"Racist, Sexist Boy"	Best Punk Record	Won	
Kerrang! Awards	2022	"Racist, Sexist Boy"	Best Song	Nominated	
Guild of Music Supervisors Awards	2024	"Little Bit O' Soul"	Best Song Written and/or Recording Created for a Film	Nominated	

== See also ==
- List of songs recorded by the Linda Lindas
