= Carlos de la Garza (music producer) =

American music producer

- Origin: Cerritos, California, U.S.
- Genres: Indie rock; ska-punk; alternative rock; pop punk; electronic rock
- Occupations: Record producer; songwriter
- Instrument: Drums
- Years active: 2006–present

Carlos de la Garza is a two-time Grammy award-winning American mixer, record producer, engineer, musician, and songwriter based in Los Angeles.

== Early life ==
De la Garza was born and raised in Cerritos, California. He started playing drums in high school and played in various local bands. While still in high school, he simultaneously joined Long Beach ska-punk band Suburban Rhythm and punk band F.Y.P, and later became a member of Reel Big Fish.

== Music production and engineering ==
De la Garza has worked with artists and bands such as Death Cab For Cutie, Hayley Williams, Cold War Kids, All American Rejects, The Wonder Years, Neon Trees, The Linda Lindas, Paramore, M83, Young the Giant, Jimmy Eat World, Teenage Wrist, Tegan and Sara, Wolf Alice, Cherry Glazerr, Best Coast, Hunny, Wild Belle, Charly Bliss, Bad Religion, Ray Barbee, Fitz and the Tantrums, White Reaper, Spiritual Cramp, The Regrettes, Destroy Boys, Fidlar, Third Eye Blind, Bleached, Wilt, and Ziggy Marley, whose self-titled album mixed and engineered by de la Garza won a Grammy Award in 2016. Paramore's Self-titled album, which de la Garza engineered and performed on, also won a Grammy award for "Best Rock Song" in 2015. In 2018 Wolf Alice was awarded the Mercury Prize for their album "Visions of A Life", which de la Garza also engineered. In 2024, This Is Why won the Grammy Awards for Best Rock Album and Best Rock Performance for the title track.

In addition to his production and engineering work, de la Garza plays drums and percussion, guitar, bass, and keyboards. De la Garza was also a member of punk band F.Y.P. from 1991 to 1993 and popular ska punk band Reel Big Fish, in which he played drums from 1999 to 2003.

De la Garza's two daughters, Lucia and Mila, are members of the punk rock band The Linda Lindas.

== Discography ==
Year	Artist	Title	Label	Role
2026	Wilt	when no one's watching	AWAL	Producer
2026	The Linda Lindas	GOTTA GET OUT	Reprise Records	Producer, engineer, mixer
2026	Jjerome87	"Brush Me Like A Horse", "Track And Field"	Mushroom Music/Virgin Music Group	Producer, mixer
2026	Death Cab For Cutie	I Built You A Tower LP	Anti-	Mixer
2025	Spiritual Cramp	"Rude LP"	Blue Grape Music	Mixer
2025	Dogpark	"Hollywood"	Severance Records	Producer
2024	Destroy Boys	"Boyfeel"	Hopeless	Producer, co-writer
2024	The Linda Lindas	"Found a Job"	A24	Producer
2024	Cold War Kids	"Scandalized"		Producer, co-writer
2024	Spiritual Cramp & White Reaper	"Whatever You Say Man"	Blue Grape	Mixer
2024	Destroy Boys	"Plucked"	Hopeless	Co-writer, Producer
2024	Paramore	"Burning Down the House"	A24	Producer
2024	The Linda Lindas	No Obligation	Epitaph	Producer, engineer, mixer
2023	Paramore & The Linda Lindas	"The News (Re: The Linda Lindas)"	Atlantic	Producer
2023	Cold War Kids	"Run Away With Me"		Producer
2023	Destroy Boys	"Beg For the Torture"	Hopeless	Co-writer, producer
2023	Paramore	This Is Why	Atlantic	Producer
2023	M83	"Oceans Niagara"		Engineer
2023	Spiritual Cramp	Spiritual Cramp	Blue Grape	Producer, mixer
2022	Friday Pilots Club	"Bury Me"		Co-write, co-producer
2022	The Linda Lindas	Growing Up	Epitaph	Producer, engineer, mixer
2022	HUNNY	Homesick EP	Epitaph	Producer
2021	Hayley Williams	Flowers for Vases / Descansos	Atlantic	Mixer
2021	Natalie Bergman feat. Beck	"You've Got A Woman"	Third Man	Mixer
2021	Man On Man	Self-titled LP	Polyvinyl	Mixer
2021	Third Eye Blind	Our Bande Apart	MegaCollider	Mixer
2021	The Linda Lindas	"Oh!"	Epitaph	Producer, engineer, mixer
2021	Justin Courtney-Pierre	An Anthropologist on Mars	Epitaph	Mixer
2020	Becca Mancari	The Greatest Part	Captured Tracks	Mixer
2020	Best Coast	Always Tomorrow	Concord Records	Producer, mixer, co-writer
2020	Elephant Castle	Cool To Be Unhappy EP	Old Wizard	Engineer, Mixer
2020	Hayley Williams	Petals for Armor	Atlantic Records	Engineer, Mixer
2020	Bad Religion	'"Faith Alone", "Emancipation of the Mind", "What Are We Standing For", "Lose Your Head (demo version)"'	Epitaph	Producer, engineer, Mixer
2019	All American Rejects	"Send Her to Heaven"	Epitaph	Mixer
2019	Bad Religion	Age of Unreason	Epitaph	Producer, mixer, co-writer
2019	Charly Bliss	Young Enough	Barsuk	Mixer
2019	Cherry Glazerr	Stuffed and Ready	Secretly Canadian	Producer, mixer, co-writer
2019	HalfNoise	Natural Disguise	Congrats	Mixer
2019	HUNNY	Yes. Yes. Yes. Yes. Yes.	Epitaph	Producer, Composer & Mixer
2019	Wild Belle	Everybody One of a Kind	Love Tone	Mixer, additional production
2019	Fitz and the Tantrums	All the Feels	Elektra	Engineer
2018	Culture Abuse	Bay Dream	Epitaph	Producer, mixer, various instruments
2018	Parade of Lights	Human Condition Pt. 1 & 2	UMG	Producer, Writer & Engineer
2018	Plague Vendor	"Locomotive", "I Only Speak In Friction"	Epitaph	Mixer
2018	Teenage Wrist	Chrome Neon Jesus	Epitaph	Producer, co-writer, engineer, mixer
2018	The Wonder Years	Sister Cities	Hopeless	Mixer
2018	Wavves and Culture Abuse	"Big Cloud", "Up and Down"	Epitaph	Mixer
2018	Ziggy Marley	Rebellion Rises	Tuff Gong Worldwide	Engineer
2017	Cherry Glazerr	Apocalipstick	Burger, Secretly Canadian	Producer, mixer
2017	Paramore	After Laughter	Fueled by Ramen	Mixer, engineer
2017	Alvarez Kings	Somewhere Between	Sire, Warner Bros.	Producer, mixer
2017	Wolf Alice	Visions of a Life	Dirty Hit	Engineer, additional percussion (tracks 7, 12)
2016	Wild Belle	Dreamland	Columbia	Bass, engineer, guitar
2016	Jimmy Eat World	Integrity Blues	RCA	Engineer
2016	M83	Junk	Naive, Mute	Engineer
2016	Lyle Workman	Love (Original Netflix Series Soundtrack)	Independent	Mixer
2016	School of Seven Bells	SVIIB	Vagrant	Engineer
2016	The Naked and Famous	Simple Forms	Somewhat Damaged	Engineer
2016	Bleached	Welcome the Worms	Dead Oceans	Producer, mixer, engineer
2016	Ziggy Marley	Ziggy Marley	Tuff Gong Worldwide	Mixer, engineer
2015	Night riots	Howl	Sumerian	Producer, mixer, engineer
2015	YACHT	I Thought the Future Would Be Cooler	Downtown	Engineer
2015	WATERS	What's Real	Vagrant	Producer, mixer, engineer, various instruments
2014	Young the Giant	Mind over Matter	Fueled by Ramen	Engineer, percussion
2014	Jaymes Young	Habits of my Heart EP	Atlantic	Producer
2014	The Colourist	The Colourist	Republic, Universal	Producer, composer ("Tonight (Young Hearts)")
2014	M83	Divergent: Original Motion Picture Soundtrack	Interscope	Engineer
2014	The Downtown Fiction	Losers & Kings	Photo Finish	Producer, engineer
2013	Hellogoodbye	Everything is Debatable	Fearless	Additional production, drums
2013	Tegan and Sara	Heartthrob	Vapor, Warner Bros.	Engineer
2013	Paramore	Paramore	Fueled by Ramen	Engineer, mixing engineer, vocal producer, percussion
2012	Neon Trees	Picture Show	Mercury	Engineer, percussion
2010	Valencia	Dancing With a Ghost	I Surrender	Producer, engineer
2010	Neon Trees	Habits	Mercury	Engineer, mixer
2002	Reel Big Fish	Cheer Up!	Mojo, Jive	Drums, Percussion

=== Awards ===
Year	Nominee / work	Award	Result
2024	"This Is Why (album)" (as Producer)	Grammy Award: Best Rock Album	Won
2024	"This Is Why" (as Producer)	Grammy Award: Best Alternative Music Performance	Won
2019	"Rebellion Rises" (as Engineer)	Grammy Award: Best Reggae Album	Nominated
2018	"Visions of a Life" (as Engineer)	Mercury Prize	Won
2017	"Ziggy Marley" (as Mixer & Engineer)	Grammy Award: Best Reggae Album	Won
2015	"Ain't It Fun" (as Engineer, mixing engineer, vocal producer, percussion)	Grammy Award: Rock Song Of The Year	Won
