= The Final Riot! =

Live album by Paramore
- Released: November 24, 2008
- Recorded: August 12, 2008
- Venue: Congress Theater (Chicago, IL)
- Genre: Alternative rock; pop punk; emo pop; emo
- Length: 66:36
- Label: Fueled by Ramen

Paramore chronology
Riot! (2007)	The Final Riot! (2008)	Brand New Eyes (2009)

Professional ratings
Review scores
Source	Rating
AbsolutePunk.net	85% link
AllMusic	3.5/5 stars

The Final Riot! is the second official live album by the American rock band Paramore and was released on November 25, 2008, with a bonus DVD containing the full live concert plus behind-the-scenes footage.

The DVD was filmed on August 12, 2008, at the Congress Theater in Chicago on The Final Riot! Summer Tour. It contains a documentary entitled "40 Days of Riot!", showing the band on tour. It is available in a standard and limited deluxe edition, which includes a 36-color-page booklet of the tour, along with another documentary, 40 MORE Days of Riot!.

== Track listing ==
All tracks are written by Hayley Williams and Josh Farro, except where noted.

The Final Riot! track listing
No.	Title	Writer(s)	Length
1.	"Born for This"		5:46
2.	"That's What You Get"	Williams; J. Farro; Taylor York	3:34
3.	"Here We Go Again"		4:10
4.	"Fences"	Williams; J. Farro; David Bendeth	3:31
5.	"crushcrushcrush"		3:15
6.	"Let the Flames Begin"		5:38
7.	"When It Rains"	Williams; J. Farro; Zac Farro	4:04
8.	"My Heart"		5:31
9.	"Decoy" (studio version on "Hallelujah" single and Riot! Hot Topic bonus track edition)		3:14
10.	"Pressure"		3:02
11.	"For a Pessimist, I'm Pretty Optimistic"		4:27
12.	"We Are Broken"	Williams; J. Farro; Bendeth	5:25
13.	"Emergency"		5:23
14.	"Hallelujah" (contains excerpt from Leonard Cohen's "Hallelujah")		4:57
15.	"Misery Business"		4:40

== Personnel ==
- Hayley Williams – lead vocals, keyboards
- Josh Farro – lead guitar, backing vocals, bass guitar on "We Are Broken"
- Jeremy Davis – bass guitar, drums on "We Are Broken"
- Zac Farro – drums, percussion
- Taylor York – rhythm guitar, glockenspiel on "We Are Broken"

== Charts ==
Chart performance for The Final Riot!
Chart (2008–2009)	Peak position
Australian Albums (ARIA)	38
Finnish Albums (Suomen virallinen lista)	31
Mexican Albums (AMPROFON)	47
UK Albums (OCC)	153
UK Rock & Metal Albums (OCC)	18
US Billboard 200	88
US Top Alternative Albums (Billboard)	15
US Top Rock Albums (Billboard)	22

== Certifications ==
Certifications for The Final Riot!
Region	Certification	Certified units/sales
Canada (Music Canada)	Platinum	10,000^{^}
United Kingdom (BPI)	Gold	25,000^{*}
United States (RIAA)	Gold	50,000^{^}
^{*} Sales figures based on certification alone.^{^} Shipments figures based on certification alone.

== Release history ==
Release history and formats for The Final Riot!
Country	Date
United Kingdom	November 24, 2008
United States	November 25, 2008
Australia	November 29, 2008
Brazil	December 6, 2008
Colombia	December 8, 2008
