= Crushcrushcrush =

2007 single by Paramore

Single by Paramore

from the album Riot!
- B-side: "Misery Business"; "For a Pessimist, I'm Pretty Optimistic"
- Released: November 26, 2007
- Recorded: February 2007
- Genre: Alternative rock; power pop
- Length: 3:09
- Label: Fueled by Ramen; Atlantic
- Songwriters: Hayley Williams; Josh Farro
- Producers: David Bendeth; John Janick

Paramore singles chronology
| "Hallelujah" (2007) | "Crushcrushcrush" (2007) | "That's What You Get" (2008) |

Music video
- "crushcrushcrush" on YouTube

"Crushcrushcrush" is a song by the American rock band Paramore, released in late 2007 as the third single from the group's second studio album Riot!. It was made available in the United Kingdom for download from November 5 and purchase on November 26, 2007. The single is also playable on various music video games such as Rock Band, Rock Band Unplugged, Guitar Hero On Tour: Decades, and Ultimate Band. The single won a Teen Choice Award for "Choice Rock Track". It was also used briefly in NCIS, in the episode "Stakeout". On March 24, 2016, the song was certified Platinum in the United States for selling over 1,000,000 copies.

== Composition ==
"Crushcrushcrush" has been described as alternative rock and power pop.

== Reception ==
Alex Fletcher at Digital Spy described the song as having "Juicy riffs, a humongous chorus, a cheesy breakdown." Fletcher also commented on the song being more Kelly Clarkson and Avril Lavigne than Metallica. It is observed as a very catchy song at BBC News Online, whom stated "The further into it you get, the better it becomes with some brilliant and energetic guitars joining in." Ed Masley at The Arizona Republic ranked it as the 12th best Paramore song, stating "As for the crushes in the title, they're whispered in a voice that may be best described as sinister. And the guitar licks seal the deal." Jerry Holkins, however, remarked, "The lyrics are beyond incoherent, a dreadlock of oily nonsense that is either the result of schizophrenia, multiple authorship, or collated from multiple failed songs and compressed into some tar lozenge of epic failure."

In 2014, thought catalog included "crushcrushcrush" in their list of 49 Phenomenally Angsty Pop-Punk Songs From The 2000s You Forgot Existed. In 2017, NME ranked the song number five on their list of the 10 greatest Paramore songs, and in 2021, Kerrang! ranked the song number one on their list of the 20 greatest Paramore songs.

== Music video ==
The official music video, directed by Shane Drake, premiered on TRL on October 16, 2007. It shows the band performing in a barren desert environment, and three people spying on them through binoculars from a distance behind various old trinkets that have formed a faux house without walls or a roof. Intercut between Paramore's performance of the song are clips of the band walking through the voyeurs' "house" and later on, short clips show that Paramore and the bandits watching them are the same (Hayley Williams in the bathtub, John Janick and Jeremy Davis playing and slamming their guitars and Zac Farro pushing his stands over and throwing drums).

Davis stated in an interview with Kerrang! that the group was not able to fully finish the video and some shots were just repeated because of a large sandstorm which set in a few hours into recording the video. The video was also nominated for a Best Rock Video at the 2008 MTV Video Music Awards, but lost to Linkin Park's "Shadow of the Day".

== Single release ==
The single is available in 3 formats. In addition to "Crushcrushcrush", certain vinyl releases feature live versions of "Misery Business" and "For a Pessimist, I'm Pretty Optimistic" from Paramore's album, Riot!

== Track listings ==
CD
| No. | Title | Length |
|---|---|---|
| 1. | "crushcrushcrush" (album version) | 3:09 |

7-inch 1
| No. | Title | Length |
|---|---|---|
| 1. | "crushcrushcrush" | 3:09 |
| 2. | "Misery Business" (live) |

7-inch 2
| No. | Title | Length |
|---|---|---|
| 1. | "crushcrushcrush" | 3:09 |
| 2. | "For a Pessimist, I'm Pretty Optimistic" (live) |

== Charts ==
=== Weekly charts ===
Weekly chart performance for "Crushcrushcrush"
| Chart (2007–2008) | Peak position |
|---|---|
| Canada Rock (Billboard) | 43 |
| Finland (Suomen virallinen lista) | 4 |
| New Zealand (Recorded Music NZ) | 32 |
| Scotland Singles (Official Charts) | 23 |
| UK Singles (Official Charts) | 61 |
| US Billboard Hot 100 | 54 |
| US Alternative Airplay (Billboard) | 4 |
| US Pop 100 (Billboard) | 43 |

=== Year-end charts ===
Year-end chart performance for "Crushcrushcrush"
| Chart (2008) | Position |
|---|---|
| US Alternative Songs (Billboard) | 23 |

== Certifications ==
Certifications for "Crushcrushcrush"
| Region | Certification | Certified units/sales |
|---|---|---|
| New Zealand (RMNZ) | Platinum | 30,000^{‡} |
| United Kingdom (BPI) | Gold | 400,000^{‡} |
| United States (RIAA) | Platinum | 1,000,000^{‡} |
^{‡} Sales+streaming figures based on certification alone.
