= That's What You Get =

Single by Paramore

from the album Riot!
- Released: March 25, 2008
- Recorded: 2006
- Genre: Pop rock; pop-punk; power pop
- Length: 3:40
- Label: Fueled by Ramen
- Songwriters: Hayley Williams; Josh Farro; Taylor York
- Producer: David Bendeth

Paramore singles chronology
"Crushcrushcrush" (2007)	"That's What You Get" (2008)	"Decode" (2008)

Music video
- "That's What You Get" on YouTube

"That's What You Get" is a song by American rock band Paramore from their second studio album, Riot! (2007). It is the second Australian single, third American single and the fourth UK single. The song was released to modern rock radio on March 25 and to contemporary hit radio on April 22 in the US. It is notable for being the only song on the album co-written by touring guitarist Taylor York, who would become an official member of the band following its release.

"That's What You Get" was released digitally as an extended play in April 2008 and physically as a CD single in May 2008. The song is featured as a playable track in the video game Rock Band 2.

The song was certified Platinum in the United States on March 24, 2016, selling over 1,000,000 copies. "That's What You Get" enjoyed crossover success on the radio, peaking higher on the pop-based Mainstream Top 40 chart than Alternative Songs.

== Composition ==
Stylistically, "That's What You Get" has been labeled as pop rock, pop-punk, and power pop, as well as having influences from funk and disco music. Josh Farro told Ultimate Guitar that; " I wrote (the song) sort of sitting in my bedroom and I was like ‘Oh, it’s pretty cool’... and (he and Hayley) wrote it in Orlando, Florida... She’s like, ‘I think I have something to this.’ It’s a pretty self-explanatory song; "that’s what you get when you let your heart win"; you don’t really think with your head. You’re more thinking based on a feeling. Jonathan Bradley from Stylus Magazine described the song as containing a "relentless assault of sugar-sweet riffs and soaring choruses".

== Critical reception ==
Fraser McAlpine at BBC Online gave the song a rating of 4 out of 5 stars, and stated "Paramore's sense of dynamics has always been strong, and the introduction to this song is a great example of that." McAlpine also praises the funk and disco influences during the verses, as well as the drumming style of the song. The song has been also labeled as one of the greatest emo songs of all time.

== Music video ==
The music video, directed by Marcos Siega, was shot in Nashville, Tennessee, on March 2 and March 3, 2008. MTV2 released the official music video on March 24, 2008. The music video shows the band playing in a living room with clips of a relationship of two lovers (Aaron Holmes [of Death in the Park] and Jenna Galing, both from Gloucester, Virginia*) and a small gathering of the band's family and friends. The couple's relationship is shown to be on the rocks as the girl calls the boy to meet up but then pushes him away. They go throughout their day before the party spending time with the band members and trying to be together. Cut scenes of Hayley Williams singing the song outside in front of the camera with her back to the friends and family are shown. At the party, the boyfriend is approached by another girl who flirts with him and holds his hand. The girlfriend becomes distraught but reunites in an embrace with her boyfriend as the party-goers all sit around a fire pit. The video ends in a fast-motion sequence with the lovers kissing and taking a picture of themselves on a cellphone, and all the people at the party are rushing out the living room, knocking over a couch, and leaving a record spinning.

=== Background ===
The music video was shot just over a week after Paramore cancelled their European tour to work on "personal issues", amidst media speculation of the band breaking up. Hayley Williams explained that, given the fragile state of the band, they all thought it best if they kept the shoot low-key, surrounding themselves with their friends and family, keeping it simple.

Williams added "We had tons of friends there, and it really just felt like a hangout session. And Marcos was so cool about it. He said, 'Bring your friends.' We shot it in some of our friends' houses, and it just felt so real ... and I think it's the first time in a video you're gonna get to see who we really are."

== Track listing ==
Digital EP

1. "That's What You Get" – 3:40
2. "Misery Business" (Live in Astoria) – 3:46
3. "For a Pessimist, I'm Pretty Optimistic" – 3:59

== Personnel ==
Personnel adapted from Riot! liner notes

Paramore

- Hayley Williams – lead vocals
- Josh Farro – guitar, background vocals
- Jeremy Davis – background vocals
- Zac Farro – drums, background vocals

Additional Musicians

- Brian Weaver – bass
- Steve "Untitled" Smith – backing vocals

Technical Personnel

- John Bender – digital editing, engineer, vocal producer
- David Bendeth – producer, mixer
- Dan Korneff – digital editing, engineer
- Tim Flanzbaum – assistant engineer, digital editing
- Kato Khandwala – audio engineer
- Ted Jensen – mastering at Sterling Sound Studios
- Isaiah Abolin – assistant mixing engineer

== Charts ==
Chart performance for "That's What You Get"
Chart (2008)	Peak position
Canada Hot 100 (Billboard)	92
Canada CHR/Top 40 (Billboard)	42
New Zealand (Recorded Music NZ)	35
Scottish Singles Sales (Official Charts)	30
UK Singles (Official Charts)	55
US Billboard Hot 100	66
US Alternative Airplay (Billboard)	36
US Pop Airplay (Billboard)	18
US Pop 100 (Billboard)	25

== Certifications ==
Certifications and sales for "That's What You Get"
Region	Certification	Certified units/sales
New Zealand (RMNZ)	Platinum	30,000^{‡}
United Kingdom (BPI)	Gold	400,000^{‡}
United States (RIAA)	Platinum	1,000,000^{‡}
^{‡} Sales+streaming figures based on certification alone.

== Release history ==
Release dates and formats for "That's What You Get"
Country	Date	Format	Label	Ref.
United States	March 25, 2008	Modern rock radio	Fueled by Ramen; Lava	
Worldwide (Note: The extended play released on April 18, 2008 was issued to all countries other than the United States.)	April 18, 2008	Extended play	Atlantic	
United States	April 22, 2008	Contemporary hit radio	Fueled by Ramen; RRP	
United States	May 13, 2008	CD single	Atlantic	
