= Hallelujah (Paramore song) =

Single by Paramore

from the album Riot!
- B-side: "When it Rains"; "Decoy"
- Released: September 10, 2007
- Genre: Pop-punk
- Length: 3:23
- Label: Fueled by Ramen
- Songwriters: Hayley Williams; Josh Farro
- Producer: David Bendeth

Paramore singles chronology
"Misery Business" (2007)	"Hallelujah" (2007)	"Crushcrushcrush" (2007)

Music video
- "Hallelujah" on YouTube

"Hallelujah" is a song by American rock band Paramore, released as the second single from their second studio album Riot!. The single peaked at No. 139 on the UK Singles Chart. The song is not to be confused with the Leonard Cohen song of the same name, although on the Final Riot! summer 2008 tour, lead singer Hayley Williams performed an extract, accompanied by lead guitarist, Josh Farro.

== Composition ==
"Hallelujah" has been described as a pop-punk track.

== Music video ==
The video, directed by Big TV!, was officially released on July 30, 2007. The video appears as a photo montage of backstage and live performance photos, with the lyrics of the song written in the spaces between the photos. The video will zoom in and out on some of the photos. When the photo fills the entire screen, the photo will be revealed to actually be a short video clip, and the video clip will play. The video was shot at Rocketown in Nashville, USA when the band were playing their Riot! tour, even though the music is playing over the concert performance.

== Cover versions and usage in media ==
The Rusty Pipes covered an a cappella version of the song (including Leonard Cohen's song of the same name) at their 13th Annual Pipe-A-Thon on December 12, 2009, and posted it on their YouTube channel on January 24, 2010.

The Vitamin String Quartet covered this song along with other Paramore songs, which were released as a downloadable album.

The song was featured in an episode of the British television soap opera Hollyoaks in October 2008 ("Misery Business" was also used in another episode in March 2008 and then later "Born for This" in September 2008). The song was also featured twice (once as a string quartet version) on the fourth season of So You Think You Can Dance.

== Single release ==
A CD single and two 7"s were released in the UK on 10 September.

CD single – AT0284CD
No.	Title	Length
1.	"Hallelujah"	3:19
2.	"When It Rains (Demo Version)"	3:23

Vinyl 1 – AT0284
No.	Title	Length
1.	"Hallelujah"	3:19
2.	"Decoy"	3:17

Vinyl 2 (picture disc) – AT0284X
No.	Title	Length
1.	"Hallelujah"	3:19

== Personnel ==
Personnel adapted from Riot! liner notes

Paramore

- Hayley Williams – lead vocals
- Josh Farro – guitar, background vocals
- Zac Farro – drums

Additional Personnel

- Brian Weaver – bass
- Boots – additional drums and keys programming
- John Bender – digital editing, engineer, vocal producer, backing vocals
- David Bendeth – producer, mixer, percussion, loops, synthesizer
- Dan Korneff – digital editing, engineer
- Tim Flanzbaum – assistant engineer, digital editing
- Kato Khandwala – audio engineer
- Ted Jensen – mastering at Sterling Sound Studios
- Isaiah Abolin – assistant mixing engineer

== Charts ==
Chart performance for "Hallelujah"
Chart (2007)	Peak position
UK Singles (OCC)	139

== Release history ==
Release dates and formats for "Hallelujah"
Country	Date	Format
Worldwide	September 10, 2007	Digital download
Ireland	September 10, 2007	CD
United Kingdom	September 10, 2007	Vinyl; CD
