= HalfNoise =

Musical project of Zac Farro

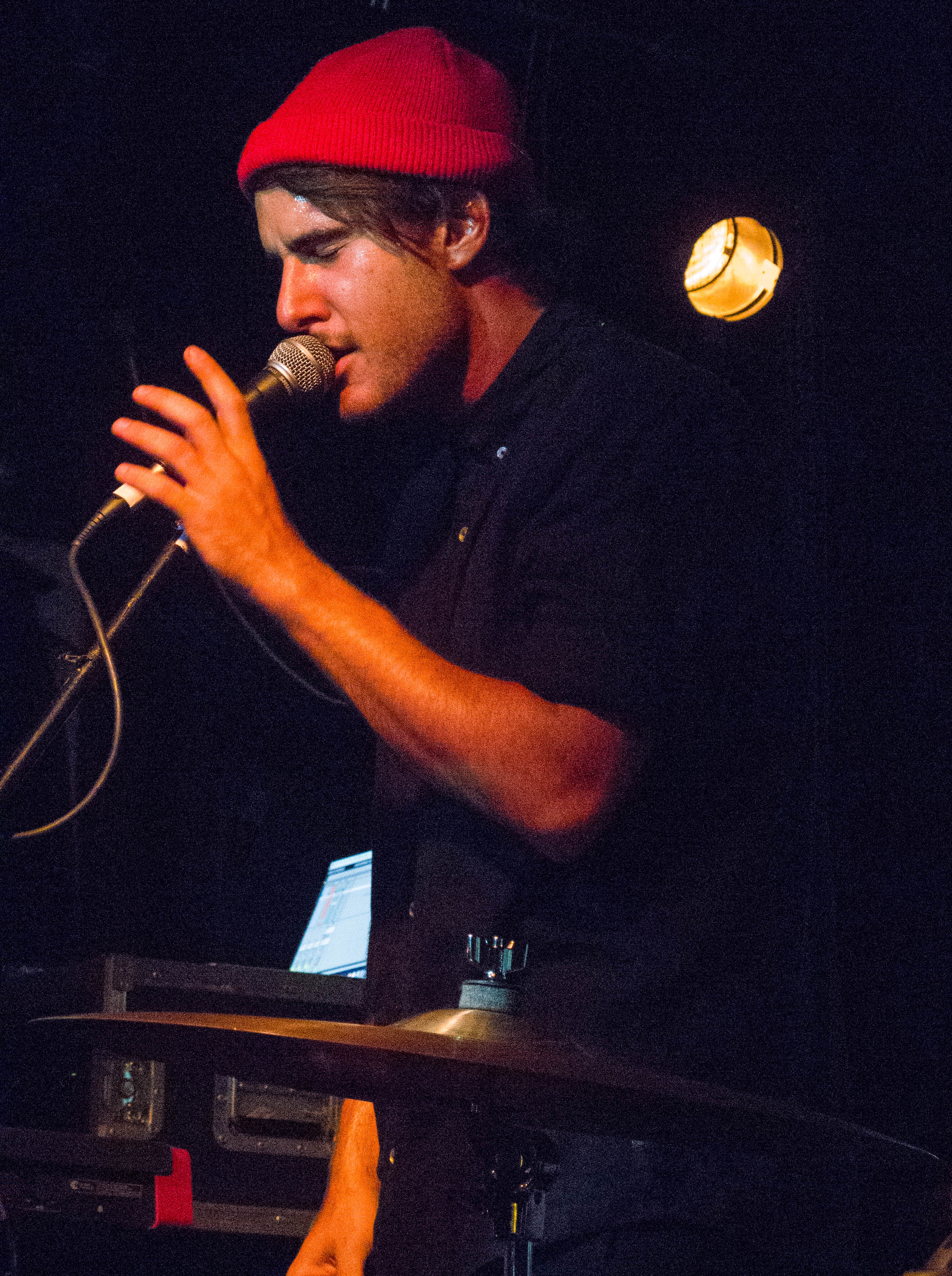
- HalfNoise at The King's Arms in April 2015

Background information
- Also known as: Tunnel
- Origin: Franklin, Tennessee, U.S.
- Genres: Alternative rock; indie pop; synth-pop; ambient
- Years active: 2010–present
- Labels: Congrats Records; LAB Records; Xtra Mile Recordings
- Members: Zac Farro
- Past members: Jason Clark

HalfNoise (often stylized as HALFNOISE) is the musical project of Zac Farro, drummer of the American rock band Paramore. Based in Nashville, Tennessee, Farro formed the project alongside Jason Clark following Farro's departure from Paramore in 2010. The project now consists of Farro alone. He released the debut self-titled EP of the project, HalfNoise, in 2012. Since then, he released five studio albums, Volcano Crowe (2014), Sudden Feeling (2016), Natural Disguise (2019), Motif (2021), and City Talk (2023); and two EPs The Velvet Face (2017) and Flowerss (2018).

== History ==
=== Early career (2010–2011) ===
HalfNoise was created two days after Zac Farro's departure from Paramore, under the original name "Tunnel". Zac took part in this new project, along with Jason Clark, releasing a song called "Hide Your Eyes".

Farro and Clark had earlier been together in a band with Taylor York and Farro's brother Josh Farro prior to Paramore. The duo then renamed themselves "HalfNoise" due to other bands being named "Tunnel". In March 2011, it was announced that Farro would be joining his brother's band Novel American, but would still continue take part in HalfNoise.

=== HalfNoise EP (2012) ===
After Farro left Paramore, he started working on HalfNoise's debut EP self-titled HalfNoise. The production was finished on 2011, Farro stated that he recorded almost all the instruments with his friend Daniel James, "I played all the drums, I did all the sampling. Me and a producer called Daniel James did the guitars together, but it was mainly just me performing." On June 14, 2012, HalfNoise released their first official single "Free the House" along with a music video. The song served as the lead single of the EP, which was released on October 1, 2012, in the UK through Xtra Mile Recordings and on October 2 through their official website. The EP composed of previous demos from 2010 and new material. Later in 2012, the EP was made available for free digital download through NoiseTrade.

=== Volcano Crowe (2013–2014) ===
Farro posted via Instagram in August 2013 that he spent 7 months writing and recording a new full-length album with his friends and producer Daniel James. He also stated that the album is titled Volcano Crowe because he recorded the album at the bottom of a volcano and his friend Rowan Crowe was the reason he visited New Zealand in the first place. The album production was finished on September 29, 2013. On May 26, 2014, Farro premiered the album's first single, "Mountain", and on September 16 released he released the second single "Hurricane Love" with a music video of a live performance of the song at New Zealand. The album was released on September 30, 2014, via Bandcamp.

=== Sudden Feeling (2016) ===
In June 2016, Farro released "Know the Feeling" as the lead single for his then untitled album. With the release of the title track, the album was revealed to be called Sudden Feeling. The full album was premiered on Billboard on September 6, and the album was released September 9, 2016. In December 2016, Farro released the music video for the title track via YouTube.

=== The Velvet Face EP (2017) ===
On March 24, 2017, HalfNoise's second EP, The Velvet Face, was released. Farro said that the EP doesn't only "demonstrate the light heartedness of HalfNoise, but I think it also encompasses my own vulnerabilities musically and artistically. I feel like this EP encompasses the feeling you get from a full LP, but filtered through only 5 songs. This is definitely the most important piece of music, to me personally, that I've ever written or worked on to-date with HalfNoise. Not only was it special for me as an artist and writer but from my friends who played, collaborated, and shared with me in making something so special." The EP includes a collaboration with Paramore vocalist Hayley Williams in the song "As U Wave", band in which Farro returned the same month of the release of the EP, but still continue with Halfnoise. The songs "Scooby's In The Back" and "French Class" began to be interpreted by Paramore on their "After Laughter" tours.

The EP has three music videos: On March 7, 2017, Farro uploaded a music video for "French Class" on YouTube, on June 15, Farro uploaded a music video for "Someday" and on October 11, he uploaded a music video for "Scooby's In The Back".

=== Flowerss EP (2018) ===
On February 23, 2018, Farro announced that he would release his new EP "Flowerss" on May 4 and released his new single of the same name that same day. Farro released the second single, "All That Love Is", on April 5.

A third single, "She Said", was released on April 13.

=== Natural Disguise (2019) ===
On October 4, 2019, HalfNoise released their 3rd studio album, Natural Disguise. Singles from the album were Who Could You Be, Boogie Juice, and Natural Disguise. Boogie Juice was played by Paramore during their tour in 2022.

=== City Talk (2023) ===
On November 17, 2023, HalfNoise released their 4th studio album, City Talk. Farro cited J-Pop, and the city of Los Angeles as an inspiration for the album. The lead single for the album, Baby, was written and recorded in little more than a day.

== Influences ==
Farro has stated that some of his favorite musical acts are Jimmy Eat World, Radiohead, Death Cab for Cutie, Mew, Paper Route, Sigur Ros, Thrice, Sunny Day Real Estate and múm.

== Members ==
Current members

- Zac Farro – lead vocals, drums, percussion, keyboards, bass, guitar, programming (2010–present)

Current touring musicians

- Logan MacKenzie – lead guitar (2014–present)
- Joseph Mullen – drums, percussion (2016–present)
- Gavin McDonald – percussion, backing vocals, additional drums (2019–present), drums (2016)
- Daniel Kadawatha – rhythm guitar, keyboards, synthesizers, backing vocals (2016–present)
- Joey Howard – bass guitar, backing vocals (2017–present)

Former members

- Jason Clark – guitar (2010–2012)

== Discography ==
=== Studio albums ===
- Volcano Crowe (2014)
- Sudden Feeling (2016)
- Natural Disguise (2019)
- Motif (2021)
- City Talk (2023)

=== EPs ===
- HalfNoise (2012)
- The Velvet Face (2017)
- Flowerss (2018)

=== Singles ===
Title	Year	Album
"Free the House"	2012	HalfNoise
"Mountain"	2014	Volcano Crowe
"Hurricane Love"	2014	Volcano Crowe
"Inside"	2015	Non-album singles
"Know the Feeling"	2016	Sudden Feeling
"In the Summer"	2016	Sudden Feeling
"Sudden Feeling"	2016	Sudden Feeling
"French Class"	2017	The Velvet Face
"Scooby's in the Back"	2017	The Velvet Face
"Flowerss"	2018	Flowerss
"All That Love Is"	2018	Flowerss
"Who Could You Be"	2019	Natural Disguise
"Boogie Juice"	2019	Natural Disguise
"Natural Disguise"	2019	Natural Disguise
"Two Of Us"	2021	Motif
"Superstition"	2021	Motif
"Last Day On Earth"	2021	Motif
"Baby"	2023	City Talk
"Cool Cat"	2023	City Talk
"Love Fire"	2023	City Talk

=== Demos ===
- "Don't Lie to Me" (2010)
- "Hide Your Eyes" (2010)
- "Erase Me" (2011)
