= Good 4 U =

2021 single by Olivia Rodrigo

Single by Olivia Rodrigo

from the album Sour
- B-side: "Enough for You" (piano version)
- Written: 2020
- Released: May 14, 2021
- Recorded: 2020
- Studio: Amusement (Los Angeles)
- Genre: Pop-punk; grunge; alternative rock; pop rock; power pop
- Length: 2:58
- Label: Geffen; Interscope
- Songwriters: Olivia Rodrigo; Dan Nigro; Hayley Williams; Josh Farro
- Producer: Dan Nigro

Olivia Rodrigo singles chronology
"Deja Vu" (2021)	"Good 4 U" (2021)	"Traitor" (2021)

Music video
- "Good 4 U" on YouTube

"Good 4 U" (stylized in all lowercase) is a song by American singer-songwriter Olivia Rodrigo. It was released on May 14, 2021, through Geffen and Interscope Records, as the third single from Rodrigo's debut studio album, Sour (2021). The song was written by Rodrigo and its producer, Dan Nigro, who co-produced it with Alexander 23. Three months after the track's release, Hayley Williams and Josh Farro were retrospectively given co-writing credits due to influence from Paramore's "Misery Business" (2007), with the pair to receive a combined royalty share of 50%.

Musically, "Good 4 U" has been described as an upbeat rock and pop song encompassing pop-punk, grunge, alternative rock, pop rock, and power pop. It consists of a staccato bassline, energetic electric guitars, and explosive drumming, with lyrics addressing a former lover who moved on very quickly after a breakup. The song received acclaim from music critics, who praised the instrumentation reminiscent of the 1990s and 2000s and Rodrigo's crisp songwriting. The accompanying music video features Rodrigo as a high-school cheerleader exacting revenge, visually alluding to the films Audition, The Princess Diaries, and Jennifer's Body. At the 64th Annual Grammy Awards, "Good 4 U" received a nomination for Best Music Video.

The single reached number one in 23 countries, including Australia, Germany, Canada, the United Kingdom, Ireland, and the United States; it was the second chart-topping single from Sour in many of those countries, following Rodrigo's debut single, "Drivers License" (2021). "Good 4 U" peaked within the top 10 in more than 20 territories. The song received Platinum or multi-Platinum certifications globally, as well as Diamond in France and Mexico, and ranks among the top 100 most streamed songs of all-time on Spotify with over 2.3 billion streams as of November 2024.

== Background and development ==
Rodrigo announced her debut studio album, Sour, on April 1, 2021. "Good 4 U" placed sixth on the track listing. On May 10, Rodrigo announced via her social media accounts that "Good 4 U" would become the third single from Sour on May 14, following "Drivers License" and "Deja Vu". Alongside the announcement, she revealed the song's cover artwork. Rodrigo had previously teased the song in a promotional image for "Deja Vu".

In her August 2021 Variety cover story, Rodrigo stated she came up with the song's hook in the shower. She added she did not want the entirety of Sour to be "sad piano songs", but also did not want to write a happy, "I'm in love" pop song, because "that was so far from how [she] was truly feeling at the time". Rodrigo concluded that "Good 4 U" was "really satisfying" due to its upbeat energy and danceability without sacrificing honesty and authenticity in her lyrics.

== Composition and lyrics ==
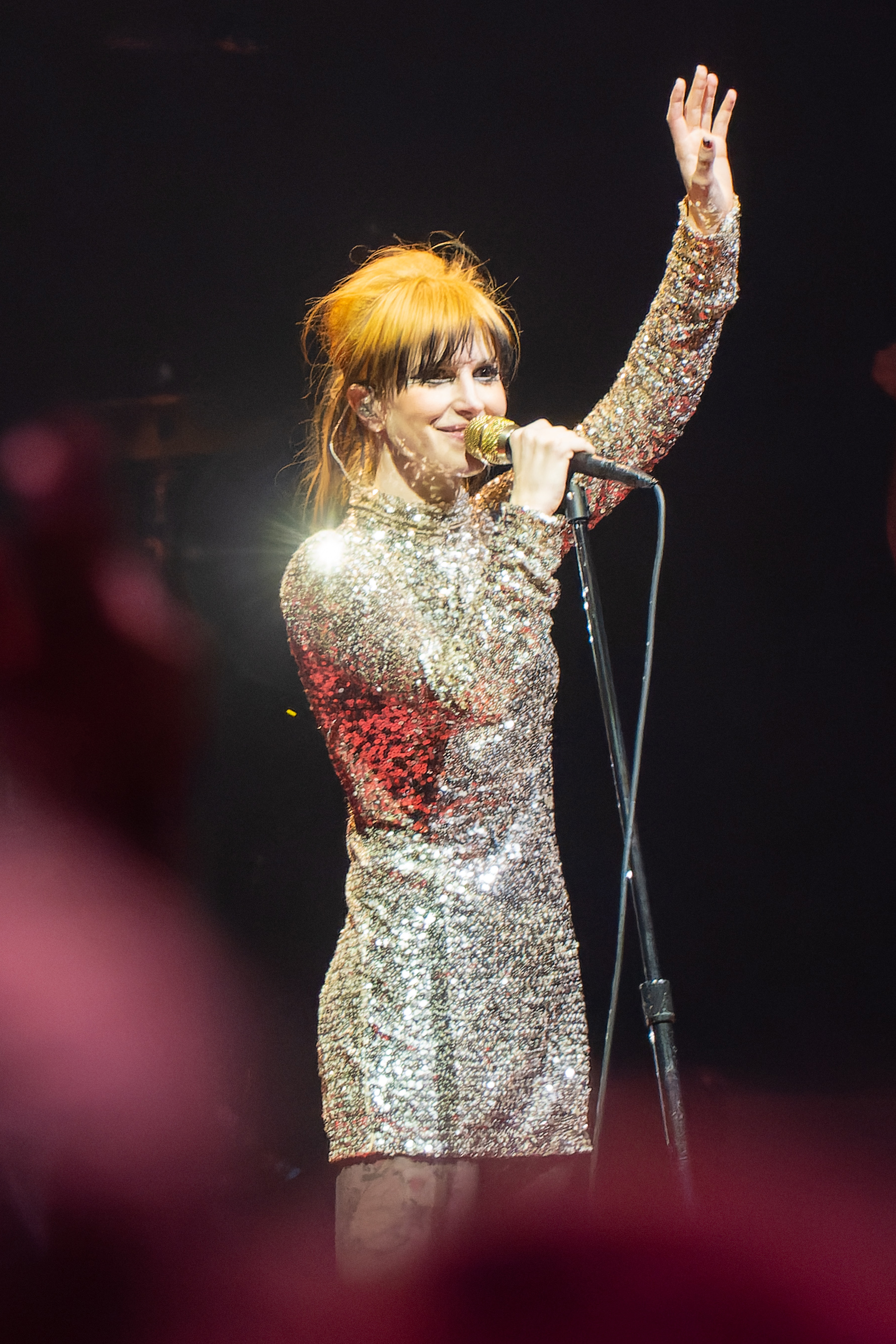
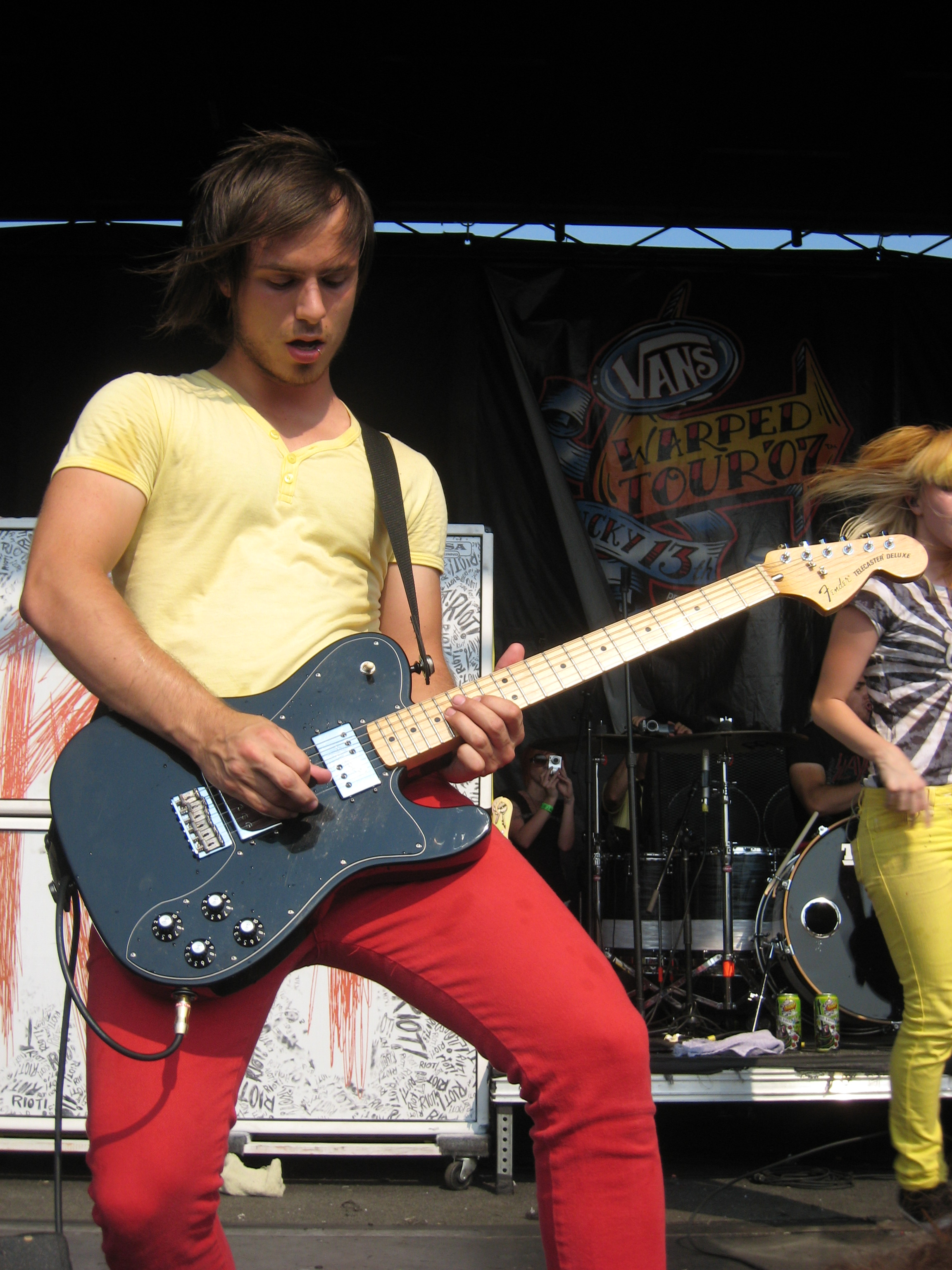
Hayley Williams (left) and Josh Farro (right) of American rock band Paramore were retrospectively credited as co-writers on "Good 4 U".

"Good 4 U" is primarily a rock and pop song in the styles of pop-punk, (Note: Attributed to multiple references:) grunge, alternative rock, pop rock, and power pop, with alternative, dance, electro, and emo influences. According to MusicNotes, it is composed in the key of F♯ minor with a tempo of 85 beats per minute. Its instrumentation is driven by a set of 1990s-inspired electric guitars and bass. Its verses follow a rhythm typical of R&B. The song was written by Rodrigo and Daniel Nigro, and produced by Nigro and Alexander 23. In August 2021, Paramore members Hayley Williams and Josh Farro received writing credits, as the chorus was inspired by Paramore's 2007 song "Misery Business". This proved to be controversial as many disputed the plagiarism claim, citing them as being two different songs with some similarities. However, it was later reported by Variety that Rodrigo's camp had been in contact with Williams and Farro prior to the song's release and they were eventually paid between US$700,000 and $1.2 million in royalties. Rodrigo publicly responded, discussing her feelings about Williams and Farro being added as co-writers on "Good 4 U":

I think it's disappointing to see people take things out of context and discredit any young woman's work. But at the end of the day, I'm just really proud and happy to say that my job is being a songwriter. All music is inspired by each other. Obviously, I write all of my lyrics from my heart and my life first. I came up with the lyrics and the melody for 'Good 4 U' one morning in the shower. What's so beautiful about music is that it can be so inspired by music that's come out in the past. Every single artist is inspired by artists who have come before them. It's sort of a fun, beautiful sharing process. Nothing in music is ever new. There's four chords in every song. That's the fun part – trying to make that your own.

"Good 4 U"
An 18-second audio sample of the song.

The song begins with an "uncluttered five-note" staccato bass line and Rodrigo's vocals delivered in a soft tone, which is then joined by an energetic guitar, using a chorus effect, before dropping into the drums-driven chorus. The second verse returns to the original bass line with added "lilting" drum beats and backup harmonies and slowly ascends to Rodrigo's "near-shout" vocal delivery.

In "Good 4 U", Rodrigo confronts her ex, who has moved on very quickly from the relationship with her, using plentiful sarcastic remarks and singing, "Well, good for you / You look happy and healthy, not me / If you ever cared to ask / Good for you / You're doin' great out there without me, baby / God, I wish that I could do that / I've lost my mind, I've spent the night / Cryin' on the floor of my bathroom / But you're so unaffected, I really don't get it / But I guess good for you." It marks a departure from Rodrigo's preceding singles, "Drivers License" and "Deja Vu", which presented a melancholic and slower emotion.

== Critical reception ==
People's Tomás Mier has described the song as a "heartbreak track filled with an angsty pop-rock sound". Rob Sheffield of Rolling Stone lauded Rodrigo's musical versatility and noted influences from Taylor Swift in "Good 4 U". Variety critic Ellise Shaffer dubbed the song a "nostalgic heartbreak anthem" evoking a "fluttering, cathartic feeling reminiscent of late '90s Hole or early Paramore, but with a poppier flair". Teen Vogue's Claire Dodson said that "Good 4 U" gives "pure 2000s pop-punk" aside Rodrigo's "knockout songwriting". Dodson found Rodrigo's voice "so versatile, easily slipping" between styles similar to Swift's vocals in "We Are Never Ever Getting Back Together" (2012) and those of Alanis Morissette and Hayley Williams "to become something original". Sydney Bucksbaum, writing for Entertainment Weekly, called the single a "pop-punk breakup anthem" and an "immediate banger", underlining the song's similarities to Paramore's "Misery Business" (2007). In agreement, Halle Kiefer of Vulture also named the song an "angry track" evocative of "Misery Business" in "the best possible way". In a critique of its genre, Slate's Chris Molanphy said "Good 4 U" is a "snarling rock number" inspired by the 2000s, adding that it is "not really rock-slash-anything. It isn't alt-rock crossed with SoundCloud rap like the recent chart-topper 'Mood' by 24kGoldn and Iann Dior, isn't guitar-based trap-pop à la Post Malone, isn't indie-rock with bedroom-pop hooks à la Taylor Swift's recent creations."

=== Rankings ===
Critical rankings
Publication	Accolade	Rank	Ref.
Genius	The 50 Best Songs of 2021	3	
NPR	The 100 Best Songs of 2021	9	
Pitchfork	The 100 Best Songs of the 2020s So Far	28	
Rolling Stone	The 200 Greatest Rock Songs of the 21st Century So Far	4	

== Accolades ==
Awards and nominations
Year	Organization	Award	Result	Ref(s)
2022	Billboard Music Awards	Top Hot 100 Song	Nominated	
2022	Billboard Music Awards	Top Streaming Song	Nominated	
2022	Billboard Music Awards	Top Radio Song	Nominated	
2022	Billboard Music Awards	Top Billboard Global 200 Song	Nominated	
2022	Brit Awards	Best International Song	Won	
2022	Grammy Awards	Best Music Video	Nominated	
2022	iHeartRadio Music Awards	TikTok Bop of the Year	Won	
2022	iHeartRadio Titanium Awards	Winning Song	Won	
2021	Meus Prêmios Nick	Challenge Hits of the Year	Nominated	
2021	Meus Prêmios Nick	Video of the Year	Nominated	
2021	MTV Millennial Awards Brazil	Global Hit	Nominated	
2021	MTV Video Music Awards	Best Pop	Nominated	
2021	MTV Video Music Awards	Song of Summer	Nominated	
2021	MTV Video Play Awards	Winning Videos	Won	
2021	Nickelodeon Mexico Kids' Choice Awards	Global Hit	Nominated	
2022	NME Awards	Best Song in the World	Nominated	
2021	NRJ Music Awards	International Song of the Year	Nominated	
2021	People's Choice Awards	Song of the Year	Nominated	
2021	People's Choice Awards	Music Video of the Year	Nominated	

== Commercial performance ==
=== United States ===
In the United States, "Good 4 U" debuted atop the Billboard Hot 100, giving Rodrigo her second number-one song in the country, following her eight-week chart-topper "Drivers License". Sour became the first debut album in history to have two of its songs debut at number one on the Hot 100, as well as the third album by a female artist to spawn two number-one debuts on the Hot 100, preceded by Mariah Carey's Daydream (1995) and Ariana Grande's Thank U, Next (2019). "Good 4 U" was also the third consecutive single from the album to debut in the top 10 of the chart. The song drew 43.2 million US streams and sold 12,000 downloads in its first week of release. It debuted atop the Streaming Songs chart as Rodrigo's second leader and ruling for seven consecutive weeks, after "Drivers License" ruled for four weeks, and started at number five on the Billboard Digital Songs chart. "Good 4 U" dropped to number two in its second week and held that rank for eleven non-consecutive weeks, becoming the first song since Whitney Houston's "Exhale (Shoop Shoop)" (1995–96) to spend eleven weeks at number two on the Hot 100. "Good 4 U" has been certified seven-times Platinum by the Recording Industry Association of America (RIAA) for shipments equaling seven million units.

=== United Kingdom ===
In the United Kingdom, "Good 4 U" was also a commercial success. The song accumulated over one million streams in its first three days in the country. It debuted at number two on the UK Singles Chart, marking Rodrigo's second top-10 song and third top-20 song in the country. In its second week, the song topped the chart, becoming Rodrigo's second number-one single after "Drivers License". "Good 4 U" became one of the UK's biggest chart-topping singles in 2021, gathering more than 117,000 units sold in its second week, including 13.5 million streams, to reach number one. It topped the charts for five consecutive weeks, in the fourth of which it became the first rock song to reach such a feat since Evanescence's "Bring Me to Life" (2003). In its seventh week, the song was dethroned by Ed Sheeran's "Bad Habits", dropping down to number two on the UK Singles Chart. After 10 weeks within the top 10 on the UK Charts, "Good 4 U" fell to number 12. "Good 4 U" spent a total of 25 weeks inside the UK Top 40 in 2021. At the end of the year, it was reported that "Good 4 U" had been streamed a total of 167 million times and was the UK's second biggest song of 2021, selling 1,390,000 copies. "Good 4 U" spent a total of 61 weeks in the UK Top 100 and has since been certified quintuple Platinum by the British Phonographic Industry (BPI) for shipments equaling three million units. The song has also been streamed a total of 253 million times.

=== Worldwide ===
In Ireland, "Good 4 U" scored Rodrigo's second number-one song on the Irish Singles Chart, following "Drivers License". With this, all singles from Sour had entered the top 10 of the chart. The song spent five consecutive weeks at number one in Ireland. "Good 4 U" further topped the singles charts in New Zealand and Singapore. In Australia, "Good 4 U" debuted at number two on the ARIA Singles Chart, after which it rose to number one upon the impact of Sour. "Good 4 U" spent six consecutive weeks at number one in Australia.

== Impact ==
British rock magazine Kerrang! stated that "Good 4 U" leads the commercial comeback of rock music in 2020 and 2021, noting how it is the first rock record since Evanescence's 2003 single "Bring Me to Life" to spend four or more weeks atop the UK Singles chart, alongside chart success of other rock-adjacent artists, such as Willow Smith, Machine Gun Kelly, Måneskin, and Miley Cyrus. Slate admired Rodrigo's versatility and proclaimed that she "might be the dying genre's best hope", pinpointing that "Good 4 U" is the "most up-the-middle rock song to top the [US] Hot 100 in a decade or more".

== Music video ==
A still of Rodrigo standing in a room that she set on fire, from the music video for "Good 4 U"

An accompanying music video directed by Petra Collins was released alongside the song on May 14, 2021. The music video references horror films such as Audition (1999) and Jennifer's Body (2009). Rodrigo was styled by vlogger Devon Carlson for the video. In the video, Rodrigo appears in a variety of looks, including a cheerleading uniform seen in the 2001 coming-of-age film The Princess Diaries (also seen in the cover artwork). She plays the role of a high schooler out for revenge, destroying her ex-boyfriend's bedroom and lighting his belongings on fire. Insider critic Callie Ahlgrim opined that the fire was a reference to Swift's music video for "Picture to Burn" (2008), which follows a similar revenge concept. In January 2025, Palisades Charter High School, where many shots of the music video were filmed, was heavily damaged by the 2025 Southern California wildfires; however, the indoor basketball court which was used heavily in the video remained largely unaffected.

== Live performances ==
Rodrigo performed "Good 4 U" for the first time on May 15, 2021, along with "Drivers License", on Saturday Night Live. On September 12, Rodrigo performed the song at the 2021 MTV Video Music Awards. An orchestral-arranged version of the song was performed by Rodrigo on her documentary film Driving Home 2 U: A Sour Film, released on March 25, 2022, for Disney+.

== Usage in media ==
The song was included on the third-season soundtrack of the Netflix series Heartstopper. In 2023, it was featured in the American romantic comedy film Zoey 102, a sequel to the television series Zoey 101.

== Track listing ==
"Singles 4 You" vinyl single

1. "Good 4 U"
2. "Enough for You" (piano version)

== Credits and personnel ==
Credits adapted from the liner notes of Sour.

=== Studio locations ===
- Recorded at Amusement Studios (Los Angeles)
- Mixed at SOTA Studios (Los Angeles)
- Mastered at Sterling Sound (New York)

=== Personnel ===
- Olivia Rodrigo – songwriting, vocals, backing vocals
- Dan Nigro – songwriting, production, recording, acoustic guitar, electric guitar, bass, drum programming, synthesizer, backing vocals
- Alexander 23 – co-production, electric guitar, bass, drum programming, backing vocals
- Josh Farro – songwriting
- Hayley Williams – songwriting
- Ryan Linvill – assistant engineering
- Mitch McCarthy – mixing
- Randy Merrill – mastering

== Charts ==
=== Weekly charts ===
Weekly chart performance
Chart (2021–22)	Peak position
Argentina Hot 100 (Billboard)	27
Australia (ARIA)	1
Austria (Ö3 Austria Top 40)	1
Belgium (Ultratop 50 Flanders)	1
Belgium (Ultratop 50 Wallonia)	19
Bolivia (Monitor Latino)	18
Brazil Streaming (UBC)	6
Canada Hot 100 (Billboard)	1
Canada CHR/Top 40 (Billboard)	2
Canada Hot AC (Billboard)	6
Colombia (Promúsica)	15
Costa Rica (FONOTICA)	8
Croatia (HRT)	8
Czech Republic Airplay (ČNS IFPI)	9
Czech Republic Singles Digital (ČNS IFPI)	1
Denmark (Tracklisten)	1
Finland (Suomen virallinen lista)	3
France (SNEP)	21
Germany (GfK)	1
Global 200 (Billboard)	1
Greece (IFPI)	3
Hungary (Rádiós Top 40)	2
Hungary (Single Top 40)	12
Hungary (Stream Top 40)	1
Iceland (Tónlistinn)	3
India International Singles (IMI)	5
Ireland (IRMA)	1
Italy (FIMI)	29
Italy Airplay (EarOne)	88
Japan Hot Overseas (Billboard)	1
Lebanon (OLT20)	5
Lithuania (AGATA)	7
Malaysia (RIM)	2
Netherlands (Dutch Top 40)	1
Netherlands (Single Top 100)	1
New Zealand (Recorded Music NZ)	1
Norway (VG-lista)	1
Panama (Monitor Latino)	18
Peru (UNIMPRO)	12
Portugal (AFP)	1
Romania (Airplay 100)	78
Singapore (RIAS)	1
Slovakia Airplay (ČNS IFPI)	20
Slovakia Singles Digital (ČNS IFPI)	1
South Africa (TOSAC)	1
South Korea (Gaon)	196
Spain (Promusicae)	13
Sweden (Sverigetopplistan)	2
Switzerland (Schweizer Hitparade)	1
UK Singles (Official Charts)	1
US Billboard Hot 100	1
US Adult Contemporary (Billboard)	12
US Adult Pop Airplay (Billboard)	1
US Dance Airplay (Billboard)	16
US Pop Airplay (Billboard)	1
US Rolling Stone Top 100	1
Venezuela (Record Report)	42

=== Year-end charts ===
2021 year-end chart performance
Chart (2021)	Position
Australia (ARIA)	6
Austria (Ö3 Austria Top 40)	4
Belgium (Ultratop Flanders)	4
Belgium (Ultratop Wallonia)	69
Bolivia (Monitor Latino)	83
Brazil Streaming (Pro-Música Brasil)	80
Canada (Canadian Hot 100)	8
Denmark (Tracklisten)	16
France (SNEP)	92
Germany (Official German Charts)	10
Global 200 (Billboard)	9
Hungary (Rádiós Top 40)	50
Hungary (Single Top 40)	68
Hungary (Stream Top 40)	10
Ireland (IRMA)	3
Mexico (AMPROFON)	8
Netherlands (Dutch Top 40)	21
Netherlands (Single Top 100)	8
New Zealand (Recorded Music NZ)	7
Norway (VG-lista)	7
Portugal (AFP)	10
Puerto Rico (Monitor Latino)	82
Spain (PROMUSICAE)	82
Sweden (Sverigetopplistan)	12
Switzerland (Schweizer Hitparade)	14
UK Singles (OCC)	2
US Billboard Hot 100	5
US Adult Contemporary (Billboard)	32
US Adult Top 40 (Billboard)	10
US Mainstream Top 40 (Billboard)	6

2022 year-end chart performance
Chart (2022)	Position
Australia (ARIA)	21
Austria (Ö3 Austria Top 40)	42
Belgium (Ultratop 50 Flanders)	52
Belgium (Ultratop 50 Wallonia)	194
Canada (Canadian Hot 100)	34
Germany (Official German Charts)	65
Global 200 (Billboard)	27
New Zealand (Recorded Music NZ)	43
Switzerland (Schweizer Hitparade)	86
UK Singles (OCC)	41
US Billboard Hot 100	31
US Adult Contemporary (Billboard)	36
US Adult Top 40 (Billboard)	20
US Mainstream Top 40 (Billboard)	38

== Certifications ==
Certifications
Region	Certification	Certified units/sales
Australia (ARIA)	11× Platinum	770,000^{‡}
Austria (IFPI Austria)	4× Platinum	120,000^{‡}
Brazil (Pro-Música Brasil)	5× Diamond	800,000^{‡}
Canada (Music Canada)	Diamond	800,000^{‡}
Denmark (IFPI Danmark)	2× Platinum	180,000^{‡}
France (SNEP)	Diamond	333,333^{‡}
Germany (BVMI)	3× Gold	600,000^{‡}
Italy (FIMI)	Platinum	70,000^{‡}
Mexico (AMPROFON)	Diamond+2× Platinum	980,000^{‡}
New Zealand (RMNZ)	6× Platinum	180,000^{‡}
Norway (IFPI Norway)	2× Platinum	120,000^{‡}
Poland (ZPAV)	2× Platinum	100,000^{‡}
Portugal (AFP)	3× Platinum	30,000^{‡}
Spain (Promusicae)	2× Platinum	120,000^{‡}
United Kingdom (BPI)	5× Platinum	3,000,000^{‡}
United States (RIAA)	7× Platinum	7,000,000^{‡}
Streaming
Central America (CFC)	Gold	3,500,000^{†}
Greece (IFPI Greece)	Platinum	2,000,000^{†}
Sweden (GLF)	2× Platinum	16,000,000^{†}
^{‡} Sales+streaming figures based on certification alone.^{†} Streaming-only figures based on certification alone.

== Release history ==
Release dates and formats
Region	Date	Format(s)	Label(s)	Ref.
Various	May 14, 2021	Digital download; streaming	Geffen; Interscope	
United States	May 25, 2021	Contemporary hit radio	Geffen; Interscope	
Italy	May 28, 2021	Radio airplay	Universal	
United States	April 8, 2022	LP	Geffen	

== See also ==
- List of Billboard Hot 100 number ones of 2021
- List of highest-certified singles in Australia
