= Congress Theater =

Movie palace in Chicago, Illinois

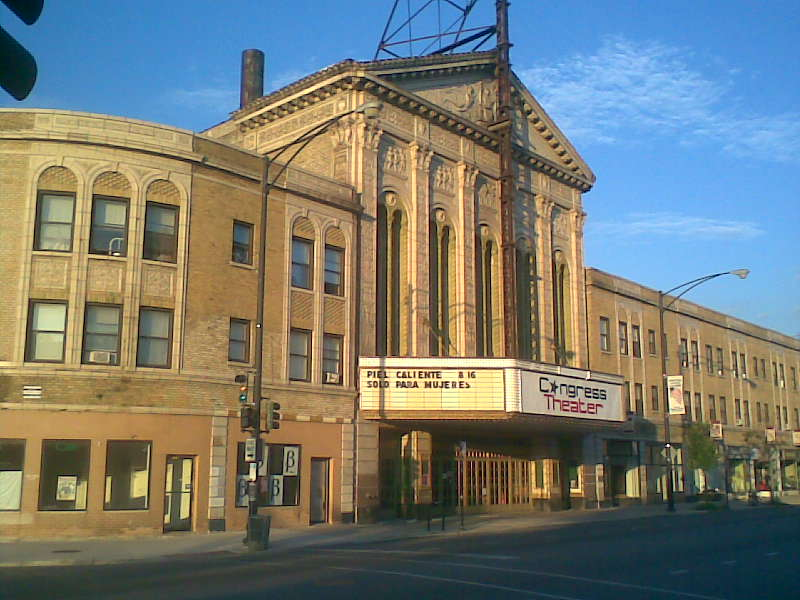
- The Congress Theater in 2008
- Interactive map of Congress Theater
- Address: 2135 N. Milwaukee Avenue; Logan Square, Chicago, Illinois; United States
- Coordinates: 41.92°N 87.69222°W
- Owner: Baum Revision
- Capacity: 2,904 (original)
- Type: Mixed-use theater block
- Current use: Closed for renovation

Construction
- Built: 1925–1926
- Opened: 1926
- Closed: April 2013
- Years active: 1926–2013
- Architects: Fridstein & Company
- Congress Theater
- U.S. National Register of Historic Places
- Chicago Landmark
- Location within Chicago Location within Illinois Location within the United States
- Area: less than one acre
- Built: 1925–1926
- Architectural style: Classical Revival, Italian Renaissance
- NRHP reference No.: 16000579

Significant dates
- Added to NRHP: January 6, 2017
- Designated CHICL: July 10, 2002

The Congress Theater is a historic movie palace in the Logan Square neighborhood of Chicago. Fridstein and Company designed the building, which was constructed in 1925–1926 for the movie theater operator Lubliner and Trinz. It features ornate exterior and interior design work in a combination of the Classical Revival and Italian Renaissance styles. The theater was designated a Chicago Landmark on July 10, 2002, and was listed on the National Register of Historic Places in 2017.

In its heyday, the Congress Theater seated 2,904 moviegoers. The theater block also had 17 retail storefronts with 56 apartments above. In its later years as a live music venue it was described as holding about 4,500 people.

For years the building was a popular concert venue. In April 2013 the city moved to close the theater over dozens of code and safety violations, and its liquor license was revoked the following month. It was a source of controversy due to issues such as liquor violations, a notoriously tough security team, and lax building upkeep.

After more than a decade of ownership changes and stalled redevelopment plans, the City of Chicago announced in February 2026 that financing and approvals for a complete renovation of the complex were in place, with completion targeted for December 2027.

== Notable performances and recordings ==
In May 2008, pop rock band Panic! at the Disco recorded the live album ...Live in Chicago at the theater over two nights, May 23 and 24, during the Honda Civic Tour. It was released on December 2, 2008.

In August 2008, rock band Paramore filmed the live CD/DVD The Final Riot! at the theater on August 12. It was released in November 2008 and was certified Gold in the United States and Platinum in Canada.

On March 31, 2009, VH1 Storytellers recorded a segment on blues rock band ZZ Top at the Congress Theater; the episode premiered on VH1 on June 27, 2009, and was rebroadcast on VH1 Classic and Palladia the following week.

As part of his 2012 New Year's Eve performance, producer and DJ Rusko shot the music video for the single "Somebody to Love", released via Diplo's Mad Decent record label.

== Closure and redevelopment ==
In November 2012, the owner, Eddie Carranza, defaulted on a $4 million loan. In April 2013 the city sought to have the venue closed immediately over multiple code and safety violations, and the theater's liquor license was revoked on May 24, 2013. In January 2014, Carranza confirmed that he had agreed to sell the theater to Michael Moyer, a developer involved in the restoration of the Cadillac Palace Theatre, although competing legal claims left the sale unresolved. Moyer acquired the building in 2015 and announced a $65 million renovation, but the work did not proceed and he later defaulted on his loans.

Baum Revision took over the stalled redevelopment in 2021. The Chicago City Council had approved a redevelopment agreement for the property in March 2019, covering rehabilitation of the theater and construction of residential units on North Rockwell Street and Milwaukee Avenue. The reported budget later rose to $88 million, supported by tax increment financing. As planned, the project would substantially rehabilitate the approximately 160,000-square-foot (15,000 m^{2}) theater property, restoring the auditorium as a 3,500-capacity music and event venue, adding 16 affordable residential rental units on the upper levels, and providing approximately 13,000 square feet (1,200 m^{2}) of ground-floor retail and office space, with 75 percent of that space reserved for locally owned businesses, community organizations, and local artists at affordable rates. Woodhouse Tinucci Architects was engaged as project architect.

In early December 2024, the Commission on Chicago Landmarks approved $6.2 million in Class L tax incentives for the first 12 years of the project. Construction was slated to begin in the first quarter of 2025, with completion by the end of 2026. The following week, workers began installing safety fencing on the roof in preparation for the first stage of restoration work, and a new exterior roof was installed. That timeline subsequently slipped, and the project sought additional funding sources.

In January 2026, the City Council approved a measure authorizing a $25 million United States Department of Housing and Urban Development Section 108 loan, and by late February the financing was in place, clearing the way for the project to go forward. Baum Revision is slated to repay the loan and all costs over a 20-year period. The project includes 16 units of affordable housing and 13,000 square feet (1,200 m^{2}) of commercial space targeted to local businesses and non-profit groups. The announced completion date is December 2027.

== Gallery ==
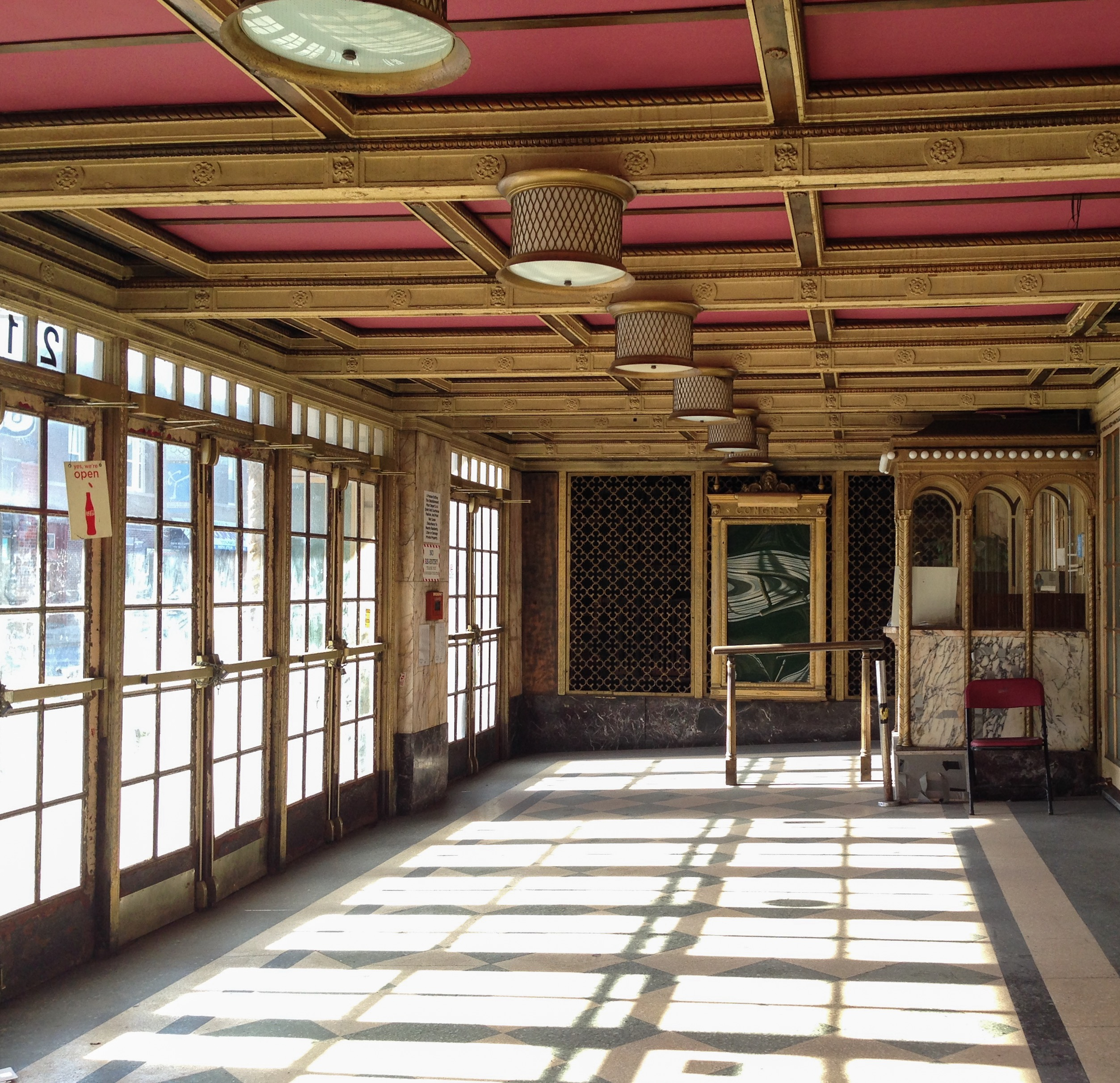
Storm lobby of the theater

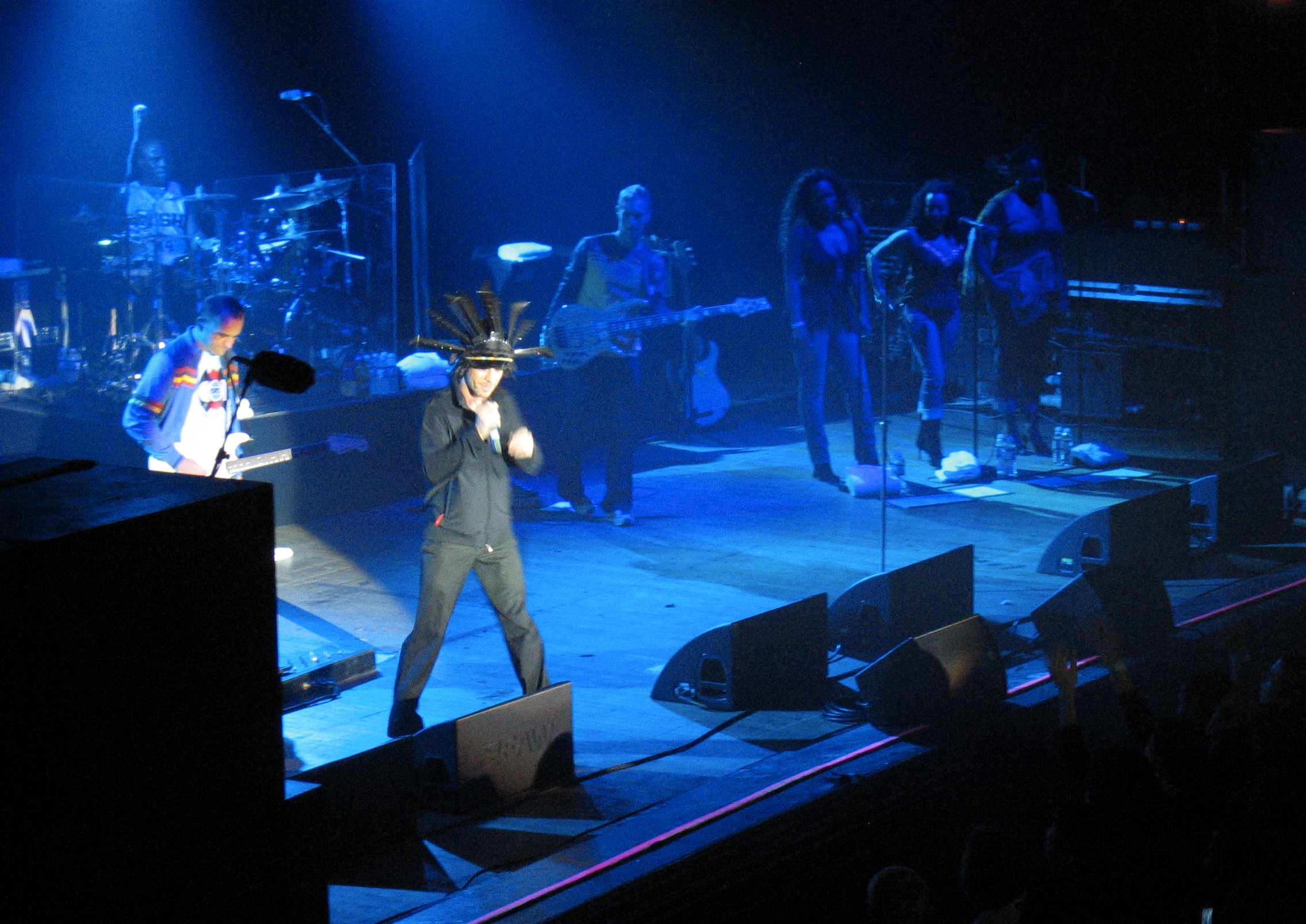
Jamiroquai performing at the Congress on October 30, 2005

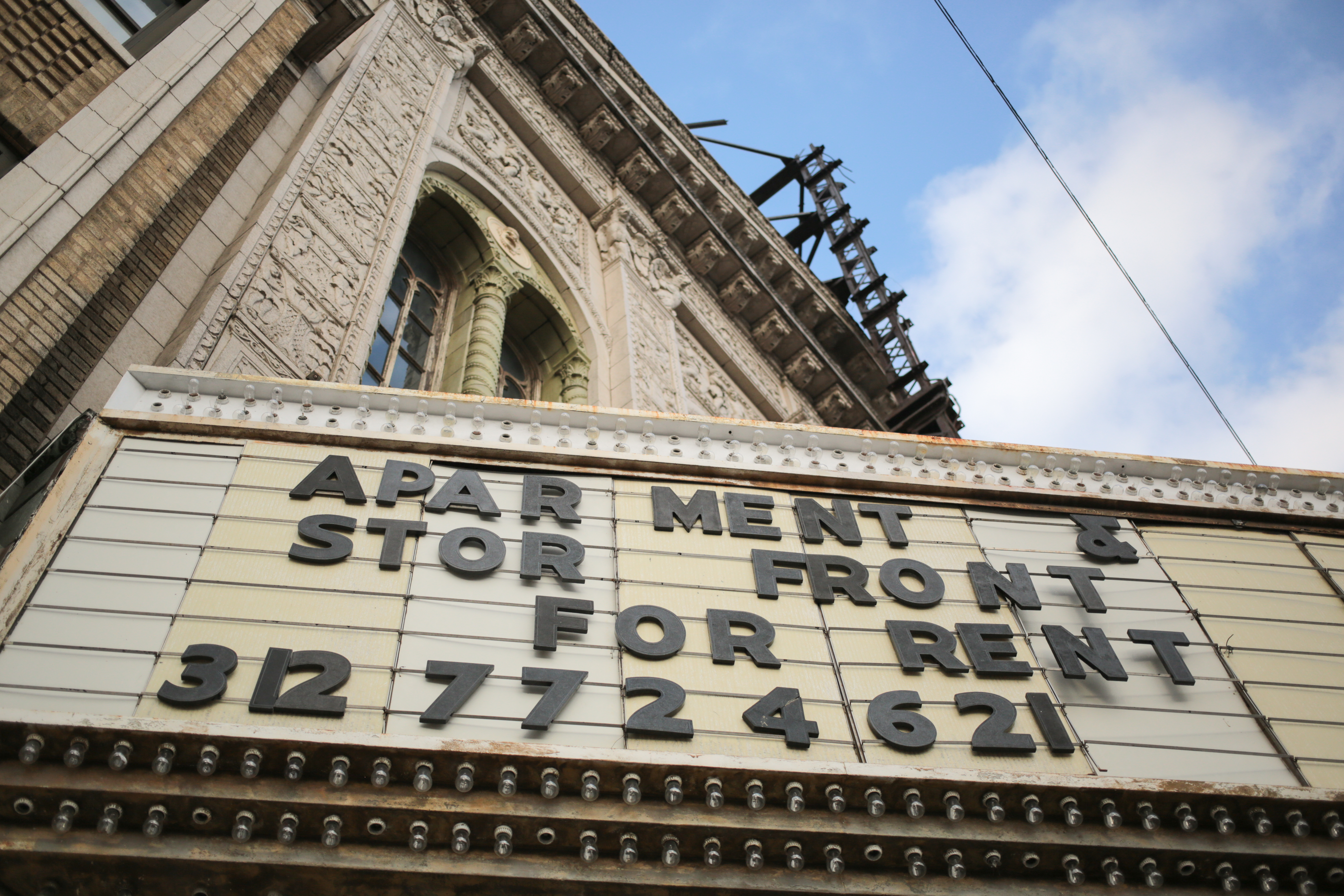
The theater in 2013
