= The Greatest Part =

Studio album by Becca Mancari
- Released: June 26, 2020
- Studios: The Fatherland Studio, Nashville, Tennessee
- Genre: Indie folk
- Length: 32:54
- Label: Captured Tracks
- Producer: Zac Farro

Becca Mancari chronology
Good Woman (2017)	The Greatest Part (2020)	Left Hand (2023)

Singles from The Greatest Part
- 1. "Hunter" Released: April 7, 2020; 2. "First Time" Released: May 6, 2020; 3. "Lonely Boy" Released: June 6, 2020

Professional ratings
Review scores
Source	Rating
AllMusic	3.5/5 stars
Consequence of Sound	B+
Loud and Quiet	8/10
Louder Than War	9/10

The Greatest Part is the second studio album by American indie folk musician Becca Mancari. It was released on June 26, 2020, by Captured Tracks.

== Release ==
On April 7, 2020, Mancari released the first single "Hunter". The single was produced by Paramore drummer Zac Farro.

On May 6, 2020, Mancari announced the release of her second studio album, along with the second single from the album "First Time".

The third single "Lonely Boy" was released on June 9, 2020.

Mancari released the video clip to "Tear Us Apart" on July 9, 2020.

== Critical reception ==
Marcy Donelson of AllMusic wrote "The Greatest Part pretty seamlessly shifts the balance away from more folk-leaning elements toward keyboards and catchier choruses without losing the warm, dreamy quality of her sound. Having entered recording sessions with the goal of making "sad pop music," Mancari effectively accomplishes that aim on an album that keeps its melodies, rhythms, and the palette bright and welcoming." Writing for Consequence of Sound, Jennifer Irving wrote: "The Greatest Part earns its place as a second record that is a definitive step forward, specifically musically. It’s a fantastic album to lay around the house and do nothing while listening, and yet it’s no stranger to provoking thoughtful conversations with its lyrical content. Although the energy at the beginning of the album stands tallest, Mancari’s more stripped-down tracks towards the end showcase her proficiency in crafting different sounds."

=== Accolades ===
Accolades for The Greatest Part
Publication	Accolade	Rank
Consequence of Sound	Top 50 Albums of 2020	43

== Track listing ==
No.	Title	Music	Length
1.	"Hunter"	Zac Farro; Becca Mancari	2:49
2.	"First Time"	Becca Mancari	2:43
3.	"Like This"	Zac Farro; Becca Mancari	2:23
4.	"Bad Feeling"	Becca Mancari	2:34
5.	"Pretend"	Zac Farro; Becca Mancari	2:13
6.	"Lonely Boy"	Zac Farro; Becca Mancari	3:05
7.	"Tear Us Apart"	Becca Mancari	2:35
8.	"I’m Sorry"	Becca Mancari	2:29
9.	"Stay With Me"	Becca Mancari	4:41
10.	"Knew"	Becca Mancari	4:33
11.	"Forgiveness"	Becca Mancari	2:49

== Personnel ==
Musicians

- Becca Mancari – primary artist
- Julien Baker – backing vocals
- Zac Farro – guitar, bass, drums, producer
- Juan Solorzano – guitar
- Joey Howard – bass
- Adam Schatz – keyboard
- Benjamin Kaufman – strings

Production

- Dave Cooley – mastering
- Carlos de la Garza – mixing
