= Riot! =

- Standard edition cover (Note: Some CD editions of the album contain the album's title in the top corner and a picture of the band. The MVI (music video interactive)+CD re-release features a different picture.)

Studio album by Paramore
- Released: June 12, 2007
- Recorded: January–April 2007
- Studios: House of Loud (Elmwood Park, New Jersey); Bennett Studios (Englewood, New Jersey)
- Genres: Alternative rock; pop-punk; emo; power pop; pop rock
- Length: 38:58
- Label: Fueled by Ramen
- Producer: David Bendeth

Paramore chronology
The Summer Tic EP (2006)	Riot! (2007)	The Final Riot! (2008)

Singles from Riot!
- 1. "Misery Business" Released: June 4, 2007; 2. "Hallelujah" Released: September 10, 2007; 3. "Crushcrushcrush" Released: November 26, 2007; 4. "That's What You Get" Released: March 25, 2008

Riot! is the second studio album by the American rock band Paramore. It was released in the United States on June 12, 2007, through Fueled by Ramen as a follow-up to the band's debut album, All We Know Is Falling (2005). The album was produced by David Bendeth and written primarily by band members Hayley Williams and Josh Farro, with Bendeth. The album explores a "diverse range of styles", while not straying far from the "signature sound" of their debut album, with several critics comparing it to the music of Kelly Clarkson and Avril Lavigne.

Riot! received generally positive reviews from music critics, who praised its sound and catchiness, and noted its "crossover potential". The album was successful in the United States, reaching number fifteen on the Billboard 200 and being certified triple-platinum on April 20, 2021, by the Recording Industry Association of America (RIAA). It was also certified double-platinum in New Zealand by Recorded Music NZ and the United Kingdom by the British Phonographic Industry (BPI), platinum in Australia by the Australian Recording Industry Association (ARIA), and gold in Canada by Music Canada. Its lead single, "Misery Business", reached top-thirty and forty positions in the US and is considered the band's breakthrough hit, credited with introducing the band to a mainstream audience. Its third and fourth singles, "Crushcrushcrush", and "That's What You Get", were also successful, with both achieving a platinum certification by the RIAA.

== Background and recording ==
Before work began on Paramore's next album, bassist Jeremy Davis was expelled from the band due to "his lack of work ethic and participation in things that [the rest of the band] didn't agree with," according to guitarist Josh Farro. Following his departure, Farro and his brother, drummer Zac Farro, convinced lead vocalist Hayley Williams to bring Taylor York as guitarist, although Williams insisted on Davis' reinstatement in the band. After an agreement involving the remaining three members, Davis was reinstated as bassist, and York became the band's touring guitarist only. York had been in a band with the Farro brothers before the two met Williams.

Williams explained that the album was titled Riot! because during the writing process their "thoughts and emotions were coming out so fast that we couldn't control them," comparing it to a riot. Williams also commented on the band's evolution with the album, stating, "I think our intention for [All We Know Is Falling] would have been for it to be everything that Riot! is, but there wasn't any time to make that record back then." After being courted by producers Neal Avron and Howard Benson, Paramore opted to record the album with producer David Bendeth in New Jersey, who had previously worked with Your Vegas and Breaking Benjamin.

The album was recorded from January to April 2007 at the House of Loud and Bennett Studios; the former served as the mixing location, while the latter was used for the recording of piano arrangements. It was produced and mixed by David Bendeth, and mastered by Ted Jensen at Sterling Sound. During production, Paramore held an online contest titled "The Last Song You'll Ever Sing", where fans submitted videos on YouTube for the opportunity to sing backing vocals on the track "Born for This". The winner was Mary Bonney of McLean, Virginia.

== Music and style ==
Williams classified Riot! as "raw energy," which she considered development of their debut album. The first track "For a Pessimist I'm Pretty Optimistic" comes from what lead guitarist Josh Farro reflects as "putting your faith in someone and they blow it." Farro composed the music for the song and gave the demo to Williams to write the lyrics. The origins of "Misery Business" came from a message Williams posted on the band's LiveJournal, asking fans to post about what they were ashamed of. She found out that most of them "were reaching out to someone to spill their guts to," which she recalled being an inspiration for the honest songwriting of the song.

Williams recounted that "Hallelujah" is one of the band's oldest songs, but they felt it fit better in Riot!. She described the song as "a claim of victory for both ourselves and our fans." The eleventh track "Born for This" contains the line "we want the airwaves back", from the song "Liberation Frequency" in the album The Shape of Punk to Come by the influential Swedish hardcore band Refused. Williams has explained that this song was written "about the fans" and "that the whole pre-chorus is actually inspired by that one line of the song."

Ian Cohen of MTV Hive described the album as "classic alt-rock with a distinctly Fueled By Ramen edge." Cam Lindsay at Exclaim! characterized it as "high-energy/high-emotion pop-punk," while AllMusic's Jason Lymangrover states "[Williams] fills the majority of her punk-pop tales with emo angst and declarations of boy woes." It is also declared as one of 2007's most popular emo pop albums by Andrew Leahey of AllMusic. Jonathan Bradley at Stylus Magazine labeled it as "irrepressible power pop". Alternative Press wrote "Paramore...have created 11 more-than-competent pop-rock numbers."

== Release and promotion ==
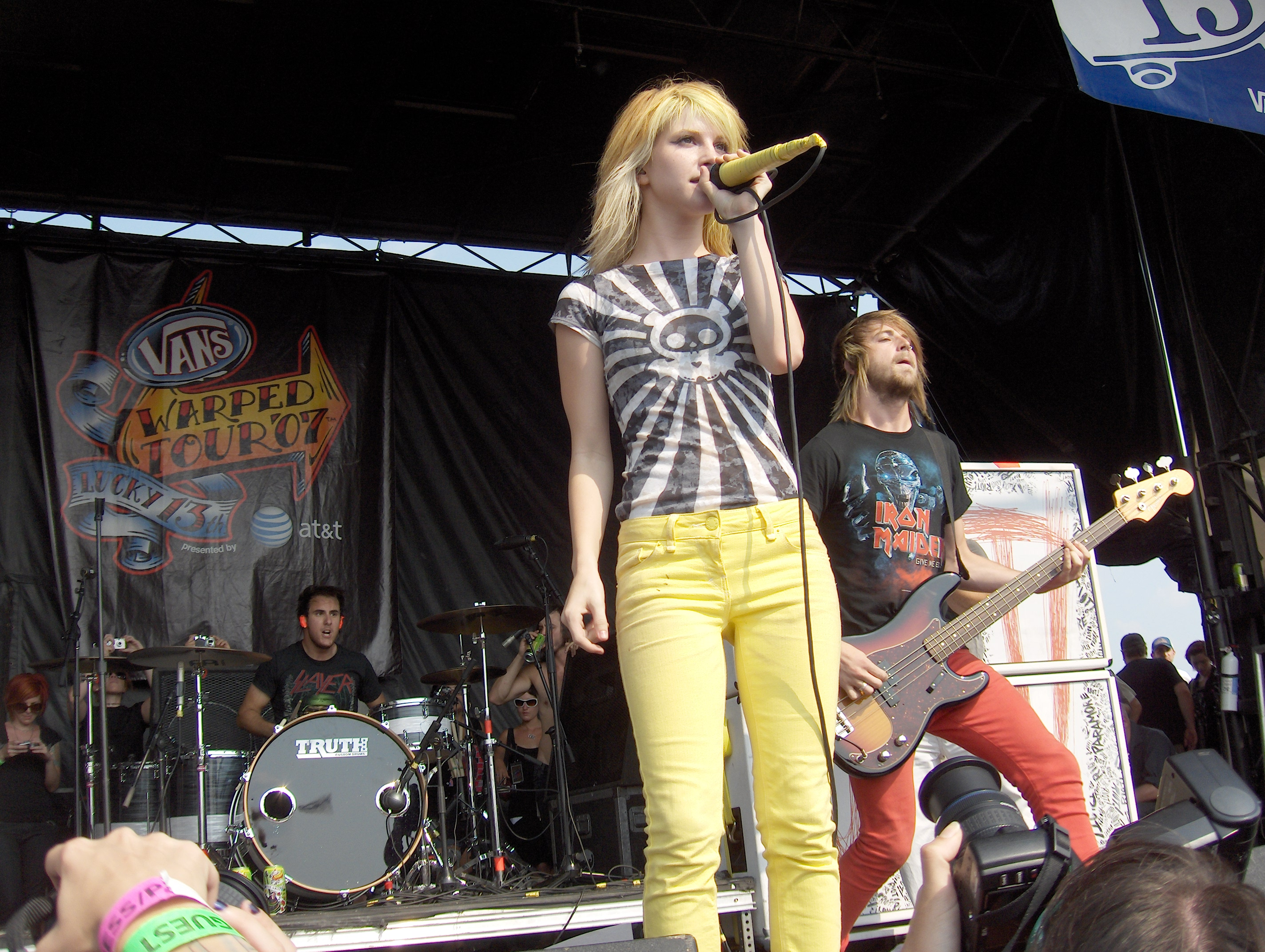
Paramore performing at the 2007 Vans Warped Tour in Camden, New Jersey

On March 13, 2007, it was announced that guitarist Hunter Lamb left the group to focus on family. On April 13, "Misery Business" was made available for streaming. A week later, the album's cover art and track listing was revealed. In April and May, the band went on headlining tour of the U.S. They were supported by the Almost, This Providence, Love Arcade and Quietdrive. Riot! was released through Fueled by Ramen on June 12, following the debut of "Misery Business" on the radio. From late June to late August, the band went on the 2007 edition of Warped Tour. In October and November, the group went on a co-headlining US tour with the Starting Line. Set Your Goals opened the first half of the tour, while the Almost opened the second half. The album was re-released in late 2007 as a MVI (music video interactive) CD/DVD, which includes the ability to remix Crushcrushcrush and Misery Business using the program U-MYX and includes music videos as well as live videos, lyrics and digital liner notes. The album has yielded four singles, with "Misery Business" being the first. The album's second single was "Hallelujah". The album's third single was "Crushcrushcrush", released on January 15, 2008, in the US and January 23 in the UK.

The album's fourth single, "That's What You Get", was released just over a week after Paramore cancelled their European tour to work on "personal issues", amidst media speculation of the band breaking up. For the single's video shoot, Williams explained that, given the fragile state of the band, they all thought it best if they kept things low-key, surrounding themselves with their friends and family and keeping it simple. Williams added, "We had tons of friends there, and it really just felt like a hangout session. And Marcos [Siega, the director] was so cool about it. He said, 'Bring your friends.' We shot it in some of our friends' houses, and it just felt so real... and I think it's the first time in a video you're gonna get to see who we really are." Williams had stated, "We're hoping to do one more tour across the States before we really get started with all the (European summer) festivals. Of course, I want to do more Warped Tour dates, 'cause it's, like, my favorite tour ever. We'll see what works out and hopefully just have another great year." In early April, the band appeared at the Bamboozle Left festival. In April and May, the band went on a co-headlining US tour with Jimmy Eat World. In July, the band performed on the 2008 edition of Warped Tour for a week. In July and August, the band went on a US tour with Jack's Mannequin, Paper Route and Phantom Planet.

== Critical reception ==
Professional ratings
Aggregate scores
Source	Rating
Metacritic	67/100
Review scores
Source	Rating
AllMusic	4/5 stars
Alternative Press	3/5 stars
Blender	3/5 stars
Drowned in Sound	4/10
IGN	7/10
NME	5/10
Pitchfork	8.8/10
Spin	3.5/5 stars
Sputnikmusic	3.5/5 stars
Stylus Magazine	B+

Riot! received generally positive reviews from music critics. According to Metacritic, the album holds a score of 67 out of 100, indicating "generally favorable reviews" based on 8 reviews. Jason Lymangrover of AllMusic stated "Filled with crossover potential, the songs are consistent and zippy with catchy hooks in the vein of Boys Like Girls fronted by a young Shirley Manson." At Stylus Magazine, Jonathan Bradley opined that "Riot! is immediately appealing because it focuses on sounds that have been neglected by the genre's front-runners. This is an uncomplicated album of strikingly uncomplicated music, entirely lacking in 15 word song titles." Bradley also compared it to the "better songs" from Kelly Clarkson and Avril Lavigne. Gareth Dobson at Drowned in Sound observed "At 38 minutes long, it's mercifully brief, but still manages to feel like a double album for those who endure it. That is, those who don't manage to forget that it's on the stereo at all. People, get your pop-punk thrills somewhere else. At least somewhere where there are actual thrills to be had."

IGN's Ed Thompson stated "This is by no means a must have album and is not going to be remembered as the band's defining moment by any stretch of the imagination. But what Riot! will do is serve as a foundation from which the kids can continue to learn, grow and improve." Thompson also commented that it shows more maturity compared to similar bands. Lewis P. at Sputnikmusic described it as the best pop-punk album of 2007, commenting "Paramore might not be tapping into anything new, but it has finally hit its stride, making pop-punk anthems that match the praise." Alternative Press writer Scott Heisel commented "considering the median age of the band, the musicianship shown on Riot! is mightily impressive...while the record as a whole may not be a home run, it's solid stand-up double that keeps Fueled By Ramen's inning alive for their next clean-up hitter." Justin Mabee at Jesus Freak Hideout declared "While this new album may lack some of the spiritual depth that rocked their debut, the whole record retains a very positive feeling to it" Mabee commented that the band "has come a long way" with the album since they have formed. Pitchfork's Jenn Pelly in her conclusion summarized the album as "biting songs of brokenness and strength reproduced the feeling eternally: of not being alone in your pain or fury, of being out of step together—the most enduring definition of emo [Williams'] generation would offer."

=== Accolades ===
The album was included in Rock Sound's 101 Modern Classics list at number 10. The album was included at number 16 on Rock Sound's "The 51 Most Essential Pop Punk Albums of All Time" list. Stylus Magazine listed it at number 49 in their top 50 albums of 2007. In 2023, the album was included at number 26 on Loudwire's "100 Best Rock And Metal Albums Of The 21st Century" list.

== Commercial performance ==
Riot! entered the U.S. Billboard 200 albums chart at number 20 in late 2007. The album sold 42,000 copies in the U.S. in its first week, and peaked at number 15 on the Billboard 200 three months later. It was certified triple-platinum by the Recording Industry Association of America (RIAA) on April 20, 2021. The album achieved success in the UK, reaching number 24 on the UK Albums Chart and later being certified double platinum for sales of over 600,000 units. In New Zealand, the album peaked at number 15 and was certified double-platinum on June 26, 2025, selling over 30,000 units. "Misery Business" became a hit, spending 22 weeks at number 3 on the Alternative Airplay chart. The song has been certified 6× platinum by the RIAA.

== Track listing ==
All tracks are written by Hayley Williams and Josh Farro, except where noted.

Standard edition
No.	Title	Writer(s)	Length
1.	"For a Pessimist, I'm Pretty Optimistic"		3:48
2.	"That's What You Get"	Hayley Williams; Josh Farro; Taylor York	3:40
3.	"Hallelujah"		3:23
4.	"Misery Business"		3:31
5.	"When It Rains"	Williams; Josh Farro; Zac Farro	3:35
6.	"Let the Flames Begin"		3:18
7.	"Miracle"		3:29
8.	"Crushcrushcrush"		3:09
9.	"We Are Broken"	Williams; Josh Farro; David Bendeth	3:38
10.	"Fences"	Williams; Josh Farro; Bendeth	3:18
11.	"Born for This"	Williams; Josh Farro; Dennis Lyxzén; Jon Brännström; Kristofer Steen (Note: The track interpolates "Liberation Frequency" by Refused.)	3:58
Total length:			38:58

Special/Limited edition MVI bonus tracks (music video interactive)
No.	Title	Writer(s)	Length
12.	"When It Rains" (demo)	Williams; Josh Farro; Zac Farro	3:24
13.	"Misery Business" (acoustic – live from Q101 Chicago)		3:17
14.	"Pressure" (acoustic – live from Q101 Chicago)		3:01
15.	"For a Pessimist, I'm Pretty Optimistic" (live from London)		3:59
16.	"Born for This" (live from London)	Williams; Josh Farro; Lyxzén; Brännström; Steen	4:20

iTunes/Amazon.com MP3 release bonus track
No.	Title	Length
12.	"Misery Business" (acoustic)	3:14

Fueled by Ramen webstore release bonus track
No.	Title	Length
12.	"Temporary" (demo)	3:24

Hot Topic release bonus track
No.	Title	Writer(s)	Length
12.	"Decoy"	Williams; Josh Farro; Leeland Dayton Mooring	3:17

Rhapsody release bonus track
No.	Title	Writer(s)	Length
12.	"Misery Business" (acoustic)		3:16
13.	"My Hero" (electronic mix, Foo Fighters cover)	Dave Grohl; Nate Mendel; Pat Smear	3:32

Japanese, Best Buy, iTunes UK, and iTunes deluxe release bonus track
No.	Title	Writer(s)	Length
12.	"Stop This Song (Lovesick Melody)"	Williams; Josh Farro; Zac Farro; York	3:23

Best Buy, iTunes UK, and iTunes deluxe release bonus track
No.	Title	Length
13.	"Rewind" (demo)	3:47

iTunes deluxe edition bonus track
No.	Title	Length
12.	"Misery Business" (acoustic version)	3:14
13.	"Misery Business" (live from London, video)	3:47

Live in UK in 2008 bonus track
No.	Title	Length
1.	"crushcrushcrush"	3:34

== Personnel ==
Personnel adapted from Riot! liner notes

Paramore

- Hayley Williams – lead vocals
- Josh Farro – guitar, background vocals (1–4, 7–9, 11)
- Jeremy Davis – bass, (Note: Jeremy Davis was fired from the band before the instrumental tracks were recorded. Brian Weaver recorded the bass tracks. Davis rejoined the band in time to record vocal tracks for three songs.) background vocals (2, 8, 11)
- Zac Farro – drums, background vocals (2, 8, 11)

Additional musicians

- Sebastian Davin – piano (5, 9, 10)
- Steve "Untitled" Smith – backing vocals (2)
- Bekah Sheets – backing vocals (8)
- Mary Booney, Kate Booney, Kathleen Smith, Sarah Wood, Carl Delbuono, Derek Robinson, Taylor Robinson – backing vocals (11)
- Brian Weaver – bass (all tracks)
- Boots – additional drums and keys programming (3, 8)
- John Freund – Hammond organ (5, 9)
- Mariachi Real de Mexico – Mariachi music (4)

Production

- John Bender – digital editing, engineer, vocal producer, strings and arrangement (9), backing vocals (3)
- David Bendeth – producer, mixer, writer, arranger, percussion, loops, synthesizer
- Dan Korneff – digital editing, engineer
- Tim Flanzbaum – assistant engineer, digital editing
- Kato Khandwala – audio engineer
- Ted Jensen – mastering at Sterling Sound Studios
- Isaiah Abolin – assistant mixing engineer

Artwork

- Mark Obriski – art direction and album design
- Josh Rothstein – photography

== Charts ==
=== Weekly charts ===
Chart (2007)	Peak position
Australian Albums (ARIA)	47
Austrian Albums (Ö3 Austria)	66
Belgian Albums (Ultratop Flanders)	59
Dutch Albums (Album Top 100)	61
German Albums (Offizielle Top 100)	63
Finnish Albums (Suomen virallinen lista)	26
Irish Albums (IRMA)	53
Mexican Albums (Top 100 Mexico)	31
New Zealand Albums (RMNZ)	15
UK Albums (Official Charts)	24
UK Rock & Metal Albums (Official Charts)	1
US Billboard 200	15
US Top Alternative Albums (Billboard)	2
US Top Rock Albums (Billboard)	4
Chart (2021)	Peak position
Scottish Albums (Official Charts)	14
Chart (2026)	Peak position
Croatian International Albums (HDU)	23

=== Year-end charts ===
Chart (2007)	Position
UK Albums (OCC)	171
US Billboard 200	132
US Top Rock Albums (Billboard)	22

Chart (2008)	Position
UK Albums (OCC)	164

Chart (2009)	Position
UK Albums (OCC)	185

== Certifications ==
Region	Certification	Certified units/sales
Australia (ARIA)	Platinum	70,000^{‡}
Canada (Music Canada)	Gold	50,000^{^}
New Zealand (RMNZ)	2× Platinum	30,000^{‡}
United Kingdom (BPI)	2× Platinum	600,000^{‡}
United States (RIAA)	3× Platinum	3,000,000^{‡}
^{^} Shipments figures based on certification alone.^{‡} Sales+streaming figures based on certification alone.
