= Misery Business =

2007 single by Paramore

- CD single cover art

Single by Paramore

from the album Riot!
- B-side: "Stop This Song (Lovesick Melody)"; "My Hero"; "Sunday Bloody Sunday"
- Released: June 4, 2007
- Recorded: 2007
- Studio: The House of Loud (New Jersey)
- Genre: Pop-punk; emo; alternative rock
- Length: 3:31
- Label: Fueled by Ramen
- Songwriters: Hayley Williams; Josh Farro
- Producer: David Bendeth

Paramore singles chronology
"All We Know" (2006)	"Misery Business" (2007)	"Hallelujah" (2007)

Music video
- "Misery Business" on YouTube

"Misery Business" is a song by the American rock band Paramore from their second studio album, Riot! (2007) and serves as the lead single from the album. The song was written about a past experience of the band's lead singer, Hayley Williams, which involved a male friend who she felt was being exploited by a girl; when Williams and her friend dated afterwards, she wrote the song in order to "finally explain my side of the story and feel freed of it all". The accompanying music video for "Misery Business" was the third to be directed by Shane Drake for the band, and Alternative Press named "Misery Business" the Video of the Year in 2007.

"Misery Business" is considered the band's breakthrough hit and is credited with introducing the band to a mainstream audience. The track was commercially successful, peaking on the Billboard Hot 100 at number 26 (for the week of January 12, 2008), making it the band's highest-charting single until "The Only Exception" reached number 24 in 2010. It also peaked at number three on the Hot Modern Rock Tracks chart. It was the group's first charting single in the UK with more than 20,000 copies sold within less than a year of the song's release. It also was a commercial success in many countries including Mexico, Argentina, Chile, and Brazil. On June 2, 2022, the song was certified six times platinum in the United States by the RIAA, the first of the band's songs to have sold more than six million units in total.

== Concept ==
The phrase "Misery Business" was first heard in the psycho-thriller film Misery (1990). The origin of the song is ambiguous with Williams giving conflicting explanations. The Fueled by Ramen website reports that Williams wrote the song based on feedback the band received after a question she posted on the band's LiveJournal asking what people were ashamed of. However, on the band's blog, Williams claims the song was written about a past experience involving a male friend who she felt was being manipulated by a girl, and later on when Williams and her friend began to date, she penned the lyrics to "finally explain my side of the story and feel freed of it all". Later, Williams addressed the lyrics in the chorus:

But God does it feel so good
'Cause I got him where I want him now
And if you could then you know you would
'Cause God it just feels so
It just feels so good

Williams joked on Twitter on May 27, 2013, that it was about London's Heathrow Airport. In May 2020, she finally revealed that it was about bandmate Josh Farro. She told Vulture, "When I was 13 or 14 and I had a crush on Josh, he didn't like me back. He would go hang out with his girlfriend, who I wrote 'Misery Business' about because I was a dick."

== Composition ==
"Misery Business" has been described as pop-punk, emo, and alternative rock. Sheet music shows common time with a moderate tempo of 86 beats per minute, in the key of F minor. Hayley Williams' vocal range spans two octaves from F_{3} to E♭_{5}.

== Controversy ==
On September 7, 2018, Williams announced during a concert that the band will play the song "for the last time for a really long time", due to the lyric "Once a whore you’re nothing more, I’m sorry, that’ll never change", from the second verse that was deemed sexist and anti-feminist. Williams did not sing the song again until the 2022 Coachella Festival, when she performed an acoustic version with Billie Eilish. The song returned to Paramore's setlist during the band's Fall 2022 Tour. Williams no longer sings the line where she refers to the girl as a "whore" in the second verse of this song because of both the controversy it had produced and Williams since evolving in her views. Speaking on the controversial line, she said,

What I couldn't have known at the time was that I was feeding into a lie that I'd bought into, just like so many other teenagers—and many adults—before me.

== Chart performance ==
At the time of the release of "Misery Business", Paramore was a guest on MTV's "Discover and Download" which gave the band time in the spotlight to reach out and explain the purpose of their album and how they wish to see it grow. This song is the group's first single to enter the Billboard Hot 100 chart. During the week of June 25, 2007, it debuted at #99 on the chart and reached #75 two weeks later before dropping off the chart in the following week. Due to increased digital downloads during the month of August 2007, it re-entered the Billboard Hot 100 during the chart week of September 6, 2007 at #34. It reached its peak position of #26 during the chart week of January 12, 2008. It was the band's highest-charting single at that time, prior to the release of "Ain't It Fun" in 2014, but "Misery Business" still remains the band's most-played song on the radio to date whereas Ain't It Fun never succeeded on alternative radio due to the band's change of style as well as not having the staying power "Misery Business" had, despite charting higher; leaving "Misery Business" as their most popular song to date. It peaked at #3 on the Hot Modern Rock Tracks chart. It also attained moderate crossover success, reaching #12 on Pop Songs chart and #31 on Adult Pop Songs chart. The song was certified Platinum in the U.S on September 17, 2008, with over 1,000,000 digital downloads. In December 2010 the song topped the two million mark in paid downloads. It has sold 2,464,000 copies in the US as of June 18, 2014.

The single was re-released in the UK Accorto Record Store on February 11, 2008 and included three vinyl records. To date, it has peaked at #17 on the UK Singles Chart. It is also the group's first charting single in the UK. It was a success in many countries including Mexico, Argentina, Chile, Brazil and others. It debuted on the Dutch Top 40 peaking at #28 and in Finland at #23.

In 2009, the song was certified Platinum in Australia. Selling over 15,000 copies in New Zealand, the song was certified Gold on February 1, 2008, with the shipment of over 7,500 copies.

== Critical reception ==
"Misery Business" is widely regarded as one of the band's best songs. In 2017, NME ranked the song number one on their list of the 10 greatest Paramore songs; and, in 2021, Kerrang ranked the song number five on their list of the 20 greatest Paramore songs. It has been cited as one of the best rock tracks of the 21st century and has become a staple of the emo and pop-punk genres. (Note: Multiple sources:)

== Music video ==
The music video was filmed on December 21, 2006 at Reseda High School in Reseda, California. Directed by Shane Drake, who also directed Paramore's videos for "Pressure" and "Emergency", it features a band performance at a school.

The video starts out and has cut scenes of Paramore performing the song with an assortment of "RIOT!"s (a reference to the album's name) in the background all throughout the video. At the same time, a girl (Amy Paffrath), presumably the "whore" as subject in the song, ensues terror onto students at a high school. She pushes aside cheerleaders, cuts off another girl's braid, further injures a boy in an arm sling, and ruins a relationship between a couple by kissing the boy right in front of the girl. In the end, the band members themselves confront her and Williams gives her a taste of her own medicine by taking out her bra inserts and wiping the make-up off her face, thus revealing the girl's true identity and putting an end to her egotistical reign at the high school.

The video was nominated for the "Best Video" award at the Kerrang! Awards 2007 but lost to Fall Out Boy's "This Ain't a Scene, It's an Arms Race."

Fueled by Ramen (FBR+) also released an alternate cut of the video that removes the high school clips and features only performance segments.

== Live performance ==
The band has consistently played the song live throughout their career apart from the gap where they decided to retire the song in 2018; however, the decision was reversed in 2022 with a lyrical change advancing Williams' change of perspective. It is a vital part to any show they play; for many of their shows, the band would pretend to leave and suddenly re-appear to play their final song which would be Misery Business. Williams has acknowledged this in Paramore's recent shows and has made it a recognisable custom. Although the band no longer do this, they still keep it near the end of their setlist.

Usually, in the band's live performance of the song, it is briefly paused midway in order for Williams to bring fans up to the stage to sing the rest of the song. Celebrities are also often invited to join the performance, with past participants including PinkPantheress, Lil Uzi Vert, and basketball player Stephen Curry.

The track is also played differently live; the guitar riff in the bridge was altered and a different version was played live originally by Josh Farro prior to his departure and is now taken over by Taylor York. On the last line of the verse Williams used to change the line to the following, to reference the alternate guitar riff Farro used to play. This has been reversed since his departure.

"Just watch my wildest dreams come true, not one of them- hey Josh!"

Though the band had already reinstated "Misery Business" into their setlist by that point, Paramore had no intention of playing it during their 2024 run as a supporting act on Taylor Swift's The Eras Tour. However, they were persuaded to do so by Swift herself, with the singer telling Williams,

"Everyone knows you’re a feminist. [...] You’ve got kids in the crowd who will know that song and then follow you on what comes next. They will get to hear the other songs that you’re maybe prouder of or don’t have this sticky film on, but you’re still legacy building."

== Charts ==
=== Weekly charts ===
2007–2008 weekly chart performance for "Misery Business"
Chart (2007–2008)	Peak position
Australia (ARIA)	65
Canada Hot 100 (Billboard)	67
Canada CHR/Top 40 (Billboard)	27
Canada Rock (Billboard)	35
Germany (GfK)	79
Netherlands (Dutch Top 40)	28
Scottish Singles Sales (Official Charts)	8
UK Singles (Official Charts)	17
UK Rock & Metal (Official Charts)	1
US Billboard Hot 100	26
US Pop 100 (Billboard)	16
US Adult Pop Airplay (Billboard)	31
US Alternative Airplay (Billboard)	3
US Pop Airplay (Billboard)	12

2021 weekly chart performance for "Misery Business"
Chart (2021)	Peak position
US Hot Rock & Alternative Songs (Billboard)	24

=== Year-end charts ===
Year-end chart performance for "Misery Business"
Chart (2007)	Position
US Alternative Songs (Billboard)	25

== Certifications ==
Certifications for "Misery Business"
Region	Certification	Certified units/sales
Australia (ARIA)	3× Platinum	210,000^{‡}
New Zealand (RMNZ)	3× Platinum	90,000^{‡}
United Kingdom (BPI)	3× Platinum	1,800,000^{‡}
United States (RIAA)	6× Platinum	6,000,000^{‡}
^{‡} Sales+streaming figures based on certification alone.

== In popular culture ==
=== In various media ===
- EA Sports includes "Misery Business" on the soundtracks for the video games NHL 08 and Madden NFL 27, while a marching band rendition is featured in EA Sports College Football 26. It was also used in a trailer for NHL 08; The Athletic described "Misery Business" as a "high-energy, fast-paced song that fits perfectly in the NHL 08 soundtrack".
- It was in a season 7 episode of Degrassi: The Next Generation, and is included in the Music from Degrassi: The Next Generation soundtrack.
- It is a playable track in the games Guitar Hero World Tour, in which Hayley Williams is also a playable character, as well as Saints Row 2 Rock Band 3 and Metal: Hellsinger.

=== Covers ===
- Metalcore band Sea of Treachery has covered "Misery Business". Williams has praised their cover.

=== Other references ===
- The Professional Bull Riders tour features a bull named Misery Business.

=== Interpolations ===
- Singer-songwriter Olivia Rodrigo interpolated "Misery Business" into her 2021 single "Good 4 U", for which Williams and Farro consequently received co-writing credits. However, Rodrigo did not give songwriting credits until the similarities between the two songs were noticed, leading to allegations of plagiarism. The allegation is cited as indicative of the trend wherein artists of older works are able to gain a share of the copyright of newer works via the threats of lawsuits over melodic similarities.

== Release history ==
Release dates for "Misery Business"
Country	Date	Version
United States	July 10, 2007	Original
Ireland	January 6, 2008	Re-release
United Kingdom	January 6, 2008	Re-release
