= Becca Mancari =

- Born: Staten Island, NY, US
- Genres: Folk, indie folk, indie rock
- Occupations: Singer, songwriter, guitarist
- Years active: 2017–present
- Website: beccamancari.com

Becca Mancari (/ˈmænkæri/) is an American indie folk musician and singer from Staten Island, New York, previously based in Nashville, Tennessee. Mancari is a member of the band Bermuda Triangle alongside Brittany Howard of Alabama Shakes. Mancari has released three solo albums, Good Woman, The Greatest Part, and Left Hand.

== Career ==
Mancari released their debut solo album, Good Woman, on October 6, 2017.

Good Woman is listed at number 19 on Rolling Stone's "40 Best Country and Americana Albums of 2017". The album is featured on BrooklynVegan's list titled "Five Overlooked Albums of 2017".

Mancari's second solo album, The Greatest Part, was released on June 26, 2020.

Their third solo album, Left Hand, was released on August 25, 2023. It was produced by Becca Mancari and Juan Solorzano to critical acclaim. "in a whispery, unthreatening voice that somehow isn’t overwhelmed by a brawny beat, a forthright string section or Brittany Howard’s vocal harmonies. “Don’t even worry” also sounds like “doing the work”; it's a personal promise that's underlined in the mix."

== Personal life ==
Mancari identifies as non-binary, and uses they/them and she/her pronouns.

Mancari is of Puerto-Rican and Italian descent.

== Discography ==
=== Studio albums ===
- Good Woman (2017)
- The Greatest Part (2020)
- Left Hand (2023)
