= Zac Farro =

American drummer (born 1990)

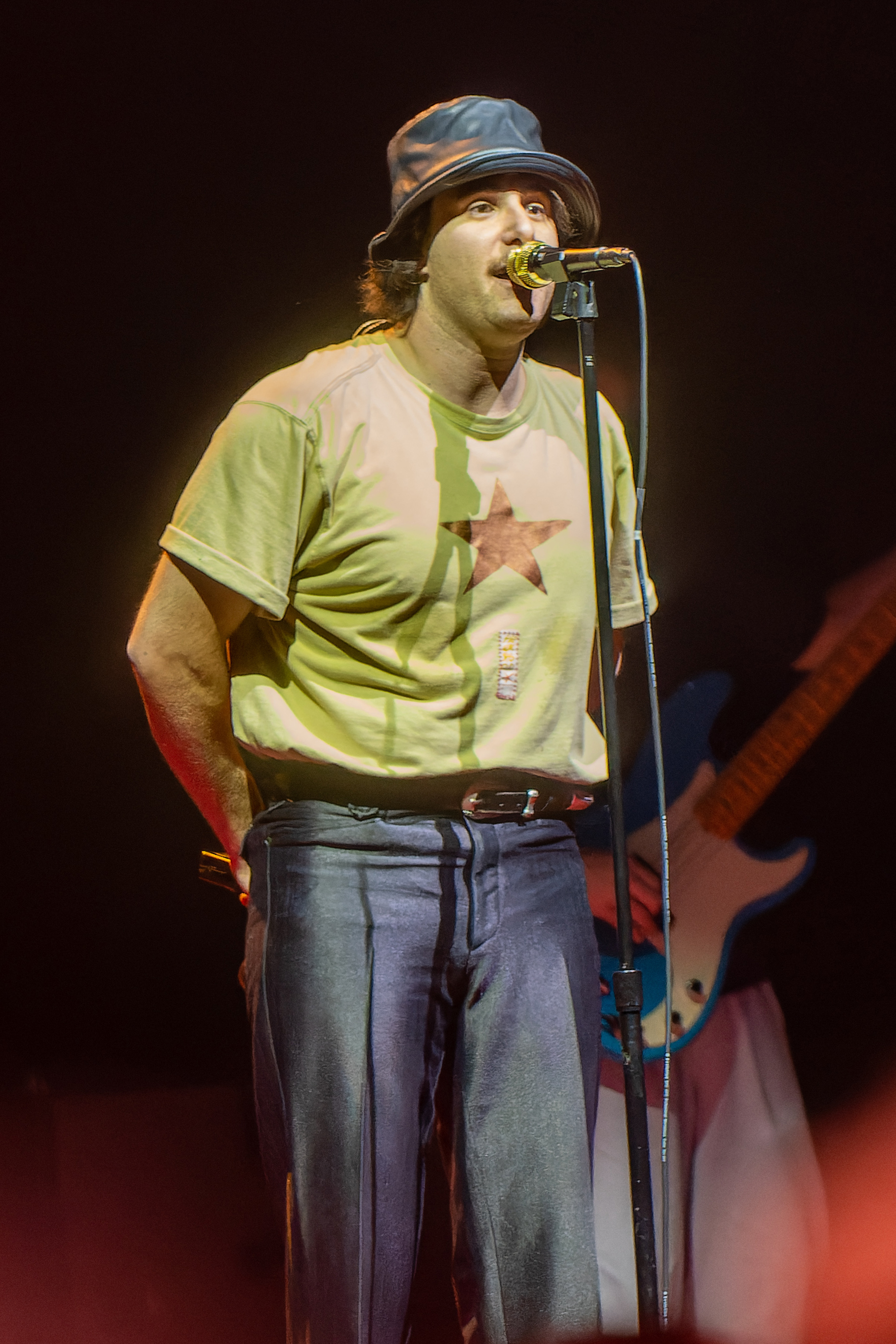
- Farro performing in 2023

Background information
- Born: Zachary Wayne Farro; June 4, 1990 (age 36); Voorhees Township, New Jersey, U.S.
- Genres: Alternative rock; pop rock; pop-punk; emo; indie pop; synth-pop; ambient
- Occupations: Musician; songwriter
- Instruments: Drums; percussion; keyboards; vocals; guitar; bass
- Years active: 2004–present
- Member of: Paramore; HalfNoise
- Formerly of: Novel American
- Website: zacfarro.co

Zachary Wayne Farro (born June 4, 1990) is an American musician, best known as the drummer for the rock band Paramore. He is the younger brother of Josh Farro, who is Paramore's former lead guitarist and backing vocalist. After he and his brother exited Paramore in 2010, Josh formed a band named Novel American, of which Zac was also a member. Farro is currently the sole member of the band HalfNoise. After being absent for Paramore, the fourth album by the band of the same name, Farro rejoined ahead of the album After Laughter in 2016.

== Early life ==
Farro was born in Voorhees Township, New Jersey. Farro is the middle child of five siblings (Nate, Joshua, Zac, Jonathan, and Isabelle). Farro began playing drums at around the age of nine, and he was eleven years old when he played his first drum kit. The family later moved to Franklin, Tennessee.

== Career ==
=== Paramore (2004–2010, 2017–present) ===
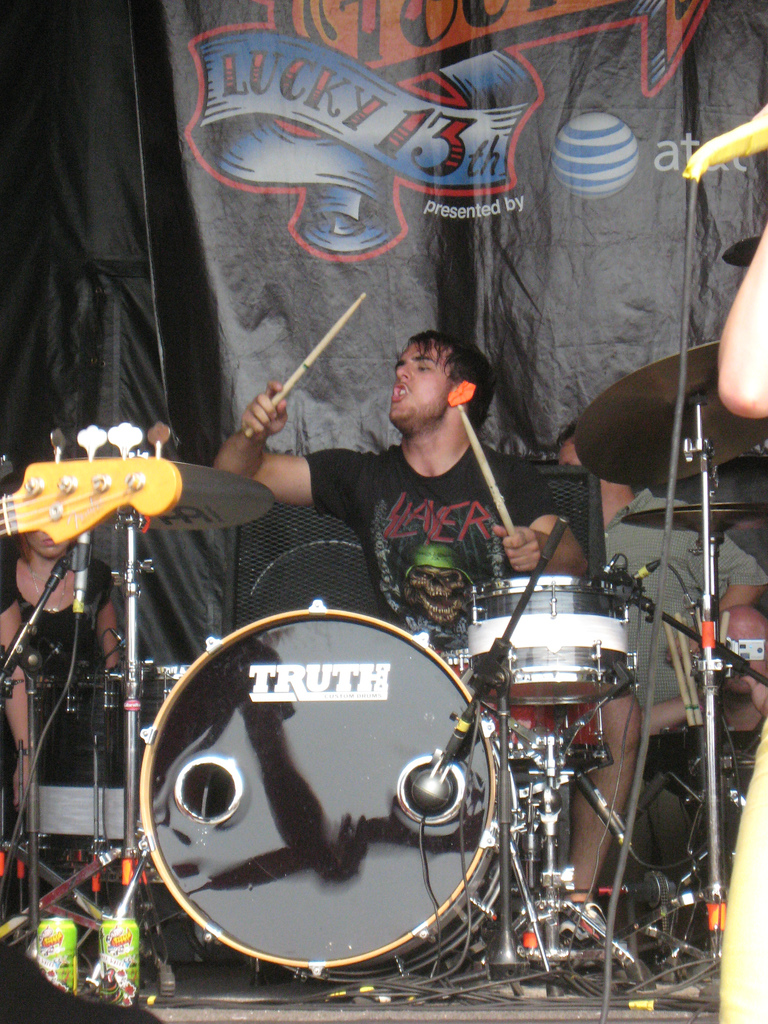
Farro performing in 2007

Farro, at age 14, was an original member of Paramore, founded in Franklin, Tennessee in 2004. The lineup included Hayley Williams (lead vocals/keyboards), Farro (drums), his older brother Josh Farro (lead guitar and backing vocals), and Jeremy Davis (bass guitar). Davis admitted he was initially unsure if the band could be taken seriously because of Zac's young age until he saw him play. The band released three studio albums, All We Know Is Falling, Riot! and Brand New Eyes, as well as two live albums and one EP. Brand New Eyes, their third album, was released on September 29, 2009. In June 2009, the band welcomed Taylor York (rhythm guitar), a long time friend of the Farros' and who previously played with them as a touring member. On December 18, 2010, the band's website announced the Farros' amicable departure. On December 21, 2010, Josh Farro released an official exit statement for himself and his brother, refuting the band's previous story.

On June 8, 2016, Paramore posted a short video of themselves, with Farro, in a studio to their social media. This was preceded by a number of images which all included both Farro and producer of the upcoming Paramore album Justin Meldal-Johnsen, leading fans and various media outlets to speculate the return of Farro. Farro later clarified that he was only recording drums for the album and that he had not rejoined the band as a full member. On August 12, in a podcast for Billboard, he commented that the most important thing to him was to reignite his friendship with the band and that being in the studio together "felt like [Farro and Paramore] haven't skipped a beat." Despite initially mentioning that he was only participating in the recording of their fifth album, it was confirmed on February 2, 2017, that Farro was back as the official drummer in the band.

He has also performed the songs 'Scooby's in the Back', 'French Class', and 'All That Love Is' by his band HalfNoise at various Paramore gigs with Hayley doing back up vocals.

=== HalfNoise (2010–present) ===
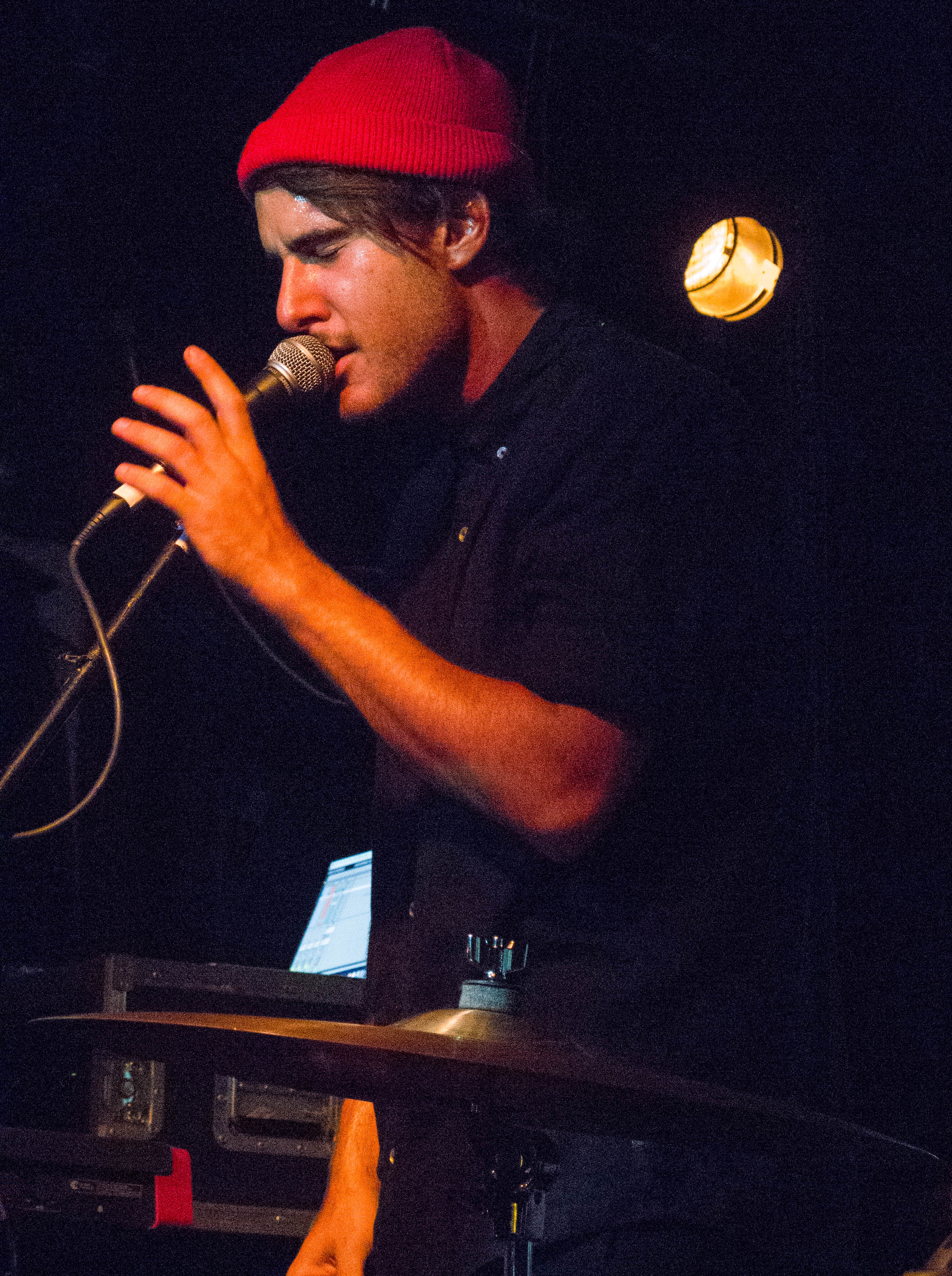
Farro performing with his solo project HalfNoise in 2015

Two days after his departure from Paramore, Zac took part in a new project band called "Tunnel", releasing a new song called "Hide Your Eyes". The duo then renamed themselves "HalfNoise" due to other bands being named "Tunnel". The band featured Farro (drums, vocals) and Jason Clark (guitar, vocals).

HalfNoise released its first single Mountain May 29, 2014. Farro also announced an album, Volcano Crowe, released on September 30, 2014.

HalfNoise released the single "Know The Feeling" on June 9, 2016, and later released a music video for the single June 23, 2016, directed by Aaron Joseph.

=== Novel American (2011–2014) ===
Josh Farro founded the band Novel American with former Cecil Adora members Van Beasley, Ryan Clark and Tyler Ward briefly after his departure from Paramore and the group announced plans to record an EP as well as play local venues in the near future.

On February 22, 2011, the band announced Zac Farro would replace Tyler Ward on drums.

On May 23, 2014, Novel American was scrapped because the band could not find a suitable lead vocalist.

=== Other work ===
In 2020 he produced the album The Greatest Part by Becca Mancari. He went to collaborate with them again in their 2023 album Left Hand.

Also in 2020, he released a photography book called In Transit.

Farro started, and runs, an indie record label called Congrats that is based in Nashville and supports local artists.

On June 24, 2025, Farro released the song "My My" and announced his solo debut album Operator. It was released on July 18, 2025.

== Musical influences ==
Farro has stated that some of his influences include: Jimmy Eat World, Radiohead, the Beatles, Pink Floyd, Death Cab for Cutie, Mew, Paper Route, Sigur Rós, Thrice, Sunny Day Real Estate, Dave Grohl and Múm.

== Personal life ==
Farro currently resides in Nashville, Tennessee.

Farro is currently in a relationship with musician Kayla Graninger, also known as Elke. The two got engaged in February 2026.

== Discography ==
Studio albums

- Operator (2025)

Extended plays

- Zafari (2020)

With Paramore

- All We Know Is Falling (2005)
- Riot! (2007)
- Brand New Eyes (2009)
- After Laughter (2017)
- This Is Why (2023)

With HalfNoise

Studio albums

- Volcano Crowe (2014)
- Sudden Feeling (2016)
- Natural Disguise (2019)
- Motif (2021)
- City Talk (2023)

Extended plays

- HalfNoise (2012)
- The Velvet Face EP (2017)
- Flowerss (2018)

With Hayley Williams

- Petals for Armor (2020)

== Equipment ==
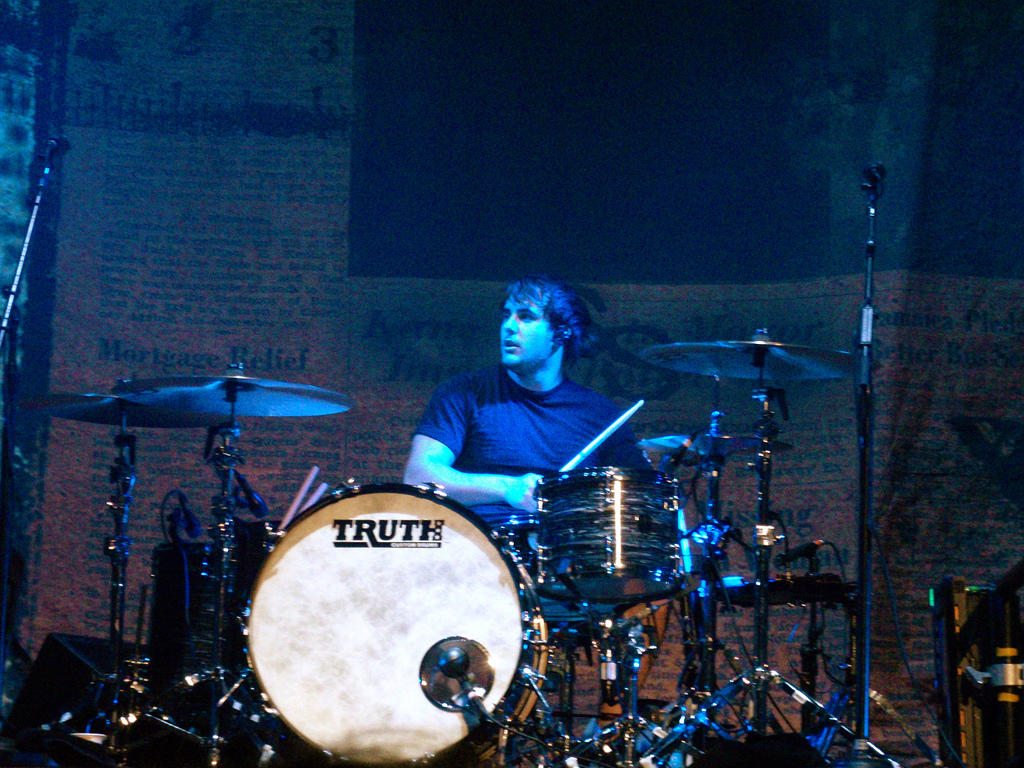
Farro playing with Truth drums in 2009

Farro went through a multitude of different drum and cymbal endorsements throughout his career, with Drum Workshop hardware and pedals, Promark sticks and Remo drum heads being consistent parts of his set. Farro used and was endorsed by custom drum company Truth Drums paired with Meinl cymbals, until his departure from the group in 2010. When Farro rejoined the group in 2017, he used and endorsed drums by Gretsch paired with Zildjian cymbals.

In October 2022, Farro was spotted using a yellow Vistalite kit from drum company Ludwig paired with Istanbul Agop cymbals. Endorsements for both companies were announced a month later.
