= Josh Farro =

American guitarist

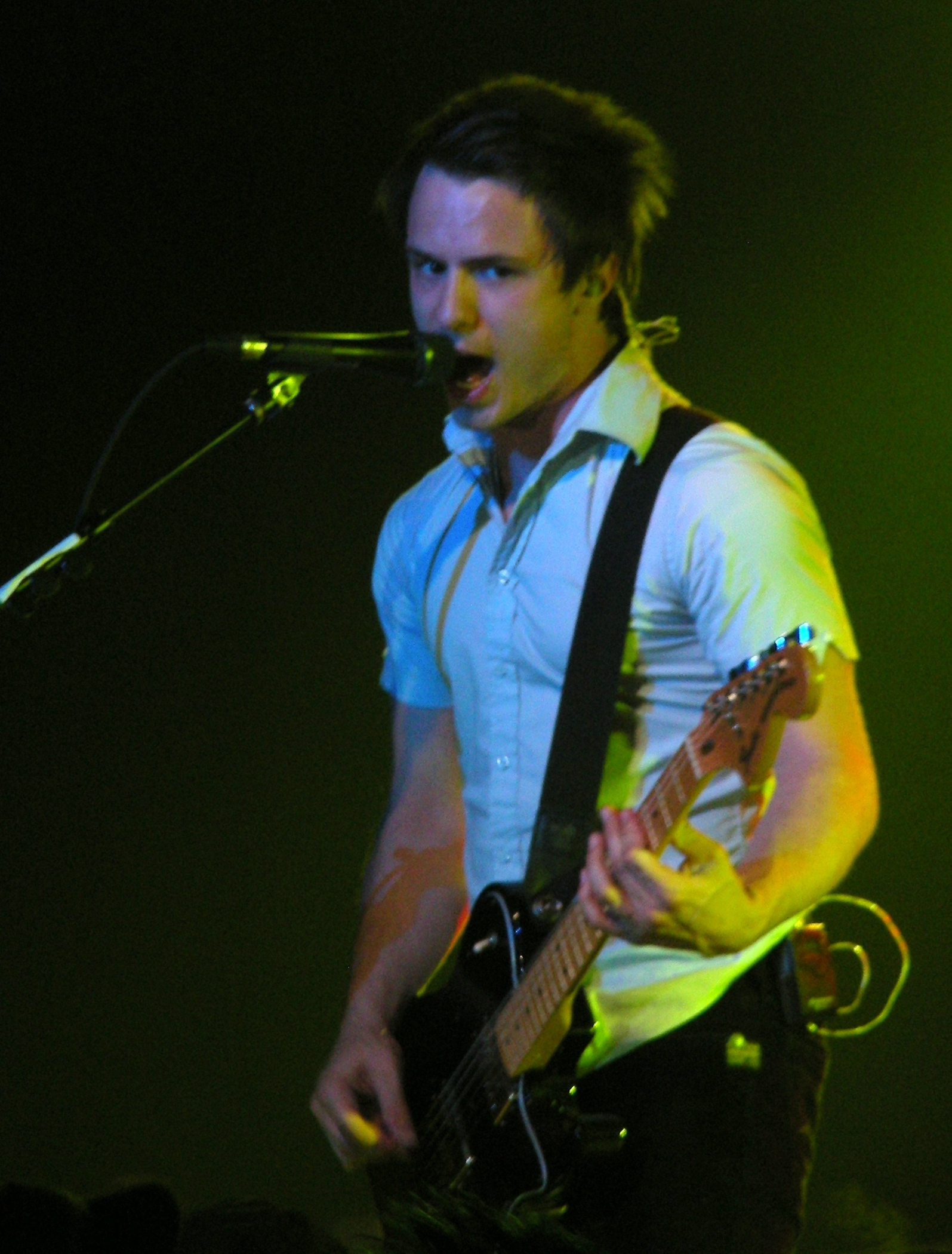
- Farro performing with Paramore in 2008

Background information
- Born: Joshua Neil Farro; September 29, 1987 (age 38); Voorhees Township, New Jersey, U.S.
- Genres: Alternative rock; pop-punk; pop rock; power pop; emo pop; emo
- Occupation: Musician
- Instruments: Guitar; vocals
- Years active: 2004–present
- Member of: Farro; Poets and Prophets; The War Within Me
- Formerly of: Paramore; Novel American
- Spouse: Jenna Rice (m. 2010)

Joshua Neil Farro (born September 29, 1987) is an American musician, best known as co-founder, former lead guitarist and backing vocalist for the rock band Paramore. Since leaving Paramore in 2010, he has pursued a solo career as the lead vocalist and guitarist of his self-named band Farro. His debut solo album, Walkways, was released in 2016.

== Early life ==
Farro was born in Voorhees Township, New Jersey, on September 29, 1987, the second-oldest of five siblings, including Paramore drummer Zac Farro. He is a self-taught guitarist and began playing when he was 13 years old. His family later moved to Franklin, Tennessee.

== Career ==
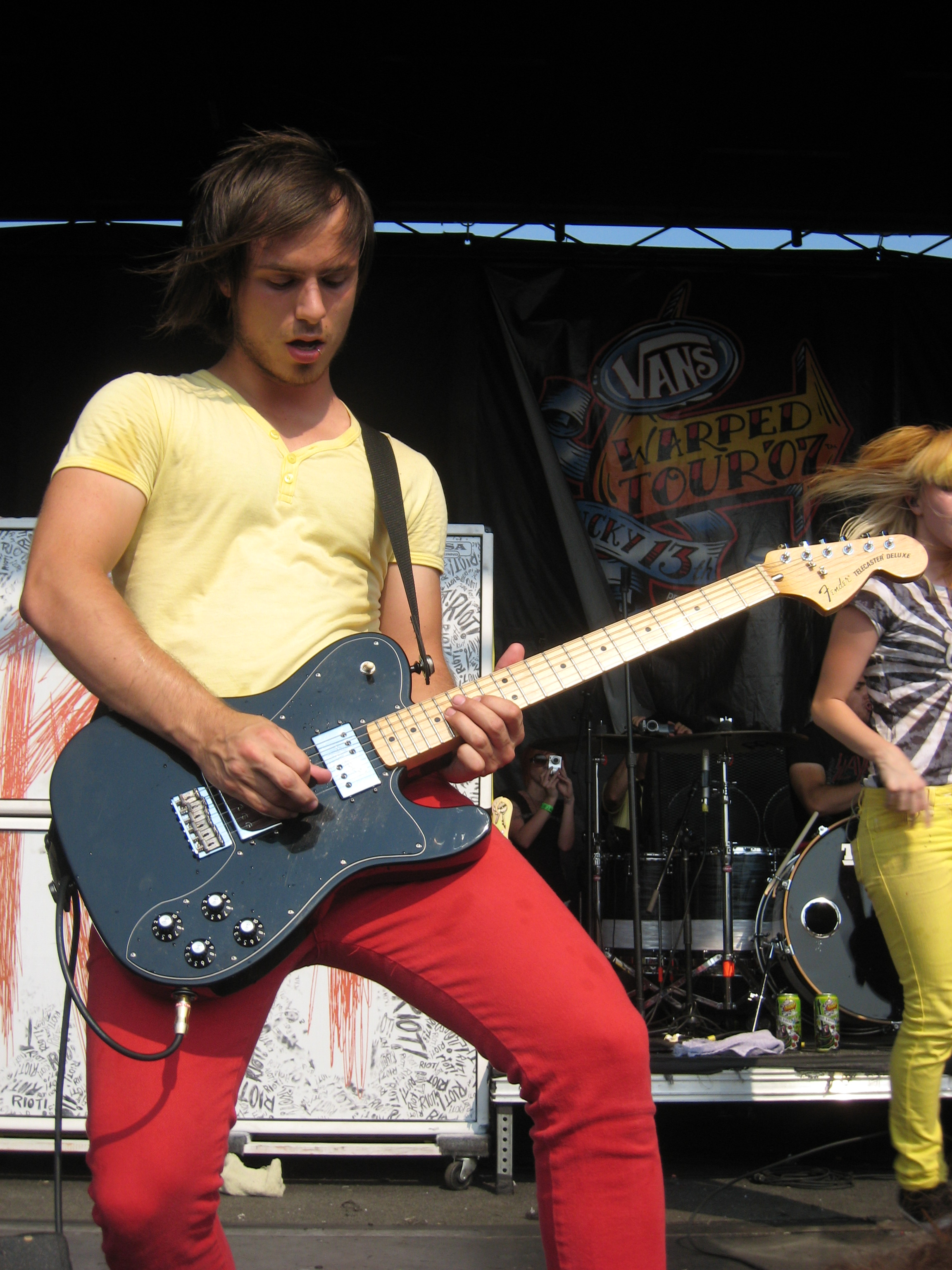
Farro with Paramore in 2007

=== Paramore (2004–2010) ===
Along with his younger brother Zac, Farro was a founding member of Paramore, serving as the band's lead guitarist and backing vocalist from 2004 until his exit in late 2010. Farro was credited with co-writing almost every track on Paramore's first three albums.

==== Departure and blog controversy ====
On December 21, 2010, a blog appeared online claiming to be an official exit statement from the Farro brothers. The blog entry refuted statements made by Paramore's official website regarding the brothers' departure and was heavily critical of Hayley Williams, her family, Atlantic Records, and Fueled by Ramen. Farro appeared in a video on YouTube claiming that the blog was genuine. The video was quickly removed for reported violations, but Farro re-uploaded it a few days later. Farro, a Christian, cited his and Williams' differing beliefs as a reason for departing Paramore.

=== Novel American (2011–2014) ===
On February 2, 2011, Farro announced he had established a Twitter account for his new band, Novel American. The band included high school friends Van Beasley, Tyler Ward, and Ryan Clark, each formerly of the band Cecil Adora. Unlike in Paramore, Farro relegated himself to guitar in the new project, saying, "I never wanted to sing. My voice — and this is not false humility — is just not that good."

On February 22, 2011, the band announced Farro's brother Zac would replace Tyler Ward on drums. However, on May 23, 2014, Farro stated that he had scrapped the project entirely, primarily due to the lack of a suitable vocalist.

=== Farro (2014–2017) ===
In May 2014, Farro announced on Twitter that he had scrapped his previous band, Novel American, because "nothing was going anywhere". Later that year, he announced the name of his solo project, Farro. His debut single, "Color Rush", was released in November 2014, with a music video appearing on YouTube. Farro released his debut album, Walkways, independently on February 5, 2016.

He announced a mini tour to support the album throughout the year. On May 19, 2017, he announced on Twitter that he is writing for his second album, however there has been no update on a release date since.

=== Poets & Prophets (2018–Present) ===
On February 6, 2026, it was announced that Farro, alongside Rebekah White Williams, Mitch Wong, and Tommy Iceland had joined to create Poets and Prophets, a contemporary Christian music collective. They were signed to Fair Trade Services, and their debut single, "Make Room", was released on March 13, 2026.

The War Within Me (2026-Present)

In March 2026 it was announced that Farro, alongside Logan Murphy and Zane Callister started a new band known as The War Within Me. Farro on lead vocals, Logan Murphy on Drums and Zane Callister on guitar. Their first single “Do You Ever” was released on April 17, 2026.

== Personal life ==
On April 3, 2010, Farro married fiancée Jenna Rice in Tennessee, missing Paramore's Pacific Rim tour to plan the wedding. Their daughter was born on January 28, 2018, and their son was born on May 22, 2020.

He has four siblings, including Zac. Farro currently resides in Nashville, Tennessee.

== Discography ==
=== Studio albums ===
- Walkways (2016)

=== With Paramore ===
- All We Know Is Falling (2005)
- Riot! (2007)
- Brand New Eyes (2009)

== Other songs ==
He was one of three co-writers of the song "This Is Amazing Grace" along with Jeremy Riddle and Phil Wickham; the song is featured on both Bethel Music's (Bethel Church) live CD/DVD For the Sake of the World where Jeremy performed it, as well as on Phil Wickham's album The Ascension.
