= Fever (Bullet for My Valentine album) =

Studio album by Bullet for My Valentine
- Released: 26 April 2010
- Recorded: April–December 2009
- Studios: The Document Room (Malibu, California); Monnow Valley Studio (Monmouth, Wales)
- Genres: Heavy metal; melodic metalcore
- Length: 49:33
- Labels: Sony Music; Jive
- Producer: Don Gilmore

Bullet for My Valentine chronology
Scream Aim Fire (2008)	Fever (2010)	Temper Temper (2013)

Singles from Fever
- 1. "Your Betrayal" Released: 2 March 2010; 2. "The Last Fight" Released: 17 April 2010; 3. "Bittersweet Memories" Released: 25 November 2010; 4. "Fever" Released: 21 March 2011

Fever is the third studio album by Welsh heavy metal band Bullet for My Valentine. Containing eleven tracks, the album was released on 26 and 27 April 2010 in the UK and in the US, respectively. The album sold 71,000 copies in the US and 21,965 in the UK in its first week of release to debut at position No. 3 on The Billboard 200 and No. 1 on Billboard's Rock and Alternative charts, making it the band's most successfully-charting record to date. Since its release, Fever has sold over 600,000 copies worldwide. It also went gold in both the United Kingdom in 2013 and New Zealand in 2025, respectively.

== Writing and recording ==
In early 2009, about a year after Bullet for My Valentine released their second studio album, Scream Aim Fire, the band started writing new material. In a March 2009 interview with Metal Hammer, Matthew Tuck stated that on previous albums he had written lyrics for the songs after the band had completed writing instrumental parts; but for Fever, Tuck had been writing both at the same time. Bullet for My Valentine originally entered the studio in April 2009 with producer Don Gilmore (best known for his work with Linkin Park and Good Charlotte) at Monmouth, Wales, and cancelled tour dates in South Africa to continue recording. The band took time off from recording in mid-2009 to perform on various tours including the 2009 Mayhem Festival. During the Mayhem Festival, Bullet for My Valentine included a new song to their live setlist. Following their tours, the band returned to studio to finish Fever. Recording was completed in December 2009, and Gilmore began tracking the album shortly thereafter in Malibu, California.

In a 12 March 2010 interview with UK's Metal Hammer magazine, Matthew Tuck stated about the writing and recording process for the new album:

"We wanted to do something fresh and exciting, but that was still us. Having Don Gilmore was a very conscious decision. We didn't want him to change us as musicians, just help with the vocals and get the best possible performances out of us. [...] It's a weird thing singing in the studio; you don't get the adrenaline, the energy, the buzz, it's you in front of a microphone looking at a guy staring at you. To get the performances out in the studio was hard, but Don was amazing. We rewrote the lyrics and melodies up to five times on some songs because he didn't think they were strong enough. We worked insanely hard to get the vocal lines different but still Bullet. The vocals took longer than everything else on the album put together. It was brutal work, but I personally thought I had a huge point to prove so that's why I stuck at it. [...] Everyone's buzzing about this one. We just tried to get that energy and excitement and vibe back into the band because the Scream Aim Fire [2008] sessions just ripped our hearts out of wanting to be in a band."

Guitar Edge had an interview with some members of the band where Matthew Tuck talked about Fever:

"[...] The main objective on this album was to please ourselves rather than pleasing other people and critics. We wanted to go into making this album as innocent as you do making your first record, with no expectations and no pressure. Just do what you do. That formula made our first album [The Poison] explode. So even though Scream Aim Fire was successful, we did stray away from that formula that made us who we were in the first place so we wanted to go back and recapture the moment. [...] There was a lot of experimentation in trying new techniques I'd never tried before, but ended up resulting in a better product. I always thought that I knew what was best, but I think I was internally trying to understand that I don't always know what's best and think of the better product. [...] The recording process was tough, but challenging and rewarding. The end result really speaks for itself and I adore it."

== Musical style ==
Having moved to more of a thrash metal sound on Scream Aim Fire, Fever largely abandoned the style in favour of a more mainstream heavy metal sound. However, the song "Bittersweet Memories" and its lyrics have been described as "more emo than metal".

== Release and promotion ==
On 14 February 2010, the band offered a new track, "Begging for Mercy", for free download from their official website for a limited time.

The first and lead single for the US, "Your Betrayal", was set for release on 8 March 2010 to the radio; and, unexpectedly, was released early as a Digital 45 on iTunes along with the track "Begging for Mercy" on 2 March 2010.

The second and lead single for the UK, "The Last Fight", was released on 19 April 2010 to the radio and a limited edition 7" single on 17 April 2010 with "Begging for Mercy" as a B-side.

On 24 February 2010, Bullet for My Valentine were on a trip to Los Angeles to shoot a pair of videos: One clip is for the US lead single "Your Betrayal" (released on 12 April 2010), while the other is for the UK lead single "The Last Fight" (released on 12 March 2010). Director Paul R. Brown (best known for his work with Slipknot and Korn) handled both shoots.

In September 2010 on Australian radio, Tuck announced that videos would be in production for the title track and "Bittersweet Memories" The music video for "Bittersweet Memories" was released on 25 November 2010. In a phone interview with drummer, Thomas during February 2011, he stated that the original music videos for "Bittersweet Memories" and Fever were scrapped and that Matt Tuck and Himself wrote the screenplay for what is now "Bittersweet Memories" and that the "Fever" video will not be released because the band felt that it was not suitable enough in quality for the song.

== Reception ==
Professional ratings
Aggregate scores
Source	Rating
Metacritic	63/100
Review scores
Source	Rating
411mania	7.5/10 stars
Allmusic	3.5/5 stars
Kerrang!	5/5 stars
Q Magazine	3/5 stars
Rock Sound	8/10 stars
Sputnikmusic	3/5 stars
Ultimate Guitar	(7.3/10)

Upon its release, Fever received generally positive reviews from critics. The album holds a score of 63/100 on the review aggregator Metacritic based on 12 reviews. Allmusic states that on this third disc, the band "consolidate their style and split the difference between their two previous discs" and describes the album as "a solid disc by a group that knows its own strengths".

Fever received positive reviews from Rock Sound ("[...] There's not a single track here that would create an unpleasant contrast") and Kerrang! which gave it a 5/5 K-rating. "It's true that Fever combines the tunefulness of first album The Poison with the velocity of Scream Aim Fire, but it also goes much further than that. Its inspired songwriting, impeccable musicianship and unbridled confidence propel Bullet to a level that they could only point towards previously. As their new day dawns, so their finest hour begins," enthused reviewer Steve Beebee.

Conversely, The New Review gave the album 2.5 out of 5; disappointed of the band's new record, Ben Westerman commented: "[...] As a fan, I'll wait to hear what direction the band takes next, while letting this Fever pass and move on". PopMatters classified it as a decent album, as it "[...] maintains the level of quality that Scream Aim Fire had, but doesn't advance back to their prior level of excellence. [...] There are more good songs than bad [The Last Fight, Pleasure and Pain and Dignity], but the bad songs are very seriously flawed, and will likely stand out more than the positive aspects of the good songs".

Guitar Edge, on their June 2010 magazine, described Fever as one of Bullet for My Valentine's hardest hitting albums to date. "[...] It combines the infectious melodies and brute force that listeners expect, but with a new, albeit classic, feel. The album is a sonic masterpiece that showcases the band's phenomenal range of talent". Noisecreep did a brief review talking about Fever's favourable side:

"The Welsh blokes have skyrocketed in recent years, thanks to adept riff displays that fall somewhere along the spectrum between Avenged Sevenfold and Trivium. BFMV and Fever are all about the shred. The choppy first single Your Betrayal rages with the heat of a thousand suns and the album boasts a crisp, clean production where every note is experienced. The Last Fight and the title track marry melody with metallic bluster in a way that never waters down either element."

One of the tracks to receive standout praise, despite not being released as a single, was "Alone". BBC describes it as "[...] the brightest standout, which rocks to a rampaging riff that courses all the way to its core – it's sure to give any listener shivers, such is its magnitude". Billboard fully enjoyed it, saying that "[...] [Alone] offers six minutes of epic ebb-and-flow orchestration"; and among many other critics strongly recommends to listen. Even critics like AbsolutePunk, who really disliked the album, recognised "Alone" as "the standout track" which its "[..] chorus is sing-along-able and the guitar solo is harmonized and completely brutal!" Other impressive songs are the two first singles, the "strong opening of the album", "Your Betrayal" ("[...] The military drumming of Your Betrayal opens the album with infantry intensity and then some wonderfully crisp riffing gives way to Matt Tuck whispering about insanity") and "The Last Fight", they both "[...] demonstrate as much from the outset, presenting fast-paced passages before parrying the momentum into upswings of melody"; and, along with the title-track "Fever", create "a brilliant opening trio". One song, "Bittersweet Memories" did not seem to be as welcomed as all the other tracks, as critics such as BBC classified it as a song "[...] with lyrics of childish despair and forlorn desire, the weakest track here". Or PopMatters, who also disliked the song, credited it as "[...] absolutely terrible, having more in common with My Chemical Romance than any other band". The song, however, made one of Allmusic's track picks.

== Track listing ==
All lyrics are written by Matthew Tuck; all music is composed by Bullet for My Valentine

Standard edition
No.	Title	Length
1.	"Your Betrayal"	4:51
2.	"Fever"	3:57
3.	"The Last Fight"	4:19
4.	"A Place Where You Belong"	5:06
5.	"Pleasure and Pain"	3:53
6.	"Alone"	5:56
7.	"Breaking Out, Breaking Down"	4:04
8.	"Bittersweet Memories"	5:09
9.	"Dignity"	4:29
10.	"Begging for Mercy"	3:56
11.	"Pretty on the Outside"	3:56
Total length:		49:33

iTunes pre-order bonus track
No.	Title	Length
12.	"The Last Fight" (acoustic version)	4:38
Total length:		54:11

UK tour edition bonus tracks
No.	Title	Length
12.	"Fever" (Live at XFM)	3:57
13.	"The Last Fight" (Live at XFM)	4:18
14.	"Bittersweet Memories" (Live at XFM)	5:07
Total length:		67:33

Japanese version bonus tracks
No.	Title	Length
12.	"The Last Fight" (acoustic version)	4:38
13.	"Road to Nowhere" (from Scream Aim Fire (Deluxe Edition))	4:19
14.	"Watching Us Die Tonight" (from Scream Aim Fire (Deluxe Edition))	3:53
15.	"One Good Reason Why" (from Scream Aim Fire (Deluxe Edition))	4:02
Total length:		66:22

Japanese version DVD
No.	Title	Length
1.	"The Last Fight" (Music video)
2.	"The Last Fight" (Behind the scenes)
3.	"Questions & Answers"
4.	"Bullet TV"

Australian tour edition bonus CD
No.	Title	Length
1.	"4 Words (To Choke Upon)" (Taken from the Hand of Blood EP)	3:44
2.	"Hand of Blood" (Taken from the Hand of Blood EP)	3:36
3.	"Cries in Vain" (Taken from the Hand of Blood EP)	3:59
4.	"Curses" (Taken from the Hand of Blood EP)	3:59
5.	"No Control" (Taken from the Hand of Blood EP)	3:34
6.	"Just Another Star" (Taken from the Hand of Blood EP)	2:54
7.	"Tears Don't Fall" (acoustic) (Taken from The Poison (Deluxe Edition))	4:38
8.	"The Last Fight (Acoustic)" (iTunes pre-order bonus track from Fever)	4:39
9.	"Hearts Burst into Fire (Acoustic)" (Taken from the "Hearts Burst into Fire" single)	3:57
10.	"Forever and Always (Acoustic)" (Taken from the "Scream Aim Fire" single)	4:18
11.	"Say Goodnight (Acoustic)" (Taken from the Waking the Demon single)	3:14
Total length:		42:32

UK tour edition DVD
No.	Title	Length
1.	"Your Betrayal" (Live at Graspop Metal Meeting 2010)
2.	"Fever" (Live at Graspop Metal Meeting 2010)
3.	"Waking the Demon" (Live at Graspop Metal Meeting 2010)
4.	"The Last Fight" (Music video)
5.	"Your Betrayal" (Music video)
6.	"Fever" (Track by track commentary)

== Personnel ==
Bullet for My Valentine

- Matt Tuck – lead vocals, guitar, piano on "The Last Fight" (Acoustic Version); bass (uncredited)
- Michael "Moose" Thomas – drums
- Michael "Padge" Paget – guitar, backing vocals
- Jay James – bass (credited but doesn't perform), backing vocals

Production

- Don Gilmore – producer
- Mark Kiczula – engineering
- Ginge Martin – engineering
- Jeff Rose – engineering
- Tom Manning – assistant recording engineering
- Simon Jones – assistant recording engineering
- Darren Jones – assistant recording engineering
- Kevin Bosley – assistant recording engineering
- Chris Lord-Alge – mixer
- Keith Armstrong – assistant engineering
- Nik Karpen – assistant engineering
- Brad Townsend – additional engineering
- Andrew Schubert – additional engineering
- Ted Jensen – mastering
- Martin Dodd – A&R
- Michael Tedesco – A&R
- P. R. Brown – photography, design, music video direction ("Your Betrayal" and "The Last Fight")

== Charts ==
=== Weekly charts ===
Chart (2010)	Peak position
Australian Albums (ARIA)	5
Austrian Albums (Ö3 Austria)	2
Belgian Albums (Ultratop Flanders)	48
Belgian Albums (Ultratop Wallonia)	65
Canadian Albums (Billboard)	4
Dutch Albums (Album Top 100)	84
European Albums (Billboard)	2
Finnish Albums (Suomen virallinen lista)	3
French Albums (SNEP)	25
German Albums (Offizielle Top 100)	3
Greek Albums (IFPI)	2
Irish Albums (IRMA)	23
Italian Albums (FIMI)	50
Japanese Albums (Oricon)	1
New Zealand Albums (RMNZ)	9
Norwegian Albums (VG-lista)	19
Scottish Albums (Official Charts)	7
Spanish Albums (PROMUSICAE)	80
Swedish Albums (Sverigetopplistan)	14
Swedish Hard Rock Albums (Sverigetopplistan)	1
Swiss Albums (Schweizer Hitparade)	4
UK Albums (Official Charts)	5
UK Album Downloads (Official Charts)	4
UK Rock & Metal Albums (Official Charts)	1
US Billboard 200	3
US Top Alternative Albums (Billboard)	1
US Independent Albums (Billboard)	1
US Top Rock Albums (Billboard)	1
US Top Hard Rock Albums (Billboard)	1

=== Year-end charts ===
Chart (2010)	Position
UK Albums (OCC)	182
US Billboard 200	168
US Top Rock Albums (Billboard)	42

== Certifications ==
Region	Certification	Certified units/sales
New Zealand (RMNZ)	Gold	7,500^{‡}
United Kingdom (BPI)	Gold	100,000^{^}
^{^} Shipments figures based on certification alone.^{‡} Sales+streaming figures based on certification alone.

== Release history ==
Country	Date	Label
Japan	21 April 2010	Jive
Germany	23 April 2010	Jive
United Kingdom	26 April 2010	Jive
United States	27 April 2010	Jive
Europe	28 April 2010	Jive
