= Kerrang! Awards 2008 =

British music awards ceremony

- Sponsored by: Kerrang!
- Date: 21 August 2008
- Location: The Brewery, London
- Country: England
- Hosted by: Scott Ian

The Kerrang! Awards 2008 were held in London, England, on 21 August 2008 at The Brewery in Romford and were hosted by Anthrax guitarist Scott Ian.

On 22 July 2008 Kerrang! announced the 2008 nominees. The main categories were dominated by Thirty Seconds to Mars and Bullet for My Valentine with four nominations, followed by Avenged Sevenfold with three. Thirty Seconds to Mars was the biggest winner of the night, taking home two awards.

== Nominations ==
Winners are in bold text.

=== Best British Newcomer ===
- Dead Swans
- We Are the Ocean
- **Slaves to Gravity**
- Elliot Minor
- Go:Audio

=== Best International Newcomer ===
- Kill Hannah
- A Day to Remember
- Four Year Strong
- **Black Tide**
- All Time Low

=== Best British Band ===
- Lostprophets
- Bring Me the Horizon
- You Me at Six
- **Bullet for My Valentine**
- Biffy Clyro

=== Best International Band ===
- **Thirty Seconds to Mars**
- My Chemical Romance
- Madina Lake
- Coheed and Cambria
- Avenged Sevenfold

=== Best Live Band ===
- Thirty Seconds to Mars
- Lostprophets
- **Machine Head**
- The Dillinger Escape Plan
- Avenged Sevenfold

=== Best Album ===
- Bullet for My Valentine — Scream Aim Fire
- **Avenged Sevenfold — Avenged Sevenfold**
- In Flames — A Sense of Purpose
- Mindless Self Indulgence — If
- Cancer Bats — Hail Destroyer

=== Best Single ===
- **Thirty Seconds to Mars — "From Yesterday"**
- Bullet for My Valentine — "Waking the Demon"
- Simple Plan — "Your Love Is a Lie"
- Kids in Glass Houses — "Give Me What I Want"
- Pendulum — "Propane Nightmares"

=== Best Video ===
- Thirty Seconds to Mars — "A Beautiful Lie"
- Bullet for My Valentine — "Waking the Demon"
- Weezer — "Pork and Beans"
- **Coheed and Cambria — "Feathers"**
- Gallows — "Staring at the Rude Bois"

=== Classic Songwriter ===
- **Def Leppard**

=== Kerrang! Inspiration ===
- **Metallica**

=== Kerrang! Icon ===
- **Slipknot**

=== Kerrang! Hall of Fame ===
- **Rage Against the Machine**

=== Spirit of Independence ===
- **The Dillinger Escape Plan**
