= List of awards and nominations received by My Chemical Romance =

My Chemical Romance awards and nominations
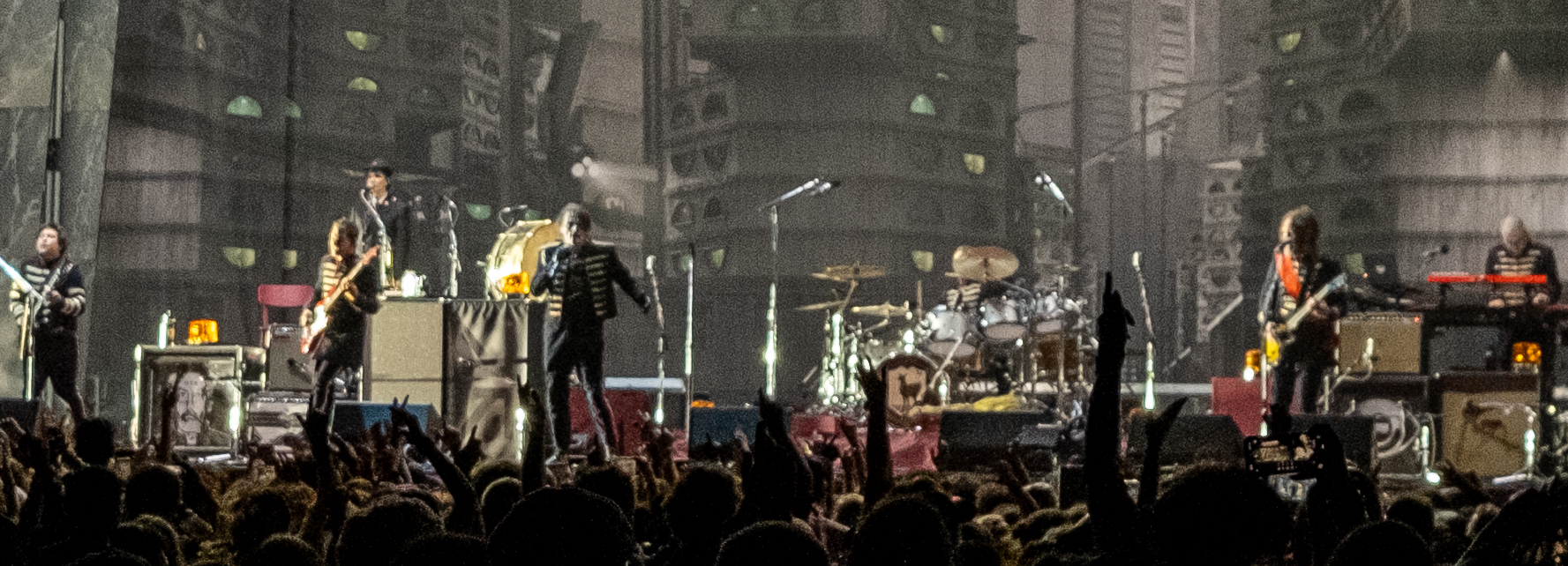
- My Chemical Romance performing in 2025
Awards and nominations
Award	Wins	Nominations
American Music Awards	0	1
Do Something Awards	0	1
Grammy Awards	0	1
Kerrang! Awards	6	12
Metal Hammer Golden Gods Awards	0	3
MTV Latin America Awards	1	2
MTV Asia Awards	3	3
MTV Australia Awards	0	2
MTV Europe Music Awards	0	5
MTV Video Music Awards	0	6
MTV Video Music Awards Japan	1	2
MuchMusic Video Awards	2	3
Music Video Production Association Awards	4	6
NME Awards	3	20
Scream Awards	0	1
Teen Choice Awards	0	1
TRL Awards	2	2
UK Festival Awards	0	1

Totals (Note: Certain award groups do not simply award one winner. They acknowledge several different recipients, have runners-up, and have third place. Since this is a specific recognition and is different from losing an award, runner-up mentions are considered wins in this award tally. For simplification and to avoid errors, each award in this list has been presumed to have had a prior nomination.)
- Wins: 25
- Nominations: 74

My Chemical Romance are an American rock band formed in New Jersey in 2001. Their current lineup consists of vocalist Gerard Way, lead guitarist Ray Toro, bassist Mikey Way, and rhythm guitarist Frank Iero. They have received several accolades, including six Kerrang! Awards and three NME Awards. Overall, My Chemical Romance have won 2 awards from 74 nominations.

The band released their debut studio album, I Brought You My Bullets, You Brought Me Your Love, in July 2002 to limited success. Their second studio album, Three Cheers for Sweet Revenge (2004), pushed the band into the mainstream, and won the category for Best Album at the 2005 Kerrang! Awards. Its success was supported by three singles, "I'm Not Okay (I Promise)", "Helena", and "The Ghost of You". "I'm Not Okay (I Promise)" and "Helena" were both nominated for Best Single and Best Video at the 2005 Kerrang! Awards, with the latter winning the category. "The Ghost of You" won the Best Styling award at the Music Video Production Association Awards, and was nominated for Best Video at the Metal Hammer Golden Gods Awards in 2006.

My Chemical Romance's third studio album, The Black Parade, was released in October 2006, and contained the singles "Welcome to the Black Parade" and "Teenagers". The Black Parade was nominated for the Grammy Award for Best Boxed or Special Limited Edition Package category in 2008, and "Welcome to the Black Parade" won the award for Best Rock Video at the 2007 Japan MTV Video Music Awards, while "Teenagers" was also nominated for Best Video at the NME Awards in 2008. The band received multiple Best Rock Band nominations, including one at the 2006 Kerrang! Awards, and ended up winning the People's Choice category for Favorite International Group at the 2007 MuchMusic Video Awards.

My Chemical Romance released their fourth studio album, Danger Days: The True Lives of the Fabulous Killjoys, in November 2010. The lead single, "Na Na Na (Na Na Na Na Na Na Na Na Na)", won the awards for Best Video at the 2011 Kerrang! Awards and the 2011 NME Awards. The album's second and third singles, "Sing" and "Planetary (Go!)", were nominated at the 2011 Teen Choice Awards and the award for Best Single at the 2011 Kerrang! Awards respectively, although both of them did not receive the awards.

== Awards and nominations ==
Awards and nominations received by My Chemical Romance
Association	Year (Note: Indicates the year of ceremony. Each year is linked to the article about the awards held that year, wherever possible.)	Recipient(s) and nominee(s)	Category	Result	Ref.
American Music Awards	2007	My Chemical Romance	Favorite Alternative Artist	Nominated	
Do Something Awards	2011	"#SINGItForJapan"	Charity Song	Nominated	
Grammy Awards	2008	The Black Parade	Best Boxed or Special Limited Edition Package	Nominated	
Kerrang! Awards	2004	My Chemical Romance	Best International Newcomer	Nominated	
Kerrang! Awards	2005	My Chemical Romance	Best Band On The Planet	Nominated	
Kerrang! Awards	2005	Three Cheers for Sweet Revenge	Best Album	Won	
Kerrang! Awards	2005	"I'm Not Okay (I Promise)"	Best Single	Nominated	
Kerrang! Awards	2005	"Helena"	Best Video	Won	
Kerrang! Awards	2006	My Chemical Romance	Best Band on the Planet	Won	
Kerrang! Awards	2007	My Chemical Romance	Best International Band	Won	
Kerrang! Awards	2007	The Black Parade	Best Album	Nominated	
Kerrang! Awards	2007	"Welcome to the Black Parade"	Best Single	Nominated	
Kerrang! Awards	2007	"Welcome to the Black Parade"	Best Video	Nominated	
Kerrang! Awards	2008	My Chemical Romance	Best International Band	Nominated	
Kerrang! Awards	2011	My Chemical Romance	Best International Band	Nominated	
Kerrang! Awards	2011	My Chemical Romance	Best Live Band	Nominated	
Kerrang! Awards	2011	Danger Days: The True Lives of the Fabulous Killjoys	Best Album	Nominated	
Kerrang! Awards	2011	"Na Na Na (Na Na Na Na Na Na Na Na Na)"	Best Video	Won	
Kerrang! Awards	2011	"Planetary (Go!)"	Best Single	Nominated	
Kerrang! Awards	2012	My Chemical Romance	Best International Band	Won	
Kerrang! Awards	2012	My Chemical Romance	Best Live Band	Nominated	
Metal Hammer Golden Gods Awards	2006	"The Ghost of You"	Best Video	Nominated	
Metal Hammer Golden Gods Awards	2007	The Black Parade	Album of the Year	Nominated	
Metal Hammer Golden Gods Awards	2007	"Welcome to the Black Parade"	Best Video	Nominated	
MTV Latin America Awards	2005	My Chemical Romance	Best New Artist - International	Nominated	
MTV Latin America Awards	2006	My Chemical Romance	Best Rock Artist - International	Won	
MTV Asia Awards	2006	My Chemical Romance	Favorite Rock Act	Won	
MTV Asia Awards	2006	My Chemical Romance	Favorite Breakthrough Artist	Won	
MTV Asia Awards	2006	"Helena"	Favorite Video	Won	
MTV Australia Awards	2007	"Welcome to the Black Parade"	Best Rock Video	Nominated	
MTV Australia Awards	2007	"Welcome to the Black Parade"	Video of the Year	Nominated	
MTV Europe Music Awards	2007	My Chemical Romance	Best Band	Nominated	
MTV Europe Music Awards	2007	My Chemical Romance	Best Inter Act	Nominated	
MTV Europe Music Awards	2007	My Chemical Romance	Rock Out	Nominated	
MTV Europe Music Awards	2011	My Chemical Romance	Best Alternative Band	Nominated	
MTV Europe Music Awards	2011	My Chemical Romance	Best World Stage Performance	Nominated	
MTV Video Music Awards	2005	"Helena"	MTV2 Award	Nominated	
MTV Video Music Awards	2005	"Helena"	Best Rock Video	Nominated	
MTV Video Music Awards	2005	"Helena"	Best New Artist in a Video	Nominated	
MTV Video Music Awards	2005	"Helena"	Best Choreography in a Video	Nominated	
MTV Video Music Awards	2005	"Helena"	Viewer's Choice	Nominated	
MTV Video Music Awards	2025	My Chemical Romance	Best Group	Nominated	
MTV Video Music Awards Japan	2007	"Welcome to the Black Parade"	Best Rock Video	Won	
MTV Video Music Awards Japan	2007	"Welcome to the Black Parade"	Best Group Video	Nominated	
MuchMusic Video Awards	2005	"Helena"	Best International Group Video	Nominated	
MuchMusic Video Awards	2007	My Chemical Romance	People's Choice: Favorite International Group	Won	
MuchMusic Video Awards	2007	"Welcome to the Black Parade"	Best International Group Video	Won	
Music Video Production Association Awards	2005	"I'm Not Okay (I Promise)"	Best Alternative	Won	
Music Video Production Association Awards	2005	"I'm Not Okay (I Promise)"	Best Direction of a New Artist	Nominated	
Music Video Production Association Awards	2006	"Helena"	Best Colorist/Telecine	Nominated	
Music Video Production Association Awards	2006	"The Ghost of You"	Best Styling	Won	
Music Video Production Association Awards	2007	"Welcome to the Black Parade"	Best Colorist/Telecine	Won	
Music Video Production Association Awards	2007	"Welcome to the Black Parade"	Best Styling	Won	
Myx Music Awards	2007	"Welcome to the Black Parade"	Favorite International Video	Won	
Myx Music Awards	2008	"Teenagers"	Favorite International Video	Won	
NME Awards	2007	My Chemical Romance	Best International Band	Won	
NME Awards	2007	My Chemical Romance	Best Live Band	Nominated	
NME Awards	2007	The Black Parade	Best Album	Nominated	
NME Awards	2007	Life on the Murder Scene	Best Music DVD	Nominated	
NME Awards	2007	The Black Parade	Worst Album	Nominated	
NME Awards	2008	My Chemical Romance	Best International Band	Nominated	
NME Awards	2008	My Chemical Romance	Best Live Band	Nominated	
NME Awards	2008	"Teenagers"	Best Video	Nominated	
NME Awards	2008	My Chemical Romance	Worst Band	Nominated	
NME Awards	2011	My Chemical Romance	Best International Band	Won	
NME Awards	2011	Danger Days: The True Lives of the Fabulous Killjoys	Best Album	Nominated	
NME Awards	2011	Danger Days: The True Lives of the Fabulous Killjoys	Best Album Artwork	Nominated	
NME Awards	2011	"Na Na Na (Na Na Na Na Na Na Na Na Na)"	Best Video	Won	
NME Awards	2011	Danger Days: The True Lives of the Fabulous Killjoys	Worst Album	Nominated	
NME Awards	2012	My Chemical Romance and Brian May	Greatest Music Moment of the Year	Nominated	
NME Awards	2012	My Chemical Romance	Most Dedicated Fans	Nominated	
Scream Awards	2009	"Desolation Row"	Scream Song of the Year	Nominated	
Teen Choice Awards	2011	"Sing"	Choice Music: Rock Track	Nominated	
TRL Awards	2006	My Chemical Romance	Best Group that Actually Plays Instruments	Won	
TRL Awards	2006	My Chemical Romance	Best New Artist	Won	
UK Festival Awards	2011	My Chemical Romance	Best Headline Performance	Nominated	
