= Bittersweet Memories =

Song by Bullet for My Valentine

Single by Bullet for My Valentine

from the album Fever
- B-side: "The Last Fight" (live at XFM)
- Released: 14 December 2010
- Genre: Emo
- Length: 5:09
- Label: Jive
- Songwriters: Don Gilmore; Jason James; Michael Paget; Michael Thomas; Matthew Tuck
- Producer: Don Gilmore

Bullet for My Valentine singles chronology
"The Last Fight" (2010)	"Bittersweet Memories" (2010)	"Fever" (2011)

"Bittersweet Memories" is a power ballad by the Welsh heavy metal band Bullet for My Valentine. It is the third single from the band's third studio album, Fever. The music video for "Bittersweet Memories" was released on 25 November 2010.

== Background ==
The band told Noisecreep:

" 'Bittersweet Memories' is a classic Bullet for My Valentine fucked up love song about a relationship breakup. [...] You know when you go through all the painful memories, but at the same time you're fucking happy that you are now single, and you feel better off as you can now move on in your life? I guess it was chosen as the single as it's the closest thing we've got to a big ballad on our album, and it sounds great on the radio!"

== Music video ==
The music video for "Bittersweet Memories" starts with Matt Tuck in a room with no shirt on, singing the song. He then walks through a ruined shopping mall and it flicks to Jason James boarding up the windows and looking scared. Matt still wanders the mall. The music video shows Michael Paget playing his guitar. In the music video, Michael "Moose" Thomas smashes things with a baseball bat. Then, Matt is out of the mall, on the roof and he decides to run to the edge. However, he doesn't jump and the song ends.

== Track listing ==
No.	Title	Length
1.	"Bittersweet Memories" (Radio Edit)	3:52
2.	"The Last Fight" (Live at XFM)	4:18
Total length:		8:11

== Personnel ==
- Matthew "Matt" Tuck - lead vocals, rhythm and lead guitar
- Michael "Padge" Paget - lead guitar, backing vocals
- Jason "Jay" James - bass guitar, backing vocals
- Michael "Moose" Thomas - drums

== Charts ==
Chart (2010–2011)	Peak position
UK Rock & Metal (Official Charts)	7
US Mainstream Rock (Billboard)	21
US Hot Rock & Alternative Songs (Billboard)	50
US Rock & Alternative Airplay (Billboard)	50

== Critical reception ==
"Bittersweet Memories" did not seem to be as welcomed as the other tracks off Fever; critics like BBC classified it as a song "[...] with lyrics of childish despair and forlorn desire, the weakest track here". Or PopMatters, who also disliked the song, thinks it "[...] is absolutely terrible, having more in common with My Chemical Romance than any other band". The song, however, was one of AllMusic's track picks.
