= Fever (Bullet for My Valentine song) =

Single by Bullet for My Valentine

from the album Fever
- B-side: "Your Betrayal" (live at XFM)
- Released: 21 March 2011
- Genre: Metalcore
- Length: 3:57; 3:37 (radio edit)
- Label: Jive
- Songwriters: Don Gilmore; Jason James; Michael Paget; Michael Thomas; Matthew Tuck
- Producer: Don Gilmore

Bullet for My Valentine singles chronology
"Bittersweet Memories" (2010)	"Fever" (2011)	"Temper Temper" (2012)

"Fever" is the fourth and final single from the Welsh heavy metal band Bullet for My Valentine's third album of the same name. It is the only single from the album that does not have a music video. It peaked at number 23 on iLike Library's Most Added chart.

== Critical reception ==
The title track was met with favorable reviews. After describing Your Betrayal as having 'infantry intensity and then some wonderfully crisp riffing', BBC Raziq Rauf then claimed that "This approach is maintained throughout the rolling, pogo-friendly title-track".

== Track listing ==
No.	Title	Length
1.	"Fever" (Radio Edit)	3:37
2.	"Your Betrayal" (Live at XFM)	4:51
Total length:		8:29

== Personnel ==
- Matthew "Matt" Tuck – lead vocals, rhythm guitar
- Michael "Padge" Paget – lead guitar, backing vocals
- Jason "Jay" James – bass guitar, backing vocals
- Michael "Moose" Thomas – drums

== Charts ==
Chart (2010)	Peak position
US Mainstream Rock (Billboard)	28
