= Scatter the Crow =

Studio album by Slaves to Gravity
- Released: March 31, 2008
- Recorded: 2007
- Genre: Hard rock, alternative rock
- Length: 41:56
- Label: Gravitas Records

Slaves to Gravity chronology
''Scatter the Crow'' (2008)	UNDERWATEROUTERSPACE (2011)

Scatter the Crow is the debut album from Slaves to Gravity (Tommy Gleeson, Toshi Ogawa, Mark Verney, Jason Bowld, Jason Thomopoulos, Gemma Seddon). The album was released on March 31, 2008. The album has garnered 4 singles each of which also having videos: "Big Red", "Meantime", "Mr. Regulator" and "Doll Size".

== Track listing ==
1. "Heaven is a Lie" - 4:30
2. "She Says" - 3:46
3. "Big Red" - 3:45
4. "Meantime" - 3:22
5. "Too Late" - 3:30
6. "Doll Size" - 4:01
7. "LG Halo" - 5:02
8. "My Poor Hand" - 5:34
9. "Gutterfly" - 5:26
10. "Mr. Regulator" - 3:37
11. "Burning Robe" - 2:30
12. "Pluto" - 4:11
13. "Rosa & The Ocean Blue" - 3:45
