= The Last Fight (Bullet for My Valentine song) =

Single by Bullet for My Valentine

from the album Fever
- B-side: "Begging for Mercy"
- Released: 17 April 2010
- Recorded: The Document Room (Malibu, California); Monnow Valley Studio (Monmouth, Wales)
- Genre: Metalcore
- Length: 4:18
- Label: Jive
- Songwriters: Don Gilmore; Jason James; Michael Paget; Michael Thomas; Matthew Tuck
- Producer: Don Gilmore

Bullet for My Valentine singles chronology
"Your Betrayal" (2010)	"The Last Fight" (2010)	"Bittersweet Memories" (2010)

"The Last Fight" is a song by Welsh heavy metal band Bullet for My Valentine, released as the second and lead UK single from their third album, Fever, on 19 April 2010 to the radio and a limited 7" edition of 1000 copies on 17 April 2010 with "Begging for Mercy" as a B-side. An acoustic version of the song was released as a "pre-order only" bonus track on the iTunes version of the album. Before all that, "Begging for Mercy" was offered for free download on 14 February 2010 from the band's official website for a limited time.

== Reception ==
"The Last Fight" is one of the most successful songs of Fever, according to most of the critics. Rock Sound establishes that "[...] it demonstrate as much from the outset, presenting fast-paced passages before parrying the momentum into upswings of melody". Along with "Pleasure and Pain" and "Dignity", PopMatters states that these are "[...] high-energy, dynamic songs with powerful vocals and creative solos"; and, along with "Your Betrayal" and the title track, "Fever", create a "brilliant opening trio", according to BBC.

== Charts ==
Chart (2010)	Peak position
Scottish Singles Sales (Official Charts)	81
UK Singles (OCC)	92
UK Rock & Metal (OCC)	2

== Music video ==
The music video was released for the UK on 12 March 2010 on the band's MySpace website and on 18 March 2010 worldwide. It consists of a fight between two men in a poorly lit room while the band are playing the song, apparently in the same place. After a long fight, the masked fighter's mask is removed, and it is shown that the man was fighting himself.

== Track listing ==
Digital UK single - Promo single

1. "The Last Fight" – 4:18

7" limited edition single - Digital single (other countries)

1. "The Last Fight" - 4:18
2. "Begging for Mercy" - 3:55

== Personnel ==
Bullet for My Valentine

- Matthew "Matt" Tuck - lead vocals, rhythm guitar
- Jason "Jay" James - bass guitar, backing vocals
- Michael "Padge" Paget - lead guitar, backing vocals
- Michael "Moose" Thomas - drums

Additional musicians

- Matt Bond - piano on "The Last Fight (Acoustic Version)"

Production

- Produced by Don Gilmore
- Mixed by Chris Lord-Alge
- Music video directed by Paul R. Brown
