= Untitled My Chemical Romance album =

Upcoming studio album by My Chemical Romance

Studio album by My Chemical Romance
- Recorded: 2027

My Chemical Romance chronology
The Black Parade/Living with Ghosts (2016)	Untitled My Chemical Romance album (TBA)

The fifth studio album by the American rock band My Chemical Romance (sometimes referred to as MCR5) is scheduled to be recorded in 2027. It was officially announced during the band's performance at the Hollywood Bowl on October 30, 2026. My Chemical Romance plans to record the album throughout 2027, and to return to touring in 2028 after releasing the album. It will be the band's first studio album since Danger Days: The True Lives of the Fabulous Killjoys (2010).

Prior attempts by the band to create a fifth studio album were The Paper Kingdom in 2012, and in 2022 after the release of "The Foundations of Decay", both of which were scrapped.

== Background and production ==
My Chemical Romance released their fourth studio album, Danger Days: The True Lives of the Fabulous Killjoys, on November 22, 2010. In 2012, they began recording The Paper Kingdom, a project that was intended to be their fifth record. Audio engineer Doug McKean was helping produce the record. It was going to be a concept album about a support group of parents whose children had died. However, the band struggled with direction during the album's creation, leading to what guitarist Frank Iero described as a bleak production process and the music itself having a "weird sparseness to it". On March 22, 2013, My Chemical Romance announced their break-up, and that The Paper Kingdom was scrapped. One song from the album, "Fake Your Death", was included on their greatest hits album May Death Never Stop You (2014), and was poised as their final song.

The band announced their reunion on October 31, 2019, and played their first reunion show on December 20. In June 2021, the band's lead singer Gerard Way stated in an interview that he was working on music with McKean, although he did not initially specify whether it was for My Chemical Romance or Way's solo career. On May 12, 2022, the band released "The Foundations of Decay", their first single since "Fake Your Death" over eight years prior. After the song's release, the band planned to create more music, including potentially another album. However, McKean's death a couple of months later caused these plans to be cancelled, and left "The Foundations of Decay" as a standalone release.

After these projects were scrapped, a fifth My Chemical Romance album still remained a popular concept within the band's fanbase. On multiple occasions, fans would analyze promotional material the band released to try and find hints towards the release of new music. In early 2026, readers of Alternative Press voted a fifth My Chemical Romance album as their most anticipated music release.

During a concert in San Antonio on September 12, 2026, lead singer Gerard Way said that the band always wanted to make another album, and that they thought fans deserved it, although they did not know when it will be made. He remarked that, "we don’t know when it’ll be. But it’ll be awesome". On October 30, Gerard Way announced that the band plans to begin recording their fifth album in 2027. They plan to return to touring in 2028 after the album is complete, with no live shows planned for 2027.
