= Slaves to Gravity =

British rock band

- Origin: London, England
- Genres: Alternative rock, post-grunge, hard rock
- Years active: 2006–2011, 2018
- Label: Spinefarm Records
- Past members: Tommy Gleeson; Toshi Ogawa; Mark Verney; Jason Bowld; Jason Thomopoulos; Gemma Seddon
- Website: slavestogravity.com

Slaves to Gravity were a British alternative rock band. Formed in London in the summer of 2006, they played their final gig in October 2011.

== Career ==
Slaves To Gravity were formed by the three remaining members of London-based band The Ga Ga's, along with Mark Verney, formerly of Ariel-X, in 2006. Throughout late 2006 and early 2007 the band toured throughout the UK and US, and recorded their self-produced debut album at The Chapel Studios in Lincolnshire in summer 2007.

Scatter the Crow was mixed by Chris Sheldon, and released early in 2008 on the band's Gravitas label. Four singles from the album entered the UK rock chart singles Top 10, and the band were subsequently named Best British Newcomer at the 2008 Kerrang! Awards. They continued to tour throughout 2008, playing several headline runs as well as supporting The Goo Goo Dolls, Aiden, and Icelandic band Sign.

Following an appearance at SXSW, the band returned home to begin demoing their new material. In summer 2009, Slaves to Gravity went into Monnow Valley Studios in South Wales with US producer Bob Marlette to record their second album Underwaterouterspace over three weeks. The album was mixed at Marlette's Black Lava Studio in Los Angeles, but the release was delayed by over 18 months due to personnel changes and financial constraints.

In the meantime the band, with Jason Bowld of Bullet For My Valentine as a stand-in drummer, toured the UK with Black Spiders, Lacuna Coil, Alter Bridge and Buckcherry, and played at festivals including Sonisphere and Download.

Underwaterouterspace was finally released in early 2011. Following a headline show at London's Intrepid Fox, the band announced on Tumblr that they would split, and played their last show at the Relentless Freeze Festival at Battersea Power Station on 28 October 2011.

== Members ==
- Tommy Gleeson – vocals, guitar (2006–2011)
- Toshi Ogawa – bass guitar, backing vocals (2006–2011)
- Mark Verney – lead guitar, backing vocals (2006–2011)
- Jack Stephens – session drums (June – Oct 2011)
- Jason Bowld – drums (2010–2011)
- Gemma Seddon – drums (2009–2010)
- Jason Thomopoulos – drums (2006–2009)

== Discography ==
=== Albums ===
- 2008: Scatter the Crow
- 2011: UnderWaterOuterSpace

=== Singles ===
Year	Title	Chart positions	
Year	Title	UK Singles Chart	UK Rock Chart
2007	"Big Red"	–	3
2007	"Meantime"	–	4
2008	"Mr. Regulator"	–	5
2009	"Doll Size"	–	–
2010	"Good Advice"	–	–
2010	"Honesty"	–	–
2011	"Silence Now"	–	–

== Awards ==
- Kerrang!: Best British Newcomer (2008)
