= The Ga Ga's =

English rock band

THE*GA*GA*S
- Origin: London, England
- Genres: Alternative rock, post-grunge, hard rock
- Years active: 2002–2006
- Labels: Sanctuary Records
- Past members: Tommy Gleeson; Toshi Ogawa; Jason Thomopoulos; Rob Willis

THE*GA*GA*S (also spelled as The Ga Ga's) were an English hard rock band formed by Tommy Gleeson in 2002. Following the band's demise in 2006, three of the band's members would go on to form Slaves to Gravity. Throughout the band's career, they played through Europe, Japan, America and played with acts such as Velvet Revolver, Biffy Clyro, The Wildhearts, Skid Row, Whitesnake and Andrew WK.

During an interview with the band in 2005, Gleeson states that: "We’re not the kind of band that if one left, we’d just get another guy in. It’s about us as four guys, our styles and who we are as people. There’s no replacement member, that’s how we knew the band was strong." On 1 June 2006 the following appeared on the band's MySpace:

In May, when Rob left the band we had undoubtedly reached a crossroads in our lives. The constant set-backs and let-downs of the last 12 months had left us all feeling exhausted and disillusioned, and we knew that to survive, something had to change. We've looked deep into ourselves and come to the conclusion that now is the time to begin again. We've had 4 amazing years as THE*GA*GA*S, learning a lot about the way things really work in this business, and sharing our music and our lives with you all. None of us would change this experience for the world, and we thank every single one of you who has supported us throughout. We are forever indebted.

In 2005, the band were nominated for a Kerrang! award for 'Best British Newcomer', an award Slaves to Gravity would go on to win in 2008.

In 2016, Gleeson would later become the live-only guitarist on Feeder's UK and Ireland tour, after Snow Patrol's Nathan Conolly was unable to attend due to his commitments with said band.

== Discography ==
=== Studio albums ===
- 2005: Tonight the Midway Shines

=== Singles ===
- 2003: "Breaking America"
- 2004: "Replica"/"KO"
- 2004: "Sex"
- 2005: "Crash and Burn"
