= Scream Aim Fire =

Studio album by Bullet for My Valentine
- Released: 28 January 2008
- Recorded: September 2006 – November 2007
- Studios: Sonic Ranch, Texas; Rockfield, Monmouthshire; Nott-in-Pill Studios, Newport; The Dairy, London
- Genres: Thrash metal; melodic metalcore
- Length: 52:31
- Labels: Jive; 20-20 Entertainment LLC
- Producer: Colin Richardson

Bullet for My Valentine chronology
The Poison (2005)	Scream Aim Fire (2008)	Fever (2010)

Singles from Scream Aim Fire
- 1. "Scream Aim Fire" Released: 18 December 2007; 2. "Hearts Burst into Fire" Released: 31 March 2008; 3. "Waking the Demon" Released: 25 April 2008

Deluxe edition cover
- Artwork used for the deluxe edition cover

Scream Aim Fire is the second studio album by Welsh heavy metal band Bullet for My Valentine. The album was released on 28 January 2008 in the United Kingdom and the preceding day in the United States through Jive Records. Since its release, Scream Aim Fire has sold over 1,400,000 copies worldwide. It is the band's most commercially successful effort in Australia, earning a gold certification by the Australian Recording Industry Association (ARIA) in addition to a gold certification from both the band's native British Phonographic Industry (BPI) in the United Kingdom and the Bundesverband Musikindustrie (BVMI) in Germany.

In contrast to Bullet for My Valentine's debut, The Poison (2005), Scream Aim Fire explores a thrash metal style in addition to the band's melodic metalcore sound.

== Music style and background ==
With a style different from that of Bullet for My Valentine's previous album The Poison, Scream Aim Fire has less screaming but much more aggressive instrumentation. The album features a thrash metal style in addition to their previously established metalcore sound.

== Writing and recording ==
Recording of the album was complete in November 2007 with vocalist/guitarist Matthew Tuck telling Kerrang! magazine he was looking forward to be working with guest producer Alec Cartio again.

== Release and promotion ==
At midnight on 28 January, Bullet for My Valentine were present in Cardiff to do an album signing to go with the release of the album. At 18:00 the same day, an in-store gig at HMV in Oxford Circus saw "Scream Aim Fire" being performed along with the live debuts of "Disappear" and "Waking the Demon", followed by a signing session for the 300 attendees.

A 15-minute album commentary was released on the US digital single for "Scream Aim Fire", released on 18 December 2007, along with the track "Eye of the Storm", which was also released on a free Kerrang! CD and as a free download for signing up to the Sony BMG mailing list.

The second single from the album, "Hearts Burst into Fire", was announced by the band during their UK tour. Matt Tuck said that the band recorded the song live for the music video.

"Waking the Demon" is the third and final single of the album.

== Reception ==
=== Critical ===
Professional ratings
Review scores
Source	Rating
About.com	3.5/5 stars
AbsolutePunk	76%
AllMusic	4/5 stars
BBC	(Positive)
Drowned in Sound	6/10 stars
IGN	(6.7/10)
Kerrang!	3/5 stars
Metal Hammer	8/10 stars
MusicOMH	3.5/5 stars
Total Guitar	5/5 stars
NME	4/5 stars
Ultimate Guitar	(7/10)

Critical reception to Scream Aim Fire has been mostly positive.

Katherine Fulton of AllMusic awarded the album 4 stars out of 5, commenting that the band "maintains a blistering pace throughout most of Scream Aim Fire, not even slowing down for "Hearts Burst Into Fire," the first of two love songs featured on the album." Fulton concluded that the album is "definitely harder and more aggressive than the band's debut album, The Poison, which had a sound evenly divided between emo and metal."

Mike Sterry of NME also awarded the album 4 stars out of 5, stating that it "might have pretensions about the current political climate but to us it sounds like the soundtrack to the zombie holocaust: the heartbreak of unloading a 12-gauge into your eldest child, rebuilding a ruined world one grain at a time and putting down millions of dead."

Ultimate Guitar scored the album a 7/10, stating that "each song features beautifully executed riffs and there are solos galore. The opening title track Scream Aim Fire is solid example, with everything from a driving intro to some killer pinch harmonics midway through." The reviewer, however, added that "the most aggressive tracks aren't what make the biggest impression on Scream Aim Fire. Say Goodnight could easily be the best tune on the album, with a clean, stripped-down intro and unaffected vocals delivered by Tuck."

Some reviews of the album were less enthusiastic. Chris Nettleton of Drowned in Sound scored the album a 6/10, writing that "where you would have liked them to open a few new doors in the search to find a sound that was distinctly their own, they appear to have just piled on more Maiden, more Metallica, more Slayer, and a dash of Slipknot drumming. It’s unlikely to estrange anyone who likes them already, but I’m not sure Scream Aim Fire is going to win too many new acolytes." Andrew Blackie of PopMatters panned the album, commenting, "The lyrics are on a parallel with the music’s one-dimensionality and tonelessness, the choruses are even more samey and interchangeable than they were on The Poison. There is also a greater distance than ever between dreary pedal to the metal numb-rock and equally insipid mushy power ballads, swinging the album’s core into sudden highs and lows throughout like a diabetic."

=== Commercial ===
The album went straight to number 5 in the UK albums chart and number 4 in the Australian album charts. Additionally, it hit number 4 on the Billboard 200, with first week sales of about 53,000. Since its release, Scream Aim Fire has sold over 1,000,000 copies worldwide.

The title track of the album is featured in the video game Guitar Hero World Tour. The track "Waking the Demon" is available for download for both Rock Band and Rock Band 2 for the price of $1.99. "Scream Aim Fire", "Tears Don't Fall", as well as, "Your Betrayal" are available on Rock Band 3 in a pack for $5.49 for the three or $1.99 Individually. The track "Hearts Burst into Fire" is featured in the video game NHL 09.

== Track listing ==
All lyrics are written by Matt Tuck, except "Take It Out on Me" by Tuck and Benji Webbe; all music is composed by Bullet for My Valentine.

No.	Title	Length
1.	"Scream Aim Fire"	4:26
2.	"Eye of the Storm"	4:02
3.	"Hearts Burst into Fire"	4:57
4.	"Waking the Demon"	4:07
5.	"Disappear"	4:05
6.	"Deliver Us from Evil"	5:58
7.	"Take It Out on Me" (featuring Benji Webbe)	5:52
8.	"Say Goodnight"	4:43
9.	"End of Days"	4:18
10.	"Last to Know"	3:17
11.	"Forever and Always"	6:46
Total length:		52:31

Deluxe edition
No.	Title	Length
12.	"Road to Nowhere"	4:19
13.	"Watching Us Die Tonight"	3:53
14.	"One Good Reason Why"	4:04
15.	"Ashes of the Innocent"	4:17
Total length:		69:04

Japanese limited edition
No.	Title	Length
12.	"No Easy Way Out" (Robert Tepper cover)	4:32
13.	"Ashes of the Innocent"	4:15
14.	"Hearts Burst into Fire" (Acoustic)	3:56
15.	"Creeping Death" (Metallica cover)	6:39
16.	"Crazy Train" (Ozzy Osbourne cover)	4:51
Total length:		76:44

Digipak, USB and vinyl edition
No.	Title	Length
12.	"Ashes of the Innocent"	4:17
Total length:		56:48

iTunes edition
No.	Title	Length
12.	"Creeping Death" (Metallica cover)	6:39
13.	"Ashes of the Innocent" (pre-order bonus track)	4:14
Total length:		63:24

German iTunes edition
No.	Title	Length
12.	"Say Goodnight" (Acoustic)	3:14
Total length:		55:45

=== DVDs ===
==== Japanese limited edition DVD ====
- "Scream Aim Fire" music video
- The Making of "Scream Aim Fire"
- Bullet TV:
  - Welcome to the Studio
  - Sonic Ranch Cribs
  - Night at the Ranch
  - Quad Pinching
- Photo Gallery
- Scream Aim Fire: The Comics

==== Deluxe edition DVD ====
- 3 music videos:
  - Scream Aim Fire
  - Waking the Demon
  - Hearts Burst into Fire
- Bullet TV:
  - Drinking
  - Switzerland
  - Japan
  - Travel to Oz
  - Australia/New Zealand

=== USB edition ===
Bullet for My Valentine have also released the album on a metal bullet-shaped Flash Drive with the band's symbol engraved into it. The bullet-shaped Flash Drive has the same properties as the Special Edition CD, with the inclusion of a 15-minute track-by-track video commentary, 4 wallpapers, and the booklet/insert in PDF format.

== Personnel ==
Credits adapted from the CD liner notes.

Bullet for My Valentine

- Matthew Tuck – lead vocals, guitar, bass (uncredited)
- Michael "Moose" Thomas – drums
- Michael "Padge" Paget – guitar, backing vocals
- Jay James – bass (credited but does not perform), vocals

Additional musician

- Benji Webbe – additional vocals/lyrics on "Take It Out on Me"

Production

- Colin Richardson – producer, mixing at Strongroom Studios, London
- Matt Hyde – engineering
- Ginge Ford – engineering
- Jeff Rose – engineering
- Ted Jensen – mastering at Sterling Sound, New York City

Art

- Jeff Gilligan – art direction, design
- Don Clark – photo-illustrations for Invisible Creature
- Chapman Baehler – photography

== Charts ==
=== Weekly charts ===
Chart (2008)	Peak position
Australian Albums (ARIA)	4
Austrian Albums (Ö3 Austria)	3
Canadian Albums (Billboard)	14
European Albums (Billboard)	3
Finnish Albums (Suomen virallinen lista)	8
French Albums (SNEP)	38
German Albums (Offizielle Top 100)	3
Irish Albums (IRMA)	10
Japanese Albums (Oricon)	1
New Zealand Albums (RMZN)	29
Scottish Albums (Official Charts)	7
Swedish Albums (Sverigetopplistan)	5
Swiss Albums (Schweizer Hitparade)	18
UK Albums (Official Charts)	5
UK Rock & Metal Albums (Official Charts)	1
US Billboard 200	4
US Top Alternative Albums (Billboard)	2
US Independent Albums (Billboard)	1
US Top Rock Albums (Billboard)	2
US Top Hard Rock Albums (Billboard)	2

=== Year-end charts ===
Chart (2008)	Position
German Albums (Offizielle Top 100)	78

=== Singles ===
Year	Title	Peak chart positions				
Year	Title	UK Singles Chart	UK Rock Chart	US Modern Rock	US Mainstream Rock	German Singles Chart
2007	"Scream Aim Fire"	34	1	26	16	58
2008	"Hearts Burst into Fire"	66	1	—	22	99
2008	"Waking the Demon"	—	1	—	39	—

== Certifications ==
Region	Certification	Certified units/sales
Australia (ARIA)	Gold	35,000^{^}
Germany (BVMI)	Gold	100,000^{‡}
United Kingdom (BPI)	Gold	100,000^{^}
^{^} Shipments figures based on certification alone.^{‡} Sales+streaming figures based on certification alone.
