= Hearts Burst into Fire =

Single by Bullet for My Valentine

from the album Scream Aim Fire
- B-side: "Hearts Burst into Fire" (acoustic version)
- Released: 31 March 2008
- Studio: Sonic Ranch, El Paso, Texas
- Genre: Metalcore
- Length: 4:57
- Songwriters: Matthew Tuck; Michael Paget; Michael Thomas; Jason James
- Producer: Colin Richardson

Bullet for My Valentine singles chronology
"Scream Aim Fire" (2007)	"Hearts Burst into Fire" (2008)	"Waking the Demon" (2008)

Alternative cover
- UK single

"Hearts Burst into Fire" is a song by the Welsh heavy metal band Bullet for My Valentine. It was released as the second single from their 2008 album, Scream Aim Fire. The song was featured in the video game NHL 09.

Fans regard the song's guitar solo as being among the best in the metalcore genre, according to Loudwire.

== Musical style ==
IGN described the song as a "melodic pop-metal anthem" and MetalSucks as pop-punk.

== Music video ==
The video of the song is a montage of clips from the tour accompanying the album. It features fans displaying support for the band, many of whom display logos and tattoos featuring song names and lyrics by the band.

== Track listing ==
2 Track Single

1. "Hearts Burst into Fire" - 4:57
2. "Hearts Burst into Fire (Acoustic)" - 3:58

7" Single

1. "Hearts Burst into Fire" - 4:57
2. "No Easy Way Out" - 4:32

Promotional Single

1. "Hearts Burst into Fire (Radio Edit)" - 4:15
2. "Hearts Burst into Fire (Clean Album Version)" - 4:58
3. "Hearts Burst into Fire (UK Edit)" - 3:39

== Personnel ==
- Matthew "Matt" Tuck – lead vocals, rhythm guitar, intro guitar solo
- Michael "Padge" Paget – lead guitar, backing vocals
- Michael "Moose" Thomas – drums
- Jason "Jay" James – bass guitar, backing vocals

== Charts ==
Chart (2008)	Peak position
Germany (GfK)	99
Scotland Singles (OCC)	24
UK Singles (OCC)	66
US Mainstream Rock (Billboard)	22
