= Scream Aim Fire (song) =

Single by Bullet for My Valentine

from the album Scream Aim Fire
- B-side: "Forever and Always"
- Released: 18 December 2007
- Recorded: 2007
- Studio: Strongroom, London
- Genre: Thrash metal; melodic metalcore
- Length: 4:26
- Label: Jive; Sony BMG
- Songwriters: Matthew Tuck; Michael Paget; Michael Thomas; Jason James
- Producer: Colin Richardson

Bullet for My Valentine singles chronology
"Tears Don't Fall" (2006)	"Scream Aim Fire" (2007)	"Hearts Burst into Fire" (2008)

"Scream Aim Fire" is a song by Welsh heavy metal band Bullet for My Valentine. It was released as the lead single from their second album, Scream Aim Fire on the American iTunes store on 18 December 2007, and has also been released on the band's Myspace profile. Featured in the video games Guitar Hero World Tour and non-US versions of Guitar Hero Modern Hits, it is the band's highest charting single worldwide. It is also available as downloadable content in the video game Rock Band 3. A live version of the song recorded at BBC Radio 1's Live Lounge show was included as a bonus track on deluxe editions of the band's fourth studio album, Temper Temper.

== Music video ==
The music video shows the band performing in a warehouse. Images of war are displayed on large screens throughout the video, which are parallel to the band. The video is purely band performance, cross cut between close ups of singer Matt Tuck, and the performance of the rest of the band. The lyrics of the song are about "going to war" as Matt Tuck describes during live shows. For example, they scream "over the top" several times in the song, a reference to World War I trench warfare. The video was directed by Tony Petrossian.

== Release history ==
Country	Release date
United States iTunes	18 December 2007
Worldwide	21 January 2008

== Charts ==
Chart (2008)	Peak position
Germany (GfK)	58
Sweden (Sverigetopplistan)	49
Scottish Singles Sales (Official Charts)	7
UK Singles (OCC)	34
UK Rock and Metal (OCC)	1
US Mainstream Rock (Billboard)	16
US Alternative Airplay (Billboard)	26

== Track listing ==
CD single

1. "Scream Aim Fire" – 4:26

CD and UK digital edition

1. "Scream Aim Fire" – 4:26
2. "Forever and Always" (acoustic) – 4:19

Red cover vinyl

1. "Scream Aim Fire" – 4:26
2. "Creeping Death" (Metallica cover) – 6:40

White cover vinyl

1. "Scream Aim Fire" – 4:26
2. "Crazy Train" (Ozzy Osbourne cover) – 4:51

== Personnel ==
- Matthew "Matt" Tuck – lead vocals, rhythm guitar
- Michael "Padge" Paget – lead guitar, backing vocals
- Jason "Jay" James – bass guitar, backing vocals
- Michael "Moose" Thomas – drums

== See also ==
- List of anti-war songs
