= Waking the Demon =

Single by Bullet for My Valentine

from the album Scream Aim Fire
- B-side: "Say Goodnight" (acoustic)
- Released: 25 April 2008
- Recorded: 2007
- Genre: Metalcore
- Length: 4:08
- Label: Jive
- Songwriters: Matthew Tuck; Michael Paget; Michael Thomas; Jason James
- Producer: Colin Richardson

Bullet for My Valentine singles chronology
"Hearts Burst into Fire" (2008)	"Waking the Demon" (2008)	"Your Betrayal" (2010)

Music video
- "Waking the Demon" on YouTube

"Waking the Demon" is a song by Welsh heavy metal band Bullet for My Valentine. The song was released on 25 April 2008 as the third and final single from their second album Scream Aim Fire. The video for the song was written and directed by Max Nichols (son of Academy Award-winning director Mike Nichols).

The video was released on 16 April 2008 as the band's MySpace video. On 7 April 2009, "Waking the Demon" was released as a downloadable song for Rock Band.

== Lyrics ==
The track's lyrics explore the theme of revenge. Vocalist-guitarist Matt Tuck said:

"Waking the Demon" is about finding someone's inner demon. Most of us in the band got pushed around in school so the song is about getting tormented, day in and day out for years, and then one day – 'snap!' – fight back!

== Music video ==
The video is about a teenage heavy metal fan (Cohlie Brocato) who is bullied in high school by a jock (Noah Fleiss). The leader of the group is dating a girl who seems sympathetic towards the boy, but is not brave enough to stand up for him. There are numerous shots of the band playing in a moonlit forest. Throughout the video, the jock repeatedly attacks the boy, including spraying water on him in the locker room, dumping a Strawberry shake on him in class, tripping him, pushing him into walls and smacking him with a towel.

Meanwhile, as the days pass, the teenager crosses off dates on a calendar in his locker. He circles the last date, the 28th, which is labeled "Full Moon". That night, he watches the jocks' leader waiting in the forest for his girlfriend, who lured him to the forest by asking to meet him there so that the teenage boy could get revenge on him. The teenager throws a balloon filled with cottage cheese at the jock's car to provoke him to chase him deeper into the forest. The scene leads up to the solo as the jock chases the boy through the forest.

As the guitar solo starts, the teenager falls down on his knees and the full moon comes out of the clouds, turning him into a werewolf. The bully approaches the now changed boy. Once the jock sees the teenage victim's face, the jock is horrified and tries to run, but the video implies that he was slaughtered by the werewolf. Blood drips from the werewolf's mouth and hands. The next day at school, there is a new sign displaying the original bully as missing. Now, another jock tries to show his anger towards the teenager and tries to harass him a little bit.

The girl who dated the old bully runs up and hugs the new bully, hinting that she's going out with him after news that the leader went missing. As the other jock walks off with the girl, she looks at the teenager, giving him a look of "I'm on your side" and he sees her eyes glow red (revealing that she also is a werewolf like himself). He smiles knowing that her new "boyfriend" will be the next victim, and crosses out the first day of the next month waiting for the full moon to come again, implying that the new jock won't be able to harass him so easily.

As of August 2024, the song has 89 million views on YouTube.

== Track listing ==
iTunes Single

1. "Waking the Demon" (Rock Radio Mix) – 4:07
2. "Say Goodnight" (acoustic version) – 3:14

== Personnel ==
Bullet for My Valentine

- Matthew "Matt" Tuck – lead vocals, rhythm guitar
- Michael "Padge" Paget – lead guitar
- Michael "Moose" Thomas – drums
- Jason "Jay" James – bass guitar, backing vocals

Production

- Produced by Colin Richardson
- Music video directed by Max Nicols

== Release history ==
Country	Date	Format
United States	21 April 2008	CD single
United Kingdom	16 June 2008	iTunes
Japan	16 June 2008	EP
South Korea	16 June 2008	EP

== Charts ==
Chart (2008)	Peak Position
US Mainstream Rock (Billboard)	39
