= Your Betrayal =

Single by Bullet for My Valentine

from the album Fever
- B-side: "Begging for Mercy"
- Released: 2 March 2010
- Genre: Metalcore; heavy metal
- Length: 4:51
- Label: Jive
- Songwriters: Don Gilmore; Jason James; Michael Paget; Michael Thomas; Matthew Tuck
- Producer: Don Gilmore

Bullet for My Valentine singles chronology
"Waking the Demon" (2008)	"Your Betrayal" (2010)	"The Last Fight" (2010)

Music video
- "Your Betrayal" on YouTube

"Your Betrayal" is a song by Welsh heavy metal band Bullet for My Valentine and was released as the first and lead US single from their third album, Fever. The song was set for release on 8 March 2010 to the radio; and, unexpectedly, was released early as a Digital 45 on iTunes along with the track "Begging for Mercy" on 2 March 2010. Before that, "Begging for Mercy" was offered for free download on 14 February 2010 from the band's official website for a limited time. "Your Betrayal" was nominated for the Kerrang! Award for Best Single.

== Music video ==
The music video for the song premiered on 12 April 2010, which was directed by P. R. Brown. The video features the band playing while fire is in the background. Scenes behind the flames show two girls, identical twin actress/models Ginamarie Russo and Annamarie Russo, committing each of the seven deadly sins. The twins can be seen as each of the deadly sins and performing side by side for the deadly sin "Pride". The video ends with the screen fully engulfed in flames.

== Track listing ==
Digital 45

1. "Your Betrayal" – 4:52
2. "Begging for Mercy" – 3:55

== Personnel ==
Bullet for My Valentine

- Matthew "Matt" Tuck – lead vocals, rhythm guitar, guitar solo intro
- Jason "Jay" James – bass guitar, backing vocals
- Michael "Padge" Paget – lead guitar
- Michael "Moose" Thomas – drums

Production

- Produced by Don Gilmore
- Mixed by Chris Lord-Alge
- Mastered by Ted Jensen
- Music video directed by Paul R. Brown

== In popular culture ==
The song was used in the TV spot for the film Salt.

== Charts ==
Chart (2010)	Peak position
Czech Republic Rock (IFPI)	17
UK Singles (OCC)	197
UK Rock & Metal (Official Charts)	10
US Alternative Airplay (Billboard)	25
US Bubbling Under Hot 100 (Billboard)	25
US Hot Rock & Alternative Songs (Billboard)	18
US Mainstream Rock (Billboard)	5
US Rock & Alternative Airplay (Billboard)	18

== Certifications ==
Region	Certification	Certified units/sales
United Kingdom (BPI)	Silver	200,000^{‡}
^{‡} Sales+streaming figures based on certification alone.
