= My Chemical Romance =

American rock band

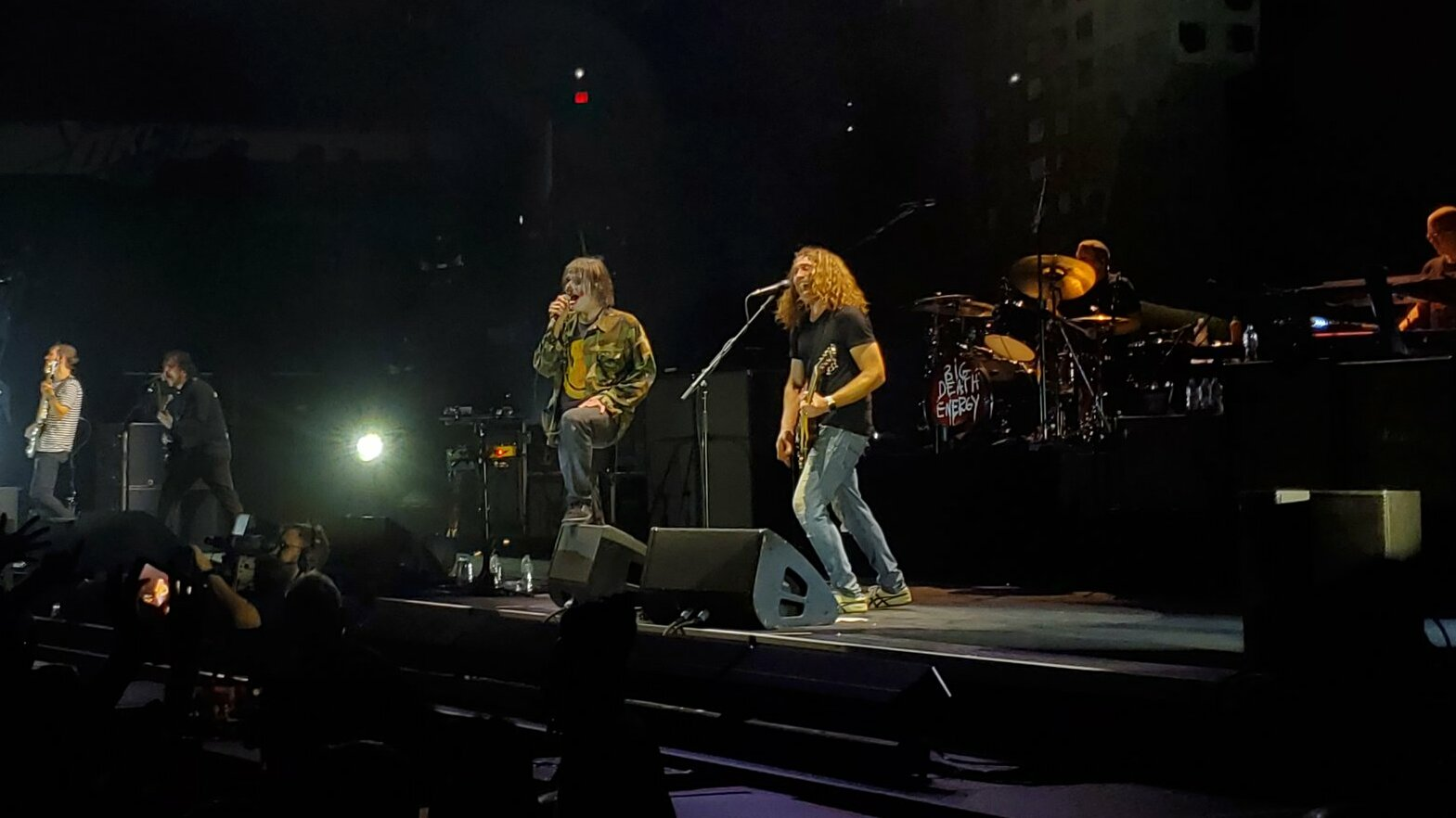
- My Chemical Romance in Oklahoma City, 2022. From left to right: Mikey Way, Frank Iero, Gerard Way, Ray Toro, Jarrod Alexander, and Jamie Muhoberac

Background information
- Origin: New Jersey, U.S. (Note: Some sources say the band formed in Newark while others claim they formed in Belleville.)
- Genres: Alternative rock; emo; pop-punk; post-hardcore
- Works: Discography; songs
- Years active: 2001–2013; 2019–present
- Labels: Eyeball; Reprise; Warner
- Spinoffs: Death Spells
- Members: Gerard Way; Ray Toro; Mikey Way; Frank Iero
- Past members: Matt Pelissier; Bob Bryar; James Dewees
- Website: mychemicalromance.com
- Logo

My Chemical Romance (Note: Often abbreviated as MCR or My Chem) is an American rock band from New Jersey. The band's current lineup consists of lead vocalist Gerard Way, lead guitarist Ray Toro, rhythm guitarist Frank Iero, and bassist Mikey Way. They are considered one of the most influential rock groups of the 2000s and a major act in the emo and pop-punk genres, despite the band rejecting the former label.

Formed in September 2001 by Gerard, Mikey, Toro, and drummer Matt Pelissier (and later joined by Iero), the band signed with Eyeball Records and released their debut album, I Brought You My Bullets, You Brought Me Your Love, in 2002. They signed with Reprise Records the next year and released their major-label debut, Three Cheers for Sweet Revenge, in 2004. Shortly after the album's release, Pelissier was replaced by Bob Bryar. The album was a commercial success, attaining platinum status over a year later.

The success of the band's previous albums was eclipsed by that of their 2006 rock opera concept album, The Black Parade. A major commercial success, its lead single "Welcome to the Black Parade" topped the UK singles chart. The album solidified the band's following, with negative coverage in the Daily Mail generating controversy. The band's fourth studio album, Danger Days: The True Lives of the Fabulous Killjoys, was released in 2010. Bryar departed the band prior to the release of the album, and in 2012, they added touring keyboardist James Dewees. In 2012 and 2013, the band released a series of singles they had recorded in 2009 under the collective title Conventional Weapons. Despite initially sharing plans for a fifth studio album, My Chemical Romance announced its breakup on March 22, 2013. They released a greatest hits album, May Death Never Stop You, in 2014.

The band announced their reunion in October 2019, with a reunion show taking place in December. They followed it up with announcements for other shows and a Reunion Tour, which took place in 2022 and ended in early 2023. They released "The Foundations of Decay", their first new release in eight years, in May 2022. An untitled fifth studio album is set to begin recording in 2027.

== History ==
=== 2001–2002: Formation and I Brought You My Bullets, You Brought Me Your Love ===
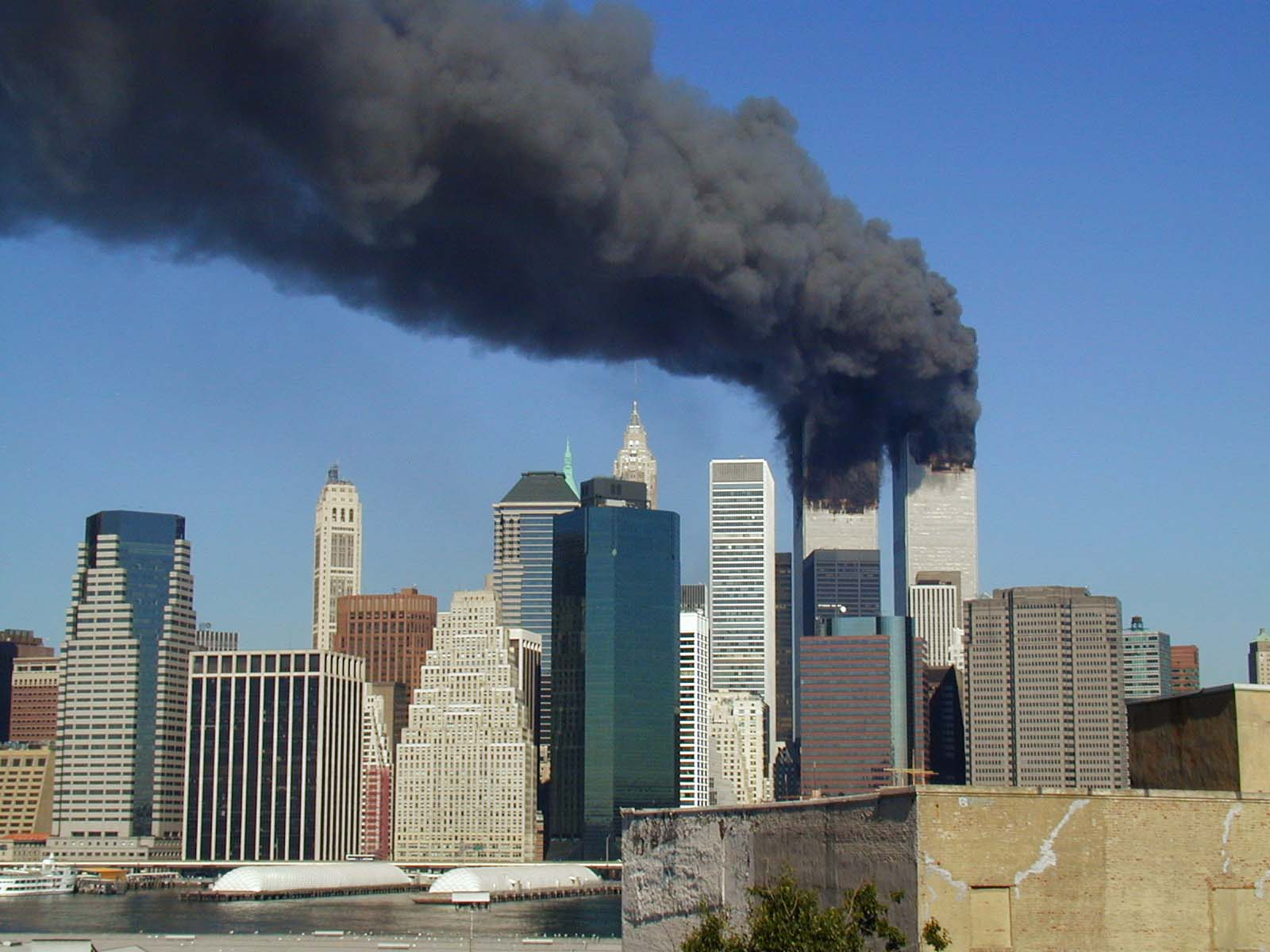
Witnessing the September 11 attacks influenced Gerard Way to form My Chemical Romance.

The band was formed by vocalist Gerard Way and drummer Matt Pelissier in New Jersey, soon after the September 11 attacks. Witnessing the World Trade Center towers fall influenced Way's life to the extent that he decided to start a band. Shortly thereafter, Ray Toro was recruited as the band's guitarist because, at the time, Way could not sing and play the guitar simultaneously. Way has said, "Music was this thing I secretly wanted to do", and later wrote the song "Skylines and Turnstiles" to express his feelings about September 11.

The name of the band was suggested by bass guitarist Mikey Way, younger brother of Gerard, who was working in a Barnes & Noble when he was struck by the title of a book by Irvine Welsh named Ecstasy: Three Tales of Chemical Romance. The first recording sessions were undertaken in Pelissier's attic, where the songs "Our Lady of Sorrows" and "Cubicles" were recorded. The band refers to those sessions as "The Attic Demos". After hearing the demo and dropping out of college, Mikey Way decided to join the band. While with Eyeball Records, the band met Frank Iero, the lead vocalist and guitarist for Pencey Prep. Following Pencey Prep's split in 2002, Iero became a member of My Chemical Romance just days before the recording of the band's debut album.

They recorded their debut album, I Brought You My Bullets, You Brought Me Your Love, just three months after the formation of the band and released it in 2002 through Eyeball Records. The album was produced by Thursday frontman Geoff Rickly after the band became friends with him while playing shows in New Jersey. Iero played guitar on two of the tracks, namely "Honey, This Mirror Isn't Big Enough for the Two of Us" and "Early Sunsets Over Monroeville". During this time, the band was booked at the infamous venue Big Daddy's, where it began to receive more attention. The album produced two singles, "Honey, This Mirror Isn't Big Enough for the Two of Us" on December 13, 2003, and "Headfirst for Halos" on April 3, 2004. My Chemical Romance offered free downloads through PureVolume and the social networking website MySpace, where they gained an initial fan base.

=== 2003–2006: Major label signing and Three Cheers for Sweet Revenge ===
On August 31, 2003, the band announced via their website that they had signed a deal with Reprise Records. The band's second album, Three Cheers for Sweet Revenge, was released on June 8, 2004. A month after the album's release, the band replaced Matt Pelissier with Bob Bryar. The band released three singles from the album: "I'm Not Okay (I Promise)", "Helena", and "The Ghost of You". The album went platinum in just over a year after its release.

At the beginning of 2005, the band was featured on the first Taste of Chaos tour along with the Used and Killswitch Engage. The band was also the opening act for Green Day on their American Idiot tour. They then co-headlined Warped Tour 2005 with Fall Out Boy and co-headlined a tour with Alkaline Trio and Reggie and the Full Effect around the US. That same year, My Chemical Romance collaborated with the Used for a cover of the Queen and David Bowie song, "Under Pressure", which was released as a benefit single for tsunami relief on iTunes and other Internet outlets.

In March 2006, the album Life on the Murder Scene was released, incorporating a CD and two DVDs. It included one documentary DVD chronicling the band's history and a second DVD with music videos, the making of their videos, and live performances. An unauthorized biography DVD, Things That Make You Go MMM!, was also released in June 2006. The DVD does not actually feature any My Chemical Romance music clips or performances but contains interviews with those who knew the band before much of their fame. A biography titled Something Incredible This Way Comes was also released, written by Paul Stenning and published in 2006. It features information on their beginnings up to their third album, The Black Parade.

=== 2006–2009: The Black Parade ===
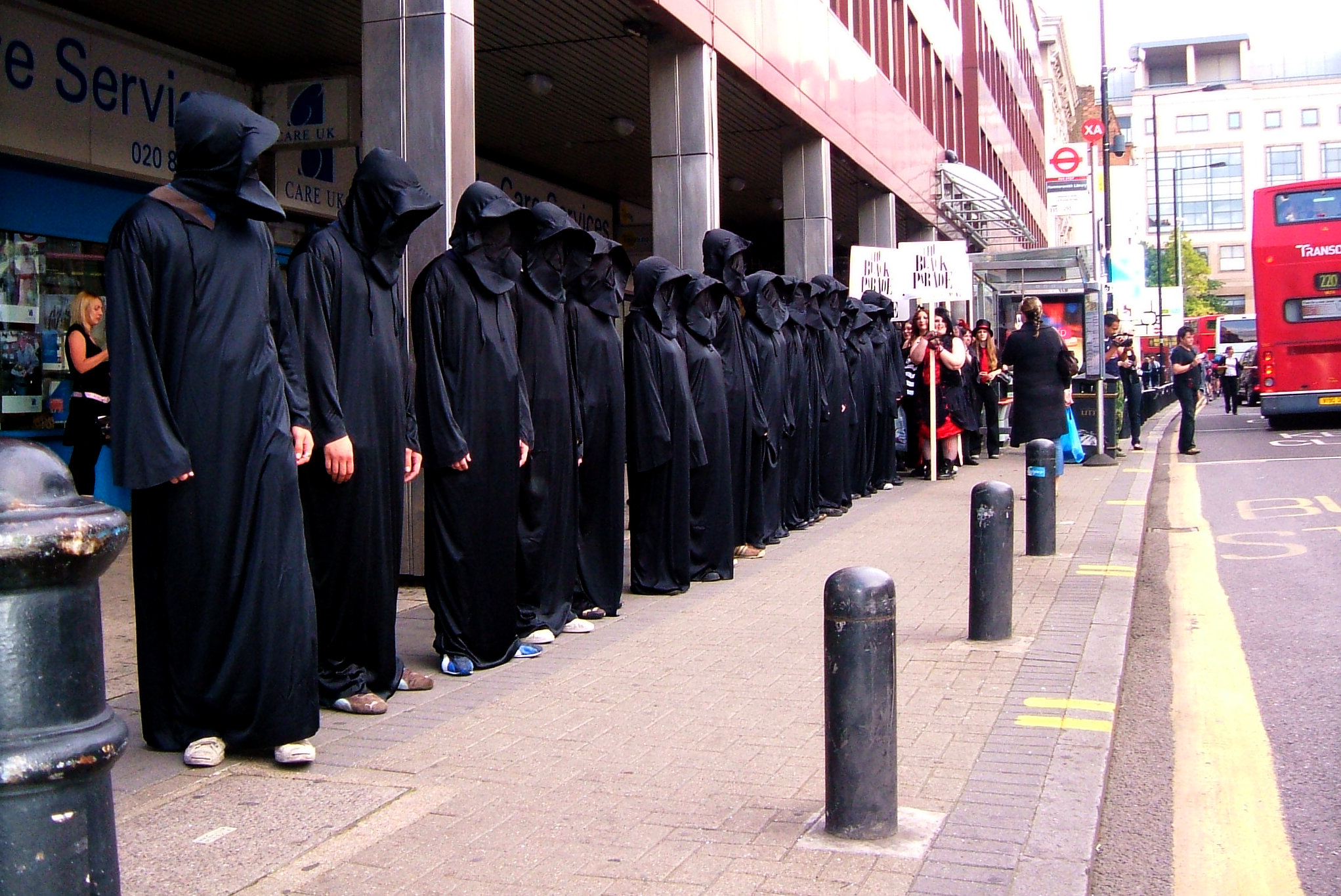
Announcement of The Black Parade at London Hammersmith Palais on August 22, 2006

My Chemical Romance started recording their third studio album on April 10, 2006, with Rob Cavallo, producer of many of Green Day's albums. On August 3, 2006, the band completed shooting the videos for their first two singles from the album, "Welcome to the Black Parade" and, although not released until January 2007, "Famous Last Words". Both videos were directed by Samuel Bayer, director of Nirvana's "Smells Like Teen Spirit", as well as the music videos for the Green Day album American Idiot. During filming for the second video, band members Gerard Way and Bob Bryar were injured. Way suffered torn ligaments in his ankle, and Bryar suffered third-degree burns on his hands and legs. Consequently, the band was forced to cancel a few tour dates.

On August 22, 2006, the band played a special one-off show at the 1,800-capacity Hammersmith Palais in London. The show was sold out in 15 minutes. Later during the show, the album title was confirmed. The band was bottled during a performance at the Reading Festival by fans of the band Slayer, who performed before them at the festival; Way later described it as their "greatest victory as a show".

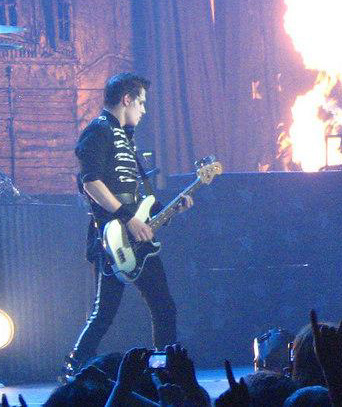
Bassist Mikey Way, dressed in his Black Parade uniform

"Welcome to the Black Parade" was released as a single on September 12, 2006. A music video for the song, directed by Samuel Bayer and starring Lukas Haas as "The Patient", was released later that same month. The single became the band's first number-one on the UK Singles Chart in October 2006. The Black Parade was released on October 23, 2006. In the US, "Welcome to the Black Parade" reached number nine on the Billboard Hot 100, making it the band's only top-ten hit to date on the chart.

The Black Parade World Tour started on February 22, 2007, featuring Rise Against and Muse as support acts. Reggie and the Full Effect frontman James Dewees joined the band to play keyboards and synthesizer from then on. In April 2007, it was announced that Mikey Way would temporarily leave the tour to spend time with his new wife, Alicia Simmons-Way. Way's temporary replacement was Matt Cortez, a friend of the band. During the third leg of the tour, as a support act for Muse, members of My Chemical Romance and their crew, along with members of Muse's crew, suffered food poisoning and, consequently, had to cancel shows. The band later featured on Linkin Park's Projekt Revolution tour in 2007, along with Placebo, Mindless Self Indulgence, Saosin, Taking Back Sunday, and HIM.

My Chemical Romance received a range of accolades for The Black Parade. Kerrang! rated The Black Parade as the fourth-greatest album of 2006. In Rolling Stone magazine's ranking of the top 50 albums of 2006, The Black Parade was voted the 20th best album of the year and 361st on their top 500 albums of all time. My Chemical Romance went on to win Best International Band at the 2007 NME Awards, and Gerard Way also won Hero of the Year. The band was also nominated for Best Alternative Group at the 2007 American Music Awards.

During the height of the album's popularity, British tabloid Daily Mail characterized the band and their fans as an emo "cult of self-harm" and published articles regarding the band with intentionally inflammatory headlines. One such article, "Why No Child is Safe From the Sinister Cult of Emo", published in 2008, linked the suicide of a thirteen-year-old British girl to an alleged "emo cult", which the tabloid used to characterize My Chemical Romance's fandom. In response to the newspaper's coverage of the band, over 300 British fans planned a protest march throughout London, ending at the tabloid's office. However, after concerns from the police, the march was called off, and about 100 fans instead congregated at Marble Arch. The Daily Mail defended their position and coverage of the band, saying that it was "balanced and restrained", "in the public interest", and that they were reporting genuine concerns raised by the coroner at the inquest. They pointed to other newspapers publishing such stories at the time, as well as to their publishing of readers' letters defending the band and positive reviews of the band's albums and tours.

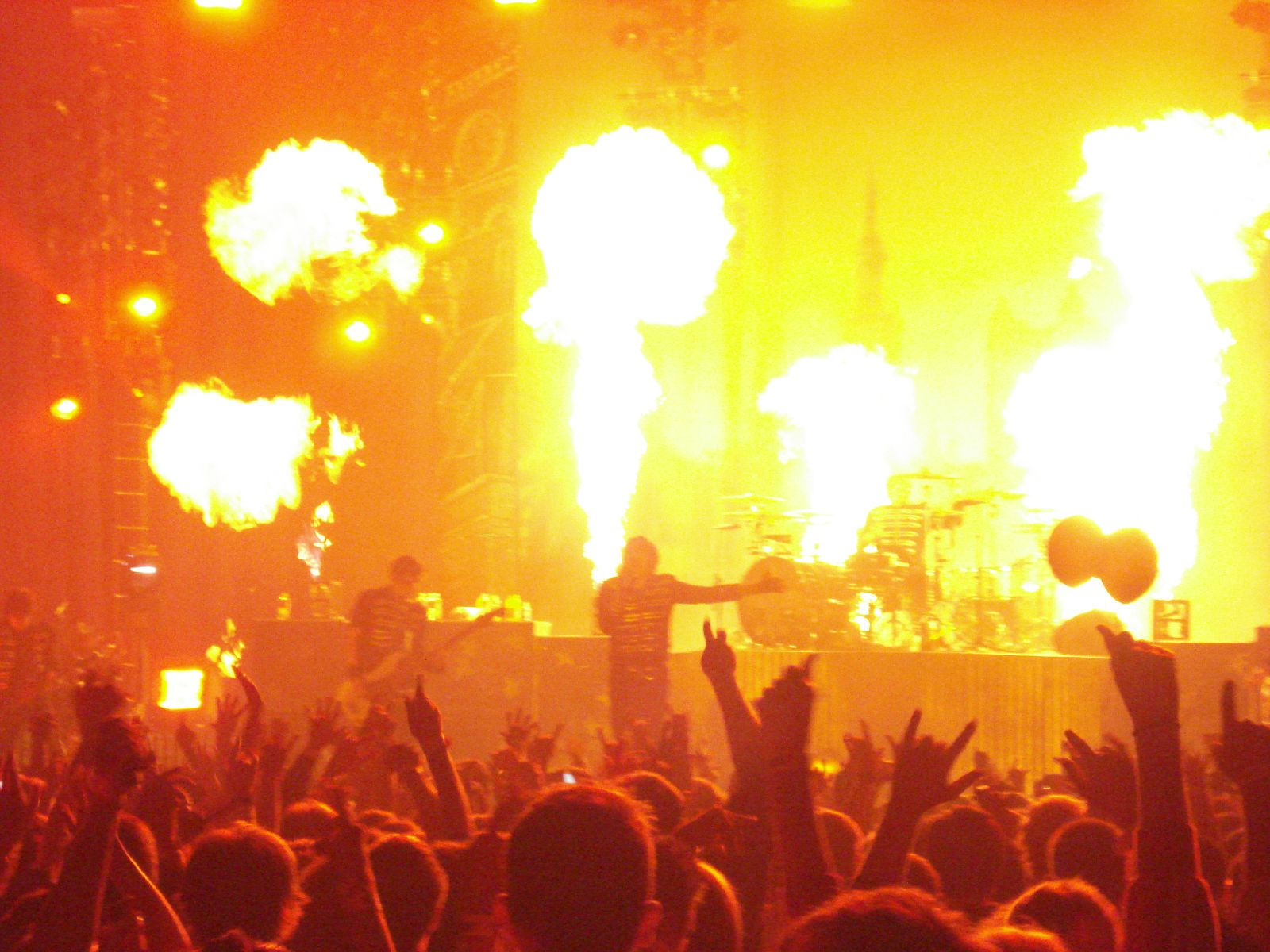
Most of the concerts on The Black Parade World Tour involved the use of pyrotechnics, especially during "Mama" and "Famous Last Words".

In 2008, the band released a live DVD/CD collection titled The Black Parade Is Dead!, which includes two concerts from October 2007, the final Black Parade concert in Mexico, and a small show at Maxwell's in New Jersey. The DVD/CD was meant to be released on June 24 in the United States and June 30 in the UK but was postponed to July 1 because of a technical fault with the Mexico concert. In 2009, an EP of B-sides from The Black Parade was released, titled The Black Parade: The B-Sides. The band then announced that they would be releasing "a collection of nine never-before-seen live videos, straight from the encore set of the Mexico City show from October 2007 during their Black Parade World Tour, titled ¡Venganza!. The release came on a bullet-shaped flash drive. It was released on April 10, 2009.

=== 2009–2011: Danger Days: The True Lives of the Fabulous Killjoys ===
In February 2009, My Chemical Romance released a new single titled "Desolation Row", a cover of the Bob Dylan song. It was recorded to feature as the end credit track for the 2009 film Watchmen, an adaptation of the graphic novel of the same name. While working on the then-upcoming fourth album, the band originally worked with producer Brendan O'Brien, who has worked with AC/DC, Mastodon, and Pearl Jam.

In an interview with NME, Gerard Way said the band's next record would be a rock album, saying, "I think [the next album] will definitely be stripped down. I think the band misses being a rock band." Way also commented that the next release would be less theatrical in scope, stating that "it's not going to be hiding behind a veil of fiction or uniforms and makeup anymore." In an interview with PopEater, Way also stated that the next album will be "full of hate". He also said, "Over the years that we've been hearing ourselves live and hearing us on records, we kind of prefer the live. There's more of a garage feel and more energy. I'd like to capture some of that, finally. That's the goal for the next one."

On July 31 and August 1, 2009, My Chemical Romance played two "secret" shows at The Roxy Theater in Los Angeles. The shows were the first concerts the band had played since Madison Square Garden in May 2008. The band also premiered several new songs said to be from their upcoming fourth album during the shows, one reportedly titled "Death Before Disco", a song that Way said he was particularly excited about. The song was since renamed "Party Poison" and was included on the new album. Way explained further in a Rolling Stone interview that "it's a completely different sound for the band — it's like an anti-party song that you can party to. I can't wait for people to hear it. It brings back, lyrically, some of that wonderful fiction from the first album."

Gerard Way also said in a November 2009 interview with Rock Sound that the fourth album would be their defining work. "A friend who heard the record recently said he now had no interest in listening to our older work anymore, that we had made all our old material redundant. I took it as a compliment, the next thing you should always make the last thing seem unimportant and I think that will happen when we finally release this album." On March 3, 2010, Iero announced on their official website that Bob Bryar had left the band, writing:

As of 4 weeks ago, My Chemical Romance and Bob Bryar parted ways. This was a painful decision for all of us to make and was not taken lightly. We wish him the best of luck in his future endeavors and expect you all to do the same.

— Frank Iero

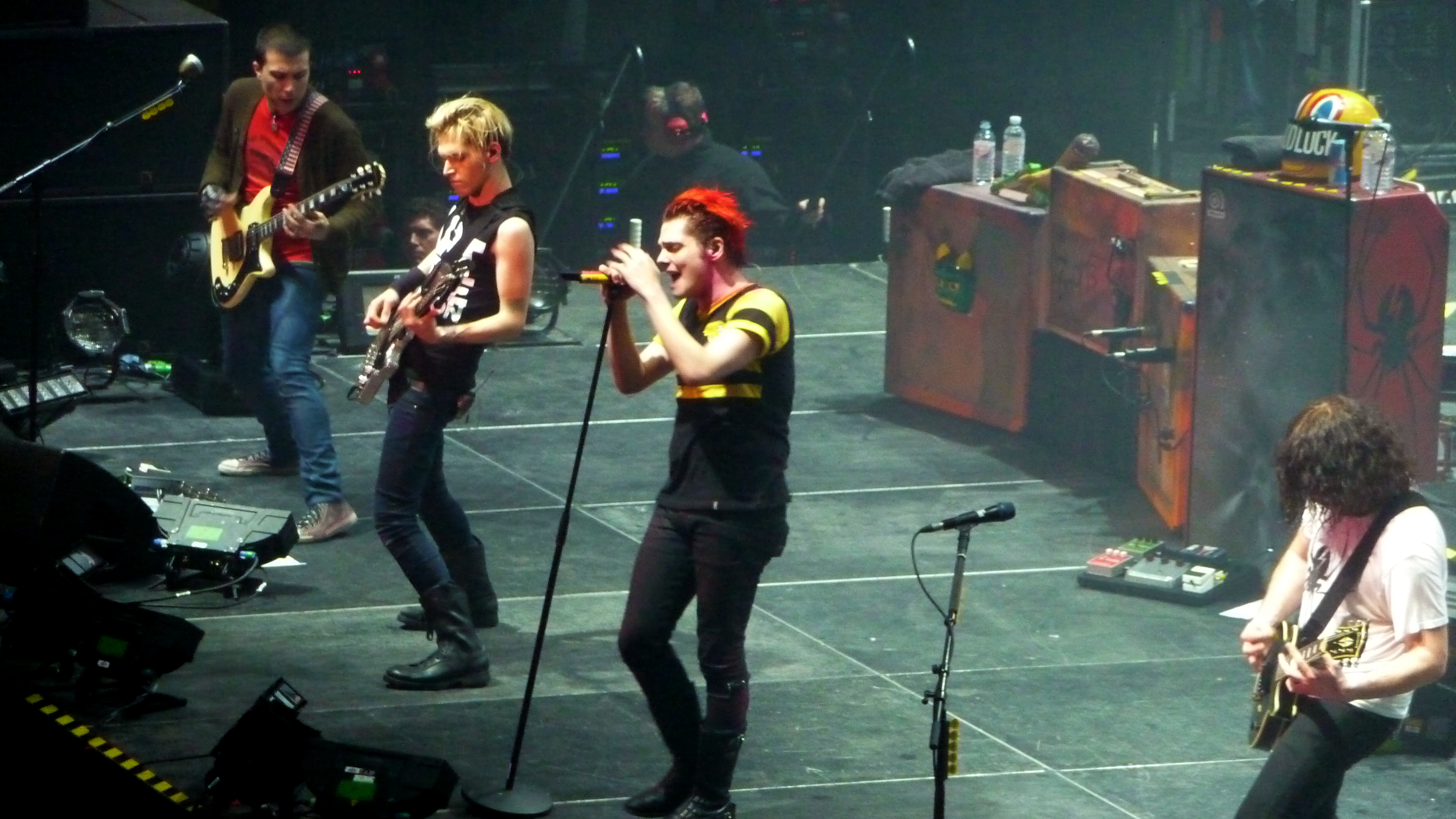
My Chemical Romance performing at the Nottingham Capital FM Arena in February 2011

Since Bryar's departure, My Chemical Romance has not had a full-time drummer. In a March 2010 MTV interview about the new album, Way explained, "There's no title yet ... I'm actually kind of excited about that. It's kind of 'anything goes' at this point, but I'm so happy with the songs." Though the band eventually decided on the title of their fourth album, it continued to go unannounced, with various rumors circulating and the band stating on their website that it would be revealed "all in due time".

During the 2010 San Diego Comic-Con, Way announced that the band had finished recording the fourth studio album. This was later confirmed by Iero on the band's website, announcing that the album was "done, finished, kaput, in the proverbial can, and being played loudly as we drive way too fast in our respective cars." In September, a trailer video was uploaded to My Chemical Romance's official YouTube page titled Art is a Weapon, which announced the title of the album: Danger Days: The True Lives of the Fabulous Killjoys. On September 22, 2010, the band premiered their song "Na Na Na (Na Na Na Na Na Na Na Na Na)" on Zane Lowe's BBC Radio 1 show and the Los Angeles-based radio station KROQ-FM. The song was officially released as a single on September 28. The album was released on November 22, 2010. The second single, "Sing", was released on November 3, 2010. Some of the other singles from the album include "Planetary (Go!)", "Bulletproof Heart", "The Only Hope for Me Is You", and "The Kids from Yesterday". "Sing", in particular, would go on to be covered by the cast of the American musical drama TV series Glee in February 2011 and later re-recorded as a charity single in response to the 2011 Tōhoku earthquake and tsunami. American broadcaster Glenn Beck labelled the song as propaganda, stating that it was an example of how "our whole culture right now is set up for you and the values that we grew up on to lose", and was an anthem telling people to "join [them]". Gerard Way responded to the accusation by saying, "I think the word Glenn Beck was looking for was 'subversion' not 'propaganda' [...] I don't know what it would be considered propaganda for—truth? Sentiment?".

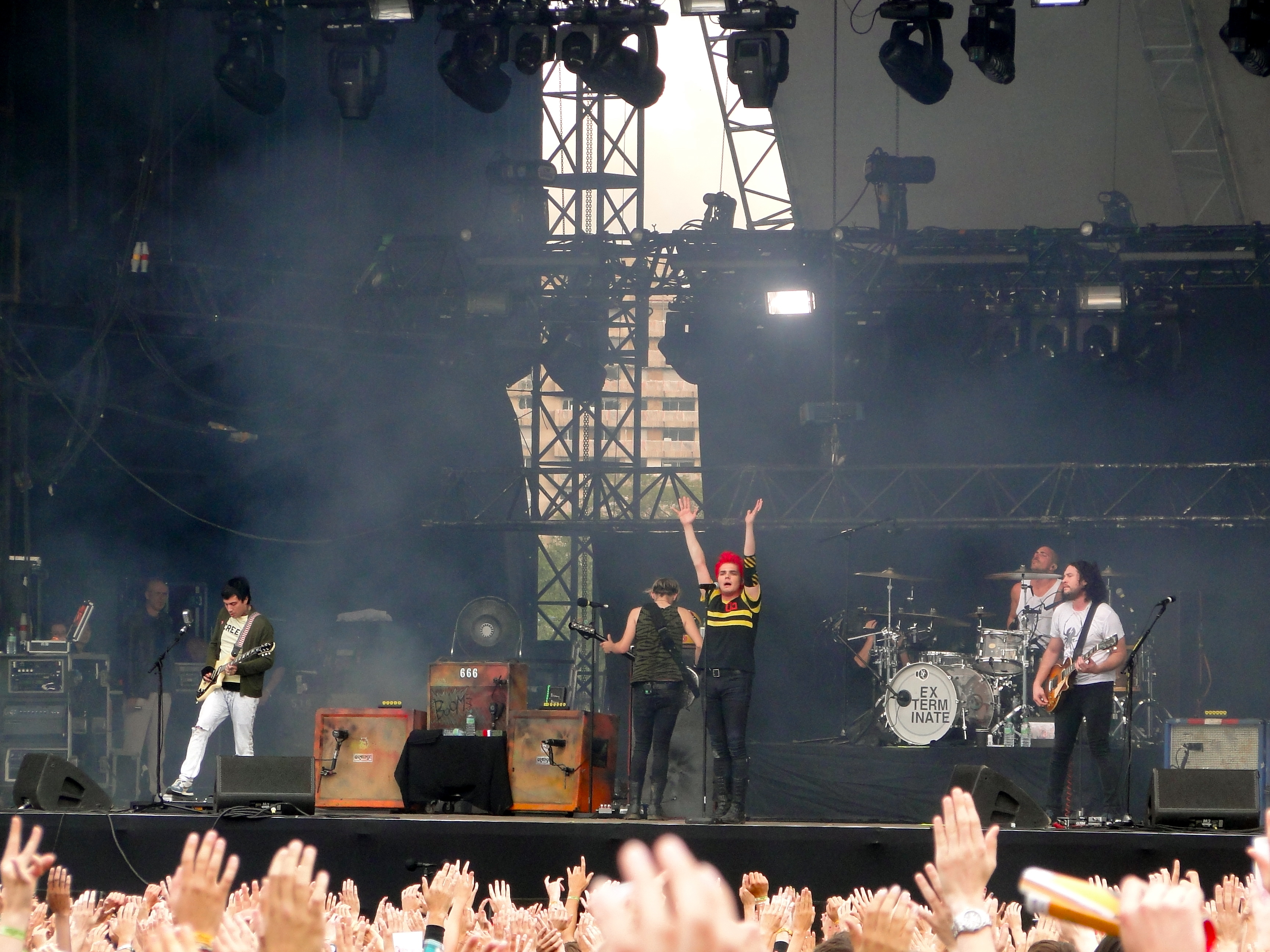
My Chemical Romance performing in 2011

Rock Sound had a preview of the album and gave a positive review, commenting that "the way they've used everything they learned on The Black Parade and tightened up in certain places feels natural and confident" and that it sees "the creativity of the band taking flight musically, graphically and literally". Michael Pedicone joined the band as a touring drummer late in 2010, replacing Bryar. During a performance at Wembley Arena on February 12, 2011, Way announced that the band would appear at a UK festival later that year. They also performed at Radio 1's Big Weekend in Carlisle, England, on May 15, 2011.

On September 2, 2011, Frank Iero posted a blog on the band's site stating, "The relationship between My Chemical Romance and Michael Pedicone is over" and explaining that Pedicone was sacked because "he was caught red-handed stealing from the band and confessed to police after our show last night in Auburn, Washington". He also mentioned his hope of getting a new drummer in time for their next show and avoiding having to cancel any performances in the process. On September 4, 2011, it was revealed through various sources that Jarrod Alexander would be the new touring drummer for the remainder of the Honda Civic tour.

=== 2011–2013: Scrapped fifth album, Conventional Weapons, and break-up ===
In an interview with Rolling Stone in October 2011, guitarist Frank Iero revealed that new music could be out "by summer". On December 18, 2011, the band appeared on Nick Jr. Channel's Yo Gabba Gabba!, and performed a song called "Every Snowflake Is Different (Just Like You)". This was part of a Christmas special for the show. The special includes other famous guest appearances such as Tony Hawk and Tori Spelling.

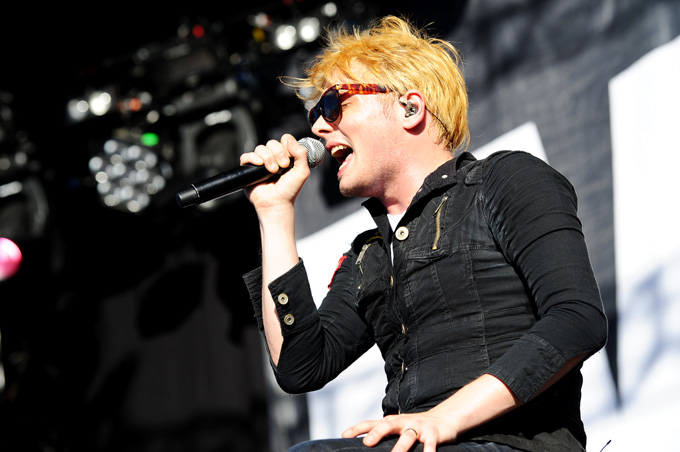
Gerard Way at the festival Big Day Out in February 2012 in Australia

My Chemical Romance began work on their fifth studio album in early 2012, with the working title of The Paper Kingdom. The band worked with engineer Doug McKean, who previously worked on The Black Parade and Danger Days: The True Lives of the Fabulous Killjoys. In September 2012, the band announced a new project titled Conventional Weapons. The project revolved around 10 unreleased songs that were recorded in 2009, prior to the making of Danger Days. The band released two songs each month for five months from the Conventional Weapons sessions, starting in October 2012 and finishing in February 2013. According to the October 2012 issue of Q Magazine, Frank Iero reported that early sessions for MCR's next album with the new drummer Jarrod Alexander were progressing well. "Jarrod is a rad guy and a fantastic player. It's been really fun making music with him these past few months", Iero commented.

On March 22, 2013, the band announced their break-up on their official website, issuing this statement:

Being in this band for the past 12 years has been a true blessing. We've gotten to go places we never knew we would. We've been able to see and experience things we never imagined possible. We've shared the stage with people we admire, people we look up to, and best of all, our friends. And now, like all great things, it has come time for it to end. Thanks for all of your support, and for being part of the adventure.

Gerard Way posted an extended tweet on his Twitter account two days after the website announcement, in which he confirmed the disbanding of the group but denied that altercations between band members were the reason for the split.

=== 2013–2017: May Death Never Stop You and post-breakup ===
On March 25, 2014, the band released a greatest hits collection, titled May Death Never Stop You, containing material spanning their entire career, as well as a single unreleased track, "Fake Your Death". "Fake Your Death" was made available digitally on February 17. It is the only song in MCR's discography to feature James Dewees playing keyboards.

Following the band's breakup, the members continued to pursue music. Lead vocalist Gerard Way announced his debut solo album Hesitant Alien with the release of an advance single, "Action Cat". Hesitant Alien was released on September 29, 2014, in the UK, and a day later in the US. Hesitant Alien was a moderate commercial success, topping the US Billboard Alternative Albums chart and reaching No. 16 on the US Billboard 200. Hesitant Alien also topped the "Ten Essential Albums Of 2014" list in Alternative Press.

Rhythm guitarist Frank Iero sporadically collaborated with My Chemical Romance keyboardist James Dewees, forming Death Spells and performing in Reggie and the Full Effect (alongside Ray Toro), releasing No Country for Old Musicians on November 19, 2013. Afterwards, he announced via his official website that he signed to Staple Records and would be releasing a full-length solo album titled Stomachaches under the moniker of "frnkiero andthe cellabration". The album featured former My Chemical Romance touring drummer Jarrod Alexander. Stomachaches was released worldwide on August 25, 2014.

Bassist Mikey Way formed Electric Century along with Sleep Station vocalist David Debiak in 2014 and released their debut single "I Lied" in February 2014. The duo announced their debut self-titled EP on March 10, 2015, and released it on Record Store Day on April 18, 2015. Lead guitarist Ray Toro released a song titled "Isn't That Something" on May 24, 2013. On January 1, 2015, he posted a new song titled "For the Lost and Brave" on his website, dedicating it to Leelah Alcorn, a transgender teen who committed suicide.

On July 20, 2016, the band posted on their official Twitter and Facebook pages a video with the piano intro from "Welcome to the Black Parade", ending with a cryptic date, "9/23/16". The video was also published on the band's YouTube channel with the video titled "MCRX". This led to numerous rumors and reports of the band's possible reunion until it was revealed to be a re-issue of The Black Parade with unreleased demos. The re-issue, titled The Black Parade/Living with Ghosts, includes 11 demos and live tracks. Two months before its release, an early version of "Welcome to the Black Parade", titled "The Five of Us Are Dying", was made available for streaming.

In a discussion of his work on the comic book Doom Patrol, Gerard Way told Billboard in 2017, "I wouldn't count (a reunion) out, but at the same time everybody's doing stuff in their lives now that they're really enjoying."

=== 2019–present: Reunion and upcoming album ===
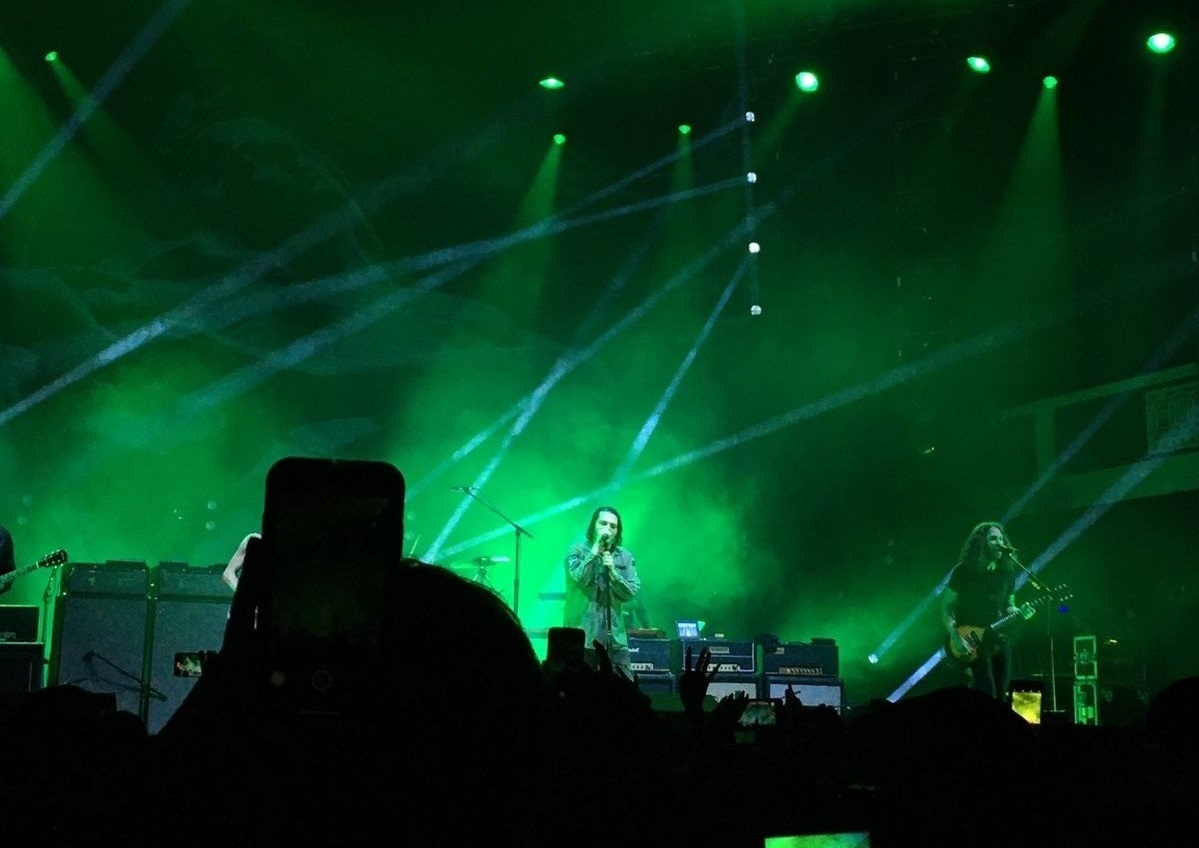
My Chemical Romance performing at their 2019 reunion show

My Chemical Romance regrouped in 2017 and began working together through a series of secret jam sessions and rehearsals. They announced their reunion on October 31, 2019, and scheduled a reunion show in Los Angeles on December 20. The show sold out almost immediately. Subsequent reunion shows were scheduled throughout Australia, Japan, and New Zealand for 2020. The Los Angeles show grossed $1,451,745, with an attendance of 5,113. The band later announced three concerts at Stadium MK (Milton Keynes, England) throughout June 2020, which sold out in a few minutes, and a North American tour that sold out in six hours. Due to the COVID-19 pandemic, all of these shows were postponed to 2021 and later rescheduled to 2022. The tour commenced on May 16, 2022, at the Eden Project and concluded on March 26, 2023, in Tokyo, Japan.

In 2021, Gerard Way stated that he was working on new music with McKean. On May 12, 2022, the band released "The Foundations of Decay", their first new song since reuniting. The song was used as an opener for several dates on their reunion tour. The band initially hoped to create more music after "The Foundations of Decay", including a fifth studio album. However, in July 2022, McKean died from an intracerebral hemorrhage; his death caused plans to make more music after "Foundations" to be canceled.

My Chemical Romance headlined the When We Were Young Festival in October 2024, where they performed The Black Parade in its entirety. Following the festival performance, the band announced the Long Live The Black Parade tour in November, where they would be playing the album in full. The tour is centered around a fictional dictatorship known as Draag, with a storyline in which the Black Parade alter-ego band is resurrected to appease the country's leader, known as the "Grand Immortal Dictator". The tour began on July 11, 2025, and concluded in 2026. As part of the tour, in July 2026, the band performed three shows at Wembley Stadium, and Pollstar described the performances as the largest United Kingdom shows of the band's career. The band was also one of the headlining acts for the 2026 iteration of the Louder Than Life festival. Bryar died in November 2024. During the band's performance in Bryar's native Chicago in August 2025, they projected an image of him on-screen as a tribute.

From 2025 to 2026, My Chemical Romance released deluxe editions of three of their existing albums. A deluxe edition of Revenge, remixed by Rich Costey, was released on the album's 21st anniversary on June 6, 2025. A deluxe edition of Danger Days followed on July 10, 2026, featuring a remastered version of the album and nine bonus tracks. The Black Parade received similar treatment, with a deluxe edition released on October 23, 2026, for its 20th anniversary. The reissue of The Black Parade propelled it to number one on the Billboard 200 and the UK Albums chart, making it My Chemical Romance's first number one album in both the United States and the United Kingdom. It also set the record for the longest wait between an album's Billboard 200 debut and reaching number one.

On October 30, 2026, Gerard Way announced during a concert at the Hollywood Bowl that the band plan to record their fifth studio album in 2027, and will return to touring in 2028 after the album is made. The announcement followed a previous remark Way made on September 12 at their performance in San Antonio, where he said that the band always wanted to make a fifth studio album and that they felt fans deserved it, although they were not sure when it would be made.

== Musical style and influences ==
=== Style and classification ===
My Chemical Romance are primarily known for their "goth-tinged" aesthetic, theatrical vocals, and "introspective, confessional lyrics". The band's music has mostly been categorized as alternative rock, emo, pop-punk, post-hardcore, punk rock, and hard rock. (Note: Musical styles: "alternative rock"; "emo"; "pop punk"; "post-hardcore"; "punk rock"; "hard rock") The band has also released songs that have been described as emo pop, hardcore punk, gothic rock, pop rock, arena rock, glam rock, progressive rock, heavy metal, pop, screamo, and garage punk. (Note: Additional musical styles: "emo pop"; "hardcore punk"; "gothic rock"; "pop rock"; "arena rock"; "glam rock"; "progressive rock"; "heavy metal"; "pop"; "screamo"; "garage punk") Gerard Way has publicly rejected the term "emo", describing the genre as "fucking garbage" (although he has reportedly also described the band's style as "What-else-ya-got-emo").

The band's debut album I Brought You My Bullets, You Brought Me Your Love exhibits a raw sound featuring fast guitar riffs, highly energetic vocals, and occasional screaming. The album has been compared to the works of Thursday and has been described as emo, post-hardcore, screamo, punk rock, gothic rock, pop-punk, and garage punk, with influences from hardcore punk and heavy metal. The band's following album, Three Cheers for Sweet Revenge, features "hyper" instrumentation and "furious immediacy" and was described as alternative rock, emo, pop-punk, post-hardcore, punk rock, and pop rock.

The band's third album, The Black Parade, has been called an "old-fashioned concept album", featuring "pummeling riffs and soaring guitar solos". It has been described as alternative rock, emo, pop-punk, progressive rock, post-hardcore, punk rock, and hard rock, with influences from 1970s classic rock, glam rock, pop, and gothic rock. The band's fourth album, Danger Days: The True Lives of the Fabulous Killjoys, integrated elements of power pop, psychedelic rock, proto-punk, pop rock, and electronic rock into their sound.

=== Influences ===
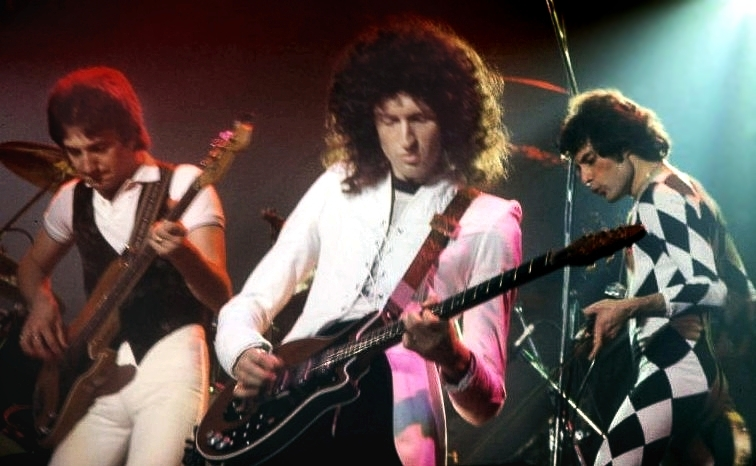
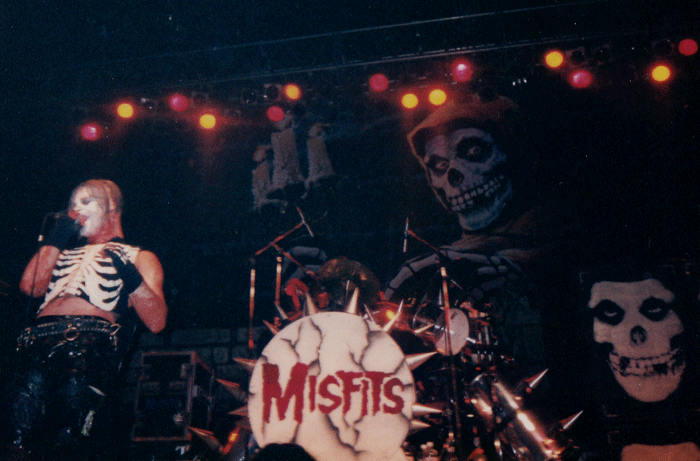
My Chemical Romance have cited Queen (top) and the Misfits (bottom) as key influences.

Gerard Way said to Rolling Stone, "we love bands like Queen, where it's huge and majestic, but also bands like Black Flag and the Misfits, who would go absolutely crazy." Additionally, Way has stated that the band is heavily influenced by Ink & Dagger, Circle Jerks, Stiffs, Inc., the Damned, Iron Maiden, At the Gates, Descendents, Pantera, Van Halen, the Cure, Joy Division, Bauhaus, Siouxsie and the Banshees, the Smiths and Morrissey. The Smashing Pumpkins also impacted the band's trajectory, with Way stating that My Chemical Romance has patterned their career after the Pumpkins'. Gerard Way has cited the Dresden Dolls, Queen and the film Cabaret (1972) as an influence upon the band's cabaret songs such as "You Know What They Do to Guys Like Us In Prison" and "Blood".

Toro cited the influence of Green Day's American Idiot upon The Black Parade. Frank Iero's guitar work draws from Sonic Youth guitarist Thurston Moore and Jack White, while Ray Toro cites Megadeth, Metallica, Pantera, and Iron Maiden as influences. In a 2021 interview with Alternative Press, Iero cited the works of Wesley Eisold, particularly American Nightmare and Cold Cave, as points of influence.

In a 2023 interview, Mikey Way stated that he and his brother learnt to play music by emulating the Smashing Pumpkins and Weezer, but performing in the New Jersey hardcore scene made them write more aggressive music to fit in with the Get Up Kids and American Nightmare. In a 2006 interview, he called the New Jersey venue the Pipeline "a big part of our musical upbringing", naming performances there by AFI, the Bouncing Souls, Madball, and Nine Inch Nails as impactful. The local band to have the most significant impact on My Chemical Romance's sound was Thursday. In a 2015 interview, Gerard Way stated, "Thursday started as a very emotional band and became a very interesting band, and that was one of my favourite things about their evolution. But for nostalgic reasons, it was always about 'Cross Out The Eyes.' If people want to talk about 'emo,' that is the song. That is emotional hardcore."

In a 2007 issue of Kerrang!, when asked to list the songs that influenced the band's music the most, they listed Taking Back Sunday's "MakeDamnSure", Say Anything's "Alive with the Glory of Love", Thursday's "Understanding in a Car Crash", Kill Hannah's "Lips like Morphine", Black Flag's "Nervous Breakdown", the Misfit's "Dust to Dust", the Bled's "You Know Whose Seatbelt", Killswitch Engage's "Fixation of Darkness", Idlewild's "Love Steals Us from Loneliness", Alkaline Trio's "Radio", Thrice's "Red Sky", Denali's "Surface", Soilwork's "Bastard Chain" and Helloween's "Twilight of the Gods". My Chemical Romance's other influences include the Stooges, Ramones, Sex Pistols, the Clash, Minor Threat, Nirvana, and Operation Ivy. They also have noted that their lives, childhoods, books they have read, and movies they have seen have influenced their music.

== Legacy and cultural impact ==
=== Music and popular culture ===
Music journalist Em Casalena of American Songwriter stated that "Any conversation about bands that defined the emo sound will likely at least mention My Chemical Romance." According to Rolling Stone, the band played "somewhat of an anomaly in New Jersey's then-burgeoning pop-punk and emo scene", before achieving their breakthrough with an "instant emo classic", Three Cheers for Sweet Revenge. In 2022, The Guardian wrote that during the height of their career they were "unlikely superstars, misfits who inadvertently infiltrated the mainstream" but upon their reunion tour, the band would "return to a pop cultural landscape they helped to define". The New York Times's Christopher R. Weingarten has noted that The Black Parade inspired a number of 2010s musicians in different genres, including Twenty One Pilots, Crown the Empire, Famous Last Words, Halsey, Fun, Billie Eilish, and Post Malone, and even influenced the sound of movie musicals like Frozen II. In 2016, Nylon wrote that the record "took the idea of a concept album and exploited it for the digital age", while being musically a rock opera "as ambitious as any post-Queen rock opera could be". The staff of Consequence ranked the band at number 20 on their list of "The 100 Best Pop Punk Bands" in 2019.

In 2020, Kerrang! deemed the band "the rock superstars of the 21st century" while stating that "no other band has had such a musical or cultural impact over recent years." The magazine also noted their influence in "the current music scene" of alternative rock. Vice named My Chemical Romance the "artist of the decade", with writer Hannah Ewens commenting that they "influenced rock throughout the 2010s—even though they were inactive for most of the decade". In Paste magazine, Eli Enis wrote that "It's pretty much accepted canon at this point that My Chemical Romance are one of the most significant rock bands this side of the millennium." James McMahon of The Independent stated that Gerard Way "set a blueprint for emo's image of pale face, raven-black hair and perhaps a red tie, for almost 20 years". Writing on the band's influence, Entertainment Weekly's Kyle Anderson stated that they "offered up spiritual solutions to real problems, and they did it with huge riffs and big theatrical stage shows, with rarely a hint of irony or detachment. [...] it's unlikely there will ever be a band quite like them again."

The band was considered one of the "most loved and hated rock groups" of the late 2000s, according to Noah Buchan of the Taipei Times. Speaking on the band's reception and criticism during the early 2000s, NPR Music wrote that "at a moment when mannered indie-pop and roughshod garage-rock were infiltrating the mainstream, [the band] was earnest, dramatic and unapologetically massive, in a way that made it conspicuously uncool", and deemed The Black Parade a "defining album" for a generation of pop-punk fans. Conversely, Tom Reardon of Phoenix New Times was more skeptical about the band's releases being regarded as classics in the punk genre: "Cringe-worthy music seems to rule the popular consensus of what is punk these days. It makes me a tad ill to think that the aforementioned bands are going to be what the current generation of 20-somethings looks back on as classic punk albums. Whiny emo crap is not punk rock and never has been, but then again, who am I to make this distinction?"

=== LGBT community ===
In Archer, Vince Ruston commented on the band's popularity in the queer and LGBT communities: "My Chemical Romance wanted to speak to and raise up every person who had ever felt outcast, downtrodden, or alienated. Queer teens were a huge part of that demographic". Similarly, Michelle Hyun Kim described Gerard Way as a "queer icon" in Them, and that "after the band announced their reunion on Halloween 2019, I saw tweets from LGBTQ+ folks around the world claiming, in some way or another, that MCR either served as a queer awakening or fostered their queerness." The band has long been supportive of LGBT rights and embraced their LGBT fandom.

== Headlining concert tours ==
- Three Cheers for Sweet Revenge Tour (2005)
- The Black Parade World Tour (2007–2008)
- The World Contamination Tour (2010–2012)
- 10th Annual Honda Civic Tour (with Blink-182) (2011)
- Reunion Tour (2019, 2022–2023)
- Long Live The Black Parade (2025–2026)

== Band members ==
Current members

- Gerard Way – lead vocals (2001–2013, 2019–present), synthesizers (2022–present)
- Ray Toro – lead guitar, backing vocals (2001–2013, 2019–present)
- Mikey Way – bass (2001–2013, 2019–present), backing vocals (2010)
- Frank Iero – rhythm guitar, backing vocals (2002–2013, 2019–present)

Current touring musicians

- Tucker Rule – percussion (2007–2008, 2025–present); drums (2007–2008; substitute for Bob Bryar)
- Jarrod Alexander – drums, percussion (2011–2013, 2019–present)
- Jamie Muhoberac – keyboards, synthesizers, piano (2019–present, session 2006, 2009-2010), backing vocals (2006)
- Kayleigh Goldsworthy – violin (2025–present)
- Clarice Jensen – cello (2025–present)

Former members

- Matt Pelissier – drums, percussion (2001–2004)
- Bob Bryar – drums, percussion (2004–2010; died 2024)
- James Dewees – keyboards, synthesizer, percussion, backing vocals (2012–2013; touring 2007–2012)

Former touring musicians

- Pete Parada – drums, percussion (2007; substitute for Bob Bryar)
- Matt Cortez – rhythm guitar (2007–2008; substitute for Frank Iero), bass guitar (2007; substitute for Mikey Way)
- Todd Price – rhythm guitar (2008; substitute for Frank Iero)
- Michael Pedicone – drums, percussion (2010–2011)

Timeline

== Discography ==
Studio albums

- I Brought You My Bullets, You Brought Me Your Love (2002)
- Three Cheers for Sweet Revenge (2004)
- The Black Parade (2006)
- Danger Days: The True Lives of the Fabulous Killjoys (2010)

== See also ==
- List of artists who reached number one on the U.S. alternative rock chart
- List of awards and nominations received by My Chemical Romance
