= Powerman 5000 discography =

This is the discography for Powerman 5000, an American rock band formed in 1991.

== Studio albums ==
Year	Album details	Peak chart positions			Sales	Certifications (sales thresholds)
Year	Album details	US	US Ind.	NZL	Sales	Certifications (sales thresholds)
1995	The Blood-Splat Rating System: Released: December 1, 1995; Label: Conscience; Format: CD	—	—	—		
1997	Mega!! Kung Fu Radio: Released: February 25, 1997; Label: DreamWorks (50107); Format: CD; Info: Re-Issue with 3 bonus and 1 hidden track	—	—	—		
1999	Tonight the Stars Revolt!: Released: July 20, 1999; Label: DreamWorks (50107); Format: CD, CS	29	—	8	US: 1,000,000+	RIAA: Platinum; RMNZ: Platinum
2001	Anyone for Doomsday?: Released: August 28, 2001; Label: DreamWorks (450296); Format: CD, DI	—	—	—		
2003	Transform: Released: May 20, 2003; Label: DreamWorks (450433); Format: CD	27	—	—		
2006	Destroy What You Enjoy: Released: August 1, 2006; Label: DRT (444); Format: CD	120	5	—		
2009	Somewhere on the Other Side of Nowhere: Released: October 6, 2009; Label: Mighty Loud (9005); Format: CD	—	—	—		
2011	Copies Clones & Replicants: Released: September 9, 2011; Label: Cleopatra Records; Format: CD, Vinyl	—	—	—		
2014	Builders of the Future: Released: May 23, 2014; Label: UMe; Format: CD, Hi-Res Download	63	—	—		
2017	New Wave: Released: October 27, 2017; Label: Pavement Entertainment; Format: CD, Hi-Res Download	—	—	—		
2020	The Noble Rot: Released: August 28, 2020; Label: Cleopatra; Format: CD, Vinyl, Download	—	—	—		
2024	Abandon Ship: Released: May 10, 2024; Label: Cleopatra; Format: CD, Vinyl, Hi-res Download	—	—	—		
"—" denotes a release that did not chart.

== Compilation albums ==
Year	Album details
2004	The Good, the Bad and the Ugly, Vol. 1: Rare & Previously Unreleased '91–'96: Released: October 24, 2004; Label: Megatronic (5001); Format: CD

== Extended plays ==
Year	Album details
1993	A Private Little War: Released: 1993; Label: Format: CS
1994	True Force: Released: March 25, 1994; Label: Curve of the Earth (16); Format: CD
2005	Korea Tour EP: Released: 2005; Label: Megatronic; Format: CD

== Singles ==
Year	Title	Peak chart positions		Album
Year	Title	US Alt.	US Main.	Album
1997	"Tokyo Vigilante #1"	—	—	Mega!! Kung Fu Radio
1998	"Organizized"	—	—	Mega!! Kung Fu Radio
1999	"When Worlds Collide"	18	16	Tonight the Stars Revolt!
1999	"Nobody's Real"	23	18	Tonight the Stars Revolt!
2000	"Supernova Goes Pop"	—	—	Tonight the Stars Revolt!
2000	"Ultra Mega"	—	38	Dracula 2000 soundtrack
2000	"Get On, Get Off"	—	—	Scream 3 soundtrack
2001	"Bombshell"	—	26	Anyone for Doomsday?
2001	"Relax"	—	—	Zoolander soundtrack
2003	"Free"	38	10	Transform
2003	"Action"	—	27	Transform
2006	"Wild World"	—	—	Destroy What You Enjoy
2009	"Super Villain"	—	—	Somewhere on the Other Side of Nowhere
2009	"V Is for Vampire"	—	—	Somewhere on the Other Side of Nowhere
2010	"Show Me What You've Got"	—	—	Somewhere on the Other Side of Nowhere
2010	"Time Bomb, Baby"	—	—	Somewhere on the Other Side of Nowhere
2014	"How to Be a Human"	—	23	Builders of the Future
2017	"Sid Vicious in a Dress"	—	38	New Wave
2017	"Cult Leader"	—	—	New Wave
2020	"Black Lipstick"	—	—	The Noble Rot
2020	"Brave New World"	—	—	The Noble Rot
2020	"When Worlds Collide (Re-Recorded)"	—	—	The Noble Rot
2024	"1999"	—	—	Abandon Ship
2024	"Dancing Like We're Dead"	—	—	Abandon Ship
2024	"Bombshell (Re-Recorded)"	—	—	Abandon Ship
"—" denotes a release that did not chart.

== Video albums ==
Year	Album details
2001	Backstage and Beyond the Infinite: Released: February 27, 2001; Label: DreamWorks (53253); Format: VHS, DVD

== Music videos ==
Year	Title	Director	Album
1997	"Tokyo Vigilante #1"	Rob Zombie	Mega!! Kung Fu Radio
1998	"Organizized"	Joel Newman / Spider One	Mega!! Kung Fu Radio
1999	"When Worlds Collide"	David Meyers	Tonight The Stars Revolt!
1999	"Nobody's Real"	David Meyers / Spider One	Tonight The Stars Revolt!
2000	"Supernova Goes Pop"	Spider One	Tonight The Stars Revolt!
2000	"They Know Who You Are"	N/A	Tonight The Stars Revolt!
2001	"Bombshell"	The Brothers Strause	Anyone for Doomsday?
2001	"Relax"	Marc Klasfeld	Zoolander soundtrack
2003	"Free"	N/A	Transform
2003	"Action"	Vem & Tony / Spider One	Transform
2006	"Wild World"	Jeff Stewart	Destroy What You Enjoy
2009	"Super Villain"	Robert Hall	Somewhere on the Other Side of Nowhere
2014	"How to Be a Human"	OneFox Productions	Builders of the Future
2015	"Invade Destroy Repeat"	Kevin Garcia	Builders of the Future
2017	"Sid Vicious in a Dress"	N/A	New Wave
2017	"David Fucking Bowie"	OneFox Productions	New Wave
2017	"Cult Leader"	Spider One	New Wave
2018	"Footsteps and Voices"	Spider One	New Wave
2020	"Black Lipstick"	Spider One	The Noble Rot
2020	"Brave New World"	OneFox Productions	The Noble Rot
2020	"Strange People Doing Strange Things"	Spider One	The Noble Rot

== Soundtrack contributions ==
Track	Medium	Soundtrack	Year
"Strike the Match"	TV series	Beverly Hills, 90210	1996
"Earth Vs. Me"	film	Excess Baggage	1997
"Organizized"	film	Dead Man on Campus	1998
"Solid"	film	New Girl	1998
"The Son of X-51" (Remix)	film	Bride of Chucky	1998
"Nobody's Real"	film	End of Days	1999
"Supernova Goes Pop"	film	Universal Soldier: The Return	1999
"Standing 8"	TV series	Celebrity Deathmatch	1999
"Ultra Mega"	film	Dracula 2000	2000
"When Worlds Collide"	film	Little Nicky	2000
"Get On, Get Off"	film	Scream 3	2000
"Good Times Roll"	—	Jailbait	2000
"The End Is Over"	film	Titan A.E.	2000
"When Worlds Collide"	video game	Tony Hawk's Pro Skater 2	2000
"Bombshell"	film	Evolution	2001
"Bombshell"	video game	Shaun Palmer's Pro Snowboarder	2001
"Supernova Goes Pop"	video game	Gran Turismo 3: A-Spec	2001
"Bombshell"	TV series	WWE Tough Enough	2001
"Relax"	film	Zoolander	2001
"Danger Is Go! (Remix)"	video game	Frequency	2001
"Danger Is Go!"	film	Extreme Ops	2002
"Bombshell"	video game	NHL Hitz 2003	2002
"Bombshell"	video game	SX Superstar	2003
"Bombshell"	film	Freddy vs. Jason	2003
"Action"	video game	NASCAR Thunder 2004	2003
"Transform"	video game	NHL Hitz Pro	2003
"When Worlds Collide"; "Riot Time"; "Last Night on Earth"; "The Way It Is"; "Bombshell"	video game	WWE Smackdown! vs. Raw	2004
"Last Night on Earth"; "Riot Time"; "That's the Way It Is"	video game	WWE WrestleMania 21	2005
"Heroes and Villains"	video game	MX vs. ATV Unleashed	2005
"That's the Way It Is"	film	Supercross	2005
"The Way It Is"; "Heroes And Villains"; "The Last Night on Earth"	film	Return of the Living Dead: Necropolis	2005
"Where We Belong Tonight"; "Give Me Something I Need"; "Almost Dead"	film	Return of the Living Dead: Rave to the Grave	2005
"Almost Dead"	video game	Shadow the Hedgehog	2005
"Bombshell"	video game	SCORE International Baja 1000	2008
"Do Your Thing"; "Show Me What You've Got"; "Time Bomb"; "Super Villain"; "V Is for Vampire"; "Get Your Bones"	video game	Rock Band 3	2010
"When Worlds Collide"	video game	Tony Hawk's Pro Skater HD	2012
"When Worlds Collide"	video game	Rocksmith 2014	2014
"When Worlds Collide"	video game	Tony Hawk's Pro Skater 1 + 2	2020
"Black Lipstick"	film	Terrifier 2	2022
"When Worlds Collide"	video game	WWE 2K26	2026
