= DreamWorks Records discography =

This is a list of albums released by the now-defunct record label DreamWorks Records, which include studio albums and soundtrack albums.

== DreamWorks Records ==
Release date	Artist	Album	Peak chart positions	RIAA certifications
May 14, 1996	George Michael	Older	US: #6	RIAA: Platinum; First release by DreamWorks Records
August 13, 1996	Eels	Beautiful Freak	US: #114	
August 27, 1996	Jonathan Larson	Rent (Original Broadway Cast Recording)	US: #19	
February 25, 1997	Powerman 5000	Mega!! Kung-Fu Radio	US: #120	
March 11, 1997	Morphine	Like Swimming	US: #67	
March 25, 1997	Rollins Band	Come In and Burn	US: #89	
April 8, 1997	Chris Rock	Roll with the New	US: #93	
April 29, 1997	Kool Keith (as Dr. Octagon)	Dr. Octagonecologyst		
September 9, 1997	Forest for the Trees	Forest for the Trees	US: #190	
September 9, 1997	Hans Zimmer	The Peacemaker: Original Motion Picture Soundtrack		
September 9, 1997	Kim Fox	Moon Hut		
September 9, 1997	Subcircus	Carousel		
October 7, 1997	Jonathan Fire*Eater	Wolf Songs for Lambs		
December 9, 1997	John Williams	Amistad: Original Motion Picture Soundtrack		
January 26, 1998	Propellerheads	Decksandrumsandrockandroll	US: #110	
March 3, 1998	P.A.	Straight No Chase		
May 19, 1998	Rufus Wainwright	Rufus Wainwright		
July 7, 1998	Various Artists	Small Soldiers: Music from the Motion Picture		
July 21, 1998	John Williams	Saving Private Ryan		
August 4, 1998	Various Artists	Dead Man on Campus: Music from the Motion Picture		
August 25, 1998	Elliott Smith	XO	US: #104	
September 8, 1998	Various Artists	Songs of the Witchblade: A Soundtrack to the Comic Books		
September 22, 1998	Henry Rollins	Think Tank		
September 29, 1998	Various Artists	A Night at the Roxbury: Music from the Motion Picture		
November 17, 1998	Various Artists	The Prince of Egypt: Music from the Original Motion Picture Soundtrack		
November 17, 1998	Various Artists	The Prince of Egypt (Inspirational)		
October 1998	Self	Feels Like Breakin' Shit		
October 10, 1998	Eels	Electro-Shock Blues		
March 16, 1999	Various Artists	Forces of Nature: Music from the Original Motion Picture Soundtrack		
April 6, 1999	Buckcherry	Buckcherry	US: #74	RIAA: Gold
May 11, 1999	Ash	Nu-Clear Sounds		
May 25, 1999	Dave Hollister	Ghetto Hymns	US: #34	RIAA: Gold
June 1, 1999	Randy Newman	Bad Love	US: #194	
July 13, 1999	Self	Breakfast with Girls		
July 20, 1999	Powerman 5000	Tonight the Stars Revolt!	US: #29	RIAA: Platinum
July 23, 1999	Chris Rock	Bigger & Blacker	US: #44	
September 7, 1999	Blinker the Star	August Everywhere		
September 7, 1999	Jonathan Larson	The Best of Rent: Highlights from the Original Cast Album		
September 28, 1999	Long Beach Dub Allstars	Right Back	US: #67	
September 28, 1999	Solé	Skin Deep	US: #127	
October 5, 1999	Various Artists	American Beauty: Music from the Original Motion Picture Soundtrack		
January 11, 2000	Thomas Newman	American Beauty: Original Motion Picture Score		
February 1, 2000	Morphine	The Night	US: #137	
February 29, 2000	Rollins Band	Get Some Go Again	US: #180	
March 14, 2000	Cupcakes	Cupcakes		
March 14, 2000	Eels	Daisies of the Galaxy		
March 14, 2000	Elton John	The Road to El Dorado		
March 21, 2000	N-Toon	Toon Time		
March 21, 2000	Tamar Braxton	Tamar	US: #127	
April 18, 2000	Elliott Smith	Figure 8	US: #99	
April 25, 2000	Papa Roach	Infest	US: #5	RIAA: 3× Platinum
May 16, 2000	Erick Sermon	Erick Onasis	US: #53	
May 23, 2000	Various Artists	Road Trip: Music from the Motion Picture		
June 20, 2000	Deadly Venoms	Pretty Thugs		
July 18, 2000	Kina	Kina		
September 12, 2000	Various Artists	Almost Famous: Music from the Motion Picture		
September 26, 2000	Randy Newman	Meet the Parents: Original Motion Picture Soundtrack		
October 10, 2000	Various Artists	The Ladies Man: Music from the Motion Picture		
October 24, 2000	Nelly Furtado	Whoa, Nelly!	US: #24	RIAA: 2× Platinum
October 31, 2000	Lifehouse	No Name Face	US: #6	RIAA: 2× Platinum
November 21, 2000	Dave Hollister	Chicago '85... The Movie	US: #49	RIAA: Gold
March 6, 2001	Alien Ant Farm	Anthology	US: #11	RIAA: Platinum
March 27, 2001	Buckcherry	Time Bomb	US: #64	
April 17, 2001	Creeper Lagoon	Take Back the Universe and Give Me Yesterday		
April 24, 2001	John Fogerty	Eye of the Zombie		
May 14, 2001	Various Artists	Shrek: Music from the Original Motion Picture		
May 15, 2001	Ours	Distorted Lullabies		
May 29, 2001	Canela	Canela		
June 5, 2001	Rufus Wainwright	Poses	US: #117	
July 24, 2001	Jimmy Eat World	Bleed American	US: #31	RIAA: Platinum
August 7, 2001	The Isley Brothers	Eternal	US: #3	RIAA: 2× Platinum
August 28, 2001	Powerman 5000	Anyone for Doomsday?		
September 11, 2001	Halfcocked	The Last Star		
September 11, 2001	Long Beach Dub Allstars	Wonders of the World	US: #59	
September 18, 2001	The K.G.B.	The K.G.B.		
September 18, 2001	Various Artists	WWF Tough Enough		
October 2, 2001	Pressure 4-5	Burning the Process	US: #177	
January 29, 2002	Citizen Cope	Citizen Cope		
February 12, 2002	Josh Clayton-Felt	Spirit Touches Ground		
March 12, 2002	Eels	Souljacker		
April 2, 2002	The Apex Theory	Topsy-Turvy	US: #157	
May 14, 2002	Deadsy	Commencement	US: #100	
June 11, 2002	Hem	Rabbit Songs		
June 18, 2002	John Williams	Minority Report: Original Motion Picture Score		
June 18, 2002	Papa Roach	Lovehatetragedy	US: #2	RIAA: Gold
August 13, 2002	Sparta	Wiretap Scars	US: #71	
August 27, 2002	A.i.	Artificial Intelligence		
August 27, 2002	Jimmy Fallon	The Bathroom Wall	US: #47	
September 17, 2002	Lifehouse	Stanley Climbfall	US: #7	
October 1, 2002	Floetry	Floetic	US: #19	RIAA: Gold
October 8, 2002	Loudermilk	The Red Record		
November 5, 2002	Ours	Precious	US: #187	
December 10, 2002	John Williams	Catch Me If You Can		
December 10, 2002	Swizz Beatz	Swizz Beatz Presents G.H.E.T.T.O. Stories	US: #50	
January 17, 2003	The All-American Rejects	The All-American Rejects	US: #25	RIAA: Platinum
January 28, 2003	Various Artists	Biker Boyz: Music from the Motion Picture		
March 11, 2003	AFI	Sing the Sorrow	US: #5	RIAA: Platinum
March 11, 2003	Blackstreet	Level II	US: #14	
March 18, 2003	Boomkat	Boomkatalog.One	US: #88	
May 6, 2003	Eastmountainsouth	Eastmountainsouth		
May 6, 2003	The Isley Brothers	Body Kiss	US: #1	RIAA: Gold
May 20, 2003	Powerman 5000	Transform	US: #27	
June 3, 2003	Eels	Shootenanny!	US: #145	
July 29, 2003	JS	Ice Cream	US: #33	
July 29, 2003	Jessy Moss	Street Knuckles		
August 19, 2003	Alien Ant Farm	Truant	US: #42	
September 16, 2003	Saves the Day	In Reverie	US: #27	
September 23, 2003	Rufus Wainwright	Want One	US: #60	
September 30, 2003	Maria	My Soul		
November 11, 2003	Dave Hollister	Real Talk	US: #42	
November 25, 2003	Nelly Furtado	Folklore	US: #38	RIAA: Gold
May 11, 2004	Various Artists	Shrek 2: Motion Picture Soundtrack		
August 17, 2004	Living Things	Black Skies in Broad Daylight		
September 21, 2004	John Fogerty	Deja Vu (All Over Again)	US: #23	
September 21, 2004	Various Artists	Shark Tale: Motion Picture Soundtrack		
November 16, 2004	Rufus Wainwright	Want Two	US: #103	

== DreamWorks Nashville ==
Release date	Artist	Album	Peak chart positions	RIAA certifications
April 21, 1998	Randy Travis	You and You Alone	US: #49	
November 3, 1998	Linda Davis	I'm Yours		
November 17, 1998	Various Artists	The Prince of Egypt (Nashville)		
March 23, 1999	Jessica Andrews	Heart Shaped World		
May 5, 1999	Nitty Gritty Dirt Band	Bang Bang Bang		
September 21, 1999	Randy Travis	A Man Ain't Made of Stone	US: #130	
October 5, 1999	Redmon & Vale	Redmon & Vale		
November 2, 1999	Toby Keith	How Do You Like Me Now?!	US: #56	RIAA: Platinum
April 25, 2000	Jeff Foxworthy	Big Funny	US: #143	
July 18, 2000	Darryl Worley	Hard Rain Don't Last		
October 31, 2000	Lisa Angelle	Lisa Angelle		
January 27, 2001	Jessica Andrews	Who I Am	US: #22	RIAA: Gold
June 26, 2001	Jolie & the Wanted	Jolie & the Wanted		
August 28, 2001	Toby Keith	Pull My Chain	US: #9	RIAA: 2× Platinum
October 9, 2001	Mike Walker	Mike Walker		
May 21, 2002	Emerson Drive	Emerson Drive	US: #108	
July 16, 2002	Darryl Worley	I Miss My Friend	US: #21	RIAA: Gold
August 6, 2002	Toby Keith	Unleashed	US: #1	RIAA: 4× Platinum
April 15, 2003	Darryl Worley	Have You Forgotten?		
April 15, 2003	Jessica Andrews	Now	US: #34	
June 24, 2003	Jimmy Wayne	Jimmy Wayne	US: #64	
September 16, 2003	Chalee Tennison	Parading in the Rain		
November 4, 2003	Toby Keith	Shock'n Y'all	US: #1	RIAA: 4× Platinum
March 30, 2004	Tracy Lawrence	Strong	US: #17	
June 29, 2004	Emerson Drive	What If?	US: #107	
November 2, 2004	Darryl Worley	Darryl Worley	US: #72	
May 17, 2005	Toby Keith	Honkytonk University	US: #2	RIAA: Platinum
June 28, 2005	Hot Apple Pie	Hot Apple Pie	US: #60	
August 16, 2005	Hanna–McEuen	Hanna–McEuen		
