= Bombshell (song) =

2001 single by Powerman 5000

Single by Powerman 5000

from the album Anyone for Doomsday?
- Released: July 10, 2001
- Genre: Industrial metal
- Length: 3:14
- Label: DreamWorks
- Lyricist: Spider One
- Producers: Terry Date; Ulrich Wild

Powerman 5000 singles chronology
"Get On, Get Off"	"Bombshell"	"Relax"

Music video
- "Bombshell" on YouTube

"Bombshell" (sometimes erroneously called "Drop the Bombshell") is a song by Powerman 5000 from the album Anyone for Doomsday? It was used on the soundtrack for the film Evolution, in Freddy vs. Jason, in the WWF Tough Enough, and in the video game Shaun Palmer's Pro Snowboarder. The song was re-recorded for their 2024 album Abandon Ship as a bonus track.

== Music video ==
A music video was made featuring the 1991–2001 lineup of Powerman 5000 playing first in a desert setting under aerial bombing attacks, followed by large robotic creatures directly invading an urban landscape. It was directed by The Brothers Strause and released in 2001 with DreamWorks Records.

== Release ==
"Bombshell", like Anyone for Doomsday? was regarded as a hotly anticipated release, one which would sell hundreds of thousands of copies. It was reportedly described as "When Worlds Collide Times a Million" in terms of sound. The whole album, as well as "Bombshell", was self-reported by Spider One as having "a much more aggressive edge to it" thanks to Mike Tempesta having more direct influence on the album than in Tonight the Stars Revolt!.

Because of the sudden cancellation of Anyone for Doomsday?, the album's songs became significantly more obscure. The song has been released in four different forms. It has been released as a stand-alone single, as a single with the inclusion of the song "Danger Is Go!" (also from Anyone for Doomsday?), as a standalone track for its re-recorded 2024 single, and as a bonus track for Abandon Ship.

== Track listings ==
"Bombshell (Re-Released)"

Single by Powerman 5000

from the album Abandon Ship
- Released: June 14, 2024
- Genre: Industrial metal
- Length: 3:17
- Lyricist: Spider One

Audio video
- "Bombshell (Re-Released)" on YouTube

=== Bombshell single ===
All tracks are written by Spider One, Mike Tempesta, Dorian Heartsong, Adam Williams, Allan Pahanish.

No.	Title	Length
1.	"Bombshell"	3:14
Total length:		3:14

=== Bombshell/Danger Is Go! single ===
No.	Title	Length
1.	"Bombshell"	3:14
2.	"Danger Is Go!"	3:04

=== Bombshell (Re-Recorded) ===
No.	Title	Length
1.	"Bombshell"	3:17
Total length:		3:17

== Charts ==
Chart (2001)	Peak position
U.S. Billboard Mainstream Rock Tracks	26
