= Destroy What You Enjoy =

Studio album by Powerman 5000
- Released: August 1, 2006
- Recorded: 2005–2006
- Studio: Hobby Shop (Eagle Rock, California)
- Genre: Punk rock
- Length: 38:34
- Label: DRT
- Producer: Mudrock

Powerman 5000 chronology
Korea Tour EP (2005)	Destroy What You Enjoy (2006)	Somewhere on the Other Side of Nowhere (2009)

Singles from Destroy What You Enjoy
- 1. "Wild World" Released: June 2006

Professional ratings
Review scores
Source	Rating
AllMusic	2.5/5 stars
CANOE	(unfavorable)
PopMatters	2/10 stars

Destroy What You Enjoy is the fifth studio album by American rock band Powerman 5000, released on August 1, 2006, by DRT Entertainment. It includes the single "Wild World", which was voted No. 3 on Headbangers Ball's top videos poll of 2006, while the album itself was voted by Metal Edge as one of the "Top 10 Albums of 2006".

== Reception ==
Notably, this was the first Powerman 5000 album to feature none of the members from the Mega!! Kung-Fu Radio to Transform era of the band, with the exception of Spider One. The reaction to this was generally negative, with some calling the best moments of the following record Somewhere on the Other Side of Nowhere the "M.33/Adam 12 stylized" segments" with "an ounce of actual energy," as well as calling Spider himself "rather disengaged more often than not," remarking that the following, more positively-received work "wouldn't be a bad time to call it a day" as opposed to Destroy What You Enjoy.

Destroy What You Enjoy received mixed reactions and reviews upon release. It had also received mostly negative reactions among the fanbase, due to the band's change in the music, shifting more towards the punk rock genre. Spider One, the band's vocalist and leader, claims to have come to terms with the reaction, comparing the record to "Star Wars with no spaceships" and recognizing that it did not match the majority of the band's prior content artistically.

== Legal difficulty ==
Unlike most other Powerman 5000 records, with the exceptions of A Private Little War, The Good, the Bad and the Ugly Vol. 1, and the Korea Tour EP, Destroy What You Enjoy is unavailable for online streaming, which Spider attributed to the album being "wrapped up in some legal issues" in a Reddit Q&A event. It was corroborated further in 2026 that after the closure of DRT in 2009, the record label has held the album "hostage" along with other albums by other artists.

== Track listing ==
All lyrics are written by Spider One; all music is composed by Powerman 5000.

Destroy What You Enjoy track listing
No.	Title	Length
1.	"Construction of the Masses Pt. 1"	0:25
2.	"Destroy What You Enjoy"	3:56
3.	"Return to the City of the Dead"	3:17
4.	"Wild World"	3:20
5.	"Enemies"	2:26
6.	"Murder"	3:25
7.	"Now That's Rock 'N Roll"	3:33
8.	"All My Friends Are Ghosts"	3:16
9.	"Walking Disaster"	3:17
10.	"Who Do You Think You Are?"	3:01
11.	"Construction of the Masses Pt. 2"	0:27
12.	"Miss America"	4:01
13.	"Heroes and Villains (Live)"	4:04
Total length:		38:28

== Personnel ==
Powerman 5000

- Spider One – lead vocals
- Johnny Heatley – lead guitar, backing vocals
- Terry Corso – rhythm guitar
- Siggy Sjursen – bass guitar
- Adrian Ost – drums, backing vocals

Other personnel

- Scott Gilman – organ (Hammond)
- Jon Heintz – mastering
- Myriam Santos-Kayda – photography
- David Schiffman – mixing
