= Cage9 =

Panamanian/American rock band

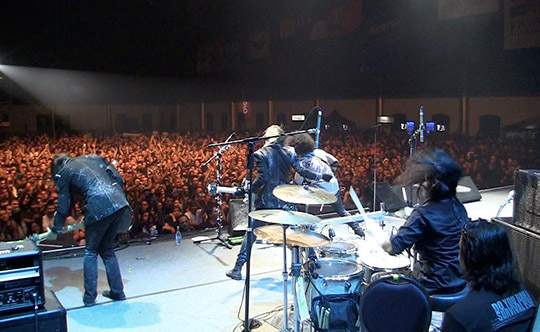
- Cage9 Performing in Panama City opening for Ozzy Osbourne on April 19, 2011

Background information
- Origin: Panama City, Panama
- Genres: Alternative metal; alternative rock; hard rock; post-grunge
- Years active: 1993–2020
- Labels: • EMP Label Group • TRIPLE VISION Entertainment/BM.3 • Universal Music Publishing/MGB Songs • Long Live Crime Records • BMG Songs, Inc.
- Members: Evan Rodaniche (Evan9); Gustavo Aued (X51); Abel Vallejo
- Past members: Giancarlo Costa; Ricardo Costa; Marco Tapia; Servio (Pitongo) Gonzalez; Jorge (Tercero) Loaiza; Ivan (Pipo) Canton; Warren Johnson; Ryan Delfino; Eric Toohey; James Decker; Murv Douglas; Rattan (DJ Rattan) Cayabyab; Gordon Heckaman; Damion Sanchez; Joe Babiak; Michael Anthony Grajewski; Aristotle Dreher; Jesse Beltz; Chase Bryan; Brian Sumwalt; Leslie Wyatt; Feudor Lokshin; Matthew Borowski
- Website: cage9.com

Cage9 is a Panamanian/American rock band, formed in Panama City in 1993. The group was founded by Evan Rodaniche (guitar/vocals) and is currently based out of Los Angeles, California, since 2002.

Cage9 has been direct openers for Ozzy Osbourne and Bad Religion, as well as having shared the stage with notable acts like 12 Stones, Black Light Burns, CJ Ramone, Adema, Lacey Sturm, Asking Alexandria, Ill Niño, Bobaflex, Queensrÿche, Candlebox, Seether, Sevendust, Hellyeah, Filter, In This Moment, Tesla, Karnivool, Buckcherry, MxPx, Powerman 5000, Strata, Dokken, Quiet Riot, Lynch Mob, Hinder, Boy Hits Car, Smile Empty Soul, Caifanes, Journey, Cheap Trick, 38 Special, Attaque 77, Moderatto, Fobia, Maldita Vecindad, SR-71's Mitch Allan, and Ice-T's Body Count among many others bands and acts.

The band's song "My Doppelgänger (Doble Opuesto)," from El Motivo were released in English as well in Spanish and received full rotation on MTV Latino. The song "Hearts & Stars" is on the soundtrack of the video game MX vs. ATV: Untamed. Cage9 recorded a version of the theme song “Good Ol’ Boys” for The Dukes of Hazzard, which was used in the trailers for the 2005 film and The Dukes of Hazzard: The Beginning. The band also recorded music for a WWE promotion for Stone Cold Steve Austin and Dolph Ziggler. The theme song for Kamen Rider: Dragon Knight, called "Let's Ride", was also written by the band. On March 3, 2006, Cage9 made an appearance on G4's Attack of the Show!. The band also played live at Dave Navarro's Spread Entertainment Show in 2007. Cage9 performed in November 2011 at the annual rock cruise “Shiprocked”. On January 10, 2012, Cage9 was included in a rock compilation album from DSN Music titled Soundtrack to The End Times with the previously unreleased song “Needles and Pins”; They also recorded and released a cover of the Game of Thrones main theme in 2014.

The song “With The Lights Out” can be heard as the intro of the Black Veil Bride's Andy Black talk show and a couple of songs from their album Survival Plan featured in the Rob Dyrdek's ”Fantasy Factory”.

Performing under the pseudonym "Evan9," Rodaniche was the guitar player for the band Powerman 5000 between 2007 and 2011 and produced their 2009 album Somewhere on the Other Side of Nowhere and their 2014 album Builders of the Future as well.

In 2012, Cage9 toured the U.S. with The Sammus Theory, with additional shows in Japan as part of The Unionway Festival.

The band spent 2013 and 2014 on tour supporting their album How to Shoot Lasers from Your Eyes. After it they started the recording sessions for a new album later called “Illuminator”.

On June 3, 2016, Cage9 released their album Illuminator on EMP Label Group, and was followed by a series of shows and fests. They closed the year touring with Lacey Sturm across the U.S.

In 2017 former bassist and longtime member Gustavo Aued returned to the band after playing with Powerman 5000 from 2008 to 2015. Since then the band has just played selective shows and festivals.

On January 22, 2019, Cage9 released Hypesthesia (hypoesthesia is a reduced or loss of sensitivity to sensory stimuli; numbness), their new album after a year in the making.

The band released a single titled “D.O.A.” on April 24, 2020, and have been on an indefinite hiatus since its release.

== Discography ==
- Master Blaster (1995)
- Audiophiliac (1997)
- Human Feedback (2000)
- Fearful Orbits (Unreleased) (2002)
- The Onyx Inch EP (2004)
- El Motivo (2005)
- El Motivo (Spanish Version) (2005)
- Chaos Morning (Compilation Album) (2007)
- For Amnesia... (Acoustic Album) (2008)
- Survival Plan (2009)
- How To Shoot Lasers From Your Eyes (2012)
- Illuminator (2016)
- Hypesthesia (2019)
