= Evolution (2001 film) =

2001 science fiction comedy film by Ivan Reitman

- Theatrical release poster
- Directed by: Ivan Reitman
- Screenplay by: David Diamond; David Weissman; Don Jakoby
- Story by: Don Jakoby
- Produced by: Daniel Goldberg; Joe Medjuck; Ivan Reitman
- Starring: David Duchovny; Orlando Jones; Seann William Scott; Ted Levine; Julianne Moore
- Cinematography: Michael Chapman
- Edited by: Wendy Greene Bricmont; Sheldon Kahn
- Music by: John Powell
- Production company: The Montecito Picture Company
- Distributed by: DreamWorks Pictures (through DreamWorks Distribution LLC; United States and Canada); Columbia Pictures (through Columbia TriStar Film Distributors International; International)
- Release date: June 8, 2001
- Running time: 101 minutes
- Country: United States
- Language: English
- Budget: $80 million
- Box office: $98.4 million

Evolution is a 2001 American science fiction comedy film directed by Ivan Reitman and written by David Diamond and David Weissman, based on a story by Don Jakoby. The film stars David Duchovny, Orlando Jones, Seann William Scott, Ted Levine, and Julianne Moore in lead roles. The plot follows college professor Ira Kane (Duchovny) and geologist Harry Block (Jones) as they investigate a meteor crash in Arizona, only to discover that it harbors rapidly evolving extraterrestrial life forms.

The film was produced by The Montecito Picture Company and released by DreamWorks Pictures in the United States on June 8, 2001, and by Columbia Pictures internationally. Evolution received mixed-to-negative reviews from film critics with criticism for its storyline, screenplay and pacing; however, the performances of the cast received minor praise. It emerged as a disappointment at the box-office, grossing $98.4 million worldwide against a production budget of $80 million, but nonetheless earned a cult following. A short-lived animated series, Alienators: Evolution Continues, loosely based on the film, was broadcast months after the film was released.

== Plot ==
Late one night, a large meteor crashes in the Arizona desert, witnessed by aspiring firefighter Wayne Grey. The next morning, college professors Ira Kane and Harry Block investigate the crash site, discovering that the meteor has landed in a cave and secretes a strange blue liquid. Upon further study, they find that the meteor harbors extraterrestrial microorganisms that evolve rapidly, condensing millions of years of evolution into mere hours.

Over the next few days, the organisms evolve into fungi, flatworms, and aquatic creatures, despite being unable to breathe oxygen. As the United States Army takes control of the site, Ira and Harry attempt to continue their research with the help of Brigadier General Russell Woodman and epidemiologist Dr. Allison Reed. However, the Army soon shuts them out, prompting Ira to go to court, where he admits that he was discharged from the Army after an anthrax vaccine experiment went wrong, causing severe side effects in 140,000 soldiers.

Frustrated by the Army's takeover, Ira and Harry infiltrate the base to collect a new sample, only to find that the cave now harbors a full-fledged alien ecosystem, complete with tropical plants and animals. The situation escalates when a large reptilian creature kills the owner of a local country club, and other alien creatures begin attacking residents of nearby areas. The creatures, though unable to survive in Earth's oxygen-rich environment, are rapidly evolving to adapt.

As the alien attacks become public, Governor Lewis demands answers, and Reed calculates that the alien organisms could overrun the U.S. within two months. Despite opposition, Woodman authorizes a napalm strike to destroy the meteor and its surrounding ecosystem. However, Ira realizes that heat accelerates the aliens' evolution and that the napalm strike will only cause further problems.

In a desperate attempt to destroy the ecosystem, Ira theorizes that selenium, toxic to nitrogen-based life forms, could kill the aliens. With the help of his students, Ira discovers that selenium sulfide, the active ingredient in Head & Shoulders shampoo, could be their solution. Armed with a fire truck filled with shampoo, the team heads to the ecosystem to carry out their plan, but the army initiates the napalm strike early, fusing the alien life into a gigantic amoeba-like creature. Regardless, the team injects the creature with the shampoo via an enema on its central hole just as it begins to multiply into two, causing it to implode.

With the alien threat neutralized, Governor Lewis declares Ira, Harry, Wayne, and Allison as heroes. Wayne is finally made a full firefighter, and Ira and Allison begin a romantic relationship, while the town returns to normal.

== Cast ==
- David Duchovny as Colonel (Ret.) Dr. Ira Kane, a college science professor and disgraced top-level army researcher
- Orlando Jones as Professor Harry Phineas Block, a college science professor and volleyball coach who aids Ira in his conquest
- Seann William Scott as Wayne Grey, an aspiring firefighter who assists Ira and Harry
- Julianne Moore as Dr. Allison Reed, a researcher employed by the CDC
- Ted Levine as Brigadier General Russell Woodman
- Ethan Suplee as Deke Donald
- Katharine Towne as Nadine
- Michael Ray Bower as Danny Donald
- Pat Kilbane as Officer Sam Johnson
- Ty Burrell as Colonel Flemming
- Gregory Itzin as Barry Cartwright
- Dan Aykroyd as Governor Lewis, the governor of Arizona
- Ashley Clark as Lieutenant Cryer
- Stephanie Hodge as Jill Mason
- Kyle Gass as Officer Drake
- Sarah Silverman as Denise
- Jerry Trainor as Tommy
- Miriam Flynn as Grace
- Steven Gilborn as Judge Guilder
- Richard Moll as Fire Training Inspector
- Tom Davis and Gary Kent as the Governor's Aides
- Mary Pat Gleason as a Customer
- John Cho as a Student

== Production ==
=== Development ===
Evolution was based on a story by Don Jakoby. Director Ivan Reitman loved the script but saw potential in transforming it into a successful comedy, describing it as a "modern-day successor to Ghostbusters (1984)." Reitman hired writers David Diamond and David Weissman to rewrite much of Jakoby's script, incorporating elements from another screenplay by Todd Phillips and Scot Armstrong about three friends hunting aliens. Initially, Jakoby was upset by the tonal shift, but Diamond and Weissman worked closely with him to ensure the final product was something he was happy with. The original script ended with a "battle of wits" between humans and an ultra-intelligent alien species, but this was replaced with the more action-packed climax seen in the final film.

Reitman had worked with David Duchovny on Beethoven (1992), where he had a small role, and envisioned him as the lead for Evolution, recognizing his ability to handle comedy. Duchovny discussed a respective role in Star Wars: Episode II – Attack of the Clones (2002) and Star Wars: Episode III – Revenge of the Sith (2005) with George Lucas, but turned it down in part due to his schedule shooting this movie. He sought to distance himself from his iconic The X-Files character and saw this comedic alien film as an opportunity to transition into different roles. Seann William Scott was cast after impressing Reitman with his performance in Road Trip (2000), another film Reitman produced. Scott beat out Jerry Trainor, who was given a smaller role. Michael J. Fox was also offered a lead role but declined due to his ongoing battle with Parkinson's disease.

=== Filming ===
Shooting for Evolution took place from October 19, 2000, to February 7, 2001, in Page, Arizona, and around the Greater Los Angeles area, particularly in the Santa Clarita, California region. Scenes set at the fictional Glen Canyon Community College were filmed at California State University, Fullerton. The shopping mall sequences were shot at Hawthorne Plaza in Hawthorne, California. The first scene filmed was the monster attack on two elderly women. Studio filming occurred at Downey Studios and Raleigh Studios.

=== Visual effects ===
Tippett Studio was tasked with designing over 18 distinct alien creatures for Evolution, ensuring each had a unique appearance. Sony Pictures Imageworks handled the CGI animation for several key sequences, including the alien flatworm and the leech alien from the pool, which was designed by Peter Konig. They also created the animation for the alien mosquito moving inside Harry's body. Additional visual effects were provided by Pacific Data Images. Studio ADI was responsible for designing the primate-like alien creatures featured in the film.

== Music ==
The film's music score was composed by John Powell, conducted by Gavin Greenaway, and performed by the Hollywood Symphony Orchestra. A soundtrack album for the background score was released on June 12, 2001. This album was handled by soundtrack specialty label Varèse Sarabande, rather than by DreamWorks Records or any of the labels owned by Columbia's sister company Sony Music Entertainment. Additionally, the film used several licensed songs, including songs from artists signed to DreamWorks Records such as Buckcherry, Powerman 5000 and Self. The following songs appeared throughout the film, often used diegetically:

Title	Artist	Written by
"Bombshell"	Powerman 5000	Mike Tempesta and Michael Cummings
"Out with a Bang"	Self	Matt Mahaffey
"Anyway the Main Thing Is"	Patty Larkin	Patty Larkin
"Borderline"	Buckcherry	Josh Todd, Jonathan 'JB' Brighman, Keith Nelson and Devon Glenn
"Baby, Come On Over"	Samantha Mumba	Samantha Mumba, Arnthor Birgisson and Anders Bagge
"Work It Out"	Brassy	Muffin Spencer, Stefan Gordon, Jonny Barrington and Karen Frost
"Makin' Whoopee"	Walter Donaldson, Gus Kahn	Walter Donaldson, Gus Kahn
"Parking Lot"	Morgan Nagler	Morgan Nagler
"You Are So Beautiful"	Bruce Fisher, Billy Preston	Bruce Fisher, Billy Preston
"Play That Funky Music"	Wild Cherry	Rob Parissi

== Reception ==
On the review aggregator Rotten Tomatoes, Evolution holds an approval rating of 44% based on 140 reviews, with an average score of 4.90/10. The website's critical consensus states, "Director Reitman tries to remake Ghostbusters, but his efforts are largely unsuccessful because the movie has too many comedic misfires." On Metacritic, the film has a score of 40 based on 32 reviews, indicating "mixed or average reviews." Audiences surveyed by CinemaScore gave the film a grade of B+ on an A to F scale.

Todd McCarthy of Variety called the film "a consistently amusing action romp." Roger Ebert of the Chicago Sun-Times gave it 2.5 out of 4 stars, stating, "It's not good, but it's nowhere near as bad as most recent comedies; it has real laughs, but it misses just as many real opportunities." A. O. Scott of The New York Times wrote, "The movie itself evolves in reverse, starting life as a moderately clever grab bag of high-concept noodling and half-witty badinage before descending into the primordial ooze of explosions and elaborate lower-intestinal gags."

== Home media ==
Evolution was released on VHS and DVD on December 26, 2001. In international regions such as Australia and the United Kingdom, the VHS/DVD releases were handled by Columbia TriStar Home Entertainment, with the domestic VHS/DVD releases handled by DreamWorks Home Entertainment. In China, Columbia TriStar Home Entertainment released the film on the VCD format.

In February 2006, Viacom (now known as Paramount Skydance) acquired the rights to Evolution, along with the rights to all 58 other live-action films DreamWorks had released since 1997, following their billion-dollar acquisition of the company's live-action assets and television assets. DreamWorks were listed as the sole copyright holder in the credits of Evolution, suggesting that Paramount currently has overall ownership of the film, despite Columbia's initial international distribution rights to the film. (Note: Copyright notice in the credits for Evolution, 2001.)

The film later received a Blu-ray release in the United States on November 23, 2021, by Paramount Home Entertainment. A separate Blu-ray release of the Columbia version was made available in the United Kingdom on April 22, 2024, through 88 Films.

== Television series ==
Evolution was adapted into an animated series titled Alienators: Evolution Continues, which aired on Fox Kids from 2001 to 2002. The series loosely followed the film's premise, expanding on the storyline with new characters and alien creatures, but aimed at a younger audience. The series was a co-production between Columbia TriStar Television, DreamWorks Television, DiC Entertainment and other parities. The ownership for the animated series was split between DiC and DreamWorks Television (now Paramount). Like with the film itself, Columbia are not listed among the copyright holders in the credits. (Note: Copyright notice in the credits for Alienators: Evolution Continues, 2001.)
