= The Noble Rot =

Studio album by Powerman 5000
- Released: August 28, 2020
- Genres: Industrial; electronica
- Length: 33:03
- Label: Cleopatra
- Producers: Greg Johnson, Spider One

Powerman 5000 chronology
New Wave (2017)	The Noble Rot (2020)	Abandon Ship (2024)

The Noble Rot is the tenth studio album by American rock band Powerman 5000. It was released on August 28, 2020, through Cleopatra Records.

== Reception ==
The Noble Rot received favourable reviews. Dawn Brown of Metal Wani gave it a rating of 8/10, commenting that "while this album very much follows the general nature and disposition of Powerman 5000, it's really not a metal album. It walks a fine line between industrial and electronica. However, the lyrics are offbeat, eccentric, and expertly crafted for the songs therein. The Noble Rot is a must-listen if you're a fan of Powerman 5000 or the fantastic camp of a B-movie." Jeannie Blue of Cryptic Rock gave it 5/5 stars. She noted that "despite a plethora of lineup changes that have left Spider as the last original man standing, eight additional records have followed over the past 21 years, including 2001's Anyone for Doomsday?, 2006's Destroy What You Enjoy, and 2017's New Wave. But nothing can keep a good band down."

== Track listing ==
All lyrics are written by Spider One except "We Got The Beat" by Charlotte Caffey; all music is composed by Spider One & Greg Johnson except where noted.

No.	Title	Music	Length
1.	"Cannibal Killers That Kill Everyone"		2:49
2.	"Brave New World"		2:50
3.	"Play God Or Play Dead"		2:48
4.	"Black Lipstick"		3:23
5.	"Special Effects"		2:46
6.	"Let The Insects Rule"		3:36
7.	"Movie Blood"		3:13
8.	"Strange People Doing Strange Things"		3:24
9.	"We Got The Beat (The Go-Go's cover)"	Charlotte Caffey	2:31
10.	"VHS"		2:48
11.	"When Worlds Collide (2020) [Bonus Track]"	Spider One, Dorian Heartsong, Mike Tempesta, Adam Williams	2:57
Total length:			33:03

== Personnel ==
=== Powerman 5000 ===
- Spider One - vocals
- Ty Oliver - lead guitar
- Taylor Haycraft - rhythm guitar
- Murv Douglas - bass
- DJ Rattan - drums, percussion

=== Production ===
- Spider One - production, artwork
- Greg Johnson - production, additional guitars
