= Abandon Ship (Powerman 5000 album) =

Studio album by Powerman 5000
- Released: May 10, 2024
- Genre: Industrial metal
- Length: 36:38
- Label: Cleopatra
- Producers: Matt McJunkins; Spider One

Powerman 5000 chronology
The Noble Rot (2020)	Abandon Ship (2024)

Abandon Ship is the eleventh studio album by American rock band Powerman 5000. It was released on May 10, 2024 through Cleopatra Records.

== Reception ==
Abandon Ship has received generally positive reviews. Duke Togo of Regenmag called it "rather mundane and uninspired, recalling but not reliving the rock & roll glory of bygone days," while Cryptic Rock called it "one of the most potent Powerman 5000 efforts of the last decade" and "a fantastic return from Powerman 5000", rating it at a 4.5/5. Meesha Walden of I'm Music Magazine stated it was an "exciting mix of catchy industrial metal dance anthems with profoundly grim themes" and Snidermann of Rough Edge called it "simply the best PM5K release I have ever heard".

== Track listing ==
All lyrics are written by Spider One; all music is composed by Spider One and Matt McJunkins, except "Bombshell" by Spider One, Adam Williams, Mike Tempesta, Dorian Heartsong, and Al Pahanish

No.	Title	Length
1.	"Invisible Man"	3:01
2.	"1999"	3:18
3.	"Dancing Like We're Dead"	3:28
4.	"Wake Up Take Space"	3:15
5.	"The Company Loves Misery"	2:52
6.	"Bloodsuckers"	3:10
7.	"This Is a Life"	2:27
8.	"GTFO"	3:30
9.	"Places for People That Scream"	3:36
10.	"The Last Chapter"	4:44
11.	"Bombshell"	3:17
Total length:		36:38

== Personnel ==
- Spider One – vocals, composition, lyrics, production
- Matt McJunkins – instrumentation, composition, mixing, production
