= Korea Tour EP =

The Korea EP

EP by Powerman 5000
- Released: August 1, 2005
- Genres: Nu metal; industrial rock; punk rock
- Length: 12:27
- Label: Megatronic

Powerman 5000 chronology
The Good, the Bad and the Ugly Vol. 1 (2004)	The Korea EP (2005)	Destroy What You Enjoy (2006)

The Korea EP is an EP by American rock band Powerman 5000. The EP was released as a limited-edition CD during the band's South Korea tour in August 2005. During the band's time in South Korea, they performed at the Rolling Hall in Seoul and was scheduled to perform at the Busan Rock Festival, but was cancelled due to visa issues. The EP includes four Powerman 5000 songs that do not appear on any other official release. However, a live version of "Heroes and Villains" was later included on the band's studio album Destroy What You Enjoy. The Korea EP was also available for purchase at shows during the Return to the City of the Dead Tour '07, and eventually became available on the official Powerman 5000 website.

"Last Night on Earth", "Riot Time", and "That's the Way It Is" were all previously featured in the 2004 video game WWE SmackDown! vs. RAW.

== Track listing ==
No.	Title	Length
1.	"Heroes & Villains"	3:16
2.	"The Way It Is"	3:14
3.	"Riot Time"	3:29
4.	"Last Night on Earth"	2:23

== Credits ==
- Spider One - vocals
- Adrian, AKA Mr7 - drums
- Siggy *00* - bass
- Johnny Rock Heatley - guitar
- Terry Corso - guitar
