= Jeff Stewart (music video director) =

Jeff Stewart is a music video director signed to Sugarshock Imageworks in Burbank, California.

== Videography ==
- Squad Five-0 - Bye American - 2004
- Shimmer - Don't Trip on Your Way Out - 2005
- Powerman 5000 - Wild World - 2006
- Cody McCarver – Red Flag – 2006
- Dustin Kensrue - Pistol - 2006

== Producer ==
- Powerman 5000 - Wild World - 2006
- Cody McCarver – Red Flag – 2006
- Dustin Kensrue - Pistol - 2006
- Billy Bob Thornton - Hearts Like Mine - 2007

== Television ==
Jeff Stewart directed the pilot of a TV show for Lionsgate titled Death Valley with Spider One from Powerman 5000. Rob Zombie is rumored to be involved in this project as an Executive Producer.

== Awards and notable mentions ==
Powerman 5000's Wild World was nominated for MTV2's HBB Best Video of the Year Award 2006.

Powerman 5000's Wild World was featured in Revolver Magazine's Best Videos of 2006 article.
