= Jason Bonham's Led Zeppelin Evening =

Led Zeppelin tribute band

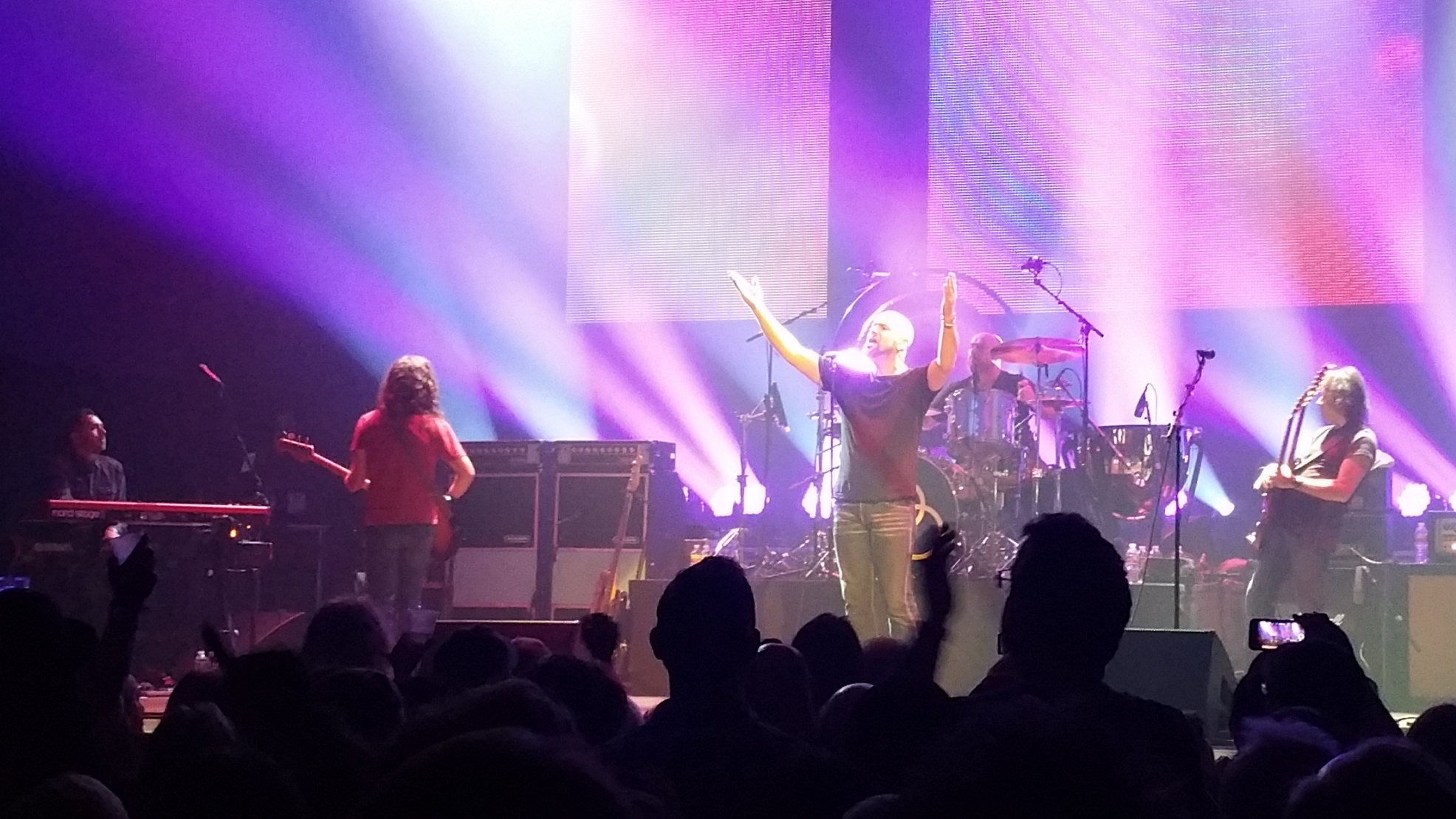
- Jason Bonham's Led Zeppelin Experience performing in 2016

Background information
- Origin: Hamilton, Ontario, Canada
- Genres: Hard rock; blues rock; folk rock; tribute band
- Years active: 2010–present
- Members: Jason Bonham; James Dylan; Dorian Heartsong; Alex Howland; Akio Sakurai
- Past members: Tony Catania; Stephen LeBlanc; Michael Devin

Jason Bonham's Led Zeppelin Evening, originally known as Jason Bonham's Led Zeppelin Experience (2010-2017), are a English–Canadian hard rock music band formed in Hamilton, Ontario in 2010, are a Led Zeppelin tribute band led by Jason Bonham, the son of late drummer John Bonham.

== Background ==
Jason Bonham founded the group in 2010. Bonham previously played with Led Zeppelin in 1988, 1990, and 2007. After the 2007 reunion, Bonham had stated an interest in touring and recording with Led Zeppelin, but singer Robert Plant didn't agree. The band's first line-up included guitarist Tony Catania, vocalist James Dylan, bassist Michael Devin and keyboardist/steel guitarist Stephen LeBlanc. Catania had played with Bonham in his previous band, Bonham.

== Members ==
- Jason Bonham – drums, backing vocals (2010–present)
- James Dylan – vocals, acoustic guitar (2010–present)
- Tony Catania – lead guitar (2010–2017)
- Stephen LeBlanc – keyboards, guitar, lap steel guitar (2010–2012)
- Michael Devin – bass, harmonica (2010)
- Dorian Heartsong – bass, mandolin (2011–present)
- Alex Howland – keyboards, guitar (2014–present)
- Akio “Mr. Jimmy” Sakurai – lead guitar (2017–present)
