= Ron Handler =

American businessman

Ronald Craig Handler is a music publisher, A & R executive and artist manager, who lives in Los Angeles. He has worked for influential companies such as Arista Music Publishing, BMG, EMI, DreamWorks and Interscope/Geffen. During his career, he has signed numerous artists and songwriters, such as Rhett Lawrence (Mariah Carey), JD Souther (The Eagles), DJ Bobcat (2Pac), Presidents of the United States of America, Bad Religion, Filter, R&B writers Tim & Bob, Papa Roach, Sparta (At the Drive-In), Eric Sermon (EPMD), Dave Hollister (Blackstreet), Alien Ant Farm, Rise Against and Powerman 5000. He also worked with John Hiatt, Diane Warren, Holly Knight, Mike Chapman (Tina Turner), Gerry Goffin (Aretha Franklin), and Robbie Robertson.

Handler is featured in the book On the Record: Over 150 of the most talented people in music share the secrets of their success.

He formed Handler Entertainment, an independent film production company producing feature documentaries and short form internet content.
