= Dorian Heartsong =

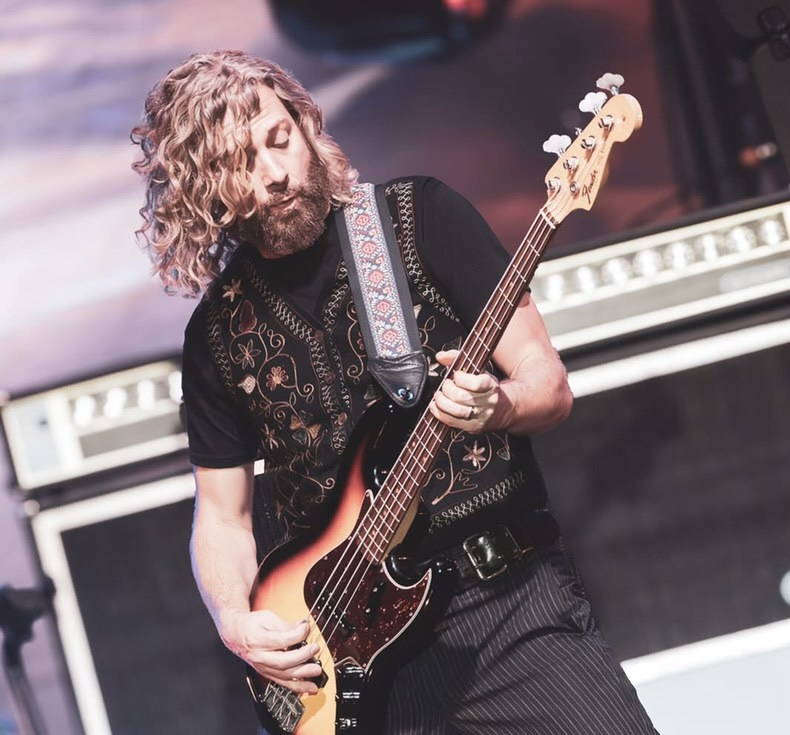
- Heartsong in 2026

Background information
- Also known as: Dorian 27; Dorian
- Genres: Rock, Indie, R&B, Funk, Soul
- Instrument: Bass
- Years active: 1990–present
- Member of: Jason Bonham's Led Zeppelin Evening
- Formerly of: Powerman 5000; The Flying Tigers; Ruby Friedman Orchestra
- Website: dorianheartsong.com

Dorian Heartsong (also known as Dorian 27) is an American rock bassist. He played bass on all Powerman 5000 releases and live shows from 1990 to 2001. After leaving Powerman, Heartsong has performed and recorded with other artists and producers including Everlast, Vinnie Moore, Ruby Friedman Orchestra, The Flying Tigers, Dan Rockett, Stevie Salas, Michael Beinhorn, Lior Goldenberg, Sylvia Massey, Joe Barrisi, and Terry Date.

He currently plays with Jason Bonham's Led Zeppelin Evening.

== Background ==
Heartsong moved to Boston, after which he would meet Spider One and Allan Pahanish while working at Tower Records. They went on to found Powerman 5000 in 1990, collaborating for over a decade and releasing the platinum album Tonight the Stars Revolt!. Following the cancellation of Anyone for Doomsday?, Heartsong left Powerman 5000 as well as Pahanish. He then joined The Flying Tigers, crediting the events of September 11, 2001 as a motivator for desiring a new, "more melodic" sound. The Flying Tigers toured with Trik Turner and supporting their eponymous record produced by Brendan O'Brien.

From there, Heartsong would play in L.A. with Ruby Friedman Orchestra briefly before joining JBLZE in 2011. They played in such venues as Madison Square Garden and the LA Forum in 2019.

== Discography ==
=== With Powerman 5000 ===
- A Private Little War (1993)
- True Force (1994)
- The Blood-Splat Rating System (1995)
- Mega Kung-Fu Radio!! (1997)
- Tonight the Stars Revolt! (1999)
- Anyone for Doomsday? (2001)

=== With The Flying Tigers ===
- The Flying Tigers (2001)

=== With Vinnie Moore ===
- Out of Nowhere (1996)
- Aerial Visions (2015)

=== With Stevie Salas ===
- Shapeshifter (2002)
- Be What It Is (2006)
- Set It On Blast (2008)

=== With Everlast ===
- White Trash Beautiful (2004)

=== With Grant Ganzer ===
- A4 (2019)

=== With Band on the Moon ===
- Reflections in a Two-Way Mirror (2021)
