= New Wave (Powerman 5000 album) =

Studio album by Powerman 5000
- Released: October 27, 2017
- Studio: Clearlake Studios (Burbank, California)
- Genre: Industrial metal; punk rock
- Length: 31:00
- Label: Pavement
- Producer: Greg Johnson, Spider One

Powerman 5000 chronology
Builders of the Future (2014)	New Wave (2017)	The Noble Rot (2020)

Singles from New Wave
- 1. "Sid Vicious In a Dress" Released: August 25, 2017; 2. "Cult Leader" Released: October 13, 2017; 3. "Footsteps and Voices" Released: June 27, 2018

Professional ratings
Review scores
Source	Rating
Blabbermouth.net	8/10
Classic Rock	3/5 stars
Cryptic Rock	4/5
Metal Hammer	1.5/5 stars

New Wave is the ninth studio album by American rock band Powerman 5000. It was released on October 27, 2017, through Pavement Entertainment. To support the album's release, Powerman 5000 toured the United States through the end of 2017 on the New Wave Tour.

== Reception ==
Ray Van Horn, Jr. gave the album a rating of 8 out of 10 for Blabbermouth.net, calling it "a lot of fun".

Metal Hammer / Team Rock named it one of the 10 worst albums of 2017, referring to it "at best, is all a bit dated and trite, and at worst is desperately dunderheaded cack that makes Five Finger Death Punch sound like Devin Townsend."

== Track listing ==
All lyrics are written by Spider One.

No.	Title	Music	Length
1.	"Footsteps and Voices"	Greg Johnson	3:21
2.	"Hostage"	Spider One, Ryan Hernandez	2:44
3.	"Sid Vicious in a Dress"	Greg Johnson	3:39
4.	"David Fucking Bowie"	Spider One, Ryan Hernandez	3:13
5.	"Cult Leader"	Spider One, Greg Johnson	3:18
6.	"No White Flags"	Ryan Hernandez, Greg Johnson	4:20
7.	"Thank God"	Spider One, Greg Johnson	1:11
8.	"Die on Your Feet"	Ryan Hernandez, Greg Johnson	2:31
9.	"Get a Life"	Ryan Hernandez, Greg Johnson	2:51
10.	"Run for Your Life"	Spider One, Greg Johnson	3:05
Total length:			31:00

== Personnel ==
Powerman 5000

- Spider One – vocals
- Ryan Hernandez – guitars
- Ty Oliver – guitars
- Murv Douglas – bass
- DJ Rattan – drums

Additional musicians

- Greg Johnson – additional guitars
- Kevin Garcia – additional drums

Production

- Greg Johnson – producer
- Spider One – producer
- Recorded at Starlight Manor (Burbank, California) and Clearlake Studios (California)
