= Copies, Clones & Replicants =

Studio album of cover songs by Powerman 5000
- Released: August 30, 2011
- Genre: New wave
- Length: 39:21
- Label: Cleopatra
- Producer: Powerman 5000

Powerman 5000 chronology
Somewhere on the Other Side of Nowhere (2009)	Copies, Clones & Replicants (2011)	Builders of the Future (2014)

Copies, Clones & Replicants is the seventh studio album by American rock band Powerman 5000. It is their first (and only) cover album, tackling some of the band's favorite tracks, which usually fall into the new wave genre.

== Track listing ==
No.	Title	Writer(s)	Original artist (year)	Length
1.	"20th Century Boy"	Marc Bolan	T. Rex (1973)	3:09
2.	"Electric Avenue"	Eddy Grant	Eddy Grant (1982)	3:22
3.	"Whip It"	Mark Mothersbaugh; Gerald Casale	Devo (1980)	2:40
4.	"Jump"	David Lee Roth; Eddie Van Halen; Michael Anthony; Alex Van Halen	Van Halen (1984)	3:12
5.	"Space Oddity"	David Bowie	David Bowie (1969)	4:07
6.	"One Thing Leads to Another"	Cy Curnin; Jamie West-Oram; Alfie Augius; Rupert Greenall; Adam Woods	The Fixx (1983)	2:48
7.	"Candy-O"	Ric Ocasek	The Cars (1979)	2:24
8.	"Devil Inside"	Michael Hutchence; Andrew Farriss	INXS (1987)	4:11
9.	"Pop Muzik"	Robin Scott	M (1979)	2:45
10.	"Should I Stay or Should I Go"	Joe Strummer; Mick Jones; Paul Simonon; Topper Headon	The Clash (1982)	3:24
11.	"We're Not Gonna Take It"	Dee Snider	Twisted Sister (1984)	3:01
12.	"Under the Milky Way"	Steve Kilbey; Karin Jansson	The Church (1988)	4:22

== Personnel ==
Powerman 5000

- Spider One – vocals, production
- Velkro – guitar, production, engineer
- X51 – bass, production
- GFlash – drums, production

Additional

- Anthony Focx – mastering
- Bruno O'Hara – photography
