= Road Trip (soundtrack) =

2000 soundtrack album by various artists

Soundtrack album by Various
- Released: 2000
- Genres: Pop; rock; hip-hop
- Label: DreamWorks

Professional ratings
Review scores
Source	Rating
Allmusic	2.5/5 stars

Road Trip is the soundtrack to the comedy film, Road Trip.

== Album information ==
The main title music for the movie, "The University of Ithaca Alma Mater", was not included in the soundtrack album. It was composed by Gordon Henderson, director of the UCLA Bruin Marching Band, and it was recorded by 30 members of the UCLA Band late one night in the UCLA Band Room. For legal reasons, the UCLA name could not be used in the film's credits, so "Gordon Henderson and his Midnight Music Makers" is listed in the closing credits.

== Track listing ==
1. Eels – "Mr. E's Beautiful Blues"
2. Kid Rock and Uncle Kracker – "E.M.S.P."
3. Jungle Brothers – "Early Morning"
4. Run–D.M.C. – "It's Tricky"
5. Buckcherry – "Anything, Anything (I'll Give You)"
6. The K.G.B. – "Fortune and Fame"
7. Supergrass – "Pumping on Your Stereo"
8. Jon Spencer Blues Explosion – "Lovin' Machine"
9. Twisted Sister – "I Wanna Rock"
10. Ween – "Voodoo Lady"
11. Ash – "I'm Gonna Fall"
12. Minnie Riperton – "Inside My Love"
