= DreamWorks Records =

American record label

- Parent company: Interscope Geffen A&M (Universal Music Group)
- Founded: 1996; 30 years ago (DreamWorks Records); June 1997; 29 years ago (DreamWorks Nashville)
- Founder: David Geffen; Mo Ostin; Michael Ostin; Lenny Waronker
- Defunct: January 9, 2005; 21 years ago (DreamWorks Records); September 1, 2005; 21 years ago (DreamWorks Nashville)
- Distributors: US: Geffen Records; International: BMG Music (before 1999); Polydor (starting in 1999)
- Genre: Various
- Country of origin: United States
- Location: Universal City, California (1996–1999); Beverly Hills, California (1999–2006)

DreamWorks Records (often referred in copyright notices as SKG Music, LLC) was an American record label founded in 1996 by David Geffen, Mo Ostin, his son Michael Ostin and Lenny Waronker as a subsidiary of DreamWorks Pictures. The label operated until January 9, 2005, when it was sold to Universal Music Group. The label itself also featured a Nashville, Tennessee-based subsidiary, DreamWorks Nashville, which specialized in country music and was shut down in 2005 then moved to MCA Nashville. The company's logo was designed by Roy Lichtenstein and was his last commission before his death on September 29, 1997. DreamWorks Pictures' DreamWorks Records catalogue is managed by Music Corporation of America, while its DreamWorks Nashville catalogue is managed by MCA Nashville.

== History ==
=== Early years and soundtrack album releases ===
In October 1994, four years after David Geffen sold his former record label Geffen Records to MCA Music Entertainment, he joined Steven Spielberg and Jeffrey Katzenberg to form DreamWorks Pictures (also known as DreamWorks SKG). SKG stood for Spielberg, Katzenberg & Geffen. Geffen was still contracted to the now MCA-owned Geffen Records at that time, but stood down in April 1995. The three partners later launched the subsidiary record label DreamWorks Records in early 1996. Geffen focused on the music division of DreamWorks, with the live-action film division being handled closely by Spielberg, and Katzenberg focusing on the animated film division. Geffen recruited experienced music industry figures for DreamWorks Records, including Mo Ostin and his son Michael, and Lenny Waronker. The label was presided over by Waronker and Mo Ostin – who ran Warner Bros. Records until the mid-1990s – and Michael Ostin, who served as the president of DreamWorks Records. Mo Ostin stated at the time: "what you find in the record business is there is more and more a trend toward corporate control, corporate values, and here you’re dealing with a creatively oriented operation."

Canadian singer-songwriter Rufus Wainwright was the first artist to be signed to the new record label, in early 1996. Another early signing, George Michael, joined the label after a legal dispute with Sony Music Entertainment. As part of the settlement with Sony, they allowed future Michael albums to have US/Canadian distribution by the new DreamWorks Records label, with international distribution going to Virgin Records. Wainwright later noted that he and Michael, two of the label's earliest signings, were both homosexual, with label founder Geffen himself being homosexual. The logo for the label was the last project completed by artist Roy Lichtenstein. The distinctive design, incorporating a musical note in the artist's trademark "dream balloon," debuted on the packaging for Beautiful Freak, the first album from Los Angeles-based band Eels, and the second release from the record company. The record label's first release, George Michael's Older album, had featured DreamWorks' more well-known logo of a boy fishing and sitting on a moon crescent. This moon logo has been used for non-music divisions of DreamWorks, and was later turned into a 25 second long CGI opening logo, when the main division DreamWorks Pictures began releasing films in late 1997.

Henry Rollins (both as a spoken-word artist and with Rollins Band), Alien Ant Farm, comedian/actor Chris Rock, Elliott Smith, Jimmy Eat World, Morphine, Nelly Furtado, Papa Roach, Powerman 5000, Sleepy Brown, rapper Swizz Beatz, Tamar Braxton and The All-American Rejects were among some of the notable acts signed to the label in the 1990s and early 2000s. Film composer Randy Newman was signed to the label as a composer of original non-film related music, although his film score work for DreamWorks Pictures films would later be released by the label as well. By the time the first DreamWorks Pictures film The Peacemaker was released on September 26, 1997, the label had released 12 albums by George Michael, Eels, Jonathan Larson, Powerman 5000, Morphine, Rollins Band, Chris Rock, Kool Keith, Forest for the Trees, Subcircus, Kim Fox and Hans Zimmer, with the Hans Zimmer album being a soundtrack score for The Peacemaker (released two weeks prior to the film). Jonathan Larson died in 1996 and was never officially signed to the label. The album of his that DreamWorks released consisted of cast recordings related to his gay-focused Broadway musical Rent. The album was successful for DreamWorks, and a second version would be released in 1999, titled The Best of Rent: Highlights from the Original Cast Album. Rent was eventually turned into a live-action film in 2005, although this film was released by Sony's Columbia Pictures, rather than by DreamWorks Pictures. Powerman 5000 had Rob Zombie's brother Spider One on vocals, and their DreamWorks debut Mega!! Kung Fu Radio was a reworked version of their independent debut The Blood-Splat Rating System, featuring a revised track listing and two new songs. Mega!! Kung Fu Radio was released on February 25, 1997, making them the first hard rock/metal act to release music for the label. The album had more of a funk and rap influence then their 1999 follow-up Tonight the Stars Revolt!, which is noted for its electronic-leaning sound. That album went platinum for sales of over 1 million copies, whilst Mega!! Kung Fu Radio had sold only 156,954 copies by November 2003. New York singer-songwriter Kim Fox was the first female artist signed to the label, and her debut Moon Hut was recorded with local musicians in Bloomington, Indiana, being released on September 9, 1997. It received positive reviews from critics for having a more experimental and irreverent approach to the female singer-songwriter genre, but was not commercially successful, with her subsequent album in 2003 being released independently.

In the lead up to the March 25, 1997 release of Rollins Band's DreamWorks debut Come In and Burn, lead singer Henry Rollins and DreamWorks Records had been involved in a lawsuit with Rollins Band's previous label Imago. At the time, the independent Imago had lost its distribution deal with major label BMG, leading Rollins to seek another label, with Rollins later being approached by David Geffen and other DreamWorks representatives to join their new label. Shortly after Rollins signed to DreamWorks, Imago president Terry Ellis filed a multi-million dollar lawsuit against both Rollins and DreamWorks, alleging breach of contract. Imago argued Rollins was still obligated to deliver more albums, under an eight-album deal Rollins Band had signed in 1991. Rollins countersued, claiming fraud and deceit on Imago's part. Rollins believed that the contract was no longer valid due to Imago's financial instability and loss of major label backing, saying that the label would soon go out of business. The lawsuit was still ongoing by the time Come In and Burn was released.

Once DreamWorks Pictures launched in September 1997, the label started doing soundtrack compilation tie-ins (usually with several songs from artists signed to their label), including for the DreamWorks films Almost Famous, American Beauty, Forces of Nature, Road Trip, Shrek, Small Soldiers and The Prince of Egypt. Additionally, between 1998 and 2000, the label released soundtrack compilations for three non-DreamWorks films; Dead Man on Campus, A Night at the Roxbury and The Ladies Man. All three of these films were comedies owned by Paramount Pictures, who later acquired the rights to the live-action DreamWorks film library in February 2006. The Dead Man on Campus soundtrack included songs from the DreamWorks artists Self, Propellerheads, Powerman 5000, Jonathan Fire*Eater and Creeper Lagoon, although the soundtracks for A Night at the Roxbury and The Ladies Man consisted of songs from non-DreamWorks artists. On September 8, 1998, the label released Songs of the Witchblade: A Soundtrack to the Comic Books, which, unlike typical soundtracks tied to film or television, was created specifically as a musical companion to the indie comic book Witchblade. The idea behind the project was to produce a set of songs that capture the mood, atmosphere, and character dynamics of the comic, functioning as a concept album that follows the tone and themes of Witchblade rather than telling a linear story. Kat Bjelland from Babes in Toyland (a non-DreamWorks act) was influential in putting the album together, as she was a fan of the comic. It featured only two songs by artists signed to DreamWorks; Kim Fox and Subcircus. On September 18, 2001, the label also released WWF Tough Enough: Music From the Hit Series, which was for the wrestling reality show of the same name. This compilation featured several songs from hard rock/metal artists signed to DreamWorks – including Alien Ant Farm, Buckcherry, Halfcocked, Papa Roach and Pressure 4-5 (who still had not released their debut Burning the Process yet). The show itself aired on MTV, which like Paramount was part of Viacom, and it had no corporate ties to the non-music divisions of DreamWorks.

In addition to using their songs on soundtrack albums, DreamWorks further promoted their musicians by using their songs within DreamWorks films. Two notable examples include the Oscar winning picture American Beauty, which featured the Eels' song "Cancer for the Cure" and Elliot Smith's song "Because", and DreamWorks' most successful release Shrek, which featured the Eels' song "My Beloved Monster" and the Self song "Stay Home". Eels' music also appeared in the DreamWorks films Road Trip and Shrek 2, while Smith's music additionally appeared in Almost Famous. Other DreamWorks films with songs from artists signed to their label included Evolution (which used songs from Buckcherry, Powerman 5000 and Self). Small Soldiers used Edwin Starr's 1970 song "War", while the soundtrack album released by DreamWorks Records featured a cover of "War" by Henry Rollins. He did this cover as part of a collaboration with Bone Thugs-n-Harmony and other musicians, rather than as part of Rollins Band. In Small Soldiers, there is also a scene in the protagonist's bedroom which shows a poster for Powerman 5000's Mega!! Kung Fu Radio.

After releasing The Peacemaker score in 1997, the label would occasionally release other background scores for DreamWorks films, including Randy Newman's score for Meet the Parents, Thomas Newman's score for American Beauty, Harry Gregson-Williams' score for Sinbad: Legend of the Seven Seas and John Williams' scores for Amistad, Catch Me If You Can, Minority Report and Saving Private Ryan. American Beauty was the only film to receive both a soundtrack score album and a soundtrack compilation album with songs from various artists. Certain DreamWorks scores were released by outside labels, starting with Mouse Hunt, which had its score released by Varèse Sarabande on December 2, 1997.

When DreamWorks Records initially formed, David Geffen speculated that it might be able to form synergies with DreamWorks' video game division DreamWorks Interactive. That division itself was expected to gradually form synergies with the film and television divisions, which had not launched yet at that point. Regarding DreamWorks Interactive, Geffen said at the time, "we don't really know what the effect of interactivity will be on music." One of the label's earliest releases, Rollins Band's Come In and Burn, had an enhanced CD version, which included a feature titled "Rollins Band Interactive". By 1998, the DreamWorks Records website was an interactive multimedia platform with dedicated micro-sites for the label's albums. These micro-sites feature interactive album art, incorporating music tracks, lyrics, visual elements, and animations to reflect the recording's style. The interface facilitated browsing through an album "bin" for new releases or a searchable discography. Selecting an album transformed the screen into a display for the artist, with full-screen visuals, promotional content, videos, and music presented in a maximized browser window. Users could select from three audio formats, and music videos were available for on-demand streaming. Albums which had their own micro-sites included Blinker the Star's August Everywhere, Buckcherry's self-titled album, Chris Rock's Bigger & Blacker, Dr. Octagon's Dr. Octagonecologyst, Kim Fox's Moon Hut, Powerman 5000's Tonight The Stars Revolt!, Propellerheads' Decksandrumsandrockandroll, Randy Newman's Bad Love, Rollins Band's Come In and Burn, Rufus Wainwright's self-titled album, Self's Breakfast with Girls, and the soundtrack for Forces of Nature.

=== Commercial successes and disappointments ===
Geffen Records distributed DreamWorks Records until 1999, when Interscope Records took over distribution duties (meanwhile, as Interscope and Geffen switched international distribution to Polydor Records, DreamWorks Records followed suit). Some of the label's biggest hits came in 2000–2001, with Nelly Furtado's "I'm Like a Bird", Papa Roach's "Last Resort" and Alien Ant Farm's cover of Michael Jackson's "Smooth Criminal" being released during those years. These hit singles came from the albums Whoa, Nelly! (2000), Infest (2000), and ANThology (2001). Alien Ant Farm had another successful single in 2001 titled "Movies". It had an accompanying music video parodying several films, although none of these films were from DreamWorks Records's parent company DreamWorks Pictures, which at that point had only been releasing films for 4 years. Papa Roach signed to DreamWorks in 1999, after releasing an independent album in 1997 titled Old Friends from Young Years, with Warner Bros. Records initially expressing interest in signing them. Papa Roach were friends with fellow insect-named Californian band Alien Ant Farm, and both were influenced by similar artists such as Faith No More. Papa Roach made a promise that if one band got successful, they would bring the other one along for the ride. Once Papa Roach achieved popularity on DreamWorks in 2000, they hand-picked Alien Ant Farm as the first signing for their own DreamWorks-imprint New Noize. In March 2001, Alien Ant Farm's singer Dryden Mitchell said that in spite of their connections, the two bands had very different sounds, believing that Papa Roach were more of a rap rock band. The Vancouver Island-born Furtado signed to DreamWorks in 1999, after being discovered at a Toronto talent showcase in June 1997. Despite the success of these three artists and their breakout hits in 2000–2001, their follow-up albums were less commercially successful. Furtado's 2003 album Folklore went Gold, but sold significantly less than her multi-platinum debut, Whoa, Nelly!. Similarly, Papa Roach's 2002 album, Lovehatetragedy, while reaching Gold status, did not come close to the commercial heights of their 3× platinum breakthrough, Infest. Alien Ant Farm's TruANT (2003) also sold considerably less than their platinum-certified album, ANThology. The lead up to the making of this album was marred by a major bus accident in Spain on May 22, 2002, which the members eventually recovered from. The accident killed the bus driver and left all four of Alien Ant Farm's members with bone-related injuries, with Dryden Mitchell suffering a serious spinal cord injury.

Anyone for Doomsday?, the follow-up to Powerman 5000's platinum selling Tonight the Stars Revolt! (1999), was planned to be released on August 28, 2001, and had a single released to radio stations in the lead up, "Bombshell". However, DreamWorks abruptly canceled the album's release just before its scheduled debut, and a large number of the manufactured copies were destroyed. Anyone for Doomsday? was eventually released online under Spider One's own label, Megatronic Records. The primary reason it was pulled in 2001, as stated by Spider One himself, was that he felt the album sounded too much like its predecessor, Tonight the Stars Revolt!. After the success of that album, he wanted to release something fresh and different, rather than just repeating the same formula. The album was completed and ready to be released, but Spider One made the last-minute decision to pull it and go back to the studio to record new material. There is an inaccurate rumor that the album was canceled due to the September 11 attacks, with the album title and songs like "Bombshell" potentially being offensive. The decision to cancel was already made in mid-August, prior to the attacks. An album confirmed to have been impacted by the event was Bleed American, the DreamWorks debut of Jimmy Eat World, released on July 24, 2001. Following the attacks, it had its title changed to Jimmy Eat World on future pressings. Jimmy Eat World remained its official title until April 2008, when a new deluxe edition was released.

While initially one of their most high-profile signings, both of Rollins Band's releases on DreamWorks, Come In and Burn (1997) and Get Some Go Again (2000), were commercial failures, with Come In and Burn selling only 96,000 units, less than its 1994 predecessor Weight, which sold 423,000 units on the independent Imago Records, and which had the minor hit single "Liar". Henry Rollins' 1998 spoken-word album Think Tank also flew under the radar when released by DreamWorks. In 1997, Michael Ostin of DreamWorks told Billboard that the label wanted to sign Rollins due to his "multidimensional" appeal of being not only a musician but also a spoken-word artist and an author. Rollins later said that the label "lost money" on him, and he ended up releasing Rollins Band's final album, 2001's Nice, on the hard rock/metal specialty label Sanctuary Records.

=== Sale and closure ===
It was announced on November 11, 2003, that Universal Music Group (the former MCA Music Entertainment, and parent of Interscope, Geffen, and Polydor) reached an agreement to acquire DreamWorks Records from DreamWorks for "about $100 million". The purchase came at a time when the music business was "going through major changes" as it struggled to "counter falling sales and the impact of unofficial online music sales". Mo Ostin, the principal executive at DreamWorks Records, said: "Despite the challenges of the music business today, Universal is acquiring a wonderful asset and the sale will assure the strongest possible future for our artists". Under the deal, DreamWorks Records was placed within the Interscope Geffen A&M division of UMG, under the direction of Jimmy Iovine. Notably, the label's A&R staff were kept on to the label. Polly Anthony joined Jordan Schur as Geffen co-head in 2004. After the finalisation of the label's sale to UMG on January 9, 2004, 100 employees were laid off at DreamWorks, multiple bands were dropped, and several albums were cancelled. DreamWorks' more commercially successful artists were assigned to new labels within the Interscope Geffen A&M division, with artists such as Alien Ant Farm, Jimmy Eat World, Nelly Furtado, Papa Roach and The All-American Rejects continuing to release albums for the division after 2005.

Despite having a platinum album in 1999, Powerman 5000 were not among the DreamWorks artists picked up by UMG. This was because their follow-up to the cancelled Anyone for Doomsday?, Transform (2003), sold only 148,561 copies, which led to DreamWorks dropping them around the time the 2003 sale was announced. Self's fifth studio album, Ornament & Crime (2017) was originally set to be released by DreamWorks in late 2003, but was delayed and completed on January 8, 2004, a day before the acquisition was completed. Due to the low sales of Self's previous DreamWorks release Breakfast with Girls (1999), executives believed the album would be a commercial failure, cancelling its release and leaving the album shelved, dropping the band shortly afterwards. The All-American Rejects and Nelly Furtado were two of the longest lasting DreamWorks artists at the Interscope Geffen A&M division, with their final releases coming in 2012. Furtado created her own Canadian label Nelstar in 2009, and it handled some of her post-2012 releases.

DreamWorks' country music division, DreamWorks Nashville, which began in June 1997, remained operational until September 1, 2005. It was shut down by Universal Music Group Nashville following the departure of the label's biggest star, Toby Keith.

The sale to Universal Music Group was part of a broader restructuring of DreamWorks' operations, starting in 2000 when their video game division DreamWorks Interactive was sold to Electronic Arts to $10 million. In October 2004, their animation division DreamWorks Animation split into its own separate company, while in February 2006, the live-action film and television divisions were sold to Paramount's parent company Viacom for $1.6 billion. Following the 2006 sale, Paramount Pictures entered into a six-year distribution agreement with DreamWorks Animation, although no similar deals were made with DreamWorks Records' new owner Universal Music Group, as they had already shut down the label by that point. Like DreamWorks Animation, Universal Music Group were involved in a recent split from a larger corporation they were part of, as in May 2004, they split from namesake company Universal Studios. In 2016, DreamWorks Animation ended up being purchased by Universal Studios' parent company Comcast for $3.8 billion. However, Universal Music Group has still remained a separate corporate entity to Universal Studios since 2004.

Following the 2003 announcement of UMG's takeover of DreamWorks Records, the label only released two further soundtrack albums for DreamWorks films; the soundtracks for the 2004 animated films Shrek 2 and Shark Tale (both of which were released before DreamWorks Animation split from the live-action divisions in October of that year). All other DreamWorks films released between November 2003 and September 2005 had their soundtracks released by other labels, including EuroTrip, Just like Heaven and Win a Date with Tad Hamilton!, among others. Win a Date with Tad Hamilton! had the song "Telling You Now" from recently signed DreamWorks artist Jessy Moss (originally from Australia), in addition to featuring her in an acting role. This was done to cross-promote Moss, with the film originally being shot between May and July 2003. The film ended up being released in January 2004, once UMG's takeover had been announced. In the credits of that film, Moss's song is listed as being under license from Universal Music, as the rights to her DreamWorks debut Street Knuckles (2003) had already been transferred to the company by that point. Along with "Telling You Now", the song "This is Love" from Self is heard in the movie's trailers, it was not featured in the movie nor its soundtrack as they had been dropped from the label shortly after its acquisition. The song "Move Along", by former DreamWorks artist The All-American Rejects, was used in the 2006 DreamWorks film She's the Man, which was the live-action division's first release under its new Paramount ownership. On September 14, 2004, a soundtrack album was released for Freaks and Geeks, a series produced by DreamWorks' television division DreamWorks Television. This release was handled by Shout! Factory, in association with DreamWorks Television. It had no involvement from the soon-to-be-closed DreamWorks Records, which, throughout its history, released only one soundtrack album for a DreamWorks Television property — that being the 2002 Steven Spielberg series Taken. On February 22, 2005, Henry Rollins released an expanded 2-disc edition of Come In and Burn, via his own 2.13.61 label. Up until 2023, the original 1997 version of Come In and Burn was not available on Spotify, due to complications with Rollins and DreamWorks Records' later owner Universal Music Group. However, the Come In and Burn Sessions version was available on Spotify in certain regions prior to 2023. Unlike with Rollins Band's other albums, neither Come In and Burn nor Get Some Go Again have ever been released on vinyl. Other albums experienced similar rights issues due to the DreamWorks Records sale, including Kim Fox's album Moon Hut, which was not available on Spotify until 2021.

Since the label's 2005 closure, some DreamWorks films have received new soundtrack albums by non-UMG labels. DreamWorks' first film The Peacemaker received an expanded score album from La-La Land Records on May 20, 2014, with this release being done in association with UMG. The original 1997 DreamWorks Records release of this album featured only 5 tracks, whereas the expanded edition had 25 tracks. On July 24, 2023, Mouse Hunt also received an expanded 44 track album from Varèse Sarabande, who handled the original 1997 album. This release was not done in association with UMG, but rather with the film's current owner Paramount Pictures. Paramount's own in-house label Paramount Music has occasionally released soundtracks for their older library titles, but so far have not created any new soundtrack releases for the live-action DreamWorks titles they acquired in 2006, including the titles which did not originally have albums released by DreamWorks Records or other labels. Music videos released for DreamWorks Records artists were copyrighted to "DreamWorks Records, Inc.", whereas live-action films and television shows were copyrighted to "DreamWorks LLC", suggesting that the rights to these music videos are currently with Universal Music Group rather than Paramount Pictures.

== DreamWorks Nashville ==
Between 1997 and 2005, DreamWorks operated a division in Nashville, Tennessee for country music acts. Among the artists signed to the DreamWorks Nashville division were Jessica Andrews, Emerson Drive, Toby Keith, Mike Walker, Randy Travis, Jimmy Wayne, and Darryl Worley. Their first release was You and You Alone, by Randy Travis, who was formerly signed to Warner Bros. Records. The division released one soundtrack album during its lifespan; for The Prince of Egypt. This film had two other soundtrack releases on the main DreamWorks Records label; one focusing on songs from R&B/pop artists and the other focusing on songs from Christian/gospel artists The final release by DreamWorks Nashville was Hanna–McEuen's self-titled album, on August 16, 2005. This was also the final release under any DreamWorks-branded record label.

After DreamWorks Records' dissolution, former executive Scott Borchetta formed Big Machine Records in late 2005, signing several country music acts to the label. Borchetta also signed Show Dog Records in partnership with Toby Keith, although Keith dropped his association with the latter label in 2005. Meanwhile, Borchetta signed Taylor Swift to Big Machine Records. The latter label merged with Universal South Records to become Show Dog-Universal Music.

== See also ==
- DreamWorks Records discography
- Geffen Records
- Paramount Music
- Paramount Records
- List of DreamWorks Records artists
- Lists of record labels
