= Builders of the Future =

Studio album by Powerman 5000
- Released: May 27, 2014
- Recorded: 2014 at The Emergency Room
- Genres: Electronic rock; industrial rock
- Length: 34:20
- Labels: T-Boy Records, UMe
- Producers: Evan Rodaniche, Spider One

Powerman 5000 chronology
Copies, Clones & Replicants (2011)	Builders of the Future (2014)	New Wave (2017)

Singles from Builders of the Future
- 1. "How to Be a Human" Released: April 22, 2014; 2. "Invade, Destroy, Repeat" Released: May 20, 2014

Builders of the Future is the eighth studio album by American rock band Powerman 5000. Produced by Evan Rodaniche, Spider One and Nick Quijano, it was released on May 27, 2014, and is the first composition that the band released through T-Boy Records and Universal Music Enterprises. The album became available for preorder starting March 25, 2014. The album sold around 4,200 copies in its first week of release, while debuting at position No. 63 on the Billboard 200 chart.

== Reception ==
In their review, Blabbermouth.net gave Builders of the Future a rating of 7.5 out of 10, saying the album is "primarily about chasing an adrenaline rush".

== Track listing ==
All lyrics are written by Spider One.

No.	Title	Music	Length
1.	"Invade, Destroy, Repeat"	Spider One, Nick Quijano, Rodaniche	2:56
2.	"We Want It All"	Spider One, Nick Quijano, Rodaniche	2:41
3.	"How to Be a Human"	Spider One, Pino	3:27
4.	"You're Gonna Love It, If You Like It or Not"	Spider One, Nick Quijano, Rodaniche	3:22
5.	"Builders of the Future"	Spider One, Rodaniche	3:36
6.	"I Want to Kill You"	Spider One, Rodaniche	4:41
7.	"Modern World"	Spider One, Nick Quijano, Rodaniche	2:53
8.	"Live It Up Before You're Dead"	Spider One, Rodaniche	3:01
9.	"I Can't Fucking Hear You"	Spider One, Rodaniche	4:44
10.	"Evil World"	Spider One, Rodaniche	2:55
Total length:			27:56

Best Buy special edition bonus tracks
No.	Title	Music	Length
11.	"Heads Will Roll"	Spider One, Rodaniche	3:00
12.	"Hey, All You People"	Spider One, Rodaniche	3:24
Total length:			34:20

== Personnel ==
Band members

- Spider One – vocals
- Nick Quijano – guitars
- Gustavo Aued – bass
- Adrian Ost – drums

Additional musicians

- Evan Rodaniche – additional guitar
- DJ Rattan – additional drums

Production

- Evan Rodaniche, Spider One – producers
- Evan Rodaniche – engineers, mixing
- Mister Sa Shearon – album artwork

== Charts ==
Chart (2014)	Peak position
US Billboard 200	63
US Top Rock Albums	16
US Modern Rock/Alternative Albums	12
US Top Hard Rock Albums	2

=== Singles ===
Year	Single	Chart	Position
2014	"How to Be a Human"	US Mainstream Rock	23
