= Hanna–McEuen (album) =

Studio album by Hanna–McEuen
- Released: August 16, 2005
- Genre: Neotraditional country, country rock
- Label: DreamWorks Nashville
- Producer: James Stroud and Hanna–McEuen

Hanna–McEuen is the only studio album by American country music duo Hanna–McEuen. It was released on August 16, 2005, by DreamWorks Nashville. The album charted at number 42 on Top Country Albums and included the single "Something Like a Broken Heart", which peaked at number 38 on Hot Country Songs. However the duo also recorded a DVD-Audio/Video project titled "Tried and True" in 2007 for AIX Records, which featured a guest appearance by country guitarist Albert Lee. It was the last album released by DreamWorks Nashville, with its non-country parent label DreamWorks Records having already shut down the previous year.

== Critical reception ==
It received positive reviews. Stephen Thomas Erlewine of Allmusic called it "one of the best debuts of 2005" and cited the duo's country rock and alternative country influences, rating it four-and-a-half stars out of five. Entertainment Weekly reviewer Chris Willman gave a B+, comparing its sound to The Mavericks and calling it "an euphonic, often euphoric alternative." Jack Lowe of About.com gave it five stars, saying that it was "very smooth and fun to listen to."

== Track listing ==
| No. | Title | Writer(s) | Length |
|---|---|---|---|
| 1. | "Fool Around" | Jaime Hanna, Alan Miller | 3:22 |
| 2. | "Blue Sunrise" | Hanna, Charles English, Miller | 3:34 |
| 3. | "Read Between the Lies" | Hanna, Jonathan McEuen, Miller | 3:30 |
| 4. | "Something Like a Broken Heart" | Hanna, Robert Reynolds, Miller | 3:52 |
| 5. | "The End of Me" | Hanna, Dennis Britt, Miller | 2:32 |
| 6. | "Wild Eyes of Love" | Hanna, Miller, Angelo Petraglia | 2:54 |
| 7. | "Prayer for You" | Jessie Siebenberg, McEuen | 3:45 |
| 8. | "Is It Only Me" | Hanna, Don Schlitz | 3:54 |
| 9. | "Someone Else" | Hanna, Miller | 4:03 |
| 10. | "Tell Me" | Hanna, Raul Malo, Miller | 3:13 |
| 11. | "Rock and a Heartache" | Hanna, Britt, Miller | 3:24 |
| 12. | "Ocean" | Jimmy Adams, McEuen | 4:07 |

== Personnel ==
As listed in liner notes.

=== Hanna–McEuen ===
- Jaime Hanna – acoustic guitar, electric guitar, baritone guitar, mandolin, harmonica, vocals
- Jonathan McEuen – acoustic guitar, electric guitar, resonator guitar, mandolin, banjo, vocals

=== Additional musicians ===
- Dan Dugmore – pedal steel guitar
- Kenny Greenberg – electric guitar
- Greg Morrow – drums
- Gordon Mote – piano, keyboards, Hammond B-3 organ
- Phil Salazar – fiddle (track 12)
- Gabe Witcher – fiddle (tracks 3, 6, 7, 12)
- Glenn Worf – bass guitar

== Chart performance ==
| Chart (2005) | Peak position |
|---|---|
| U.S. Billboard Top Country Albums | 42 |
