= Transform (Powerman 5000 album) =

Studio album by Powerman 5000
- Released: May 20, 2003
- Studio: Mad Dog Studios (Burbank, California); Cello Studios (Hollywood, California); QI Lab Studios (Los Angeles, California)
- Genre: Punk rock; alternative metal; industrial metal
- Length: 45:35
- Label: DreamWorks
- Producer: Joe Barresi and Powerman 5000

Powerman 5000 chronology
Anyone for Doomsday? (2001)	Transform (2003)	The Good, the Bad and the Ugly Vol. 1 (2004)

Singles from Transform
- 1. "Free" Released: March 25, 2003; 2. "Action" Released: August 5, 2003

Professional ratings
Review scores
Source	Rating
AllMusic	2.5/5 stars
Rolling Stone	3/5 stars
KNAC	5/5 stars

Transform is the fourth studio album by American rock band Powerman 5000, released May 20, 2003. It is an enhanced CD that includes the videos for "Free" and "Action", the album's two singles.

== Musical and visual style ==
Transform marked, both musically and visually, an obvious change from Powerman 5000's previous science fiction theme. Recording began in July 2002 and saw the band composed songs in a simpler, more straightforward manner with less emphasis on industrial metal and nu metal elements and heaviness. The video for its lead single, "Free", also demonstrated the band's visual stylistic detour in which, rather than space costumes, the majority of band members are dressed in denim while performing in a red room covered in graffiti, creating a colorful, punk rock influenced edge.

The album artwork contains symbols reminiscent of the Amphisbaena. Adorning the CD artwork are four two-headed arrows wrapped back pointing at each other, the outermost one sprouting two extra arrows for a total of six on the right, and underneath the CD are two worm like creatures face to face forming a circle.

== Commercial performance ==
The album sold 39,000 copies in its first week to chart at #27 on the Billboard 200. It stayed on the chart for 9 weeks. The album had sold 148,561 copies in the U.S. before the band was dropped from DreamWorks Records in December of that year.

== Tour ==
In support of the album, the band announced they would begin touring through the U.S. in April, along with Stone Sour and Ra. They would also go on to appear as the musical guest on Jimmy Kimmel Live! (where they performed their song "Action"), and The Late Late Show (where they performed their song "Free"), respectfully. The band would also later begin to embark on a headlining tour along with Mudvayne and V Shape Mind, starting in September and performing in festivals such as X-Fest.

However, when DreamWorks Records was bought out by Interscope Records, the label pulled their touring support for Powerman 5000 in the middle of the tour, forcing the band to withdraw from their tour.

== In other media ==
- "Action" featured on NASCAR Thunder 2004 and was used as its introductory screen's theme.
- "Transform" was featured in Midway Entertainment's hockey game NHL Hitz Pro.
- "Free" was featured on the New Jersey Devils 2003 Stanley Cup Championship video.

== Track listing ==
All tracks are written by Powerman 5000, all lyrics by Spider One.

No.	Title	Length
1.	"Assess the Mess" (spoken word by John A. Williams)	0:32
2.	"Theme to a Fake Revolution"	3:25
3.	"Free"	3:50
4.	"Action"	3:38
5.	"That's Entertainment"	3:17
6.	"A Is for Apathy"	4:16
7.	"Transform"	4:04
8.	"Top of the World"	3:34
9.	"Song About Nuthin'"	3:56
10.	"Stereotype"	3:48
11.	"I Knew It"	3:35
12.	"Hey, That's Right!"	3:58
13.	"The Shape of Things to Come"	3:37
Total length:		45:35

== Personnel ==
- Spider One – vocals
- Mike "M.33" Tempesta – guitar
- Adam "12" Williams – guitar, additional programming, additional production, additional recording, additional editing
- Siggy "00" Siursen – bass
- Adrian "ad" Ost – drums
- Trixie Starr – additional vocals on "That's Entertainment"

Production

- Joe Barresi – producer, recording
- Dan Leffler – assistant engineer
- Scott Oyster – assistant engineer
- Chris Ohno – assistant engineer
- Chris Lord–Alge – mixing
- Dan Druff – guitar tech
- Bruce Jacoby – drum tech
- Mauro Rubb – drum tech
- Ron Handler – A&R

== Chart positions ==
Album – Billboard (United States)

Year	Chart	Position
2003	Billboard 200	27

Singles – Billboard (United States)

Year	Single	Chart	Position
2003	"Free"	Mainstream Rock Tracks	10
2003	"Free"	Modern Rock Tracks	38
2003	"Action"	Mainstream Rock Tracks	27
