= The Blood-Splat Rating System =

Studio album by Powerman 5000
- Released: December 1, 1995
- Genre: Nu metal; funk metal
- Length: 40:47
- Label: Conscience
- Producer: Mudrock; Powerman 5000

Powerman 5000 chronology
True Force (1994)	The Blood-Splat Rating System (1995)	Tonight the Stars Revolt! (1999)

Singles from The Blood-Splat Rating System
- 1. "Tokyo Vigilante #1" Released: 1997; 2. "Organizized" Released: 1998

Mega!! Kung Fu Radio
- Reissue cover

Professional ratings
Review scores
Source	Rating
AllMusic	3/5 stars

The Blood-Splat Rating System is the debut studio album by the American rock band Powerman 5000. Released on December 1, 1995 through Conscience Records, it was the band's second independent release. The album was a local success in Boston, sold out its initial pressing and won three awards from the 1995 Boston Phoenix Readers' Poll, including "Best Metal Album", "Best Rap Album" and "Album of the Year". Its success led to a contract with the major label DreamWorks Records, who reissued the album under the title Mega!! Kung Fu Radio on February 25, 1997. It had sold 156,954 copies by 2003.

== Musical style ==
The album's musical style incorporates elements of heavy metal, funk, hard rock, and rap. According to AllMusic's Chris Slawecki, vocalist Spider One "doesn't sing one single lyric, instead barking out the lyrics in a hard staccato delivery."

== Track listing ==
The Blood-Splat Rating System track listing
No.	Title	Length
1.	"Public Menace, Freak, Human Fly"	3:38
2.	"Neckbone"	4:00
3.	"Car Crash"	2:42
4.	"Earth vs. Me"	3:20
5.	"A Swim with the Sharks"	3:28
6.	"Tokyo Vigilante #1"	3:00
7.	"Organizized"	3:56
8.	"Boredwitcha"	2:50
9.	"Standing 8"	3:44
10.	"Even Superman Shot Himself"	10:09
Total length:		40:47

Note

Mega!! Kung Fu Radio track listing
No.	Title	Length
1.	"Public Menace, Freak, Human Fly"	3:38
2.	"Organizized"	3:55
3.	"Neckbone"	4:00
4.	"Car Crash"	2:42
5.	"Earth vs. Me"	3:20
6.	"A Swim with the Sharks"	3:20
7.	"20 Miles to Texas 25 to Hell"	3:16
8.	"Mega!! Kung Fu Radio"	3:38
9.	"Tokyo Vigilante #1"	2:59
10.	"Boredwitcha"	2:50
11.	"Standing 8"	3:35
12.	"Even Superman Shot Himself"	5:42
13.	"File Under Action" (hidden track)	4:20
Total length:		47:15

== Personnel ==
Credits taken from the CD liner notes.

Powerman 5000

- Spider – vocals
- Adam 12 – guitar
- Dorian – bass
- Jordan – percussion
- Allan – drums

Technical

- Mudrock – production, mixing
- Chris Shaw – mixing
- Dan McLaughlin – assistant engineering
- Scott Young – assistant engineering
- Roger Lian – mastering
