= The Good, the Bad and the Ugly Vol. 1 =

The Good, the Bad and the Ugly, Vol. 1

Compilation album by Powerman 5000
- Released: October 24, 2004
- Recorded: 1991–1996
- Length: 67:34
- Label: Megatronic

Powerman 5000 chronology
Transform (2003)	The Good, the Bad and the Ugly, Vol. 1 (2004)	Korea Tour EP (2005)

Professional ratings
Review scores
Source	Rating
AllMusic	3/5 stars

The Good, the Bad and the Ugly, Vol. 1: Rare & Previously Unreleased '91–'96 is a compilation album by American rock band Powerman 5000, released in 2004. It contains rare and unreleased tracks from the band's early days. The album sold around 340 copies in the first week of its release.

== Track listing ==
1. "B.S. One" - 0:54
2. "City of the Dead" - 3:13
3. "Slumlord" - 3:39
4. "Even Superman Shot Himself (Original '91 Version)" - 4:41
5. "B.S. Two" - 0:32
6. "Boredwitcha" - 3:59
7. "In the Eye" - 3:07
8. "Earth vs. Me (Original Version)" - 4:42
9. "Put the Hammer Down" - 3:30
10. "Solid" - 2:56
11. "End" - 4:04
12. "B.S. Three" - 0:38
13. "File Under Action (Original Version)" - 3:43
14. "Army of Me" - 3:41
15. "Solid (Alternate Version)" - 3:40
16. "Player Re-mixx" - 2:39
17. "20 Miles to Texas, 25 to Hell [Live]" - 3:36
18. "Strike the Match [Live]" - 3:50
19. "What If? [Live]" - 5:24
20. "Organizized [Live]" - 5:06

Tracks 17–20 are bonus tracks from a live college radio broadcast.

This album is a general compilation of Powerman 5000 songs through 1991 to 1996, and showcases a wider range of musical styles than was typical on subsequent records; Spider tended to rap as well as utilize harsh vocals, which created a more "raw" sound than on their other releases.
