= Somewhere on the Other Side of Nowhere =

Studio album by Powerman 5000
- Released: October 6, 2009
- Studio: The Emergency Room Studios (Los Angeles, California)
- Genre: Industrial metal
- Length: 33:51
- Label: Mighty Loud; Megatronic; Fontana
- Producer: Powerman 5000

Powerman 5000 chronology
Destroy What You Enjoy (2006)	Somewhere on the Other Side of Nowhere (2009)	Copies, Clones & Replicants (2011)

Singles from Somewhere on the Other Side of Nowhere
- 1. "Super Villain" Released: February 10, 2009; 2. "V Is for Vampire" Released: April 21, 2009; 3. "Show Me What You've Got" Released: March 23, 2010; 4. "Time Bomb, Baby" Released: December 21, 2010

Professional ratings
Review scores
Source	Rating
AllMusic	3.5/5 stars
411mania	5.5/10 stars
FEARnet	(favorable)

Somewhere on the Other Side of Nowhere is the sixth studio album by Powerman 5000 returning to their more traditional industrial metal sound, following their punk rock oriented 2006 album Destroy What You Enjoy. The album was released in the US on October 6, 2009 and in Canada on October 20. The album sold around 2,000 copies in its first week of release. The digital single for "Super Villain" has scanned around 15,000 paid downloads.

== History ==
On May 21, 2007, Powerman 5000 claimed via a MySpace blog post that they would be releasing a new studio album in 2007. The following is taken directly from said post: "Considering the band's track record of putting out cds once every three years it seems hard to believe that, yes we will put out a new disc in 2007!! It's all just beginning to develop and the wheres, whos and whats are to be determined but new rock is on the way!!" However no more details were released regarding the album and the album failed to meet a 2007 release as well as a 2008 release.

On January 28, a preview of tracks from Somewhere on the Other Side of Nowhere were posted on the group's MySpace page. The tracks for preview are entitled: "Super Villain," "V is for Vampire," and "Horror Show." Powerman 5000 posted that "Super Villain" would become available for digital purchase on February 10 via iTunes and Amazon.com. The release date was pushed back several times to a Spring release.

On April 21, the band released "V is for Vampire", the second single from Somewhere on the Other Side of Nowhere.

On July 7, 2009, Powerman 5000 released a blog on their Myspace page stating that the new album has been finished, and that a release date, track listing, artwork, and additional tour dates will be coming soon.

On July 27, 2009, Powerman 5000 appeared on Rockline, announcing the title of the new album as ' Somewhere on the Other Side of Nowhere'. A tentative release date of Oct. 6 was also announced. Three new songs were leaked on YouTube,"Timebomb", Make Us Insane", and "Show Me What You Got". The songs have since been removed from the site due to copyright restrictions. On Myspace Spider posted a blog talking about the three leaked songs filled with comments of the fans liking the music.

On September 6, 2009, Powerman 5000 released the album cover design along with the promotion of their upcoming tour starting on October 24. They have also released two new promotional videos on YouTube Video on YouTube Video on YouTube for their new album, confirming its release date as October 6.

In early 2011, it was announced that the Rock Band Network authoring group "That Authoring Group" is currently working on six songs from Somewhere on the Other Side of Nowhere as playable tracks via the Rock Band Network for Rock Band 3 on Xbox 360. Singles "Show Me What You've Got" and "V Is for Vampire" have since been released on the Xbox 360, and Show Me What You've Got has also been released on the PlayStation 3. The songs "Do Your Thing", "Time Bomb", "Super Villain", and "Get Your Bones" are listed as "in production" with no specific release date given yet.

== Singles ==
1. "Super Villain"
2. "V Is for Vampire"
3. "Show Me What You've Got"
4. "Time Bomb, Baby"

== Track listing ==
All tracks written by Powerman 5000.

No.	Title	Length
1.	"Intelligent Creatures"	0:34
2.	"Show Me What You've Got"	2:56
3.	"Super Villain"	3:45
4.	"V Is for Vampire"	3:20
5.	"Do Your Thing"	3:26
6.	"Somewhere on the Other Side of Nowhere"	3:16
7.	"Time Bomb, Baby"	3:27
8.	"Get Your Bones"	3:44
9.	"Make Us Insane"	3:42
10.	"Technology Eats Its Young"	1:13
11.	"Horror Show"	4:20

- "Horror Show" ends at 3:14. After 1:02 seconds of a low vibrating soundwave, the words "help us" are said at 4:16.
- The songs "Intelligent Creatures", "V Is for Vampire", "Technology Eats Its Young" and "Horror Show" all contain sound bites from the film Planet of the Vampires.
