= Anyone for Doomsday? =

Studio album by Powerman 5000
- Released: August 28, 2001 (scheduled release date)
- Studio: NRG (North Hollywood, California); Larrabee (North Hollywood, California)
- Genre: Industrial metal; nu metal
- Length: 36:07
- Label: DreamWorks
- Producer: Terry Date; Ulrich Wild; Powerman 5000

Powerman 5000 chronology
Tonight the Stars Revolt! (1999)	Anyone for Doomsday? (2001)	Transform (2003)

Singles from Anyone for Doomsday?
- 1. "Bombshell" Released: July 10, 2001

Alternative covers
- Cover for the 2003 release

Professional ratings
Review scores
Source	Rating
AllMusic	3/5 stars
Rolling Stone	1.5/5 stars
Blabbermouth.net	7/10 stars

Anyone for Doomsday? is the third studio album by American rock band Powerman 5000. It was scheduled to be released on August 28, 2001, but was cancelled just weeks before its release. Originally, frontman Spider One claimed he was still writing songs for the album, and that the band's label, DreamWorks, was putting them under pressure to meet the album's deadline. Eventually, the album was scrapped, as Spider claimed it sounded too similar to their previous effort, Tonight the Stars Revolt!.

The track "Bombshell" was released as the only single from the album on July 10, 2001, peaking at no. 30 on Billboard's Mainstream Rock Tracks chart.

== Track listing ==
All lyrics are written by Spider One; all music is composed by Powerman 5000.

No.	Title	Length
1.	"Disease of Machinery"	0:37
2.	"Danger Is Go!"	3:05
3.	"Bombshell"	3:13
4.	"The Meaning of Life"	2:47
5.	"Tomorrow Is Yesterday"	3:07
6.	"The End of Everything"	3:09
7.	"What the World Does"	2:02
8.	"177-TR?"	0:21
9.	"The One and Only"	3:05
10.	"Wake Up"	3:17
11.	"Rise"	0:54
12.	"Megatronic"	2:38
13.	"The Future That Never Was"	5:27
Total length:		36:07

Notes

- "The Future That Never Was" ends at 4:35. After 30 seconds of silence (4:35–5:05), a hidden track starts; it's a strange transmission-like sound with some additional beats before cutting off completely.
- The original version of "Rise" can be found on demo versions of the album.
- "Disease of Machinery" is sometimes listed as "Machines for the Living" on the back.

== Personnel ==
Powerman 5000

- Adam 12 – guitar
- Al 3 – drums
- Dorian 27 – bass
- Spider One – vocals
- M.33 – guitar

Production

- Terry Date – producer
- Ulrich Wild – producer
- Ron Handler – A&R

== Charts ==
Singles - Billboard (United States)

Year	Single	Chart	Position
2001	"Bombshell"	Mainstream Rock	26
