= Mike Tempesta =

American guitarist

Mike Tempesta is an American rock guitarist and artist relations manager. He also goes by the moniker M.33. He was credited for rhythm guitar tech on the 1990 Anthrax album Persistence of Time and his guitar solo in their Album/Song "Stomp 442,"/"American Pompeii". Before his career as a musician, he was a guitar technician for Anthrax's Scott Ian. He was a member of Human Waste Project, and played rhythm and lead guitar in the band Powerman 5000 until his departure in 2004. He performed on the debut album of Scum of the Earth, once again with his brother John Tempesta, and has since left the lineup. After leaving Powerman 5000, he took up a job as an artist relations manager for Yamaha Corporation of America, but soon left and eventually was hired as an artist relations manager for Fender Musical Instruments Corporation, overseeing the Jackson, Charvel, and EVH brands.

A Schecter guitar was branded with his name.

== Discography ==
=== With Human Waste Project ===
- E-lux (1997)

=== With Powerman 5000 ===
- Tonight the Stars Revolt! (1999)
- Anyone for Doomsday? (2001)
- Transform (2003)

=== With Scum of the Earth ===
- Blah...Blah...Blah...Love Songs for the New Millennium (2004)
