= Powerman 5000 =

American rock band

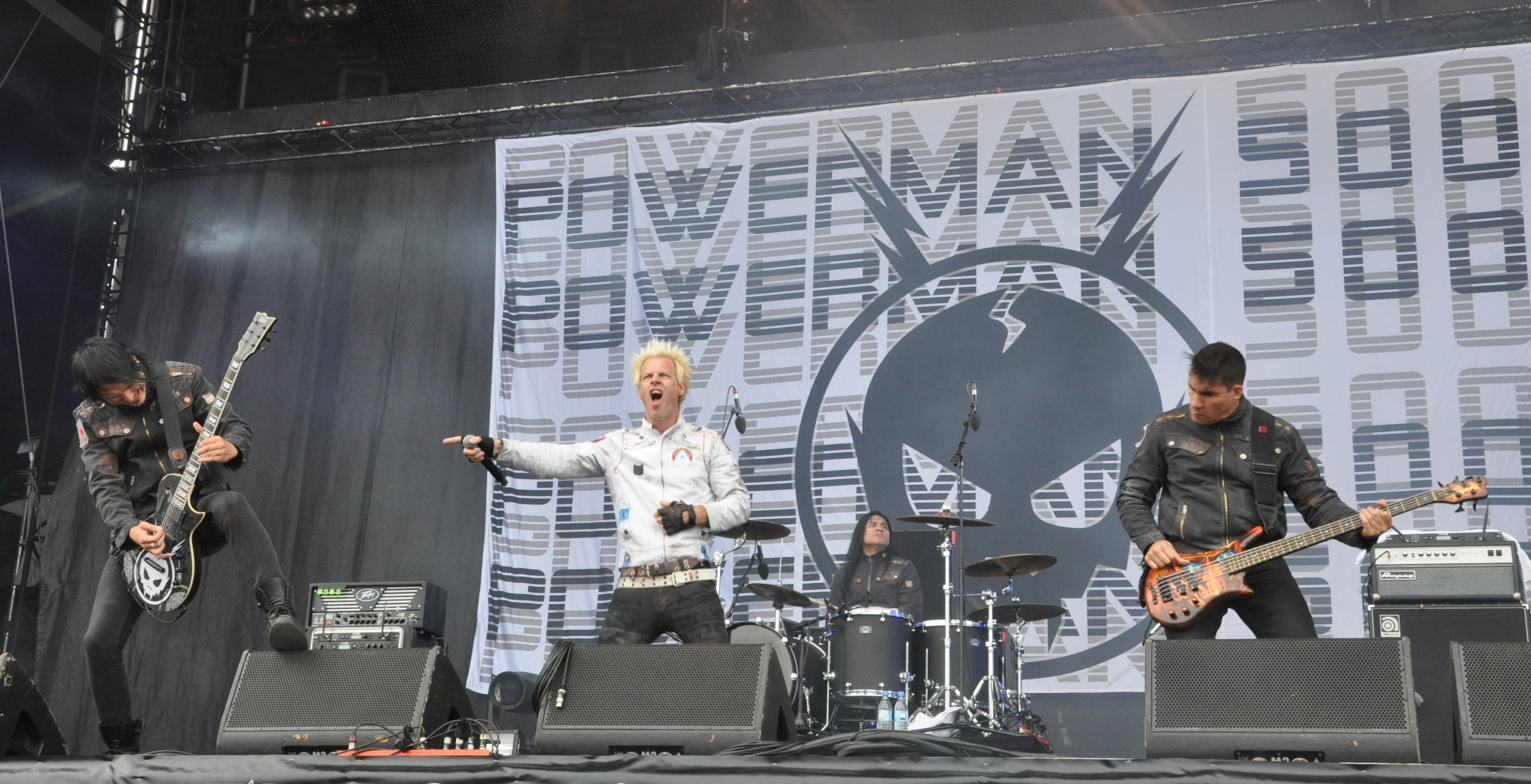
- Powerman 5000 performing at Rock am Ring in 2014

Background information
- Origin: Boston, Massachusetts, U.S.
- Genres: Industrial metal; nu metal; hard rock; alternative metal; electronic rock; punk rock
- Years active: 1991–present
- Labels: Pavement; T-Boy; Cleopatra; Mighty Loud; DRT; Megatronic; DreamWorks; Conscience; Curve of the Earth; Megaforce
- Members: Spider One; DJ Rattan; Taylor Haycraft; Dan Schiz; Evan9 (Evan Rodaniche)
- Past members: Adam 12 (Adam Williams); Al 3 (Allan Pahanish Jr.); DJ Brian Collymore; Dorian 27 (Dorian Heartsong); Jordan Cohen; M.33; Ad7 (Adrian Ost); Siggy 00 (Siggy Sjursen); Johnny Rock Heatley; Terry Corso; Velkro (Dave Pino); GFlash (Gordon Heckaman); X51 (Gustavo Aued); Nick Annis; Sci55ors (Nick Quijano); Zer0 (Richard Jazmin); Jesse Sauve; Ryan Hernandez; Erik Himel; Ty Oliver; Murv3 (Murv Douglas)
- Website: powerman5000.com

Powerman 5000, sometimes abbreviated PM5K, is an American rock band from Boston, Massachusetts. Founded in 1991, the group has released eleven studio albums, gaining its highest level of commercial success with 1999's Tonight the Stars Revolt!, which reached number 29 on the Billboard 200 while spawning the singles "When Worlds Collide" and "Nobody's Real". Frontman Spider One, younger brother of fellow musician Rob Zombie, has been the only consistent member of the lineup since the band's formation.

== Biography ==
=== Early years (1991–1998) ===
In 1990, Spider One recorded the 12" single "Much Evil" with producer Lamar Lowder. Building on local success, including winning the Boston Phoenix/WFNX 1990 Readers' Poll "Best Rap Act" category and getting nominated for a Boston Music Award, he founded Powerman 5000 in 1991. Drummer Al Pahanish Jr., bassist Dorian Heartsong, guitarist Adam 12, and percussionist Jordan Cohen joined in 1991 to solidify the early lineup (a turntablist, Brian Collymoore, was also briefly a member until 1993). In 1993, the band released an independent EP titled A Private Little War, which was limited to 500 copies and only sold at shows. In 1994 and 1995, Powerman 5000 released two more independent records, the True Force EP and the full-length album The Blood-Splat Rating System. Both albums were local successes. In 1996, they performed on the second stage of Ozzfest and appeared in an episode of Beverly Hills, 90210, where David and Donna filmed a music video for their song "Strike the Match".

In 1996, the band signed to DreamWorks Records and released a remastered edition of The Blood-Splat Rating System titled Mega!! Kung Fu Radio. The band toured, performing on the main stage at Ozzfest 1997 and making an appearance on Late Night with Conan O'Brien where they performed their song "Neckbone". They released singles such as "Tokyo Vigilante #1" in 1997 and "Organizized" in 1998. By the end of 1997, Cohen departed from the band to eventually join Blue Man Group. His percussionist position was not replaced; however, the band instead added a second guitarist to the lineup when M.33 (Mike Tempesta) joined the band in 1998.

=== Tonight the Stars Revolt! and Anyone for Doomsday? (1999-2002) ===
Creating an atypical fusion of science fiction and "Action Rock", Powerman 5000 released Tonight the Stars Revolt!, produced by Sylvia Massy, which contained the hit singles "When Worlds Collide", "Nobody's Real", and "Supernova Goes Pop". The album sold over one million copies, achieved platinum status, and won a nomination from the Boston Music Awards for "Album of the Year", becoming the group's most successful release. The band was also nominated by the Boston Music Awards for "Best Rock Band" and won the "Rising Star Award". The band would go on to tour worldwide, performing in shows and festivals such as Farmclub.com and Endfest and become a support act for Metallica's Summer Sanitarium Tour along with Korn, Kid Rock and System of a Down.

A follow-up album to Tonight the Stars Revolt! was recorded in 2001 titled Anyone for Doomsday?, and a single, "Bombshell", had been released to radio stations. Additionally, a variant of the "Bombshell" single contained the song "Danger Is Go!". The album was canceled just before its scheduled release, but was later released under Spider's own new label, Megatronic Records, finally going out of print due to legal issues. Arguments exist as to whether the record was canceled due to the events of the September 11 terrorist attacks and the negative title, but the album was finished and scheduled to be released in August 2001, one full month before the attacks. Spider has said in interviews that the album was dropped because it sounded too much like the previous album and that he wanted to release something fresh and different instead of repeating himself. Conflicts thereafter caused longtime members Dorian 27 (Dorian Heartsong) and AL3 (Allan Pahanish Jr) to leave the band. Siggy Sjursen and Ad7 (Adrian Ost) were brought in to replace them.

The band gained significant mainstream exposure with its original remake of the 1980s club hit "Relax", originally by Frankie Goes To Hollywood. Rapper Danny Boy guested, and the track was featured prominently during the end credits roll for the 2001 comedy film Zoolander, helping to widen the band's appeal.

=== Transform and Destroy What You Enjoy (2003–2007) ===
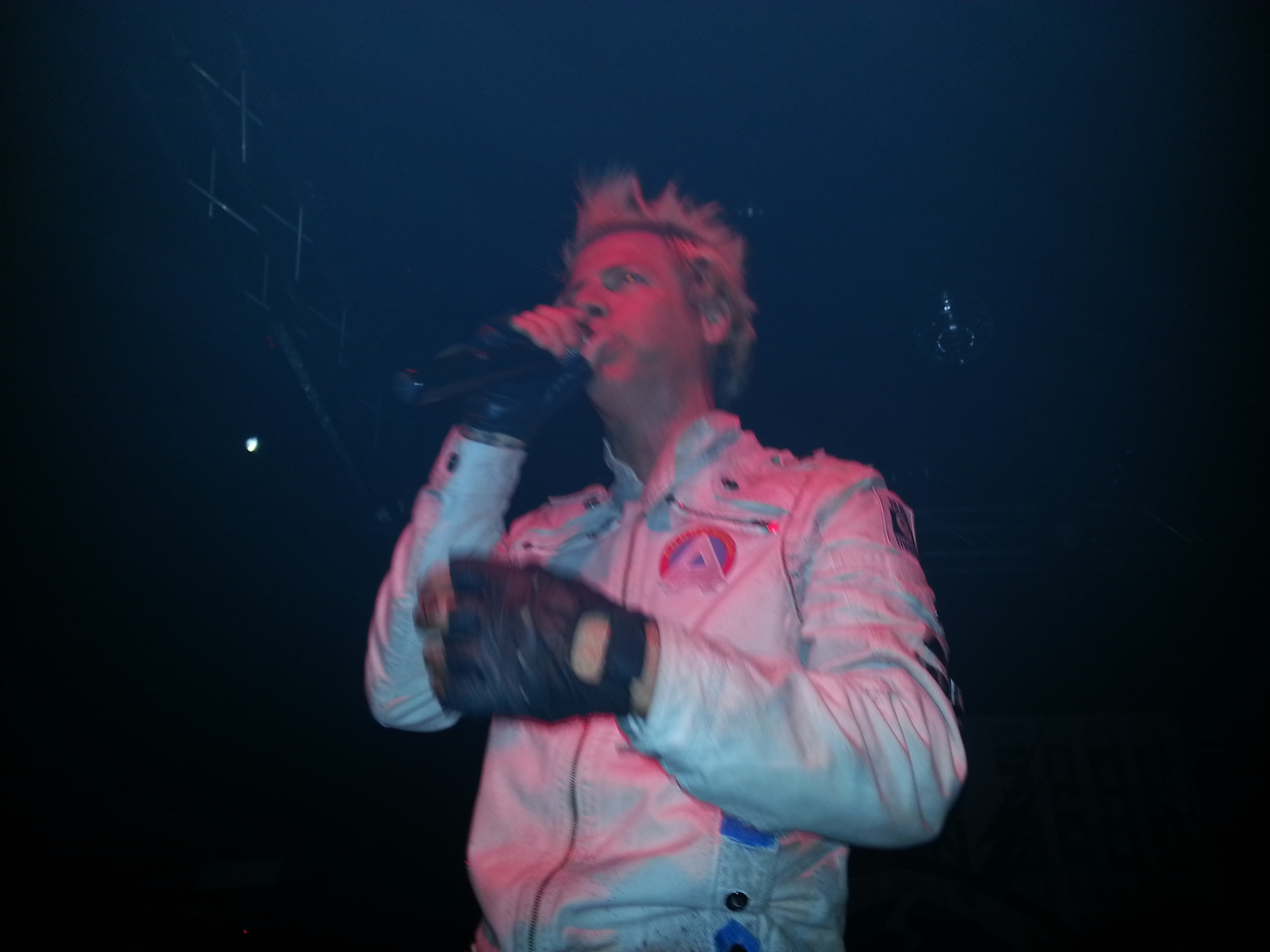
Spider One

In 2003, the band released Transform, a more punk-fueled album, completely dropping the costumes that had been featured throughout the band's Tonight The Stars Revolt! era. Containing the hit singles "Free" and "Action", Transform relied less on industrial metal effects. After the album's release, the band began touring in the U.S., performing in shows such as X-Fest and making live appearances on Jimmy Kimmel Live! where they performed their song "Action", and The Late Late Show where they performed their song "Free" respectively. However, DreamWorks Records was bought out by Interscope Records, which stopped promoting the band and declined to take over their DreamWorks contract. Undeterred, Spider continued with his own offshoot label, Megatronic Records. In 2004, new music was released, under Spider's new label, in the form of a rarities album titled The Good, the Bad and the Ugly Vol. 1.

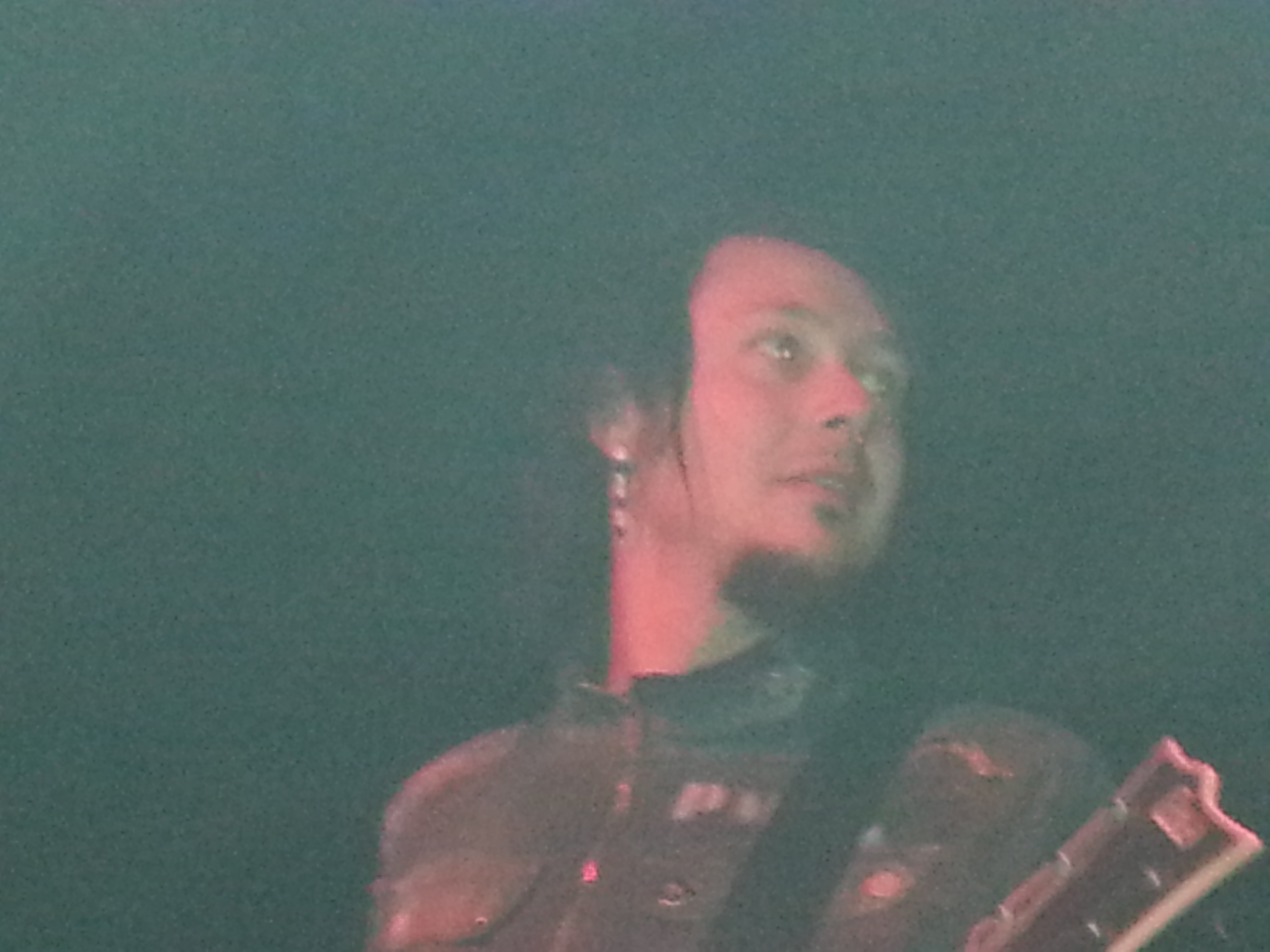
Nick Quijano

A new tour was also started, but M.33 had left the band, with Spider stating "[n]o big scandal involved, just evolution" in response to his departure. Adam 12 left the band on good terms to focus on other interests including sound producing and recording with Argon 40. Former Alien Ant Farm guitarist Terry Corso and former Halfcocked (the first band on Spider's label) guitarist Johnny Rock Heatley were brought in to round out the live show. In August 2005, Powerman 5000 performed at the sixth annual Gathering of the Juggalos on the main stage. The band then signed to DRT Entertainment, who released the album entitled Destroy What You Enjoy on August 1, 2006. The song "Wild World" was the first and only single on the album, with the band also filming a music video for the song. The band would go on to tour through the U.S., including a live appearance on G4tv's Attack of the Show!, where they performed the song "Return to the City of the Dead" from Destroy What You Enjoy.

In 2007, Evan Rodaniche, singer and guitarist of Los Angeles band Cage9 (originally from Panama City, Panama), joined the band through his acquaintance with Adrian Ost. He toured as the band's sole guitarist until later that year, when Dave Pino was added to the mix. Pino had just moved to Los Angeles and heard about the open slot through his friendship with Piggy D (bassist for Rob Zombie). Upon the departure of Siggy from the band in 2008, Gustavo Aued was brought in to replace him on bass, and later that year, drummer Gordon Heckaman joined the band (both originally from Cage9 as well), solidifying the lineup for the next album.

=== Somewhere on the Other Side of Nowhere (2007–2011) ===
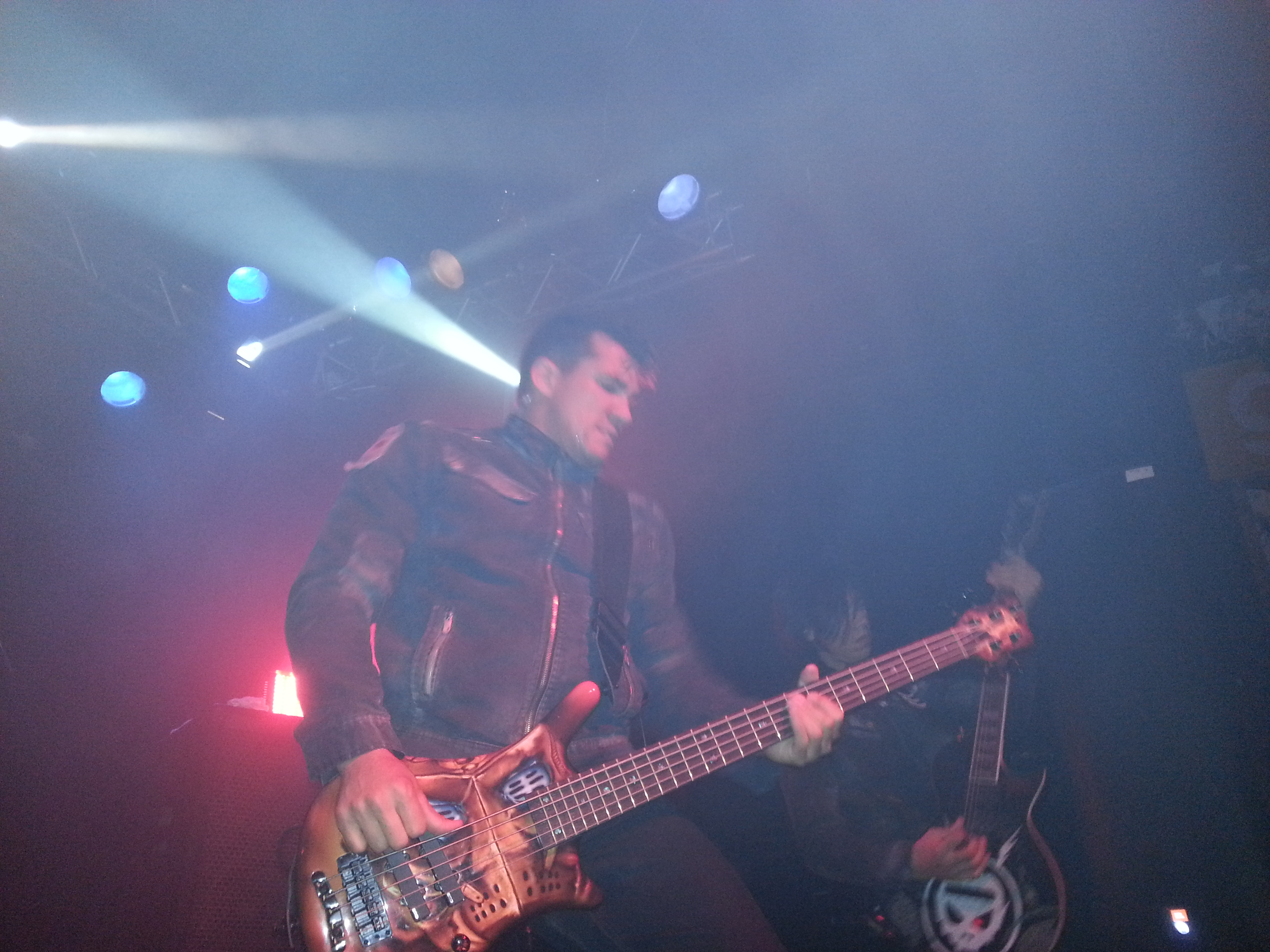
Gustavo Aued

On May 21, 2007, Powerman 5000 claimed via a Myspace blog post that they will be releasing a new studio album in 2007. The following is taken directly from said post: "Considering the bands track record of putting out CDs once every three years it seems hard to believe that, yes we will put out a new disc in 2007!! It's all just beginning to develop and the wheres, whos and whats are to be determined but new rock is on the way!!" However, talk about the record soon simmered, and no new information was released.

Finally, in December 2008, the new track "Super Villain" premiered on the band's Myspace page, showcasing their return to their platinum-selling sound of the late 1990s. On January 28, 2009, a preview of tracks from their upcoming sixth studio album were posted on the group's Myspace page, containing clips from the songs "Super Villain", "V Is for Vampire", and "Horror Show". Powerman 5000 posted that "Super Villain" would become available for digital purchase on February 10, 2009, on iTunes and Amazon.

On April 7, 2009, Powerman 5000 released a blog on their Myspace page stating that Anyone for Doomsday? has officially been re-released. The legal battle ended and the album was released under the SKG Music License. The album is available on iTunes as a digital download. On April 21, 2009, the band released "V Is for Vampire", the second single from their album, which is planned for a summer release.

On July 7, 2009, Powerman 5000 released a blog on their Myspace page stating that the new album has been finished, and that a release date, track listing, artwork, and additional tour dates was coming soon. On July 27, 2009, Powerman 5000 appeared on Rockline, announcing the title of the new album as Somewhere on the Other Side of Nowhere. A tentative release date of October 6, 2009, was also announced. Three new songs were also premiered on the show, including "Timebomb, Baby", "Make Us Insane", and "Show Me What You've Got". On Myspace, Spider posted a blog talking about the three new songs filled with comments of the fans liking the music.

On September 6, 2009, Powerman 5000 released the album cover design along with the promotion of their tour starting on October 24, 2009. They also released two new promotional videos on YouTube for their new album, confirming its release date as October 6, 2009.

On October 1, 2009, the full track "Do Your Thing" was leaked onto YouTube. The song was apparently taken from the Megatronic Records Forum, which frontman Spider One currently owns. The CD Somewhere on the Other Side of Nowhere was officially released on October 6, 2009, in the U.S. and was available in Canada on October 20, 2009, two weeks after the reported release date. The band embarked on a national tour in support of the album.

On December 7, 2009, Spider, the band's lead singer posted links on his Twitter page linking to FearNET.com which is hosting the band's music video for their first single "Super Villain". The video is also available on YouTube and stars Johnathon Schaech as the infamous Super Villain.

Powerman 5000 played at the U-Fest in Phoenix, Arizona, on April 23, 2011, playing alongside Accept, Papa Roach, Drowning Pool, Nonpoint, All That Remains, and Hollywood Undead. This was the band's third consecutive appearance at the yearly show.

=== Copies, Clones & Replicants and Builders of the Future (2011–2016) ===
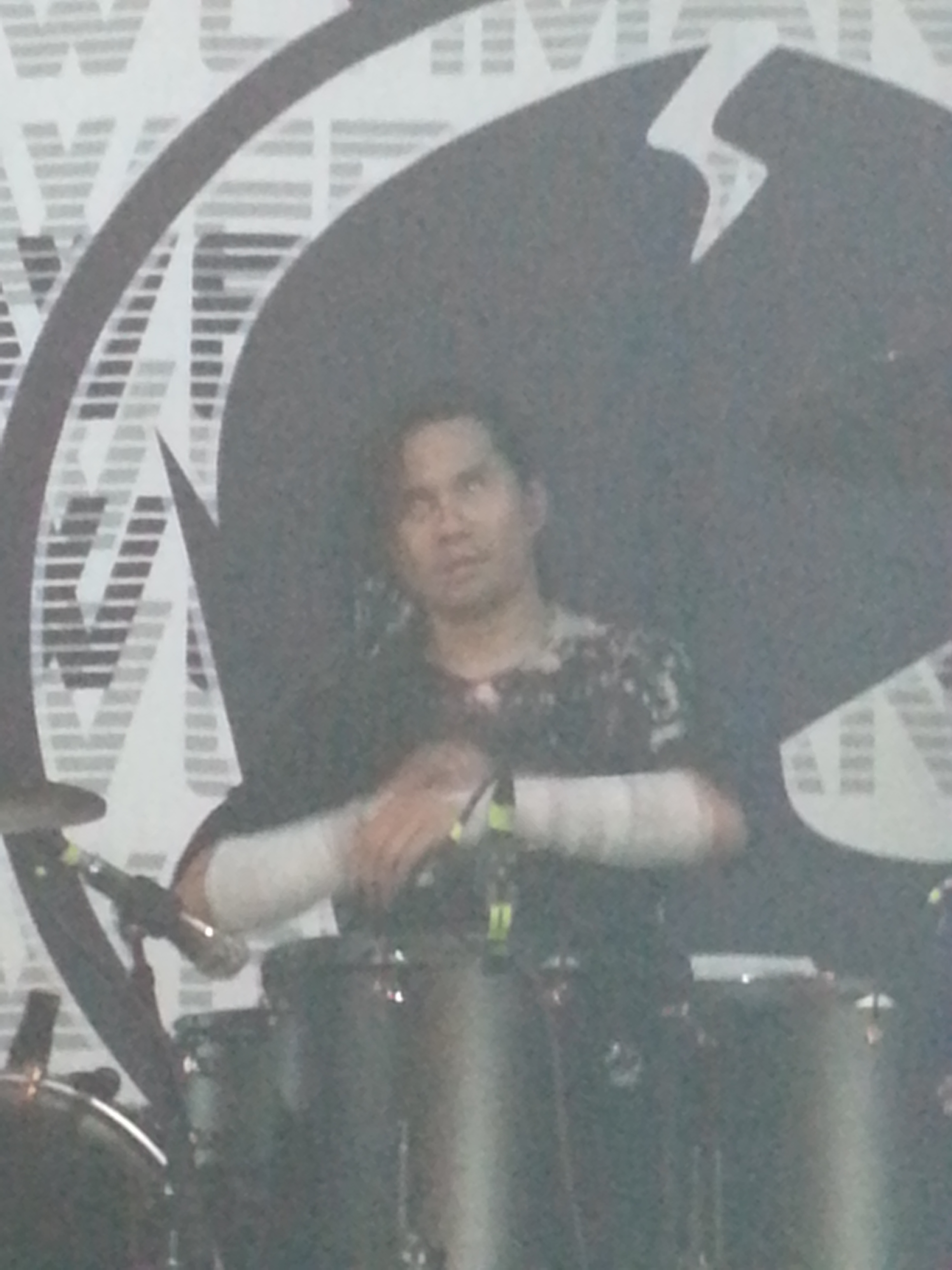
DJ Rattan

The band announced on May 23, 2011, that they had started work on a new album. On July 24, 2011, Powerman 5000 released a cover of Devo's "Whip It", a cover of "Space Oddity" by David Bowie on July 28, 2011, and a cover of Van Halen's "Jump" on July 31, 2011, on their website. Released by Cleopatra Records, Copies, Clones & Replicants included covers of other new wave songs such as The Fixx's "One Thing Leads to Another" and Eddy Grant's "Electric Avenue".

On July 11, 2012, Spider began teasing a new song by posting on his Twitter that "Someone sneaked a camera in the studio tonight and filmed the speaker while it blasted a new Powerman 5000 tune!".

Their album Builders of the Future was released on May 27, 2014, and was co-produced/co-written by guitarist Nick Quijano Sci55ors, as well as engineered and co-produced by Evan Rodaniche (Evan9), both former guitarists. The band was set to play a co-headlining tour in the US with Wayne Static in November with American Head Charge supporting them until Wayne's death in November 2014.

=== New Wave and The Noble Rot and Abandon Ship (2016–present) ===
On May 15, 2016, the band announced that they plan to release new music before the end of that year. By October 21 that same year, the band released a short snippet of the track "Die on Your Feet" from the new album onto their official Facebook page.

By June 2017, the title of the 11th album was revealed as New Wave. It was released on October 27, 2017, with the music video of the album's first official single "Sid Vicious in a Dress" released by September 5 that same year. In support of the album, the band began touring in the U.S. in October of the same year, and would last through the end of 2018. On June 4, 2018, the band announced they would be taking part of the "Summer of Screams" Tour in September, along with Mushroomhead and The Browning. However, on August 23, it was announced the band had to cancel their performances for the tour for medical reasons involving Spider's vocals.

In March 2020, it was announced the band has been signed to Cleopatra Records (whom had previously released the cover album Copies, Clones & Replicants), with their new album titled The Noble Rot set to have a release for August 28, accompanied by a new tour overseas. The lead single "Black Lipstick" was released on June 3 and a video for the song, directed by Spider One, was released on the same day. This album also included a remixed version of the band's 1999 single "When Worlds Collide," which Spider described as "a weird process of trying to emulate myself."

On May 10, 2024, Abandon Ship was released, garnering favorable to mixed reception. Physical copies featured a remixed release of the 2001 single "Bombshell" as a bonus track, much like how the previous album, The Noble Rot, had included a remix of "When Worlds Collide." This re-recording saw relatively favorable reception, with even mixed-to-negative coverage noting the track as "worth listening to."

In February 2026, the band was confirmed to be on the roster for the Louder Than Life festival taking place in Louisville in September.

== Musical style ==
Powerman 5000 has changed their style throughout their career, taking inspiration from nu metal and rap-rock in the mid-90s, science fiction and industrial metal at the turn of the millennium, punk rock through the 2000s, and electronic rock through the 2010s and 2020s. Their music is driven by staccato guitar playing and electronic samples, which has been compared to the music of Rob Zombie, Spider One's older brother.

Annie Zaleski of Spin said the band's music "often exudes a cartoonish, sci-fi vibe". Spider One often uses spoken word or chanting in his vocalization. AllMusic's Chris Slawecki said that "Spider doesn't sing one single lyric, instead barking out the lyrics in a hard staccato delivery." The band's lyrics are often campy and make reference to pulp science fiction. These themes include gods and monsters, global annihilation and robot violence, as well as anti-consumerism.

Mega!! Kung Fu Radio incorporated elements of heavy metal, hip-hop, hard rock and funk. Transform featured more emphasis on melody and human-driven sounds, shifting away from the computerized sounds of the band's earlier albums. Destroy What You Enjoy featured a punk-driven sound.

Regarding the band's relation to the nu metal genre, Spider One recalled: "It was a scene, but everybody was very different. You had us doing this weird electronic metal, sci-fi-influenced, and you had guys like [Marilyn] Manson and Rob [Zombie] doing this sort of darker, horror-esque [brand of rock], and you had Limp Bizkit doing party-rap music, and Korn doing this [...] Everybody was really doing interesting things, but somehow it all fit together."

== Band members ==
=== Current members ===
- Spider One (Michael Cummings) – lead vocals (1991–present)
- DJ Rattan (Rattan Cayabyab) – drums (2013–present)
- Taylor Haycraft – rhythm guitar (2019–present)
- Dan Schiz – lead guitar (2022–present)
- Evan9 (Evan Rodaniche) – bass (2026–present); rhythm guitar, backing vocals (2007–2011)

=== Former members ===
Guitarists

- Adam 12 (Adam Williams) – lead guitar (1991–2005)
- M33 (Mike Tempesta) – rhythm guitar (1998–2004)
- Johnny Rock Heatley – lead guitar, backing vocals (2005–2007)
- Terry Corso – rhythm guitar (2005–2007)
- Velkro – lead guitar (2007–2012)
- Sci55ors (Nick Quijano) – rhythm guitar (2012–2016)
- Zer0 (Richard Jazmin) – lead guitar (2013–2015)
- Ryan Hernandez – rhythm guitar (2016–2017)
- Ty Oliver – lead guitar (2015–2022)

Bassists

- Dorian 27 (Dorian Heartsong) – bass (1991–2001)
- Siggy 00 (Siggy Sjursen) – bass (2002–2008)
- X51 (Gustavo Aued) – bass (2008–2015)
- Murv3 (Murv Douglas) – bass (2015–2026)

Drummers

- Al 3 (Al Pahanish Jr.) – drums (1991–2001)
- GFlash (Gordon Heckaman) – drums (2008–2011)
- Ad7 (Adrian Ost) – drums, backing vocals (2001–2008, 2012–2013)

Others

- Jordan Cohen – percussion (1991–1997)
- DJ Brian Collymore – turntables, keyboards (1991–1993)

=== Live musicians ===
- Jesse Sauve – lead guitar (fill-in for one tour 2013)
- Nick Annis – rhythm guitar (fill-in for some shows 2011)
- Erik Himel – rhythm guitar (fill-in for shows 2018 to early 2019; 2023 Australia tour)
- Greg Johnson – additional guitar (2017 acoustic show)

== Discography ==
Studio albums

- The Blood-Splat Rating System (1995)
- Tonight the Stars Revolt! (1999)
- Anyone for Doomsday? (2001)
- Transform (2003)
- Destroy What You Enjoy (2006)
- Somewhere on the Other Side of Nowhere (2009)
- Copies, Clones & Replicants (2011)
- Builders of the Future (2014)
- New Wave (2017)
- The Noble Rot (2020)
- Abandon Ship (2024)
