= Spider One =

American singer

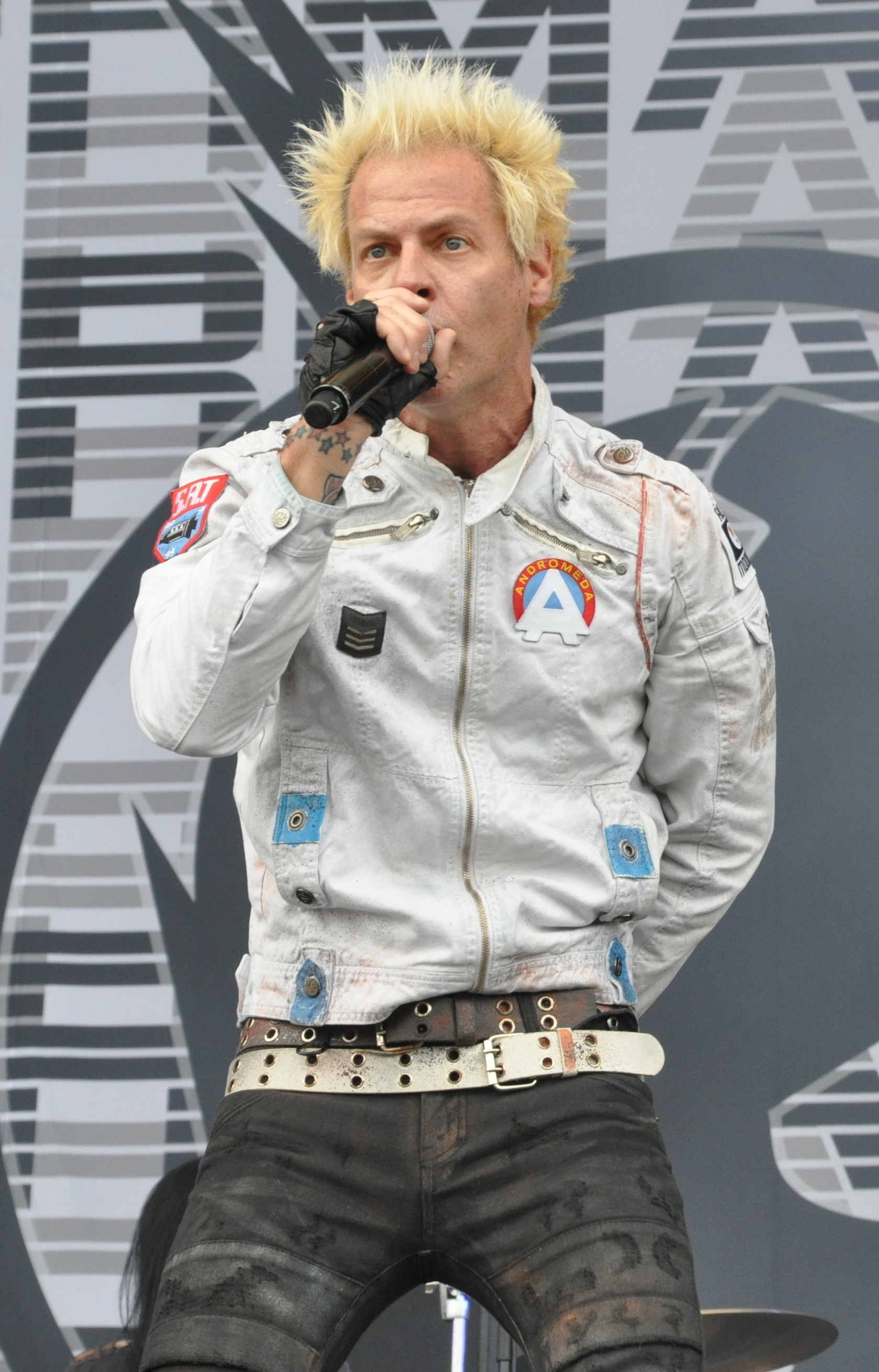
- Cummings performing in 2014

Background information
- Born: Michael David Cummings; August 25, 1968 (age 58); Haverhill, Massachusetts, U.S.
- Genres: Industrial metal; nu metal; hard rock; alternative metal; electronic rock; punk rock
- Occupation: Singer
- Years active: 1990–present
- Member of: Powerman 5000
- Website: powerman5000.com

Michael David Cummings (born August 25, 1968), better known as Spider One, is an American singer, writer, and director. He is the founder and only consistent member of the rock band Powerman 5000.

== Career ==
Cummings was born in Haverhill, Massachusetts. He is the younger brother of musician and film director Rob Zombie by two years, and has played some shows with him.

In 1990, Cummings recorded the 12" single "Much Evil" with producer Lamar Lowder. Building on local success, including winning the Boston Phoenix/WFNX 1990 Readers' Poll "Best Rap Act" category and getting nominated for a Boston Music Award.

Cummings co-developed the horror/black comedy mockumentary series Death Valley, which aired on MTV for one season in 2011. He directed the films Allegoria, Bury the Bride, Little Bites, and Big Baby.

AllMusic described Cummings' vocal style on the album Tonight the Stars Revolt! as monotone chanting. Other descriptions of his style include the frequent "barks and rhythmic delivery."

== Filmography ==
Television
Year	Title	Role	Notes
1996	Beverly Hills, 90210	Playing himself	Season 6, episode 27 ("Strike a Match")
2011	Death Valley	Producer/Concept	12 episodes
2022	Allegoria	Director/Writer	Film
2023	Bury the Bride	Director/Writer	Film
2024	Little Bites	Director/Writer	Film
2026	Big Baby	Director/Writer	Film
