= When Worlds Collide (disambiguation) =

When Worlds Collide is a 1932 science fiction novel by Philip Wylie and Edwin Balmer.

When Worlds Collide may also refer to:

== Film and television ==
- When Worlds Collide (1951 film), an adaptation of the 1932 novel

=== Television episodes ===
- "When Worlds Collide", All Saints season 7, episode 24 (2004)
- "When Worlds Collide", Atomic Betty season 1, episode 7a (2004)
- "When Worlds Collide", Between Two Worlds episode 5 (2020)
- "When Worlds Collide", Digimon Fusion season 1, episode 30 (2011)
- "When Worlds Collide", Holby City series 21, episode 32 (2019)
- "When Worlds Collide", Numbers season 4, episode 18 (2008)
- "When Worlds Collide", Packed to the Rafters season 3, episode 16 (2010)
- "When Worlds Collide", Phineas and Ferb season 3, episode 58 (2012)
- "When Worlds Collide", Side Hustle season 2, episode 12 (2022)
- "When Worlds Collide", Teenage Mutant Ninja Turtles (2012) season 5, episodes 5–6 (2017)
- "When Worlds Collide", The Challenge: Vendettas episode 1 (2018)
- "When Worlds Collide", The Challenge: World Championship episode 2 (2023)
- "When Worlds Collide", The Equalizer (2021) season 2, episode 7 (2021)
- "When Worlds Collide", The Love Boat season 7, episode 7a (1983)
- "When Worlds Collide", The Upper Hand series 2, episode 2 (1991)
- "When Worlds Collide", The Wonder Years season 4, episode 16 (1991)
- "When Worlds Collide", Who's the Boss? season 2, episode 18 (1986)

== Music ==
=== Albums ===
- When Worlds Collide (Maroon album), 2006
- When Worlds Collide (Thin White Rope album), 1994
- When Worlds Collide: A Tribute to Daniel Amos, a 1999 compilation album
- When Worlds Collide, a 2009 album by The Vendetta and Danny Diablo
- When Worlds Collide, a 1997 album by 1.8.7

=== Songs ===
- "When Worlds Collide" (Powerman 5000 song), 1999
- "When Worlds Collide" (Zara Larsson song), 2013, from her debut EP Introducing

== Other uses ==
- ECW When Worlds Collide, 1994 and 1996 professional wrestling events
- AAA When Worlds Collide, 1994 professional wrestling pay-per-view
- "When Worlds Collide", a song featured in "SpongeBob BC", season 3, episode 14 of SpongeBob SquarePants (2004)

== See also ==
- Worlds Collide (disambiguation)
- Worlds in Collision, a 1950 book by Immanuel Velikovsky
- Two Worlds Collide (disambiguation)
- When Two Worlds Collide, an album by Jerry Lee Lewis
