= Worlds Collide =

Worlds Collide may refer to:

- Worlds Collide (comics), a 1994 intercompany crossover between DC Comics and Milestone
  - Worlds Collide (2023 comic book), new version of the aforementioned story
- UFC 36 or Worlds Collide, a 2002 Ultimate Fighting Championship event
- "Worlds Collide", a story arc of the 2003 version of Teenage Mutant Ninja Turtles
- "Worldscollide.com", the former website of Mortal Kombat vs. DC Universe
- Worlds Collide (Archie Comics), a twelve-part crossover event between Archie Comics' Sonic the Hedgehog and Mega Man adaptations
- Worlds Collide (tour), 2022 concert tour co-headlined by rock bands Within Temptation and Evanescence
- Worlds Collide (novel), by Chris Colfer (2017)
- WWE Worlds Collide, a series of WWE Network events

== Albums ==
- Worlds Collide (Apocalyptica album), 2007
- Worlds Collide (Dead by April album), 2017

== See also ==
- After Worlds Collide, a 1934 sequel to the 1933 science fiction novel, When Worlds Collide, both of which were co-written by Philip Gordon Wylie and Edwin Balmer
- Worlds in Collision, a 1950 book by Immanuel Velikovsky
- When Worlds Collide (disambiguation)
