= Supernova Goes Pop =

Single by Powerman 5000

from the album Tonight the Stars Revolt!
- Released: April 2000
- Genre: Industrial metal; nu metal
- Length: 3:14
- Label: DreamWorks
- Composer: Powerman 5000
- Lyricist: Spider One
- Producer: Sylvia Massy

Powerman 5000 singles chronology
"Nobody's Real" (1999)	"Supernova Goes Pop" (2000)	"Ultra Mega" (2000)

Music video
- "Supernova Goes Pop" on YouTube

"Supernova Goes Pop" is a song by Powerman 5000 from the album Tonight the Stars Revolt!. It was released as a CD single in 2000. When played live, "An Eye Is Upon You" is played directly preceding "Supernova Goes Pop", although the live arrangement features Spider One slightly changing the lyrics from the album version.

== Music video and media ==
The affiliated music video for "Supernova Goes Pop" features the 1998–2001 lineup of Adam Jeremy Williams, Allan Pahanish Jr., Dorian Heartsong, Mike Tempesta, and Spider One playing the song live at an unspecified show.

"Supernova Goes Pop" has been used in the soundtrack for Gran Turismo 3: A-Spec in 2001.

== Reception ==
"Supernova Goes Pop" is one of Powerman 5000's most popular songs, and is frequently played live. It is considered among their best songs by some fans. It has appeared as part of their song lineup since the late 1990s and generally receives favorable ratings, around a 4/5 stars or 8/10 rating. Pahanish is praised for his drum work on the song, as well as across the entire album. The song is sometimes seen as overshadowed by "When Worlds Collide", but is still generally perceived as quality material from the band, even in the modern day and in live performances. It has also been played while opening for other artists, such as Rob Zombie, where it has been described as an energetic and fun start to a concert.

== Track listing ==
All lyrics are written by Spider One.

No.	Title	Length
1.	"Supernova Goes Pop" (LP version)	3:14
