= When Worlds Collide (1951 film) =

1951 film by Rudolph Maté

- Theatrical release poster
- Directed by: Rudolph Maté
- Screenplay by: Sydney Boehm
- Based on: When Worlds Collide; 1933 stories in Blue Book Magazine by: Edwin Balmer; Philip Wylie
- Produced by: George Pal
- Starring: Richard Derr; Barbara Rush; Peter Hansen; John Hoyt
- Cinematography: John F. Seitz; W. Howard Greene
- Edited by: Arthur P. Schmidt
- Music by: Leith Stevens
- Color process: Technicolor
- Production company: Paramount Pictures
- Distributed by: Paramount Pictures
- Release date: November 15, 1951
- Running time: 83 minutes
- Country: United States
- Language: English
- Budget: $936,000 (estimated)
- Box office: $1.6 million (US/Canada rentals, 1951)

When Worlds Collide is a 1951 American science fiction disaster film released by Paramount Pictures. It was produced by George Pal, directed by Rudolph Maté, and stars Richard Derr, Barbara Rush, Peter Hansen, and John Hoyt. The film is based on the 1933 science fiction novel by Edwin Balmer and Philip Wylie.

The film recounts the coming destruction of the Earth by a rogue star (Note: In the novel, the object that destroys the Earth is another planet. The change to a star makes the film's title inaccurate, as is the film's poster's wording: "Planets destroy Earth!") called Bellus and the desperate efforts to build a space ark to transport a group of men and women to Bellus' single planet, Zyra.

== Plot ==
In the prologue, quotes from the Book of Genesis are shown and narrated, describing God's decision to wipe out humanity.

Pilot David Randall flies top-secret photographs from South African astronomer Dr. Emery Bronson to Dr. Cole Hendron in the United States. Hendron, with the assistance of his daughter Joyce, confirms their worst fears: Bronson has discovered a rogue star named Bellus, accompanied by an Earth-sized planet named Zyra, which is on a collision course with Earth.

Hendron warns the United Nations that the end of the world is little more than eight months away, with a close pass first by Zyra, before Bellus destroys the Earth nineteen days later. He pleads for the construction of "arks" to transport a lucky few to Zyra in the faint hope that humanity can be saved from extinction. With other scientists scoffing at his claims, his proposal is rejected.

Two wealthy humanitarians arrange for a start to construction and a lease on a former Army proving ground to build an ark. To finance the rest, Hendron meets with wheelchair-using business magnate Sidney Stanton. Stanton demands the right to select the passengers in exchange for his money, but Hendron insists that he is not qualified to make those choices; all he can do is buy a seat on the ark. Stanton capitulates. Groups in other nations start building their own spaceships.

Joyce tells her father she is attracted to Randall, so he finds an excuse to keep him around, much to the annoyance of her longtime boyfriend, medical doctor Tony Drake. As Bellus nears, martial law is declared and residents in coastal regions are relocated inland.

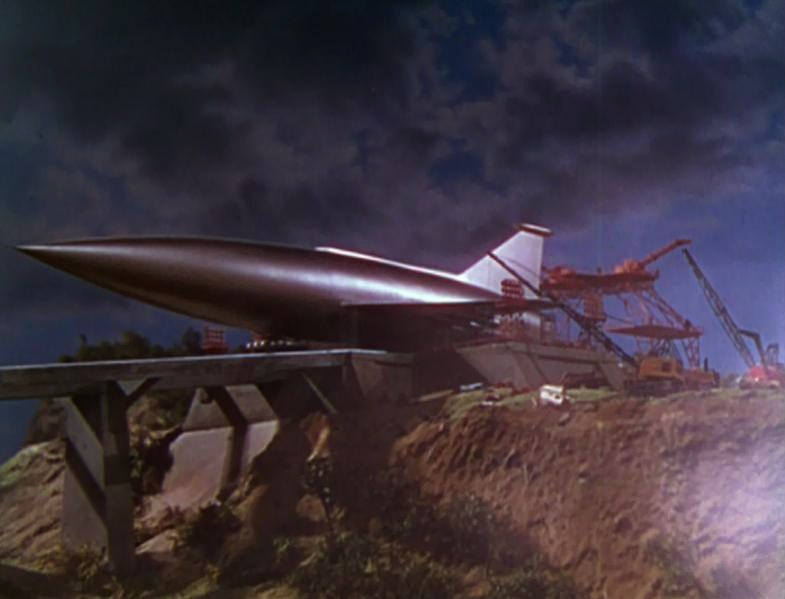
The spaceship on its launching ramp in a still from the film

Zyra makes a close approach first, causing massive earthquakes, volcanic eruptions, and tsunamis that wreak havoc around the world. Dr. Bronson is killed by a falling crane. Afterward, Drake and Randall travel by helicopter to drop off supplies to people in distress. When Randall gets off to rescue a little boy stranded on a rooftop in a flooded area, Drake flies away with the boy, leaving Randall stranded, but reconsiders and returns.

As the day of doom approaches, the passengers are selected by lottery, though Hendron reserves seats for himself, Stanton, Joyce, Drake, pilot Dr. George Frey, and Randall, for his daughter's sake. He also includes the young boy who was rescued, for a total of 45 passengers. Randall, feeling he lacks any needed skills, rejects his guaranteed seat and instead pretends to draw a lottery number, but Hendron knows better. For Joyce's sake, Drake later tells Randall that Frey has a "heart condition" that may kill him during liftoff, convincing Randall he is needed as co-pilot.

The cynical Stanton fears what the desperate lottery losers will do, so he stockpiles weapons. When a young man turns in his winning number because his sweetheart was not selected, Ferris – Stanton's longsuffering assistant – claims it at gunpoint, but is shot dead by Stanton. Hendron adds the young woman to the passenger list, over Stanton's objections, and takes the precaution of having the chosen women board the ark while the men wait outside. Shortly before liftoff, many of the lottery losers seize Stanton's firearms to try to force their way aboard. Hendron initiates the launch prematurely, while he and Stanton are still outside, to conserve fuel and improve the chance of a successful landing. With an effort born of ultimate desperation, Stanton stands up and walks in a futile attempt to board the departing spaceship.

The crew are rendered unconscious by the g-force of acceleration, and do not witness Earth's collision with Bellus. When Randall comes to and sees Dr. Frey already awake and piloting the ship, he realizes Drake deceived him.

After the spaceship enters Zyra's atmosphere, the fuel runs out. Randall glides the ship to a safe landing on snow. Zyra turns out to be habitable. Randall and Joyce walk hand-in-hand down the ramp with their fellow survivors as a new day dawns. In the background, an artificial structure is visible.

== Cast ==
- Richard Derr as David Randall
- Barbara Rush as Joyce Hendron
- Peter Hansen as Dr. Tony Drake
- John Hoyt as Sydney Stanton
- Larry Keating as Dr. Cole Hendron
- Rachel Ames as Julie Cummings (as Judith Ames)
- Stephen Chase as Dr. George Frye
- Frank Cady as Harold Ferris
- Hayden Rorke as Dr. Emery Bronson
- Sandro Giglio as Dr. Ottinger
- James Seay as Donovan (uncredited)
- Kirk Alyn as Rioter bringing guns (uncredited)
- Stuart Whitman as Rioter by bank (uncredited) - his first film role
- John Ridgely as Chief Customs Inspector (uncredited)
- Paul Frees as Narrator/U.S. President (uncredited)
- Art Gilmore as Paul (uncredited)

== Production ==
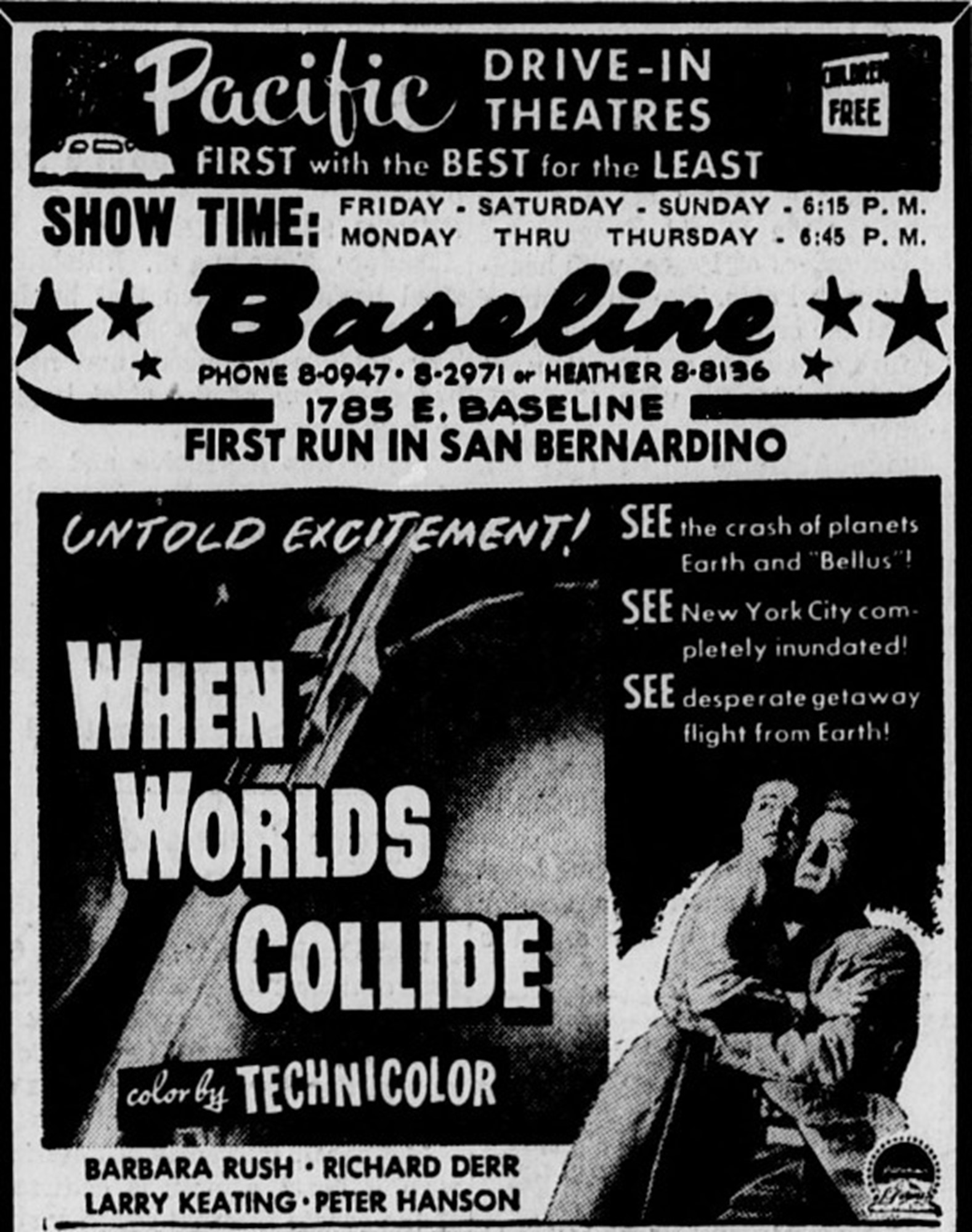
Drive-in advertisement from 1954

Originally, producer-director Cecil B. DeMille considered adapting the novels When Worlds Collide and its sequel After Worlds Collide when they were first serialized in Blue Book magazine in 1933. Film rights accordingly were held by Paramount, which often worked with De Mille. Although he never directed the film adaptation, DeMille did go on to produce the 1951 version, and he contemplated making a movie about the Space Race near the end of his life.

In 1949 it was announced George Pal had purchased the screen rights. The film was to be directed by Irving Pichel who had just made The Great Rupert for Pal and was about to make Destination Moon for the producer. In December Rip Van Ronkel, who co-wrote the screenplay for Destination Moon, was hired to write the script.

In February 1950 it was announced the film would be made at Paramount. In August Pal said the film would be the first made under a three-picture deal with Paramount, the others being The Last Man in the World and a musical. (The latter two were never made.)

When George Pal began his adaptation years later, he initially wanted to make a more lavish production with a larger budget, but he wound up being forced to scale back his plans.

Douglas Fairbanks Jr. was first considered for the role of Dave Randall, but Richard Derr was finally hired for the part.

Chesley Bonestell worked as an adviser. He is credited with the artwork used for the film; he created the design for the space ark that was constructed. The final scene in the film, the sunrise landscape on Zyra, was taken from a Bonestell sketch. Because of budget and time constraints, the director was forced to use this color sketch rather than a finished matte painting. The sketch has visible artificial structures in the distance to the left and right as David Randall and Joyce Hendron leave the ark, suggesting an alien civilization. The additional poor quality still image showing a drowned New York City is often attributed to Bonestell, but was not actually drawn by him.

Filming started on December 14, 1950, under the direction of Rudolph Mate. "I tried to make the story as realistic as I could," said Mate. Filming of the live action scenes took 27 days, with the effects taking twice as long.

UCLA's differential analyzer is shown briefly near the beginning of the film; it "verifies" the initial hand calculations confirming the coming destruction of the Earth.

Producer George Pal considered making a sequel based on the second novel, After Worlds Collide, but the box office failure of his Conquest of Space (1955) made that impossible.

== Reception ==
=== Critical ===
When Worlds Collide was reviewed by Bosley Crowther of The New York Times, who noted that George Pal had followed up on his other prophetic epic, Destination Moon: "... this time the science soothsayer, whose forecasts have the virtue, at least, of being represented in provocative visual terms, offers rather cold comfort for those scholars who would string along with him. One of the worlds which he arranged to have collide is ours". He reported that "Except for a rustle of applause to salute a perfect pancake landing, the drowsy audience at the Globe, where the film opened yesterday, showed slight interest. It appeared skeptical and even bored. Mr. Pal barely gets us out there, but this time he doesn't bring us back".

Freelance writer Melvin E. Matthews calls the film a "doomsday parable for the nuclear age of the '50s". Emory University physics professor Sidney Perkowitz notes that When Worlds Collide is the first in a long list of films where "science wielded by a heroic scientist confronts a catastrophe". He calls the special effects exceptional.

Librarian and filmographer Charles P. Mitchell was critical of the "... scientific gaffes that dilute the storyline" and a "failure to provide consistent first-class effects". He says that "the large number of plot defects are annoying and prevent this admirable effort from achieving top-drawer status".

=== Awards ===
When Worlds Collide won an Honorary Academy Award for Special Effects at the 24th Academy Awards. John F. Seitz and W. Howard Greene were also nominated for Best Cinematography (Color), losing to Alfred Gilks and John Alton for An American in Paris.

== Comic book adaptation ==
The film was adapted into a comic book by George Evans in Motion Picture Comics #110 (Fawcett Comics, May 1952).

== In popular culture ==
- When Worlds Collide is one of the many films referenced in the opening theme ("Science Fiction/Double Feature") of both the stage musical The Rocky Horror Show (1973) and its cinematic counterpart, The Rocky Horror Picture Show (1975).
  "But when worlds collide, said George Pal to his bride"
- In the feature film Star Trek II: The Wrath of Khan (1982), two cargo containers can be seen labeled "Bellus" and "Zyra" in the Genesis Cave.
- In the film adaptation of L.A. Confidential (1997), tabloid writer Sid Hudgens arranges for the publicity-loving detective officer Jack Vincennes to arrest a young actor on the night of the premiere of When Worlds Collide. This results in photos being taken of the arrest, with the fictional El Cortez Theatre (actually an abandoned bank building at 5620 Hollywood Blvd.) redressed as a movie theatre marquee in the background, accompanied by the headline "Movie Premiere Pot Bust" (the scene is set in 1953, long after the actual 1951 premiere).
- When Worlds Collide is the title of a 1975 album (the related single is "Did Worlds Collide?") by Richard Hudson and John Ford, their third release after leaving Strawbs.
- "When Worlds Collide" is the title of a single by the heavy metal band Powerman 5000 from the 1999 album Tonight the Stars Revolt!
- In Terry Pratchett and Stephen Baxter's 2013 novel The Long War, scientists have named the theoretical space object which obliterated one of the alternate Earths "Bellos", which the character Sally Linsay describes as "Some dumb old movie reference".

== Remake ==
The 1998 film Deep Impact originated as a combination of a remake of When Worlds Collide and an adaptation of the 1993 Arthur C. Clarke novel The Hammer of God, and the project was originally acknowledged as such, although the finished film did not acknowledge any of its sources since it was judged to be different enough not to require it.

== See also ==
- Impact events in fiction
- Warning from Space (1956)
- Gorath (1962)
- Melancholia (2011)
