= Philip Wylie =

American writer (1902–1971)

- Born: Philip Gordon Wylie; May 12, 1902; Beverly, Massachusetts, U.S.
- Died: October 25, 1971 (aged 69); Miami, Florida, U.S.
- Occupations: Author; short story writer; screenwriter
- Spouses: Sally Ondek; Frederica Ballard
- Children: Karen Pryor
- Writing career
- Genres: Science fiction; social criticism; mystery fiction; detective fiction; nautical fiction
- Notable works: When Worlds Collide; Generation of Vipers

Philip Gordon Wylie (May 12, 1902 – October 25, 1971) was an American writer of works ranging from science fiction, mysteries, and social diatribes, to satire concerning topics such as ecology and the threat of nuclear holocaust.

== Early life and education ==
Born in Beverly, Massachusetts, Wylie was the son of Presbyterian minister Edmund Melville Wylie and Edna Edwards, a novelist, who died when Philip was five years old. His family later moved to Montclair, New Jersey.

Wylie attended Princeton University from 1920 to 1923.

== Career ==
A writer of fiction and nonfiction, Wylie's output included hundreds of articles, novels, serials, short stories, syndicated newspaper columns, and works of social criticism. He also wrote screenplays while in Hollywood, was an editor for Farrar & Rinehart, served on the Dade County, Florida Defense Council, was a director of the Lerner Marine Laboratory, and at one time was an adviser to the chairman of the U.S. Congressional Joint Committee for Atomic Energy, which led to the creation of the Atomic Energy Commission. Most of Wylie's major writings contain critical, though often philosophical, views on man and society as a result of his studies and interests in biology, ethnology, physics, and psychology.

Sixteen films were made based on screenplays, novels, or stories written by Wylie. He sold the rights for two others that were never produced.

Wylie's wide range of interests defies easy classification, but his earliest work exercised great influence in 20th century science fiction pulp magazines and comic books:

- Gladiator (1930) may have partially inspired the comic-book character Superman. (Note: Siegel flatly denied that Wylie’s novel had influenced him ... . His denial seems to date from Wylie’s threat to sue him for plagiarism in 1940 – Siegel reportedly even signed an affidavit [insisting there was no connection].)
- The Savage Gentleman (1932) "Pulp historians point out that the themes of The Savage Gentleman are replicated to an uncanny degree in the pulp character Clark "Doc" Savage (1933) created by Lester Dent ..." — Richard A. Lupoff
- When Worlds Collide (1933), co-written with Edwin Balmer, inspired Alex Raymond's comic strip Flash Gordon and was adapted as an eponymous 1951 film by producer George Pal. (Note: Raymond took the basic premise of Philip Wylie's When Worlds Collide, which was being reprinted in Blue Book magazine at the time, and used it as his starting point for adventure.)

Wylie applied engineering principles and the scientific method quite broadly in his work. His novel The Disappearance (1951) is about what happens when everyone suddenly finds that all members of the opposite sex are missing (all the men have to get along without women, and vice versa). The book delves into the double standards between men and women that existed prior the women's movement of the 1970s, exploring the nature of the relationship between men and women and the issues of women's rights and homosexuality.

During World War II, writing The Paradise Crater (1945) resulted in Wylie's house arrest by the federal government; in this work, he described a post-WWII 1965 Nazi conspiracy to develop and use uranium-237 bombs, months before the first successful atomic test at Alamogordo – the most highly classified secret of the war. Wylie's book of essays, Generation of Vipers (1942), was a best-seller during the 1940s and inspired the term "Momism". Some people have accused Generation of Vipers of being misogynistic. (His only child, Karen Pryor, is the author of a classic book for breastfeeding mothers, Nursing Your Baby; she has commented that her father was far from being a misogynist.) The Disappearance shows his thinking on the subject is very complex. His novel of manners, Finnley Wren, was also highly regarded in its time.

In 1945, he wrote a political column for the New York Post.

Wylie wrote 69 stories in the "Crunch and Des" series, most of which appeared in the Saturday Evening Post, about the adventures of Captain Crunch Adams, master of the charter boat Poseidon, which was the basis of a brief television series. In 1941, Wylie became vice-president of the International Game Fish Association, and for many years was responsible for writing IGFA rules and reviewing world record claims.

Wylie's 1954 novel Tomorrow! dealt graphically with the civilian impact of thermonuclear war to make a case for a strong Civil Defense network in the United States, as he told the story of two neighboring cities (one prepared, one unprepared) before and after an attack by missile-armed Soviet bombers. This was adapted on 17 October 1956, by ABC Radio, as a one-hour drama narrated by Orson Welles, produced in cooperation with the Federal Civil Defense Administration.

Wylie was also active in writing detective and mystery novelettes for a variety of magazines. Five of them were collected in 2010 as Ten Thousand Blunt Instruments and Other Mysteries, published by Crippen & Landru in its "Lost Classics" series and edited by Bill Pronzini.

An article Wylie wrote in 1951 in The Saturday Evening Post entitled "Anyone can raise orchids" led to the popularization of this hobby—not just the rich, but gardeners of every economic level began experimenting with orchids.

In May 1959, Wylie went to the then all-White Florida State University to give Wylie awards to two students who aspired to become librarians. The award presentation happened in front of a student crowd and Wylie "typically detoured" from his academic chore and stated: “I hope that in a third of a century not only will we be integrated and almost all racism will be a historic fact we read about in old books, but I hope we’ll be a lot further along toward all becoming tea-colored.”

Wylie's final works dealt with the potentially catastrophic effects of pollution and climate change. Notably, Wylie wrote "L.A. 2017", a 1971 episode of the television series The Name of the Game. The series was normally a contemporary drama; however, in this unique science fiction episode, the lead character awakens in a science-fiction dystopia, centered on a psychiatric/fascist government overseeing the underground-sheltered remnants of humanity, the aftermath of an environmental (pollution) catastrophe. The 90 minute episode was directed by Steven Spielberg, and featured Gene Barry, Barry Sullivan, Edmond O'Brien, Severn Darden and Sharon Farrell. Wylie wrote a near-simultaneous novelization of the story as Los Angeles: A.D. 2017.

Wylie's final novel, The End of the Dream, was published posthumously in 1972 and foresees a dark future where America slides into ecological catastrophe.

Wylie, and now the Philip Wylie estate, is represented by Harold Ober Associates.

== Personal life ==
Wylie married Sally Ondek, and had one child, Karen Pryor. After divorcing his first wife, he married Frederica Ballard, who was born and raised in Rushford, New York; they are both buried in Rushford.

Wylie's daughter, Karen Pryor, was an author who became the inventor of animal "clicker" training.

Wylie's niece Janice Wylie, the daughter of his brother Max Wylie, co-creator of The Flying Nun, was murdered, along with her roommate Emily Hoffert, in New York in August 1963, in what became known as the "Career Girls Murders" case.

== Death ==
While on vacation, Wylie died from a heart attack on October 25, 1971, in Miami. Some of his papers, writings, and other possessions are in the Department of Rare Books and Special Collections at Princeton University Library.

== Bibliography ==
=== Novels ===
- Arno, Peter (1927). Whoops, Dearie!. New York: Simon & Schuster. (Note: Ghostwritten by Wylie; credited to cartoonist Peter Arno, according to Maslin, Michael (2016). Peter Arno. New York: Regan Arts. p. 51.)
- Heavy Laden (1928)
- Babes and Sucklings (1929)
- Gladiator (New York, Alfred A. Knopf, 1930)
- The Murderer Invisible (1931)
- Footprint of Cinderella (1931)
- The Savage Gentleman (New York, Farrar & Rinehart, 1932)
- When Worlds Collide (1933) (with Edwin Balmer) – Earth is destroyed in a collision with the rogue planet Bronson Alpha, with about a year of warning enabling a small group of survivors to build a spacecraft and escape to the rogue planet's moon, Bronson Beta. Filmed, with major changes to the story, as When Worlds Collide (1951).
- After Worlds Collide (1934) (with Edwin Balmer) – Continues the story of When Worlds Collide, with both exploration of Bronson Beta and conflict with other groups of survivors.
- The Golden Hoard (1934)
- Finnley Wren (1934)
- The Smiling Corpse (1935) (detective fiction parody published anonymously but written primarily by Wylie, with Bernard A. Bergman)
- Too Much of Everything (1936)
- An April Afternoon (1938) (Note: OCLC 6505489) (Note: For commentary on this book, see: Wild, Peter (2011). Paradise of Desire: Eleven Palm Springs Novels. Tucson, AZ: Estate of Peter Wild. p. 281. OCLC 748584112.)
- The Other Horseman (1942)
- Corpses at Indian Stones (1943)
- Night Unto Night (1944), filmed in 1949, starring Ronald Reagan
- Opus 21 (1949)
- The Disappearance (1951) – An unexplained cosmic "blink" splits humanity along gender lines into two divergent timelines: from the men's perspective, all the women disappear and from the women's, all men vanish. The novel explores issues of gender role and sexual identity. It depicts an empowered condition for liberated women and a dystopia of an all-male world. Wylie's setting allows him to investigate the role of homosexuality in situations where no gender alternative exists. Producer George Pal was extremely interested in the story and purchased the option to it soon after publication. Because Pal wanted to emphasize its highly sexual nature and wanted to include nudity, Paramount executive Y. Frank Freeman refused to make the film. It remained in development hell as Pal repurchased the rights and took it to several studios. He continued working on it until his death in 1980.
- The Smuggled Atom Bomb (1951)
- Three to be Read (1951). Three suspense novellas from The Saturday Evening Post
- Tomorrow! (1954) – Nuclear war story centering on the atomic bombing of two fictional Midwest cities adjacent to each other in the mid-1950s; one has an effective Civil Defense program, the other does not.
- The Innocent Ambassadors (1957)
- They Both Were Naked (1963)
- Triumph (1963) – Nuclear war story involving a worst-case USA/USSR "spasm war" where both sides empty their arsenals into each other with extensive use of "dirty" bombs to maximize casualties, resulting in the main characters (in a very deep bomb shelter) being the only survivors in the entire Northern Hemisphere. A condensed version of this novel appeared in the Saturday Evening Post magazine.
- The Spy Who Spoke Porpoise (1969) – The President of the United States learns that there is a category of CIA files, code named Zed, to which he is not allowed access.
- Los Angeles: A.D. 2017 (1971) - A novelization of Wylie's "L.A. 2017", a 1971 episode of the television series The Name of the Game.
- The End of the Dream (1972)

=== Short stories ===
- Seeing New York by Kiddie Car (1926)
- Jungle Journey (1945)
- The Paradise Crater (1945)
- Blunder (1946)
- An Epistle to the Thessalonians (1950)
- Philadelphia Phase (1951)
- The Answer: A Fable for Our Times (1955)
- Ten Thousand Blunt Instruments and Other Mysteries (Crippen & Landru, 2010)

==== "Crunch and Des" collections ====
- The Big Ones Get Away (1940)
- Salt Water Daffy (1941)
- Fish and Tin Fish (1944)
- Selected Short Stories of Philip Wylie (1945)
- Crunch & Des: Stories of Florida Fishing (1948)
- The Best of Crunch & Des (1954)
- Treasure Cruise and other Stories (1956)
- Crunch & Des: Classic Stories about Saltwater Fishing (1990)

The Big Ones Get Away, Salt Water Daffy, Fish and Tin Fish and Selected Short Stories of Philip Wylie were published as Armed Services Editions during WWII, as were Night Unto Night and When Worlds Collide.

=== Non-fiction ===
- Generation of Vipers (1942)
- An Essay on Morals (1947)
- Denizens Of The Deep (1953)
- The Answer (1955)
- The Magic Animal (1968)
- Sons and Daughters of Mom (1971)

=== Essays/articles ===
The following is a partial list:

- "Why Colleges Fail Students" Saturday Evening Post (December 13, 1930)
- "The Quitter as Hero" Harper's Magazine (Oct. 1933)
- "Writing for the Movies" Harper's Magazine (Nov. 1933)
- "The Illiteracy of Educators" Saturday Review of Literature (June 3, 1944)
- "Sex and the Censor" Nation (July 8, 1944)
- "War and Peace in Miami" New Republic (1944)
- "Memorandum on Anti-Semitism" American Mercury (Jan. 1945)
- "Safe and Insane" The Atlantic (Jan. 1948)
- "How To Admire Writers" Atlantic (1950)
- "We Are Making a Circus of Death" Coronet (September 1959)
- "Medievalism and the MacArthurian Legend" Quarterly Journal of Speech (1951)
- "Panic, Psychology, and the Bomb" Bulletin of the Atomic Scientists (Feb. 1954)
- "Science Has Spoiled My Supper" The Atlantic Monthly (Apr, 1954)
- "The Mysterious Doctors of Bimini" Saturday Evening Post (1954)
- "The Crime of Mickey Spillane" Good Housekeeping (1955)
- "Predictions: 2001 A.D." (1956)
- "The Career Woman" Playboy (January 1963)
- "UFOs: The Sense and Nonsense" Popular Science (March 1967)
- "McNamara's Missile Defense: A Multi-Billion Dollar Fiasco?" Popular Science (Jan. 1968)
- "Who Killed Mankind?" Today's Health (Oct. 1970)

=== Poetry ===
List of poems

Title	Year	First published	Reprinted/collected
Outward bound	1926	[Uncredited] (January 2, 1926). "Outward bound". The New Yorker. 1 (46): 14.	
[Untitled]	1926	[Uncredited] (January 2, 1926). "[Untitled poem]". The New Yorker. 1 (46): 31.	First line: A coonskin coat

———————

Bibliography notes

== Films ==
- Island of Lost Souls (1932) screenplay
- Murders in the Zoo (1933) screenplay
- King of the Jungle (1933) screenplay
- Come On, Marines! (1934) story
- Death Flies East (1935) story
- Fair Warning (1937) story
- Under Suspicion (1937) story
- Second Honeymoon (1937) story
- The Gladiator (1938) based on novel
- Charlie Chan in Reno (1939) original story "Death Makes a Decree"
- The Smiling Ghost (1941) story - uncredited
- Springtime in the Rockies (1942) story
- Cinderella Jones (1946) story
- Night Unto Night (1949) novel
- When Worlds Collide (1951) novel
- Johnny Tiger (1966) co-screenplay

== TV series ==
- Crunch and Des was adapted for a syndicated TV series (37 episodes, 1955–1956) starring Forrest Tucker and Sandy Kenyon and filmed in Bermuda.
- An episode titled "L.A. 2017" (1971) of the television series The Name of the Game. A science-fiction dystopian episode, centered around a psychiatric / fascist government of an underground-sheltered remnant of humanity, in the aftermath of an environmental catastrophe (air pollution) that leaves the atmosphere unbreathable. Wylie wrote the novelization as Los Angeles: A.D. 2017.
