= List of The Name of the Game episodes =

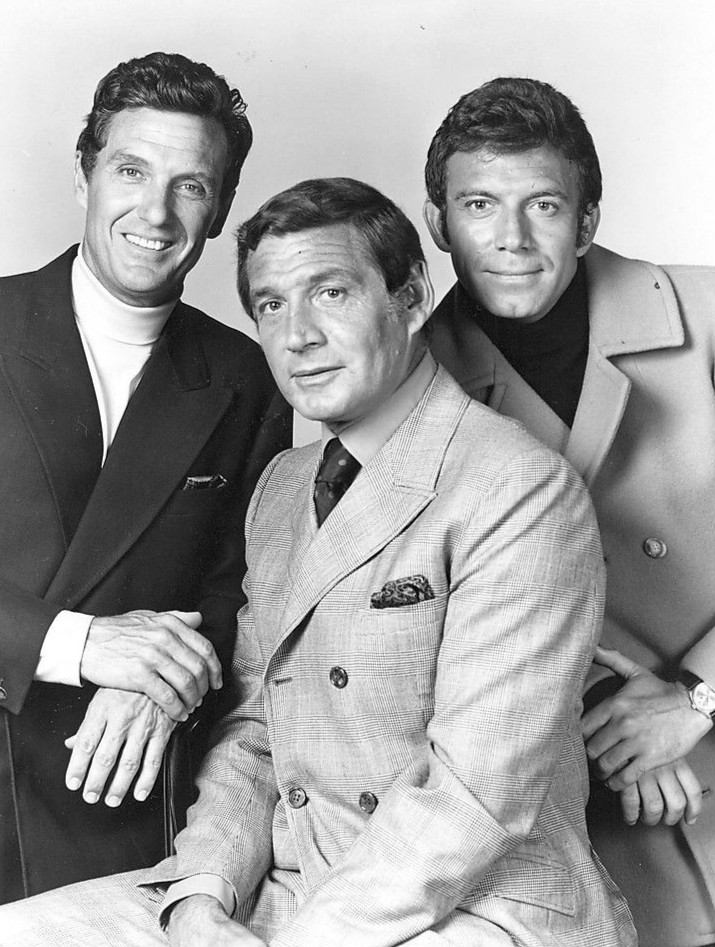
Robert Stack, Gene Barry and Tony Franciosa

This is a list of episodes for the NBC television series The Name of the Game. The star of almost every episode of this rotating series was either Gene Barry as Glenn Howard, Anthony Franciosa (credited as Tony Franciosa) as Jeff Dillon, or Robert Stack as Dan Farrell. After Franciosa was fired during the third season, the four remaining episodes for which he was contracted starred different actors (Robert Culp, Peter Falk, Robert Wagner) as other characters.

The pilot for this series was the 1966 TV-movie Fame Is the Name of the Game starring Franciosa, along with Susan Saint James (making her debut) and guest stars Jill St. John, Jack Klugman and Robert Duvall.

== Series overview ==
At present, this series has not been released on home video.

Season	Episodes	Originally released	
Season	Episodes	First released	Last released
1	26	September 20, 1968	March 20, 1969
2	26	September 19, 1969	April 10, 1970
3	24	September 18, 1970	March 19, 1971

The first-season episode "Pineapple Rose" starred actor Cliff Potts rather than one of the usual leads; the episode was written for Tony Franciosa's character, but Francosia refused to appear in it. The episode was produced by the Tony Franciosa segment team, but the opening theme identified it as a Gene Barry segment due to Barry's cameo appearance in the episode. Second-season episodes "Goodbye Harry" starred Darren McGavin and "Man of The People" starred Vera Miles. Each included Gene Barry in a cameo appearance and was featured as one of Barry's regular rotating segments.

The second-season episode "The King of Denmark" co-starred Tony Franciosa and Susan Saint James (who was given the bigger role in this one episode).

In the third season, Robert Culp (two episodes), Peter Falk and Robert Wagner substituted as "special guest leads" for four episodes in Franciosa's place. Gene Barry appeared in the Falk and Wagner episodes, and the first of Culp's two shows. The episode "A Capitol Affair" featured guest lead Suzanne Pleshette with Gene Barry providing a cameo.

== Episodes ==
=== Season 1 (1968–69) ===
No. overall	No. in season	Title	Starring	Directed by	Written by	Recurring cast	Original release date
1	1	"Fear of High Places"	Anthony Franciosa	William A. Graham	Mark Rodgers	Susan Saint James, Gene Barry	September 20, 1968
2	2	"Witness"	Robert Stack	Lamont Johnson	Dick Nelson (teleplay), Robert E. Thompson (story)	Susan Saint James, Gene Barry, Ben Murphy	September 27, 1968
3	3	"The Taker"	Gene Barry	Harvey Hart	Richard Levinson & William Link	Anthony Franciosa, Cliff Potts	October 4, 1968
4	4	"Collector's Edition"	Anthony Franciosa	Leslie Stevens	Eric Peters & Leslie Stevens (teleplay), Eric Peters (story)	Susan Saint James, Gene Barry	October 11, 1968
5	5	"Nightmare"	Robert Stack	Alvin Ganzer	Ed Adamson	Gene Barry, Ben Murphy	October 18, 1968
6	6	"Incident in Berlin"	Gene Barry	Seymour Robbie	Richard Levinson & William Link	Cliff Potts	October 25, 1968
7	7	"Shine On, Shine On, Jesse Gil"	Anthony Franciosa	Leslie Stevens	James M. Miller	Susan Saint James, Gene Barry	November 1, 1968
8	8	"Lola in Lipstick"	Gene Barry	Don Taylor	Peter Penduik	--	November 8, 1968
9	9	"The Protector"	Gene Barry	Richard Irving	Jack Miller	Susan Saint James, Cliff Potts	November 15, 1968
10	10	"The Ordeal"	Robert Stack	Ralph Senensky	Alvin Sapinsley	Susan Saint James, Ben Murphy	November 22, 1968
11	11	"The White Birch"	Gene Barry	Lamont Johnson	Dean Hargrove and Luther Davis (teleplay), Robert Soderberg (story)	Susan Saint James	November 29, 1968
12	12	"High on a Rainbow"	Robert Stack	Richard A. Colla	Irving Pearlberg & Robert L. Collins (teleplay), Bill Davidson (story)	Gene Barry, Susan Saint James, Ben Murphy	December 6, 1968
13	13	"The Black Answer"	Anthony Franciosa	Leslie Stevens	Leslie Stevens	Susan Saint James	December 13, 1968
14	14	"Pineapple Rose"	+Cliff Potts	Nicholas Colasanto	Richard Neubert	Susan Saint James, Gene Barry	December 20, 1968
15	15	"The Revolutionary"	Gene Barry	Seymour Robbie	Ronald Austin & James D. Buchanan	--	December 27, 1968
16	16	"Swingers Only"	Robert Stack	Barry Shear	Anthony Spinner (teleplay), Mark Rodgers (story)	Ben Murphy	January 10, 1969
17	17	"The Inquiry"	Gene Barry	Sutton Roley	Harold Livingston	--	January 17, 1969
18	18	"The Incomparable Connie Walker"	Anthony Franciosa	Abner Biberman	Leslie Stevens	Susan Saint James, Gene Barry	January 24, 1969
19	19	"Love-In at Ground Zero"	Gene Barry	Richard Irving	Shimon Wincelberg and Dean Hargrove (teleplay), Shimon Wincelberg (story)	Cliff Potts	January 31, 1969
20	20	"The Suntan Mob"	Robert Stack	Alexander Singer	Robert Buckner and Dick Nelson (teleplay), Robert Buckner (story)	--	February 7, 1969
21	21	"Keep the Doctor Away"	Anthony Franciosa	Barry Shear	Robert Malcolm Young	Susan Saint James	February 14, 1969
22	22	"The Bobby Currier Story"	Robert Stack	Lamont Johnson	Robert Collins	Susan Saint James, Gene Barry	February 21, 1969
23	23	"A Wrath of Angels"	Robert Stack	Alvin Ganzer	Dick Nelson & Gilbert Ralston (teleplay), Anthony Spinner (story)	Ben Murphy	February 28, 1969
24	24	"The Third Choice"	Gene Barry	Seymour Robbie	Jack Miller	Cliff Potts	March 7, 1969
25	25	"Breakout to a Fast Buck"	Robert Stack	Michael Caffey	Sy Salkowitz	Susan Saint James, Ben Murphy	March 14, 1969
26	26	"An Agent of the Plaintiff"	Gene Barry	John Llewellyn Moxey	Marion Hargrove & Dean Hargrove (teleplay), Gerry Day (story)	Susan Saint James	March 20, 1969

- + A recurring cast member stars in this episode.

=== Season 2 (1969–70) ===
No. overall	No. in season	Title	Starring	Directed by	Written by	Recurring cast	Original release date
27	1	"Lady on the Rocks"	Gene Barry	John Llewellyn Moxey	Phyllis White & Robert White	--	September 19, 1969
28	2	"A Hard Case of the Blues"	Robert Stack	Barry Shear	Philip DeGuere Jr.	Ben Murphy	September 26, 1969
29	3	"Blind Man's Bluff"	Anthony Franciosa	James Neilson	Henry Slesar	Susan Saint James	October 3, 1969
30	4	"The Emissary"	Gene Barry	John Llewellyn Moxey	Margaret Armen and Dean Hargrove	Susan Saint James	October 10, 1969
31	5	"Chains of Command"	Robert Stack	Robert Day	Carol Sobieski	Ben Murphy	October 17, 1969
32	6	"Good-bye Harry"	*Darren McGavin	Barry Shear	Gene L. Coon	Susan Saint James, Gene Barry	October 24, 1969
33	7	"Give Till It Hurts"	Robert Stack	Marc Daniels	William D. Gordon (teleplay), Walter Brough (story)	Ben Murphy	October 31, 1969
34	8	"The Perfect Image"	Gene Barry	Sutton Roley	David P. Harmon (teleplay), Anthony Spinner (story)	Susan Saint James	November 7, 1969
35	9	"The Prisoner Within"	Anthony Franciosa	Oscar Rudolph	Richard Landau (written by)	Susan Saint James	November 14, 1969
36	10	"The Civilized Men"	Robert Stack	Unknown	Unknown	--	November 28, 1969
37	11	"High Card"	Gene Barry	Sutton Roley	Herman Groves, Dean Hargrove and Mitch Lindemann	Cliff Potter	December 5, 1969
38	12	"The Power"	Robert Stack	Lawrence Dobkin	Arthur Weingarten	--	December 12, 1969
39	13	"Laurie Marie"	Anthony Franciosa	Harvey Hart	David P. Harmon and Henry Slesar (teleplay), Henry Slesar (story)	Susan Saint James	December 19, 1969
40	14	"The Tradition"	Gene Barry	John Llewellyn Moxey	Tim Kelly and Dean Hargrove (teleplay), Tim Kelly (story)	Susan Saint James	January 2, 1970
41	15	"The Brass Ring"	Robert Stack	Barry Shear	Barry Oringer	--	January 9, 1970
42	16	"Island of Gold and Precious Stones"	Anthony Franciosa	John Newland	Anthony Skene	Susan Saint James	January 16, 1970
43	17	"The Takeover"	Gene Barry	Herb Kenwith	John McGreevey and Ernestine Barton (teleplay), John McGreevey (story)	--	January 23, 1970
44	18	"The Garden"	Robert Stack	Seymour Robbie	Charles McDaniel	--	January 30, 1970
45	19	"Tarot"	Gene Barry	Nicholas Colasanato	Dick Nelson (teleplay), Blake Lund & Phil Hargrove (story)	Susan Saint James	February 13, 1970
46	20	"The King of Denmark"	+Susan Saint James	Leo Penn	Anthony Skene	Anthony Franciosa	February 20, 1970
47	21	"The Skin Game"	Robert Stack	Unknown	Unknown	Ben Murphy	February 27, 1970
48	22	"Man of the People"	*Vera Miles	Unknown	Elinor Karpf	Gene Barry	March 6, 1970
49	23	"Echo of a Nightmare"	Robert Stack	John Newland	Don Brinkley	Susan Saint James, Ben Murphy	March 20, 1970
50	24	"Jenny Wilde Is Drowning"	Anthony Franciosa	Boris Sagal	Henry Slesar and Stanford Whitmore (teleplay), Henry Slesar (story)	Susan Saint James	March 27, 1970
51	25	"One of the Girls in Research"	Gene Barry	Sutton Roley	Marion Hargrove	--	April 3, 1970
52	26	"The Other Kind of Spy"	Anthony Franciosa	Boris Sagal	Chester Krumholz	Susan Saint James	April 10, 1970

- + A recurring cast member stars in this episode.
- * A special guest is the star of this episode.

=== Season 3 (1970–71) ===
No. overall	No. in season	Title	Starring	Directed by	Written by	Recurring cast	Original release date
53	1	"So Long, Baby, and Amen"	Robert Stack	Marvin Chomsky	Steven Bochco	Mark Miller	September 18, 1970
54	2	"A Love to Remember"	Gene Barry	Nicholas Colasanto	Dick Nelson (teleplay), Richard M. Bluel (story)	Susan Saint James	September 25, 1970
55	3	"Cynthia Is Alive and Living in Avalon"	*Robert Culp	Gene Levitt	Ben Masselink	Gene Barry, Susan Saint James	October 2, 1970
56	4	"Battle at Gannon's Bridge"	Robert Stack	Robert Day	Herb Meadow	--	October 9, 1970
57	5	"The Enemy Before Us"	Anthony Franciosa	Barry Shear	Joseph Calvelli	Susan Saint James	October 16, 1970
58	6	"The Time Is Now"	Gene Barry	Nicholas Colasanto	Wanda Coleman	--	October 23, 1970
59	7	"The War Merchants"	Robert Stack	Boris Sagal	William D. Gordon	Susan Saint James	October 30, 1970
60	8	"Little Bear Died Running"	*Robert Culp	Gene Levitt	Edward J. Lakso	Susan Saint James	November 6, 1970
61	9	"All the Old Familiar Faces"	Gene Barry	Seymour Robbie	Phil Hargrove	Susan Saint James, Mark Miller	November 13, 1970
62	10	"I Love You, Billy Baker: Part 1"	Anthony Franciosa	Barry Shear	Richard DeRoy	Susan Saint James	November 20, 1970
63	11	"I Love You, Billy Baker: Part 2"	Anthony Franciosa	Barry Shear	Richard DeRoy	Susan Saint James	November 27, 1970
64	12	"Why I Blew Up Dakota"	Robert Stack	John Newland	Ken Trevey	Susan Saint James, Mark Miller	December 4, 1970
65	13	"Aquarius Descending"	Gene Barry	Nicholas Colasanto	Dick Nelson (teleplay); Dick Nelson (story); Barry Oringer (teleplay)	--	December 11, 1970
66	14	"The Glory Shouter"	Robert Stack	Joseph Pevney	Harry Kronman (teleplay); Edward DeBlasio (teleplay); Harry Kronman (story)	Susan Saint James	December 18, 1970
67	15	"A Sister from Napoli"	*Peter Falk	Barry Shear	Stanley Adams, Peter Allan Fields and George F. Slavin	Gene Barry	January 8, 1971
68	16	"LA 2017"	Gene Barry	Steven Spielberg	Philip Wylie	--	January 15, 1971
69	17	"The Man Who Killed a Ghost"	*Robert Wagner	Barry Shear	Ken Trevey (written by)	Gene Barry	January 29, 1971
70	18	"Seek and Destroy"	Robert Stack	Robert Day	Richard Landau (written by)	--	February 5, 1971
71	19	"A Capitol Affair"	*Suzanne Pleshette	Marvin J. Chomsky	Richard DeRoy	Gene Barry	February 12, 1971
72	20	"The Savage Eye"	Robert Stack	Leo Penn	Leon Tokatyan	Susan Saint James	February 19, 1971
73	21	"Appointment in Palermo"	Gene Barry	Ben Gazzara	Joseph Calvelli	--	February 26, 1971
74	22	"Beware of the Watchdog"	Robert Stack	Marvin J. Chomsky	Jack Turley (teleplay), James M. Miller & Jack Turley (story)	Susan Saint James, Mark Miller	March 5, 1971
75	23	"The Broken Puzzle"	Gene Barry	Alvin Ganzer	Pat Fielder (teleplay)Barry Oringer (story)	--	March 12, 1971
76	24	"The Showdown"	Gene Barry	Daniel Petrie	Dick Nelson (teleplay), Robert Sabaroff (story)	--	March 19, 1971

- * A special guest is the star of this episode.

== Sources ==
- The Name of the Game at IMDb
