= Worlds in Collision (disambiguation) =

Worlds in Collision is a 1950 book by Immanuel Velikovsky.

Worlds in Collision may also refer to:

- Worlds in Collision (album), an album and its title track by Pere Ubu
- "Worlds in Collision", a song by God Is an Astronaut from the album Age of the Fifth Sun

== See also ==
- When Worlds Collide (disambiguation)
