= The Breath of Scandal =

1924 film

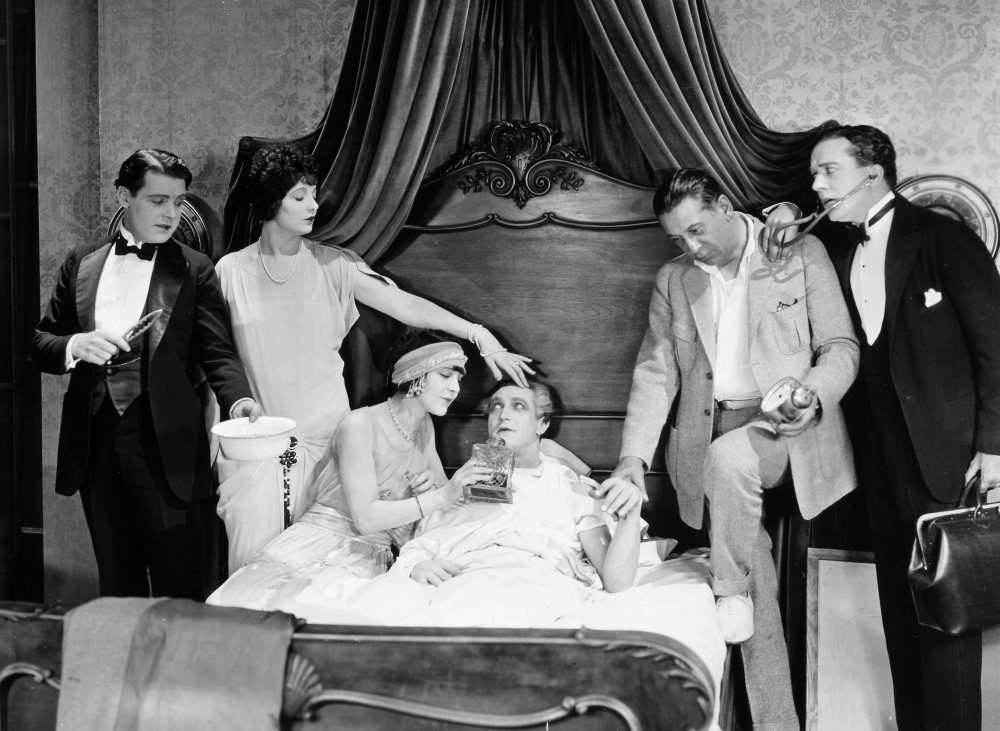
- A rare official still from the film
- Directed by: Louis J. Gasnier
- Written by: Eve Unsell
- Based on: The Breath of Scandal by Edwin Balmer
- Produced by: B.P. Schulberg
- Starring: Betty Blythe; Patsy Ruth Miller; Jack Mulhall
- Cinematography: Harry Perry
- Production company: B.P. Schulberg Productions
- Distributed by: Preferred Pictures
- Release date: September 1, 1924
- Running time: 70 minutes
- Country: United States
- Language: Silent (English intertitles)

The Breath of Scandal is a 1924 American silent drama film directed by Louis J. Gasnier and starring Betty Blythe, Patsy Ruth Miller, and Jack Mulhall. It is based on the 1922 novel of the same title by Edwin Balmer.

== Cast ==
- Betty Blythe as Sybil Russell
- Patsy Ruth Miller as Marjorie Hale
- Jack Mulhall as Bill Wallace
- Myrtle Stedman as Helen Hale
- Lou Tellegen as Charles Hale
- Forrest Stanley as Gregg Mowbry
- Frank Leigh as Sybil's husband
- Phyllis Haver as Clara Simmons
- Charles Clary as Atherton Bruce

== Preservation ==
With no prints of The Breath of Scandal located in any film archives, it is a lost film.

== Bibliography ==
- Robert B. Connelly. The Silents: Silent Feature Films, 1910-36, Volume 40, Issue 2. December Press, 1998. ISBN 978-0-9132-0436-8
