= Nobody's Real =

Single by Powerman 5000

from the album Tonight the Stars Revolt! and End of Days: Original Movie Soundtrack
- Released: November 2, 1999
- Genre: Industrial metal; nu metal
- Length: 2:54
- Label: DreamWorks; Geffen; WMG
- Composer: Powerman 5000
- Lyricist: Spider One
- Producers: Sylvia Massy; Ulrich Wild; Powerman 5000

Powerman 5000 singles chronology
"When Worlds Collide" (1999)	"Nobody's Real" (1999)	"Supernova Goes Pop" (2000)

Music video
- "Nobody's Real" on YouTube

"Nobody's Real" is a song by Powerman 5000 from the album Tonight the Stars Revolt!. It was used on the soundtrack of the film End of Days. On the band's tour in early 2000, they performed the song in a modified version for their encores.

== Music video ==
A music video was made in which a young boy discovers a robotic mask that grants him supernatural powers. The video was directed by David Meyers and Spider One.

== Track listing ==
No.	Title	Length
1.	"Nobody's Real"	2:54

== Charts ==
Chart (1999–2000)	Peak position
U.S. Billboard Modern Rock Tracks	23
U.S. Billboard Mainstream Rock Tracks	18
