= End of Days (soundtrack) =

Music From and Inspired by the Motion Picture End of Days

Soundtrack album by Various artists
- Released: November 2, 1999
- Genres: Alternative metal; industrial rock; nu metal; hardcore hip hop
- Length: 53:51
- Label: Geffen
- Producer: Jordan Schur (exec.)

Singles from End of Days
- 1. "Nobody's Real" Released: November 2, 1999

Professional ratings
Review scores
Source	Rating
AllMusic	1.5/5 stars
Entertainment Weekly	B+

Music From and Inspired by the Motion Picture End of Days is the soundtrack to Peter Hyams' 1999 film End of Days. It was released on November 2, 1999 via Geffen Records, and primarily contains tracks by alternative metal and industrial rock bands. It features the first song released by the "new line-up" of Guns N' Roses, the industrial-rock "Oh My God". During End of Days's editing, soundtrack songs were overlaid in scenes that are typically silent in thriller films. A sample from Spectrasonics' "Symphony of Voices" is heard in several scenes.

The album peaked at number 16 in Canada and at number 20 in the United States.

== Track listing ==
No.	Title	Writer(s)	Producer(s)	Length
1.	"Camel Song" (performed by Korn)	Jonathan Davis; James Shaffer; Reginald Arvizu; David Silveria; Brian Welch	Toby Wright; Steve Thompson; Korn	4:21
2.	"So Long" (performed by Everlast)	Erik Schrody	Danny Lohner; Everlast	4:59
3.	"Slow" (performed by Professional Murder Music)	Roman Marisak; Brian Harrah; Jeff Schartoff; Justin Bennett	Toby Wright; Professional Murder Music	3:58
4.	"Crushed" (performed by Limp Bizkit)	Fred Durst	Fred Durst; DJ Lethal	3:24
5.	"Oh My God" (performed by Guns N' Roses)	W. Axl Rose; Paul Tobias; Darren Arthur Reed; Joshua Freese; Thomas Stinson; Sean Riggs	Sean Beavan; Axl Rose (co.)	3:40
6.	"Poison" (performed by The Prodigy)	Liam Howlett; Keith Palmer	Liam Howlett	6:14
7.	"Superbeast (Girl On a Motorcycle Mix)" (performed by Rob Zombie)	Robert Cummings; Scott Humphrey	Scott Humphrey; Rob Zombie; Charlie Clouser	3:51
8.	"Bad Influence" (performed by Eminem)	Marshall Mathers; Jeff Bass; Mark Bass	Bass Brothers	3:40
9.	"Nobody's Real" (performed by Powerman 5000)	Michael Cummings	Sylvia Massy; Powerman 5000; Scott Humphrey (co.)	2:54
10.	"I Wish I Had" (performed by Stroke)	John Barry; Don Black; Jason Kelly	Steve Hitchcock	6:34
11.	"Sugar Kane" (performed by Sonic Youth)	Kim Gordon; Thurston Moore; Lee Ranaldo; Steve Shelley	Butch Vig	5:58
12.	"Wrong Way" (performed by Creed)	Scott Stapp; Mark Tremonti	John Kurzweg	4:18
Total length:				53:51

== Chart history ==
Chart (1999)	Peak position
Canadian Albums (Billboard)	16
US Billboard 200	20

== Certifications ==
Region	Certification	Certified units/sales
Canada (Music Canada)	Gold	50,000^{^}
United States (RIAA)	Platinum	1,000,000^{^}
^{^} Shipments figures based on certification alone.
