= The Breath of Scandal (novel) =

1922 novel by Edwin Balmer

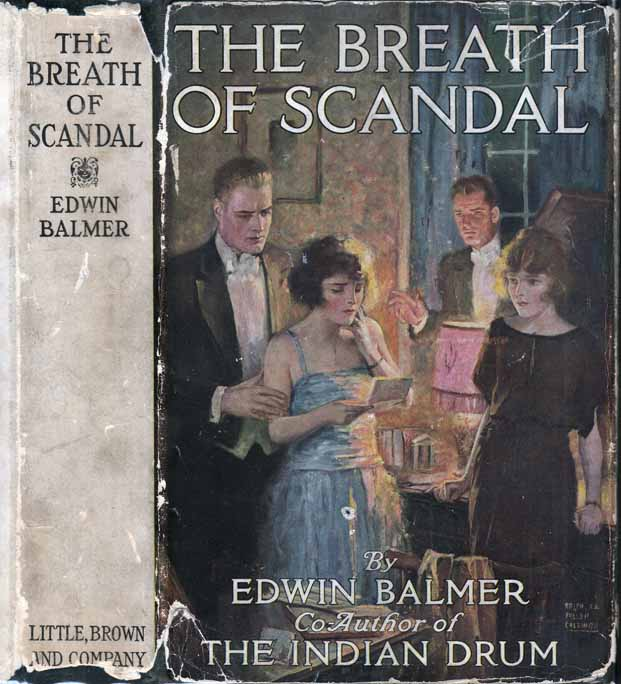
- First edition
- Author: Edwin Balmer
- Language: English
- Genre: Drama
- Publisher: Little, Brown and Company
- Publication date: 1922
- Publication place: United States
- Media type: Print

The Breath of Scandal is a 1922 novel by the American writer Edwin Balmer.

In 1924 it was adapted into a silent film of the same title directed by Louis J. Gasnier and starring Betty Blythe.

== Bibliography ==
- Goble, Alan. The Complete Index to Literary Sources in Film. Walter de Gruyter, 1999.
- Smith, Geoffrey D. American Fiction, 1901-1925: A Bibliography. Cambridge University Press, 1997.
