= The Answer: A Fable for Our Times =

The Answer: A Fable for Our Times is a 1955 anti-war science fiction novella by Philip Wylie.

The US and USSR are conducting nuclear tests and both discover they have killed an Angel in the form of a beautiful young boy. Initially both sides suspect each other, but they ultimately discover that the message is the Answer to all man's dilemmas - love one another.
