= The Name of the Game (TV series) =

American television series (1968–1971)

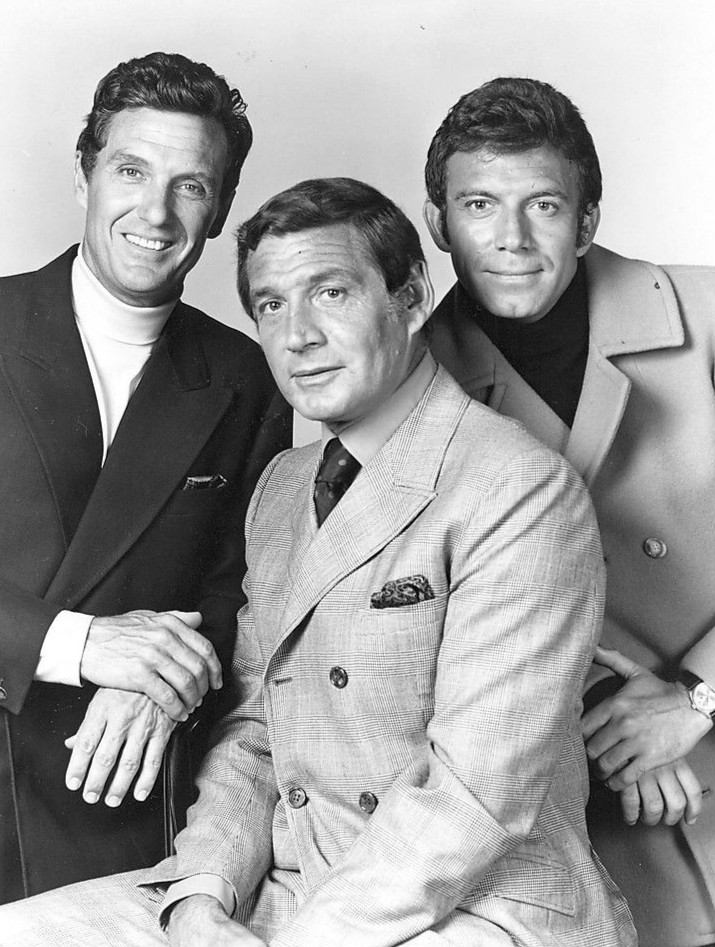
- The Name of the Game's three "headline" stars, shown here from left to right, were Robert Stack, Gene Barry, and Tony Franciosa.
- Created by: Jennings Lang
- Starring: Tony Franciosa; Gene Barry; Robert Stack; Peter Falk; Robert Culp; Robert Wagner; Darren McGavin; Susan Saint James; Mark Miller; Ben Murphy; Cliff Potts
- Theme music composer: Dave Grusin
- Country of origin: United States
- No. of seasons: 3
- No. of episodes: 76 (list of episodes)

Production
- Executive producers: Richard Irving; David Victor; Leslie Stevens; Dean Hargrove
- Running time: 90 minutes
- Production company: Universal Television

Original release
- Network: NBC
- Release: September 20, 1968 – March 19, 1971

The Name of the Game is an American television series starring Tony Franciosa, Gene Barry, and Robert Stack, which aired from 1968 to 1971 on NBC, totaling 76 episodes of 90 minutes each. The show was a wheel series, setting the stage for The Bold Ones and The NBC Mystery Movie in the 1970s. The program had the largest budget of any television series at that time.

== Plot ==
The series was based on the 1966 television movie Fame Is the Name of the Game, which was directed by Stuart Rosenberg and starred Tony Franciosa. The Name of the Game rotated among three characters working at Howard Publications, a large magazine publishing company—Jeffrey "Jeff" Dillon (Franciosa), a crusading reporter with People magazine (not to be confused with the real-life periodical that debuted in 1974); Glenn Howard (Gene Barry, taking over for George Macready, who had originated the role in the earlier film), the sophisticated, well-connected publisher; and Daniel "Dan" Farrell (Robert Stack), the editor of Crime magazine. Then-newcomer Susan Saint James, as Peggy Maxwell, served as research assistant to each of the lead characters for nearly half the episodes, providing for some continuity.

== Cast ==
=== Main cast ===
- Tony Franciosa as Jeff Dillon (seasons 1–2, first half of season 3)

Dillon is seen in 15 episodes as the lead, and as a supporting player in two other episodes.

- Gene Barry as Glenn Howard

Howard is seen in 27 episodes as the lead, and as a supporting player in 14 other episodes.

- Robert Stack as Dan Farrell

Farrell is seen in 26 episodes as the lead.

- Susan Saint James as Peggy Maxwell

Maxwell is seen in 38 episodes as a supporting character and has the lead role in one other episode.

- Cliff Potts (credited as Cliff Potter) as Andy Hill (seasons 1–2)

Hill is seen in 6 episodes as a supporting character and has the lead role in one other episode.

- Ben Murphy as Joe Sample (seasons 1–2)

Sample is seen in 12 episodes as a supporting character. As an assistant to Dan Farrell, the character of Sample only appears in Farrell's episodes.

- Mark Miller as Ross Craig (season 3)

Craig is seen in 4 episodes as a supporting character.

- Jo de Winter as Helena

Helena appears in 4 episodes as a supporting character. As an executive secretary working for Glenn Howard, the character of Helena only appears in Howard's episodes.

=== Guest cast ===
- Darren McGavin as Sam Hardy (second season, 1 episode only)
- Vera Miles as Hilary Vanderman (second season, 1 episode only)
- Robert Culp as Paul Tyler (third season, 2 episodes only)
- Peter Falk as Lewis Corbett (third season, 1 episode only)
- Robert Wagner as David Corey (third season, 1 episode only)
- Suzanne Pleshette as Hallie Manville (third season,1 episode only)

== Production ==
=== Development ===
The Name of the Game provided Steven Spielberg with his first long-form directing assignment: the dystopian science fiction episode, "L.A. 2017," written by Philip Wylie. (He had also written Barry's memorable offbeat episode of the first season, "Love-In at Ground Zero.") In the episode directed by Spielberg, Glenn Howard is hunted down in a lethally polluted Los Angeles of the future, where the fascist government is ruled by psychiatrists and the populace has been driven to live in underground bunkers to survive. But at the end, Howard wakes up to discover that it was a dream; this device allowed the science-fiction plot to fit into the modern-day setting of the show.

Steven Bochco received one of his first writing credits on the series and served as story editor for the third-season Robert Stack episodes.

Segment Producers / Executive Producers included David Victor (The Man from U.N.C.L.E. etc.), Dean Hargrove (U.N.C.L.E., Perry Mason Returns, Diagnosis: Murder etc.), Gene L. Coon (Star Trek etc.), and Leslie Stevens (The Outer Limits, Mystery Movies etc.)

The Universal Studios headquarters building was used for the exterior shots of the "Howard Publications" building.

=== Opening titles ===
The show's opening graphic used each actor's name, zoomed out to form a line drawing of the face of each of the primary stars in turn, with the face each time being formed out of repetitions of the star's name, accompanied by a jazzy, pulsating theme by Dave Grusin. This graphic originally put the featured lead first, then the other two as "starring in ...", Franciosa set on pale blue background, Barry on red, and Stack on green. All three leads were thus depicted, although usually only one appeared per episode. Each episode carried individual credits, with the featured lead name "in" followed by title and guest cast.

Episodes where Barry was the lead, or a "special guest" on episodes with guest "reporters", originally had the opening graphic order as "Barry–Franciosa–Stack". Similarly, Franciosa's installments originally had the rotational order as "Franciosa–Stack–Barry".

When the show ran on the Encore Mystery channel between 1996 and 1999, a single "Stack–Barry–Franciosa" opening graphic (originally used only on those episodes in which Stack starred) was shown on nearly every episode. (But "Keep the Doctor Away", "Goodbye Harry", "The Takeover", and "The Tradition" each retained their original correct rotation order, respectively). This single graphic also preceded almost all except those four episodes on re-runs which Cozi TV aired in 2014.

=== Jeff Dillon (Tony Franciosa) ===
Franciosa's "Jeff Dillon" segments were "current affairs" stories that ranged from industrial espionage ("The Other Kind of Spy"), to medical fraud and malpractice ("Keep the Doctor Away"), racial tensions ("The Black Answer"), or shady goings-on in an Army training camp ("The Prisoner Within"). The charismatic Jeff Dillon was a stylish, charming character with a boyish smile, a razor-sharp mind with an attention to detail, and a dogged, persistent investigative style later used by (and subsequently more strongly associated with) the 1970s Mystery Movie character Columbo. Susan Saint James's award-winning character, research assistant "Peggy Maxwell," was an ever-present supporting character in the "Jeff Dillon" segments (except the third-season episode 'The Enemy Before Us' where Dillon returned to his New York home). She shared the lead with him on one occasion, in the season two episode "The King of Denmark." (she had a 'one off' greater starring role in this but was billed second in the episode credits).

=== Glenn Howard (Gene Barry) ===
Barry's "Glenn Howard" was a cool, self-made businessman who cut an elegant, impeccable, playboy millionaire figure, similar to his longer-running character of Amos Burke in Burke's Law. His tales usually involved big business ("The Perfect Image") or political intrigue ("High Card") set in powerful, wealthy circles. Howard also had a small but memorable number of more surreal "offbeat" escapades, such as "Love-In At Ground Zero," in which he was abducted by fanatical hippies and forced to witness their protest mass suicide during a secret chemical weapons test, and the aforementioned, Steven Spielberg-directed "L.A. 2017", which appeared at first to shift the series into the genre of science fiction. Other memorable episodes included the spooky "Tarot," the wild "One of The Girls in Research," and the Western set episode "The Showdown." Howard's assistant, "Andrew Hill" (Cliff Potts), appeared in some first-season episodes. Mark Miller was featured as "Ross Craig" in some Howard tales.

=== Dan Farrell (Robert Stack) ===
Stack's "Dan Farrell" was a resolute, stern ex-F.B.I. investigator, a righteous figure with a tireless sense of justice, which recalled his previous role as Federal Agent Eliot Ness in The Untouchables. Farrell's character had a tragic edge, unlike his two co-stars, as he was a widower. His wife's murder was shown, in flashback, in the first-season episode "Nightmare," which explained his more serious attitude. His stories were normally crime capers, often unusual types, such as spree killers ("The Bobby Currier Story"), corruption in sport ("Brass Ring") or "televangelism" ("The Glory Shouter"), illegal use of prisoners as slave labor ("Chains of Command"), and crooked charities ("Give till It Hurts"). Most Stack episodes concluded with a negative image that transformed into the most recent cover shot of Crime Magazine.

==== Franciosa's departure and replacements ====
Franciosa refused to appear in season one's "Pineapple Rose", which was hurriedly rewritten to feature Cliff Potts. Contemporary press articles reported that Franciosa was leaving the show at this time, but the situation was resolved, although Franciosa was seen in far fewer first season episodes than either Stack or Berry.

Franciosa was permanently fired during the third season of the show's run due to erratic behavior during production of the episode "I Love You, Billy Baker." His other four contracted rotation stories were taken by guest actors: Robert Culp as Paul Tyler in "Cynthia Is Alive and Living in Avalon" and "Little Bear Died Running," Peter Falk as Lewis Corbett in "A Sister from Napoli," and Robert Wagner as Dave Corey in "The Man Who Killed a Ghost." These episodes duly created the impression of Howard Publications being a large concern with many top reporters. Franciosa's face was still featured on the opening graphic for season three, with the guest leads billed as, 'Guest Starring in ...', then depicted with photos (from each episode) set on the closing credits as background.

According to writer Richard DeRoy, his teleplay for the third-season episode "A Capitol Affair" was intended to establish Suzanne Pleshette as a new permanent character, gossip columnist Hallie Manville. However, the episode was made toward the very end of the series run (as the 71st of 76 episodes), and Pleshette did not return as Manville in any of the few remaining episodes. The same episode included a role intended for Joan Crawford, but Crawford fell ill and was replaced by Mercedes McCambridge.

=== Continuity ===
The three series leads (Tony Franciosa, Gene Barry and Robert Stack) never appeared on screen together in any episode. Barry made brief cameo appearances "as Glenn Howard," for series continuity purposes, in four of Stack's episodes ('Nightmare', 'Witness', 'The Bobby Currier Story' and 'High on A Rainbow') and four of Franciosa's first-season episodes ('Fear of High Places', 'Connie Walker', 'Collector's Edition', and 'Shine on Jesse Gil'). Franciosa did likewise "as Jeff Dillon" in a single first-season Barry segment story, "The Taker." However, Stack and Franciosa never appeared in the same episode. Stack's character of Dan Farrell was mentioned by name in the Franciosa episode, "Collector's Edition," in which Barry cameoed, and Peggy Maxwell phoned Farrell, but he was not seen. This is the closest the show ever came to including all the three leads. Stack never made any cameo appearances in the other two leads' episodes. Barry also cameos in the third season Robert Culp 'subbing' for Franciosa episode; 'Cynthia is Alive...' appearing at the start and end of the episode.

In the first season there were eleven Barry segments, nine Stack segments, and six Franciosa segments. The rotating order of the lead actors' episodes was inconsistent over the three seasons; sometimes Barry or Stack appeared for two consecutive weeks running, while it was not unusual for Stack and Barry episodes to alternate repeatedly, with no Franciosa story between. Toward the end of season two, there were two Franciosa episodes only two weeks apart, suggesting that the show's original transmission order was possibly rushed.

=== Casting ===
Some notable supporting stars included Ben Murphy as Farrell's assistant Joseph Sample; Cliff Potts as Howard's assistant Andrew Hill, taking a one-off lead role in season one's "Pineapple Rose" episode. Mark Miller played Howard's other executive assistant Ross Craig, who also appeared in a few Robert Stack segment episodes. Darren McGavin took a guest lead as freelance newsman Sam Hardy (in "Goodbye Harry"), and Vera Miles likewise as Howard's top female reporter, Hilary Vanderman (in "Man of The People"). These three episodes all featured Gene Barry in cameos and were put under his segment.

Other guest stars included (alphabetically): Dana Andrews, Martin Balsam, Anne Baxter, Honor Blackman, Charles Boyer, Rossano Brazzi, Joanna Cameron, Hoagy Carmichael, David Carradine, Ray Charles, Chuck Connors, Joseph Cotten, Broderick Crawford, Nigel Davenport, Sammy Davis Jr., Yvonne De Carlo, Brandon deWilde, Ivan Dixon, Pete Duel, Sharon Farrell, Barbara Feldon, Jose Ferrer, Steve Forrest, Pamela Franklin, Zsa Zsa Gabor, Sean Garrison, Will Geer, Frank Gorshin, Robert Goulet, Lee Grant, Peter Graves, Julie Harris, Noel Harrison, Burl Ives, Van Johnson, Shirley Jones, Louis Jourdan, Boris Karloff, Jack Kelly, John Kerr, Jack Klugman, Peter Lawford, Dorothy Lamour, Gypsy Rose Lee, Claudine Longet, Kevin McCarthy, Roddy McDowall, Sal Mineo, Ricardo Montalbán, Laurence Naismith, Barry Nelson, Leslie Nielsen, Susan Oliver, Suzanne Pleshette, Pernell Roberts, Simon Scott, William Shatner, Frank Sinatra, Barry Sullivan, Donald Sutherland, Russ Tamblyn, Mel Torme, Ike & Tina Turner, Lurene Tuttle, Jessica Walter, Dionne Warwick, Dennis Weaver, Robert Webber, James Whitmore, Jill Townsend, Brenda Vaccaro, and Robert Young.

== Episodes ==
Season	Episodes	Originally released	
Season	Episodes	First released	Last released
1	26	September 20, 1968	March 20, 1969
2	26	September 19, 1969	April 10, 1970
3	24	September 18, 1970	March 19, 1971

== Broadcast ==
Following its first run on NBC, The Name of the Game was made available for syndication to local broadcast stations.

== Home media ==
On October 28, 2014, Shout! Factory was slated to release season 1 on DVD in Region 1 for the first time. However, the release failed to appear, and the show's status is apparently currently still 'in limbo' regarding any DVD release as of April 2016. Shout Factory sent e-mails to interested parties that the DVD release had been cancelled.
