= Oh My God (Guns N' Roses song) =

Guns N' Roses song

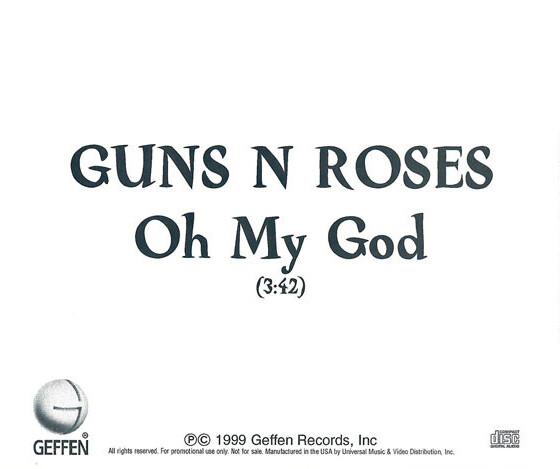

Promotional single by Guns N' Roses

from the album End of Days: Original Movie Soundtrack
- Released: November 2, 1999
- Recorded: 1999
- Genre: Industrial metal; industrial rock; nu metal
- Length: 3:40
- Label: Geffen
- Songwriters: Axl Rose; Paul Tobias; Dizzy Reed; Josh Freese; Tommy Stinson; Sean Riggs
- Producer: Sean Beavan

"Oh My God" is a song by Guns N' Roses released in 1999 on the soundtrack to the film End of Days. The song was sent to radio stations in November 1999 as a promo for the soundtrack and the band. Despite being the band's first recorded release in almost five years, it was never issued as a stand-alone single for public retail. The song was written as the band was recording music for Chinese Democracy.

== Background ==
In a press release, Axl Rose gave details about the song:

"The chorus deals with the societal repression of deep and often agonizing emotions -- some of which may be willingly accepted for one reason or another -- the appropriate expression of which (one that promotes a healing, release and a positive resolve) is often discouraged and many times denied. Emotionally the song contemplates several abstract perspectives drawing from personal expression as well as from the film and its metaphors. The appropriate expression and vehicle for such emotions and concepts is not something taken for granted.

The fight of good vs. evil, positive vs. negative, man against a seemingly undefeatable, undeterrable, unrevealed destiny, along with the personal and universal struggle to attain, maintain and responsibly manage freewill can be and often is frustrating to say the least. In America our country's constitutional right to freedom of expression gives us a better chance to fight for that expression than many in other countries enjoy. It can be a big gig, like kickin' the crap outta the devil!"

The song was primarily written by Paul Tobias around 1997. Dizzy Reed wrote the hook of the chorus. Rose claimed that former members Duff McKagan and Matt Sorum 'failed to see the potential' of the song and had no interest in recording or playing the piece. Sean Riggs, Reed's roommate and occasional fill-in GNR studio drummer, assisted in writing the song.

Paul Tobias, Gary Sunshine and Dave Navarro all play on the song. Robin Finck's part was written by Tobias and 'extensively manipulated' by producer Sean Beavan. Rose claimed that Finck was not involved in the writing of the final recording, although he participated in the arrangement. Finck denies he was involved with the song, despite Rose's claim. Rose wrote the lyrics to the song, and additional programing was performed by engineer Stuart White. The song debuted in a commercial for the film during the 1999 MTV Video Music Awards, and was featured in trailers for the film leading up to its release. According to sources, Rose, Jimmy Iovine and several studio technicians stayed up all night adjusting the final mix before it was due. Producer Sean Beavan stated that Iovine personally picked the song for the soundtrack after hearing several works in progress.

In 2008, Rose claimed the song was an unfinished demo which was rushed to be released for inclusion with the End of Days film soundtrack. Rose stated "there’s a remix with lots of new vocals and a wilder guitar intro, but it’s not taken all that seriously".

A small clip with new guitars added by then-Guns N' Roses guitarist Ron "Bumblefoot" Thal leaked online in late 2013.

== Reception ==
"Oh My God" did not fare well on rock radio. It had a limited chart run of 5 weeks, peaking at #26 on the US Mainstream Rock Charts. Nevertheless, it won a 1999 Metal Edge Readers' Choice Award for Soundtrack Song of the Year.

The Washington Post described the song by saying "It's a bit thicker, and somehow heavier, than yesteryowl, but there's no mistaking Axl Rose, whose riveting roar remains in a class by itself".

In a review of the film, NYFilm had a negative opinion of the song, saying "Oh My God. God Awful is more like it. Believe me, it's not worth waiting for. If you've heard it, you know what I mean. If you haven't, trust me on this one." AllMusic described the song as "essentially sounds like Rose catching up to where Nine Inch Nails and Ministry were in 1994, the very year he faded into seclusion. And "Oh My God" is clearly the work of an artist in seclusion, piecing together something he thinks sounds hip and happening. It's overloaded with processed guitars and distorted vocals, yet it's structured like a typical G N' R song; consequently, it seems weirdly out of time. It's a less than satisfying comeback proving just how out-of-step Rose was with nearly every post-Nirvana progression in hard rock and heavy metal."

In a ranking of all 87 Guns N' Roses songs, WMMR ranked "Oh My God" 83rd, describing it as "Axl trying to channel his best Marilyn Manson but coming up short." Medium described the song as "A decent tune, even if it sounds like it was bolted together from the spare parts of five other songs." Spin, while also noting the Marilyn Manson similarities, described it by saying "It’s just an unusually tuneless GN’R cut".

Former Guns N' Roses member Slash stated that upon hearing the song he "(didn't) have any real opinion about it" and that it "convinced me that my departure had been a wise decision and that Axl and I were definitely no longer on the same wavelength musically."

== Live ==
"Oh My God" was played live four times in early and late 2001 on the first leg of the Chinese Democracy Tour. It has remained absent since then, but the band has played it during sound checks as recently as 2011. In an interview with Guitarworks in April 2003, rhythm guitarist Richard Fortus mentioned he was planning on using his Anderson Baritom guitar on a future tour while performing the song. Although not played since 2001, the song showed up as an alternate on the setlist for a 2018 show in the Not In This Lifetime... Tour.

== Personnel ==
Guns N' Roses

- Axl Rose – lead vocals
- Paul Tobias – rhythm guitar
- Tommy Stinson – bass
- Dizzy Reed – keyboards, synthesizers
- Chris Pitman – keyboards, synthesizers
- Josh Freese – drums, percussion
- Robin Finck – lead guitar

Additional musicians

- Dave Navarro – additional guitar
- Gary Sunshine – additional guitar
- Stuart White – additional programming

Production

- Sean Beavan – production
- Andy Wallace – mixing

== Charts ==
Chart (1999)	Peak position
US Mainstream Rock (Billboard)	26
