= Generation of Vipers =

1943 book by Philip Wylie

- First edition
- Author: Phillip Wylie
- Language: English
- Genre: Non-fiction
- Publisher: Farrar & Rinehart
- Publication date: January 1943
- Publication place: United States

Generation of Vipers is a 1943 book by Philip Wylie. In it Wylie criticizes various aspects and beliefs of contemporary American society, including Christianity; prominent figures such as politicians, teachers, and doctors; and "momism" or the adoration of mothers.

== History ==
Wylie wrote the book in Miami Beach, Florida beginning on May 12, 1942 and ending on July 4, 1942; he felt disillusioned after having a job with the U.S. government providing information about World War II. The book was published in January 1943.

By 1955, the book had twenty printings and a new edition came out.

== Reception ==
Mike Wallace stated in his 1957 interview of Wylie that many viewers had criticized Wylie's conclusions about mothers, and Wylie responded by stating that he was only talking about a certain type of mother.

In 2005, Jonathan Yardley of the Washington Post argued that the book had not aged well in his second reading; he had first read the book in the 1960s.
