= That Royle Girl =

1925 film by D. W. Griffith

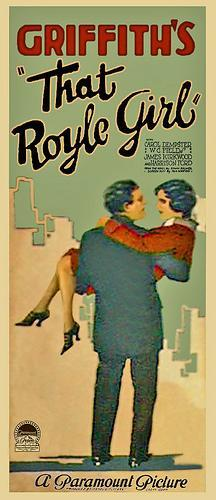
- Film poster
- Directed by: D. W. Griffith
- Written by: Paul Schofield
- Based on: That Royle Girl by Edwin Balmer
- Produced by: Jesse L. Lasky
- Starring: Carol Dempster; W. C. Fields; James Kirkwood; Harrison Ford
- Cinematography: Harry Fischbeck; Harold S. Sintzenich
- Edited by: James Smith
- Production company: Famous Players–Lasky
- Distributed by: Paramount Pictures
- Release date: December 7, 1925
- Running time: 114 minutes
- Country: United States
- Language: Silent (English intertitles)
- Budget: $595,000
- Box office: $900,000

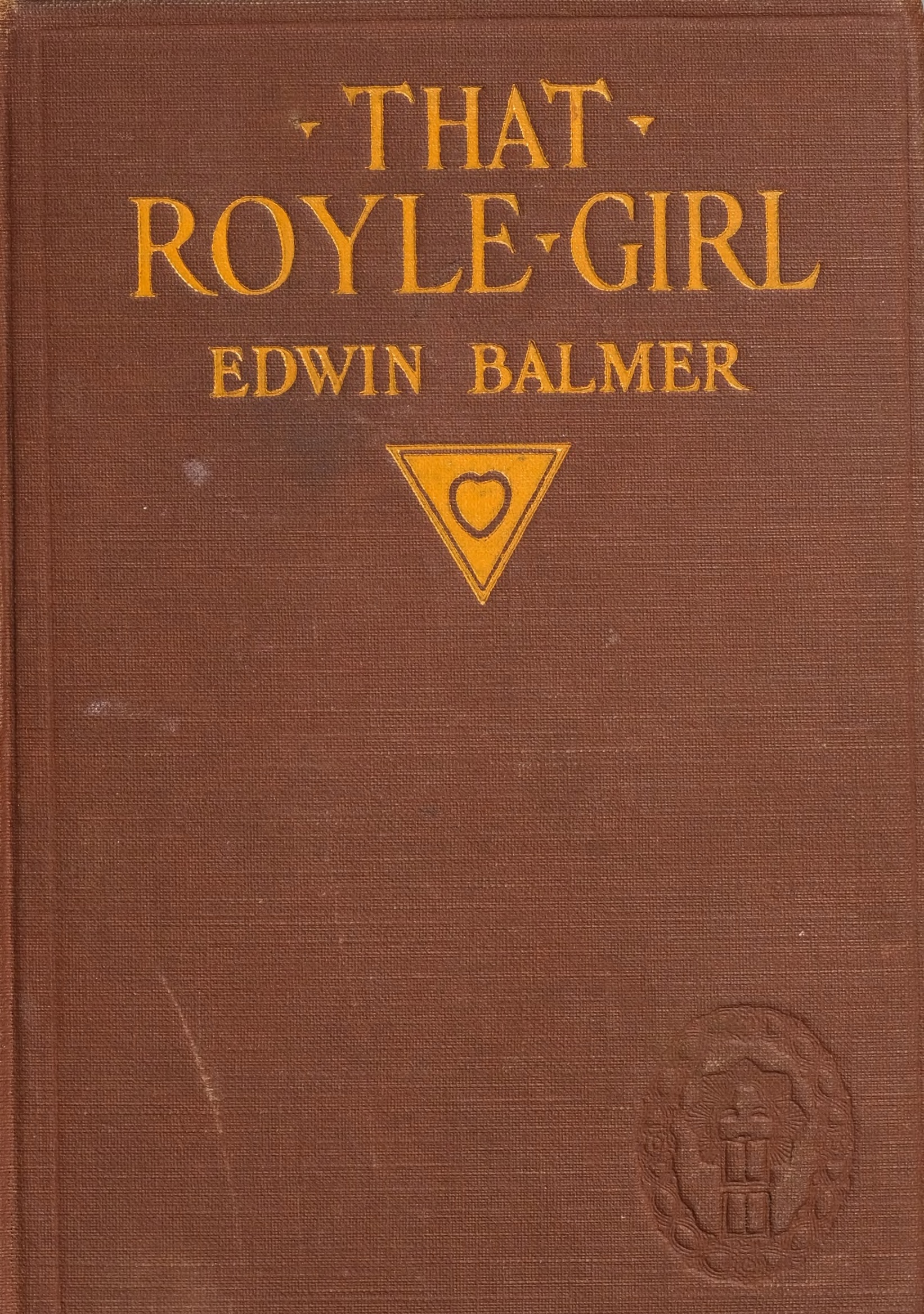
The cover of the novel that the film was based on

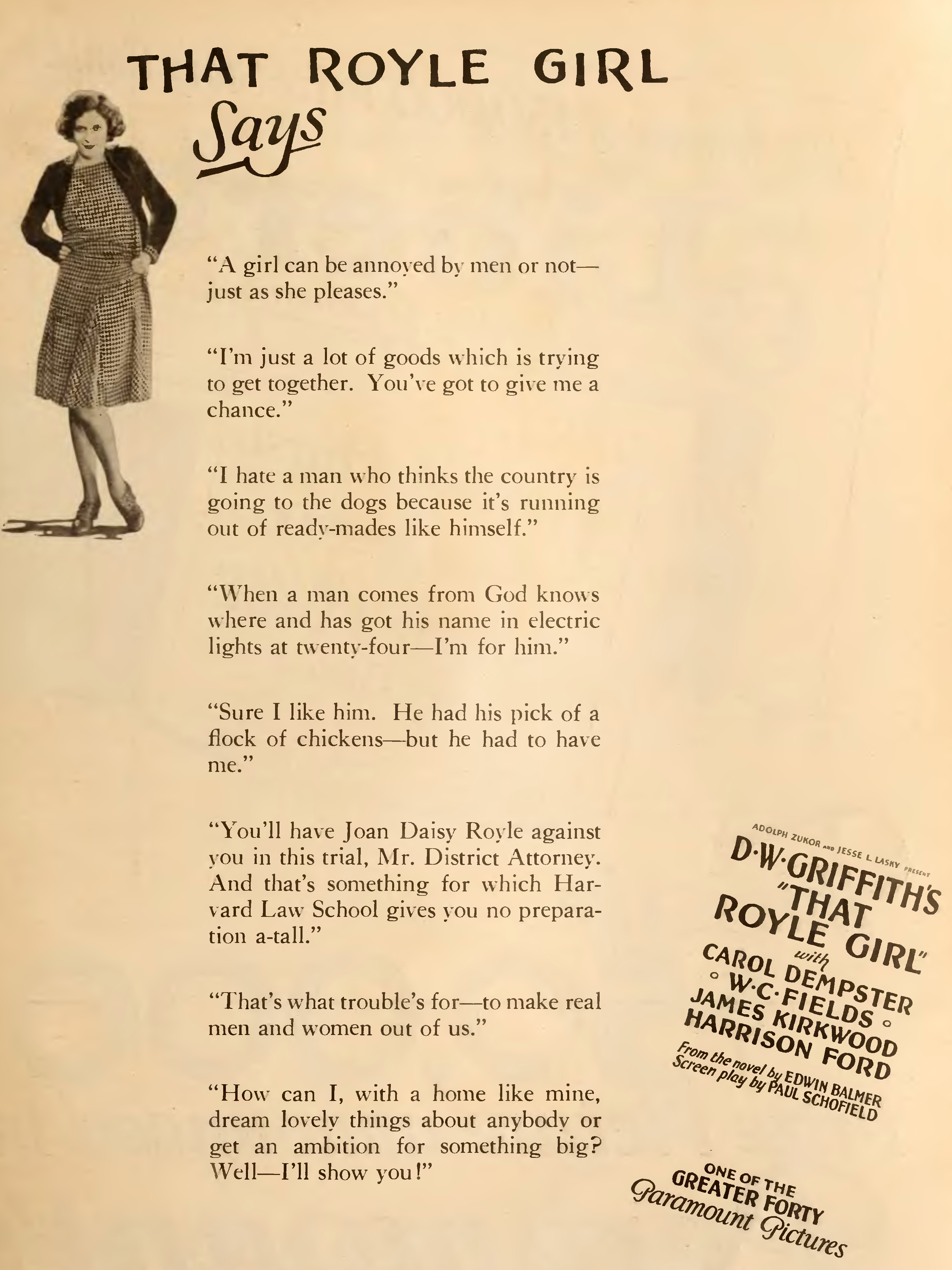
That Royle Girl, 1925 ad

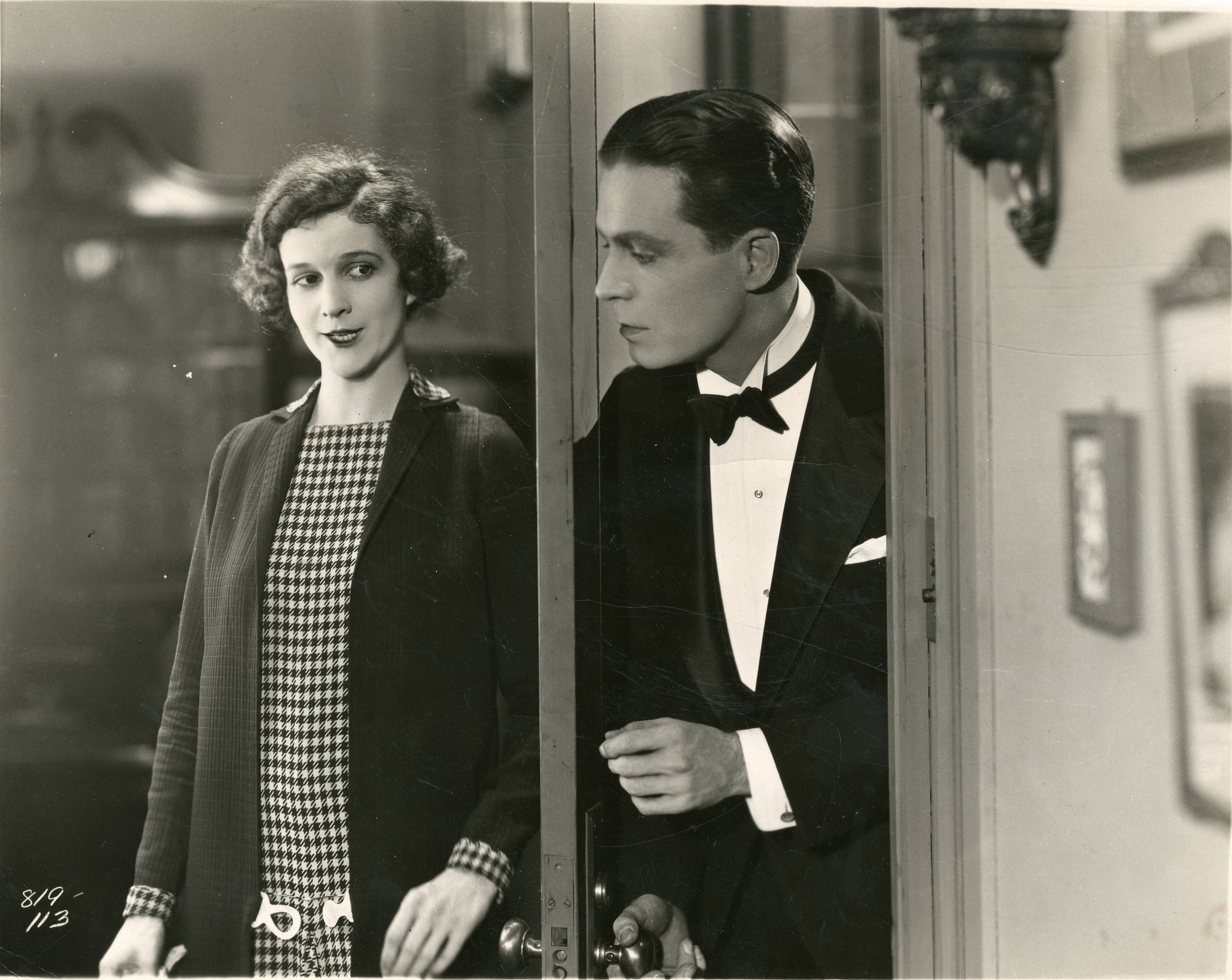
That Royle Girl publicity photo

That Royle Girl is a 1925 American silent comedy film directed by D. W. Griffith and released by Paramount Pictures. The film was based on the novel of the same name by Edwin Balmer, and starred Carol Dempster, W. C. Fields and Harrison Ford. It is now considered lost.

== Plot ==
As described in a film magazine review and other references, a poor mannequin from the slums of Chicago fancies she is in love with a jazz music composer and orchestra leader who is married but does not live with his wife. One night his wife is murdered and the modiste's assistant is held as a material witness because she is known to have been friendly with the musician. After he is improperly convicted and sentenced to death for murder, she succeeds in clearing him just as he is to be hanged. Only then does she learn that she loves the district attorney who secured the conviction. Her love of him is reciprocated.

== Cast ==
- Carol Dempster as Joan Daisy Royle
- W. C. Fields as her father
- James Kirkwood as Calvin Clarke
- Harrison Ford as Fred Ketlar
- Paul Everton as George Baretta
- Kathleen Chambers as Adele Ketlar
- George Regas as his henchman
- Florence Auer as Baretta's girl
- Ida Waterman as Mrs. Clarke
- Alice Laidley as Clarke's fiancée
- Dorothy Love as Lola Nelson
- Dore Davidson as Elman
- Frank Allworth as Oliver
- Bobby Watson as Hofer

== Production ==
This film, along with Sally of the Sawdust, marked Griffith's return to working for an important Hollywood studio like Paramount Pictures, something he had not experienced since leaving Biograph in 1914, though his independently produced features were released through Triangle, Paramount, and United Artists. He also had to work with a tight shooting script as Paramount executives Adolph Zukor and Jesse L. Lasky insisted the film be brought on schedule and on budget.

Griffith had been a founding partner in Triangle Studios in 1915 and United Artists in 1919, and these ventures allowed him leeway in the way he made films. However, now the leisurely approach to filmmaking Griffith had enjoyed at his own Mamaroneck, Long Island, New York studio was gone. Griffith had been for all intents and purposes an independent producer since leaving Biograph. Griffith shot That Royle Girl on locations across Chicago. The film's climactic sequence, a devastating tornado, was filmed on a football field at Paramount's Astoria Studio in Queens, New York, where Griffith created a fully built village. Griffith used the power of 24 airplane propellers to recreate the wreckage and ruin of the tornado's fury.

While the production was underway, Griffith added W. C. Fields to the cast for a comedy relief supporting role as the heroine's inebriated stepfather.

== Preservation ==
No print of That Royle Girl is known to exist. In 1980, the American Film Institute included this title among its list of the "Ten Most Wanted" lost films of all time.

== See also ==
- List of lost films
