= Two Worlds Collide =

Two Worlds Collide may refer to:

- Two Worlds Collide (album), an album by Australian group The McClymonts
- SNL Digital Shorts, a skit with Samberg and Thompson
- "Two Worlds Collide", a song by Inspiral Carpets from the album Revenge of the Goldfish
- "Two Worlds Collide", a song by Demi Lovato from the album Don't Forget

== See also ==
- When Two Worlds Collide, an album by Jerry Lee Lewis
