= Tonight the Stars Revolt! =

Studio album by Powerman 5000
- Released: July 20, 1999
- Studio: Sunset Sound (Hollywood); Sound City (Van Nuys); The Chop Shop (Los Angeles); Music Grinder (Hollywood)
- Genre: Industrial metal; nu metal
- Length: 39:09
- Label: DreamWorks
- Producer: Sylvia Massy; Ulrich Wild; Powerman 5000

Powerman 5000 chronology
The Blood-Splat Rating System (1995)	Tonight the Stars Revolt! (1999)	Anyone for Doomsday? (2001)

Singles from Tonight the Stars Revolt!
- 1. "When Worlds Collide" Released: July 1999; 2. "Nobody's Real" Released: November 2, 1999; 3. "Supernova Goes Pop" Released: 2000

Tonight the Stars Revolt! is the second studio album and major label debut by American rock band Powerman 5000. It was released on July 20, 1999, by DreamWorks Records. Having sold over one million copies and achieving platinum status, this would become the group's most successful release and featured such hits as "Nobody's Real" and "When Worlds Collide".

== Composition ==
Building on the style of their previous album, Powerman 5000 expands the band's style to combine "roaring heavy metal with electronics and sound effects" and lyrics chanted in a monotone voice. The album stylistically departs from the funk metal sound of their debut in favor of industrial and nu metal songs inspired by B-movie and comic book science fiction. The album's lyrics are themed around "gods and monsters, global annihilation and man-machines hungering for destruction."

The album shares the same title as a story written by Gardner Fox published in the pulp science fiction magazine Planet Stories (1952).

== Reception ==
Professional ratings
Review scores
Source	Rating
AllMusic	4/5 stars
Robert Christgau	(dud)
Rolling Stone	2/5 stars
Yahoo! Music	(favorable)

- CMJ (July 19, 1999, p. 3) – "...tighter than a barbed wire noose wrapped around your neck...[TONIGHT] relies on sci-fi imagery and memorable hooks that are sharp enough to catch more than a few big, heavy fish".

== Awards ==
The album won the Boston Music Awards for "Album of the Year" in 2000, while "When Worlds Collide" was nominated for "Single of the Year".

== Track listing ==
All lyrics by Spider One; all music by Powerman 5000, except "Good Times Roll" by the Cars.

No.	Title	Length
1.	"An Eye Is Upon You" (featuring Malachi Throne)	0:51
2.	"Supernova Goes Pop"	3:14
3.	"When Worlds Collide"	2:58
4.	"Nobody's Real"	2:54
5.	"System 11:11"	0:48
6.	"Tonight the Stars Revolt!"	2:42
7.	"Automatic"	3:22
8.	"The Son of X-51"	2:58
9.	"Operate, Annihilate"	3:48
10.	"Blast Off to Nowhere" (featuring Rob Zombie)	3:45
11.	"They Know Who You Are"	2:33
12.	"Good Times Roll" (featuring DJ Lethal)	2:33
13.	"Watch the Sky for Me" (featuring Ginger Fish and Malachi Throne)	5:22
Total length:		39:09

Notes

- The song "Watch the Sky for Me" ends at minute 3:50. After 30 seconds of silence (3:50–4:20), the hidden track "The World of the Dead" starts.

== Personnel ==
- Spider One – vocals
- Adam 12 – guitar
- M.33 – guitar
- Dorian 27 – bass
- Al 3 – drums

Production

- Chapman Baehler – photography
- Tom Baker – mastering
- Joe Barresi – engineer
- Ginger Fish – piano
- Frank Gryner – mixing
- Scott Humphrey – programming, mixing
- Sylvia Massy – producer, engineer
- Marc LaCorte – programming
- DJ Lethal – turntables
- Spider One – art direction, design
- Nika – art direction, design
- Malachi Throne – narrator
- Ulrich Wild – producer, mixing
- Rob Zombie – vocals (track 10)

== Charts ==
=== Weekly charts ===
Weekly chart performance for Tonight the Stars Revolt!
Chart (1999)	Peak position
US Billboard 200	29

=== Year-end charts ===
Year-end chart performance for Tonight the Stars Revolt!
Chart (2000)	Position
US Billboard 200	187

== Certifications ==
Certifications for Tonight the Stars Revolt!
Region	Certification	Certified units/sales
United States (RIAA)	Platinum	1,000,000^{^}
^{^} Shipments figures based on certification alone.
