= When Worlds Collide (Powerman 5000 song) =

Single by Powerman 5000

from the album Tonight the Stars Revolt!
- Released: July 1999
- Genre: Nu metal; industrial metal
- Length: 2:58
- Label: DreamWorks
- Songwriter: Powerman 5000
- Producers: Sylvia Massy; Powerman 5000

Powerman 5000 singles chronology
"Organizized" (1998)	"When Worlds Collide" (1999)	"Nobody's Real" (1999)

Music video
- "When Worlds Collide" on YouTube

"When Worlds Collide" is a song by American rock band Powerman 5000 from their album Tonight the Stars Revolt!. It is one of the band's-best known songs and has been used in the video games Tony Hawk's Pro Skater 2, WWE SmackDown! vs. Raw, WWE 2K26, Tony Hawk's Pro Skater HD and Tony Hawk's Pro Skater 1 + 2 in addition to the 2000 film Little Nicky. The song was nominated by the Boston Music Awards in 2000 for "Single of the Year". Spider One has stated that the song is about social classes. In 2016, the band accused Square Enix of stealing the song for use in their popular MMO Final Fantasy XIV.

In 2017, Annie Zaleski of Spin named it the ninth-best nu metal track of all time.

In 2020, Powerman 5000 re-recorded the song. It was initially exclusively available on the CD version of their album The Noble Rot. On October 15, 2020, it was released as a digital single and on streaming platforms.

== Music and lyrics ==
Annie Zaleski of Spin described the song as "a gleeful stomp about overthrowing systematic oppression with gravelly vocals and Jetsons-worthy futuristic synthesizers".

The song talks about social classes according to frontman Spider One. The song begins and concludes with heavier segments with screamed vocals, while its middle section is more atmospheric and melodic. The song's title shares the name of the 1951 science-fiction film, When Worlds Collide, and the 1933 novel upon which the film was based.

The sample "You Are a Robot" comes from the 1962 film The Creation of the Humanoids.

== Track listing ==
CD single

No.	Title	Length
1.	"When Worlds Collide"	2:57
2.	"They Know Who You Are"

Cassette single

No.	Title	Length
1.	"When Worlds Collide"
2.	"The Son of X-51"

== Charts ==
Chart (1999)	Peak position
U.S. Billboard Mainstream Rock Tracks	16
U.S. Billboard Modern Rock Tracks	18

== Certifications ==
Certifications for "When Worlds Collide"
Region	Certification	Certified units/sales
New Zealand (RMNZ)	Gold	15,000^{‡}
^{‡} Sales+streaming figures based on certification alone.
