= Edwin Balmer =

American novelist (1883–1959)

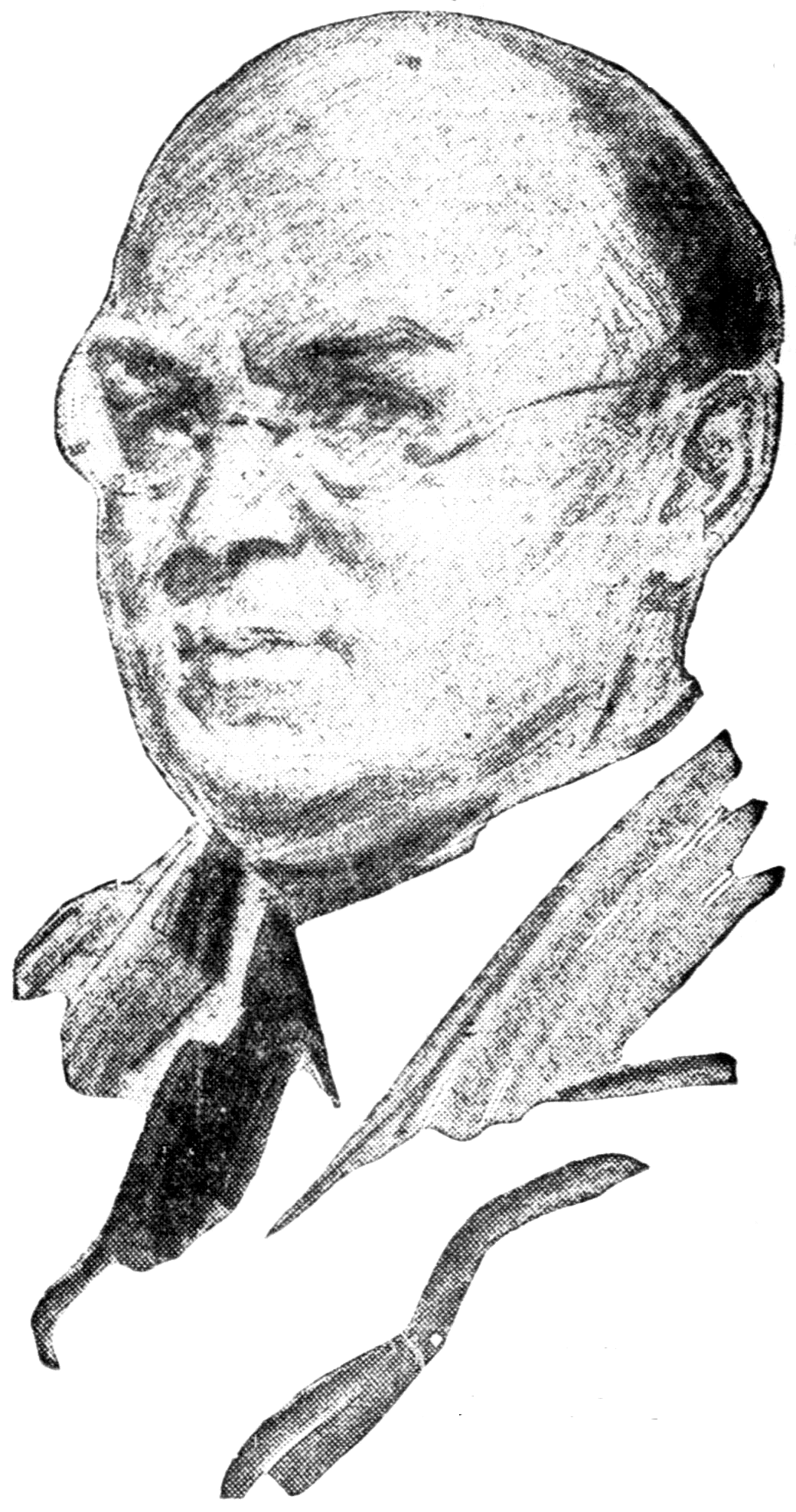
- A portrait of Edwin Balmer by James Montgomery Flagg, published in The Indianapolis Times, 1923
- Born: July 26, 1883; Chicago, Illinois, U.S.
- Died: March 21, 1959 (aged 75); North Tarrytown, New York, U.S.
- Resting place: Rosehill Cemetery
- Occupation: Writer
- Writing career
- Genres: Science fiction, mystery

Edwin Balmer (July 26, 1883 – March 21, 1959) was an American science fiction and mystery writer.

== Biography ==
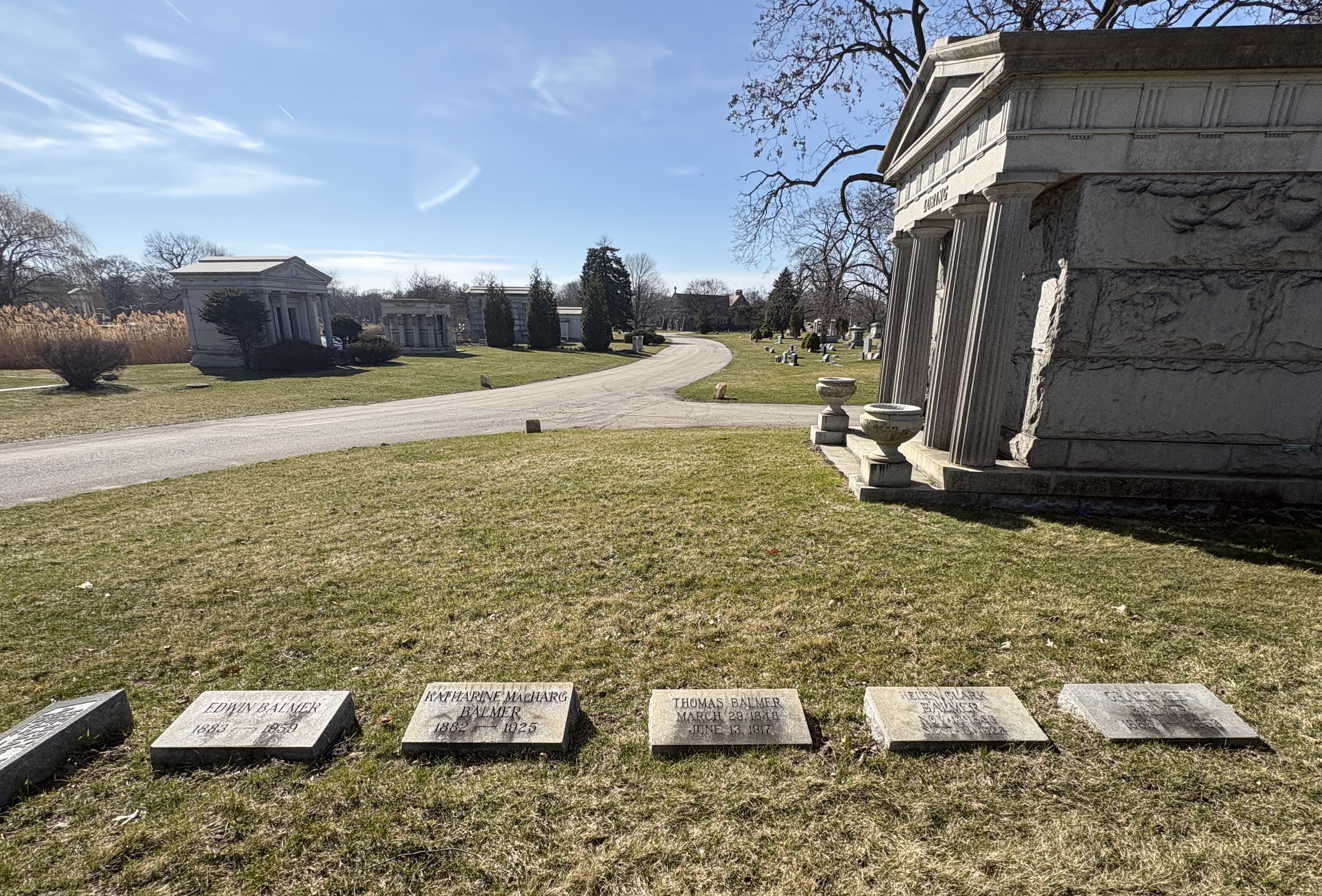
Balmer's grave at Rosehill Cemetery

Balmer was born in Chicago to Helen Clark (Pratt) and Thomas Balmer. In 1909, he married Katharine MacHarg, sister of the writer William MacHarg. After her death, he married Grace A. Kee in 1927.

He began as a reporter for the Chicago Tribune in 1903 before writing for books and magazines. He was editor of Redbook (1927–1949) and later became associate publisher. He would then commission young writers to write up these ideas for inclusion in Redbook.

He died at Phelps Hospital in North Tarrytown, New York on March 21, 1959, at age 75, and was buried at Rosehill Cemetery in Chicago.

== Novels ==
Together with author Philip Wylie, he wrote the catastrophe science fiction novels When Worlds Collide (1933) and After Worlds Collide (1934). The former was made into an award-winning 1951 movie by George Pal.

Balmer also wrote several detective novels and collaborated with William MacHarg on The Achievements of Luther Trant (1910), an early collection of detective short stories.

== Comic strip ==
Balmer also helped create (with artist Marvin Bradley) the syndicated comic strip Speed Spaulding, partially based on the Worlds Collide series, which ran from 1938 through 1941 in the comic book Famous Funnies.

== Bibliography ==
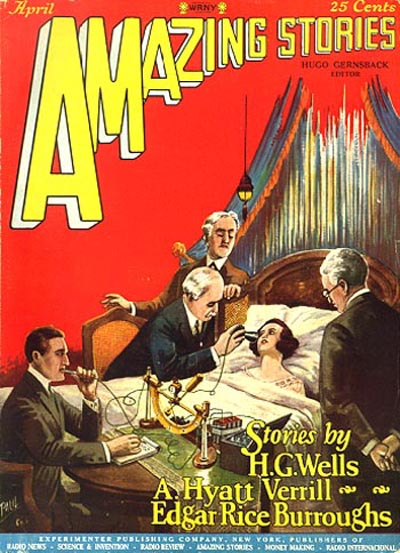
The April 1927 Amazing Stories cover-featured a reprint of "The Man in the Room", a Luther Trant detective story Balmer wrote together with William MacHarg

- 1909 – Waylaid by Wireless
- 1910 – The Achievements of Luther Trant with William MacHarg
- 1910 – The Science of Advertising with counsel from Thomas Balmer
- 1913 – The Surakarta with William MacHarg
- 1915 – A Wild-Goose Chase
- 1916 – The Blind Man's Eyes with William MacHarg
- 1917 – The Indian Drum with William MacHarg
- 1919 – Ruth of the U. S. A.
- 1920 – Resurrection Rock
- 1922 – The Breath of Scandal
- 1923 – Keeban
- 1924 – Fidelia
- 1925 – That Royle Girl, basis for a silent comedy film of the same name
- 1927 – Dangerous Business, filmed as Party Girl in 1930
- 1927 – Flying Death
- 1932 – Five Fatal Words with Philip Wylie
- 1933 – The Golden Hoard with Philip Wylie
- 1933 – When Worlds Collide with Philip Wylie
- 1934 – After Worlds Collide with Philip Wylie
- 1934 – Dragons Drive You
- 1936 – The Shield of Silence with Philip Wylie
- 1941 – The Torn Letter
- 1954 – In His Hands
- 1956 – The Candle of the Wicked
- 1958 – With All the World Away
- 2013 – The Complete Achievements of Luther Trant (the 1910 book with 3 additional stories)
