= L.A. 2017 =

- The Name of the Game episode
- Episode no.: Season 3 Episode 16
- Directed by: Steven Spielberg
- Story by: Philip Wylie
- Original air date: January 22, 1971
- Running time: 76 minutes

Guest appearances
- Gene Barry; Barry Sullivan; Edmond O'Brien; Paul Stewart

Episode chronology
← Previous "A Sister from Napoli"	Next → "The Man Who Killed a Ghost"

"L.A. 2017" is a 1971 episode of the NBC television series The Name of the Game. Sometimes referred to as "Los Angeles: AD 2017" (the name of Philip Wylie's subsequent novel based on his script) or "Los Angeles 2017", it is a science fiction piece, shot for $375,000. The episode was directed by Steven Spielberg.

This is the sixteenth episode of the third season, and the cast includes Barry Sullivan, Severn Darden, and Edmond O'Brien. The episode is 76 minutes long (90 minutes including commercials). The episode has never been released on home video, either as a stand-alone film, or as a part of the series. Presenting the story as a dream was the only way that Wylie's science fiction tale could be fitted into the peculiar format of The Name of the Game, a show about the magazine business set in the present and rotating between Gene Barry, Tony Franciosa, and Robert Stack (and in the third season also featuring Peter Falk, Robert Wagner, and Robert Culp).

== Plot ==
A publisher, Glenn Howard (Gene Barry), while driving and dictating a memo to the President regarding the saving of the environment, finds himself suddenly plunged 46 years into the future only to learn that the people of Los Angeles are living underground to escape the pollution which has made living on the surface no longer possible. A fascist America is run like a corporation with a number of vice-presidents. The police department of the subterranean Los Angeles is led / managed by psychiatrists. His identity is discovered and he's asked to join the government by re-starting his publication as propaganda. He considers, then refuses when he discovers that the corporations are still emitting pollutants into the air, further destroying the atmosphere.

At the end, Howard wakes up to discover a police officer leaning over him holding a breathing mask he had just administered oxygen through; he asks Howard if he is okay, and able to drive. Howard responds that he is recovered. Evidently the previous episode was all a dream: Howard passed out in his car after inhaling carbon monoxide leaking out through his car's dash vents; luckily with no other consequences. At the end of the final scene, he starts his Chrysler 300 and the camera focuses on the smoky exhaust spewing out its tailpipe. As he drives away the camera pans to a final image of a dead bird, that forebodes a troubled future.

== Cast ==
- Gene Barry as Glenn Howard
- Barry Sullivan as Dane Bigelow
- Edmond O'Brien as Bergman
- Severn Darden as Cameron
- Paul Stewart as Dr. Rubias
- Alicia Bond as Dr. Barton
- Regis Cordic as Chairman
- Walt Davis as technician
- Sharon Farrell as Sandrelle
- Michael C. Gwynne as Dr. Parker
- Steven Karpf as Karpf
- Louise Latham as Helen Bigelow
- Geoffrey Lewis as Bates
- Sarah Lord as technician
- Gloria Manon as Dr. Arnold
- Phil Montgomery as Keeger
- Stuart Nisbet as Dr. Simmons
- Jason Wingreen as Hammond
