= Momism =

Momism may refer to:

- A critical label introduced by essayist Philip Wylie in his 1942 collection Generation of Vipers, referring to an American cult of motherhood
- The practice of helicopter parenting and similar intensive and intrusive parenting styles by mothers
- "Momisms", a song by the American comedian Anita Renfroe
