= Rogue star =

Rogue star may refer to:

- Intergalactic star, a star not gravitationally bound to any galaxy
- Rogue Star (novel), the third book of the Starchild Trilogy by Frederik Pohl and Jack Williamson
- Rogue Star, a novel by Michael Flynn
- Rogue Star, a Warhammer 40,000 novel by Andy Hoare
- "Rogue Star", a short story by Murray Leinster
- Rogue Star Films, a South African film production company

== See also ==
- Rogue Sun, a 2022 comic book series set in the Massive-Verse published by Image Comics
- Rogue Sun, a video game developer who release Tin Hearts in 2023 in video games
