= After Worlds Collide =

1934 novel by Philip Wylie

- Cover of After Worlds Collide
- Author: Edwin Balmer & Philip Wylie
- Language: English
- Genre: Science fiction novel
- Publisher: Frederick A. Stokes Company
- Publication date: 1934
- Publication place: United States
- Media type: Print (hardcover & paperback)
- Pages: 341 pp
- Preceded by: When Worlds Collide

After Worlds Collide (1934) is a sequel to the 1933 science fiction novel, When Worlds Collide. Both novels were co-written by Edwin Balmer and Philip Wylie. After Worlds Collide first appeared as a six-part monthly serial (November 1933 through April 1934) in Blue Book magazine. Much shorter and less florid than the original novel, this one tells the story of the survivors' progress on their new world, Bronson Beta, after the destruction of the Earth.

== Synopsis ==
Bronson Alpha, the larger of two rogue planets, collided with and destroyed the Earth, before leaving the Solar System. However, its companion, the roughly Earth-sized Bronson Beta remained behind and settled into a stable, but eccentric, orbit around the Sun. The United States and several other countries feverishly constructed space arks to transport a select few to Bronson Beta. The Americans, under the leadership of scientist Cole Hendron, managed to launch two space arks, carrying hundreds of people, as well as the animals, plants and knowledge they will need to hopefully survive on the alien planet. Both American ships reach this new world, as do at least two others, though each is unaware of the fates of the others.

The survivors of Hendron's original, smaller ark set out to establish a colony, aware (from a road they find) that an alien civilization once existed on Bronson Beta. Tony Drake and another man scout for suitable farmland, but during their return journey following the alien road, the two come across a vehicle. After a mysterious disease strikes the camp, killing three colonists, Hendron forbids exploration. Some of the colonists defy him and strike out, bringing back wood from a distant forest. That night, an aircraft passes near the camp, beating a hasty retreat when the campfire is spotted.

Kyto, Tony's Japanese former manservant, finds a piece of blank paper blowing in the wind: It is watermarked in English, which provides a first clue that another group of survivors have landed on Bronson Beta. It is revealed later that a group composed of Germans, Russians, and Japanese intend to establish a "soviet" called "The Dominion of Asian Realists".

The American camp builds an exploratory aircraft from remnants of the ark and its rockets, and Tony Drake sets off with writer Eliot James. They follow the road and discover a domed city. Finding a native poster portraying a Bronson Beta female, Drake and James learn that the Bronson Beta natives were essentially humanoid. Construction of the city shows that the original inhabitants had considerably higher technology than humanity. They later find the natives built five domed cities to survive their world's departure into interstellar space, but ultimately decided to simply become extinct after they were completed. Once a linguist deciphers the natives' language, it is learned that the five domed cities were named Gorfulu, Khorlu, Strahl, Danot, and Wend, the last being the name of the city they discovered.

The Americans explore Wend. Then they fly south and discover a searchlight in the dark. It comes from the second American ark, which had a disastrous landing. There is a joyous reunion with its commander, Dave Ransdell. Ransdell's camp also had an encounter with a mysterious aircraft.

Tony and Ransdell fly back to Hendron's camp, finding that Hendron is visibly deteriorating in health and mind. Tony is jealous that Ransdell apparently will become their new leader and will also have Eve, Hendron's daughter, as his wife. Eve, acting as Hendron's regent, sends Tony to deliver a radio to Ransdell's camp. The first message reports that Hendron's camp has come under some sort of attack. Tony and one of Ransdell's men investigate; they find everyone unconscious on the ground.

They discover everyone is alive, but drugged; they give the doctor antidotes and then hear an aircraft approaching, occupied by men with Slavic features. After the aircraft leaves, Tony prepares weapons (rocket tubes from the Ark) to defend the camp. An armada soon arrives, but is obliterated by the improvised weapons.

The people gradually wake up. Hendron hands command over to Tony, to Ransdell's relief. Tony decides to occupy one of the alien cities, not the one they found, but another one nearby — Khorlu — later renamed Hendron-Khorlu; they follow the road there.

During the trip, they encounter an alien automobile driven by a British woman; she explains that a British ship also made it from Earth, but landed in a lake; they were found the next day by the "Dominion of Asian Realists" group, which Hendron nicknames "Midianites", who enslaved the British. The Midianites' society is structured like an ant farm, the colony being all important and the people nothing, but the top rulers live luxuriously.

Tony's group settle into the alien city, and tractors are sent to bring Ransdell's contingent. Hendron dies just as the convoy comes into view of the city. The scientists manage, with the Britons' help, to figure out how to charge the batteries and operate the machinery. They also find hangars housing alien aircraft. They arm some of them to use for air defense.

Meanwhile, the planet is approaching aphelion, and nobody is entirely certain that it is in a stable orbit around the Sun. The weather gets colder, and one night, the Midianites, who have settled in the largest domed city (Gorfulu, which also controls power to the other four cities), disconnect Hendron-Khorlu's power supply. A woman defects to the Midianites, while four others attempt to reach Gorfulu using a high-speed car in an underground service tunnel. They are unsuccessful, but the female "defector" kills the Midianite leader, defeats his key people, and allows the British to take control.

The Dominion is defeated, and the victorious American-British coalition settles into the domed cities, along with the formerly subjugated Midianites. While challenges remain, their immediate needs for shelter, energy, and food are taken care of. While exploring through the domed city's extensive sub-basements, they catch fleeting glimpses that imply other inhabitants might be hiding deep in its underground places. The story ends on an optimistic note with a reference to the first pregnancy among the colonists, Eve and Tony's, and the confirmation that they have passed aphelion and are definitely locked into a closed orbit around the Sun.

== Unproduced film ==
In the mid-1950s, George Pal considered producing a sequel to his 1951 film When Worlds Collide, which would likely have been based on this novel. However, the box office failure of Conquest of Space set back his career for the remainder of the decade and destroyed any chance of a sequel.
