= End of Days (film) =

1999 film by Peter Hyams

- Theatrical release poster
- Directed by: Peter Hyams
- Written by: Andrew W. Marlowe
- Produced by: Armyan Bernstein; Bill Borden
- Starring: Arnold Schwarzenegger; Gabriel Byrne; Kevin Pollak; Robin Tunney; Rod Steiger
- Cinematography: Peter Hyams
- Edited by: Steven Kemper
- Music by: John Debney
- Production company: Beacon Pictures
- Distributed by: Universal Pictures
- Release date: November 24, 1999
- Running time: 122 minutes
- Country: United States
- Language: English
- Budget: $83–100 million
- Box office: $212 million

End of Days is a 1999 American action horror film shot and directed by Peter Hyams and written by Andrew W. Marlowe. It stars Arnold Schwarzenegger, with Gabriel Byrne, Robin Tunney, Kevin Pollak, Rod Steiger, CCH Pounder, Derrick O'Connor, Miriam Margolyes, and Udo Kier in supporting roles. The film follows former New York Police Department detective Jericho Cane (Schwarzenegger) who, after he saves a banker (Byrne) from an assassin, finds himself embroiled in a religious conflict and must protect an innocent young woman (Tunney) who is chosen by evil forces to conceive the Antichrist with Satan.

The film was released by Universal Pictures in North America on November 24, 1999, and received largely negative reviews, but was a box office success grossing $212 million worldwide.

== Plot ==
Former NYPD Police Detective Jericho Cane runs an elite security agency in New York City. Haunted by the murder of his wife and daughter, both killed in retaliation for his testimony against corrupt police officers, he considers suicide.

On December 28, 1999, Satan arrives on Earth and possesses an investment banker. The following day, Jericho and his close friend Bobby Chicago are assigned as private security for the banker. Jericho saves him from an assassination attempt by prophetic Vatican priest Thomas Aquinas, who warns of Satan's return before being subdued. Driven to understand why he targeted the banker, Jericho and Bobby investigate Aquinas's apartment, where they discover a photo of a young woman named Christine York. Orphaned at a young age, Christine has been raised by disciples of Satan, including her caretaker Mabel, unaware that they are grooming her for their master. She experiences haunting visions of Satan having sex with her, though she believes them to be delusions.

Two days later, Satanist violence has escalated across the city. Satan visits the hospitalized Aquinas and fatally crucifies him before Jericho arrives to interrogate him. Carvings on Aquinas's body lead Jericho to Christine. He and Bobby arrive at her home in time to save her from the Cardinal's knights, who intend to kill her before Satan can take her. Satan arrives and brutally kills Mabel for failing to secure Christine, and immolates Bobby, seemingly killing him.

Jericho and Christine take shelter in the church of Father Kovak, an acquaintance of Aquinas. Kovak explains that every thousand years, Satan rises to Earth to impregnate a chosen woman, an event that will grant Satan dominion over Earth. Satan must conceive the child before midnight on December 31. Jericho rejects the claims, unable to believe in a god who would allow his family to be murdered, but Christine chooses to stay with Kovak and his clergy.

Satan confronts Jericho in his apartment, offering to resurrect his family if he surrenders Christine. Jericho resists and throws Satan out the window to the street below. Bobby then arrives unharmed and agrees to help protect Christine. Jericho returns to the church and prevents more Vatican knights from sacrificing her. Satan intervenes and massacres the knights, while Jericho and Christine flee. However, Bobby betrays them, abducts Christine, and leaves Jericho to be beaten by a Satanist mob. Satan then crucifies Jericho, letting him live so he can witness his ultimate triumph.

Jericho awakens on December 31, having been rescued by Kovak and his clergy. He tracks the Satanists to a subterranean lair where they are gathered in worship as Satan prepares to impregnate Christine. Jericho intervenes and rescues her, but is confronted by Bobby, who reveals that Satan spared his life in exchange for servitude. However, Bobby refuses to kill his friend, prompting Satan to immolate him once more. Before Jericho and Christine escape, he destroys Satan's physical body with a grenade. The pair barricade themselves inside a church, holding off hordes of Satanists. In front of the Christian iconography, Jericho discards his weapon and prays for God's help.

Satan breaks into the church in a monstrous winged form and possesses Jericho. With only moments before midnight, Satan attempts to rape Christine. Responding to her pleas, Jericho regains control long enough to sacrifice himself by impaling his body on a sword held by a statue of the Archangel Michael. Satan is expelled and cast back into Hell. Before he dies, Jericho sees a vision of his wife and daughter waiting for him. Christine thanks Jericho for saving her life as the world celebrates the dawn of a new millennium.

== Cast ==
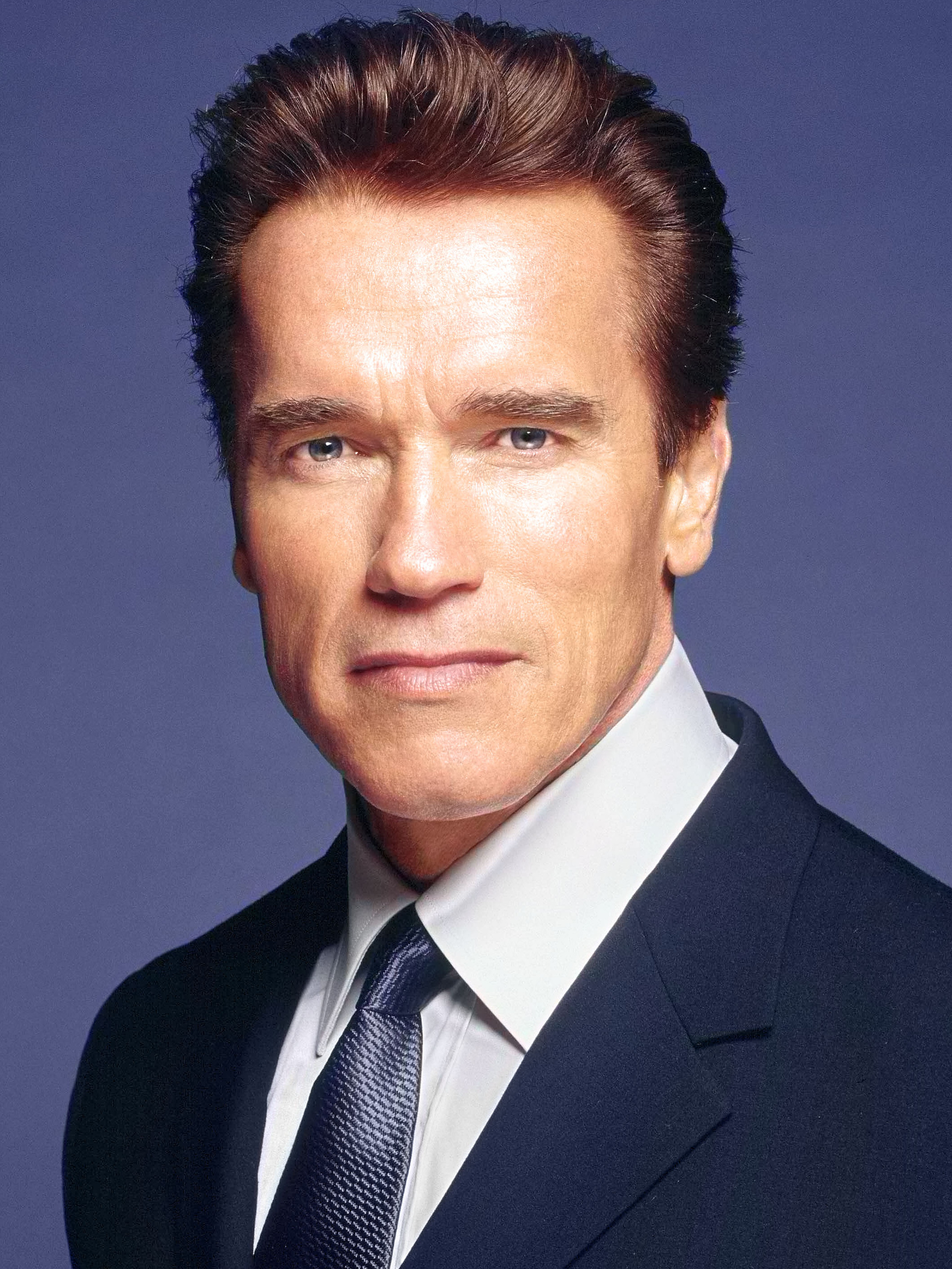
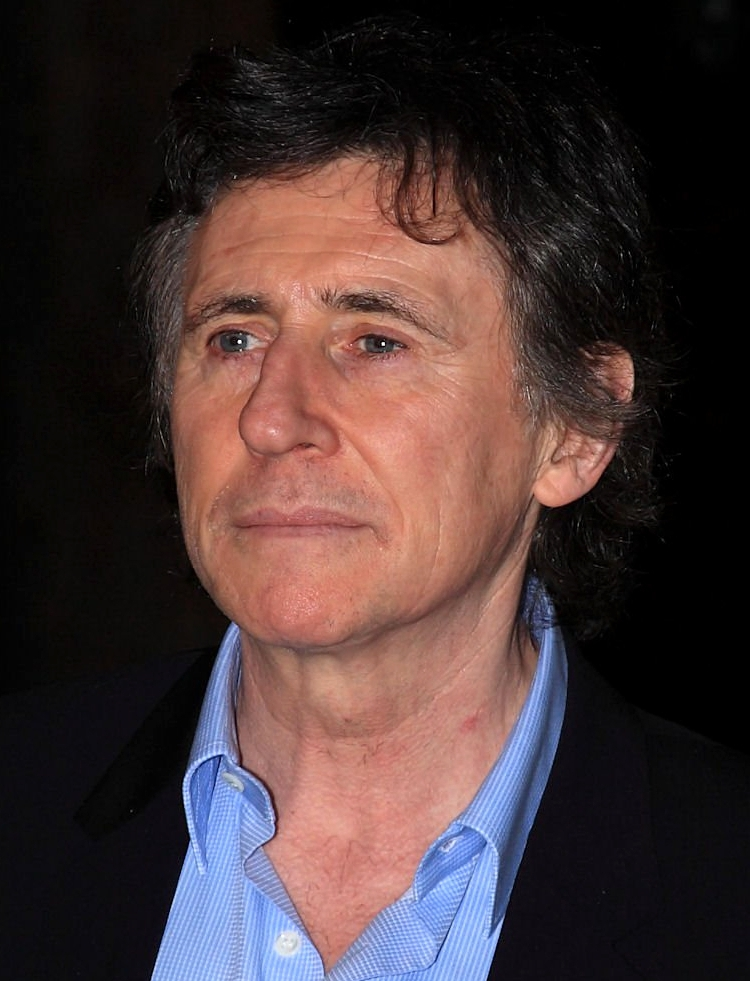
Arnold Schwarzenegger (pictured in 2003) and Gabriel Byrne (2010)
- Arnold Schwarzenegger as Detective Jericho Cane
- Gabriel Byrne as Satan
- Robin Tunney as Christine York
- Kevin Pollak as Bobby Chicago
- Rod Steiger as Father Kovak
- CCH Pounder as Marge Francis
- Derrick O'Connor as Thomas Aquinas
- Miriam Margolyes as Mabel
- Udo Kier as Doctor Abel
- Mark Margolis as Pope
- Victor Varnado as Albino
- Marc Lawrence as Old Man
- Denice D. Lewis as Emily Cane
- Renee Olstead as Amy Cane
- Mo Gallini as Monk (as Matt Gallini)

== Production ==
Directors Sam Raimi and Guillermo del Toro were offered the job, but turned it down due to other projects. Marcus Nispel was going to direct the film, but he left because of budget and script problems and was replaced by Peter Hyams.

The role of Jericho Cane was written for Tom Cruise, but he chose to work on Magnolia, and Arnold Schwarzenegger was then cast in March 1998. Liv Tyler was the first choice for the role of Christine York, but she declined over contractual issues. Kate Winslet was then set to play the character, but she dropped out and Robin Tunney replaced her. According to Hyams,

Jim Cameron was the kind of godfather of me doing that film, because of his relationship with Schwarzenegger. He told me I was doing it! ... End Of Days was going to be Marcus Nispel, but it wasn't working somehow, but they had Arnold and a start date, and Jim came to me and told me I had to do it. This was the first picture Arnold had made for a couple of years. I think he had a heart thing. So this was Arnold coming back. And he wanted to try to make something good, and to take some chances. I applauded that. And we had very, very good actors around him, like Gabriel Byrne and Kevin Pollak and Rod Steiger. It was a very enjoyable experience. Half way through shooting I told Arnold I thought he should die in this movie. Of course Universal blanched at the idea, so I shot the ending both ways, and everybody agreed that the dying ending was the better one.

Over 60 visual effects shots were created by Rhythm & Hues.

In 2016, actress Miriam Margolyes complained about Arnold Schwarzenegger's behavior on set. In 2022, Margolyes' reported that he farted in her face while on set. Schwarzenegger did not respond to the allegations.

The film was heavily promoted by the WWE, then WWF, with Schwarzenegger appearing live on the November 11, 1999 episode of SmackDown! where he was presented with an honorary championship belt, and the main cast took part in several taped interviews that aired on all WWF programming in the lead up to the film's release. The WWF were also given exclusive access on the red carpet of the film's premiere, interviews from which were also shown on their programming.

== Music ==
=== Soundtrack ===
The film's soundtrack primarily contains tracks by industrial rock and alternative metal bands. It features "Oh My God", the first song released by the "new line-up" of Guns N' Roses. During the editing of End of Days, soundtrack songs were overlaid in scenes that are usually silent in thriller films. In several scenes, a sample from Spectrasonics' "Symphony of Voices" is heard. The score for the film is composed by John Debney and conducted by Pete Anthony.

== Release ==
End of Days opened in North American theaters alongside Toy Story 2 on November 24, 1999, and was released on DVD and VHS on April 18, 2000. It would also be released on HD DVD on September 26, 2006, and later on Blu-ray on August 26, 2008, after the discontinuation of the HD DVD format.

Scream Factory, under license from Universal, released an Ultra HD Blu-ray edition on October 7, 2025, commemorating the film's 25th anniversary. This release contains a new 4K remaster of the film sourced from a scan of the original camera negative, approved by director Hyams, as well as newly recorded interviews with Hyams and other crew members involved in the film's production, plus archival bonus material from previous releases.

== Reception ==
=== Box office ===
End of Days grossed $31 million in the United States and Canada from its five-day Wednesday opening. With a gross of $20.5 million in its opening 3-day weekend, it ranked third place at the US box office behind Toy Story 2 and The World Is Not Enough. The film went on to gross $66,889,043 in the United States and Canada and $145.1 million elsewhere, for a worldwide total of $212 million, against a budget estimated at $100 million. Although it was profitable because of strong international revenue and DVD sales, its final numbers fell short of Universal Studios' expectations. Schwarzenegger received a salary of $25 million for his role in the film.

=== Critical response ===
Review aggregator Rotten Tomatoes gives the film an 11% "Rotten" score, based on 103 critic reviews with an average rating of 3.8/10. The site's consensus states: "An overblown thriller with formulaic action scenes and poor acting." Metacritic gives the film a weighted average score of 34/100 based on 33 critics, indicating "generally unfavorable" reviews. Audiences polled by CinemaScore gave the film an average grade of "B−" on an A+ to F scale.

Newsweek wrote that "Peter Hyams's lurid, FX-happy thriller slams pieces of a dozen other movies into a noxious new compound. It has to be seen to be believed, but who'd want to?", while Mark Kermode called it "idiotic beyond the point of redemption, this sinfully stupid farrago manages to insult audiences and critics, Christians and Satanists alike, reducing 2000 years of fertile mythology to the level of an incoherent pop video." USA Today called Schwarzenegger's performance "among his worst" noting that he "seems to have trouble with his lines and doesn't get to make his trademark wisecracks". The Los Angeles Times's critic Eric Harrison called it "bloodless as a cyborg, and it feels as if it has been assembled according to diagrams supplied by someone who studied every successful sci-fi action thriller and then multiplied the findings by 10". Janet Maslin of The New York Times wrote that End of Days is "as incoherent about its mysticism as it is about anything else".

However, there were a few mixed reviews. Mick LaSalle of the San Francisco Chronicle stated that "there are moments in End of Days when Schwarzenegger seems to be gunning for an Oscar", but "those moments play like comic relief". James Berardinelli called it "a deliciously bad motion picture", while Roger Ebert stated that "End of Days involves a head-on collision between the ludicrous and the absurd" giving it two stars out of four. In a retrospective editorial twenty years since the film's release, Bloody Disgusting highlighted how the film "is always fascinating and entertaining".

Schwarzenegger later said that he thought Hyams was "the wrong director" for the film. "He did not have the potential... I think visually and intellectually to really do something with that movie, but he was recommended by James Cameron, so we thought 'Well he must know.'"

=== Accolades ===
End of Days was nominated for three Razzie Awards—Worst Actor (Arnold Schwarzenegger), Worst Supporting Actor (Gabriel Byrne) and Worst Director (Peter Hyams)—and was pre-nominated for Worst Picture, but it was withdrawn shortly before the awards ceremony.

It also received a nomination from the Motion Picture Sound Editors for Best Sound Editing - Effects & Foley as well as two nominations in the Blockbuster Entertainment Awards for Favorite Actor - Action/Science Fiction and for Favorite Supporting Actor - Action/Science-Fiction for Arnold Schwarzenegger and Kevin Pollak respectively.

== See also ==
- List of American films of 1999
- Arnold Schwarzenegger filmography
