= When Worlds Collide =

1933 novel co-written by Edwin Balmer and Philip Wylie

- First edition published by Frederick A. Stokes
- Author: Edwin Balmer & Philip Wylie
- Language: English
- Genre: Science fiction novel
- Published: 1933 (Frederick A. Stokes)
- Publication place: United States
- Media type: Print (hardback & paperback)
- Pages: 344 pp
- Followed by: After Worlds Collide

When Worlds Collide is a 1933 science fiction novel co-written by Edwin Balmer and Philip Wylie; they also co-authored a sequel, After Worlds Collide (1934). It was first published as a six-part monthly serial (September 1932 through February 1933) in Blue Book magazine, illustrated by Joseph Franké.

== Synopsis ==
Sven Bronson, a Swedish astronomer working at an observatory in South Africa, discovers a pair of rogue planets, Bronson Alpha and Bronson Beta, which will soon enter the Solar System. In eight months, they will pass close enough for gravitational forces to cause catastrophic damage to the Earth. Sixteen months later, after swinging around the Sun, Bronson Alpha (a gas giant) will return to pulverize the Earth and depart. Bronson Beta (discovered to be Earth-like and potentially habitable) may remain and assume a stable orbit.

Men and women recruited by American astrophysicist Cole Hendron work desperately to build an atomic rocket capable of transporting enough people, animals, and equipment to Bronson Beta to stave off extinction. Other countries do the same. Eve Hendron, Cole's assistant and daughter, becomes convinced that God has provided Bronson Beta to give humanity a second chance, just as He did with Noah.

Coastal regions are evacuated in preparation for the first encounter. As the planets approach, telescopes reveal cities on Bronson Beta. Tidal waves sweep inland at a height of 750 feet (230 m), volcanic eruptions and earthquakes add to the deadly toll, and the weather runs wild for more than two days. Bronson Alpha grazes and destroys the Moon.

Aferward, three men receive permission from Hendron to take a floatplane to check out conditions across the United States. They meet with the President in Hutchinson, Kansas, the temporary capital of the United States. All three are wounded fighting off a mob at their last stop, but manage to return with a precious sample of an extremely heat-resistant metal one of them had noticed. This solves the last remaining engineering obstacle: no material had previously been found that could make rocket tubes capable of withstanding the heat of the atomic exhaust for very long.

Five months before the end, desperate mobs attack the camp, killing over half of Hendron's people. When the survivors can hold no longer, they retreat to the rocket, as ordered by Hendron. They then take off, hover, and blast the enemy with their deadly exhaust.

With the rocket tube breakthrough, they are able to build a second, larger ship that can carry everyone left alive (instead of only 100 of the roughly thousand people Hendron had recruited). The two American ships take off, but lose contact with each other. Other ships are seen launching from Europe; the French ship's tubes melt, causing it to crash. The original American ship lands successfully, but it is unknown whether anyone else made it. The survivors find that Bronson Beta is habitable. They also find a road.

The sequel, After Worlds Collide, details the fate of the survivors on Bronson Beta.

== Adaptations and influences ==
When Worlds Collide had far-reaching influences on the science fiction genre. The themes of an approaching planet threatening the Earth, and an athletic hero, his girlfriend, and a scientist traveling to the new planet by rocket, were used by writer Alex Raymond in his 1934 comic strip Flash Gordon. (Note: Raymond took the basic premise of Philip Wylie's When Worlds Collide, which was being reprinted in Blue Book magazine at the time, and used it as his starting point for adventure.) Jack Williamson's 1934 short story "Born of the Sun" also used the concept of a scientist and his fiancée escaping the destruction of the Earth in a hurriedly constructed "ark of space". The 1940–1941 newspaper comic strip Speed Spaulding, an adaptation credited to the novel's authors, was more directly based on the novel. The themes of escape from a doomed planet to a habitable one also can be seen in Jerry Siegel and Joe Shuster's 1938 comic Superman.

The novel was adapted as the 1951 film When Worlds Collide, produced by George Pal and directed by Rudolph Maté, which in turn was adapted into a comic book by George Evans in Motion Picture Comics #110 (Fawcett Comics, May 1952).

In 2012, the British composer Nigel Clarke wrote a large-scale work for brass band inspired by the film and likewise titled When Worlds Collide.

== See also ==
- Impact events in fiction
- Rogue planets in fiction
- Worlds in Collision, a 1950 book of pseudoscientific speculation by Immanuel Velikovsky
