= Alien Ant Farm discography =

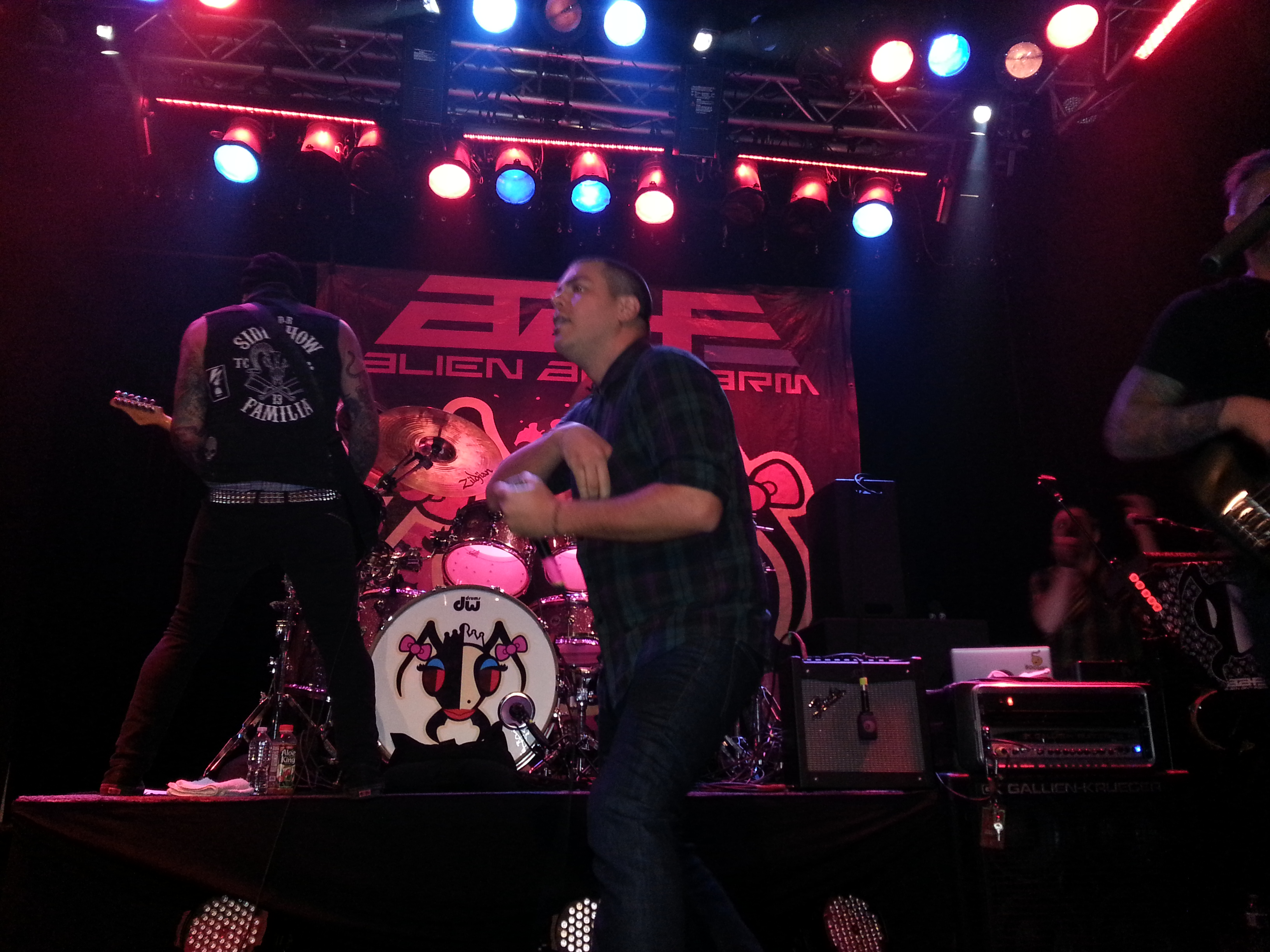
- Studio albums: 6
- Extended plays: 3
- Live albums: 1
- Compilation albums: 1
- Singles: 9
- Music videos: 14

American rock band Alien Ant Farm has released six studio albums, one live album, one compilation album, three extended plays, and nine singles and music videos.

== Albums ==
=== Studio albums ===
Title	Details	Peak chart positions										Certifications (sales threshold)
Title	Details	US	AUS	AUT	FIN	GER	NLD	NZ	SWE	SWI	UK	Certifications (sales threshold)
Greatest Hits	Release date: February 1999; Label: Chick Music; Format: CD	—	—	—	—	—	—	—	—	—	—	
Anthology	Release date: March 6, 2001; Label: DreamWorks (0044-50293); Format: CD, CS, DL	11	18	32	13	20	44	24	58	45	11	RIAA: Platinum; ARIA: Platinum; BPI: Platinum; MC: Platinum; RMNZ: Gold
Truant	Release date: August 19, 2003; Label: DreamWorks (0600445045842); Format: CD, CD+DVD-V, CS, DL	42	—	—	—	—	—	26	—	71	68	
Up in the Attic	Release date: July 18, 2006; Label: New Door/UM^{e}/El Tonal (B0006823); Format: CD, DL	114	—	—	—	—	—	—	—	—	—	
Always and Forever	Release date: February 24, 2015; Label: EMG/The End/ADA (EMED1231); Format: CD	—	—	—	—	—	—	—	—	—	—	
Mantras	Release date: April 26, 2024; Label: Chick Music; Format: CD, DL	—	—	—	—	—	—	—	—	—	— (Note: "Mantras" did not enter the UK Albums Chart, but peaked at number 87 on the UK Albums Downloads Chart.)	
"—" denotes releases that did not chart

=== Compilation albums ===
Title	Details
20th Century Masters: The Millennium Collection: The Best of Alien Ant Farm	Release date: May 20, 2008; Label: Geffen

=== Live albums ===
Title	Album details
Alien Ant Farm: Live In Germany	Release date: May 29, 2009; Label: Geffen

== Extended plays ==
Title	EP details
Singles: $100 EP	Release date: June 18, 1996; Label: Self-released
Love Songs EP	Release date: 1998; Label: Self-released
EP Phone Home	Release date: 2014; Label: Self-released (crowdfunded through PledgeMusic)

== Singles ==
Title	Year	Peak chart positions										Certifications (sales threshold)	Album
Title	Year	US	US Alt	AUS	BEL	EUR	GER	NZ	SCO	SWI	UK	Certifications (sales threshold)	Album
"Movies"	2001	—	18	29	— (Note: "Movies" did not enter the Flanders Ultratop 50, but peaked at four on the Flanders Ultratip chart.)	29	89	35	4	62	5	BPI: Silver; RMNZ: Gold	Anthology
"Smooth Criminal"	2001	23	1	1	3	6	5	4	3	4	3	ARIA: 2× Platinum; BEA: Gold; BPI: 2× Platinum; BVMI: Gold; IFPI SWI: Gold; RMNZ: 2× Platinum	Anthology
"Attitude"	2002	—	—	—	—	—	—	—	76	—	66		Anthology
"These Days"	2003	—	29	—	—	—	—	—	—	—	—		Truant
"Glow"	2003	—	—	98	—	—	—	5	—	—	—	RMNZ: Gold	Truant
"Forgive & Forget"	2006	—	—	—	—	—	—	—	—	—	—		Up in the Attic
"Let Em Know"	2013	—	—	—	—	—	—	—	—	—	—		Always and Forever
"Homage"	2014	—	—	—	—	—	—	—	—	—	—		Always and Forever
"Everything She Wants"	2020	—	—	—	—	—	—	—	—	—	—		Mantras
"So Cold"	2024	—	—	—	—	—	—	—	—	—	—		Mantras
"Fade"	2024	—	—	—	—	—	—	—	—	—	—		Mantras
"Last Dantz"	2024	—	—	—	—	—	—	—	—	—	—		Mantras
"Bad Attitude"	2025	—	—	—	—	—	—	—	—	—	—		—
"Actitud"	2026	—	—	—	—	—	—	—	—	—	—		—
"Reasons"	2026	—	—	—	—	—	—	—	—	—	—		—
"Gaslighter"	2026												
"—" denotes releases that did not chart

== Music videos ==
List of music videos and directors
Title	Year	Director	Album
"Movies"	2001	Marc Klasfeld	Anthology
"Smooth Criminal"	2001	Marc Klasfeld	Anthology
"Attitude"	2001	The Malloys	Anthology
"These Days"	2003	Marc Klasfeld	Truant
"Glow"	2003	Marc Klasfeld, Vem & Tony	Truant
"Drifting Apart"	2003		Truant
"She's Only Evil"	2006		Up in the Attic
"Around the Block"	2006		Up in the Attic
"Let Em Know"	2013		Always and Forever
"Everything She Wants"	2020		Mantras
"So Cold"	2024		Mantras
"Fade"	2024		Mantras
"Last Dantz"	2024		Mantras
"Storms Over"	2024		Mantras
"Bad Attitude"	2025	Bobby Hewitt	
"Actitud"	2026	Bobby Hewitt	
"Reasons"	2026		
