= Greatest Hits (Alien Ant Farm album) =

Studio album by Alien Ant Farm
- Released: February 1999
- Studio: 4th Street Recording ( Santa Monica, California)
- Genres: Alternative metal; experimental rock
- Length: 41:50
- Label: Chick Music
- Producers: Alien Ant Farm; Jim Wirt; Donat Kazarinoff (co.)

Alien Ant Farm chronology
Love Songs (1998)	Greatest Hits (1999)	Anthology (2001)

Greatest Hits is the debut studio album by the American rock band Alien Ant Farm, released in February 1999 through the band's own label, Chick Music. Despite its name, Greatest Hits is not a compilation album, and was intended to be tongue-in-cheek. To record the album, the band would sneak into a local studio overnight and work until the morning. Most of the songs were reworked on their next two albums, Anthology and Truant.

Alien Ant Farm was well known in their local scene. After the release of Greatest Hits, the band played numerous shows in California; they also had stops in Europe. Alien Ant Farm were well acquainted with fellow Californian rock band Papa Roach, and were the first act signed to Papa Roach's New Noize label in 2000. In 2005, the album was reissued with a thinner font. Miguel Martinez, who mixed some of this album, later died by suicide, and the track "Sleepwalker" from Up in the Attic was dedicated to his girlfriend.

Greatest Hits would win best independent album at the 9th annual LA Music Awards in 1999. On October 14, 2021, Tye Zamora posted an old homemade music video for this version of "Movies" on Facebook. It consisted of the band performing in a room, along with clips from various concerts.

== Track listing ==
All songs written by Alien Ant Farm, except "Slick Thief", written by Michael Jackson.

Greatest Hits track listing
No.	Title	Length
1.	"These Days"	3:50
2.	"Pink Tea"	4:09
3.	"Movies"	3:25
4.	"Dole Roll" (originally featured on Love Songs)	2:21
5.	"Denigrate"	4:18
6.	"Solution Time" (new version, originally featured on Love Songs)	4:22
7.	"S.S. Recognize" (new version, originally featured on the $100EP)	3:51
8.	"Nova Hands" (originally featured on Love Songs)	4:55
9.	"Universe" (originally featured on Love Songs)	5:36
10.	"Slick Thief" (cover of "Smooth Criminal" by Michael Jackson)	3:32
Total length:		41:50

== Personnel ==
Alien Ant Farm

- Dryden Mitchell – vocals; credited as "Songsayerer"
- Terence Corso – guitar; credited as "Guitarer"
- Tye Zamora – bass; credited as "Bassadilla"
- Michael Cosgrove – drums; credited as "Drummist"

Technical personnel

- Alien Ant Farm – producer
- Jim Wirt – producer, mixing (4, 8, 9)
- Donat Kazarinoff – co-producer, engineer, mixing (1, 2, 6, 7, 10)
- Miguel Martinez – mixing (3, 5), mastering
