= Neciosup =

Neciosup is a surname from the Mochica language. Notable people with the surname include:

- Alejandro Neciosup Acuña - Peruvian drummer and percussionist
- Hector "Pocho" Neciosup - Peruvian drummer and Alehandro's nephew
- Jair Neciosup - featured on backing vocals on Truant
- Don Alex Neciosup Alcántara - president of Carlos A. Mannucci in the 70s
