= Niyoki =

American gospel musician

- Also known as: Niyoki
- Born: Kedrah Niyoki White; November 15, 1973 (age 52); Fort Wayne, Indiana
- Origin: Nashville, Tennessee
- Genres: Christian R&B, gospel, contemporary R&B, urban contemporary gospel
- Occupations: Singer, songwriter
- Instruments: Vocals, singer-songwriter
- Years active: 2006–present
- Label: Executive Music Group

Kedrah Niyoki White (born November 15, 1973, as Kedrah Niyoki White), who goes by Niyoki Chapman and the stage name Niyoki, is an American gospel musician. Her first album, My Everything, was released by Executive Music Group alongside Dedicated 2 God Records in 2006. This album was a Billboard magazine breakthrough release upon the Gospel Albums chart. The subsequent album, Rest, was released in 2008 by those same two labels, and it charted on the aforementioned chart. She was a part of the girl group, Milenia, that got the chance to tour with Prince on the Hit n Run Tour in 2000 and 2001 before releasing their only album in 2006.

== Early life ==
Niyoki was born on November 15, 1973, as Kedrah Niyoki White, in Fort Wayne, Indiana. She is the third child of Pastor Clifford and Carolyn White, coming after an older brother and sister Kenny and Mikki respectively. Her two younger sisters are Malikah and Tia.

== Music career ==
Her music recording career commenced in 2006, with the album, My Everything, and it was released by Executive Music Group alongside Direct 2 God Records on August 29, 2006. This album was her breakthrough release upon the Billboard magazine Gospel Albums at No. 32. The subsequent album, Rest, was released on August 19, 2008, by the aforementioned record labels. Her album charted on the Gospel Albums chart at No. 50.

== Personal life ==
Niyoki was married to Clarence Nero, who is the CEO of Dedicated 2 God Records, and they had a son together, Kedron Nero, who was born on November 3, 2007. She would remarry on June 15, 2013, to Jay Chapman who she became a step-mother to his five-year-old daughter, at the time. She resides in Fort Wayne, Indiana, where she works at the Unity Performing Arts Foundation as Operations Manager.

== Discography ==
List of studio albums, with selected chart positions
Title	Album details	Peak chart positions
Title	Album details	US Gos
My Everything	Released: August 29, 2006; Label: Executive Music Group/Direct 2 God; CD, digital download	32
Rest	Released: August 19, 2008; Label: Executive Music Group/Direct 2 God; CD, digital download	50
