= Around the Block =

Around the Block may refer to:

- Around the Block (film), a 2013 Australian film
- "Around the Block", a song by Alien Ant Farm from their 2006 album Up in the Attic
- "Around the Block", a song by Parachute Express
