= Anthology (Alien Ant Farm album) =

Studio album by Alien Ant Farm
- Released: March 6, 2001
- Studio: NRG (North Hollywood, California)
- Genres: Alternative metal; nu metal; pop-punk
- Length: 56:39
- Labels: New Noize; DreamWorks
- Producer: Jay Baumgardner

Alien Ant Farm chronology
Greatest Hits (1999)	Anthology (2001)	Truant (2003)

Singles from ANThology
- 1. "Movies" Released: January 16, 2001; 2. "Smooth Criminal" Released: May 22, 2001; 3. "Attitude" Released: May 13, 2002

Anthology (stylised as ANThology) is the second studio album and major label debut studio album by American rock band Alien Ant Farm. It was released on March 6, 2001, through New Noize and DreamWorks Records. Following the self-release of the band's debut studio album, Greatest Hits (1999), they played several showcases in Los Angeles, California. At the end of 2000, Alien Ant Farm started recording their next album with producer Jay Baumgardner at NRG Recording Studios in North Hollywood, California. Their music was influenced by alternative metal, nu metal and pop-punk, and critics compared the album to the works of Incubus and A Perfect Circle.

"Movies" was released as Anthology's lead single in January 2001. Alien Ant Farm signed with Papa Roach's label, New Noize, before embarking on a United States cross-country tour with Linkin Park and Taproot, and supporting Orgy on their headlining tour. Following a two-week stint in Europe supporting Papa Roach, "Smooth Criminal" was released as the album's second single in June 2001. They appeared on that year's Warped Tour, and then re-released "Movies" in early 2002. The band toured Australia, New Zealand, Europe, and the US. The third single, "Attitude", was released in May 2002.

Anthology received generally positive reviews from music critics, some of whom commented on Alien Ant Farm's energy and the songs' diversity. The album charted at number 11 on the US Billboard 200, while also reaching the top 40 in Australia, Austria, Belgium, Finland, Germany, Ireland, and New Zealand. It would later be certified platinum in Canada, the United Kingdom, and the US. "Smooth Criminal" peaked at number 23 on the US Billboard Hot 100, alongside performing well on several Billboard component charts, and reached number one in Australia. "Movies" had some success on several Billboard component charts, while "Attitude" only charted in the UK.

== Background and production ==
Vocalist Dryden Mitchell, guitarist Terry Corso, bassist Tye Zamora, and drummer Mike Cosgrove formed Alien Ant Farm in 1996. Zamora and Cosgrove previously played in a Primus cover band. The same year as forming, the band released their debut EP $100 EP, and followed it up with their second EP Love Songs in 1998. Alien Ant Farm self-released their debut studio album Greatest Hits through their own record label Chick Music Records. It later won the award for Best Independent Album at the 1999 LA Music Awards. The band promoted the album with a tour in Europe, appearances at various festivals, and played several showcases in Los Angeles, California, in an attempt to secure a deal with another record label. After playing several shows together, Alien Ant Farm became well-acquainted with Papa Roach. When Papa Roach achieved commercial success, they were given ownership of the New Noize record label.

Alien Ant Farm was shopping around for a record deal, and an A&R person from New Noize eventually found them. While Alien Ant Farm was in Europe, producer Jay Baumgardner, known for his work with Korn and Slipknot, attended a Papa Roach show. A demo of Alien Ant Farm covering "Smooth Criminal" (1987) by Michael Jackson was playing over the speakers, which caught Baumgardner's attention. A month later, after producing Infest (2000) by Papa Roach, the A&R representative for that band contacted Baumgardner: "'This band, Alien Ant Farm, I think I should sign them.’ I said, ‘Yeah, they do that cover of Michael Jackson. It’s incredible. I think it’s a hit.’ And he said, ‘Would you do the record if I sign them?’ I said, ‘Yeah!'" By this time, nu metal had becoming the dominant strain of rock music, replacing alternative rock and grunge.

At the end of 2000, Alien Ant Farm were recording their next album at NRG Recording Studios in North Hollywood, California, with Baumgardner. The band's enjoyed his work with the likes of Orgy and Papa Roach. Alien Ant Farm recorded two songs with him, before spending a month writing material. The rehearsal studio they used was located opposite Baumgardner's studio, which allowed him to witness what the band were working on at any given moment. They would tape ideas with a recorder, by which point, Mitchell would listen to it in his car and they would then come up with parts to add to it. During recording, James Murray acted as engineer and operated Pro Tools, with assistance by Justin Harvey; John Ewing and Brian Viture did additional Pro Tools work. Baumgardner cited Pro Tools as an important piece of equipment as it enabled them to "chop things up and edit things", and said that Linkin Park, one of the band's contemporaries, "epitomized what you could do with Pro Tools in rock". Mitchell said Baumgardner did not alter the songs that much, save for some "real minor stuff", such as switch parts around. Baumgardner mixed the recordings at NRG, with help from Daniel Certa, before Tom Baker mastered Anthology at Precision Mastering in Hollywood.

== Composition and lyrics ==
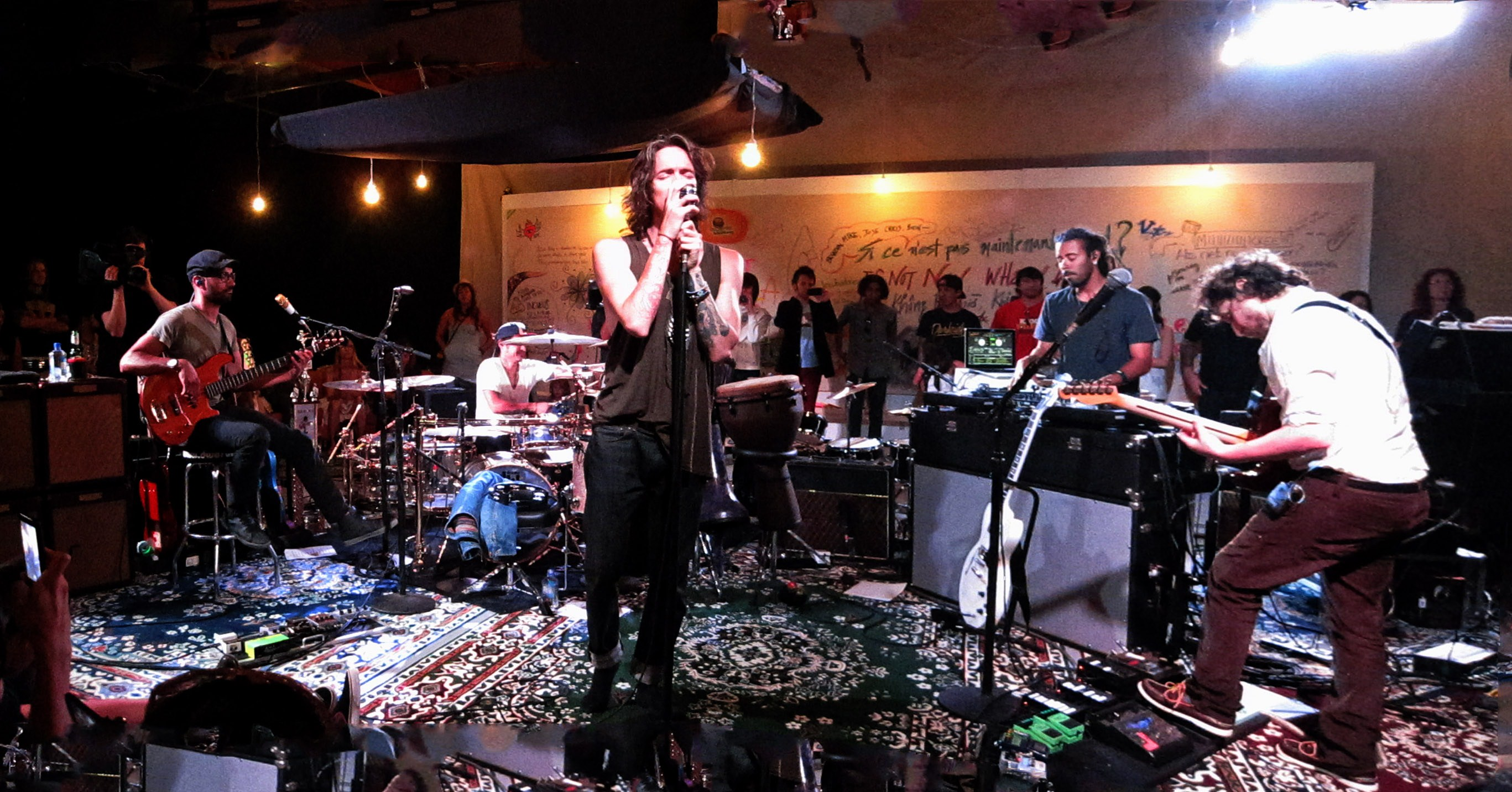
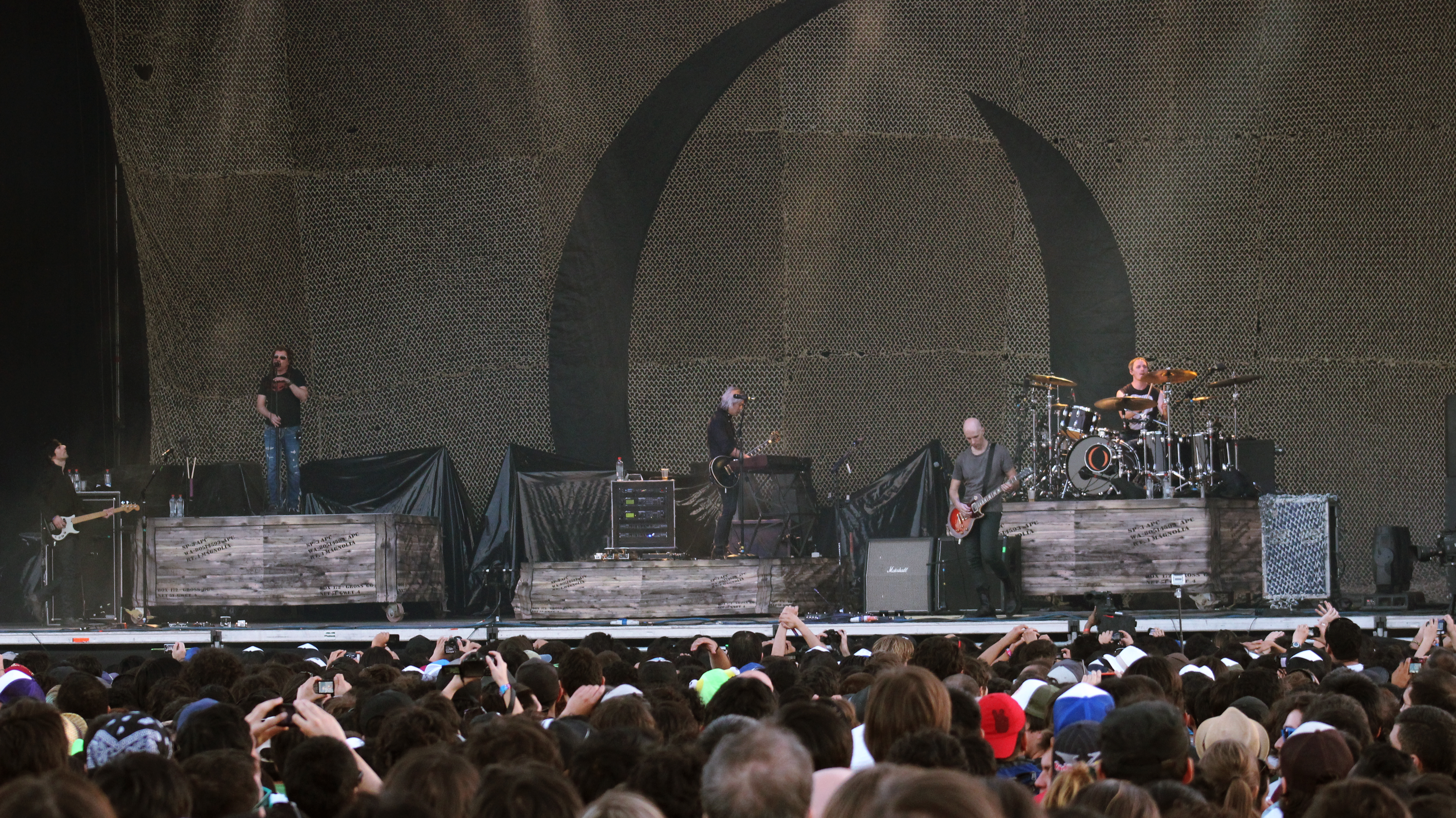
Anthology drew comparison to the work of Incubus (top) and A Perfect Circle (bottom).

Critics have described the musical style of Anthology as alternative metal, nu metal and pop-punk, with it taking influence from alternative rock, and drawing comparisons to Make Yourself (1999) by Incubus and Mer de Noms (2000) by A Perfect Circle. The band attempted vocal harmonies in the vein of the Electric Light Orchestra, Steely Dan, and Queen. Mitchell's vocals were compared to Maynard James Keenan of Tool, and he wrote many of the tracks during the breakup of a relationship. The opening track "Courage" details a relationship which has reached its breaking point. "Movies" uses staccato guitar parts against a funk-esque bassline. Mitchell said the song is about comparing a relationship to cinema. "Flesh and Bone" recalls the Police with Cosgrove's reggae-esque drum rhythms; Tye Zamora's brother Jon contributed additional background vocals to the song. At the suggestion of Zamora, Mitchell wrote the lyrics around religion, asking questions about people's beliefs. "Whisper" is an attack on the music industry; Cosgrove said it was about being turned down by labels after doing showcases for them.

The guitarwork in "Sticks and Stones" earned it a comparison to the work of Helmet and Prong. "Attitude" has a Latin beat, with percussion by Toto member Lenny Castro. The song is from the perspective of a girl expressing her anger, with the narrator explaining that her boyfriend is worse off. "Stranded" includes slide guitar by Dredg vocalist Gavin Hayes; "Wish" is the first-ever song Alien Ant Farm wrote and is indebted to the band's metal roots. "Smooth Criminal" is done in the nu metal style. Mitchell, whose first ever concert experience was seeing Jackson, explained that during one performance, Cosgrove and Zamora played a short snippet of it, which caught the attention of the crowd. Cosgrove subsequently bought a cassette of Bad so that the band could learn the track. The closing track "Universe" features a string arrangement by David Campbell. The hidden track "Orange Appeal" incorporates slide guitar by Hayes and flute by Yanick Vincent. It is a demo that dates from the band's first month of existence; Corso said they "kept putting stuff on top of. It was cool enough in the end to actually go on the album".

== Release and touring ==
=== Initial promotion and "Smooth Criminal" single ===
"Movies" was released as the lead single from Anthology to radio in January 2001. Alien Ant Farm toured the West Coast of the United States in January and February 2001, followed by a cross-country trek with Linkin Park and Taproot. Anthology was released on March 6, 2001, on New Noize and DreamWorks Records. Discussing the album's title, Mitchell said: "We called our first independent record Greatest Hits. And in a sense, a lot of bands' first record is their greatest hits because they are soon gone. [...] So we thought it would be funny to do ANThology for our second record since we already did our greatest hits." Around this time, Alien Ant Farm were supporting Orgy on the Vapor Transmission Tour. The music video for "Movies", which was directed by Marcos Siega, premiered via MTV2 on March 17, 2001. Mitchell said it was filmed over the course of 18 hours, "and no one was feeling the 'movie' vibe". Alien Ant Farm was due to support Papa Roach on a US headliner; however, it was canceled. Instead, they went on a club tour of the US West Coast, and supported Papa Roach on their European tour for two weeks.

"Smooth Criminal" was released as Anthology's second single to US radio stations on June 12, 2001. The band had no plans to release the track as a single until it started gaining airplay from WXRK-FM, based in New York City. The European CD version featured "Orange Appeal", "Denigrate", and the "Smooth Criminal" music video; the UK version swapped "Orange Appeal" for "Movies". The music video for "Smooth Criminal", which was directed by Marc Klasfeld, sees the band performing in the middle of a boxing ring. Mitchell explained that either their label or MTV was attempting to connect the band with a soundtrack for the WWE. Klasfeld, who was living in New York City, had heard the song playing while in a gym. He was a popular video director that mainly worked with hip hop acts by likes of Insane Clown Posse and Nelly. His initial reaction upon hearing the cover was to laugh: "I saw the sense of humor in it. I just thought it was hilarious that a metal band was covering Michael Jackson. It was perfectly within my sensibility". He promptly contacted Alien Ant Farm's label with the aim of working with them, which was in contrast from labels and artists contacting him first.

=== "Movies" re-release and further promotion ===
"Movies" was released in Europe on June 18, 2001, and includes "Pink Tea" and a live acoustic version of "Movies" as the B-sides, alongside the music video for "Movies". Alien Ant Farm appeared on the 2001 Warped Tour between June and August. Afterwards, they performed at the Reading and Leeds Festivals in the United Kingdom. Alien Ant Farm took a few weeks off for the Christmas holidays, before touring Australia and New Zealand in early 2002. "Movies" was re-released as a single on February 4, 2002. The band decided to reissue "Movies", after the success of "Smooth Criminal", in an attempt to get the song to chart. Mitchell said that a number of radio pluggers "felt that ‘Movies’ was a big hit that got yanked a wee bit too early. Now that there’s some familiarity with the band, they want to try it again". The CD version included live versions of "Movies" and "Smooth Criminal", along with a new music video for the former. The new video was shot over three hours with Klasfeld, and was described by Corso as "really moving and action-packed". The video shows the band in a theatre watching a movie; the members jump into the screen and become a part of the film. The rest of the video has the band in costumes, such as the Ghostbusters from Ghostbusters (1984) and Oompa-Loompas from Willy Wonka & the Chocolate Factory (1971), as they perform the song.

After a two-week stint in Europe, Alien Ant Farm returned to the US, and toured as part of the 2002 SnoCore Tour. "Attitude" was released as a UK single on May 13, to coincide with a tour there in the same month. The CD version included a remix and live acoustic versions of "Attitude", alongside live versions of "Universe" and "Stranded", and the music videos for the former two tracks. While traveling to a show, Alien Ant Farm was involved in a road accident near to Cáceres, Spain. Initial reporting said that the bus driver was killed, and Mitchell and Zamora ended up in hospital. The following day, the band explained they had been involved in a head-on collision, leaving their driver dead, and their security guard in critical condition. Six of Alien Ant Farm's crew members were also injured and taken to hospital with the band's members. Mitchell had sustained back injuries, and Cosgrove suffered a broken ankle. Zamora had foot injuries, while Cosgrove had cuts and bruises. Mitchell was moved to a special facility in London; he had a vertebral fracture, which prompt a metal rod being inserted into his back to stabilize his condition. A week after the incident, the band canceled all of their shows for the rest of the month, and into June 2002. They returned to performing in December as part of the charity showcase Drum Day in Los Angeles.

=== Related events and releases ===
"Movies", "Attitude" and "Smooth Criminal" were included on the band's first compilation album, The Best of Alien Ant Farm (2008). These three, plus "Sticks and Stones", were included on the band's second compilation album, Icon (2013); the European edition expanded the selection to include "Courage", "Flesh and Bone", "Whisper", "Summer", "Stranded", "Wish" and "Death Day". In January 2016, Alien Ant Farm performed Anthology in full on a tour of the UK, with support from InMe and the Dirty Youth. A second leg was held in October and November 2016 with support from Hed PE, Kaleido and Sumo Cyco.

== Critical reception ==
Professional ratings
Aggregate scores
Source	Rating
Metacritic	65/100
Review scores
Source	Rating
AllMusic	4/5 stars
The Boston Phoenix	2.5/5 stars
Dotmusic	7/10
Drowned in Sound	10/10
E! Online	B
laut.de	3/5 stars
Melodic	3/5 stars
NME	6/10
Rolling Stone	3.5/5 stars
Wall of Sound	62/100

Anthology was met with generally favorable reviews from critics. At Metacritic, the album received an average score of 65, based on six reviews.

Drowned in Sound writer Terry Bezer compared the band's sound to Incubus in April 2001, and wrote that Alien Ant Farm "offer a widely diverse set of tunes and [sic] all of which are of the highest standard", with Anthology containing "all you could ever want from a debut album and a whole lot more". He cited the band's "[l]ive-wire energy, powerful tunes from start to finish and, most importantly, a sense of unpredictability". Dotmusic's Chris Heath wrote Alien Ant Farm break "new ground [...] by exploring far more than the quiet-loud-rage-quiet formula with real singing and everything and a fair [dose] of pop melody". AllMusic reviewer Mario Mesquita Borges noted the album displays "the band's alternate dexterity, not only due to [...] Mitchell's revealing vocals, but also by virtue of their deliverance of full-blooded melodies". The staff at E! Online called the album "[m]ore diverse than you might think [...] mak[ing] this one Ant Farm that'll keep your attention".

Rolling Stone reviewer Barry Walters wrote that the band "boasts the mosh power of Papa Roach, but with a lot more ingenuity, tunes and chops, as if Korn had half-morphed into Cheap Trick". Sean Richardson of The Boston Phoenix said they were "no carbon-copy P-Roach imitation" as he felt that Mitchell was not as "angry or tortured" as their frontman Coby Dick. Wall of Sound's Daniel Durchholz considered Alien Ant Farm to be showing "some real potential. They're pissed, sure — who isn't these days? But the important thing is that the members of the band have a talent for songcraft." Kitty Empire of NME found Mitchell to be "over-emot[ing] at every turn [...] further slickening 'ANThology's pomp rock gloss". She added that they are "trying to make a mountain of an ant hill, where we'd be content with a record that just rocks". Melodic webmaster Johan Wippsson singled out "Movies" and "Smooth Criminal", before then noting that "the rest of the album isn't that special". He added, "[i]t's not bad at all, just a little bit uninteresting".

More negatively, 2014 Tom Hawking Flavorwire included the album in his list of "The 50 Worst Albums Ever Made". He wrote: "Worst band. Worst band name. Worst pun-tastic album title. Worst Michael Jackson cover. Worst, worst, worst."

== Commercial performance ==
Anthology peaked at number 11 on the US Billboard 200. Outside of the US, it charted at number 11 in the UK, number 13 in Finland, number 18 in Australia, number 20 in Germany, number 21 in Ireland, number 22 in Belgium, number 24 in New Zealand, number 32 in Austria, and number 40 in Scotland. The album was later certified platinum by Music Canada in Canada, platinum by the British Phonographic Industry (BPI) in the UK, platinum by the Recording Industry Association of America (RIAA) in the US. Additionally, it received a gold certification by both the Australian Recording Industry Association (ARIA) in Australia and Recorded Music NZ (RMNZ) in New Zealand.

"Smooth Criminal" reached number 23 on the US Billboard Hot 100. It also appeared on several Billboard component charts: number one on Alternative Airplay, number 12 on Mainstream Top 40, number 17 on Active rock, number 18 on Mainstream Rock Songs, number 23 on Radio Songs, and number 27 on Heritage Rock. Outside of the US, it peaked at number one in Australia, number two in Finland, number three in the UK, number four in New Zealand and Switzerland, number five in Sweden, and number six in Austria. The song was certified double platinum in Australia by the ARIA, and platinum in the UK by the BPI.

"Movies" appeared on several Billboard component charts: number 18 on Alternative Airplay, number 35 on Active Rock, and number 38 on Mainstream Rock Songs. It also charted at number five in the UK, number 29 in Australia, number 35 in New Zealand, and number 62 in Switzerland. "Movies" was certified silver in the UK by the BPI, while "Attitude" reached number 66 in the UK.

== Track listing ==
Track listing per booklet. All recordings produced by Jay Baumgardner.

Anthology track listing
No.	Title	Length
1.	"Courage"	3:30
2.	"Movies" (new version; originally recorded for Greatest Hits)	3:15
3.	"Flesh and Bone"	4:28
4.	"Whisper"	3:25
5.	"Summer"	4:15
6.	"Sticks and Stones"	3:16
7.	"Attitude"	4:54
8.	"Stranded"	3:57
9.	"Wish" (new version; originally recorded for the $100 EP)	3:22
10.	"Calico"	4:10
11.	"Death Day" (titled "Happy Death Day" on digital versions)	4:33
12.	"Smooth Criminal" (new version; originally recorded for Greatest Hits, titled "Slick Thief".)	3:29
13.	"Universe" (new version; originally recorded for Love Songs)	9:07
Total length:		55:41

- Attached to the last song, which ends at 5:53, is a hidden track called "Orange Appeal", originally recorded for the $100 EP.

== Personnel ==
Personnel per booklet.

Alien Ant Farm

- Dryden Mitchell – lead vocals, acoustic guitar
- Terry Corso – guitars, acoustic guitar
- Tye Zamora – bass, backing vocals, upright bass, keyboards, additional guitars
- Mike Cosgrove – drums

Additional musicians

- David Campbell – string arrangement on "Universe"
- Lenny Castro – percussion on "Attitude"
- Gavin Hayes – slide guitar on "Stranded" and "Orange Appeal"
- Yanick Vincent – flute on "Orange Appeal"
- Jon Zamora – additional background vocals on "Flesh and Bone"

Production

- Jay Baumgardner – producer, mixing
- Tom Baker – mastering
- James Murray – engineer, Pro Tools
- Justin Harvey – assistant
- Daniel Certa – mix assistant
- John Ewing – additional Pro Tools
- Brian Virtue – additional Pro Tools
- PR Brown – art direction, design and photography
- Ralf Strathmann – band photo

== Charts ==
=== Weekly charts ===
Weekly chart performance for Anthology
Chart (2001)	Peak position
Australian Albums (ARIA)	18
Austrian Albums (Ö3 Austria)	32
Belgian Albums (Ultratop Flanders)	22
Dutch Albums (Album Top 100)	44
Finnish Albums (Suomen virallinen lista)	13
German Albums (Offizielle Top 100)	20
Irish Albums (IRMA)	21
New Zealand Albums (RMNZ)	24
Scottish Albums (Official Charts)	40
Swedish Albums (Sverigetopplistan)	58
Swiss Albums (Schweizer Hitparade)	45
UK Albums (Official Charts)	11
US Billboard 200	11
US Heatseekers Albums (Billboard)	1

=== Year-end charts ===
2001 year-end chart performance for Anthology
Chart (2001)	Position
Australian Albums (ARIA)	97
Canadian Albums (Billboard)	70
UK Albums (OCC)	96
US Billboard 200	79

2002 year-end chart performance for Anthology
Chart (2002)	Position
Canadian Metal Albums (Billboard)	70
Canadian Alternative Albums (Billboard)	145
UK Albums (OCC)	189
US Billboard 200	110

== Certifications ==
Certifications for Anthology
Region	Certification	Certified units/sales
Australia (ARIA)	Platinum	70,000^{^}
Canada (Music Canada)	Platinum	100,000^{^}
New Zealand (RMNZ)	Gold	7,500^{‡}
United Kingdom (BPI)	Platinum	300,000^{‡}
United States (RIAA)	Platinum	1,000,000^{‡}
^{^} Shipments figures based on certification alone.^{‡} Sales+streaming figures based on certification alone.
