= Laura Roppé =

American singer

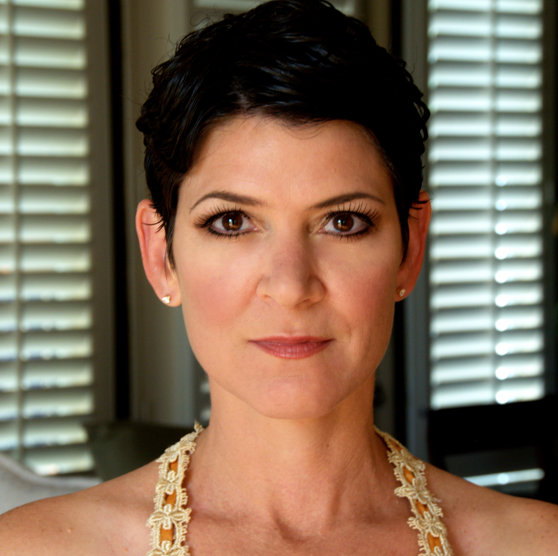

Background information
- Origin: San Diego, California
- Genres: acoustic, country, rock
- Occupations: singer-songwriter, author
- Instrument: Vocals
- Years active: 2007–present
- Website: www.LauraRoppé.com

Laura Roppé is an American singer-songwriter and author from San Diego, California. Her first album, Girl Like This, was self-released in 2008. Shortly afterwards, she was diagnosed and underwent cancer treatment, and her second album, I'm Still Here, led to her reaching No. 3 on Billboard Magazine's Uncharted Artists list in 2011. Her memoir Rocking the Pink: Finding Myself on the Other Side of Cancer was released on Amazon.com in Winter of 2012.

Laura Roppé was raised in San Diego, California, and first got her musical start performing in high school plays. After high school, she attended UCLA School of Theater, Film, and Television as a theater major, where she was classmates with actors Jack Black, Michael Goorjian, and Marco Sanchez. She graduated UCLA in 1991, and then attended law school at the University of San Diego graduating second in her class.

Roppé married and began raising children while working as a San Diego attorney.

== Music career ==
After completing her first marathon in 2006, she made a personal vow to resume music. Later that year she became vocalist of the cover band CoolBandLuke, which covered artists as varied as Led Zeppelin, Janis Joplin, Blondie, Lucinda Williams, and Kelly Clarkson.

=== Girl Like This (2008) ===
In 2007, Roppé was inspired by the completion of a second marathon to release an album of original songs within the year. In early 2008, she made a demo with her cousin Matthew Embree of Rx Bandits. She brought her material to Grammy-nominated producer Steve Wetherbee, who encouraged her to make a full-length album. On August 13, 2008, Roppé self-released her first album Girl Like This, where she wrote all the tracks.

Reception

In May 2008, Roppé was named runner-up in Kenny Chesney's Next Big Star Contest in San Diego for the single of the album "Mama Needs a Girls' Night Out."

In August 2008 Roppé gave a copy of her new CD to "Little Tommy" Sablan, the producer of her favorite radio morning show. The next day her song "Float Away" aired on WSTR Star 94.1, with Sablan quoting on air "I was blown away by the production and the sound. I just like the sound of her voice"; it became a station staple. Roppé then won second place in the 2008 New Country 95.7 local talent competition, and she was signed by a United Kingdom label to distribute the album overseas.

Cancer

In October 2008, Roppé was informed she had triple-negative breast cancer. She immediately left her job as an attorney and underwent surgery, along with seven months of chemotherapy and radiation treatments. She was declared cancer-free in 2009, although she was not in full remission. Throughout the ordeal Roppé continued to write music.

Later tour

Afterwards in 2009, Girl Like This was nominated for Album of the Year, and the single "Float Away" won American Single of the Year at the Los Angeles Music Awards in Hollywood, California. She promptly launched a tour in the United Kingdom to support the album. It reached No. 5 on the Amazon.com UK charts.

=== I'm Still Here (2011) ===
In 2011, Roppé released her second album, I'm Still Here. Many of the tracks had been written while Roppé was undergoing cancer treatments. The album was produced by her cousin Matthew Embree.

Reception

The February 2011 edition of Maverick Magazine said the album was a five-star "must-have," and music blog Wildy's World called it a "brilliant and emotionally naked artistic turn." By February 9, 2011, Billboard Magazine had ranked Roppé as number six worldwide on their Uncharted Music Chart, which is a listing of the Top 50 emerging artists with significant internet presence. As of May 19, 2011, Roppé had remained on the Uncharted Billboard for over 23 weeks, with a peak number of 3.

=== YouTube singles ===
During her treatments, Roppé wrote a single entitled "George Clooney". She uploaded a music video of the track onto YouTube in mid-January 2011, and within 24 hours it gained over 20,000 views. It obtained 50,000 views during its first week, and charted Top 30 or higher on YouTube in thirteen countries. It also earned her an interview with Billboard. The single also charted on Myspace.

Around the release of "George Clooney," she also posted an animated video for her song "Heart Inside a Palm," which amassed over 250,000 hits in five days.

Her latest "I’m Still Here" video has surpassed a million YouTube views and had over 13,000 views during its first 12 hours online.

=== Style ===
Roppé has stated "My music is an eclectic and organic blend of Americana, pop, rock, blues, country, even a sprinkling of bluegrass when the mood strikes me. It's melodic...and typically happy and hopeful. Though sometimes a bit testy, if I have something urgent to say."

== Book ==
In 2010, Roppé worked on a memoir about her experiences undergoing cancer treatment. She signed a book deal with Seal Press, an imprint of Perseus Books Group in New York City, to publish the memoir Rocking the Pink: Finding Myself on the Other Side of Cancer. It was released February 28, 2012, on Amazon.com. She said that “My book is a life adventure/self-realization/love story/music/cancer memoir.”

== Personal life ==
Roppé is currently married and has two daughters.

== Discography ==
- Girl Like This (2008)
- I'm Still Here (2011)
