= Fame Awards =

The FAME Awards may refer to:

- The Fans of Adult Media and Entertainment Award
- The Film, Art, Music, and Entertainment Awards, an awards program of the LA Music Awards
