= Shock of Pleasure =

Electro-lounge band based in Dallas, Texas

Background information
- Origin: Dallas, Texas, United States
- Genres: Electronica, pop, trip hop, downtempo
- Years active: 2004–present
- Labels: Executive Music Group
- Members: Robert Romano; Brent Irish; Kelley Christian; Josh Curry
- Past members: Bobby Friske; Shelley Gaither
- Website: shockofpleasure.com

Shock of Pleasure is an electro-lounge band based in Dallas, Texas. Formed in 2004 by singer/songwriter Robert Romano (formerly of Stranger than Fiction), Shock of Pleasure have toured nationally in support of two national releases through the Universal Music/Fontana Label. The debut release, "It's About Time" has been played on over 25 commercial stations and 50 college stations throughout the US and Canada. The first single, "This is a Test" has been featured on an episode of the ABC Family's "Wildfire" as well as the Electronic Arts video game "The Sims 2: Apartment Life". The track was also selected as a finalist for the 2008 International Songwriting Competition. The second single "Spacetime" won 3rd place (electronica) for the 2008 Billboard World Songwriting Contest.

SHOCK OF PLEASURE has Appeared in 5 National Industry Recognized Charts:
KKBB ARTIST/ALBUM SPECIALTY CHART RANK: 14
KKBB SPECIALTY SINGLES CHART RANK: 8 (Spooky)
FMQB SPECIALTY SINGLES CHART RANK: 12
CMJ: #5 MOST ADDED RECORD IN THE NATION (14 ADDS - RPM CHART #1078)

== It's About Time ==
Shock of Pleasure's debut CD, written by Robert Romano and produced by David Castell, was originally released in 2007 by the Executive Music Group before being re-released nationally the following year by the Universal Music Group's Fontana Label. The CD has received critical acclaim, accruing a list of accomplishments that include the No. 16 spot on the CMJ music charts in February 2008 (Source Issue #1047), appearances on nationally syndicated radio shows like The Lex and Terry Show, play on the ABC Family Channel show Wildfire, dance remixes of the songs in clubs across the country, and regular rotation on dozens of radio stations. "This is a Test" and "Spacetime" were both featured on American Airlines and Virgin America In-Flight Radio in 2008 and 2009. The 2008 re-release added two additional tracks (reinvigorated covers of The Carpenters' "Superstar" and the Dennis Yost classic "Spooky"), both of which were included in Esquire Magazines 1892 Ultimate Cover Songs.

== Discography ==
Mystery Loves Company (Stranger than Fiction 1993)
Fate (Stranger than Fiction 1995)
Vertigo (Stranger than Fiction 1998)
The Great Snowflake Conspiracy (Stranger than Fiction 2000)
It's About Time (2008)
Not My Angel (2009)
