= Marc Klasfeld =

American music video director

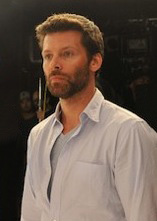
- Born: United States
- Education: NYU Tisch School of the Arts
- Occupations: Music video director; commercial director
- Website: marcklasfeld.com

Marc Klasfeld is an American music video director. He has directed music videos for acts such as Slipknot, Sum 41, Katy Perry, Jay-Z, Red Hot Chili Peppers, Britney Spears, Kid Rock, Michael Bublé, Nelly, Foo Fighters, Kelly Clarkson, Charli XCX, Little Mix, Nick Jonas, Twenty One Pilots, Avril Lavigne, Aerosmith, Charlie Puth.

In 2015, Klasfeld directed the music video for Wiz Khalifa and Charlie Puth's "See You Again", which for less than a month held the record for the most-viewed video on YouTube, surpassing Psy's "Gangnam Style" on July 10, 2017, but was later surpassed by Luis Fonsi and Daddy Yankee's "Despacito" on August 4, 2017. He is also the founder of Rockhard, a music video production company that has produced videos for Justin Bieber, Lady Gaga, LMFAO, Britney Spears, Aerosmith, Prince, Mariah Carey, Kelly Rowland, Jessie J, Pixie Lott, Adam Lambert, and Big Time Rush among others.

He has also directed television commercials for Target, Nike, NFL, NBA, Motorola, Reebok, Cartoon Network and Hummer. His best-known commercial work is for Justin Timberlake's Target campaign, ESPN's This Is SportsCenter campaign, Hammer Pants Dance for the A&E Network's reality show Hammertime, Avril Lavigne's Canon campaigns and Smirnoff's Green Tea Partay viral video sung by Sebastian Siegel.

On March 29, 2010, Klasfeld released a comedic video of an elementary school reenactment of the Al Pacino film Scarface, entitled "Scarface School Play". It was shown on CNN, CBS, ABC, NBC and Fox News.

In 2026, Klasfeld directed Do Not Enter, a horror thriller film based on David Morrell's novel Creepers. On July 11, 2022, it was announced that Lionsgate and Suretone Pictures would co-produce the film, then titled Creepers. On July 29, 2022, it was announced that Jake Manley, Adeline Rudolph in her film debut, Francesca Reale, Laurence O'Fuarain, Nicholas Hamilton, Javier Botet, and Skylan Brooks were cast in the film. In August 2022, it was announced that Shane Paul McGhie replaced Brooks and that filming occurred in Bulgaria.

== Partial videography ==
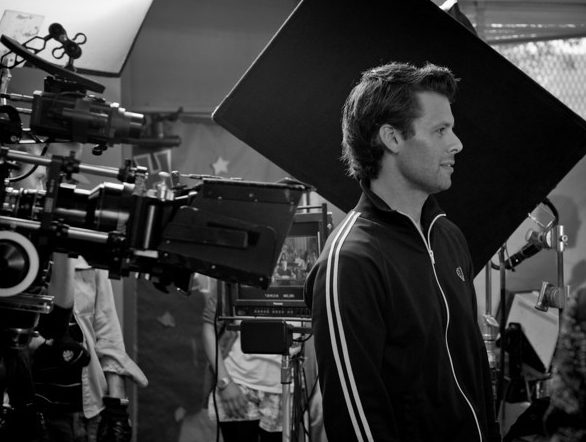
Klasfeld on set

Year	Artist	Video
1994	Eric Roberson	"The Moon"
1997	Born Jamericans	"Yardcore"
1997	Jeru the Damaja	"Me or the Papes"
1997	Kim English	"Learn 2 Luv"
1997	Three 6 Mafia	"Tear da Club Up '97"
1997	Dead Prez	"Food, Clothes & Shelter"
1998	Juvenile	"Ha"
1998	Canibus	"I Honor U"
1998	Shaggy	"Luv Me, Luv Me"
1999	Juvenile	"Follow Me Now"
1999	B.G.	"Cash Money Is An Army"
1999	Clipse	"The Funeral"
1999	8Ball & MJG	"We Started This"
1999	Rakim	"When I B On Tha Mic"
1999	Kottonmouth Kings	"Bump"
2000	Cam'ron	"My Hood"
2000	Cam'ron	"What Means the World to You"
2000	Dope	"Everything Sucks"
2000	Nelly	"Country Grammar (Hot Shit)"
2000	Shyne	"Bad Boyz"
2000	Shyne	"That's Gangsta"
2000	Hed PE	"Bartender"
2000	Insane Clown Posse	"Let's Go All the Way"
2000	Insane Clown Posse	"Tilt-a-Whirl"
2000	Cuban Link	"Why Me?"
2000	Dave Hollister	"One Woman Man"
2000	Sticky Fingaz	"Get It Up"
2000	Shade Sheist	"Where I Wanna Be"
2001	Dirty	"Hit da Floe"
2001	Musiq Soulchild	"Love"
2001	St. Lunatics	"Midwest Swing"
2001	Alien Ant Farm	"Smooth Criminal"
2001	Alien Ant Farm	"Movies"
2001	Jay Z	"Girls, Girls, Girls"
2001	Ludacris	"Area Codes"
2001	Nelly	"Batter Up"
2001	Nelly	"Ride wit Me"
2001	Bad Ronald	"Let's Begin"
2001	D12	"Fight Music"
2001	*NSYNC	"Girlfriend"
2001	Saliva	"Click Click Boom"
2001	Bubba Sparxxx	"Ugly"
2001	Sum 41	"Fat Lip"
2001	Sum 41	"In Too Deep"
2002	3 Doors Down	"When I'm Gone"
2002	Bon Jovi	"Misunderstood"
2002	Vanessa Carlton	"A Thousand Miles"
2002	Vanessa Carlton	"Ordinary Day"
2002	Jermaine Dupri & Ludacris	"Welcome to Atlanta"
2002	Floetry	"Floetic"
2002	Enrique Iglesias	"Don't Turn Off the Lights" (Unreleased Version)
2002	Handsome Devil	"Makin' Money"
2002	Ms. Jade	"Ching Ching"
2002	*NSYNC & Nelly	"Girlfriend" (The Neptunes Remix)
2002	Pastor Troy	"Are We Cuttin'"
2002	Scarface	"On My Block"
2002	Sum 41	"It's What We're All About"
2002	Sum 41	"Still Waiting"
2002	Sum 41	"The Hell Song"
2002	Tom Jones	"International"
2003	Alien Ant Farm	"These Days"
2003	Alien Ant Farm	"Glow"
2003	Bon Jovi	"All About Lovin' You"
2003	Boomkat	"The Wreckoning"
2003	Foo Fighters	"Times Like These" (Second Version)
2003	Hot Action Cop	"Fever for the Flava"
2003	Jewel	"Intuition"
2003	Michelle Branch	"Breathe"
2003	Thursday	"War All the Time"
2004	Destiny's Child	"Lose My Breath"
2004	Sum 41	"We're All to Blame"
2004	Slipknot	"Vermilion Pt. 2"
2005	Backstreet Boys	"Just Want You to Know"
2005	Shinedown	"Save Me"
2005	Simple Plan	"Untitled (How Could This Happen to Me?)"
2005	Bloodhound Gang	"Foxtrot Uniform Charlie Kilo"
2005	Avenged Sevenfold	"Bat Country"
2005	Simple Plan	"Crazy"
2005	Juvenile	"Rodeo"
2006	Ashley Parker Angel	"Let U Go"
2006	DMX	"Lord Give Me a Sign"
2006	Gnarls Barkley	"Smiley Faces" (Banned Version)
2006	Kelis	"Bossy"
2006	Kelis	"Blindfold Me"
2006	Nerina Pallot	"Everybody's Gone to War"
2006	Taking Back Sunday	"MakeDamnSure"
2007	Shop Boyz	"Party Like a Rockstar"
2007	Chamillionaire & Slick Rick	"Hip Hop Police"/"Evening News"
2007	Vanessa Carlton	"Nolita Fairytale"
2007	Kelis	"Lil Star"
2007	The Last Goodnight	"Pictures of You"
2007	Avril Lavigne	"When You're Gone"
2007	Musiq Soulchild	"Teachme"
2007	Sum 41	"Underclass Hero"
2008	Vanessa Carlton	"Hands on Me"
2008	Coheed and Cambria	"Feathers"
2008	Against Me!	"Stop!"
2008	Electrik Red	"Drink in My Car"
2008	Low vs Diamond	"Heart Attack"
2008	Margot & the Nuclear So and So's	"As Tall as Cliffs"
2008	The Script	"The Man Who Can't Be Moved"
2008	Young Jeezy	"Crazy World"
2009	Nerina Pallot	"Real Late Starter"
2009	3OH!3 & Katy Perry	"Starstrukk"
2009	Jadakiss	"Can't Stop Me"
2009	Orianthi	"According to You"
2010	Against Me!	"I Was a Teenage Anarchist"
2010	Asher Roth	"G.R.I.N.D (Get Ready It's a New Day)"
2010	Biffy Clyro	"Bubbles"
2010	Sky Ferreira	"Obsession"
2010	Nelly	"Move That Body"
2010	Far East Movement ft. Ryan Tedder	"Rocketeer"
2010	James Blunt	"So Far Gone"
2010	Flo Rida	"Club Can't Handle Me"
2010	Kid Rock	"Born Free"
2010	Nipsey Hussle	"Feelin' Myself"
2011	The Wombats	"Anti-D"
2011	Katy Perry	"Last Friday Night (T.G.I.F.)"
2011	Rise Against	"Make It Stop (September's Children)"
2011	Red Hot Chili Peppers	"The Adventures of Rain Dance Maggie"
2011	Red Hot Chili Peppers	"Monarchy of Roses"
2011	Allstar Weekend	"Not Your Birthday"
2011	Big Time Rush	"If I Ruled the Earth"
2011	Big Time Rush	"Music Sounds Better with U"
2011	Greyson Chance	"Unfriend You"
2011	Pixie Lott	"All About Tonight"
2011	Nelly	"Gone"
2011	Rise Against	"Satellite"
2011	China Anne McClain	"Calling All the Monsters"
2011	Bella Thorne & Zendaya	"Watch Me"
2012	Cash Out	"Big Booty" (unreleased)
2012	Flo Rida	"I Cry"
2012	Flo Rida	"Whistle"
2012	fun. ft. Janelle Monáe	"We Are Young"
2012	The-Dream	"Roc"
2012	Rita Ora	"How We Do (Party)"
2012	Brit Smith	"Karma's a Bitch"
2012	Gym Class Heroes ft. Ryan Tedder	"The Fighter"
2012	Train	"50 Ways to Say Goodbye"
2012	Red Hot Chili Peppers	"Brendan's Death Song"
2012	Youngblood Hawke	"We Come Running"
2012	Aerosmith	"What Could Have Been Love"
2012	T.I. & Lil Wayne	"Ball"
2012	CeeLo Green & The Muppets	"All I Need Is Love"
2012	Bella Thorne & Zendaya	"Fashion Is My Kryptonite"
2012	Xia Junsu	"Uncommitted"
2012	Timbaland & Ne-Yo	"Hands in the Air"
2013	Michael Bublé	"It's a Beautiful Day"
2013	Jonas Brothers	"Pom Poms"
2013	Florida Georgia Line & Nelly	"Cruise (Remix)"
2013	T.I. & CeeLo Green	"Hello"
2013	Mayer Hawthorne	"Her Favorite Song"
2013	Britney Spears	"Ooh La La"
2013	2 Chainz	"Used 2"
2013	Robbie Williams	"Go Gentle"
2013	Icona Pop	"Just Another Night"
2014	Foxes	"Let Go for Tonight"
2014	Florida Georgia Line & Luke Bryan	"This Is How We Roll"
2014	Katy Perry	"Birthday"
2014	David Guetta	"Lovers on the Sun"
2014	Charli XCX	"Break The Rules"
2014	SomeKindaWonderful	"Reverse"
2014	Florida Georgia Line	"Sun Daze"
2014	Tokio Hotel	"Love Who Loves You Back"
2014	Azealia Banks	"Chasing Time"
2015	Kelly Clarkson	"Heartbeat Song"
2015	Florida Georgia Line	"Sippin' on Fire"
2015	Wiz Khalifa & Charlie Puth	"See You Again"
2015	Twenty One Pilots	"Tear in My Heart"
2015	Kacey Musgraves	"Biscuits"
2015	Silentó	"Watch Me (Whip/Nae Nae)"
2015	A Great Big World	"Hold Each Other"
2015	Andy Grammer	"Good to Be Alive (Hallelujah)"
2015	Charlie Puth & Meghan Trainor	"Marvin Gaye"
2015	Jesse & Joy & Alejandro Sanz	"No Soy Una de Esas"
2016	Awolnation	"Woman Woman"
2016	Fitz and the Tantrums	"HandClap"
2016	Nick Jonas	"Under You"
2016	Magic!	"Red Dress"
2016	Sum 41	"Fake My Own Death"
2016	Tiësto ft. John Legend	"Summer Nights"
2016	The Head and the Heart	"All We Ever Knew"
2016	Frances	"Say It Again"
2016	Biffy Clyro	"Howl"
2016	Maite Perroni	"Adicta"
2017	Romeo Santos	"Héroe Favorito"
2017	Highly Suspect	"My Name Is Human"
2017	Lukas Graham	"Drunk in the Morning"
2017	Little Mix feat. Machine Gun Kelly	"No More Sad Songs"
2017	DNCE feat. Nicki Minaj	"Kissing Strangers"
2017	Beartooth	"Sick of Me"
2017	Olly Murs x Louisa Johnson	"Unpredictable"
2017	Kid Rock	"Po-Dunk"
2017	CNCO & Little Mix	"Reggaetón Lento (Remix)"
2017	Sia	"Santa's Coming for Us"
2018	James Bay	"Wild Love"
2018	Liam Payne and J Balvin	"Familiar"
2018	Nevada feat. Loote	"Don't Call Me"
2018	Eros Ramazzotti	"Per le strade una canzone"
2018	Little Mix feat. Nicki Minaj	"Woman Like Me"
2018	JoJo Siwa	"Dream"
2018	Jessie J	"Queen"
2019	AMMF	"High Hopes"
2019	Mabel	"Mad Love"
2019	Noah Kahan	"Mess"
2019	JoJo Siwa	"Celebrate" & "BOP"
2019	Yella Beezy	"Rich MF"
2019	Las Villa	"Nadita"
2019	Emma Bunton	"Please Don't Stop"
2019	Evan Konrad	"Come On Snake, Let's Rattle"
2019	JoJo Siwa	"World Wide Party"
2019	Akon/Becky G	"Cómo No"
2019	Bon Jovi	"Limitless & Beautiful Day"
2019	Disney	"Just Gotta Rewind"
2019	Yo Gotti	"Pose"
2019	Ozzy Osbourne	"Straight to Hell"
2019	Ded	"Sex Sells"
2020	JoJo Siwa	"WWP Remix" & "Nonstop"
2020	Ozzy Osbourne	"Scary Little Green Men"
2020	Mattel	Cave Club
2020	JoJo	"Man"
2020	DED	"A Mannequin Idol (Lullaby)"
2020	AJ Mitchell	"Unstoppable"
2020	Lukas Graham	"Share That Love"
2021	The Offspring	"Let the Bad Times Roll"
2021	Idina Menzel	"Dream Girl (Nile Rodgers Remix)"
2021	Rick Ross ft. 21 Savage & Jazmine Sullivan	"Outlawz"
2022	MGK ft. Bring Me the Horizon	"Maybe"
2022	Pierce the Veil	"Emergency Contact"
2023	Limp Bizkit	"Out of Style"
2023	Tori Kelly	"Missin U"
2023	Pierce the Veil	"12 Fractures"
2024	Tori Kelly	"Thing U Do"
2024	JoJo Siwa	"Karma"
2024	JoJo Siwa	"Guilty Pleasure"
2024	Kiki Kramer	"relevant"
2025	JoJo Siwa	"Choose UR Fighter"
2025	The Offspring	"Ok, But This Is The Last Time"
2025	as1one	"Stranger"
2025	Sun Room	"Jackknife"
2025	Pierce the Veil	"Karma Police"
