= Always and Forever (Alien Ant Farm album) =

Studio album by Alien Ant Farm
- Released: February 20, 2015
- Studio: Groovemaster Studios (Chicago, Illinois)
- Genre: Alternative rock
- Length: 47:07
- Labels: EMG; The End; ADA
- Producers: Johnny K; Alien Ant Farm

Alien Ant Farm chronology
Up in the Attic (2006)	Always and Forever (2015)	Mantras (2024)

Singles from Always and Forever
- 1. "Let 'Em Know" Released: May 1, 2013; 2. "Homage" Released: September 23, 2014

Professional ratings
Aggregate scores
Source	Rating
Metacritic	61/100
Review scores
Source	Rating
AllMusic	3/5 stars
Punknews.org	2.5/5 stars
Sputnikmusic	3.3/5
Ultimate Guitar	5/10
Punk Rock Theory	3/5 stars

Always and Forever is the fifth studio album by Alien Ant Farm. The album features two singles: "Let 'Em Know", which was released on May 1, 2013, and "Homage", which was released on September 2, 2014. The latter received radio airplay on September 23, 2014.

This is the last album with Tye Zamora on bass, as he left the band after finishing recording in 2014.

== Track listing ==
No.	Title	Writer(s)	Length
1.	"Yellow Pages"	Dryden Mitchell; Terry Corso; Mike Cosgrove; Tye Zamora	3:15
2.	"Simpatico"	Mitchell; Corso; Cosgrove; Zamora	3:26
3.	"Burning"	Mitchell; Corso; Cosgrove; Rob Hawkins	3:13
4.	"Let 'Em Know"	Mitchell; Corso; Cosgrove; Ryan Marrone; Garrick Smith	3:15
5.	"Our Time" (featuring Zeale)	Mitchell; Corso; Cosgrove; CJ Eiriksson; Valin J Zamarron	3:44
6.	"Homage"	Mitchell; Corso; Cosgrove; Kenneth Springette; Maurice Eugene Willis	4:11
7.	"Sidelines"	Mitchell; Corso; Gosgrove; Neal Avron; Mike Green; Zamora	3:43
8.	"Little Things (Physical)"	Mitchell; Corso; Cosgrove; Johnny K	3:23
9.	"Crazy Love"	Mitchell; Corso; Cosgrove; Johnny K	3:42
10.	"American Pie"	Mitchell; Corso; Cosgrove; Monsters & Strangerz	3:52
11.	"Godlike"	Mitchell; Corso; Cosgrove; Zamora	3:30
12.	"Better Weather"	Mitchell; Corso; Cosgrove; Zamora	3:58
13.	"Dirty Bomb"	Mitchell; Corso; Cosgrove; Zamora	3:55

== Personnel ==
Alien Ant Farm

- Dryden Mitchell – vocals
- Mike Cosgrove – drums
- Terry Corso – guitar
- Timmy Pee – bass (credit only)

Additional musicians

- Tye Zamora – bass (all tracks)
- Pete Lucero, Scott Nelson, Kyrt Hensch – additional drums (7)
- Jay Terrien – strings contractor, string arrangements, conducting, and viola (6, 7, 10)
- Andrew Duckle – viola (6, 7, 10)
- Simone Vitucci, Leah Metzler – cello (6, 7, 10)
- Ricky Jackson – string editing (6)
- Kassondra Ackerman, Elizabeth Donkin, Sophie Martinkus – gang vocals (7)
- Charlie Richard – horn arrangement (7)
- Kevin Mayes, Matt Stratton, Henri Richardson – trumpet (7)
- Nate Wilson – tenor saxophone (7)
- Ian Baroni, Ben Ahsue, Andrew Alvarado, Prichard Pearce – trombone (7)
- Victor Alcarz, Jessica Ragsdale, Steven Ragsdale – percussion (7)

Technical personnel

- Johnny K – producer, engineer, mixing (1–3, 5, 7–13)
- Alien Ant Farm – producer
- Matt Dougherty – engineer
- Joe Zook – mixing (6)
- Jay Baumgardner – mixing (4)
- Ryan Lipman – assistant mix engineer (6)
- Brad Blackwood – mastering (1–5, 7–13)
- Chris Gehringer – mastering (6)
- David Cobb – digital editing
