= Mantras (Alien Ant Farm album) =

~mAntras~

Studio album by Alien Ant Farm
- Released: April 26, 2024
- Recorded: 2020–2023
- Genres: Alternative rock; alternative metal; post-grunge; pop-punk; hard rock
- Length: 40:52
- Labels: Chick Music; Megaforce
- Producers: Alien Ant Farm; Esjay Jones

Alien Ant Farm chronology
| Always and Forever (2015) | ~mAntras~ (2024) |

Singles from Mantras
- 1. "Everything She Wants" Released: May 8, 2020; 2. "So Cold" Released: January 19, 2024; 3. "Fade" Released: February 23, 2024; 4. "Last Dantz" Released: March 29, 2024

Mantras ratings
Review scores
| Source | Rating |
|---|---|
| Classic Rock | 6/10 |
| Melodic | 3/5 stars |
| Metal Hammer | 7/10 |

Mantras (stylized as ~mAntras~) is the sixth studio album by American rock band Alien Ant Farm, released on April 26, 2024 via the band's own label Chick Music, with distribution from Megaforce Records. It is the first studio album to feature Tim Peugh on bass, following Tye Zamora's departure in 2014. It is also their first studio album in 9 years, since Always and Forever in 2015.

== Background and composition ==
Alien Ant Farm released a cover of Wham!'s "Everything She Wants" on May 8, 2020, with the band announcing new original music was in the works that same day. The music video was released later that month, recorded during the COVID-19 pandemic, and featuring cameos from members of Insane Clown Posse, Hoobastank, P.O.D., 311, and more. Guitarist Terry Corso told Loudwire: "We'd been working on our first record in 6 years when the lockdown hit and basically halted all production. Luckily, we had a handful of songs recorded, mixed and ready to go, including our version of 'Everything She Wants' by Wham! The cover seemed like an obvious choice to inject some fun and happiness into a world that could really use it."

Mantras was announced on January 19, 2024, with the release of the single "So Cold" that same day. In a joint statement, the band stated "the new album might not be for the faint of heart, but it might be for the heart broken…" The band released "Fade" a month later on February 23, with vocalist Dryden Mitchell favorably comparing the track to the production of the DeLeo Brothers (Robert and Dean) on 2003's TruANT. The final single, "Last Dantz," followed on March 29, with Mitchell telling Kerrang!: "If someone asked me in the early days, what’s Ant Farm? I’d probably show you [2001's] "Sticks And Stones." From there we could twist and turn and go deeper, sadder, more technical, and all of the things that make Ant Farm stick out like the true black sheep of our time. But today I’d show you Last Dantz. From there we can go deeper, sadder, and more technical into all the things that make our music a cut above ourselves." The album came out on April 26, coinciding with the music video for "Storms Over."

Critics have described the musical style of Mantras as alternative rock, alternative metal, post-grunge, and pop-punk, with it featuring a harder rock sound than the band's previous, more punk-influenced albums. In his album deep dive with Kerrang!, Mitchell described certain tracks as "post-apocalyptic R&B," pop-metal, disco death metal, and rocksteady. Mitchell claimed that "Glasses" was a ballad he had been sitting on for roughly 15 years, while the title track was the band tinkering with overdubs from the aforementioned track, instead opting to sing certain lyrics from the band's prior releases.

== Track listing ==
All tracks are written by Alien Ant Farm, except where noted.

Mantras track listing
| No. | Title | Writer(s) | Length |
|---|---|---|---|
| 1. | "The Wrong Things" | Alien Ant Farm; Esjay Jones | 3:48 |
| 2. | "Last Dantz" | | 3:52 |
| 3. | "Fade" | Alien Ant Farm; Jones | 2:45 |
| 4. | "No. 1" | | 3:46 |
| 5. | "Storms Over" | Alien Ant Farm; Jones | 3:46 |
| 6. | "So Cold" | Alien Ant Farm; Jones | 3:41 |
| 7. | "What Am I Doing" | Alien Ant Farm; Jones | 3:52 |
| 8. | "Prosperous Futures" | | 4:12 |
| 9. | "Glasses" | | 4:18 |
| 10. | "Everything She Wants" (Wham! cover) | George Michael | 3:41 |
| 11. | "Mantras" | | 3:11 |
| Total length: | | | 40:52 |

Notes

- "Last Dantz" is stylized as "Last dAntz".
- "Everything She Wants" is stylized as "Everything She wAnts".
- "Mantras" is stylized as "~mAntras~".

== Personnel ==
Alien Ant Farm

- Dryden Mitchell – vocals
- Terry M. Corso – guitars
- Tim "Timmy Pee" Peugh – bass guitar
- Mike Cosgrove – drums, percussion

Additional musicians

- Patrick Hanlin – keyboards, Hammond B3, and additional percussion (9)

Technical personnel

- Alien Ant Farm – producers
- Esjay Jones – producer (1, 5, 7, 10)
- Lucas D'Angelo – mixing
- Ilan Benitam – mix assistant
- Will Borza – mastering
- Dave Cobb – engineer
- Mike Cosgrove – engineer, editing
- Sergio Chavez – editing

== Charts ==
Chart performance for Mantras
| Chart (2024) | Peak position |
|---|---|
| UK Album Downloads (Official Charts) | 87 |
| UK Rock & Metal Albums (Official Charts) | 35 |
