= Attitude (Alien Ant Farm song) =

2002 single by Alien Ant Farm

Single by Alien Ant Farm

from the album ANThology
- B-side: "Universe"; "Stranded"
- Released: March 18, 2002
- Length: 4:54
- Label: DreamWorks; Newnoize
- Songwriters: Tye Zamora; Dryden Mitchell; Mike Cosgrove; Terry Corso
- Producer: Jay Baumgardner

Alien Ant Farm singles chronology
"Movies" (re-release) (2001)	"Attitude" (2002)	"These Days" (2003)

"Attitude" is a song by American rock band Alien Ant Farm. It was included on their second studio album, ANThology, and was released on March 18, 2002, as the album's third and final single (fourth if counting the re-release of "Movies"). "Attitude" reached number 66 on the UK Singles Chart.

== Release ==
Though the song was never released as an official single in the US, it was released as the third single from "ANThology" in the UK and the rest of Europe. A number of track listings for the song's CD single exist. The song is included on the band's 2013 "Icon" greatest hits album.

== Commercial performance ==
The song debuted on the UK Singles chart on the chart dated May 25, 2002, at number 66. The following week, the song fell off of the chart. It was Alien Ant Farm's final single chart entry in the UK.

== Music video ==
A music video for the song was released in 2002. It mostly features the band performing the song, drinking, and pasting photographs onto a wall. The video was included on the band's "BUSted: The Definitive DVD" music video compilation.

== Track listings ==
UK CD1

1. "Attitude" – 4:54
2. "Universe" (live version) – 5:46
3. "Stranded" (acoustic version) – 4:11
4. "Attitude" (CD-ROM video) – 3:57

UK CD2

1. "Attitude" – 4:54
2. "Attitude" (acoustic live version) – 5:26
3. "Universe" (live video) – 5:46

UK cassette single

1. "Attitude" – 4:54
2. "Stranded" (acoustic version) – 4:11

European CD single

1. "Attitude" (radio remix)
2. "Universe" (live at The Quest, Minneapolis)

Australian CD single

1. "Attitude" (radio remix)
2. "Attitude" (live acoustic)
3. "Universe" (live at The Quest, Minneapolis)
4. "Stranded" (live acoustic)
5. "Attitude" (video)
6. "Universe" (video)

== Charts ==
Chart (2002)	Peak position
Scottish Singles Sales (Official Charts)	76
UK Singles (Official Charts)	66
UK Rock & Metal (Official Charts)	6

== Release history ==
Region	Date	Format(s)	Label(s)	Ref.
United States	March 18, 2002	Mainstream rock; active rock; alternative radio	DreamWorks; Newnoize	
United Kingdom	May 13, 2002	CD; cassette	DreamWorks; Newnoize	
