= Movies (Alien Ant Farm song) =

2001 single by Alien Ant Farm

Single by Alien Ant Farm

from the album Anthology
- Released: January 16, 2001
- Genre: Nu metal; punk rock; pop-punk
- Length: 3:15
- Label: DreamWorks
- Songwriters: Tye Zamora; Dryden Mitchell; Mike Cosgrove; Terry Corso
- Producer: Jay Baumgardner

Alien Ant Farm singles chronology
"Movies" (2001)	"Smooth Criminal" (2001)
"Smooth Criminal" (2001)	"Movies" (re-release) (2001)	"Attitude" (2002)

"Movies" is a song by American rock band Alien Ant Farm. It was released as their debut single on January 16, 2001, from their second studio album, Anthology (2001). Originally included on their 1999 album Greatest Hits, it was re-recorded (along with numerous other songs) for Anthology. It was re-released after the success of their second single, "Smooth Criminal". "Movies" peaked at number 18 on the US Billboard Modern Rock Tracks chart and became a top-five hit in the United Kingdom and a top-20 hit in Ireland. Some journalists consider it to be among the best nu metal tracks.

== Commercial performance ==
Upon its initial release, the song reached number 18 on the US Billboard Modern Rock Tracks chart and number 53 on the UK Singles Chart. After the band achieved success with "Smooth Criminal", they re-released the single on November 6, 2001. This time, it was a commercial success in the UK, reaching number five.

== Music videos ==
There were three music videos made for this single. One, which was shot before the success of "Smooth Criminal" revolves around the band playing at a house party, and the imagined events after they each pick up a different girl at the party.

The second video features a "behind the scenes" style shooting of the video, with grips and lighting crew interrupting shots to fix equipment, while the band performs before a tacky Hollywood sign backdrop.

There is a bigger budget re-shoot music video, released after the success of "Smooth Criminal", which shows the band jumping through the screen at a movie theater, and interacting with the audience in homages to Ghostbusters, Willy Wonka & the Chocolate Factory, The Karate Kid (including an appearance by the film's costar Pat Morita) and Edward Scissorhands. At the end of the video, the entire audience jumps through the screen and joins the band. This version was directed by Marc Klasfeld. In 2001, the band's record label DreamWorks Records was a subsidiary of the film studio DreamWorks Pictures, although none of the films referenced in the video were from DreamWorks, with the film studio itself having only started releasing films in late 1997.

== Track listings ==
UK CD single

1. "Movies" (album version) – 3:16
2. "Movies" (acoustic live at KROQ)
3. "Pink Tea"
4. "Movies" (CD-Rom video)

UK CD single re-release

1. "Movies" (album version)
2. "Smooth Criminal" (live in Denver)
3. "Movies" (live in Denver)
4. "Movies" (CD-Rom video)

UK cassette single

1. "Movies" (album version)
2. "Smooth Criminal" (live in Denver)

UK DVD single

1. "Movies" (DVD version)
2. "Movies" (acoustic live at KROQ)
3. "Calico" (live in Denver)

European CD single

1. "Movies" (album version) – 3:16
2. "Movies" (live acoustic version) – 3:12

Australian CD single

1. "Movies" (album version)
2. "Movies" (live acoustic version)
3. "Sticks & Stones" (live version)
4. "Movies" (video)

== Charts ==
=== Weekly charts ===
Chart (2001–2002)	Peak position
Australia (ARIA)	29
Belgium (Ultratip Bubbling Under Flanders)	4
Europe (Eurochart Hot 100)	29
Germany (GfK)	89
Ireland (IRMA)	13
New Zealand (Recorded Music NZ)	35
Scottish Singles Sales (Official Charts)	4
Switzerland (Schweizer Hitparade)	62
UK Singles (Official Charts)	5
UK Rock & Metal (Official Charts)	1
US Alternative Airplay (Billboard)	18
US Mainstream Rock (Billboard)	38

=== Year-end charts ===
Chart (2001)	Position
US Modern Rock Tracks (Billboard)	66

Chart (2002)	Position
UK Singles (OCC)	163
US Modern Rock Tracks (Billboard)	62

== Certifications ==
Region	Certification	Certified units/sales
New Zealand (RMNZ)	Gold	15,000^{‡}
United Kingdom (BPI)	Silver	200,000^{‡}
^{‡} Sales+streaming figures based on certification alone.

== Release history ==
Region	Date	Format(s)	Label(s)	Ref.
United States	January 16, 2001	Mainstream rock; active rock; alternative radio	DreamWorks	
United Kingdom	June 18, 2001	CD	DreamWorks	
Australia	July 16, 2001	CD	DreamWorks	
United States (re-release)	November 5, 2001	Alternative radio	DreamWorks	
United States (re-release)	January 11, 2002	Mainstream rock; active rock radio	DreamWorks	
United Kingdom (re-release)	February 4, 2002	CD; cassette	DreamWorks	
