= Smooth Criminal =

1988 single by Michael Jackson

Single by Michael Jackson

from the album Bad
- B-side: "Smooth Criminal" (instrumental)
- Released: October 13, 1988
- Recorded: November 1986 – April 1987
- Studio: Westlake (studio D), Los Angeles, California
- Genre: Synth-funk; pop; R&B
- Length: 4:18 (album version); 4:10 (single mix); 7:46 (extended dance mix)
- Label: Epic
- Songwriter: Michael Jackson
- Producers: Quincy Jones; Michael Jackson (co.)

Michael Jackson singles chronology
"Another Part of Me" (1988)	"Smooth Criminal" (1988)	"Leave Me Alone" (1989)

Audio sample
- file; help

"Smooth Criminal" is a song by the American singer Michael Jackson, released on October 13, 1988, as the seventh single from his seventh studio album, Bad (1987). It was written by Jackson and produced by Jackson and Quincy Jones. The lyrics describe a woman named "Annie" who has been attacked in her apartment.

The music video for "Smooth Criminal", which premiered internationally on MTV on October 13, 1988, is the centerpiece of the 1988 film Moonwalker. The 1930s setting and Jackson's white suit and fedora pay tribute to the Fred Astaire 1953 musical film The Band Wagon. In the video, Jackson and the dancers perform an apparently physically impossible "anti-gravity lean".

"Smooth Criminal" reached number seven on the Billboard Hot 100, becoming the sixth top-10 single from Bad. It reached number two on the Billboard Hot Black Singles chart. It was certified double platinum in the US. It reached number one in Belgium, Iceland, the Netherlands, and Spain.

Retrospective reviews have praised "Smooth Criminal" as a standout track on the Bad album and one of Jackson's best songs. Rolling Stone wrote that it was "his best blend of R&B groove and rock edginess, and a turning point in his shift toward darker, harder-edged material". It has appeared on numerous greatest hits albums and was performed on all of Jackson's solo tours. "Smooth Criminal" was re-released in 2006 as a single as a part of Jackson's Visionary: The Video Singles boxset. In 2001, a nu metal version by Alien Ant Farm became an international hit.

== Composition ==
"Smooth Criminal" evolved from an earlier song written by Jackson, "Al Capone" (named after real life gangster Al Capone), released on the 2012 reissue Bad 25. It is in the key of A minor, and Jackson's vocal spans from G_{3} to C_{6}. The lyrics describe a narrator who finds a bloodstained carpet and an unconscious body. The chorus refrain, "Annie, are you OK?", was inspired by Resusci Anne, a dummy used in cardiopulmonary resuscitation (CPR) training. Trainees learn to say "Annie, are you OK?" while practicing resuscitation on the dummy. The original mix of the song includes the sound of Jackson's fast-thumping heart and heavy breathing, which travel from left to right thanks to Hugo Zuccarelli's Holophonics system.

== Chart performance ==
"Smooth Criminal" peaked at number seven on the Billboard Hot 100, becoming the sixth top 10 single from Bad. It is certified double platinum in the US and in the UK. The song reached number one in Belgium, Iceland, the Netherlands and Spain and the top 10 in Denmark, France, Germany, Ireland, Italy, Switzerland and the UK.

== Music video ==
Jackson performing the "anti-gravity lean" in the "Smooth Criminal" music video

Jackson asked Vincent Paterson to conceive a music video. Paterson listened to the unfinished song and proposed a 1930s gangster club. Paterson, who was a lead dancer in the music videos for "Beat It" and "Thriller", co-choreographed the "Smooth Criminal" video with Jackson and Jeffrey Daniel of the soul music group Shalamar. The video and Jackson's white suit and fedora pay tribute to the Fred Astaire 1953 musical film The Band Wagon, particularly the "Girl Hunt Ballet" (itself inspired by the novels of Mickey Spillane) scene. The video, directed by Colin Chilvers, was shot between mid-February and April 1987 at Culver City, California, and in the backlot at Universal Studios Hollywood and premiered internationally on MTV on the night of October 13, 1988.

In the video, Jackson and the other dancers perform a lean that appears physically impossible. The dancers lean forward 45 degrees with their backs straight and feet flat on the floor, and hold the pose before returning upright. The lean moves the body's center of mass further than it can support. The illusion was achieved using cables and a harness. In October 1993, Jackson's team were granted a patent on a method of performing the lean in concert using specially designed shoes that hook into pegs that rise from the stage. Even with the shoes, the move requires good core strength.

The video won Best Music Video at the 1989 Brit Awards and the Critic's Choice awarded Jackson the "Best Video" award and the People's Choice Awards for "Favorite Music Video" for that same year. In 2019, the television personality Kim Kardashian bought Jackson's "Smooth Criminal" fedora, which still had his makeup on it, for her daughter North West. The style of clothing as well as mannerisms Jackson portrayed were reused in the numerous adaptations of the video game Michael Jackson's Moonwalker. The song serves as the background music for the "Club 30s" stage, the nightclub seen in the music video, that appears in the game. The video is the centerpiece of the 1988 film Moonwalker. On October 23, 2024, the video achieved 1 billion views on YouTube, making it the fifth of Jackson's videos to reach this milestone after "Billie Jean", "They Don't Care About Us", "Beat It" and "Thriller".

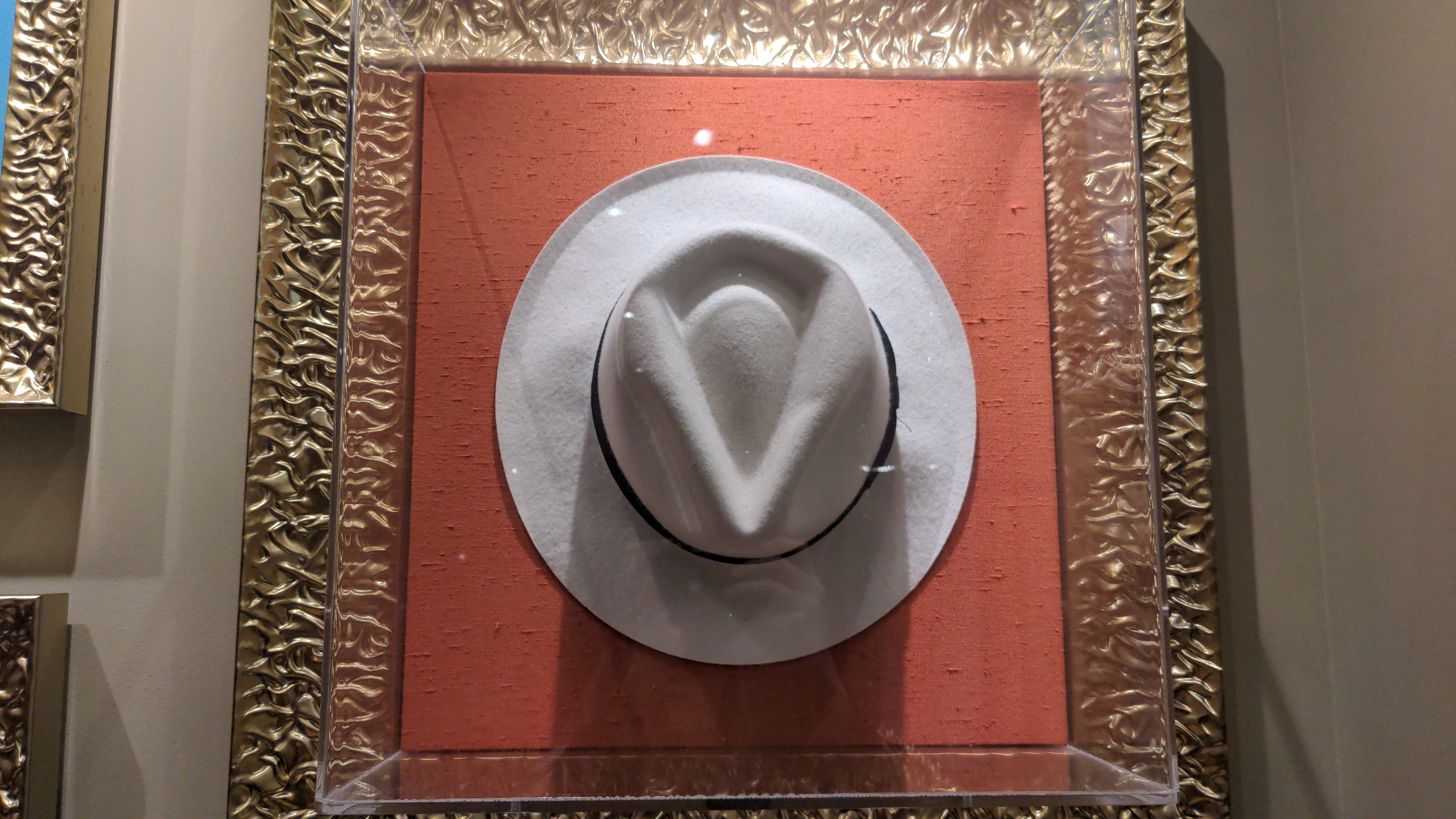
A fedora worn by Jackson while performing "Smooth Criminal", displayed at Hard Rock Cafe, Nice

== Critical reception ==
Jason Elias of AllMusic wrote that "Smooth Criminal" was "a gorgeous and exhilarating record ... [it] presents Michael Jackson at his most captivating and it never fails to impress". Rolling Stone named it the sixth best Jackson song, writing that it was "his best blend of R&B groove and rock edginess, and a turning point in his shift toward darker, harder-edged material." In a retrospective review of Bad, Newsweek wrote: "[Smooth Criminal] is a sleek, exhilarating action sequence of a song that's unlike anything else in Jackson's catalog ... an urgent and inspired highlight. Bad is at its best when it explores the darker, more paranoid side that began to consume Jackson's life in the late '80s, and this song captures that impulse." Entertainment Weekly wrote: "If there was one song on Bad that truly captured the sense of artistic freedom that Jackson felt after Thriller, it was this track ... This is pop music as suspense drama."

== Track listings ==
- 7-inch single
1. "Smooth Criminal" (single mix) – 4:10
2. "Smooth Criminal" (instrumental) – 4:10
- 12-inch maxi and CD-maxi
1. "Smooth Criminal" (extended dance mix) – 7:46
2. "Smooth Criminal" (extended dance mix radio edit) – 5:20
3. "Smooth Criminal" ("Annie" mix) – 5:35
4. "Smooth Criminal" (dance mix – dub version) – 4:45
5. "Smooth Criminal" (a cappella) – 4:12
- Visionary single

CD side:

1. "Smooth Criminal" – 4:10
2. "Smooth Criminal" (extended dance mix) – 7:45

DVD side:

1. "Smooth Criminal" (music video (Shortened Version)) – 4:11
- Cassette single
1. "Smooth Criminal"
2. "Smooth Criminal" (instrumental)
- 3-inch CD single
1. "Smooth Criminal" (extended dance mix) – 7:46
2. "Smooth Criminal" ("Annie" mix) – 5:35
3. "Smooth Criminal" (dance mix – dub version) – 4:45
- Japanese 3-inch CD single
1. "Smooth Criminal"
2. "Smooth Criminal" (instrumental)

== Personnel ==
Adapted from single liner notes and Michael Jackson's website.

- Michael Jackson – vocals
- Bill Bottrell – drum machine
- Bruce Swedien – police announcement
- David Williams – electric guitar
- Kim Hutchcroft – saxophone
- Larry Williams – saxophone
- Gary Grant – trumpet
- Jerry Hey – trumpet and horn arrangement
- Kevin Maloney – muted piano
- Christopher Currell – Synclavier
- Denny Jaeger – Synclavier
- Michael Rubini – Synclavier
- John Barnes – synthesizer
- Michael Boddicker – synthesizer
- Dr. Eric Chevlen – heartbeat recording

== Charts ==
=== Weekly charts ===
Weekly chart performance
Chart (1988–1989)	Peak position
Australia (ARIA)	29
Austria (Ö3 Austria Top 40)	17
Belgium (Ultratop 50 Flanders)	1
Denmark (IFPI)	5
Europe (Eurochart Hot 100)	5
Finland (Suomen virallinen singlelista)	1
France (SNEP)	4
Iceland (Íslenski Listinn Topp 10)	1
Ireland (IRMA)	4
Italy (Musica e dischi)	10
Netherlands (Dutch Top 40)	1
Netherlands (Single Top 100)	1
New Zealand (Recorded Music NZ)	29
Spain (AFYVE)	1
Switzerland (Schweizer Hitparade)	5
UK Singles (OCC)	8
US Billboard Hot 100	7
US Hot Dance Club Play (Billboard)	10
US Hot Dance Music/Maxi-Singles Sales (Billboard)	13
US Hot R&B/Hip-Hop Singles (Billboard)	2
US CHR/Pop (Radio & Records)	8
US Urban Contemporary (Radio & Records)	1
West Germany (GfK)	9

Weekly chart performance
Chart (2006)	Peak position
France (SNEP)	61
Ireland (IRMA)	14
Italy (FIMI)	6
Netherlands (Single Top 100)	20
Spain (Promusicae)	1
UK Singles (OCC)	19
UK Hip Hop/R&B (Official Charts)	3

Weekly chart performance
Chart (2009)	Peak position
Australia (ARIA)	16
Austria (Ö3 Austria Top 40)	30
Canada (Hot Canadian Digital Singles)	22
Denmark (Tracklisten)	28
Europe (Eurochart Hot 100 Singles)	20
France (SNEP) Download Chart	10
Italy (FIMI)	17
Netherlands (Single Top 100)	22
New Zealand (Recorded Music NZ)	37
Spain (Promusicae)	33
Sweden (Sverigetopplistan)	12
Switzerland (Schweizer Hitparade)	12
UK Singles (OCC)	13
US Hot Digital Songs (Billboard)	12

Weekly chart performance
Chart (2024)	Peak position
Kazakhstan Airplay (TopHit)	79

Weekly chart performance
Chart (2026)	Peak position
Austria (Ö3 Austria Top 40)	54
Croatia International Airplay (Top lista)	87
France (SNEP)	39
Germany (GfK)	48
Global 200 (Billboard)	25
Greece International (IFPI)	37
Italy (FIMI)	61
Netherlands (Single Top 100)	59
Norway (VG-lista)	79
Panama Streaming (PRODUCE)	89
Poland (Polish Airplay Top 100)	67
Portugal (AFP)	65
Russia Streaming (TopHit)	94
Spain (Promusicae)	61
Sweden (Sverigetopplistan)	67
United Arab Emirates (IFPI)	18

=== Monthly charts ===
Monthly chart performance
Chart (2024–2026)	Peak position
Kazakhstan Airplay (TopHit)	97
Panama Streaming (PRODUCE)	100

=== Year-end charts ===
Chart (1988)	Position
Belgium (Ultratop 50 Flanders)	73
Netherlands (Dutch Top 40)	50
Netherlands (Single Top 100)	43
UK Singles (OCC)	79

Chart (1989)	Position
Belgium (Ultratop 50 Flanders)	70
US Billboard Hot 100	93
US Hot Black Singles (Billboard)	58
West Germany (Media Control)	57

== Certifications ==
Region	Certification	Certified units/sales
Denmark (IFPI Danmark)	Platinum	90,000^{‡}
France (SNEP)	Silver	200,000^{*}
Germany (BVMI)	Gold	250,000^{‡}
Italy (FIMI)	Gold	25,000^{‡}
Japan (RIAJ) Full-length ringtone	Gold	100,000^{*}
Mexico (AMPROFON)	Diamond+3× Platinum	480,000^{‡}
New Zealand (RMNZ)	3× Platinum	90,000^{‡}
Spain (Promusicae) Visionary version	Platinum	60,000^{‡}
United Kingdom (BPI) Digital Sales	2× Platinum	1,200,000^{‡}
United States (RIAA)	2× Platinum	2,000,000^{‡}
Streaming
Greece (IFPI Greece)	Platinum	2,000,000^{†}
Summaries
Worldwide	—	7,500,000
^{*} Sales figures based on certification alone.^{‡} Sales+streaming figures based on certification alone.

== Alien Ant Farm version ==
"Smooth Criminal"

Single by Alien Ant Farm

from the album Anthology
- B-side: "Orange Appeal"; "Denigrate"
- Released: May 22, 2001
- Genre: Nu metal; alternative metal; hard rock; pop-punk
- Length: 3:29
- Label: DreamWorks
- Songwriter: Michael Jackson
- Producer: Jay Baumgardner

Alien Ant Farm singles chronology
"Movies" (2001)	"Smooth Criminal" (2001)	"Movies" (re-release) (2001)

Music video
- "Alien Ant Farm - Smooth Criminal (Official Music Video)" on YouTube

In May 2001, the American rock band Alien Ant Farm released a "funky metallic" cover of "Smooth Criminal" as the second single from their second studio album, Anthology (2001). According to the lead singer, Dryden Mitchell, the band would play a few riffs of the song while warming up before gigs and audience members would request the entire song.

The cover reached number one on the US Billboard Modern Rock Tracks chart and also reached number one in Australia for eight weeks. In Europe, it reached number three in the UK and charted within the top 10 in 11 other countries. Alien Ant Farm's 1999 album Greatest Hits includes a hidden track, "Slick Thief", which is an early version of "Smooth Criminal".

Mitchell said he came to resent how popular the cover was, and did not want to perform it, thinking: "We're a better band than just this song." However, he accepted that fans wanted to hear it and decided he was being immature. He described it as a "fun party song" like the Beastie Boys' "Fight for Your Right".

=== Music video ===
The music video was directed by Marc Klasfeld and shot in San Fernando, California. It features the band performing in a wrestling ring and in front of a suburban house. The video also references various Michael Jackson music videos and elements of his personal life, including the original "Smooth Criminal" video, the Moonwalk, and Jackson's pet chimpanzee Bubbles.

Before its release, Alien Ant Farm sent the video to Jackson for his approval. At his request, they reshot some scenes to remove a child wearing a surgical mask, a reference to how Jackson wore them in public to allegedly cover cosmetic surgeries. However, Jackson decided he preferred the video with the mask. Reflecting on the video in 2022, Mitchell said, "We went through quite a bit of money and bullshit to make sure that we were appeasing Michael Jackson."

=== Track listings ===
UK CD single

1. "Smooth Criminal"
2. "Orange Appeal"
3. "Denigrate"
4. "Smooth Criminal" (CD-ROM video)

UK cassette single

1. "Smooth Criminal"
2. "Denigrate"

European CD single

1. "Smooth Criminal" (album version)
2. "Orange Appeal"

European maxi-CD single

1. "Smooth Criminal" (album version)
2. "Movies"
3. "Denigrate" (non-LP version)
4. "Smooth Criminal" (video)

Australian CD single

1. "Smooth Criminal" (album version)
2. "Orange Appeal"
3. "Denigrate" (non-LP version)
4. "Smooth Criminal" (video)

=== Charts ===
==== Weekly charts ====
Chart (2001)	Peak position
Australia (ARIA)	1
Austria (Ö3 Austria Top 40)	6
Belgium (Ultratop 50 Flanders)	3
Belgium (Ultratop 50 Wallonia)	4
Canada (BDS)	15
Denmark (Tracklisten)	3
Europe (Eurochart Hot 100)	6
Finland (Suomen virallinen lista)	2
France (SNEP)	27
Germany (GfK)	5
Ireland (IRMA)	2
Italy (FIMI)	11
Netherlands (Dutch Top 40)	4
Netherlands (Single Top 100)	4
New Zealand (Recorded Music NZ)	4
Norway (VG-lista)	7
Scottish Singles Sales (Official Charts)	3
Sweden (Sverigetopplistan)	5
Switzerland (Schweizer Hitparade)	4
UK Singles (Official Charts)	3
UK Rock & Metal (Official Charts)	1
US Billboard Hot 100	23
US Alternative Airplay (Billboard)	1
US Mainstream Rock Airplay (Billboard)	18
US Pop Airplay (Billboard)	12

==== Year-end charts ====
Chart (2001)	Position
Australia (ARIA)	8
Austria (Ö3 Austria Top 40)	61
Belgium (Ultratop 50 Flanders)	24
Belgium (Ultratop 50 Wallonia)	55
Canada Radio (Nielsen BDS)	90
Europe (Eurochart Hot 100)	31
Germany (Media Control)	43
Ireland (IRMA)	17
Netherlands (Dutch Top 40)	40
Netherlands (Single Top 100)	42
Sweden (Hitlistan)	48
Switzerland (Schweizer Hitparade)	39
UK Singles (OCC)	32
US Mainstream Top 40 (Billboard)	78
US Modern Rock Tracks (Billboard)	8

Chart (2002)	Position
Australia (ARIA)	60
Canada (Nielsen SoundScan)	143

==== Decade-end charts ====
Chart (2000–2009)	Position
Australia (ARIA)	48

=== Certifications ===
Region	Certification	Certified units/sales
Australia (ARIA)	2× Platinum	140,000^{^}
Belgium (BRMA)	Gold	25,000^{*}
Germany (BVMI)	Gold	250,000^{‡}
New Zealand (RMNZ)	2× Platinum	60,000^{‡}
Norway (IFPI Norway)	Gold	
Sweden (GLF)	Gold	15,000^{^}
Switzerland (IFPI Switzerland)	Gold	20,000^{^}
United Kingdom (BPI)	2× Platinum	1,200,000^{‡}
^{*} Sales figures based on certification alone.^{^} Shipments figures based on certification alone.^{‡} Sales+streaming figures based on certification alone.

=== Release history ===
Region	Date	Format(s)	Label(s)	Ref.
United States	May 22, 2001	Alternative radio	DreamWorks	
Europe	August 20, 2001	CD; cassette	DreamWorks	
United States	August 21, 2001	Contemporary hit radio	DreamWorks	
United Kingdom	September 17, 2001	CD; cassette	DreamWorks	
Australia	October 15, 2001	CD	DreamWorks	

== Other covers ==
Croatian duo 2Cellos performed the song in a viral YouTube video. Jean Rodríguez sang lead vocals for Tony Succar's Latin-flavored version of "Smooth Criminal", from the album Unity: The Latin Tribute to Michael Jackson (2015), including a section in Spanish. A video of their 2016 performance at the offices of SiriusXM went viral.
