= These Days (Alien Ant Farm song) =

Single by Alien Ant Farm

from the album Truant
- Released: July 1, 2003
- Studio: Conway (Hollywood, California)
- Genre: Nu metal
- Length: 3:06
- Label: DreamWorks
- Songwriters: Tye Zamora, Dryden Mitchell, Mike Cosgrove, Terry Corso
- Producers: Dean DeLeo, Robert DeLeo

Alien Ant Farm singles chronology
"Attitude" (2002)	"These Days" (2003)	"Glow" (2003)

Music video
- "These Days" on YouTube

"These Days" is the first single by Alien Ant Farm from the band's third album, Truant. Originally released on their 1999 album Greatest Hits, the song was reworked and re-recorded for Truant. "These Days" was released to radio on July 1, 2003.

== Music video ==
The music video for "These Days" was filmed and performed on the rooftop of the Hollywood Masonic Temple, across the street from the Kodak Theatre, in Los Angeles. The surprise performance was shot during the 2003 BET Awards while numerous hip hop artists and rappers arrived on the red carpet before the awards show. The video catches the reaction from many artists, including Pharrell, Nelly, Snoop Dogg, Killer Mike, and Lil' Kim among others. The band was arrested at the site and later dismissed by local authorities. The director of the video is Marc Klasfeld.

Another video was shot where the band made surprise performances outside of Staples Center before a performance of the Justified and Stripped Tour - co-headlined by Justin Timberlake and Christina Aguilera - and crashed the West Hollywood Gay Pride Parade in their own ant-themed float, as well as using clips from their BET Awards guerilla performance.

== Credits and personnel ==
- Dryden Mitchell — lead and backing vocals
- Terry Corso — electric guitar, slide guitar
- Tye Zamora — backing vocals, bass
- Mike Cosgrove — drums
- Lenny Castro — percussion

== Charts ==
Chart (2003)	Peak position
US Mainstream Rock (Billboard)	38
US Alternative Airplay (Billboard)	29
US Active Rock (Billboard)	36
US Heritage Rock (Billboard)	40
