= Unity Performing Arts Foundation =

- Formation: 2000
- Founder: Marshall White
- Founded at: Fort Wayne, Indiana, United States
- Type: Non-profit
- Headquarters: Fort Wayne, Indiana, United States
- Website: www.upaf.com

Unity Performing Arts Foundation (abbreviated UPAF; also stylized as UNITY) is an American performing arts non-profit organization based in Fort Wayne, Indiana. The company focuses on diverse types of fine arts, including theatre arts, choral music, instrumental music, literary arts, oration, and others.

== History ==
Founded in 1993 by Marshall White, Unity Performing Arts Foundation was officially incorporated in 2000. Eventually, Unity came to serve as a platform for the Voices of Unity Youth Choir (VOU), a choral group directed by Marshall White that has been performing internationally since the 2000s. The group has performed at international competitions such as the World Choir Games. At the World Choir Games, the choir has won 5 gold medals in 2010, 2012, and 2014. As of 2014, the choir consisted of a demographically diverse group of 123 youths.

Youth development is also a major focus of the organization, as Marshall White does not consider the organization to be strictly an arts venue, but also a place for personal development and community engagement.

== See also ==
- Fort Wayne, Indiana#Performing Arts
- Fort Wayne Philharmonic Orchestra
