= Alien Ant Farm =

American rock band

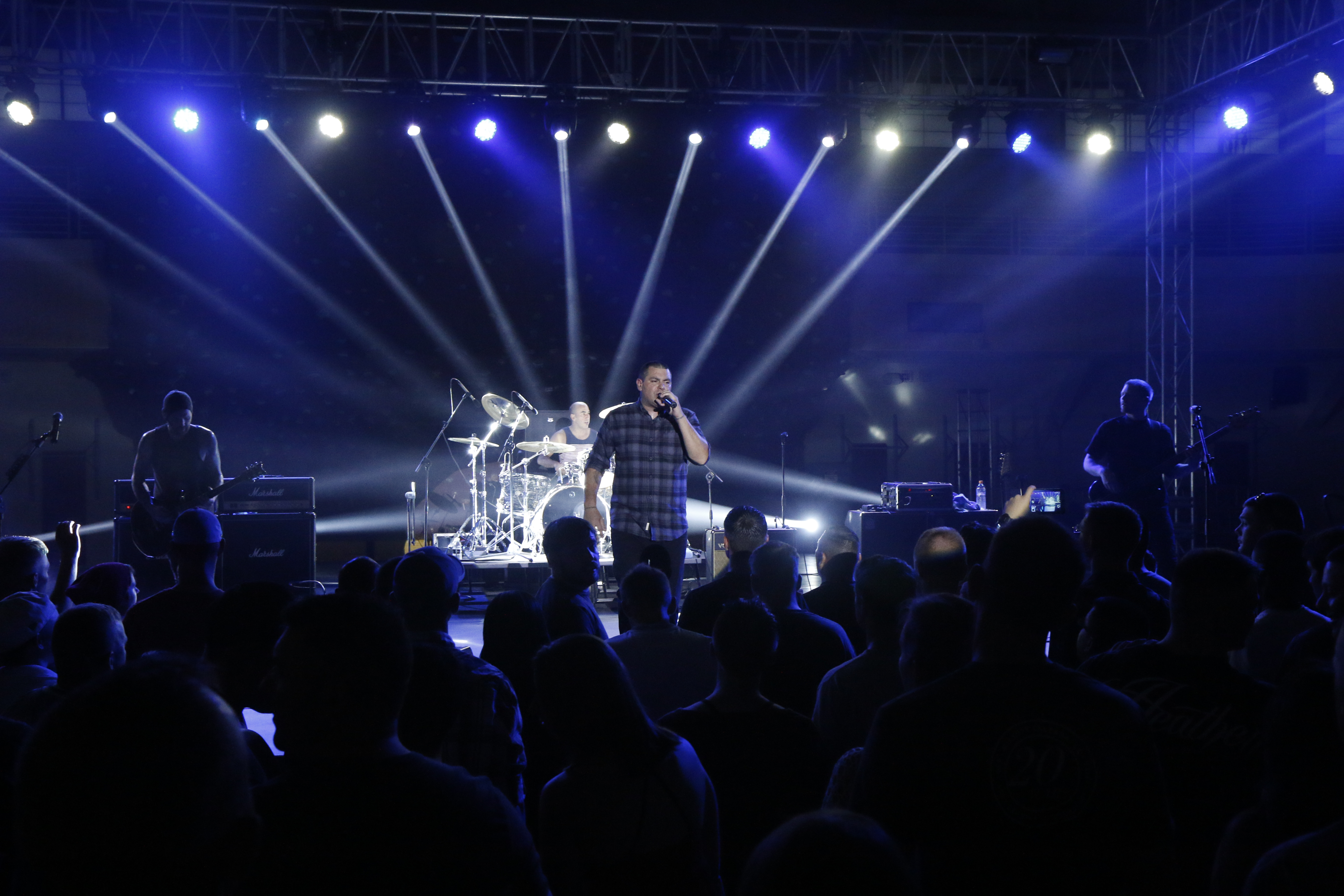
- Alien Ant Farm playing in 2015. From left to right: Terry Corso, Mike Cosgrove, Dryden Mitchell, and Tim Peugh.

Background information
- Origin: Riverside, California, U.S.
- Genres: Alternative rock; nu metal; alternative metal; pop-punk; post-grunge
- Years active: 1996–present
- Labels: DreamWorks; New Door; UM^{e}; El Tonal; Geffen; EMG; The End; ADA; Megaforce; Chick Music; Judge & Jury
- Members: Dryden Mitchell; Terry Corso; Tim Peugh; Mike Cosgrove
- Past members: Tye Zamora; Joe Hill
- Website: alienantfarm.com

Alien Ant Farm is an American rock band that formed in Riverside, California in 1996. They have released six studio albums and sold over 5 million units worldwide. The band's cover of Michael Jackson's "Smooth Criminal" topped the Billboard Alternative songs charts in 2001, and was featured in the film American Pie 2.

They released their debut album Greatest Hits independently in 1999, then signed to DreamWorks Records in 2000. Their second album ANThology was released in 2001 and has been certified platinum by the RIAA, selling over one million copies and reaching number 11 on the Billboard 200. Following up that was their third album, TruANT, released in 2003. The album was produced by brothers Robert and Dean DeLeo of Stone Temple Pilots, and made it to number 42 on the Billboard 200.

In 2005, the band recorded their next album 3rd Draft, however its release was blocked by the label after Geffen bought out DreamWorks. It was eventually released in 2006 as Up in the Attic, charting at number 114 on the Billboard 200. After several years of sporadic touring, the band's fifth studio album Always and Forever was released in February 2015. After nine years, the band released their sixth album Mantras in early 2024.

In 2013, the band was featured in an NME article titled "28 Nu-Metal Era Bands You Probably Forgot All About".

== History ==
=== Early years (1996–2000) ===
The band was formed in 1996 in Riverside, California, the original lineup consisting of Dryden Mitchell (vocals), Terry Corso (guitars), Mike Cosgrove (drums) and Tye Zamora (bass). Their name comes from an idea Corso had about aliens and the Earth: "It was just my daydream about our planet being seeded by entities from other dimensions." Each member was in a prior band before forming (Corso and Cosgrove were in Brother Vibe, Zamora was in a band with brothers Marc and Jon named The Color Red, and Mitchell was in a band named Dragonphlie). Originally, the band considered themselves to be cheating on their other bands, and intended to wear masks while performing.

In 1996 they recorded a demo tape titled the $100 EP containing five songs, and in 1998 they recorded a second demo tape Love Songs, featuring four songs.

In 1999, Alien Ant Farm released their debut album, titled Greatest Hits which featured early versions of songs to be featured on later releases. It went on to win Best Independent Album in the L.A. Music Awards that year.

In 2000, after forging a friendship with the band Papa Roach, Alien Ant Farm signed with DreamWorks SKG for their second studio album, Anthology. They proceeded to tour with Papa Roach to support the album.

=== ANThology (2001–2002) ===
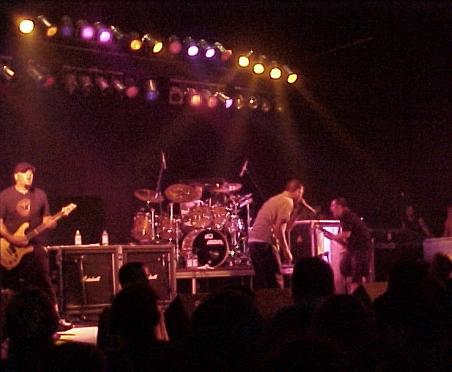
Alien Ant Farm in 2001

In 2001, their cover of Michael Jackson's song, "Smooth Criminal", was a No. 1 single in Australia and No. 4 in New Zealand, a No. 3 single in the UK, and No. 1 on the US Modern Rock charts. The music video features numerous homages to Michael Jackson and his videos. Corso, the band's guitarist, addressed this in an MTV interview on the set of the music video, saying, "We want to pay homage to Michael Jackson, but on our level. Obviously we're not that glitzy, so we just want to tastefully take the stuff that's cool in his videos and apply it in our own dirty little backyard way."

The song appeared on the soundtrack of the first season of WWE Tough Enough and in the film American Pie 2. Their following single "Movies" was a Top 5 hit in the UK and a Top 20 hit in New Zealand. The band began touring in promotion of these two singles and their album, which later went platinum.

In spring of 2002, the band contributed "Bug Bytes" to the first Spider-Man soundtrack.

In May 2002, the band was involved in a bus accident while touring in Spain. While the whole band suffered minor injuries, the driver, 26-year-old Christopher Holland, was killed, and lead singer Mitchell suffered a fractured C2 vertebra.

=== TruANT (2003–2004) ===
Alien Ant Farm soon returned to the studio to work on their next album, Truant, which was released in 2003 and produced by Stone Temple Pilots' Robert and Dean DeLeo. The video for "These Days", the first single from the album, was filmed on top of a nearby building during the Red Carpet at the 2003 BET Awards. "Glow" was a mainstream radio success, achieving long lasting Top 20 success in New Zealand. Two months after this album was released, however, their record label closed its doors. This hindered the album's popularity over time, and the album was much less successful than their platinum-selling debut.

In October 2003, guitarist Corso split with the band citing "irreconcilable differences". Victor Camacho (a long-time friend of the band and guitar player) immediately joined the band and completed the remainder of the Truant tour until the band returned home. Joe Hill was named the new guitarist in 2005 (formerly of Spiderworks).

In 2004, the band recorded the song "Dark in Here" for The Punisher video game. The band was forced to wait for Geffen to allow them to record another album (after Universal Music bought DreamWorks and assigned the band to its Geffen Records label).

=== 3rd Draft and Up in the Attic (2005–2007) ===
In 2005, the band recorded with producer Jim Wirt (who recorded their independent, debut release Greatest Hits) and planned to release the album during that summer. However, Geffen shelved the album and subsequently denied the band the rights to release it themselves. The band hit the road and made bootleg copies of the album material available to all of their fans. This unofficial release was dubbed 3rd Draft by fans.

Four video games have featured the band's songs. Their song "Wish" was in Tony Hawk's Pro Skater 3, while the song "Courage" also featured in Shaun Palmer's Pro Snowboarder and ATV Offroad Fury 2. The song "These Days" was featured in Madden NFL 2004 and the song "S.S Recognize" were featured in NHL 2004.

In late 2005, Geffen finally agreed to let the band release the album on another Universal label, Universal Music Enterprises (its catalog division). On May 30, 2006, the new album, Up in the Attic, was released digitally on iTunes and sold at various retailers. The Best Buy Edition included a bonus track, "Repeat Defender". The first single was "Forgive and Forget", the one added track to 3rd Draft.

In April 2006, bassist Tye Zamora left the band and decided to go to college. The short amount of live shows thereafter featured Alex Barreto on bass. On June 29, 2006, the band performed on G4's Attack of the Show, and on July 18, 2006, Up In The Attic was released worldwide, along with BUSted: The Definitive DVD. Included on the DVD were music videos for "Forgive and Forget", "Around the Block", and "She's Only Evil". Notably, the three videos feature only Dryden Mitchell and Mike Cosgrove.

=== Rejoining of Zamora and Corso (2007–2010) ===
On February 11, 2008, the band posted a statement on their website stating Terry Corso and Tye Zamora had rejoined the band. It was also revealed that the band had "unofficially broken up" in 2007 due to the fact that 2006's Up in the Attic was their least successful album.

Around this time, vocalist Dryden Mitchell formed a new band, Send the Sages. Guitarist Terry Corso and drummer Michael Cosgrove worked on a side project titled Ghost In The Flesh, bassist Tye Zamora worked with the band eEnik. Alien Ant Farm toured sporadically, and released a new live album, Alien Ant Farm: Live In Germany.

In 2009, they played the Sonisphere Festival in Knebworth, UK on August 1. They had also performed "Smooth Criminal" at the 2009 Vans' Warped Tour in memory of Michael Jackson, who had recently died.

On February 9, 2010, Alien Ant Farm posted on their official website that the original line up (Dryden Mitchell, Terry Corso, Tye Zamora and Mike Cosgrove) was back together for the first time since 2003. On February 27, 2010, the Alien Ant Farm official website released the band's first "webizode" titled Bassmasters.

=== Always and Forever and Mantras (2011–present) ===
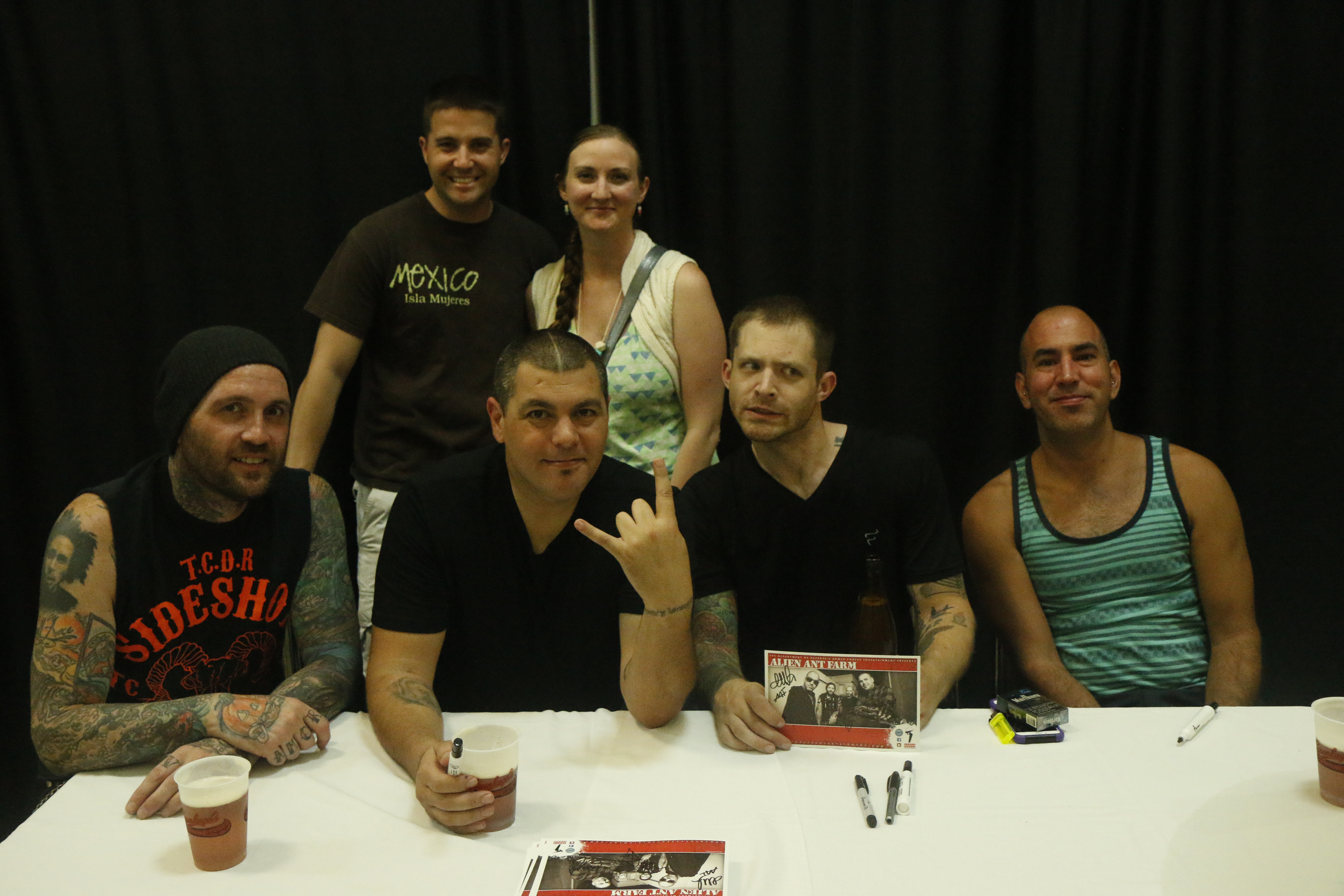
Alien Ant Farm posing with fans in 2015.

The band's "ANTicipation" 2011 Tour took place across the continental U.S. from July to October 2011. They also took part in the "Michael Forever Tribute Concert" which took place on October 8, 2011, in Cardiff, Wales. Alien Ant Farm started writing new material and in July 2012 started recording their fifth album, Always and Forever, at Groovemaster Studios in Chicago in July 2012. In March 2013 they set up a crowdfund, using PledgeMusic, to finance the album's release. The first single from Always and Forever, "Let 'Em Know", was released in May 2013. Also in the summer of 2013, Alien Ant Farm participated in "The Big Night Out Tour", opening for Hoobastank and Fuel.

Zamora left the band for a second time in March 2014 and was replaced by Tim Peugh. At the same time Michael Anaya joined as a touring member of the band, providing backing vocals, percussion, and keyboards. Another single, Homage, was released in September 2014, followed a month later by E.P. Phone Home. The album Always and Forever was released on February 24, 2015.

On March 31, 2016, Alien Ant Farm announced on their official Facebook page that they were writing material for a new album. On May 17, 2016, the band took part in the Make America Rock Again super tour throughout the summer and fall 2016. In addition, they announced a headlining tour where they intend to perform the album Anthology in its entirety.

On October 26, 2016, guitarist Terry Corso assaulted a fan during a show in Chester because he mistakenly believed the fan threw urine at him. Corso pled guilty to assault and was ordered to pay a fine to the victim.

In early 2018, they toured the UK with Soil and Local H, and then embarked on the "Gen-X Tour", alongside Buckcherry, P.O.D., and Lit. On May 8, 2020, they released a cover of the Wham! song "Everything She Wants". Released on February 17, 2021, they collaborated with Insane Clown Posse on the single "Afraid of Life" from the EP Yum Yum's Lure.

On December 30, 2022, Dryden Mitchell was charged with battery after an incident during the Alien Ant Farm concert at Fort Lauderdale's Broward Center for the Performing Arts on October 29. It is alleged that Mitchell grabbed the hand of a male audience member and forced his hand to touch his "genital area".

In 2023, the band played Sick New World and The 23rd Annual Gathering of the Juggalos. Their sixth album, titled Mantras, was released on April 26, 2024. The album's first single, "So Cold", was released on January 19.

In November 2024, Alien Ant Farm kicked CKY off their joint European tour because CKY singer Chad I Ginsburg allegedly punched Dryden Mitchell in the face.

In 2025, the band gained mainstream media attention again when the full soundtrack of Tony Hawk's Pro Skater 3 + 4 was announced leaving the band to write a sad face emoji on the game's soundtrack announcement post on Instagram; over the band not being asked to relicense "Wish" for the games then-upcoming remake. This move was criticized by the band and fans believing "Wish" should have been included with the games soundtrack. In IGN's official review of the game's remake the band's exclusion is cited as "there are bands that weren't even asked, and are as surprised as their fans to be absent from the THPS 3 + 4 soundtrack."

== Musical style and influences ==
Although initially grouped in with the nu metal movement of the late 1990s and early 2000s, the band has since been classified under various other genres, such as alternative rock, alternative metal, post-grunge, punk rock, and pop punk. Spin stated in 2003 that their hit cover of Michael Jackson's "Smooth Criminal" proved that "nu metal could be funny on purpose".

The band's influences include 311, Faith No More, The Beatles, Pink Floyd, The Police, Sade, Kiss, Beastie Boys, The Rolling Stones, Stevie Wonder, Otis Redding, Queen, Steely Dan, Metallica, Black Sabbath, Jeff Buckley, Twisted Sister, Sting, Seal, Weezer, Bad Brains, and Primus.

== Band members ==
Current

- Dryden Vera Mitchell – lead vocals, rhythm guitar (1996–present), lead guitar (2003–2004)
- Michael "Mike" Cosgrove – drums (1996–present)
- Terence "Terry" Corso – lead guitar, backing vocals (1996–2003, 2008–present)
- Tim "Timmy" Peugh – bass, backing vocals (2014–present)

Former

- Joe Hill – lead guitar, backing vocals (2004–2008, 2012 for a one-off show)
- Tye Zamora – bass, keyboards, piano, kalimba, percussion, backing vocals (1996–2006, 2008–2014)

Touring musicians

- Alex Barreto – bass (2006–2008)
- Brian McCaughey- drums (2001–2003)
- Victor Camacho – lead guitar (2003)
- Mike Shawcross – percussion (2003)
- Michael Anaya – keyboards, percussion, backing vocals (2014–present)
- Michael Anthony Grajewski – bass (2022)

Timeline

== Discography ==
- Greatest Hits (1999)
- Anthology (2001)
- Truant (2003)
- Up in the Attic (2006)
- Always and Forever (2015)
- Mantras (2024)
