= Glow (Alien Ant Farm song) =

2003 single by Alien Ant Farm

Single by Alien Ant Farm

from the album truANT
- B-side: "Bug Bytes" (live); "Never Meant" (live)
- Released: September 8, 2003
- Studio: Conway (Hollywood, California)
- Length: 3:17
- Label: DreamWorks
- Songwriter: Alien Ant Farm
- Producers: DeLeo Bros. (Robert DeLeo and Dean DeLeo)

Alien Ant Farm singles chronology
| "These Days" (2003) | "Glow" (2003) | "Forgive & Forget" (2006) |

Music video
- "Glow" on YouTube

"Glow" is a song by American rock band Alien Ant Farm. Written by the band and produced by Robert and Dean DeLeo of Stone Temple Pilots, it was released as the second single from Alien Ant Farm's third studio album, truANT, on September 8, 2003. "Glow" underperformed in both the United States and Australia but became a top-five hit in New Zealand, where it reached number five on the RIANZ Singles Chart and was awarded a gold sales certification.

== Release and reception ==
"Glow" was included as the fourth track on truANT, which was released on August 19, 2003. In the United States, DreamWorks Records serviced "Glow" to modern rock radio on September 8, 2003. Critically, Susanne Ault of Billboard magazine called the track a "bright, bouncy song about physical attraction", but commercially, the song did not appear on any Billboard charts, instead peaking at number 40 on the Alternative Top 50 ranking published by Radio & Records.

In Australia, a CD single of "Glow" was released on June 21, 2004. This CD contains the album version of "Glow", live versions of "Bug Bytes" and "Never Meant", and the song's music video. On June 28, the single debuted and peaked at number 98 on Australia's ARIA Singles Chart before falling out of the top 100 immediately afterwards. The song was more successful in New Zealand, debuting at number 49 on the RIANZ Singles Chart on February 8, 2004. For the next seven weeks, the song rose up the chart, eventually peaking at number five on March 28. The song remained within the top 50 for 16 more weeks (until July 19), totaling 24 weeks on the chart altogether. In August 2022, Recorded Music NZ awarded the song a gold certification for sales and streaming figures exceeding 15,000 units.

== Music video ==
A music video was filmed to promote "Glow". It features the band playing the song in a house while many electronic appliances, such as desk lamps, a refrigerator, a vacuum cleaner, and a PlayStation 2 dance along to the song and interact with the band out of their own accord. At the end of the video, an Atari 2600 knocks a cup of liquid onto the PlayStation 2, causing most of the appliances to short out. The video was added to MTV2's playlists on the week ending September 28, 2003, and was added to Fuse's playlists the following week.

== Credits and personnel ==
Credits are taken from the truANT album booklet.

Studios

- Recorded at Conway Studios (Hollywood, California)
- Mixed at Southern Tracks (Atlanta, Georgia)
- Mastered at Gateway Mastering and DVD (Portland, Maine)

Personnel

- Alien Ant Farm – writing
  - Dryden Vera Mitchell – vocals, background vocals, acoustic guitar
  - Terence Corso – guitar
  - Tye Zamora – background vocals, bass
  - Mike Cosgrove – drums
- Lenny Castro – percussion
- Robert DeLeo – background vocals, production (as DeLeo Bros.)
- Dean DeLeo – production (as DeLeo Bros.)
- Brendan O'Brien – mixing
- Dave Schiffman – engineering
- Andrew Scheps – Pro Tools engineering, assistant engineering
- Bob Ludwig – mastering

== Charts ==
| Chart (2003–2004) | Peak position |
|---|---|
| Australia (ARIA) | 98 |
| New Zealand (Recorded Music NZ) | 5 |
| US Alternative Top 50 (Radio & Records) | 40 |

== Certifications ==
| Region | Certification | Certified units/sales |
|---|---|---|
| New Zealand (RMNZ) | Gold | 15,000^{‡} |
^{‡} Sales+streaming figures based on certification alone.

== Release history ==
| Region | Date | Format(s) | Label(s) | Ref. |
|---|---|---|---|---|
| United States | September 8, 2003 | Modern rock radio | DreamWorks | |
| Australia | June 21, 2004 | CD | DreamWorks | |
