= Executive Music Group =

American record label

Executive Music Group (EMG) is an independent record label located in Dallas, Texas. The label was started in 2004 by Jacob Capricciuolo. EMG represents a wide variety of artists, making them unique among other independent labels. EMG is distributed by Universal Music´s Fontana Distribution. Some of their most well-known artists include or included Dirty Heads, 12 Stones, Alien Ant Farm, Lacey Schwimmer, Khleo Thomas, The Katinas, Niyoki, and Shock of Pleasure.

== Roster ==
- 12 Stones
- Alien Ant Farm
- Big Beam
- Dirty Heads
- The Heroine
- Jamiroquai
- The Katinas
- Niyoki
- Portable Payback
- Lacey Schwimmer
- Shock of Pleasure
- Khleo Thomas (with Executive Dream)
- The Weekend Forecast
