= Up in the Attic =

Studio album by Alien Ant Farm
- Released: May 30, 2006
- Recorded: 2004–2005
- Studios: NRG (North Hollywood, California)
- Genres: Hard rock; pop-punk
- Length: 53:58
- Labels: New Door; UM^{e}; El Tonal
- Producers: Jim Wirt; Jay Baumgardner

Alien Ant Farm chronology
Truant (2003)	Up in the Attic (2006)	Always and Forever (2015)

Singles from Up in the Attic
- 1. "Forgive & Forget" Released: 2006

Professional ratings
Review scores
Source	Rating
AllMusic	3/5 stars
IGN	6.1/10
Melodic	3/5 stars
PopMatters	5/10
Ultimate Guitar	7.7/10

Up in the Attic is the fourth studio album by American rock band Alien Ant Farm, released online on May 30, 2006, and physically on July 17, 2006, via New Door Records.

The album was set to release in 2005 as 3rd Draft, via Geffen Records, however Geffen shelved the album that same year. The band, a year later, distributed it freely in protest, which then convinced Geffen to let them release it under a different Universal subsidiary. An additional track was included on the final album; the radio promo, "Forgive & Forget". This is the only Alien Ant Farm with Joe Hill on guitar, as Terry Corso had left the band in 2003 and returned in 2008.

Up in the Attic debuted at number 114 on the Billboard 200, dropped to number 198 in its next week, and fell off the chart after that. The tracks "She's Only Evil" and "Around the Block" had videos released after the album.

== Track listing ==
All tracks are written by Alien Ant Farm.

No.	Title	Length
1.	"Bad Morning"	3:42
2.	"Forgive & Forget"	2:59
3.	"What I Feel Is Mine"	2:58
4.	"It Could Happen"	3:53
5.	"Around the Block"	3:16
6.	"San Sebastian"	3:05
7.	"Lord Knows"	3:06
8.	"Getting Closer"	3:48
9.	"Crickets"	4:36
10.	"Supreme Lifestyle"	3:56
11.	"Consti2tion"	3:38
12.	"State of Emergency"	3:29
13.	"Sleepwalker"	3:06
14.	"She's Only Evil"	8:26
Total length:		53:57

Notes

- There are two hidden tracks appended to the last song: "Beehive" and "Album End", which were known as "Tragedy" and "Say Something", respectively, on 3rd Draft.

Best Buy exclusive
No.	Title	Length
15.	"Repeat Defender"	3:15

Target exclusive
No.	Title	Length
15.	"Smooth Criminal (Live in Denver)"	3:38
16.	"Bad Morning (Acoustic)"	3:33
17.	"Sleepwalker (Acoustic)"	3:05

== Personnel ==
Alien Ant Farm

- Dryden Mitchell – lead vocals, background vocals, jaw harp
- Joe Hill – guitar, mandolin
- Tye Zamora – bass, background vocals, additional guitars, Hammond B3, piano, theremin
- Mike Cosgrove – drums, percussion, piano

Additional musicians

- Martin Grebb – saxophone (7)
- Nick Lane – trombone (7)
- Steve Madaio – trumpet (7)
- Patrick Warren – string arrangement (13), Chamberlin and keyboards (8, 10, 14)
- Joel Derouin – violin (13)
- Charlie Bisharat – violin (13)
- Matthew Funes – violin (13)
- Larry Corbett – cello (13)

Technical personnel

- Jim Wirt – producer and engineer (1, 3–14)
- C.J. Eiriksson – Pro Tools editing and engineering (1, 3–14)
- Phil Kaffel – basic tracks engineer (1, 3–14)
- Dave Colvin – assistant engineer and additional engineering (1, 3–14)
- Jay Baumgardner – producer (2), mixing
- Dan Certa – Pro Tools editing and engineering (2)
- Sergio Chavez – Pro Tools editing and engineering (2), mixing assistant
- Mike Sliff – additional engineering (2)
- Wade Norton – technical support (2)
- Ted Jensen – mastering

== Charts ==
Chart (2006)	Peak position
US Billboard 200	114
