= Truant (album) =

TruANT

Studio album by Alien Ant Farm
- Released: August 19, 2003
- Recorded: February – April 2003
- Studios: Conway (Hollywood, California)
- Genres: Alternative metal; pop-punk; nu metal; post-grunge
- Length: 40:43
- Labels: DreamWorks; El Tonal
- Producers: Dean DeLeo, Robert DeLeo

Alien Ant Farm chronology
Anthology (2001)	TruANT (2003)	Up in the Attic (2006)

Singles from Truant
- 1. "These Days" Released: July 31, 2003; 2. "Glow" Released: September 9, 2003

Truant (styled as truANT) is the third studio album by American rock band Alien Ant Farm. It was released on August 19, 2003, by DreamWorks Records. The producers of the album were Stone Temple Pilots' bassist and guitarist Robert DeLeo and Dean DeLeo. "These Days" was released to radio on July 1, 2003. "Glow" was released to radio on September 9, 2003.

The music video for track "These Days" was filmed on a rooftop across the street from the Kodak Theatre in Los Angeles. The surprise video shoot was shot during the 2003 BET Awards while numerous hip hop artists and rappers were arriving on the red carpet before the awards show. The video catches the reaction from many artists, including Nelly, Snoop Dogg, and Lil' Kim.

The album art is based on the classic Pee Chee brand school folder, featuring the faces of the band members.

== Background and music ==
On May 22, 2002, while on a European tour supporting their DreamWorks debut Anthology, Alien Ant Farm's tour bus collided with a truck on a highway in the Spanish town of Navalmoral de la Mata. The crash killed Welsh bus driver Christopher Holland and injured all four band members: lead singer Dryden Mitchell suffered a spinal cord injury; guitarist Terry Corso broke his ankle; bassist Tye Zamora sustained a right foot injury; and drummer Mike Cosgrove suffered cuts and bruises along with back and neck pain. The incident forced the cancellation of tour dates and a lengthy recovery period, but it ultimately fueled the introspective and resilient tone of their follow-up album.

The album features a more diverse range of styles than Anthology, with alternative metal, pop-punk, nu metal and post-grunge being the most prevalent. Truant also incorporates sounds such as Spanish salsa (on the track "Tia Lupé"), jazz (on the track "Never Meant"), ska (on the track "1000 Days") and reggae (on the track "Glow"), as well as acoustic, Caribbean, classical, hip-hop and Latin. The track "S.S. Recognize" was a re-recording of an early demo from the 1990s, being described as rap metal by Spin, and a "crackling rap-rocker" by Edna Gundersen of USA Today. She also noted that the track "Sarah Wynn" was about addiction, while "Never Meant" has been described as being about an ex-girlfriend. The Ledger considered "Tia Lupé" to be "an alt-metal Latin combination that works," while the closing track, "Hope", has been labeled an "acoustic quasi-ballad." It holds special significance for Mitchell, since it was the song he was playing when the bus accident occurred. In addition to its acoustic influence is a string arrangement, led by Suzie Katayama. She also led the Japanese-style orchestra on Incubus's song "Aqueous Transmission", the closing track from their 2001 album Morning View. Blender considered "Hope" to musically be aiming for "'Billie Jean'–style pop paranoia".

Upon release, several reviewers compared the album's sound to Faith No More, with the track "Rubber Mallet" having the line "indecision breaks my vision", which was believed to be a reference to a line from Faith No More's song "Falling to Pieces". During the January 2003 Big Day Out Festival in Australia, a local interviewer asked Faith No More's singer Mike Patton whether he was a fan of Alien Ant Farm, but Patton was dismissive of the band.

== Reception ==
Professional ratings
Aggregate scores
Source	Rating
Metacritic	63/100
Review scores
Source	Rating
AllMusic	4.5/5 stars
Blender	2/5 stars
Drowned in Sound	5/10
Entertainment Weekly	B+
IGN	9.5/10
Q	3.5/5 stars
Rolling Stone	3/5 stars
Spin	2.5/5 stars
USA Today	3/4 stars
Dotmusic	8/10

Truant was met with generally favourable reviews from music critics. At Metacritic, the album received an average score of 63, based on ten reviews.

Christina Fuoco of AllMusic awarded it four and a half out of five stars, while Dave Doray of IGN gave it a 9.5 out of 10. Doray compared the vocals to Incubus and noted that "the lighter songs on the album are equally as powerful as the heavier ones." Spin's Sean Richardson had a more mixed review in August 2003, giving it a 2.5 out of 5 rating. He wrote that the band "use pop metal as a springboard for some eclectic experimentation", adding that "the album feels unfocused, and this time, Alien Ant Farm don’t have a novelty hit up their sleeve. Maybe another Jacko tribute is in order; given TruANT‘s slightly dated feel, how about 'Remember the Time'?". Alternative Press had another mixed review, commenting that it "sounds like a teenage Faith No More at their first practice." BBC reviewer Kate Lawrence similarly claimed in 2003 that "much of the album" was reminiscent of Faith No More, writing "given that Faith No More also erred on the irreverent side of rock, it seems fitting that they should be considered influences for AAF. Mitchell and co. once admitted that they basically 'like to have a good time and be goofy'." She added that "[their] cheeky charm is still very much in evidence in what is a very consistent album."

The Chicago Tribune had a mixed review in August 2003. They wrote, "on Alien Ant Farm’s truANT, the group's follow-up to its 2001 smash debut Anthology, the proto-alt-metal-lite sound gets the occasional spell with swatches of salsa ('Tia Lupe'), The Police ('Never Meant') and Faith No More (the vocal hook in 'Rubber Mallet' is lifted straight from 'Falling to Pieces')", adding that "[it's] nice to see Alien Ant Farm branching out, only it’s too bad none of it’s all that riveting." Drowned in Sound gave it a 5 out of 10 rating on August 31, 2003, saying, "Alien Ant Farm are, for all their sins, not a nu-metal band. They're something altogether different and possibly loads worse", adding that the album is "just painfully American radio rock." Blender's Greg Kot noted the album's wide variety of lighter styles, writing on August 19, 2003, that "[Alien Ant Farm] owe their record deal to Papa Roach, but these four Southern Californians have more in common with Sugar Ray: they're pop scavengers not averse to trying anything once." It received a positive B+ rating from Jim Greer of Entertainment Weekly, who wrote that "the album blends influences as disparate as Gang of Four, Rush, and the Police."

=== Commercial response ===
"These Days" appeared on several Billboard component charts: number 17 on Active rock, number 29 on Alternative Airplay, number 38 on Mainstream Rock Songs, and number 40 on Heritage Rock.

== Release ==
The album's rights are currently with Universal Music Group, as three months after Truant's release, they reached a $100 million agreement to acquire DreamWorks Records from DreamWorks Pictures. In December 2005, it was announced that DreamWorks Pictures itself would be sold for $1.6 billion to Viacom (the parent company of Paramount Pictures). Universal Music Group shut down DreamWorks Records in January 2005, and reassigned the label's more profitable artists to different labels within UMG. Alien Ant Farm were among the artists assigned to another label at UMG, as they were one of DreamWorks' highest selling artists, alongside Nelly Furtado and Papa Roach.

In January 2025, Universal Music and Music on Vinyl issued Truant on vinyl for the first time.

== Track listing ==
All tracks are written by Alien Ant Farm.

No.	Title	Length
1.	"1000 Days"	3:07
2.	"Drifting Apart"	2:54
3.	"Quiet"	3:01
4.	"Glow"	3:17
5.	"These Days" (new version; originally recorded for Greatest Hits)	3:06
6.	"Sarah Wynn"	3:24
7.	"Never Meant"	3:06
8.	"Goodbye"	4:06
9.	"Tia Lupé"	4:01
10.	"Rubber Mallet"	3:09
11.	"S.S. Recognize" (new version; originally recorded for $100 EP)	3:51
12.	"Hope"	3:40
Total length:		40:43

UK version bonus track
No.	Title	Length
13.	"Words"	2:42

== Personnel ==
Alien Ant Farm

- Dryden Vera Mitchell – lead and background vocals, acoustic guitar (4)
- Terence Corso – guitar, slide guitar (2, 5, 8), background vocals (9)
- Tye Zamora – bass, acoustic piano (7), kalimba (7), background vocals (1, 4, 5, 11, 12)
- Mike Cosgrove – drums

Technical personnel

- DeLeo Brothers (Robert and Dean) – producers
- Brendan O'Brien – mixing
- Dave Schiffman – engineer
- Andrew Scheps – Pro Tools engineer, additional engineering
- Seth Waldman – assistant engineer
- Bob Ludwig – mastering
- Steve Rosenblatt – production coordination
- Tamara Linder – art direction, design

Additional musicians

- David Campbell – string arranger (12)
- Suzie Katayama – contractor, leader, and cello (12)
- Joel Derouin – violin (12)
- Peter Kent – violin (12)
- John Wittenberg – violin (12)
- Eve Butler – violin (12)
- Norm Hughes – violin (12)
- Darius Campo – violin (12)
- Mark Robertson – violin (12)
- Larry Corbett – cello (12)
- Dan Smith – cello (12)
- Andrew Scheps – trumpet (7, 9)
- Lenny Castro – percussion (1–4, 6, 7, 9, 12)
- Otmaro Ruiz – acoustic piano (9)
- Robert DeLeo – organ (7), background vocals (4, 9)
- Jair Neciosup – background vocals (9)

== Charts ==
Chart performance for Truant
Chart (2003–04)	Peak position
New Zealand Albums (RMNZ)	26
Swiss Albums (Schweizer Hitparade)	71
Scottish Albums (OCC)	64
UK Albums (OCC)	68
UK Rock & Metal Albums (OCC)	10
US Billboard 200	42
