= LA Music Awards =

American music award

The LA Music Awards was a fee-based awards program beginning in 1990 in the city of Los Angeles, California intended to celebrate new artists from around the world. In 2015 the Awards held their 25th anniversary with a program located at the Avalon Theater in Los Angeles. The international online competition allowed fans to vote their favorite musical artist to the top of his/ her category.

The program, which also included the Hollywood F.A.M.E. Awards (film, art, music, and entertainment), was eventually relocated to the City of Las Vegas, Nevada. The show's producer, Al Bowman, was also the show's founder.

As of 2016 the competition proceeded thus: artists in the categories of Pop, Rock, and Country entered their application online by creating an artist page and paid an application fee. Fans then voted for their favorites via the website, eventually selecting the top 10 for each of category. Those 30 artists or groups were flown to Los Angeles where they then performed and competed in front of a panel of judges. The top winner in each category purportedly received a recording contract through Rock Star University Records and was flown to the west coast to record a 10-track studio album. Funding for the award was largely provided by those participating in it, with various retainer and marketing fees in 2014 adding up to over $20,000 per participant for those who went on to the final round. Additional funding came from tickets which had to be purchased by contestants and then sold by them to would-be audience members for, in 2014, $175 a piece.

The LA Music Awards website does not show anything past 2014, and the acclaimed winners of the 2016 award are not shown at the Avalon Theater but at the Hard Rock Cafe on Hollywood Boulevard.

In 1992 the Los Angeles Times said of the show that it "has a lack of feeling for the city's musical character and diversity". The show also chooses to highlight many artists who are well known but who never submitted applications and do not attend the show itself.

As of October 2025, the LA Music Awards domain name has been taken over by an Indonesian gambling site called "TotoSlot 4D".
