= This Can't Be Life =

1996 album by Wild Colonials

Studio album by Wild Colonials
- Released: 1996
- Studios: A&M; Capitol; Zeitgeist; House of Blues; Mad Hatter
- Genres: Alternative, folk rock
- Length: 45:07
- Label: DGC
- Producers: Tony Berg, John Porter

Wild Colonials chronology
Fruit of Life (1994)	This Can't Be Life (1996)	Reel Life, Vol. 1 (2000)

This Can't Be Life is the second album by the American band Wild Colonials, released in 1996. The first single was "Charm", which was an alternative radio hit. The band supported the album with a North American tour that included stints with Los Lobos and Chalk FarM. They also headlined the second stage at the inaugural 1997 Lilith Fair.

== Production ==
The album was produced by Tony Berg and John Porter. The album cover used artwork from a lithograph from the 1700s, which was discovered on a postcard. Bandmember Scott Roewe played a penny whistle, melodica, and didgeridoo, among other instruments. Rickie Lee Jones contributed to the album. "Want" is about the death of singer Angela McCluskey's mother. McCluskey had a practice of starting to compose songs during year-end holiday seasons.

== Critical reception ==
Professional ratings
Review scores
Source	Rating
AllMusic	4/5 stars
Los Angeles Times	2.5/4 stars
San Jose Mercury News	2/4 stars

The Philadelphia Inquirer deemed the album a "catchy, Eastern-flavored second effort." The Los Angeles Times wrote that "McCluskey sings messages for the lovelorn and the bitter over sounds that run from jazzy torch epics to the vaguely Middle Eastern." The San Jose Mercury News noted the "same low-range vocal ground" as 10,000 Maniacs. The Arkansas Democrat-Gazette dismissed This Can't Be Life as "fuzzy acoustic vaguely Irish folk jazz."

The Orange County Register advised: "Imagine an Out of Time-era R.E.M. fronted by a raving mad Deborah Harry and you begin to get the idea of the punch Wild Colonials can pack." The Star-Ledger stated that "McCluskey's husky, intelligent, sultry voice is the right vehicle to carry the band's jagged, edgy, Celtic-flavored alternative folk-rock that's as much Roxy Music as it is 10,000 Maniacs."

The Oregonian listed This Can't Be Life among the 10 best albums of 1996.

== Track listing ==
All songs written by Wild Colonials

1. "This Misery" – 4:13
2. "Spirit" – 4:50
3. "Coy" – 3:44
4. "Wake Up Sad" – 5:05
5. "Charm" – 3:17
6. "Want" – 5:14
7. "If" – 4:05
8. "Blue" – 5:36
9. "Different" – 3:54
10. "Childhood" – 5:49

== Personnel ==
- Angela McCluskey – vocals
- Shark – guitars, vocals, percussion, ambient bass
- Paul Cantelon – violin, piano
- Scott Roewe – bass, piano, organ, melodica, wurlitzer, casio, didgeridoo, bass clarinet, penny whistle, tenor sax
- Thaddeus Corea – drums, percussion, vocals

with

- Martin Tillmann – cello
- Jon Brion – chamberlin, guitar, organ on "This Misery"
- Juliet Prater – world percussion
- Tony Berg – optigan, guitar, tambura
- Andrew Scheps – mütes galore on "Wake Up Sad" and "This Misery"
- Rickie Lee Jones – Guest vocals on "Spirit"
- Eric Reigler – uilleann pipes on "Want"
- Ethan James – hurdy-gurdy on "Childhood"
- Robert Burns – vibraphone on "Wake Up Sad"
- Whitney Wade – additional vocals on "If"

Production

- Producers: Tony Berg, John Porter
- Mixers: Tchad Blake, Jim Rondinelli
- Recorded by: Brian Scheuble, Joe McGrath
- Additional engineering: Howard Willing
