= The Spreading Ground =

2000 film

- Directed by: Derek Vanlint
- Written by: Mark Burman; Ross Korte
- Starring: Dennis Hopper
- Cinematography: Derek Vanlint
- Release date: 5 March 2000
- Running time: 100 minutes
- Country: Canada
- Language: English

The Spreading Ground is a 2000 Canadian crime film directed by Derek Vanlint and starring Dennis Hopper. It was entered into the 22nd Moscow International Film Festival. The film's score was composed by Wild Colonials guitarist, Shark.

== Cast ==
- Dennis Hopper as Det. Ed DeLongpre
- Leslie Hope as Leslie DeLongpre
- Frederic Forrest as Det. Michael McGivern
- Tom McCamus as Johnny Gault
- David Dunbar as Milo Spivak
- Elizabeth Shepherd as Mayor Margaret Hackett
- Chuck Shamata as Capt. Paul Nieman
- Kim Huffman as Mrs. Osterman
- Tom Harvey as Paddy Flynn
- Rob Stefaniuk as Syphon
