= Angela McCluskey =

British singer and songwriter (1960–2024)

- Born: 28 February 1960
- Origin: Glasgow, Scotland
- Died: 14 March 2024 (aged 64)
- Genres: Alternative rock; pop rock; electronic
- Occupation: Singer-songwriter
- Instrument: Vocals
- Years active: 1992–2024
- Labels: Manhattan; Geffen
- Formerly of: Wild Colonials; Télépopmusik
- Website: angelamccluskey.com

Angela McCluskey (28 February 1960 – 14 March 2024) was a Scottish singer-songwriter based in California, United States. She performed as a solo artist and as a member of the folk rock group Wild Colonials. McCluskey also provided vocals for Curio and recorded the European dance hit and U.S. Mitsubishi commercial hit, "Breathe", among other songs with Télépopmusik (on the albums Genetic World and Angel Milk). She also sang "Beautiful Things" for American Express and later her voice was heard on the Schick Quattro commercial singing "I'm Not the Girl". Her songs have appeared on the soundtracks for the films Rachel Getting Married (2008), Sherrybaby (2006), and The Beat That My Heart Skipped (2005). Her music has also been featured in the television series Grey's Anatomy.

== Biography ==
Angela McCluskey was born in the Dennistoun area of Glasgow, Scotland, on 28 February 1960. She moved to London and found work as a film publicist, and then in the music video department of EMI Records. In 1993, she relocated to the United States, to Hollywood, California.

McCluskey was married to composer Paul Cantelon, whom she met in about 1992 in London where he was playing piano in a restaurant.

In Los Angeles in 1993, McCluskey, Cantelon and their friend Shark formed the Wild Colonials. Two albums, Fruit of Life (1994) and This Can't Be Life (1996), were followed by performances at 1997's Lilith Fair road show. During this period, McCluskey worked with Dr. John, Cyndi Lauper, Deep Forest, Joe Henry, and The The.

In 1996, McCluskey collaborated with Triptych for the album Curio, an album of cover songs recorded on a Warner Brothers sound stage in Hollywood, California.

In 2001, McCluskey and Télépopmusik collaborated on a song titled "Breathe." The song was a transatlantic hit, entering the US Billboard Hot 100 and peaking in the Top 50 on the UK Singles chart. McCluskey collaborated with the group on several of the songs on their debut album, Genetic World and also lent her vocals to several songs on the group's 2005 follow-up, Angel Milk.

In 2004, McCluskey released her debut solo album The Things We Do on Manhattan Records/ Blue Note. The record was written and recorded in Manhattan and Sweden. It was produced by Shudder to Think's Nathan Larson.

In 2007, Bruce Weber featured McCluskey and her husband, Paul Cantelon, in the short film Wine and Cupcakes, where the couple romps through Central Park while McCluskey does a spoken-word voice-over of the song, "If I Ruled the World" and then sings "Autumn in New York".

In 2009, McCluskey released her second solo album, You Could Start a Fight in an Empty House, including the track "Handle with Grace" (featuring Télépopmusik).

In 2011, McCluskey performed her three-person show Catch a Falling Star in New York while also performing at Carnegie Hall. She also appeared as a featured vocalist on Robbie Robertson's album How to Become Clairvoyant. She also achieved a chart-topping hit that year with "In the Air", her collaboration with Morgan Page, which went to No. 1 on the Billboard Dance Airplay Chart. McCluskey's third solo record, Lambeth Palace, was released in 2012 and featured collaborations with Morgan Page, Ambrosia Parsley, and Richard Fortus. She also sang on "Stargazing", a collaboration with Delerium featured on their album Music Box Opera. The following year, McCluskey released XIX with the duo Christian Rich and also We Are the Future with Andy Caldwell (released on Nettwerk). In 2016, she sang on a song by Big Gigantic titled "Little Things." The group stated that they had heard a song on Pandora by Télépopmusik featuring McCluskey's vocals, which caught their attention.

In November 2023 was asked to perform at a memorial concert for Robbie Robertson by film director Martin Scorsese. Variety magazine commented that 'With her powerhouse vocals filling the room, McCluskey gave an impassioned, goosebump-inducing performance.'

McCluskey died following surgery for an arterial tear, on 14 March 2024, at the age of 64.

== Discography ==
- The Things We Do (Manhattan/Blue Note, 2004)
- Angela McCluskey EP (2004)
- You Could Start a Fight in an Empty House (Bernadette, 2009)
- Handle with Grace EP (Bernadette, 2010)
- Here Comes the Sun (Bernadette, 2011)
- Lambeth Palace (EP) (Believe, 2012)
- The Roxy Sessions (Bernadette, 2016)
- Between Ourselves EP (Bernadette, 2021)
- Penny Thoughts (Bernadette, 2025)

=== with The Garden of Eden ===
- The Garden of Eden (1988)

=== with Wild Colonials ===
- Fruit of Life (1994)
- This Can't Be Life (1996)
- Reel Life vol. 1 (2000)
- Life As We Know It EP 1/4 (2007)

=== with Télépopmusik ===
Genetic World (2001)

- "Breathe"
- "Smile"
- "Love Can Damage Your Health"
- "Yesterday Was a Lie"

Angel Milk (2005)

- "Don't Look Back"
- "Love's Almighty"
- "Brighton Beach"
- "Nothing's Burning"

=== As a featured artist ===
- Deep Forest - "Will You Be Ready ft. Angela McCluskey and Chitose Hajime" on Music Detected (2002)
- Parov Stelar - "Parov Stelar feat. Angela McCluskey - Don't Believe What They Say" on The Demon Diaries (2015)
- Kendrick Lamar - "Is It Love ft. Angela McCluskey" on The Kendrick Lamar EP (2009)
- Morgan Page – Tell Me Why (2010)
- Robbie Robertson – "When the Night Was Young" on How to Become Clairvoyant
- Morgan Page, Sultan & Ned Shepard and BT – In the Air (Nettwerk, 2012)
- Delerium – "Stargazing" on Music Box Opera (Nettwerk, 2012)
- Angela McCluskey & Christian Rich – "XIX" (2012)
- Andy Caldwell – "We Are the Future" (Nettwerk)
- Maor Levi ft. Angela McCluskey - Pick Up The Pieces
- Paul Oakenfold feat. Angela McCluskey - You Could Be Happy
- Azealia Banks - "Ice Princess" (uncredited chorus vocals)
- Christian Rich - "Real Love" FW14 (2015)
- Big Gigantic - "The Little Things" (2 March 2016)
- Sultan + Shepard - "More Than You Ever Know feat. Angela McCluskey" (2021)
