= Angel Milk =

Studio album by Télépopmusik
- Released: June 21, 2005
- Genres: Electronic, trip hop, downtempo
- Length: 66:15
- Label: Capitol

Télépopmusik chronology
Genetic World (2001)	Angel Milk (2005)	Rare Remixes (2018)

Singles from Angel Milk
- 1. "Into Everything" Released: 2005; 2. "Don't Look Back" Released: 2005

Professional ratings
Aggregate scores
Source	Rating
Metacritic	68/100
Review scores
Source	Rating
Allmusic	2/5 stars
Drowned in Sound	6/10 stars
IGN	8/10 stars
MuzObzor	4/5 stars
PopMatters	6/10 stars
Spin	B−

Angel Milk is the second album from French electronic group Télépopmusik, released on June 21, 2005. The album was met with mostly positive reviews from music critics, who praised the record's production and Angela McCluskey's guest vocals. The album spawned two singles, "Into Everything" and "Don't Look Back".

== Background ==
Prior to the recording of Angel Milk, Télépopmusik had achieved some mainstream success with "Breathe". The song was used in a Mitsubishi advertisement, became a top 50 hit in the UK, and entered the Billboard Hot 100. The song's parent album, Genetic World, also proved a success, charting in both the US and the UK.

For their second record, Télépopmusik reunited with Angela McCluskey, who had provided vocals on several of the tracks on the group's debut, including "Breathe". They also enlisted English rapper Mau (of trip hop band Earthling) and English vocalist Deborah Anderson. The final two songs on the record include long gaps of silence, which drew some criticism.

== Release ==
The track "Into Everything", featuring Anderson, was released as the lead single with an accompanying music video just ahead of the release of the album, reaching number 234 on the UK Singles Chart in July 2005. The album, which was released on 21 June 2005 by Capitol Records, experienced a similarly disappointing chart performance. The album's second single, "Don't Look Back", featured lead vocals by McCluskey.

== Critical reception ==
The album garnered generally positive reviews upon its release. On review aggregate site Metacritic, the album holds a score of 68/100, indicating "generally favorable reviews". IGN's W. Fry stated that if he "had to choose one adjective for Télépopmusik's it would be: chill", then went on to criticize the use of silence programmed into the last two tracks, but concluded that "the tracks go down effortlessly, leaving you with a nice taste in your mouth". PopMatters' Justin Cober-Lake singled out Angela McCluskey's vocals as a highlight, commenting that she "steals the show" and noting that the other vocalists, particularly Mau, don't "fare as well". Cober-Lake concluded that "the music’s not flawless, but it serves its role as come-down music quite nicely", and awarded the album 6 stars out of 10.

Some critics were more negative towards the album. AllMusic's David Jeffries awarded the album 2 out of 5 stars, saying that though the album has "beautiful backing tracks", the music was unoriginal. A review by Spin was similarly critical, giving it a "B−" and, though likening it to Moby and Björk, felt that the album was ultimately nondescript. Drowned in Sound's Julian Ridgeway gave the album a 6/10 and, though praising the record's production and stylistic range, concluded that "it’s a record that feels like it’s missing something vital. It might be a bit of heart."

== Track listing ==
1. "Don't Look Back" (featuring Angela McCluskey) – 0:11 + 3:50
2. "Stop Running Away" (featuring Deborah Anderson) – 2:41
3. "Anyway" (featuring Mau) – 2:34
4. "Into Everything" (featuring Deborah Anderson) – 4:25
5. "Love's Almighty" (featuring Angela McCluskey) – 4:28
6. "Last Train To Wherever" (featuring Mau) – 0:23 + 5:02
7. "Brighton Beach" (featuring Angela McCluskey) – 4:23
8. "Close" (featuring Deborah Anderson) – 3:18
9. "Swamp" – 2:05
10. "Nothing's Burning" (featuring Angela McCluskey) – 3:52
11. "Ambushed" – 1:34
12. "Hollywood on My Toothpaste" (featuring Mau) – 5:28
13. "Tuesday" (featuring Mau) – 1:26
14. "Another Day" – 5:35
15. "15 Minutes" (featuring Mau) – 1:05 + 15:38 of silence

=== Notes ===
- On some editions of the album, "Don't Look Back" is preceded by a short hidden track, a voice saying "Who can not play a musical instrument. Who do not care to dance." Rewind from track 1 to play the track.
- The pregap to "Last Train to Wherever" contains a short intro.
- "Another Day" contains audio for 1:36, followed by four minutes of silence.
- The pregap to "15 Minutes" contains the song. The rest of track 12 consists of silence.

=== Japanese edition ===
- There is a different arrangement of "Into Everything".
- Track 15 is called "15 Seconds", rather than "15 Minutes".
- There is a bonus track: "Baboons" – 2:39
