= I Shot a Man in Vegas =

- Directed by: Keoni Waxman
- Written by: Keoni Waxman
- Produced by: Alec Chorches; Adam Gainsburg; Molly M. Mayeux; Scott Moore
- Starring: John Stockwell; Janeane Garofalo
- Cinematography: Steven Finestone
- Edited by: Ken Blackwell
- Music by: Shark
- Production company: Trans Atlantic Entertainment
- Distributed by: Arrow Entertainment
- Release dates: July 1995 (Mystfest); October 18, 1996 (United States)
- Country: United States
- Language: English

I Shot a Man in Vegas is a 1995 American crime thriller film written and directed by Keoni Waxman and starring John Stockwell and Janeane Garofalo. The film follows five friends after one of them guns down another and dumps the corpse into the trunk of a car.

== Plot ==
On a night of youthful carousing in Las Vegas, a scuffle erupts between hustler, Johnny, and his friend Grant in an alley. Watching the fight are Grant's girlfriend, Gale, as well as friends Martin and Amy. The fight ends in a death – and Gale, Martin, and Amy each claim to have seen something different. After dumping the corpse in the trunk of a car, the survivors take off across the Nevada desert toward the California border. Their different perspectives on what occurred are seen through flashback.

== Cast ==
- John Stockwell as Grant
- Janeane Garofalo as Gale
- Brian Drillinger as Martin
- Noelle Lippman as Amy
- David Cubitt as Johnny
- Ele Keats as Chick
- Todd Cole as Nick
- Patrick J. Statham as Cop No. 1
- Ellen S. Statham as Cop No. 2 (as Ellen Statham)
- Tyler Patton as Cop No. 3
- Shark as The All Nighter (voice)
- Wendy Gardner as Lorna Love (voice)
- Craig Wasson as Radio Caller (voice)

== Soundtrack ==
The film's score was composed by Wild Colonials guitarist, Shark.

The score piece "Route 15 4:30AM" from the film appeared on the Wild Colonials film music compilation, Reel Life, Vol. 1.

== Critical reception ==
In his review, film critic Kevin Thomas of the Los Angeles Times praised the film, writing "...this taut psychological drama packs one surprise after another. Storytelling with a camera seems to come naturally for Waxman, who matches an easy visual flair with an equally effective way with actors and dialogue... Waxman has chosen well his cameraman Steven Finestone, endlessly resourceful and dynamic yet fluid, and his composer Shark, whose spare, mood-setting score is superior to many in far more expensive movies."
