= List of accolades received by the Alien film series =

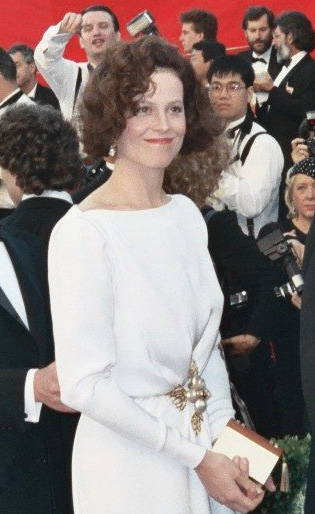
- Sigourney Weaver has been critically lauded for her portrayal of Ellen Ripley in the Alien film series and has been nominated for both Academy and Golden Globe Awards for her performance in Aliens. Her success is considered as a milestone of the recognition to the science fiction and horror genres.
Awards & Nominations
Award	Won	Nominated
Academy Award	3	12
AMSCAP Awards	1	0
Artios Awards	0	1
BAFTA Awards	3	9
Blockbuster Entertainment Awards	1	1
Bogey Awards	1	0
British Society of Cinematographers	0	1
DVD Exclusive Awards	2	4
Fantasporto	0	1
Golden Globe Awards	0	3
Golden Reel Awards	2	3
Golden Trailer Awards	0	2
Grammy Awards	0	1
Hasty Pudding Theatricals	1	0
Hugo Awards	2	1
IGN Movie Awards	1	0
Japanese Academy Awards	0	1
Key Art Awards	2	0
Kinema Junpo Awards	1	0
London Film Critics' Circle Awards	0	1
Los Angeles Film Critics Association Awards	1	0
MTV Movie Awards	0	1
Phoenix Film Critics Society	0	1
San Sebastián International Film Festival Awards	1	0
Satellite/Golden Satellite Awards	0	5
Saturn Awards	13	29
Sierra Awards	2	0
Stinkers Bad Movie Awards	0	4
Teen Choice Awards	0	3
Visual Effects Society	1	3
Young Artist Awards	0	1
- Total number of wins and nominations
Totals	37	78
- Footnotes

Alien is an action/horror film series created by Dan O'Bannon and Ronald Shusett. The series began with the four films Alien (1979), Aliens (1986), Alien 3 (1992), and Alien Resurrection (1997). A prequel series directed by Ridley Scott began with Prometheus (2012) and continued with Alien: Covenant (2017). This was followed by Alien: Romulus (2024), which is set between the first two films and was directed by Fede Álvarez. Set between the 21st and 24th centuries, the plot focuses on humanity's violent encounters with a vicious alien life form, with the lead protagonist being Ellen Ripley, a woman determined to stop the creature and prevent the corrupt Weyland-Yutani Corporation from obtaining it for biological weaponry.

The first two installments in the film series were met with universal praise for the technical attributes, as well as Sigourney Weaver's portrayal of the lead, Ellen Ripley, for which she earned nine nominations and two wins (Saturn Award for Best Actress and Hasty Pudding Woman of the Year Award). Though the subsequent installments were met with generally mixed reviews, all five films in the Alien film series have been critically lauded for their technical attributes, ranging from recognition of the visual and sound effects, to the design of the recurring alien creature. The Alien Quadrilogy and Alien Anthology DVD and Blu-ray Disc collections have both won medium-specific awards.

== Alien ==
Award	Category	Recipients	Result	Ref.
Academy Awards	Best Art Direction	Michael Seymour, Leslie Dilley, Roger Christian, and Ian Whittaker	Nominated	
Academy Awards	Best Visual Effects	H.R. Giger, Carlo Rambaldi, Brian Johnson, Nick Allder and Denys Ayling	Won	
British Academy Film Awards	Anthony Asquith Award for Film Music	Jerry Goldsmith	Nominated	
British Academy Film Awards	Best Costume Design	John Mollo	Nominated	
British Academy Film Awards	Best Editing	Terry Rawlings	Nominated	
British Academy Film Awards	Best Production Design	Michael Seymour	Won	
British Academy Film Awards	Best Supporting Actor	John Hurt	Nominated	
British Academy Film Awards	Best Sound	Derrick Leather, Jim Shields and Bill Rowe	Won	
British Academy Film Awards	Most Promising Newcomer to Leading Film Role	Sigourney Weaver	Nominated	
British Society of Cinematographers	Best Cinematography Award	Derek Vanlint	Nominated	
Golden Globe Awards	Best Original Score	Jerry Goldsmith	Nominated	
Grammy Awards	Best Album of Original Score Written for a Motion Picture or Television Special	Jerry Goldsmith	Nominated	
Hugo Awards	Best Dramatic Presentation	Alien	Won	
San Sebastián International Film Festival	Best Cinematography and Special Effects	Alien	Won	
Saturn Awards	Best Science Fiction Film	Alien	Won	
Saturn Awards	Best Actress	Sigourney Weaver	Nominated	
Saturn Awards	Best Director	Ridley Scott	Won	
Saturn Awards	Best Writing	Dan O'Bannon	Nominated	
Saturn Awards	Best Supporting Actress	Veronica Cartwright	Won	
Saturn Awards	Best Make-up	Pat Hay	Nominated	
Saturn Awards	Best Special Effects	Brian Johnson and Nick Allder	Nominated	

== Aliens ==
Award	Category	Recipients	Result	Ref.
American Society of Composers, Authors and Publishers Awards	Top Box Office Film	James Horner	Won	
Academy Awards	Best Actress	Sigourney Weaver	Nominated	
Academy Awards	Best Art Direction	Peter Lamont and Crispian Sallis	Nominated	
Academy Awards	Best Film Editing	Ray Lovejoy	Nominated	
Academy Awards	Best Original Score	James Horner	Nominated	
Academy Awards	Best Sound	Graham V. Hartstone, Nicolas Le Messurier, Michael A. Carter and Roy Charman	Nominated	
Academy Awards	Best Sound Effects Editing	Don Sharpe	Won	
Academy Awards	Best Visual Effects	Robert Skotak, Stan Winston, John Richardson and Suzanne M. Benson	Won	
British Academy Film Awards	Best Sound	Don Sharpe, Roy Charman and Graham V. Hartstone	Nominated	
British Academy Film Awards	Best Production Design	Peter Lamont	Nominated	
British Academy Film Awards	Best Special Visual Effects	Robert Skotak, Brian Johnson, John Richardson, Suzanne M. Benson and Stan Winston	Won	
British Academy Film Awards	Best Makeup	Peter Robb-King	Nominated	
Artios Awards	Best Casting for Feature Film, Drama	Mike Fenton, Jane Feindberg and Judy Taylor	Nominated	
Golden Globe Awards	Best Actress – Motion Picture Drama	Sigourney Weaver	Nominated	
Golden Reel Awards	Best Sound Editing	Don Sharpe	Won	
Hugo Awards	Best Dramatic Presentation	Aliens	Won	
Japanese Academy Awards	Outstanding Foreign Language Film	Aliens	Nominated	
Kinema Junpo Awards	Readers' Choice Award for Best Foreign Language Film	James Cameron	Won	
Saturn Awards	Best Science Fiction Film	Aliens	Won	
Saturn Awards	Best Actor	Michael Biehn	Nominated	
Saturn Awards	Best Actress	Sigourney Weaver	Won	
Saturn Awards	Best Supporting Actor	Bill Paxton	Won	
Saturn Awards	Best Supporting Actress	Jenette Goldstein	Won	
Saturn Awards	Best Performance by a Younger Actor	Carrie Henn	Won	
Saturn Awards	Best Director	James Cameron	Won	
Saturn Awards	Best Writing	James Cameron	Won	
Saturn Awards	Best Costume	Emma Porteus	Nominated	
Saturn Awards	Best Make-Up	Peter Robb-King	Nominated	
Saturn Awards	Best Special Effects	Stan Winston, Robert Skotak and Dennis Skotak	Won	
Young Artist Awards	Exceptional Performance by a Young Actress, Supporting Role in a Feature Film - Comedy, Fantasy or Drama	Carrie Henn	Nominated	

- AFI's 100 Years... 100 Movie Quotes (2005)
  - "Get away from her, you bitch!" – Nominated.

== Alien 3 ==
Award	Category	Recipients	Result	Ref.
Academy Awards	Best Visual Effects	Richard Edlund, Alec Gillis, Tom Woodruff Jr. and George Gibbs	Nominated	
British Academy Film Awards	Best Special Effects	Richard Edlund, Alec Gillis, Tom Woodruff Jr. and George Gibbs	Nominated	
Fangoria Chainsaw Awards	Best Studio/Big-Budget Film	Alien 3	Nominated	
Fangoria Chainsaw Awards	Best Actress	Sigourney Weaver	Nominated	
Fangoria Chainsaw Awards	Best Supporting Actor	Charles S. Dutton	Nominated	
Hugo Awards	Best Dramatic Presentation	Alien 3	Nominated	
Golden Reel Awards	Best Sound Editing	Alien 3	Won	
MTV Movie Awards	Best Action Sequence	Aliens chase through a tunnel	Nominated	
Saturn Awards	Best Science Fiction Film	Alien 3	Nominated	
Saturn Awards	Best Actress	Sigourney Weaver	Nominated	
Saturn Awards	Best Supporting Actor	Charles S. Dutton	Nominated	
Saturn Awards	Best Director	David Fincher	Nominated	
Saturn Awards	Best Writing	David Giler, Walter Hill and Larry Ferguson	Nominated	
Saturn Awards	Best Costume	Rob Ringwood and David Perry	Nominated	
Saturn Awards	Best Special Effects	Richard Edlund, Alec Gillis, Tom Woodruff Jr. and George Gibbs	Nominated	

== Alien Resurrection ==
Award	Category	Recipients	Result	Ref.
Blockbuster Entertainment Awards	Favorite Actress - Sci-Fi	Sigourney Weaver	Nominated	
Blockbuster Entertainment Awards	Favorite Supporting Actress - Sci-Fi	Winona Ryder	Won	
Bogey Awards	Bogey Award	20th Century Fox	Won	
Golden Satellite Awards	Best Animated or Mixed Media Feature	Bill Badalato, Gordon Carroll, David Giler and Walter Hill	Nominated	
Hasty Pudding Theatricals	Hasty Pudding Woman of the Year	Sigourney Weaver (also for The Ice Storm and Snow White: A Tale of Terror)	Won	
Saturn Awards	Best Science Fiction Film	Alien Resurrection	Nominated	
Saturn Awards	Best Actress	Sigourney Weaver	Nominated	
Saturn Awards	Best Supporting Actress	Winona Ryder	Nominated	
Saturn Awards	Best Director	Jean-Pierre Jeunet	Nominated	
Saturn Awards	Best Costume	Rob Ringwood	Nominated	
Saturn Awards	Best Special Effects	Pitof, Eric Henry, Alec Gillis and Tom Woodruff Jr.	Nominated	
Stinkers Bad Movie Awards	Worst Actress	Sigourney Weaver	Nominated	
Stinkers Bad Movie Awards	Worst Supporting Actress	Winona Ryder	Nominated	
Stinkers Bad Movie Awards	Worst Sequel	Alien Resurrection	Nominated	
Stinkers Bad Movie Awards	The Sequel Nobody Was Clamoring For	Alien Resurrection	Nominated	

== Prometheus ==
Year	Award	Category	Recipients	Result	Ref.
2012	Golden Trailer Awards	Summer 2012 Blockbuster Trailer	Prometheus / "Not Alone", 20th Century Fox, Wild Card	Nominated	
2012	Golden Trailer Awards	Best Sound Editing	Prometheus, 20th Century Fox, Skip Film	Nominated	
2012	Key Art Awards	Digital	"Weyland Industries" website	Won	
2012	Key Art Awards	Innovative Media	Prometheus	Won	
2012	Phoenix Film Critics Society	Best Visual Effects	Richard Stammers, Charley Henley and Martin Hill	Nominated	
2012	Satellite Awards	Visual Effects	Richard Stammers, Charley Henley and Martin Hill	Nominated	
2012	Satellite Awards	Sound (Editing and Mixing)	Victor Ray Ennis, Ann Scibelli, John Cucci and Mark P. Stoeckinger	Nominated	
2012	Sierra Awards	Best Art Direction	Alex Cameron	Won	
2012	Teen Choice Awards	Choice Movie Breakout	Noomi Rapace	Nominated	
2012	Teen Choice Awards	Choice Summer Movie – Action	Prometheus	Nominated	
2012	Teen Choice Awards	Choice Summer Movie Star – Female	Charlize Theron (also for Snow White & the Huntsman)	Nominated	
2013	Academy Awards	Best Visual Effects	Richard Stammers, Trevor Wood, Charley Henley and Martin Hill	Nominated	
2013	ADG Excellence in Production Design Award	Fantasy Film	Arthur Max	Nominated	
2013	BAFTA Awards	Special Visual Effects	Richard Stammers, Charley Henley, Trevor Wood, Paul Butterworth	Nominated	
2013	Critic's Choice Award	Best Sci-Fi/Horror Movie	Prometheus	Nominated	
2013	Golden Reel Awards	Best Sound Editing — Sound Effects and Foley in a Feature Film	Prometheus	Nominated	
2013	Visual Effects Society	Outstanding Compositing in a Feature Motion Picture	Xavier Bourque, Sam Cole, Simone Riginelli, Denis Scolan for "Engineers & the Orrery"	Nominated	
2013	Visual Effects Society	Outstanding Created Environment in a Live Action Feature Motion Picture	Julien Bolbach, Marco Genovesi, Martin Riedel, Marco Rolandi for "LV-233"	Nominated	
2013	Visual Effects Society	Outstanding Visual Effects in a Visual Effects-Driven Feature Motion Picture	Paul Butterworth, Charley Henley, Allen Maris, Richard Stammers for Prometheus	Nominated	
2013	London Film Critics' Circle Awards	Supporting Actor of the Year	Michael Fassbender	Nominated	
2013	Saturn Awards	Best Science Fiction Film	Prometheus	Nominated	
2013	Saturn Awards	Best Supporting Actor	Michael Fassbender	Nominated	

== Alien: Covenant ==
Year	Award	Category	Recipients	Result	Ref.
2016	IndieWire Critics Poll	Most Anticipated of 2017	Alien: Covenant	Nominated	
2017	Golden Schmoes Awards	Biggest Disappointment of the Year	Alien: Covenant	Nominated	
2017	Golden Trailer Awards	Best Horror Poster	Domestic Teaser, 20th Century Fox, InSync Plus	Won	
2017	Golden Trailer Awards	Best Sound Editing	Theirs, 20th Century Fox, Wild Card	Nominated	
2017	Golden Trailer Awards	Best Summer 2017 Blockbuster TV Spot	Run / Madness, 20th Century Fox, Wild Card	Nominated	
2017	Golden Trailer Awards	Best Summer Blockbuster Poster	Domestic Teaser, 20th Century Fox, InSync Plus	Nominated	
2017	Golden Trailer Awards	Best Teaser Poster	Domestic Teaser, 20th Century Fox, InSync Plus	Nominated	
2017	Hawaii Film Critics Society	Best Supporting Actor	Michael Fassbender	Nominated	
2017	Satellite Awards	Best Visual Effects	Alien: Covenant	Nominated	
2017	Sierra Awards	Best Supporting Actor	Michael Fassbender	Nominated	
2018	Australian Production Design Guild Awards	Docklands Studios Melbourne Award for Excellence in Screen - Acknowledging Excellence in Design and Practice or Artisan Excellence on Australian or International Productions	Ian Gracie (Supervising Art Director); Damien Drew (Senior Art Director); Michelle McGahey (Senior Art Director); Charlie Revai (Art Director); Jacinta Leong (Art Director)	Won	
2018	Golden Trailer Awards	Best Horror TV Spot	Born Neo, 20th Century Fox, Wild Card	Nominated	
2018	Saturn Awards	Best Science Fiction Film	Alien: Covenant	Nominated	

== Alien: Romulus ==
Award	Date of ceremony	Category	Recipient(s)	Result	Ref.
Astra Midseason Movie Awards	July 3, 2024	Most Anticipated Movie	Alien: Romulus	Nominated	
Hollywood Professional Association Awards	November 7, 2024	Outstanding Visual Effects – Live Action Theatrical Feature	Ale Melendez, Steven Denyer, Sebastian Ravagnani, Nicolas Caillier, and Nelson Sepúlveda	Nominated	
Hollywood Professional Association Awards	November 7, 2024	Outstanding Sound – Theatrical Feature	David V. Butler, Mark Paterson, Polly McKinnon, Chris Terhune, Will Files, and Lee Gilmore	Nominated	
Astra Film and Creative Arts Awards	December 8, 2024	Best Horror or Thriller Feature	Alien: Romulus	Nominated	
San Diego Film Critics Society	December 9, 2024	Best Sound Design	Alien: Romulus	Nominated	
San Diego Film Critics Society	December 9, 2024	Best Visual Effects	Alien: Romulus	Nominated	
San Diego Film Critics Society	December 9, 2024	Best Stunt Choreography	Alien: Romulus	Nominated	
St. Louis Film Critics Association	December 15, 2024	Best Visual Effects	Eric Barba, Shane Mahan, and Nelson Sepulveda	Nominated	
Alliance of Women Film Journalists	January 2025	Best Stunt Performance	Cailee Spaeny	Nominated	
Golden Globe Awards	January 5, 2025	Cinematic and Box Office Achievement	Alien: Romulus	Nominated	
Saturn Awards	February 2, 2025	Best Horror Film	Alien: Romulus	Won	
Saturn Awards	February 2, 2025	Best Film Direction	Fede Álvarez	Nominated	
Saturn Awards	February 2, 2025	Best Supporting Actor in a Film	David Jonsson	Nominated	
Saturn Awards	February 2, 2025	Best Supporting Actress in a Film	Cailee Spaeny	Nominated	
Saturn Awards	February 2, 2025	Best Film Production Design	Naaman Marshall	Nominated	
Saturn Awards	February 2, 2025	Best Film Make Up	Pam Smyth	Nominated	
Saturn Awards	February 2, 2025	Best Film Visual / Special Effects	Eric Barba, Nelson Sepulveda-Fauser, Daniel Macarin, and Shane Mahan	Nominated	
Set Decorators Society of America	February 2, 2025	Best Achievement in Décor/Design of a Fantasy or Science Fiction Film	Zsuzsanna Sipos, Naaman Marshall	Nominated	
AACTA Awards	February 7, 2025	Best Visual Effects or Animation	Nelson Sepulveda-Fauser, Jhon Alvarado, Alé Melendez, Sebastian Ravagnani, and Nicolas Caillier	Nominated	
Visual Effects Society Awards	February 11, 2025	Outstanding Model in a Photoreal or Animated Project	Waldemar Bartkowiak, Trevor Wide, Matt Middleton, Ben Shearman (for "Renaissance Space Station" )	Won	
Golden Reel Awards	February 23, 2025	Outstanding Achievement in Sound Editing – Feature Dialogue / ADR	Will Files, Lee Gilmore, Matt "Smokey" Cloud, Polly McKinnon, David Butler, Ryan Cole, Jacob Riehle, Ailene Roberts	Nominated	
Golden Reel Awards	February 23, 2025	Outstanding Achievement in Sound Editing – Feature Effects / Foley	Will Files, Lee Gilmore, Chris Terhune, Luis Galdames, Dan Kenyon, Ken McGill, James Miller, Matt "Smokey" Cloud, Steve Neal, Samuel Munoz, Lyndsey Schenk, Jacob McNaughton, Noel Vought	Nominated	
Academy Awards	March 2, 2025	Best Visual Effects	Eric Barba, Nelson Sepulveda-Fauser, Daniel Macarin and Shane Mahan	Nominated	

== DVD and Blu-ray Disc re-issues ==
=== Alien Quadrilogy ===
Award	Category	Recipients	Result	Ref.
DVD Exclusive Awards	DVDX Award for Best Audio Commentary (New for DVD)	Ridley Scott, Ronald Shusett, Terry Rawlings, Sigourney Weaver, Tom Skerritt, Veronica Cartwright, Harry Dean Stanton and John Hurt (only for Alien)	Won	
DVD Exclusive Awards	DVDX Award for Best Audio Commentary (New for DVD)	James Cameron, Michael Biehn, Jenette Goldstein, Carrie Henn, Christopher Henn, Lance Henriksen, Gale Anne Hurd, Pat McClung, Bill Paxton, Dennis Skotak, Robert Skotak and Stan Winston (only for Aliens)	Nominated	
DVD Exclusive Awards	Best Overall DVD, Classic Movie (Including All Extra Features)	Charles de Lauzirika	Won	
DVD Exclusive Awards	Best New Movie Scenes (Finished-Edited Into Movie or Stand-Alone)	Charles de Lauzirika and David Crowther (only for Alien 3 and Alien Resurrection)	Nominated	
DVD Exclusive Awards	Best Behind-the-Scenes Program (New for DVD)	The Beast Within: The Making of Alien, Charles de Lauzirika	Nominated	
DVD Exclusive Awards	Best Menu Design	Matt Kennedy	Nominated	
Sierra Awards	Best DVD	Alien Quadrilogy	Won	
Satellite Awards	Best DVD Extra	Alien Quadrilogy	Nominated	
Satellite Awards	Best Overall DVD	Alien Quadrilogy	Nominated	
Saturn Awards	Best DVD Collection	Alien Quadrilogy	Nominated	

=== Alien Anthology ===
Award	Category	Recipients	Result	Ref.
IGN Movie Awards	Best Blu-ray	Alien Anthology	Won	
Sierra Awards	Best DVD	Alien Anthology	Won	
Saturn Awards	Best DVD Collection	Alien Anthology	Won	

== See also ==
- List of accolades received by the Predator film series
