= Another 48 Hrs. =

1990 film by Walter Hill

- Theatrical release poster
- Directed by: Walter Hill
- Screenplay by: John Fasano; Jeb Stuart; Larry Gross
- Story by: Fred Braughton
- Based on: Characters by Roger Spottiswoode; Walter Hill; Larry Gross; Steven E. de Souza
- Produced by: Lawrence Gordon; Robert D. Wachs
- Starring: Eddie Murphy; Nick Nolte
- Cinematography: Matthew F. Leonetti
- Edited by: Donn Aron; Carmel Davies; Freeman A. Davies
- Music by: James Horner
- Production company: Eddie Murphy Productions
- Distributed by: Paramount Pictures
- Release date: June 8, 1990
- Running time: 95 minutes
- Country: United States
- Language: English
- Budget: $50 million
- Box office: $153.5 million

Another 48 Hrs. is a 1990 American buddy cop action comedy film directed by Walter Hill and starring Eddie Murphy, Nick Nolte, Brion James, Andrew Divoff, and Ed O'Ross. It is the sequel to the 1982 film 48 Hrs. Nolte reprises his role as San Francisco police officer Jack Cates, who has 48 hours to clear his name from a manslaughter charge. To do so, he again needs the help of Reggie Hammond (Murphy), who is a newly released convict. At the same time, a mastermind who calls himself the Ice Man has hired a pair of bikers to kill Reggie, while a rogue member of the gang (Divoff) is out to kill Jack for the death of his brother from the previous installment.

Another 48 Hrs. was released by Paramount Pictures on June 8, 1990. The film received negative reviews from critics but was a success at the box office grossing $153.5 million against a $50 million budget.

== Plot ==
For the past four years, veteran San Francisco Police Inspector Jack Cates has been after a drug kingpin who calls himself the "Ice Man." At the Hunter's Point Raceway, Jack confronts Tyrone Burroughs and Arthur Brock. Jack kills Brock in a shootout, while Burroughs escapes. Despite killing Brock in self-defense, Jack is now under investigation, because Brock's gun can't be found at the scene. Lt. Blake Wilson from the Internal Affairs Division refuses to believe that the Ice Man even exists. He becomes determined to prosecute Jack on a third-degree manslaughter charge. At the raceway, near where he shot Brock, Jack finds a picture that indicates that the Ice Man has put a price on the head of Reggie Hammond, who is scheduled to be released from prison the next day.

Despite his claims of being innocent, Reggie has completed an extra five years in prison for robbing a prison payroll, which he had started serving after his original two-year sentence was up. As Reggie is released on the next day, Jack tries to convince him to help him clear his name and find the Ice Man. Reggie requests that Jack gives him the $500,000 that Jack has been holding on to for him and let him get back to his life. Jack refuses to give the money unless Reggie helps him.

After Jack gets shot at a diner, and the bus transporting Reggie out of the prison is attacked by two bikers, Jack forces Reggie to help him by having the hospital release him into his custody. Reggie recognizes the biker who shot Jack as Richard "Cherry" Ganz, the brother of Albert Ganz, the escaped convict that Jack killed years earlier. Cherry (who Reggie says, "makes (Albert) Ganz look like Gandhi") and his partner Willie Hickok, the other biker, are the hitmen that the Ice Man has hired to kill Reggie, while Cherry also wants to kill Jack as revenge for Jack killing Albert. Reggie also admits to Jack that the Ice Man was the drug dealer that Reggie and his former gang—Albert, Billy Bear, Luther, and Henry Wong—stole the $500,000 from years ago.

Burroughs, who works for the Ice Man, was trying to hire Brock as insurance, just in case Cherry and Hickok fail to kill Reggie. When the Ice Man kills Hickok's and Cherry's primary contact man, Malcolm Price, Hickok and Cherry, knowing that Burroughs works for the Ice Man, both kill Burroughs in retaliation. Reggie finally admits to Jack that the reason the Ice Man put a hit out on Reggie is because he's seen the Ice Man's face and can identify him.

Reggie owes money to Kirkland Smith, an inmate who protected him from the Ice Man's hitmen in prison. Reggie goes to the goodwill store where Kirkland's daughter Amy works, so he can give her the money that he owes to Kirkland, but the two are captured by Cherry and Hickok and taken to a local nightclub called the Bird Cage, in San Francisco's North Beach neighborhood. Inspector Frank Cruise (Ed O'Ross) arrives and orders Cherry and Hickok to kill Reggie and Amy. Before that can happen, Jack shows up as Reggie identifies the Ice Man as Inspector Ben Kehoe -- Jack's friend and fellow officer—with Cruise serving as Kehoe's accomplice. Kehoe had Cruise pick Brock's gun up at the track so it wouldn't be found, because Kehoe believed that Jack was getting too close to identifying him as the Ice Man.

A shootout ensues, with Jack wounding Hickok and Cherry, and killing Cruise. After Reggie kills Hickok and Cherry, he is held captive by Kehoe and used as a human shield. Reggie, angry about how horribly his day has gone, sarcastically begs Jack to shoot him. Jack, seeing a way to get Reggie out of Kehoe's grip, fires a shot into Reggie's shoulder, wounding him, and then kills Kehoe by shooting him. Before Reggie is transported to the hospital, Jack lets him know of the $500,000 that he took off of Kehoe. As the ambulance leaves with Reggie, Jack realizes that Reggie has again stolen his lighter. They both laugh about it—Reggie in the ambulance, and Jack standing with Amy outside the Bird Cage club.

== Cast ==
- Eddie Murphy as Reggie Hammond
- Nick Nolte as Inspector Jack Cates
- Brion James as Inspector Ben Kehoe / The Ice Man
- Kevin Tighe as Lieutenant Blake Wilson
- Ed O'Ross as Inspector Frank Cruise
- David Anthony Marshall as Willie Hickok
- Andrew Divoff as Richard "Cherry" Ganz
- Bernie Casey as Kirkland Smith
- Brent Jennings as Tyrone Burroughs
- John Del Regno as Arthur Brock
- Ted Markland as Malcolm Price
- Tisha Campbell as Amy Smith
- Felice Orlandi as The Warden
- Kitten Natividad as Girl In Movie
- Edward Walsh as Inspector Joe Stevens
- Frank McRae as Captain Haden

== Production ==
=== Development and writing ===
Eddie Murphy had been paid $200,000 for his role in the original film. By the time of the sequel, his fee was $12 million up front, plus a percentage of the gross.

The film was based on an original story by Murphy who asked Walter Hill if he was interested in directing.

I was, to tell you the truth, a little skeptical. They usually come out twice as expensive and half as good. Not always. I think the Leone movies always got better, and there are a few others. And I felt the studio might encourage me to make a softer film, and if you made a softer version of 48 Hours you're going to have Beverly Hills Cop... So Eddie jumped up, and he convinced me he really very much wanted to do a movie that represented the spirit of the first one, with a lot of street energy and the hard edges of the original. Then Nolte called me a day later, and said, 'Whaddya think, Walt?' ... Nick said, 'If we do one and it stinks, we're still batting .500, which I assume is pretty good in the American League.

Hill added that "the plot – which Eddie suggested – is actually kind of intriguing. So why not do it?... A lot of folks will say I'm just doing it for the money. What I want to know is, why do they think I made the first one?"

=== Post-production ===
The original workprint of the film was 145 minutes long. It was cut by either director Hill or the Paramount studio down to 120 minutes, and a week before its summer theatrical release an additional 25 minutes were cut out by Paramount, making a final theatrical version 95 minutes long, but also creating a lot of plot holes and continuity mistakes in the film. Frank McRae's reprisal of his role from the original 48 Hrs. was entirely cut except for a brief, uncredited shot of him in the background of one scene in the police station. Also removed was a scene which was partially shown in the theatrical trailer in which Jack explains to Reggie that he has a deadline to track down the Ice Man; as such, there is no mention of '48 hours' anywhere in the final film. Brion James, also returning from the original, saw his role severely cut down as well, to create a faster-paced action-comedy. In an interview, James said this about the cuts made on the film:

Total Recall came out a week before Another 48 Hrs. (1990) that summer, it made twenty-five million, became the number one movie in the country and the studio panicked because they had invested a lot in the 48 Hours films, but they felt that at well over two hours, that the movie might be too much. My stuff was in there until one week before the film opened; that is when they cut twenty-five minutes out of that movie, a week before it opened. It went from around 140 to down around 95 minutes. They said, "Cut all the behavior, action, comedy..." I lost every major scene I had. That's the last time I ever cared about a movie because I went to the press screening and it was like getting kicked in the stomach, seeing what is not there. I was the third lead and now I looked like a dressed extra. All the stuff that they had in the set-up, stuff in the trailer, all those scenes were gone.

== Music ==
Another 48 Hrs.

Soundtrack album by various artists
- Released: 1990
- Genres: Stage & Screen
- Length: 38:24
- Label: Scotti Bros.

Professional ratings
Review scores
Source	Rating
Allmusic	3/5 stars

1. "The Boys Are Back In Town" - Jesse Johnson 4:01
2. "Give It All You Got" - Curio 4:37
3. "I Just Can't Let It End" - Curio 3:52
4. Another 48 Hrs., film score~The Courthouse - James Horner 3:18
5. Another 48 Hrs., film score~Main Title - James Horner 4:11
6. Another 48 Hrs., film score~King Mei Shootout - James Horner 7:36
7. Another 48 Hrs., film score~Birdcage Battle - James Horner 4:43
8. I'll Never Get You Out of This World Alive - Michael Stanton 2:25

== Reception ==
=== Box office ===
The film opened at number one in the US with an opening weekend gross of $19,475,559, Paramount's biggest opening non-holiday weekend gross, surpassing the record set by Star Trek V: The Final Frontier. Overall, it grossed more at the US box office than its predecessor and made $72.7 million from foreign markets for a total of $153.5 million. However this was considered a box office disappointment and because the film was so costly, profits were minimized. Murphy accused Paramount of not spending enough on advertising and changing the release date. Paramount counter-alleged that Murphy did not spend enough time promoting the film. This led to tension in the long-running relationship between Murphy and Paramount.

=== Critical response ===
On Rotten Tomatoes the film holds an approval rating of 19% based on 36 reviews, with an average rating of 4.3/10. The website's critics consensus reads: "Even the return of Eddie Murphy, Nick Nolte, and director Walter Hill can't hide the lazy, patchwork quality of Another 48 Hrs." On Metacritic, the film has a weighted average score of 23 out of 100, based on 13 critics, indicating "generally unfavorable" reviews. Audiences polled by CinemaScore gave the film an average grade of "A−" on an A+ to F scale.

Vincent Canby of The New York Times stated that it was "as much a star vehicle for Mr. Murphy as The Gorgeous Hussy once was for Joan Crawford. The Crawford name isn't idly invoked. You have to go back to the old MGM days to find movies that, with every gesture, let the audience know it was watching a star." Canby continued, "Though the body count is high, all of the people killed are faceless or only minor characters, until the end. It's as if the movie were saying that lethal violence is acceptable (and fun) as long as the victims–like the victims of guided missiles and high-altitude bombing–remain anonymous. Any comedy that allows the mind to ponder high-altitude bombing is in deep trouble."

Los Angeles Times critic Peter Rainer called it "a crude rehashing of the high points of the first film." Ranier singled out director Hill, who he said "surely recognizes the hollowness of what he's doing here. He tries to ram through the muddled exposition as quickly as possible; essentially, the film is wall-to-wall mayhem, with more shots of hurled bodies shattering windows than I've ever seen in a movie."

In 2025, The Hollywood Reporter listed Another 48 Hrs. as having the best stunts of 1990.

Nick Nolte was very critical of the finished film: "48 Hrs was a great film. The sequel was terrible. I needed some cash, Walter needed some cash ... Eddie [Murphy] didn't."
