= Genetic World =

Studio album by Télépopmusik
- Released: May 21, 2001; April 16, 2002 (re-release)
- Genre: Electronic
- Length: 54:14
- Label: Capitol

Télépopmusik chronology
Genetic World (2001)	Angel Milk (2005)

Singles from Genetic World
- 1. "Breathe" Released: 2001; 2. "Love Can Damage Your Health" Released: 2002; 3. "Smile" Released: 2001

Professional ratings
Aggregate scores
Source	Rating
Metacritic	70/100
Review scores
Source	Rating
AllMusic	3/5 stars
Drowned in Sound	5/10
The Guardian	2/5 stars
Playlouder	2.5/5 stars

Genetic World is the debut studio album by the French electronic music trio Télépopmusik, released in 2001. The album was re-released in 2002 as per request of the producer Heisenberg. Angela McCluskey appeared as a special guest vocalist and co-writer of many of the album's tracks. She performed on "Love Can Damage Your Health", "Smile", "Breathe", and "Yesterday Was a Lie", the first three of which were also singles.

One of the singles, "Breathe", was a commercial success, charting in both the US and the UK.

McCluskey and the members of Télépopmusik first met when they opened for the band Wild Colonials (of which McCluskey was a member) in New York and struck a friendship.

== Critical reception ==
The album was met with praise from music critics upon its release. On review aggregate website Metacritic, the album holds a score of 70/100, indicating "generally favorable reviews". Tom Semioli, writing for AllMusic, awarded the album 3 out of 5 stars and felt that, while the album was eclectic, it was still good. He singled out "Dance Me", "Da Hoola", and "Let's Go Again" as choice cuts, and concluded that the album "contains a little something for every music fan." Spin included the album in its "More New Music to Hear Now" section in the July 2002 issue, with critic Jeffrey Rotter calling it "mood music for tomorrow's Putumayo stores" and comparing "Love Can Damage Your Health" to "what a sonogram sounds like to a club-kid fetus". CMJ New Music Report critic Doug Levy praised the album's combination of diverse genres and highlighted "Love Can Damage Your Health", "Let's Go Again", and "Trishika".

=== Accolades ===
"Breathe" was nominated for a Grammy Award in the category Best Dance Recording at the ceremony held in February 2004. It lost, however, to "Come into My World" by Kylie Minogue.

== Track listing ==
1. "Breathe" (featuring Angela McCluskey) – 4:39
2. "Genetic World" (featuring Soda-Pop) – 3:59
3. "Love Can Damage Your Health" (featuring Angela McCluskey) – 5:32 *
4. "Smile" (featuring Angela McCluskey) – 3:58
5. "Dance Me" – 3:33
6. "Da Hoola (Soda-Pop Mix)" – 4:12 *
7. "Let's Go Again" – 3:01 *
8. "Trishika" (featuring Soda-Pop) – 5:56 *
9. "Yesterday Was a Lie" – 4:59 *
10. "L'Incertitude D'Heisenberg" – 5:50 *
11. "Breathe (New Extended Mix)" (featuring Angela McCluskey) (Bonus track) – 5:55

International version

1. "Breathe" (featuring Angela McCluskey) – 4:39
2. "Genetic World" (featuring Soda-Pop) – 3:59
3. "Love Can Damage your Health" (featuring Angela McCluskey) – 5:32 *
4. "Animal Man" (featuring Juice Aleem) – 4:27 *
5. "Free" (featuring Juice Aleem) – 3:52
6. "Let's Go Again" (featuring Gonzales and Peaches) – 3:01 *
7. "Dance Me" – 3:33
8. "Da Hoola (Soda-Pop Mix)" – 4:12 *
9. "Smile" (featuring Angela McCluskey) – 3:58
10. "Trishika" (featuring Soda-Pop) – 5:56 *
11. "Yesterday Was a Lie" – 4:59 *
12. "δp.δq≥h/4π" – 5:50 *

Note

tracks Noted * feature short, numbered (1–7) interludes entitled "Labs" at the end.

== Charts ==
Aided by the success of "Breathe", the album charted in the UK, where it reached number 88. Genetic World was also somewhat successful in the United States, where it reached number 5 on the Dance/Electronic Albums chart, spending more than 20 weeks total on the chart.

Chart (2002–2003)	Peak position
UK Albums (OCC)	88
US Dance/Electronic Albums (Billboard)	5
US Heatseekers Pacific (Billboard)	7

It has sold over 350,000 copies worldwide.
