= Dead Man on Campus =

1998 American comedy film by Alan Cohn

- Theatrical release poster
- Directed by: Alan Cohn
- Screenplay by: Michael Traeger; Mike White
- Story by: Anthony Abrams; Adam Larson Broder
- Produced by: Gale Anne Hurd
- Starring: Tom Everett Scott; Mark-Paul Gosselaar
- Cinematography: John A. Thomas
- Edited by: Debra Chiate
- Music by: Mark Mothersbaugh
- Production companies: MTV Productions; Pacific Western
- Distributed by: Paramount Pictures
- Release date: August 21, 1998
- Running time: 96 minutes
- Country: United States
- Language: English
- Budget: $14 million
- Box office: $15 million

Dead Man on Campus is a 1998 American black comedy film starring Tom Everett Scott and Mark-Paul Gosselaar. It centers on the urban legend that a student gets straight As if their roommate commits suicide (see pass by catastrophe). Two failing friends attempt to find a depressed roommate to push him over the edge and receive As.

To boost ticket sales, the film's U.S. release was timed with the start of the new college school year in late August 1998. The film was shot at University of the Pacific in Stockton, California. Dead Man on Campus was released by Paramount Pictures on August 21, 1998 to negative reviews from critics while grossing $15 million against a $14 million budget.

== Plot ==
Josh gets into college on a scholarship, and Cooper is assigned as his roommate. Cooper does little work and instead spends all the time partying and consistently fails his courses, but his father continues to pay his tuition. The normally studious Josh is led astray by Cooper's lifestyle, and spends the first half of his first year partying instead of studying, and consequently fails all of his midterm exams.

To his horror, Josh learns that a condition of his scholarship is a B+ average each year, and that with his poor midterm score, he needs an A+++ in all of his courses or he will lose his scholarship. Meanwhile, Cooper's father finally realizes Cooper is not trying to pass his courses at all, and threatens to pull his funding if he does not get a passing mark this year, leaving him in a similar position.

Cooper and Josh find out about an obscure academic rule that states that if a student's roommate commits suicide, then the roommates get perfect marks for that year, regardless of any previous academic standing. They set out to find roommates who they believe are likely to commit suicide; however, they soon realize that their first potential roommate, Cliff O'Malley, is more likely to get himself (and anyone with him) killed or arrested, and jump out of his moving car when he is being chased by the police.

Next they try Buckley Schrank, a computer geek who thinks Bill Gates wants his brain. After they move him in, they try to push him over the edge. First, Cooper poses as a suicide hotline volunteer, and when Buckley calls, tells him he is Bill Gates and wants his brain. Cooper buys items that may be used in a suicide (rope, daggers, prescription drugs), but as he and Josh are trying to plant them around the dorm room, Buckley discovers them and flees, thinking that the conspiracy is real and they are trying to kill him.

Finally, Josh and Cooper move in with Matt Noonan, a moody rock musician. Later, Cooper catches him singing show tunes and learns he was voted Mr. Happy in high school, leading them to believe that he is only pretending to be depressed to impress girls and make a name for himself in music. Facing the loss of his scholarship, Josh stands on the edge of a bridge, about to commit suicide himself. Cooper tells Josh he is not a failure and talks him down. When Josh comes down from the bridge, he reveals to Cooper that he was faking his suicide attempt so the school would not fail him, and Cooper would look like a hero to his father.

The film ends with Josh narrating that he was given an additional semester to improve his grades, in which he saved his scholarship, and that Cooper became a more serious student, but did work summers cleaning toilets for his father's business to learn how to eventually take over.

== Cast ==
- Mark-Paul Gosselaar as Cooper Frederickson
- Tom Everett Scott as Josh Miller
- Poppy Montgomery as Rachel Gillmore
- Lochlyn Munro as Clifford "Cliff" O'Malley
- Randy Pearlstein as Buckley Schrank
- Corey Page as Matthew "Matt" Noonan
- Alyson Hannigan as Lucy
- Shelley Malil as Biology Professor
- Mari Morrow as Kristin
- Dave Ruby as Zeke
- Jason Segel as Kyle
- Linda Cardellini as Kelly

== Production ==
Filming occurred in early-mid 1997, and it was originally intended to be released in August 1997, in time for the start of the new college school year. It was the first role Alyson Hannigan did after completing work on the inaugural season of Buffy the Vampire Slayer, which was airing on The WB as the movie was being shot. Two of the cast members, Poppy Montgomery and Corey Page, were born in Australia, although both used fake American accents for their characters.

Scenes were shot on the campus of University of the Pacific (Stockton, California), Modesto's 7th Street Bridge, and outside the campus of University of Southern California.

== Reception ==
The film grossed $15,064,946 domestically against a $14 million budget.

Dead Man on Campus received negative reviews from critics. The movie has a 15% rating on the aggregate film review site Rotten Tomatoes based on 47 reviews. The site's consensus reads, "Not much of a story." Metacritic, which uses a weighted average, assigned the film a score of 27 out of 100, based on 14 critics, indicating "generally unfavorable" reviews. Audiences polled by CinemaScore gave the film an average grade of "C+" on an A+ to F scale.

The New York Times said the film was "predictably dumb", but praised Mark-Paul Gosselaar's performance, saying, "Mr. Gosselaar is so good, however, that his performance as Cooper sometimes overrides the film's adolescent tone."

The San Francisco Chronicle's Mick LaSalle said although there were some laughs, "the overall premise, involving mental illness and suicide, isn't all that funny, at least not in practice, and the picture begins to seem labored and long. Josh and his buddy go through the last hour of Dead Man on Campus anxious and unhappy. When they stop having fun, so does the audience."

Siskel and Ebert did not review the film on their show in 1998, despite the film being a major studio release.

== Soundtrack ==
Dead Man on Campus - Original Soundtrack

Soundtrack album
- Released: August 4, 1998
- Genres: Alternative rock, alternative metal
- Length: 55:27
- Label: DreamWorks Records

Professional ratings
Review scores
Source	Rating
AllMusic	3/5 stars

The film's soundtrack album was released on August 4, 1998, by DreamWorks Records. It was one of only three film soundtracks that DreamWorks Records ever released which weren't related to their parent company DreamWorks Pictures, with the other two also being for comedy films owned by Paramount Pictures (1998's A Night at the Roxbury and 2000's The Ladies Man). Paramount's parent company Viacom later acquired the live-action library of DreamWorks Pictures for $1.6 billion in 2006, although DreamWorks Records itself was sold to Universal Music Group for $100 million in 2003.

Five of the album's artists (Self, Propellerheads, Powerman 5000, Jonathan Fire*Eater and Creeper Lagoon) were all signed to DreamWorks Records at the time.

=== Track listing ===
No.	Title	Writer(s)	Producer(s)	Length
1.	"Golden Years" (Marilyn Manson)	David Bowie	The Dust Brothers	3:49
2.	"Cowboy Song" (Blur)	Damon Albarn; Graham Coxon; Alex James; Dave Rowntree	The Dust Brothers	4:03
3.	"Human" (Elastica)	Donna Matthews; Bruce Gilbert; Robert Gotobed; Graham Lewis; Colin Newman	Alan Moulder; Elastica	3:28
4.	"We Still Need More (Than Anyone Can Give)" (Supergrass)	Daniel Goffey; Gareth Coombes; Michael Quinn; Robert Coombes	The Dust Brothers	3:44
5.	"Paint by Numbers" (Self)	Matt Mahaffey	Matt Mahaffey	3:07
6.	"Realize (The Chemical Brothers Remix)" (The Dust Brothers)	John King; Michael Simpson	The Dust Brothers; The Chemical Brothers (add.)	3:59
7.	"Super Bon Bon (Propellerheads Mix)" (Soul Coughing)	Sebastian Steinberg; Mark Degli Antoni; Michael Doughty; Yuval Gabay	David Kahne	5:36
8.	"Organizized" (Powerman 5000)	Michael Cummings; Dorian Heartsong; Allan Pahanish, Jr.; Adam Williams; Jordan Cohen	Powerman 5000; Mudrock	3:56
9.	"Bound & Tied" (Creed)	Mark Tremonti; Scott Stapp	John Kurzweg	5:36
10.	"Sleeper" (Audioweb)	Martin Merchant; Sean McCann; Robin File	Jonathan Quarmby; Kevin Bacon	5:13
11.	"Walking in the Dark" (Goldfinger)	John Feldmann; Charlie Paulson	Jay Rifkin; John Feldmann	3:00
12.	"When the Curtain Calls for You" (Jonathan Fire*Eater)	Walter Martin; Tom Frank; Matt Barrick; Stewart Lupton; Paul Maroon		2:35
13.	"Empty Ships" (Creeper Lagoon)	Ian Sefchick	John King	3:48
14.	"I Only Want to Be with You" (Twiggy & Twiggy)	Mike Hawker; Ivor Raymonde	Twiggy Ramirez; Sean Beavan; The Dust Brothers (add.)	3:33

Notes

- "Human" contains elements from "Lowdown" (Colin Newman, Bruce Gilbert, Graham Lewis, Robert Gotobed), performed by Wire.

== See also ==
- Academic grading in the United States
- The Curve, a 1998 thriller film with the same premise, also known as Dead Man's Curve
