= Fruit of Life =

Studio album by Wild Colonials
- Released: 1994
- Recorded: 1993 at Real World, Box, Wiltshire, England and at Sunset Sound Factory, Hollywood, California, U.S.
- Genre: Folk rock
- Length: 56:01
- Label: DGC
- Producer: Tchad Blake

Wild Colonials chronology
Fruit of Life (1994)	This Can't Be Life (1996)

Fruit of Life is the debut album by the Wild Colonials, released in 1994. "Spark" was released as a single and was a radio hit. The band supported the album with a North American tour, including shows with Toad the Wet Sprocket and Grant Lee Buffalo.

== Production ==
Recorded partly at Real World Studios, the album was produced by Tchad Blake. Chad Smith and Pete Thomas contributed to the album. Frontwoman Angela McCluskey wrote or cowrote nine of the album's 10 songs. "Dear Mike" is a homage to Mike Scott. "Don't Explain" is a cover of the Billie Holidays song. "Rainbow" borrows from Carmen.

== Critical reception ==
Professional ratings
Review scores
Source	Rating
AllMusic	4.5/5 stars
Los Angeles Daily News	3/4 stars
Los Angeles Times	3/4 stars
The Republican	3/5 stars
The Tampa Tribune	3/4 stars

The Los Angeles Times praised McCluskey's "throaty Scotswoman vocals, and a violin-dominated, Celtic-friendly sound that's warm even by coffeehouse standards." The Record wrote that "the restrained musical backdrop—mostly piano, acoustic guitar and occasional horns—serves McCluskey's rich voice perfectly." The Tampa Tribune deemed Fruit of Life "the freshest debut album since last year's Everybody Else Is Doing It, So Why Can't We? by the Cranberries."

The News Tribune stated that "Irish chanteys, American R&B and folk styles are merged with Middle Eastern and even African rhythms." The State advised: "Call it world folk, more compelling than a cowboy junkie, more tantalizing than 10,000 maniacs." The Republican noted that "much of the lyrical content here is dark, and the music ranges from the deeply brooding to undeniably uplifting."

AllMusic called the album "an inventive pastiche of a variety of folk and pop influences."

== Track listing ==
All songs written by various members of the Wild Colonials except for the Billie Holiday cover "Don't Explain".

1. "Girl" (McCluskey/Shark/Cantelon/Roewe) – 6:28
2. "Spark" (McCluskey/Shark) – 4:20
3. "Heaven & Hell" (McCluskey/Roewe) – 5:20
4. "Philadelphia Story" (McCluskey/Shark/Cantelon) – 4:52
5. "Mission" (McCluskey/Shark/Cantelon/Roewe/Bernard) – 6:05
6. "Alice" (McCluskey/Shark/Cantelon/Roewe) – 4:58
7. "Rainbow" (McCluskey/Shark/Cantelon) – 5:12
8. "Don't Explain" (Holiday/Herzog) – 6:46
9. "Victim" (McCluskey/Shark/Cantelon/Roewe) – 5:59
10. "Dear Mike" (McCluskey/Shark/Cantelon/Roewe) – 6:13

== Personnel ==
- Angela McCluskey – vocals
- Shark – guitars, vocals, percussion
- Paul Cantelon – violin, piano, harmonium
- Scott Roewe – piano, organ, bass, sax, chanter, didgeridoo, tin whistle

with

- Matt Chamberlain – drums, percussion
- Pete Thomas – drums, percussion
- Joel Virgel Vierset – percussion
- Glen C. Holmon – bass
- Martin Tillmann – cello
- Chad Smith – drums on "Dear Mike"
- Julio "Jimmy" Ledezma – drums on "Philadelphia Story"
- Pandit Dinesh – tablas on "Victim"
- Guy Pratt – bass on "Heaven & Hell"
- Erik G. Hanson – percussion on "Heaven & Hell"

Production

- Producer: Tchad Blake
- Recorded by: Tchad Blake
- Additional engineering: John Paterno, James Cadsky, Richard Evans
