= List of accolades received by the Predator film series =

List of accolades received by the Predator franchise
Awards & Nominations
Award	Won	Nominated
Academy Award	0	1
Australian Cinematographers Society	1	0
Black Reel Awards	0	1
BMI Film Music Awards	1	0
Fantasporto	0	1
Golden Reel Awards	1	0
Hugo Awards	0	1
Saturn Awards	1	6
Taurus World Stunt Awards	2	0
Young Artist Awards	0	1
- Total number of wins and nominations
Totals	6	11
- Footnotes

Predator is a science fiction/horror film franchise originally conceived by screenwriters Jim and John Thomas. Originating from a joke makings rounds around Hollywood about Rocky Balboa fighting an alien, the Thomas brothers penned a screenplay for the first film, Predator, which was acquired by 20th Century Fox and released in 1987. Since then, there have been three sequels released intermittently, including Predator 2 in 1990 and Predators in 2010 and The Predator, in 2018. A prequel Prey, was released in 2022. The franchise is about the interactions with a barbaric and technologically advanced races called the "Predators", which hunt humans for sport.

Though the critical consensus of the Predator franchise has been overall mixed, the films have been met with praise for their visual effects, including an Academy Award nomination for Best Visual Effects and a number of wins and nominations for the Saturn Awards.

== Predator ==
Organization	Award category	Recipients	Result	Ref.
Academy Awards	Best Visual Effects	Joel Hynek, Robert M. Greenberg, Richard Greenberg and Stan Winston	Nominated	
BMI Film Music Awards	BMI Film Music Award	Alan Silvestri	Won	
Golden Reel Awards	Best Sound Editing - Sound Effects	Richard Shorr	Won	
Hugo Awards	Hugo Award for Best Dramatic Presentation		Nominated	
Saturn Awards	Best Science Fiction Film		Nominated	
Saturn Awards	Best Actor	Arnold Schwarzenegger	Nominated	
Saturn Awards	Best Music	Alan Silvestri	Won	
Saturn Awards	Best Special Effects	Joel Hynek, Robert M. Greenberg, Richard Greenberg and Stan Winston	Nominated	

== Predator 2 ==
Organization	Award category	Recipients	Result	Ref.
Australian Cinematographers Society	Best Cinematographer	Peter Levy	Won	
Fantasporto	Best Film	Stephen Hopkins	Nominated	
Saturn Awards	Best Science Fiction Film		Nominated	
Saturn Awards	Best Make-up	Stan Winston and Scott H. Eddo	Nominated	
Saturn Awards	Best Special Effects	Stan Winston and Joel Hynek	Nominated	

== Predators ==
Organization	Award category	Recipients	Result	Ref.
Black Reel Awards	Best Supporting Actor	Laurence Fishburne	Nominated	
Taurus World Stunt Awards	Best High Work	The stunt team fell off an 80' cliff, crashing to the water below. No CGI or wires were used. (rewarded stunts: Heidi Pascoe, Bob Brown, Jeremy Fitzgerald, Ryan Ryusaki and Troy Robinson)	Won	
Taurus World Stunt Awards	Best Specialty Stunt	Five people tumble and fall down a steep hill about 100' and end up going over an 80' cliff and freefall into the water. No CGI was used for this stunt.	Won	

== The Predator ==
Organization	Award category	Recipients	Result	Ref.
Golden Trailer Awards	Best Voice Over TV Spot	Predators and Prey, 20th Century Fox, Trailer Park, Inc.	Nominated	
Golden Trailer Awards	Golden Fleece TV Spot	Upgrade, 20th Century Fox, Rogue Planet	Nominated	
Golden Trailer Awards	Best Thriller Poster	20th Century Fox, Concept Art	Nominated	
Young Artist Awards	Best Performance in a Feature Film: Supporting Teen Artist	Nikolas Dukic	Nominated	

== Prey ==
Award	Date of ceremony	Category	Recipient(s)	Result	Ref.
Alliance of Women Film Journalists	January 5, 2023	Best Woman Breakthrough Performance	Amber Midthunder	Nominated	
American Cinema Editors Awards	March 5, 2023	Best Edited Feature Film (Non-Theatrical)	Prey	Nominated	
Austin Film Critics Association	January 10, 2023	The Robert R. "Bobby" McCurdy Memorial Breakthrough Artist Award	Amber Midthunder	Nominated	
Chicago Film Critics Association	December 14, 2022	Most Promising Performer	Amber Midthunder	Nominated	
Cinema Audio Society Awards	March 4, 2023	Outstanding Achievement in Sound Mixing for a Non-Theatrical Motion Pictures or Limited Series	Ron Osiowy, Craig Henighan, Chris Terhune, Joel Dougherty, Frank Wolf, Jamison Rabbe, Connor Nagy	Nominated	
Critics' Choice Awards	January 15, 2023	Best Movie Made for Television	Prey	Nominated	
Critics' Choice Awards	January 15, 2023	Best Actress in a Limited Series or Movie Made for Television	Amber Midthunder	Nominated	
Primetime Emmy Awards	September 18, 2023	Outstanding Directing for a Limited or Anthology Series or Movie	Dan Trachtenberg	Nominated	
Primetime Emmy Awards	September 18, 2023	Outstanding Writing for a Limited or Anthology Series or Movie	Patrick Aison and Dan Trachtenberg	Nominated	
Primetime Creative Arts Emmy Awards	September 18, 2023	Outstanding Television Movie	Prey	Nominated	
Primetime Creative Arts Emmy Awards	September 18, 2023	Outstanding Music Composition for a Limited or Anthology Series, Movie or Special	Sarah Schachner	Nominated	
Primetime Creative Arts Emmy Awards	September 18, 2023	Primetime Emmy Award for Outstanding Picture Editing for a Limited or Anthology Series or Movie	Angela M. Catanzaro, Claudia Castello	Nominated	
Primetime Creative Arts Emmy Awards	September 18, 2023	Outstanding Sound Editing for a Limited or Anthology Series, Movie or Special	Chris Terhune, William Files, Jessie Anne Spence, James Miller, Diego Perez, Lee Gilmore, Christopher Bonis, Daniel DiPrima, Stephen Perone, Leslie Bloome, Shaun Brennan	Won	
Fangoria Chainsaw Awards	May 22, 2023	Best Streaming Premiere Film	Prey	Won	
Fangoria Chainsaw Awards	May 22, 2023	Best Lead Performance	Amber Midthunder	Nominated	
Fangoria Chainsaw Awards	May 22, 2023	Best Costume Design	Stephanie Portnoy Porter	Won	
Fangoria Chainsaw Awards	May 22, 2023	Best Creature FX	Alec Gillis, Tom Woodruff	Won	
Golden Reel Awards	February 26, 2023	Outstanding Achievement in Sound Editing – Non-Theatrical Feature	Chris Terhune, Will Files, James Miller, Christopher Bonis, Diego Perez, Lee Gilmore, Jessie Anne Spence, David Bach, Korey Pereira, Nick Seaman, Roni Pillischer, Annie Taylor, Leslie Bloome, Shaun Brennan	Won	
Hollywood Music in Media Awards	November 16, 2022	Best Original Score – Streamed Live Action Film (No Theatrical Release)	Sarah Schachner	Won	
Hugo Awards	October 21, 2023	Best Dramatic Presentation (Long Form)	Prey	Declined nomination	
ICG Publicists Awards	2023	Maxwell Weinberg Award for Television Publicity Campaign	Prey	Nominated	
Kansas City Film Critics Circle	2022	Best Science Fiction, Fantasy or Horror	Prey	Nominated	
Producers Guild of America Awards	February 25, 2023	Best Streamed or Televised Movie	Prey	Nominated	
Saturn Awards	February 4, 2024	Best Science Fiction Film	Prey	Nominated	
Saturn Awards	February 4, 2024	Best Actress in a Film	Amber Midthunder	Nominated	
Saturn Awards	February 4, 2024	Best Film Make-Up	Alec Gillis & Tom Woodruff	Nominated	

== See also ==
- List of accolades received by the Alien film series
