= Big Bam Boo =

- Origin: United Kingdom
- Genres: Pop, pop rock
- Years active: 1987–1991
- Labels: MCA
- Past members: Simon Tedd; Shark

Big Bam Boo were a British/Canadian male pop duo, comprising Simon Tedd and Shark. The band released their debut LP, Fun Faith & Fairplay on MCA/Uni in 1989. Tedd later changed his name to Simon Scardanelli.

The single "Shooting From My Heart", entered the UK Singles Chart, on 28 January 1989, reaching #61. In the U.S.A. #21 Mainstream Rock, and was Top 40 in Canada.

== Discography ==
=== Albums ===
Year	Album	CAN	UK
1989	Fun, Faith and Fairplay	#68	-

=== Singles ===
Year	Song	CAN	UK
1988	"Fell Off a Mountain"	-	#90
1989	"Shooting From My Heart"	#36	#61
1989	"If You Could See Me Now"	#84	-
