= The Curve (1998 film) =

American thriller film

Dead Man's Curve (US title)
- DVD cover
- Directed by: Dan Rosen
- Written by: Dan Rosen
- Produced by: Michael Amato; Jeremy Lew; Ted Schipper; Alain Siritzky
- Starring: Matthew Lillard; Michael Vartan; Randall Batinkoff; Keri Russell
- Cinematography: Joey Forsyte
- Edited by: Glenn Garland
- Music by: Shark
- Distributed by: Trimark Pictures
- Release date: January 23, 1998
- Running time: 91 minutes
- Country: United States
- Language: English

The Curve is a 1998 American thriller film starring Matthew Lillard, Keri Russell and Michael Vartan, which premiered at the 1998 Sundance Film Festival under its original title, Dead Man's Curve. It draws on the urban legend that a student will receive an A letter grade should their roommate commit suicide (pass by catastrophe).

== Plot ==
After hearing of a school policy granting anyone whose roommate commits suicide an automatic 4.0 GPA, Harvard Business School aspirants Chris and Tim plot to kill their roommate Rand and make it look like a suicide. They're successful, but when the fallout breeds unforeseen consequences and two local detectives close in, guilt and mistrust fester, jeopardizing Chris's relationship with his girlfriend Emma and the roommates' futures.

== Cast ==
- Matthew Lillard as Tim
- Michael Vartan as Chris
- Keri Russell as Emma
- Randall Batinkoff as Rand
- Dana Delany as Dr. Ashley
- Tamara Craig Thomas as Natalie
- Bo Dietl as Detective Amato
- Anthony Griffith as Detective Shipper
- Kevin Ruf as Ernie
- Kris McGaha as Renee

== Production ==
Filming took place in Baltimore, Maryland at Elk Neck State Park, Johns Hopkins University, and Towson University in August 1997.

== Release ==
The film premiered at the 1998 Sundance Film Festival as an Official Selection. The film was renamed The Curve after its Sundance premiere to avoid confusion with the film Dead Man on Campus, a comedy with a similar pass by catastrophe premise about two college roommates who try to get another roommate to commit suicide which was released the same year. In the UK and Australia, however, the film was released as Dead Man's Curve.

== Reception ==
The Curve was met with a mostly negative reception. It holds a score of 0% on the review aggregator website Rotten Tomatoes, based on 8 reviews. In a review for Variety, Dennis Harvey commented that "Curve bends too low for upscale auds, it’s also problematic for mainstream ones as a near-horror thriller sans onscreen violence (or genuinely surprising plot twists). It will take aggressive marketing to reap quick payoff on a film likely to get just lukewarm critical and word-of-mouth response."

In a more favorable review, William Thomas of Empire rated the film 4/5 stars and stated that it has "boasting originality, an easy-going hipness and a disregard for convention, this represents all that's good about the American indie scene."

== Soundtrack ==
Prior to the start of filming, writer/director Dan Rosen and score composer Shark made a mixtape of songs they were considering for use in the film, which Rosen gave to the principal actors in The Curve to establish the film's tone. When editor Glenn Garland put together the first edit of the film, he used music from this mix tape as "temp music," and many of the songs ended up in the final film.

A song-based soundtrack album featuring songs from The Curve was released in Japan through Toho Records.

Chromatic Records released a soundtrack album that featured 14 tracks composed by Shark, an aria from the 1892 opera La Wally and the songs "Die" by Starbelly, "Bela Lugosi's Dead" by Bauhaus and "Wake Up Sad (remix)" by Wild Colonials.
