= Pass by catastrophe =

Academic urban legend

Pass by catastrophe is an academic urban legend proposing that if some particular catastrophic event occurs, students whose performance could have been affected by the event are automatically awarded passing grades, on the grounds that there would then be no way to assess them fairly and they should not be penalized for the catastrophe.

== Examples of the legend ==
- If someone dies during an exam, all the other students present pass.
- If a natural disaster occurs during an exam, all students present pass.
- If a university burns down or is destroyed otherwise, all current students immediately graduate with a bachelor's degree.
- A student who gets hit by a campus shuttle bus will receive free tuition.

The most common version of this story is that if a student's roommate commits suicide, the surviving student will be awarded straight As for that semester. This version provides the premise for the films Dead Man on Campus and The Curve, as well as episodes of several television series.

In his book Curses! Broiled Again!, urban legend expert Jan Harold Brunvand investigated the claim that a student whose roommate commits suicide will receive straight As for that semester. He could not find any college or university which actually had such a rule. Sociologist William S. Fox described this legend and variants, such as the rule applying to any death of a roommate; he also concluded that the claim has no basis in fact. The website Snopes rates the story as false, and says that the rumor appears to date from the mid-1970s.

== In practice ==
Many schools and jurisdictions, while not adopting any blanket rule as claimed by the legend, may make allowances or adjustments for individual students in cases of hardship. In the United Kingdom, the Joint Council for Qualifications allows candidates to apply for an adjustment of their score (up to 5%) if they have met all the qualifications for the exam but experience "temporary illness, temporary injury or other indisposition at the time of the assessment". If an eligible candidate dies before completing the examination, an "honorary certificate" can be requested; however, it has no academic value.

In Victoria, Australia, a student takes the GAT midway through the year. If an event happens that affects their performance in the final exams, their results will be derived from their coursework marks and the marks they received on the GAT.

On 12 November 2019, Hong Kong police raided and seriously damaged the Chinese University of Hong Kong. The university management team thus announced a premature end of semester two weeks early. All students could proceed to the next semester for online classes, and arrangements would be made for evaluating their work in the shortened semester.

Beginning on December 31, 2019, some students in the United States of America and Canada advocated for various forms of pass by catastrophe due to the COVID-19 pandemic. In response, numerous universities and pre-secondary institutions adopted a pass/fail system as opposed to letter grades.

On December 14, 2025, the day after the 2025 Brown University shooting, Brown University canceled most in-person final examinations and announced that students will have the opportunity to be graded based on their coursework submitted prior to the shooting; elect for a satisfactory/no credit (pass/fail) grade; or to complete projects, take-home exams, or final papers by January 7, 2026, for either a letter grade or "the revised S/NC option."
