= How to Become Clairvoyant =

Studio album by Robbie Robertson
- Released: April 5, 2011
- Recorded: 2011
- Studio: The Village Recorder (West Los Angeles, California); Olympic Studios (London, England)
- Genre: Rock
- Length: 59:09
- Label: Macrobiotic Records, 429 Records
- Producer: Marius de Vries, Robbie Robertson

Robbie Robertson chronology
Contact from the Underworld of Redboy (1998)	How to Become Clairvoyant (2011)	Sinematic (2019)

How to Become Clairvoyant is the fifth solo release from Canadian singer-musician Robbie Robertson. It was released on April 5, 2011, and peaked at No. 13 on the US Billboard 200 albums chart. Critical reviews were generally positive.

The album features guests Eric Clapton (on tracks 3–8 and 10), Steve Winwood, Trent Reznor (who provided textures on the track "Madame X"), Tom Morello, Robert Randolph, Rocco DeLuca, Angela McCluskey, and Taylor Goldsmith of Dawes. Bassist Pino Palladino, keyboardist Martin Pradler and drummer Ian Thomas are the rhythm section on most songs.

Robertson performed "He Don't Live Here No More" on CBS's Late Show with David Letterman and ABC's The View in support of the album, with the band Dawes.

== Reception ==
Greil Marcus wrote in 2017 that How to Become Clairvoyant was "by far Robbie’s best solo album. There’s a directness, a forthrightness, to the singing and the songwriting, and an absence of clutter in the music."

David Fricke of Rolling Stone called it "a return to the ambitious aural cinema and textural explorations of 1987’s Robbie Robertson and 1991’s Storyville" and wrote that "it is fitting that Eric Clapton, who once aspired to join the Band, sings and plays on half of this record. His and Robertson’s grizzled vocals and pointillist guitar exchanges in 'The Right Mistake' and 'Fear of Falling' are sublime roughage, the sound of two men with shared roots still moving forward."

Thom Jurek of AllMusic gave the album mixed praise, writing that it was a "sometimes compelling record, but it's a flawed one, too, with moments of beauty countered by bloated lyrical and production excesses. Ultimately, it feels as much like an exercise in self-justification as it does in personal revelation."

== Track listing ==
All tracks composed by Robbie Robertson; except where indicated

1. "Straight Down the Line" – 5:19
2. "When the Night Was Young" – 5:05
3. "He Don't Live Here No More" – 5:46
4. "The Right Mistake" – 4:30
5. "This Is Where I Get Off" – 5:09
6. "Fear of Falling" (Eric Clapton, Robertson) – 5:18
7. "She's Not Mine" – 4:28
8. "Madame X" (Eric Clapton) – 4:46
9. "Axman" – 4:36
10. "Won't Be Back" (Eric Clapton, Robertson) – 4:10
11. "How to Become Clairvoyant" – 6:17
12. "Tango for Django" (Robertson, Marius de Vries) – 3:50

Deluxe Edition Bonus Tracks

1. "The Right Mistake" (Songwriter Version)
2. "He Don't Live Here No More" (Songwriter Version)
3. "Fear Of Falling" (Songwriter Version) (Eric Clapton, Robbie Robertson)
4. "This Is Where I Get Off" (Songwriter Version)
5. "Madame X" (Songwriter Version) (Eric Clapton)
6. "Houdini"

Super Deluxe Edition Bonus Tracks

1. "In The War Zone"
2. "The Magician (Houdini)"
3. "Madame X" (Songwriter Version) (Eric Clapton)
4. "The Right Mistake" (Songwriter Version)
5. "This Is Where I Get Off" (Songwriter Version)
6. "She's Not Mine" (Alternate Version)
7. "Fear Of Falling" (Songwriter Version) (Eric Clapton, Robbie Robertson)
8. "Catwalk"
9. "He Don't Live Here No More" (Songwriter Version)
10. "Won't Be Back" (Songwriter Version) (Eric Clapton, Robbie Robertson)

== Personnel ==
- Robbie Robertson – guitar, electric guitar, gut-string guitar, keyboards, vocals
- Angelyna Martinez-Boyd – backing vocals
- Ann Marie Calhoun – violin
- Eric Clapton – acoustic and electric guitar, gut-string guitar, slide guitar, vocal harmony, backing vocals
- Marius de Vries – keyboards, piano
- Rocco DeLuca – dobro, backing vocals
- Bill Dillon – guitar, guitorgan
- Jimi Englund – percussion
- Dana Glover – backing vocals
- Taylor Goldsmith – backing vocals
- Eldad Guetta – horn
- Tina Guo – cello
- Michelle John – backing vocals
- Daryl Johnson – backing vocals
- Jim Keltner – drums
- Frank Marocco – accordion
- Angela McCluskey – vocals
- Natalie Mendoza – backing vocals
- Tom Morello – guitar
- Pino Palladino – bass
- Martin Pradler – Wurlitzer piano
- Robert Randolph – pedal steel guitar
- Ian Thomas – drums
- Sharon White – backing vocals
- Steve Winwood – organ
