= Shark (musician) =

- Born: David Sharkey Shaw
- Origin: Los Angeles, California, U.S.
- Genres: Americana; country; alternative country; alternative rock; folk rock
- Occupations: Musician; singer; songwriter; record producer; disc jockey; radio host
- Instruments: Vocals; guitar; keyboards; drums; percussion
- Years active: 1989–present
- Labels: MCA; DGC; Universal; Chromatic; Magnetic Memories
- Website: SharkandCo.com

David Sharkey Shaw, known professionally as Shark, is an American musician, film composer, radio host, and founding member and guitarist for the American alternative band Wild Colonials. He also records under the name Shark and Co.. The name Sharkey is an Anglicised form of the Gaelic "O'Searcaigh", composed of the elements "O", male descendant of, with "Searcach", a byname meaning "beloved". The name originated in County Tyrone, and is now to be found located in considerable numbers in various parts of Northern Ireland.

== Career ==
=== Big Bam Boo ===
Shark was one-half of the duo Big Bam Boo, that released one album, Fun, Faith, & Fairplay, on MCA Records (Uni Records in US) in 1989. Three singles were released from the album. One single, "Shooting From My Heart", was a Top 40 hit in Canada and entered the UK singles chart on 28 January 1989 and reached number 61; it was in the chart for two weeks.
An unreleased second album was released digitally in 2008 as The New York Tapes.

=== Wild Colonials ===
Shark founded the alternative rock group Wild Colonials in Los Angeles in 1992, with Angela McCluskey, Paul Cantelon, Scott Roewe, and Ian Bernard. The group released three albums between 1994 and 2000. Their most recent release, an EP titled Life as We Know It, was released in 2007. The band toured internationally, both as a supporting act and as a headliner.

=== Film scoring ===
Shark composed the scores for a number of films, starting with I Shot a Man in Vegas in 1995 and then for Me & Will in 1999, The Spreading Ground in 2000, Frozen Stars in 2003, and 2006's How to Go Out on a Date in Queens. He has also made brief appearances and performed off-screen roles in films including a radio disc jockey's voice in I Shot a Man in Vegas and How to Go Out on a Date in Queens.

=== Solo work ===
In November 2008, a cover version of Peter Gabriel's duet with Kate Bush, "Don't Give Up" was released with Dead Rock West singer Cindy Wasserman.
A cover of Pink Floyd's "High Hopes" appears on the 2003 tribute album A Fair Forgery of Pink Floyd.

The Shark/Scardanelli penned song "Save Your Dreams" has been covered by nine different artists including gospel act David C. Clarke and The Dynaires and Canadian country singer Justine Stewart, who performed the song at the 2006 World AIDS Day Concert in Beijing, China. The Central China Television (CCTV) primetime special aired throughout Asia and Europe.

=== DJ Shark ===
Shark also appears as DJ Shark, DJing film premieres and other events including ESPN's 2004 Super Bowl party in Houston, The Sopranos private Emmy party and the premiere party for the TV movie Their Eyes Were Watching God.

DJ Shark's remix of Rae & Christian's remix of Dinah Washington's "Is You Is or Is You Ain't My Baby" appeared in the Michael Douglas film It Runs in the Family.

=== All Time is Now ===
DJ Shark hosts a weekly two-hour radio show, "All Time is Now" which premiered on July 15, 2011, on the Los Angeles radio station Indie 103.1. The multi-format music featured on the show is connected to events, record release dates, #1 chart placings, birthdays, classic gigs etc. that occurred that week but in different years. The debut show kicked off with The Rolling Stones song, "Happy" which came out that week, July 15, 1972.

The show airs live every Sunday from 5:00pm till 7:00pm Pacific Standard Time and rebroadcast every Wednesday at midnight till 2am to an international audience online.

== Discography ==
=== Solo releases ===
- "Don't Give Up" single – Shark and Co. with Cindy Wasserman (2008, Magnetic Memories)
- "Don't Give Up" (Special Mix) single – Shark and Co. with Cindy Wasserman (2010, Magnetic Memories) Europe only release
- "Secret Santa" single – Shark and Co. (2014, Magnetic Memories Recording Co.)
- "Dog Park (from The Bandit Hound)" single – Shark and Co. (2016, Magnetic Memories Recording Co.)

=== Movie soundtracks ===
- Dead Man's Curve/The Curve soundtrack (1999, Chromatic)
- Dead Man's Curve/The Curve – song based soundtrack (1999, Toho) (song: "Theme from Dead Man's Curve" (Edit)) Japan only
- Frozen Stars soundtrack (2004, The Orchard) (song: "Love Theme from Frozen Stars")

These soundtracks were not released separately from the films.

- I Shot a Man in Vegas (1995)

The main theme from the film, "Route 15 4:30AM" appeared on the Wild Colonials album Reel Life Vol. 1.

- How to Go Out on a Date in Queens (2006)

At the opening night of the film in Los Angeles, a 14 track soundtrack album was given out to the audience as they left. Album included songs from various artists and three score pieces from composer Shark. The album has never been formally released.

=== Compilation appearances ===
- A Fair Forgery of Pink Floyd (2003, Stanley) (as Shark 'n the Smoke) (song: "High Hopes")

=== with Big Bam Boo ===
- Fun, Faith, & Fairplay (1989)

=== with Wild Colonials ===
- Fruit of Life (1994, DGC/Geffen)
- This Can’t Be Life (1996, DGC/Geffen)
- Reel Life vol 1 (2000, Chromatic)
- Life As We Know It EP 1/4 (2007, Hip-O)

== Filmography ==
- I Shot a Man in Vegas (1995)
- Dead Man's Curve/The Curve (1998)
- Me and Will (1999)
- The Spreading Ground (2000)
- The Yard Sale (2002)
- Frozen Stars (2003)
- How to Go Out on a Date in Queens (2006)
