= Télépopmusik =

French electronic music duo

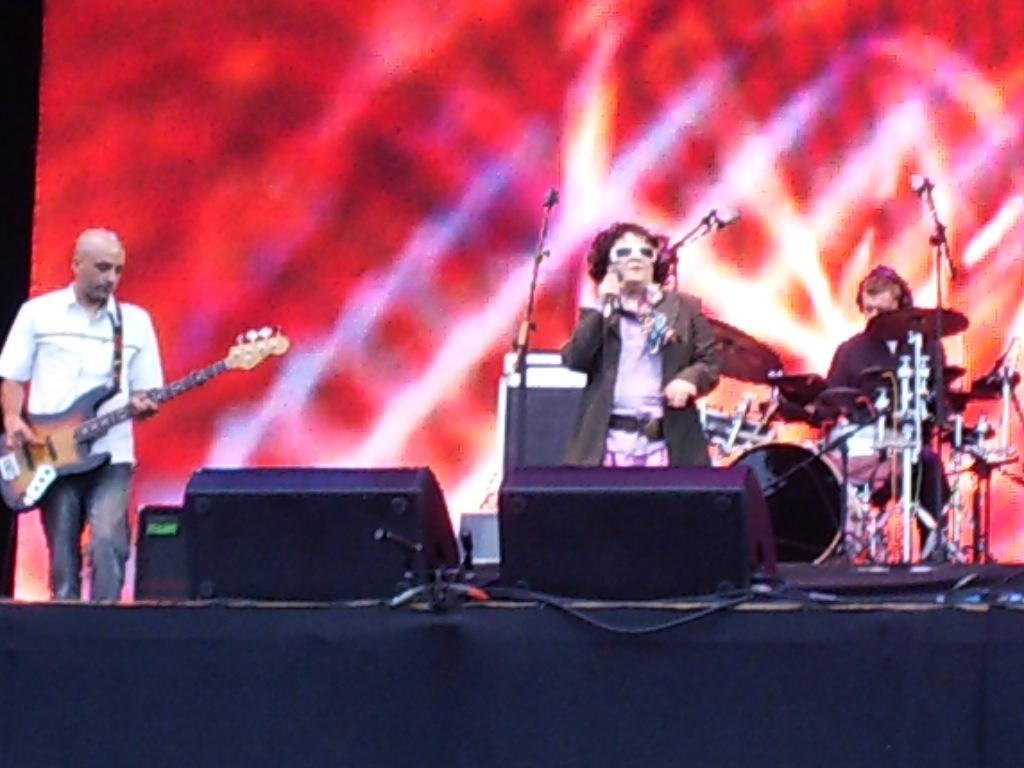

Background information
- Origin: France
- Genres: House, downtempo, electronic
- Years active: 1996–present
- Label: EMI/Capitol Records
- Members: Fabrice Dumont; Stephan Haeri; Christophe Hetier

Télépopmusik is a French electronic music trio, composed of Fabrice Dumont (bassist of the pop band Autour de Lucie), Stephan Haeri (also known as "2 square" for his solo projects), and Christophe Hetier (also known as "DJ Antipop").

== History ==
Télépopmusik was formed by Fabrice Dumont (of Autour de Lucie), Stephan Haeri (2Square, of Planet Zen), and Christophe Hetier (Antipop, of Bel Air) in 1997.

=== 1997: Sonic 75 ===
Télépopmusik, contributed "Sonic 75" to the compilation Source Lab 3 X (1997).

=== 2001–2004: Genetic World ===
The group's first album, Genetic World was released in 2001; several singles from the album were released subsequently.

Rapper Mau, from Earthling, appeared as a guest vocalist on Genetic World as Soda-Pop (tracks "Genetic World", "Da Hoola" and "Trishika").

"Breathe" from Genetic World was nominated for a 2004 Grammy Award in the Best Dance Recording category. The track peaked at No. 42 on the UK Singles Chart in March 2002. Angela McCluskey, co-writer and guest vocalist on "Breathe", was a member of the band Wild Colonials.

The track "Love Can Damage Your Health" gained popularity in the house music genre as a result of a remix by DJ/producer Dennis Ferrer and Abicah Soul.

=== 2005: Angel Milk ===
In 2005, the group released their second studio album, Angel Milk. The album received positive reviews from critics, and spawned the single "Into Everything"; its accompanying music video featured stop-motion animation and footage of a house full of leaves.

Rapper Mau appeared as a guest vocalist as Mau ("Anyway", "Last Train to Wherever", "Hollywood on My Toothpaste", "Tuesday" and "15 Minutes").

=== 2013: Try Me Anyway / Fever ===
On 24 June 2013, Télépopmusik released the Try Me Anyway / Fever EP, which featured New York-based vocalist Betty Black (Sylvia Gordon) and remixes from Dirty Channels, Zombie Disco Squad, Populette, Pit Spector and Pino Rastovitch.

=== 2020: Everybody Breaks the Line ===
In September 2020, they released Everybody Breaks the Line, fifteen years after the release of their second album. Featured artists include Young & Sick, Jo Wedin, Sylvia Black, and frequent collaborator Angela McCluskey.

== Discography ==
Breathe
"Breathe" by Télépopmusik from the Genetic World album.

- Sonic 75 (1997)

=== Albums ===
- Genetic World (2001)
- Angel Milk (2005)
- Everybody Breaks the Line (2020)

=== Extended plays ===
- Ghost Girl (2009)
- Try Me Anyway / Fever (2013)
- Sound (2014)

=== Remix compilation ===
- Catalogue of Telepopmusik (2003)

=== As producer ===
- Damita Jo by Janet Jackson (2004) (Télépopmusik produced "Looking for Love", the introduction to this album)

=== In sampling ===
- "Breathe on My Contacts" by Jennifer Lee a.k.a. TOKiMONSTA samples "Breathe" (2011)
- "5am Ant Hat" by Krayze Music samples "Love Can Damage Your Health" (2012)
