= Breathe (Télépopmusik song) =

2002 single by Télépopmusik

Single by Télépopmusik featuring Angela McCluskey

from the album Genetic World
- Released: 18 February 2002
- Length: 4:38
- Label: EMI; Catalogue
- Songwriters: Angela McCluskey; Stephan Haeri; Fabrice Dumont

Télépopmusik singles chronology
| "Breathe" (2002) | "Love Can Damage Your Health" (2002) |

"Breathe" is a song by French dance music group Télépopmusik. It features guest vocals by Scottish singer Angela McCluskey and appears on the group's 2001 album, Genetic World. Released as the group's debut single in 2002, "Breathe" reached No. 42 on the UK Singles Chart in March of that year. The single was released in the US later that year, peaking at number 78 on the Billboard Hot 100 and number nine on the Billboard Dance Club Play chart.

== Reception ==
=== Critical ===
The song "Breathe" was reviewed favorably by Chris Long at the BBC, who described Angela McCluskey's vocals as "breathless" and said the single was "a deliciously silky track that lolls by a holiday pool and enjoys the sunshine." AllMusic felt that the song was one of the highlights of Genetic World, the song's parent album.

=== Commercial ===
The song was the group's commercial breakthrough, charting in both the UK and the US. "Breathe" reached number 42 on the UK Singles Chart dated 2 March 2002. The song peaked at number 78 on the Billboard Hot 100, spending two months on the tally. On the Hot Dance Club Play chart, the song was a top-10 hit, peaking at number 9. The song also reached number 31 on the Rhythmic Songs chart.

== Accolades ==
"Breathe" was nominated for a Grammy Award in the category Best Dance Recording at the ceremony held in February 2004, eventually losing out to "Come into My World" by Kylie Minogue. In 2014, Bustle selected the song as the "Best Song You Forgot About" from Now That's What I Call Music! 12, deeming it "dreamy" and "delightful".

== Music video ==
The music video for "Breathe" was shot in Hollywood, Los Angeles in 2001. It was directed by Jordan Scott (daughter of movie director Ridley Scott), who was 24 at the time. The video features several people gathered by a pool. A man looks bemused before laying down. A Monarch butterfly flies over him. As he grabs it in his hand, a child watches him nearby, angering the child. The man falls asleep as the child walks over. The child appears to have a mechanical “compartment” on her back. His dreams consist of moving shots within an underground train and of wheat fields (similar to those on the Genetic World cover). The child looks to an older woman for approval, before pouring “glitter” into a glass of water. She wakes the man and hands him the glass of water. The man drinks while she smiles maliciously, before the man faints. The video is mostly in slow-motion. The video was nominated for Electronic Music Video of the Year at the 2003 Music Video Production Association Awards.

== Use in media ==
"Breathe" was featured in an advertising campaign by the automobile company Mitsubishi in 2003 to promote its Outlander model, and in the UK by Peugeot in 2002 to promote the 307. "Breathe" was also featured in the advertising campaign by Visa Europe in their "Love Every Day" campaign. In television, the song featured in season 9, episode 20 of Friends “The One With The Soap Opera Party” in 2003. In 2013, indie pop band New Navy covered the song; their version was featured on the compilation album Majestic Casual: Chapter 1.

== Track listings ==
EMI maxi-single (5502552)
| No. | Title | Length |
|---|---|---|
| 1. | "Breathe (Extended Mix)" | 7:16 |
| 2. | "Breathe (Jori Hulkkonen Remix)" | 6:22 |
| 3. | "Breathe (Markus Nikolai's Thinking Of S.D.C. Mix)" | 7:03 |
| 4. | "Breathe (Scratch Massive Attack On Breathe)" | 6:30 |

EMI French maxi-single (724355077424)
| No. | Title | Length |
|---|---|---|
| 1. | "Breathe (Extended Mix)" | 7:16 |
| 2. | "Breathe (Jori Hulkkonen Remix)" | 6:22 |
| 3. | "Breathe (Markus Nikolai's Thinking Of S.D.C. Mix)" | 7:03 |
| 4. | "Breathe (Scratch Massive Attack On Breathe)" | 6:29 |
| 5. | "Breathe (New Extended Mix)" | 5:54 |

Enhanced Chrysalis CD single
| No. | Title | Length |
|---|---|---|
| 1. | "Breathe (Radio Mix)" (Music video) | 3:13 |
| 2. | "Breathe (Jori Hulkkonen Remix)" | 6:21 |
| 3. | "Breathe (New Extended Mix)" | 6:02 |
| 4. | "Breathe (Enhanced Video)" | 3:13 |

== Charts ==
| Chart (2002–2003) | Peak position |
|---|---|
| Italy (FIMI) | 31 |
| Scottish Singles Sales (Official Charts) | 49 |
| UK Singles (Official Charts) | 42 |
| US Billboard Hot 100 | 78 |
| US Dance Airplay (Billboard) | 21 |
| US Dance Club Songs (Billboard) | 9 |
| US Dance Singles Sales (Billboard) | 12 |
| US Rhythmic Airplay (Billboard) | 31 |

== Release history ==
| Region | Date | Format(s) | Label(s) | Ref(s). |
|---|---|---|---|---|
| United Kingdom | 18 February 2002 | 12-inch vinyl; CD; DVD | Chrysalis | |
| Australia | 11 March 2002 | CD | EMI; Catalogue | |
| United States | 29 April 2002 | Triple A radio | Capitol | |
| United States | 21 January 2003 | Contemporary hit; hot AC; triple A radio | Capitol | |
