= Derek Vanlint =

British-Canadian cinematographer and film director

- Born: 7 November 1932; London, England
- Died: 23 February 2010 (aged 77); Toronto, Ontario, Canada
- Other names: Derek VanLint; Derek Van Lint
- Years active: 1965–2000
- Organization: Canadian Society of Cinematographers

Derek Vanlint, C.S.C. (7 November 1932 – 23 February 2010) was a British-born Canadian cinematographer and director of television commercials and motion pictures.

He was best known as the cinematographer for the 1979 science fiction horror film Alien, which earned him a Best Cinematography Award nomination from the British Society of Cinematographers.

== Career ==
Vanlint was primarily a cinematographer and director of television commercials. Highly prolific, he produced advertisements and short films for clients like Guinness Brewery, PepsiCo, and British Airways. He was a member of the Ridley Scott Associates, a commercial and film production company based in London, England.

He served as director of photography on Scott's 1979 science fiction horror film Alien. Vanlint worked closely with Scott to help construct the look and style of the film, utilizing in-camera lighting and working in conjunction with the art department to construct sets and lighting specifically to achieve Scott's intended imagery. The film contained numerous visual effects shots utilizing scale models composited into rendered backgrounds. Vanlint's work on the film was critically acclaimed, and he earned nomination for a BSC Award for Best Cinematography.

Vanlint served as cinematographer on the 1981 fantasy-adventure film Dragonslayer. Like Alien, the film utilized numerous effects shots, this time achieved with stop motion. Vanlint was initially approached by Scott to shoot his follow-up film Blade Runner, but he turned the offer down and was replaced by Jordan Cronenweth. Director James Cameron asked Vanlint to film Alien's 1986 sequel, but Vanlint instead recommended his protege Adrian Biddle, who had served as focus puller and camera operator on the original. Until his death in 2010, Vanlint worked almost exclusively on commercials in Canada, though he briefly returned to feature films in the year 2000, handling special effects photography for the X-Men and serving as DP and director on the horror thriller The Spreading Ground, starring Dennis Hopper. The film was entered into the 22nd Moscow International Film Festival.

Vanlint died in Toronto following a short illness on 23 February 2010. He was 77 years old. Throughout his career, he worked on advertisements for such companies as British Airways, Chevrolet, Coca-Cola, General Motors, Guinness, Kellogg's, Levi's, Maxwell House, Pepsi, and Visa.

== Filmography ==
=== Short film ===
Cinematographer

Year	Title	Director	Notes
1966	This Time Tomorrow	Philip Bond	Documentary short (Note: Shared credit with Charles Branigan, Vic Francis, Donald Long and Eric Miller)
1970	Simon, Simon	Graham Stark	With Harvey Harrison
1980	The Bed	Himself	

Director

- Morning, Noon and Night (1967) (Also producer)
- The Bed (1980)

=== Feature film ===
Year	Title	Director
1979	Alien	Ridley Scott
1981	Dragonslayer	Matthew Robbins
2000	The Spreading Ground	Himself
