= Paul Cantelon =

American classical composer

Paul Cantelon (born December 25, 1959) is an American contemporary classical music and popular music composer, a film score composer and an actor. He is also a violinist, pianist, and accordionist, and a founding member of the American alternative band Wild Colonials.

== Background ==
Cantelon was born in Glendale, California. He was a music prodigy who made his violin debut at the age of 13 at UCLA's Royce Hall. Inspired by the work of Donalee Reubenet, he started piano studies. He studied with Andre Gauthier at the Geneva Conservatory of Music in Switzerland, Jacob Lateiner at the Juilliard School of Music in New York City, and Vlado Perlemuter at the Conservatoire de Paris.

== Music ==
Over the course of his career, he has released a number of solo classical piano recordings, including the following:

- In the Morning Early (a collection of Celtic hymns) (1978)
- Paul Cantelon Solo Piano
- A Modern Day Mozart (1998)
- Nightwood, 24 Preludes for Solo Piano
- Point No Point (2001)
- 'Repose' (2020)
- 'Sanctuary' (2021)

He is a founding member of the American alternative band Wild Colonials, in which he plays violin, piano, and accordion, and has featured on their albums...

- Fruit of Life (1994)
- This Can’t Be Life (1996)
- Reel Life vol 1 (2000)
- Life As We Know It EP 1/4 (2007)

Since the 1990s, he has also recorded and performed with a diverse range of artists including Yo Yo Ma, Joe Cocker, The Kinks, Red Hot Chili Peppers, George Clinton, King Crimson, Everclear, and Ry Cooder. He has guested on Perla Betalla's debut album, Lili Haydn's Lili, Loup Garou's Dobb's Ferry, and Sara Sant'Ambrogio's Dreaming.

In the 1990s and early 2000s, he played piano in a jazz-inflected group that also featured Lili Haydn on violin, Martin Tillman on cello, and Satnam Singh Ramgotra on tablas. They released a self-titled CD under the name Luciana's Wish. In 2000, under the name Tryptich, they released an album of cover songs called Curio, with vocals by Angela McCluskey.

== Music for film ==
In recent years, he is perhaps best known for his compositions for films, which include the following:

- Olympia (2019)
- At Eternity's Gate (co-composer, 2018)
- Jane Fonda in Five Acts (2018)
- The Visit (2015) ("epilogue theme")
- Wish You Well (2013)
- Violet and Daisy (2013)
- Firelight (2012)
- The Music Never Stopped (2011)
- New York, I Love You (2010)
- Conviction (2010)
- W. (2008)
- The Other Boleyn Girl (2008)
- The Diving Bell & The Butterfly (2007)
- Superheroes (2007)
- Year of the Fish (2007)
- Everything is Illuminated (2005)
- The Swimmers (2005)
- Kill Your Darlings (2004)
- Issaquena (2002)

In addition, he composed a special centenary score for The Battleship Potemkin in 1995.

== Personal life ==
Cantelon's mother was a trumpeter in the Philadelphia Symphony, and his father was an evangelistpreacher. His brother is the multi-talented photographer/artist/writer/musician/activist, Lee Cantelon.

At age 17, Cantelon had a serious bicycle accident which left him in a coma. When he emerged from the coma a month later, he had significant amnesia. As a result, he had to relearn his musical skills.

Cantelon is married to Wild Colonials vocalist, Angela McCluskey. When they were in their early 20s, they met in London at the Star of India, where he was playing, and she was dining with British actor Hugh Grant. McCluskey died following surgery for an arterial tear, on 14 March 2024, at the age of 64.
