= Curio (band) =

Japanese pop rock band

- Origin: Kansai, Japan
- Genres: Pop rock; ska punk
- Years active: 1995–2003
- Labels: Epic Records Japan; Sony Music Direct; Warner Music Japan
- Members: Nob; Kassai; Britain
- Past members: Aja

Curio (stylized as CURIO) was a Japanese pop rock band formed in 1995. They were best known to Western audiences for their song "Kimi ni Fureru Dake de", which was used as the fourth opening theme for the popular anime Rurouni Kenshin.

== Members ==
Nob - Vocals, Saxophone

Born October 26, 1973. Following the dissolution of Curio, Nob has appeared as a guest vocalist with the ska band Ska-Show. He was arrested in 2000 for methamphetamine use.

Kassai - Guitarist

Currently working in Okinawa as a graphic designer with the 3PO Design Workshop.

Britain - Drummer, Programming

=== Former Members ===
Aja - Guitarist

Left the band in 2001. Following this, he joined the ska band One Track Mind as a guitarist.

== Discography ==
=== Maxi Singles ===
- Go Around The World - August 21, 2002
- Clover - October 17, 2002
- Blanket - October 29, 2003

=== Albums ===
- Hybrid - August 21, 1997 (re-released April 25, 2007)
- Sweet & Bitter - July 29, 1998 (re-released April 25, 2007)
- Pawky - July 28, 1999 (re-released April 25, 2007)
- Raison d'etre - December 21, 2001
- Glitters - November 7, 2002
- Best Bang! (Best Album) - December 18, 2002
