= Wild Colonials =

US musical group

- Origin: Los Angeles, California, U.S.
- Genres: Alternative rock; folk rock; jazz rock
- Years active: 1992–present
- Labels: Geffen; DGC; Chromatic; WLPS
- Members: Shark; Paul Cantelon; Scott Roewe
- Past members: Angela McCluskey; Ian Bernard; Joel Virgel Vierset; Thaddeus Corea; Jason Payne; Skip Ward
- Website: www.wildcolonials.net

Wild Colonials is an American alternative rock band formed in 1992, in Los Angeles, California, by Angela McCluskey (vocals), Shark (guitar/vocals/percussion), Paul Cantelon (violin/piano), Scott Roewe (multi-instrumentalist) and Ian Bernard (drums/percussion). After 1993 members included Thaddeus Corea and Jason Payne on drums/percussion and Skip Ward on bass.

== Biography ==
Formed in early 1992, as an impromptu jam session at an Irish coffee house in Hollywood, called Café Beckett. Singer Angela McCluskey had gathered together a group of fellow musicians to arrange a “musical evening” to showcase her friend/guitarist Shark, who had recently relocated to Los Angeles from New York. Brought aboard were Paul Cantelon, on violin and piano; Scott Roewe, on bass, keyboards, and saxophone; and Ian Bernard (drums/percussion) and other revolving special guests. The “musical evening” evolved into a regular gig from the group soon to be known as Wild Colonials - named after the Irish song “Wild Colonial Boy.” Also joining in with the ever changing lineup of guests included Dave King (Flogging Molly), Vivian Campbell (Def Leppard), and several members of the Hothouse Flowers and Leonard Cohen's touring band.

From Café Beckett, the group developed a large following, performing regularly at Molly Malone's, an Irish pub in Los Angeles, and then moving to Café Largo a larger venue in West Hollywood. With a Tuesday night residency that lasted several months, the Wild Colonials landed a record deal with DGC/Geffen Records. Fruit of Life (1994) and This Can’t Be Life (1996) were both released to critical acclaim, landing the group as the second stage headliner on the prestigious Lilith Fair lineup in 1997. Over that time, Wild Colonials–either as a group or as individual artists - have performed music for several films- a collection of unreleased tracks, soundtrack only tracks and score cues was collected to make up their third album "Reel Life vol 1" (2000) (released through indie label Chromatic Records).

The band's fourth album was intended to be released as four separate EPs under the umbrella name Life As We Know It (UMe/Universal). To date only EP 1/4 has been released. Life As We Know It EP 2/4 (WLPS) was announced for release in the summer of 2025.

The band members have a number of connections to other celebrities and musicians: Thaddeus Corea is the son of pianist/composer Chick Corea, violinist Paul Cantelon is the brother-in-law of American singer Rickie Lee Jones, and vocalist Angela McCluskey is British singer Lily Allen's Godmother.

== Music in film ==
Wild Colonials music has appeared in over thirty different films from Disney's Mr. Wrong, to the quirky Indie sensation Flirting with Disaster and the Sundance Film Festival hit Dead Man's Curve. Three members of the band, Shark, Paul Cantelon and Scott Roewe have all scored feature-length films.

- The songs 'Wake Up Sad" and "Blue" appeared in the movie The Curve and the film Anarchy TV.
- The song "Victim" appeared in the movie The Last Supper (1995 film) and the short film The Yard Sale.
- The Wild Colonials version of Tom Jones' "It's Not Unusual" appeared in the movie "Mr. Wrong"
- The song "This Misery" appeared in the movie Unhook The Stars
- The song "RollerCoaster" appeared in the movie "I'll Take You There".
- The song "Love®" appeared in the movie "Cosa Bella".
- The Wild Colonials version of Leonard Cohen's "Dance Me To The End Of Love" appeared in the movie Chromophobia
- The song "Cure" appears in the television movie Cabin by the Lake and its sequel.
- The songs "Rainbow" and "If By Chance" (a duet with Cyndi Lauper) appears in the movie soundtrack for "Southie".
- The song "Heaven & Hell 2010" appears in the movie "Conviction".

== Discography ==
- Fruit of Life (1994)
- This Can't Be Life (1996)
- Reel Life vol. 1 (2000)
- Life As We Know It - EP 1/4 (2007)
- Life As We Know It - EP 2/4 upcoming (2025)

== Awards ==
Vocalist Angela McCluskey as co-writer/guest vocalist with French Electronica band Télépopmusik was nominated for the 2004 Grammy Award for Best Dance Recording for the International hit "Breathe". The Grammy went to Kylie Minogue for "Come Into My World".
