= The Get Up Kids discography =

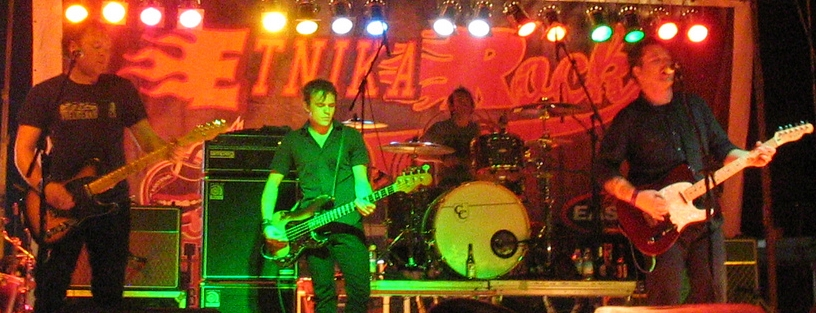
- The Get Up Kids performing live in 2009
- Studio albums: 6
- Extended plays: 7
- Live albums: 1
- Singles: 5
- Music videos: 5

The discography of The Get Up Kids, an American rock band that formed in 1995, consists of six studio albums, five singles, one live album and seven extended plays.

Shortly after forming in their hometown of Kansas City, Missouri, the band signed to Doghouse Records and released their first EP, Woodson, along with their debut full-length studio album Four Minute Mile (1997). After the success of their first album, the band was picked up by then-underground label Vagrant Records, where they recorded Red Letter Day, their second EP, followed by their second album Something to Write Home About. The album was a massive success, selling 134,000 copies in its first three years of release in the US. They supported the album for three years with tours and two singles; "Ten Minutes" and "Action & Action". In order to capitalize on the success of the album, Vagrant released Eudora, a compilation of b-sides, covers and rarities in 2001.

In 2002, they released their third studio album On a Wire. The album was a large departure from their previous sound, and was considered a commercial failure. In 2004, they released their fourth album Guilt Show to better critical reception. A year later, they released Live! @ The Granada Theater, the band's first and only live album. Later that year, the band broke up after one final tour. However, in 2008 the band reunited, and announced a reunion tour for 2009 to coincide with a tenth-anniversary re-release of Something to Write Home About.

== Albums ==
=== Studio albums ===
Title	Details	Peak chart positions	
Title	Details	US	US Indie
Four Minute Mile	Released: September 30, 1997; Label: Doghouse; Format: CD, CS, DL, LP	—	—
Something to Write Home About	Released: September 28, 1999; Label: Vagrant; Format: CD, CD+DVD-V, CS, DL, LP	—	—
On a Wire	Released: May 14, 2002; Label: Vagrant; Format: CD, DL, LP	57	3
Guilt Show	Released: March 2, 2004; Label: Vagrant; Format: CD, DL, LP	58	3
There Are Rules	Released: January 25, 2011; Label: Quality Hill; Format: CD, DL, LP	124	15
Problems	Released: May 10, 2019; Label: Polyvinyl; Format: CD, CS, DL, LP	—	11
"—" denotes releases that did not chart or were not released in that territory.

=== Live albums ===
Title	Details	Peak chart positions
Title	Details	US Indie
Live! @ The Granada Theater	Released: May 24, 2005; Label: Vagrant; Format: CD, DL	26

=== Compilation albums ===
Title	Details	Peak chart positions
Title	Details	US Indie
The EP's: Red Letter Day and Woodson	Released: January 9, 2001; Label: Doghouse; Format: CD, CS, DL, LP	—
Eudora	Released: November 27, 2001; Label: Vagrant; Format: CD, DL, LP	18
"—" denotes releases that did not chart or were not released in that territory.

== Extended plays ==
Title	Details	Peak chart positions	
Title	Details	US	US Indie
Woodson	Released: 1997; Label: Doghouse; Format: CD, 7" vinyl	—	—
Red Letter Day	Released: July 20, 1999; Label: Doghouse; Format: CD, 10" vinyl	—	—
iTunes Sessions EP	Released: March 25, 2004; Label: Vagrant; Format: DL	—	—
Simple Science	Released: April 13, 2010; Label: Simple Psyence; Format: CD, DL, 10" vinyl, 12" vinyl	194	29
Kicker	Released: June 8, 2018; Label: Polyvinyl; Format: CD, DL, 12" vinyl	—	22
"—" denotes releases that did not chart or were not released in that territory.

=== Split extended plays ===
The Get Up Kids are widely considered to be one of the more prominent groups to take part in the second-wave emo movement that took place in the mid-1990s. In their early years, they toured with such influential emo bands as Jimmy Eat World, The Promise Ring and Braid, later touring with such groups as Superchunk, The Anniversary and Hot Rod Circuit. During that time, they often collaborated with other groups, putting out split EPs on 7" vinyl.

Year	Title	Split with	Song featured	Record label
1996	The Get Up Kids / Coalesce	Coalesce	"Burned Bridges"	Second Nature Recordings
1997	Post Marked Stamps No. 4	Braid	"I'm a Loner Dottie, a Rebel"	Tree Records
1999	The Get Up Kids / The Anniversary	The Anniversary	"Central Standard Time"	Vagrant Records
2001	The Get Up Kids / Rocket From the Crypt	Rocket from the Crypt	"Up on the Roof"	Vagrant Records
2004	Devil in the Woods No. 69	Volcano, I'm Still Excited!!	"Wouldn't Believe It" (Live in the Studio)	Devil in the Woods Magazine

== Singles ==
Title	Year	Album
"Shorty"	1996	Non-album singles
"A Newfound Interest in Massachusetts"	1997	Non-album singles
"Ten Minutes"	1999	Non-album singles
"Action & Action"	2000	Something to Write Home About
"Overdue"	2002	On a Wire
"Wouldn't Believe It"	2004	Guilt Show
"Automatic"	2011	There Are Rules
"Rally 'Round the Fool"	2011	There Are Rules
"Maybe"	2018	Kicker (EP)
"Better This Way"	2018	Kicker (EP)
"Satellite"	2019	Problems

== Music videos ==
Title	Year	Director	Album
"Action & Action"	1999	Unknown	Something to Write Home About
"Overdue"	2002	Unknown	On a Wire
"Stay Gone"	2002	Brock Batten, Jonathan Green	On a Wire
"Man of Conviction"	2004	Unknown	Guilt Show
"The One You Want"	2004	Unknown	Guilt Show
"Automatic"	2011	Brendan Costello	There Are Rules
"Shatter Your Lungs"	2011	Adam Rothlein	There Are Rules
"Regent's Court"	2011	Pat Vamos	There Are Rules
"Rally 'Round the Fool"	2011	Pat Vamos	There Are Rules
"I'm Sorry"	2018	Shawn Brackbill	Kicker (EP)

== Other appearances ==
Title	Year	Album
"On with the Show" (Mötley Crüe cover)	1999	I Love Metal
"Alec Eiffel" (Pixies cover)	1999	Where Is My Mind? Tribute to the Pixies
"Close to Me" (The Cure cover)	1999	Before You Were Punk 2
"Newfound Mass (2000)"	2000	The Best Comp in the World
"Impossible Outcomes"	2000	Encapsulated
"Beer for Breakfast" (The Replacements cover)	2000	Another Year on the Streets
"The Lion and the Lamb"	2004	Rock Against Bush, Vol. 1
"Like a Man Possessed"	2004	Another Year on the Streets Vol. 3
