= Free Language Demons / Up On the Roof =

EP by Rocket from the Crypt and The Get Up Kids
- Released: December 2000
- Recorded: Big Fish Studios in San Diego, California; West Beach Recordings in Hollywood, California; Mixed at Inner Ear Studios in Arlington, Virginia
- Genre: Punk rock, emo, indie rock
- Length: 5:18
- Label: Vagrant
- Producer: Rocket From the Crypt; Alex Brahl; The Get Up Kids

The Get Up Kids chronology
| Central Standard Time/Vasil + Bluey (1999) | Free Language Demons / Up On the Roof (2000) | Eudora (2001) |

Rocket From the Crypt chronology
| Cut Carefully and Play Loud (1999) | Free Language Demons / Up On the Roof (2000) | Group Sounds (2001) |

Free Language Demons / Up On the Roof is a split EP between Kansas City, Missouri emo band The Get Up Kids and the San Diego, California punk outfit Rocket From the Crypt. The album was released on colored vinyl in 2000 on Vagrant Records. There were seven different pressings of the album, with each pressing on different colored vinyl. Each song was recorded separately; "Up On The Roof" was recorded at West Beach Recorders in the summer of 1999 while the band was recording their second full-length album Something to Write Home About. "Free Language Demons" was recorded at Big Fish Studios in San Diego, during the recording session for the band's Vagrant Records debut, Group Sounds.

== Track listing ==
Side A – Rocket From the Crypt
| No. | Title | Length |
|---|---|---|
| 1. | "Free Language Demons" | 2:33 |

Side B – The Get Up Kids
| No. | Title | Length |
|---|---|---|
| 1. | "Up On the Roof" | 2:45 |

== Release Info ==
The EP was released on 7" colored vinyl, in four batches; The most widely available was the white vinyl, with 3,000 copies produced. There were also 800 orange copies made, 500 blue copies, and only 300 gray colored records. The Get Up Kids re-released "Up on the Roof" on their B-Sides collection Eudora in 2000.

== Personnel ==
Rocket From the Crypt – Band

- Speedo – guitar, vocals
- Petey X – bass
- Apollo 9 – saxophone
- Atom – drums
- ND – guitar
- JC 2000 – trumpet

Rocket From the Crypt – Production

- Production – Rocket From the Crypt
- Ben Moore – Engineer, Mixing

Other Personnel

- Jeremy Dean – Package Design

The Get Up Kids – Band

- Matt Pryor – Vocals, Guitar
- Jim Suptic – Guitar, Backing Vocals
- Rob Pope – Bass
- Ryan Pope – Drums
- James Dewees – Keyboards

The Get Up Kids – Production

- Alex Brahl – Producer, engineer
- Don Zientara – Additional Engineer (Inner Ear Studios)
- Jay Gordon – Additional Engineer (West Beach Studios)
