= Shorty (song) =

Single by The Get Up Kids
- B-side: "The Breathing Method"
- Released: 1996
- Genre: Emo
- Length: 8:10
- Label: Huey Proudhon Records
- Songwriter(s): Rob Pope; Ryan Pope; Matt Pryor; Jim Suptic
- Producer(s): The Get Up Kids

The Get Up Kids singles chronology
"Shorty" (1996)	"'A Newfound Interest in Massachusetts'" (1997)

"Shorty" is a song by American rock band the Get Up Kids. The single was self-funded, and was a major catalyst for the band's early success, gaining the attention of several record labels including the band's future label Doghouse Records.

== History ==
In 1995, after the band first formed, Matt Pryor and Rob Pope saved for several months in order to record their first 7". In 1996, they recorded the record, produced by Mike Mogis of Bright Eyes, and his brother A.J., who were major players in the midwest emo scene at the time. The release of the record brought a great deal of attention to the band from several labels including Contrast Records, Doghouse Records and Slash Records, an imprint of Elektra Records. However, the band didn't want to sign to a major label too early, so they instead signed to Doghouse Records, who gave them a two-album deal and $4,000 to record their first album. The release also got the attention of producer Ed Rose, who went on to produce their EP Woodson, the band's first release on a major label.

"Shorty" also caused a good deal of shakeup within the band. After the release brought attention to the band, they decided that they wanted to start touring. However, drummer Nathan Shay wanted to focus on his schooling at the Kansas City Art Institute, which eventually led to him quitting the band. He was soon replaced by Rob's brother Ryan Pope.

== Track listing ==
All tracks are written by The Get Up Kids.

Side A
No.	Title	Length
1.	"Shorty"	3:25

Side B
No.	Title	Length
1.	"The Breathing Method"	4:45

== Additional Releases ==
- The song "Shorty" was re-recorded for the band's debut album Four Minute Mile, released in its original format on the B-sides and rarities collection Eudora, and on their live album Live! @ The Granada Theater.
- The song "The Breathing Method" was re-released on the band's B-sides and rarities collection Eudora.

== Personnel ==
Band

- Matt Pryor - Vocals, guitar
- Jim Suptic - Guitar, backing vocals
- Rob Pope - Bass
- Nathan Shay - Drums, backing vocals ("The Breathing Method")

Production

- Mike Mogis - Production
- A.J. - Production, mixing
