= Ten Minutes (The Get Up Kids song) =

Single by the Get Up Kids
- B-side: "Anne Arbour"
- Released: 1999
- Genre: Emo
- Length: 6:35
- Label: Sub Pop
- Songwriter(s): James Dewees; Rob Pope; Ryan Pope; Matt Pryor; Jim Suptic
- Producer(s): the Get Up Kids

The Get Up Kids singles chronology
"A Newfound Interest in Massachusetts" (1997)	"Ten Minutes" (1999)	"Action & Action" (2000)

"Ten Minutes" is a song by the Get Up Kids. The single was released as part of the Sub Pop Records Singles Club. 1300 pressings were black, with only 100 pressings of the single on clear vinyl. A re-recorded version of it appears on their album Something to Write Home About. On July 2, 2005 The Get Up Kids performed for the last time before their hiatus at the Uptown Theater in Kansas City, MO. "Ten Minutes" was the last song they played.

== Track listing ==
All tracks are written by The Get Up Kids

Side A
No.	Title	Length
1.	"Ten Minutes"	3:06

Side B
No.	Title	Length
1.	"Anne Arbour"	3:29

== Additional releases ==
- "Ten Minutes" was released on the band's rarities and B-sides compilation Eudora and their live album Live! @ The Granada Theater.
- "Anne Arbour" was released on the band's second EP, Red Letter Day and their rarities and B-sides compilation Eudora.
- "Ten Minutes" was re-recorded for the band's second full-length studio album Something to Write Home About.

== Personnel ==
- Matt Pryor – vocals, guitar
- Jim Suptic – vocals, guitar
- Rob Pope – bass
- Ryan Pope – drums
- James Dewees – vocals, keyboard
