= Action & Action =

Single by The Get Up Kids

from the album Something to Write Home About
- B-side: "Close to Me"; "I'm a Loner Dottie, a Rebel"
- Released: March 24, 2000
- Recorded: 1999
- Genre: Emo
- Length: 10:25
- Label: Epitaph
- Songwriter(s): James Dewees; Rob Pope; Ryan Pope; Matt Pryor; Jim Suptic
- Producer(s): The Get Up Kids

The Get Up Kids singles chronology
"Ten Minutes" (1999)	"Action & Action" (2000)	"Wouldn't Believe It" (2004)

"Action & Action" is the second single from The Get Up Kids' album Something to Write Home About. The single was released in Europe and North America on March 24, 2000, and November 24 elsewhere. It is the first Get Up Kids single released on CD. A music video for the song was released in December 1999.

== Track listing ==
All tracks are written by The Get Up Kids

No.	Title	Length
1.	"Action & Action"	4:06
2.	"Close to Me (The Cure cover)"	3:24
3.	"I'm a Loner Dottie, a Rebel"	2:55

== Additional releases ==
- "Action & Action" was released on the band's live album Live! @ The Granada Theater.
- "Close to Me" was released on the band's rarities and B-sides collection Eudora.
- A special version of "I'm a Loner Dottie, a Rebel" was released on the band's rarities and B-sides collection Eudora.

== Personnel ==
- Matt Pryor - vocals, guitar
- Jim Suptic - guitar, backing vocals
- Rob Pope - bass
- Ryan Pope - drums
- James Dewees - keyboards
