= Automatic (The Get Up Kids song) =

Single by The Get Up Kids

from the album There Are Rules
- B-side: "Past Is Past"
- Released: 2011
- Recorded: 2010
- Genre: Indie rock
- Length: 6:46
- Label: Quality Hill Recordings
- Songwriters: James Dewees; Rob Pope; Ryan Pope; Matt Pryor; Jim Suptic
- Producer: The Get Up Kids

The Get Up Kids singles chronology
| "Wouldn't Believe It" (2004) | "Automatic" (2011) |

"Automatic" is the first single from The Get Up Kids' album There Are Rules. After the band's breakup in 2005, "Automatic" was the first single released by the band following their reformation in 2008.

== Track listing ==
All tracks are written by The Get Up Kids.

Side A
| No. | Title | Length |
|---|---|---|
| 1. | "Automatic" | 2:55 |

Side B
| No. | Title | Length |
|---|---|---|
| 1. | "Past is Past" | 3:51 |

== Release ==
"Automatic" was released in the fall of 2011 on 7" vinyl. It was the band's first release on their own Quality Hill Recordings label, and marked the band's departure from long-time partners Vagrant Records.

A music video for the song was released on February 17, 2011.

== Personnel ==
- Matt Pryor - Vocals, guitar
- Jim Suptic - Guitar, Backing vocals
- Rob Pope - Bass
- Ryan Pope - Drums
- James Dewees - Keyboard
- Ed Rose - Producer
