= Red Letter Day (EP) =

EP by the Get Up Kids
- Released: July 20, 1999
- Recorded: 1997
- Studio: Red House
- Genre: Emo; pop punk
- Length: 16:45
- Label: Doghouse
- Producer: Ed Rose

The Get Up Kids chronology
| Four Minute Mile (1997) | Red Letter Day (1999) | Something to Write Home About (1999) |

Alternative cover
- Cover for The EPs: Red Letter Day and Woodson

Professional ratings
Review scores
| Source | Rating |
|---|---|
| LAS Magazine | Unfavorable |
| Star Pulse Music | 3/5 stars |
| Pitchfork | 5.1/10 |

Red Letter Day is an EP by American emo band the Get Up Kids. It was released before their second full-length album Something to Write Home About. It featured James Dewees on the keyboard. Shortly after the album was released, Dewees joined the band full-time.

The album was recorded in 1997 at Red House Studios by Ed Rose, the producer of the band's first EP Woodson. The album was released only on 10" vinyl. The album was printed on black vinyl, save for two limited pressings, 500 translucent green and 500 clear.

== Additional releases ==
- The entire EP was later combined with the band's other EP Woodson and re-released on one CD entitled The EPs: Red Letter Day and Woodson.
- The songs "Forgive and Forget" and "Anne Arbour" were later released on the band's compilation album Eudora.
- The song "Anne Arbour" was released as a b-side on the single for the song "Ten Minutes".
- The song "Red Letter Day" was featured on the band's second studio album Something to Write Home About.
- The songs "Mass Pike" and "Red Letter Day" were featured on the band's live album Live! @ the Granada Theater.
- The song "Red Letter Day" was featured on the compilation No-Fi Trash released by Suburban Home Records.

== Track listing ==
All tracks are written by the Get Up Kids.

Side A
| No. | Title | Length |
|---|---|---|
| 1. | "One Year Later" | 3:05 |
| 2. | "Red Letter Day" | 2:57 |
| 3. | "Forgive and Forget" | 3:26 |

Side B
| No. | Title | Length |
|---|---|---|
| 1. | "Anne Arbour" | 3:33 |
| 2. | "Mass Pike" | 3:44 |

== Personnel ==
Band

- Matt Pryor – lead vocals, guitar
- Jim Suptic – guitar, vocals
- Rob Pope – bass
- Ryan Pope – drums

Additional musicians

- James Dewees – keyboards, vocals

Production

- Ed Rose – production

Design

- Scott Ritcher – cover design
- Chris Holland – cover design
