= Wouldn't Believe It =

Single by The Get Up Kids

from the album Guilt Show
- Released: January 21, 2004
- Genre: Indie rock, emo
- Length: 14:30
- Songwriter(s): James Dewees; Rob Pope; Ryan Pope; Matt Pryor; Jim Suptic
- Producer(s): The Get Up Kids

The Get Up Kids singles chronology
"Action & Action" (2000)	"Wouldn't Believe It" (2004)

"Wouldn't Believe It" is the first single from The Get Up Kids' album Guilt Show. The single was only released in Japan.

== Track listing ==
All tracks are written by The Get Up Kids

No.	Title	Length
1.	"Martyr Me"	3:26
2.	"Wouldn't Believe It"	3:47
3.	"I'll Catch You (Acoustic)"	3:46
4.	"Wish You Were Here (Acoustic)"	3:31

== Additional releases ==
- "Martyr Me" was released on the band's fourth album Guilt Show, as well as their live album Live! @ The Granada Theater.
- "Wouldn't Believe It" was released on the band's fourth album, Guilt Show.
- The acoustic versions of "I'll Catch You" and "Wish You Were Here" were released on a secret online site that could only be accessed by putting the Enhanced CD version of Guilt Show into a CD-Rom drive.

== Personnel ==
- Matt Pryor - Vocals, guitar
- Jim Suptic - Guitar, Backing vocals
- Rob Pope - Bass
- Ryan Pope - Drums
- James Dewees - Keyboard
- Ed Rose - Producer
