= The Get Up Kids / Braid =

Post Marked Stamps No. 4

EP by The Get Up Kids and Braid
- Released: September 1997
- Studio: Red House Studios, Eudora, Kansas; Private Studios, Urbana, Illinois
- Genre: Emo; indie rock
- Length: 5:29
- Label: Tree
- Producer: Ed Rose; Brendan Gamble

The Get Up Kids chronology
Woodson (1997)	Post Marked Stamps No. 4 (1997)	Four Minute Mile (1997)

Braid chronology
Niagara (1996)	Post Marked Stamps No. 4 (1997)	First Day Back (1997)

Alternative cover
- Alternative cover for the European version of the album

"Post Marked Stamps No. 4" is a split EP between Kansas City, Missouri band The Get Up Kids and Chicago, Illinois group Braid. The album is the fourth in the "Post Marked Stamps" series, a set of nine split EPs between various bands put out by Tree Records in 1997. There were 2 different pressings of the album; One distributed in the United States, and another sold in Europe during the band's joint European tour. Each song was recorded separately, with "I'm a Loner Dottie, a Rebel" recorded at Red House Studios in Eudora, Kansas, and "Forever Got Shorter" recorded at Private Studios in Urbana, Illinois. The set included a sealed envelope that contained three postcards: one postcard for each song, including recording information and lyrics, and a third featuring poetry by Vigue Martin.

== Additional releases ==
- The Get Up Kids re-released this version of "I'm a Loner Dottie, a Rebel" on their b-sides collection Eudora. They also re-recorded the song for their second full-length studio album Something to Write Home About.
- Braid re-released "Forever Got Shorter" on the Movie Music, Vol. 1 collection. The song is also included on their live album Lucky to Be Alive.
- Tree Records released the entire Post Marked Stamps series on CD in 1999.

== Track listing ==
Side A - The Get Up Kids
No.	Title	Length
1.	"I'm a Loner Dottie, a Rebel"	2:55

Side B - Braid
No.	Title	Length
1.	"Forever Got Shorter"	3:34

== Personnel ==
The Get Up Kids

- Matt Pryor – vocals, guitar
- Jim Suptic – guitar, backing vocals
- Rob Pope – bass
- Ryan Pope – drums

Braid

- Bob Nanna – vocals, guitar
- Todd Bell – bass
- Chris Broach – vocals, guitar
- Roy Ewing – drums
