= Simple Science =

EP by The Get Up Kids
- Released: April 13, 2010
- Studio: Black Lodge Studios (Eudora, Kansas)
- Genre: Emo; indie rock
- Length: 16:08
- Label: Flyover Records
- Producer: Ed Rose

The Get Up Kids chronology
Guilt Show (2004)	Simple Science (2010)	There Are Rules (2011)

Professional ratings
Review scores
Source	Rating
Alternative Press	3.5/5 stars
The Album Project	5/5 stars

Simple Science is an EP by American rock band The Get Up Kids. The first official release from the band since re-forming after breaking up in 2005, and the first studio recording since 2004's Guilt Show, the EP was released April 13, 2010, on vinyl and April 27, 2010, on compact disc (both through the groups newly formed Flyover Records).

== Release ==
The vinyl edition of the release was limited to 2,000 hand-numbered copies, released in four different varieties of 500 pressings each: 180-gram black vinyl, green marble vinyl, pink marble vinyl (exclusive to Hot Topic) and baby blue vinyl (exclusive to Vinyl Collective).

The compact disc version was released on April 27, 2010, and limited to 10,000 hand-numbered copies. The digital download version of the album will be available exclusively through iTunes.

== Track listing ==
All tracks are written by The Get Up Kids.

Simple Science EP
No.	Title	Length
1.	"Your Petty Pretty Things"	3:28
2.	"Keith Case"	4:05
3.	"Tommy Gentle"	2:31
4.	"How You're Bound"	6:02

== Personnel ==
Band

- Matt Pryor – lead vocals, guitar
- Jim Suptic – guitar, vocals
- Rob Pope – bass
- Ryan Pope – drums
- James Dewees – keyboards, vocals

Production

- Ed Rose – production

== Charts ==
Chart	Peak position
US Billboard 200	194
Top Independent	29
