= A Newfound Interest in Massachusetts =

Single by the Get Up Kids

from the album Woodson
- B-side: "Off The Wagon"
- Released: May 1997
- Genre: Alternative rock, emo
- Length: 6:06
- Label: Contrast
- Songwriters: Rob Pope, Ryan Pope, Matt Pryor, Jim Suptic
- Producer: The Get Up Kids

The Get Up Kids singles chronology
"Shorty" (1996)	"A Newfound Interest in Massachusetts" (1997)	"Ten Minutes" (1999)

"A Newfound Interest in Massachusetts" is the second single from Kansas City, Missouri, band the Get Up Kids. The single, also commonly referred to as The Loveteller EP by fans, was released in 1997 on Contrast Records. The final pressing of the album was printed on orange vinyl in a limited run of 200. Each of this set was packaged in a handmade sleeve with the band's name spray-painted on, and an actual photo glued to the cover by label owner Al Barkley.

== Track listing ==
All tracks are written by the Get Up Kids.

Side A
No.	Title	Length
1.	"A Newfound Interest in Massachusetts"	3:31

Side B
No.	Title	Length
1.	"Off The Wagon"	2:35

== Additional releases ==
- The song "A Newfound Interest in Massachusetts" was re-written and released on the band's rarities and b-sides collection Eudora (2001) as "Newfound Mass (2000)".
- "A Newfound Interest in Massachusetts" and "Off The Wagon" were also released on the band's EP Woodson (1997).

== Personnel ==
- Matt Pryor - Vocals, Guitar
- Jim Suptic - Guitar, Backing Vocals
- Rob Pope - Bass
- Ryan Pope - Drums
