= The Get Up Kids / The Anniversary =

Central Standard Time/Vasil + Bluey

EP (split EP) by The Get Up Kids/The Anniversary
- Released: November 21, 1999
- Studio: Mad Hatter, Silverlake, California; Red House, Eudora, Kansas
- Genre: Emo; indie rock
- Length: 7:24
- Label: Vagrant
- Producer: Ed Rose, Chad Blinman, Alex Brahl

The Get Up Kids chronology
Something to Write Home About (1999)	Central Standard Time/Vasil + Bluey (1999)	Eudora (2001)

The Anniversary chronology
Split with Prouendall (1997)	Central Standard Time/Vasil + Bluey (1999)	What's My Name? My Name Is… What?! What?! (2001)

"Central Standard Time/Vasil + Bluey" is a split EP between Kansas City, Missouri, band the Get Up Kids and Lawrence, Kansas, group the Anniversary. The album was released on colored vinyl in 1999 on Vagrant Records. There were seven different pressings of the album, with each pressing on different colored vinyl. Each song was recorded separately, with "Central Standard Time" recorded at Mad Hatter Studios in Silverlake, California, in the summer of 1999 while the band was recording their second full-length album Something to Write Home About. "Vasil + Bluey" was recorded at Red House Studios in Eudora, Kansas.

== Track listing ==
Side A - The Get Up Kids
No.	Title	Length
1.	"Central Standard Time"	3:23

Side B - The Anniversary
No.	Title	Length
1.	"Vasil + Bluey"	4:01

== Additional releases ==
- The Get Up Kids re-released "Central Standard Time" on their B-Sides collection Eudora. It was also featured as a bonus track on the European version of the band's second album Something to Write Home About.
- The Anniversary re-released "Vasil + Bluey" on their B-Sides collection Devil On Our Side: B-Sides & Rarities.

== Personnel ==
The Get Up Kids

- Matt Pryor – vocals, guitar
- Jim Suptic – guitar, backing vocals
- Rob Pope – bass
- Ryan Pope – drums
- James Dewees – keyboards

The Anniversary

- Josh Berwanger – guitar
- Justin Roelofs – guitar
- Adrianne Verhoeven – keyboards
- James David – bass guitar
- Christian Jankowski – drums
