= Granada Theater (Lawrence, Kansas) =

United States historic place

Coordinates: 38°57′53″N 95°14′08″W

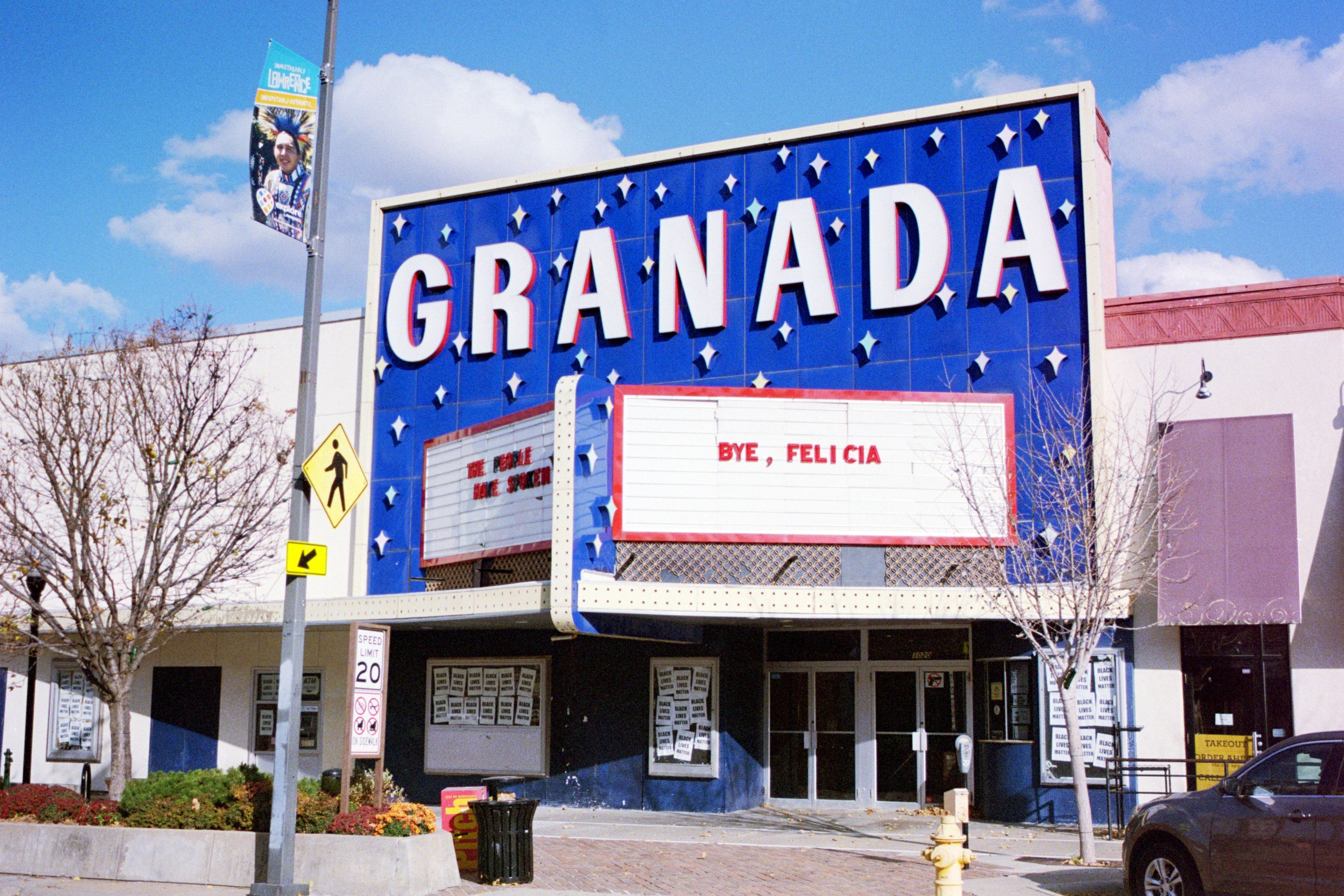
- Interactive map of Granada Theater
- Location: 1020 Massachusetts St. Lawrence, Kansas
- Capacity: 2,300 originally 900 currently
- Type: Concert Venue

Construction
- Built: 1928
- Opened: 1928
- Renovated: September 7, 1934, 1993

Website
- Official Website

The Granada Theater is a historic theater and concert venue located in Lawrence, Kansas.

== History ==
The Granada Theater was originally built in 1928 as a vaudeville theater in Lawrence, Kansas by the Boller Brothers. It was renovated in 1934 as a movie theater. The first film shown there was Robert Montgomery's 1934 comedy Hide-Out.

The theater was renovated again in 1993 and repurposed as a comedy club/concert venue, drawing acts such as Nightwish, The Smashing Pumpkins, Ben Folds, The Flaming Lips, The Strokes, and Weezer.

In 2005, Kansas City band The Get Up Kids recorded their live album Live! @ The Granada Theater at the Granada.
