= Central Standard Time (disambiguation) =

Central Standard Time may refer to:

- Central Standard Time (North America), UTC−06:00
- Australian Central Standard Time, UTC+09:30
- Central Standard Time/Vasil + Bluey, a split EP between bands The Get Up Kids and The Anniversary
