= Problems (The Get Up Kids album) =

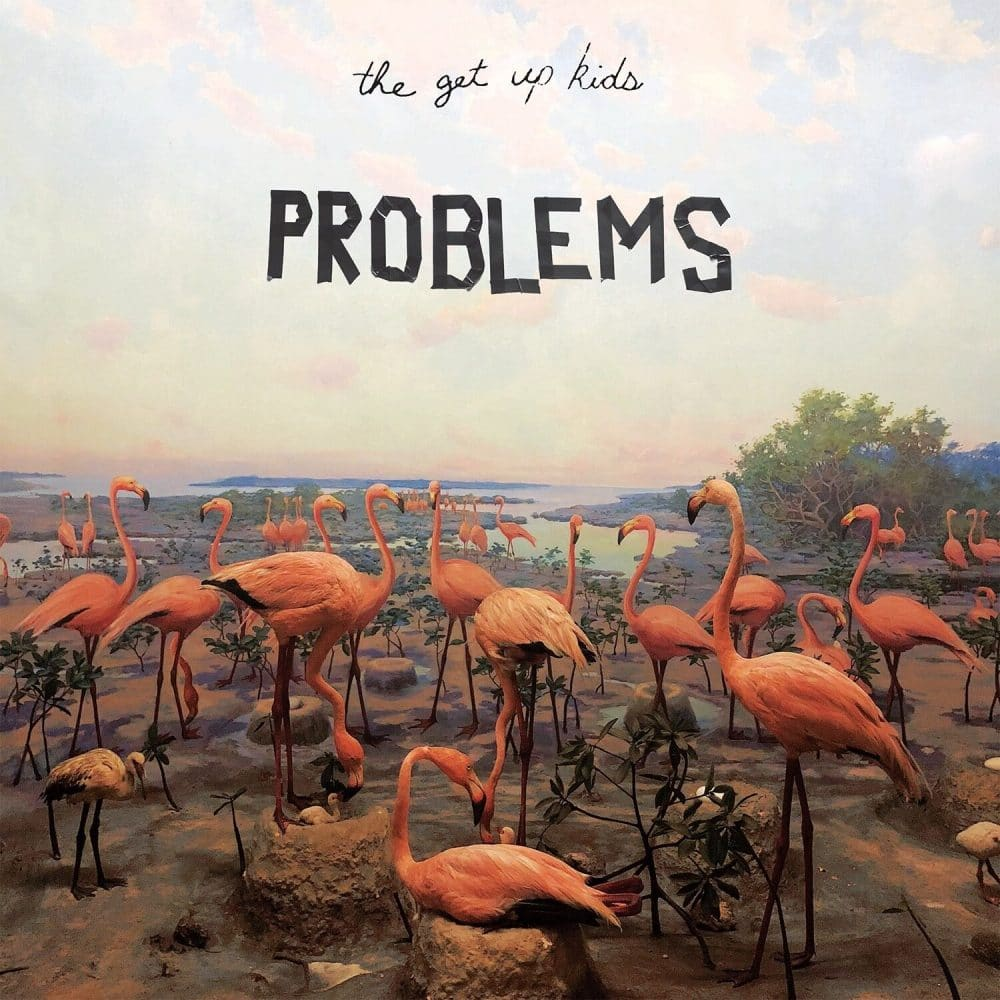

Studio album by the Get Up Kids
- Released: May 10, 2019
- Recorded: September 2018
- Studios: Tarquin, Bridgeport, Connecticut
- Genres: Alternative rock; indie rock; emo; pop-punk
- Length: 38:51
- Label: Polyvinyl
- Producers: Peter Katis; The Get Up Kids

The Get Up Kids chronology
Kicker (2018)	Problems (2019)

Singles from Problems
- 1. "Satellite" Released: March 7, 2019; 2. "The Problem Is Me" Released: April 2, 2019

Problems is the sixth studio album by American rock band the Get Up Kids, their first full-length with Polyvinyl Records. It is their final release to feature keyboardist James Dewees before his departure in 2019.

== Writing and production ==
After the band's self-released reunion album There Are Rules largely failed to find an audience, the members of the Get Up Kids took another short hiatus working non-music industry jobs, interrupted only by brief weekend tours and one-off shows. While drinking at a bar before their performance at the 2017 When We Were Young festival, the band began to talk about recommitting to the Get Up Kids as a full-time pursuit.

Problems was recorded at Tarquin Studios in Bridgeport, Connecticut over 19 days in September 2018, reuniting with Peter Katis—who mixed the band's divisive 2002 album On a Wire—who produced alongside the band. It marked the first time the band had worked with Katis since he found mainstream success producing bands like Interpol and The National.

Additional recording was done by Greg Giorgio, Kurt Leon, Tim Walsh, Justin Hunt, and the band. Katis mixed the album, before Greg Calbi mastered it at Sterling Sound.

Speaking of the album's themes in 2021, Matt Pryor said "There's always been a lot of reflection in our lyrics, this one in particular though is coming from a place of being reflective in your 40's and having a lot more knowledge of what works for you, and what doesn't work for you, and what your limitations are." The band started to draw from different influences. Pryor "got really into XTC and finally started to understand Oasis, who the rest of the band adores but I never really got until recently."

The feelings of being stuck, unhappy or full of self-doubt don’t go away when you get older — they evolve. They concentrate on more specific things. When you’re younger everything’s absolute. This person is good, and that person is bad. As you gain life experience you realize it’s significantly more complicated than that, but the feelings are still there. Essentially, it’s just as easy to feel like you’re lost in a sea of insanity when you’re 41 as it is when you’re 14.

== Reception ==
Professional ratings
Aggregate scores
Source	Rating
Metacritic	79/100
Review scores
Source	Rating
AllMusic	3.5/5 stars
Exclaim!	4/5 stars
Kerrang!	4/5 stars
Punknews.org	4/5 stars
Under the Radar	6/10 stars

The album was largely well-reviewed, with critics hailing it as a return to form. According to the review aggregator Metacritic, Problems received "generally favorable reviews" based on a weighted average score of 79 out of 100 from 6 critic scores. Writing for Punknews.org, Julie River praised the album, calling "The Problem is Me", "one of the bounciest, catchiest pop songs that The Get Up Kids have ever put out," and favorably compares "Your Ghost is Gone" to the closing tracks of the band's first two albums. Exclaim! was equally glowing, saying that "[Problems] sounds just as great as some of their older albums, reminding us why this band are (sic) still one of the greatest emo/alternative acts to come out of the '90s."

Under the Radar was more mixed, with critic Adam Turner-Heffer writing that "Problems is an altogether solid enough and enjoyable listen, it merely fails to push beyond being an impression of the band’s former glories."

== Track listing ==
All songs written by the Get Up Kids.

Problems
No.	Title	Length
1.	"Satellite"	2:55
2.	"The Problem Is Me"	2:42
3.	"Salina"	4:38
4.	"Now or Never"	3:05
5.	"Lou Barlow"	2:17
6.	"Fairweather Friends"	3:24
7.	"Common Ground"	4:05
8.	"Waking Up Alone"	3:28
9.	"The Advocate"	3:12
10.	"Symphony of Silence"	2:56
11.	"Brakelines"	2:21
12.	"Your Ghost Is Gone"	3:48
Total length:		38:51

== Personnel ==
Personnel per booklet.

The Get Up Kids

- Matt Pryor – vocals, guitar, piano
- Jim Suptic – vocals, guitar
- Ryan Pope – drums
- Rob Pope – bass, cover photo
- James Dewees – keyboards, vocals

Additional musicians

- Kori Gardener – additional vocals (track 7)

Production and design

- Peter Katis – producer, recording, mixing
- The Get Up Kids – producer, additional recording
- Greg Giorgio – additional recording
- Kurt Leon – additional recording
- Tim Walsh – additional recording
- Justin Hunt – additional recording
- Greg Calbi – mastering
- Pocket Studio Creative – design, Layout
- Lindsay Pope – back photo
- The Springfield Science Museum – flamingo diorama

== Charts ==
Chart performance for Problems
Chart	Peak
US Top Vinyl Albums	10
US Top Independent Albums	11
