= Woodson (EP) =

EP by the Get Up Kids
- Released: 1997
- Recorded: November 1996
- Studio: Red House (Eudora, Kansas)
- Genre: Emo; pop punk; indie rock
- Length: 27:16
- Label: Contrast; Doghouse
- Producer: Ed Rose

The Get Up Kids chronology
Split with Coalesce (1996)	Woodson (1997)	Split with Braid (1997)

Alternative cover
- Cover for The EPs: Woodson and Red Letter Day

Professional ratings
Review scores
Source	Rating
AllMusic	2.5/5 stars
Star Pulse Music	2.5/5 stars

Woodson is the first non-single release by Kansas City, Missouri, band the Get Up Kids. It was recorded at Red House Studios in Eudora, Kansas, in November 1996. The album was originally released on Contrast Records, shortly before the band was signed to a two-record deal on Doghouse Records. The album was the first to be produced by Ed Rose, who would go on collaborate several other times with the band in the future.

== Additional releases ==
- The entire EP was later combined with the band's other EP Red Letter Day and re-released on one CD entitled: The EPs: Woodson and Red Letter Day.
- The song "A Newfound Interest in Massachusetts" was later re-arranged and released on the band's Eudora album.
- The song "Second Place" was covered by the hardcore band Coalesce, re-titled "I'm Giving Up on This One" and released on the Coalesce/Get Up Kids Split 7".
- The song "Off the Wagon" was released as a b-side on the single for "A Newfound Interest in Massachusetts".

== Track listing ==
=== Original release ===
All tracks are written by the Get Up Kids.

Side A
No.	Title	Length
1.	"Woodson"	4:14

Side B
No.	Title	Length
1.	"Second Place"	2:21

=== Doghouse Records version ===
Due to a distribution conflict, Doghouse Records released its own version of Woodson shortly after the Contrast release, combining the songs from the EP with the band's Loveteller EP. It was released on both 7" vinyl and compact disc.

Woodson re-release
No.	Title	Length
1.	"Woodson"	4:14
2.	"Second Place"	2:21
3.	"Off the Wagon"	2:35
4.	"A Newfound Interest in Massachusetts"	3:31

== Personnel ==
- Matt Pryor – lead vocals, guitar
- Jim Suptic – guitar, vocals
- Rob Pope – bass
- Ryan Pope – drums

Production

- Ed Rose – production

Design

- Paul Drake – photography
