= Four Minute Mile =

Studio album by the Get Up Kids
- Released: September 30, 1997
- Recorded: April 1997
- Studio: CRC, Chicago
- Genre: Emo; pop punk; indie rock
- Length: 34:49
- Label: Doghouse
- Producer: Bob Weston

The Get Up Kids chronology
Split with Braid (1997)	Four Minute Mile (1997)	Red Letter Day EP (1999)

2001 remaster
- Alternative cover for the 2001 remaster

Four Minute Mile is the debut studio album by American emo band the Get Up Kids, released on September 30, 1997.

== Background ==
The Get Up Kids evolved out of the breakup of Kingpin, which consisted of high school friends guitarist Jim Suptic, bassist Rob Pope and his brother drummer Ryan Pope. After that group's demise, vocalist/guitarist Matt Pryor formed Secret Decoder Ring with Suptic, before they broke up after six months. Pryor and Suptic started working with Rob Pope, who invited college friend drummer Nathan Shay to form the Get Up Kids in 1994. Following this, the group self financed the 7" single "Shorty", which would sell over 2,000 copies. Shay moved to St. Louis, Missouri to focus on his studies, eventually leaving the group in April 1996. Ryan Pope joined initially on a temporary basis as there was concern with having both brothers in the band, and with Suptic and Pope not getting along in the past.

The group recorded two additional releases: one for Florida-based Outback Records, while the other was for Rhode Island–based Contrast Records. After recording four songs, the group sent copies of them to rock-centic labels listed in the publication The Musician's Guide To Touring and Promotion. The songs caught the attention of Ohio-based Doghouse Records, who was interested in signing the band. They wanted to release a 7" vinyl EP as a precursor to an album. Instead of recording another release, the group paid for the Outback release and issued it through Doghouse as the Woodson EP. The group subsequently signed a two-album recording contract with Doghouse.

== Recording ==
Four Minute Mile was recorded in April 1997 on a budget of $4,000 with Shellac bassist Bob Weston acting as producer. Instead of recording at Red House Recordings, which they had used for the previous EP, they opted to track the record at the Chicago Recording Company. As Ryan Pope was still at school, the members went to a local music store to stock up on guitar strings and plectrums. They ended up running over a rock, and later found out it punctured the car's exhaust manifold, causing carbon monoxide to circulate through the car and had to travel with the windows down. The members waited in the parking lot of Pope's school, before he got in the car and they drove to Chicago. The recording sessions took place over the course of two and a half days from a Friday night to 3am on a Sunday.

When making the Woodson EP, the group tracked four songs and mixed them within one and a half days. They thought that since they were able to do four in one day, they would be able to do eleven in two and a half days for Four Minute Mile. As a result, some of the songs featured the low quality production that the EP had; Pryor later stated they should have spent more time recording it, while Suptic said it "sounds like crap". The short recording time was due to recording budget and also so that Pope wouldn't miss school the following day. Pryor said Weston acted more in the vein of an engineer than a producer: "He's kind of like, 'Do you like how it sounds?' 'OK, yeah, it's cool.'" Weston mixed the recordings in a four-hour session.

== Release ==
As the members had an album coming out, they came to the decision to take a year off from school to do the band full-time. Suptic and Pryor worked with Joe Winkle of Boys Life at Linda Hall Library. The pair learned that Boys Life were touring and used their contacts, coupled with Pryor's copy of Maximumrocknroll's Book Your Own Fucking Life guide, and started working on a touring route. This led the pair to Bob Nanna of Braid, who were also booking a tour in the same timeframe following the same route, deciding to go on tour together. In June 1997, the group went on a US tour with Braid and Ethel Meserve. During this tour, the Get Up Kids played a show in Wilkes-Barre, Pennsylvania with Coalesce, who they became friends with.

Four Minute Mile was released on September 30. Further tour outings included an east coast and southern tour with Jejune and Mineral in September, west coast tour with No Knife in October and November, and concluded the year with a north east tour with Jimmy Eat World in December. Ryan Pope had planned to go to college, until Doghouse offered to fund a European tour, which took place in February and March 1998 with Braid. The following month, they embarked on a southern tour, and a west coast tour with Braid in May. Following this, the group took a break, before eventually going on a nationwide tour supporting MxPx and Home Grown in October. After the conclusion of this tour, Coalesce drummer James Dewees joined as a keyboardist.

A remastered version of the album was released by Doghouse Records in 2001. This was largely a way of capitalizing on the recent success of the band's second album, 1999's Something to Write Home About, which rocketed the band to international stardom. In December 2008, Doghouse re-pressed the album on vinyl. Doghouse reissued the album, alongside The EP's: Red Letter Day and Woodson compilation, on cassette in 2017.

== Critical reception ==
Professional ratings
Review scores
Source	Rating
AllMusic	4/5 stars
Ox-Fanzine	Favorable
Punknews.org	4/5 stars
The New Rolling Stone Album Guide	2/5 stars

The album helped the band develop a national fanbase, as well as garnering a bidding war over the band from several major labels, including Geffen Records, Sub Pop Records and Mojo Records. The band ended up signing with Mojo, but was quickly disappointed with their choice when the label asked the band to re-record the song "Don't Hate Me", feeling that the label was underestimating their potential.

In a 2017 retrospective celebrating the album's 20th anniversary, Vice Media called Four Minute Mile "a snapshot of a young band with their career ahead of them," that "[t]he earnest candor of the lyrics coupled with the innovations in bridging punk and emo make this album a staple in emo's history," and calling it a "near-masterpiece." In 2017, Rolling Stone named it one of the best emo albums of all time.

== Legacy ==
The Get Up Kids' 1997 debut album Four Minute Mile combined the driving, hooky indie-punk of Superchunk and the more tangled sounds of Midwest emo and helped create the blueprint for early/mid 2000s emo-pop in the process.

— Andrew Sacher, BrooklynVegan

Four Minute Mile is considered a benchmark album of the emo genre, influencing the likes of Saves the Day, the Early November, Midtown and Fall Out Boy. Frank Turner and Frank Iero of My Chemical Romance have expressed admiration for the album. In a 2005 interview with Alternative Press, Pete Wentz of Fall Out Boy remarked that the album had a major influence on the band as a whole. "The first time I heard [The Get Up Kids] was around Four Minute Mile. I was in high school. There was an honesty and sincerity [to the album]. It seemed more about the fact that this music was "emotional," than an actual sound than labeled them". In the same interview, he remarked that "Fall Out Boy would not be a band if it were not for The Get Up Kids".

In 2020, BrooklynVegan included Four Minute Mile on its list of the best punk albums of 1997, alongside Blink 182's Dude Ranch, and Nimrod by Green Day, writing that "The Get Up Kids' 1997 debut album Four Minute Mile combined the driving, hooky indie-punk of Superchunk and the more tangled sounds of Midwest emo and helped create the blueprint for early/mid 2000s emo-pop in the process." They compared it favorably to the band's later defining work Something to Write Home About; "STWHA is nearly perfect but Four Minute Mile is charmingly flawed, and sometimes you're craving something rawer and punkier than the more polished-up and ballad-inclusive Something To Write Home About."

LA Weekly included Four Minute Mile as one of the 20 greatest emo albums of all time.

== Track listing ==
All tracks are written by The Get Up Kids.

No.	Title	Length
1.	"Coming Clean"	2:07
2.	"Don't Hate Me"	2:54
3.	"Fall Semester"	3:21
4.	"Stay Gold, Ponyboy"	2:55
5.	"Lowercase West Thomas"	1:59
6.	"Washington Square Park"	3:08
7.	"Last Place You Look"	2:31
8.	"Better Half"	3:25
9.	"No Love"	3:05
10.	"Shorty"	3:22
11.	"Michelle with One "L""	6:02
Total length:		34:49

== Personnel ==
Band

- Matt Pryor – lead vocals, guitar
- Jim Suptic – guitar, vocals
- Rob Pope – bass
- Ryan Pope – drums

Additional musicians

- Robert A. A. Lowe – vocals

Production

- Bob Weston – producer, engineering, mixing

Design

- Scott Ritcher – cover art
