= On a Wire =

Studio album by The Get Up Kids
- Released: May 14, 2002
- Recorded: November 2001, January–February 2002
- Studios: Z'Gwonth Studios, Lawrence, Kansas; Tarquin Studios, Bridgeport, Connecticut
- Genres: Alternative country; Americana; indie rock
- Length: 43:28
- Label: Vagrant
- Producer: Scott Litt

The Get Up Kids chronology
Eudora (2001)	On a Wire (2002)	Guilt Show (2004)

Singles from On a Wire
- 1. "Overdue" Released: June 2002

On a Wire is the third studio album by American emo band The Get Up Kids on Vagrant Records. Released three years after their breakout sophomore album Something to Write Home About, On a Wire was a massive departure from the band's established sound, eschewing the brighter pop-punk that helped define emo as a genre in favor of a darker, more adult sound inspired by 70's rock bands like Led Zeppelin.

Reception to the album was extremely divisive, and is widely seen as having derailed the band's career just as emo was starting to break into the mainstream with contemporaries like Jimmy Eat World and Dashboard Confessional receiving extensive radio play. However, in the years since, the album has been re-appraised, with many praising its complex songwriting.

== Background and recording ==
After touring extensively to support Something to Write Home About, the band was looking to depart from their high-energy powerpop style in lieu of a slower, more mellow sound. In 2000, vocalist/guitarist Matt Pryor moved to Boston, Massachusetts, and drummer Ryan Pope moved to Los Angeles, California. As a result, the members only saw each other when they embarked on tours. After a US tour in October and November, the group began working on a new album. By the end of the year, they had managed to fit in ten rehearsals, writing eight songs in the process. Their goal was to write 30 songs, which they planned to whittle down to 12. Following this, the group received a number of tour offers that they accepted, including opening for Weezer and Green Day.

Unlike the band's previous work, which they played extensively at live shows before recording, On a Wire was written entirely in the studio, leading to a much less energetic sound. Years later, Jim Suptic remarked that had the band toured the songs before recording, the resulting album would have been "less acoustic and heavier in parts."

After touring ended, the band was physically and mentally fatigued, and looked to write a significantly different album. The group eventually reconvened in Kansas and wrote new material for their next album. Soon afterwards, they accumulated 25 songs. The band compiled a list of potential producers for their next album. Scott Litt approached the group after liking the demos he heard. Eudora, a compilation of rarities and obscure recordings, was released as a stop-gap release to capitalise on the band's success and to maintain hype for their next album. In November 2001, the band recorded "Campfire Kansas" at Z'Gwonth Studios in Lawrence, Kansas. Following this, the band embarked on a headlining US tour, with support from the Appleseed Cast and Alkaline Trio. The rest of the album was recorded in January and February 2002 at Tarquin Studios in Bridgeport, Connecticut with Litt over the course of six weeks.

Keyboardist James Dewees stated in an interview with AP Magazine that Litt "knew how to make bands sound good, but he was taking a band that was used to playing four-chord rock songs. We didn't know what we were doing." According to Pope, Litt didn't allow Dewees much control with his instrument: "James would go into something and (Scott Litt) would be like, 'No jazz chords! Don't do that! One hand!'" Litt mixed the recordings while Peter Katis acted as engineer. Ed Rose, who had worked with the band previously, provided additional creative input on "Overdue" while Carl Nappa did digital editing. Katis did additional mixing at The Hit Factory in New York City later in February with assistance from Jamie Duncan. Stephen Marcussen then mastered the recordings at Marcussen Mastering.

== Composition ==
On a Wire's songs were collectively written by the group. Previously, whatever number of songs they had prior to entering the studio would end up being on a record. For On a Wire, they initially wrote double the number of songs that would end up on the album. All of the members would show up to practice sessions with a song, which would be fleshed out by everyone. This was to allow every member to have some input in the songwriting and reduced any resentment in a situation where a single person was writing all the songs. In the past, the group would play songs as a whole band, and sometimes play them on tour, before recording them in the studio at a fast pace. This time, they would take the demo recordings of songs and build upon them.

Musically, the album's sound has been classed as alternative country, americana and indie rock, drawing comparisons to the Promise Ring's Wood/Water (2002), Wilco and the Dream Syndicate. It marked a shift away from the group's earlier pop punk/emo sound and replaced it mainly with acoustic guitars, quiet vocals and more prominent keyboards. Andrew Sacher of BrooklynVegan wrote that this departure did not seem as drastic for Pryor, who had been exploring similar sounds with his side effort the New Amsterdams. Bassist Rob Pope said they wanted to make an album that was less "guitar-rock-oriented", opting to focus more on the songs' arrangements. Pryor said most of the songs were "sort of questioning where you're at and what you want to do and ultimately coming to the conclusion that you've got to be happy with what you're doing." The album's title is taken from "Walking on a Wire", which was originally titled "Career Killer"; the song talks about a relationship failing. "Overdue" is about Pryor's dad and things he thinks about as a parent himself: "If I'm going to learn anything from my parents, it's going to be what not to do."

== Release and promotion ==
On March 22, 2002, On a Wire was announced for release in two months' time; alongside this, the album's track listing and artwork were posted online. The following month, the band performed at Skate and Surf Fest. On April 25, 2002, "Overdue" was made available for streaming through an e-card on the band's website. On a Wire was released through independent label Vagrant Records on May 14, 2002. The album's artwork was created by Travis Millard; Pryor said it was "incredibly complicated" as the band wanted it to stand out when compared to the covers of their other albums. In May and June, the group went on a headlining US tour with support from Hot Rod Circuit, the Jealous Sound, Rhett Miller and Audio Learning Center. The album was also released in two record versions: black 180 gram vinyl and limited edition picture disc.

On June 21, a music video was released for "Overdue" on the group's website, consisting of animation made by Millard. Around this time, "Overdue" was released as a single. The video had a tiny bit of success, receiving a few late-night plays on MTV and was in rotation for a week at MTV2. The band spent a week at home, before going on an east coast US tour in June and July with Superchunk and Hot Rod Circuit. After this, they performed "Stay Gone" on the Late Night with Conan O'Brien, and appeared at the Fuji Rock Festival in Japan. In August, the band went on a European tour, which included a number of festival appearances. The tour was to include shows in Italy, Switzerland and Amsterdam, but were left out due to time constraints.

During this tour, the album was released in Europe on August 20. Similar to the European tour, the band were due to perform on the Vagrant America arena tour alongside other Vagrant Records bands but had to cancel. Further European shows were planned but also abandoned due to scheduling conflicts, resulting in the band staying at home. They played a few Midwest US shows in November and December, before embarking on another European tour with Koufax in January 2003. In February and March, the band toured Japan, Canada and the US; they played with Hot Rod Circuit and Moneen. A music video for "Stay Gone", directed by Brock Batten and Jonathan Green, was released on the Vagrant Records Another Year on the Street Vol. 3 compilation in June 2004.

== Reception ==
Professional ratings
Aggregate scores
Source	Rating
Metacritic	69/100
Review scores
Source	Rating
AllMusic	3/5 stars
Chart Attack	Unfavorable
CMJ New Music Monthly	Favorable
E! Online	B
Entertainment Weekly	Favorable
Neumu	4/10 stars
Pitchfork	3.3/10
Rolling Stone	3/5 stars
Stylus Magazine	F
The Washington Post	Favorable

On a Wire charted at number 57 on the Billboard 200 and number 3 on the Independent Albums charts.

While the album was received with mild praise from more mainstream publications like Rolling Stone, many smaller publications felt that the band had abandoned their roots as second-wave emo group. However, despite the criticism, the band still incorporated much of their musical growth into their follow-up Guilt Show, which was much better received. However, many fans were upset with the concerts, since many of the songs on the album did not fit well with the band's usually energetic live show.

=== Fan response ===
Despite moderately positive critical reception and modest sales, fan response was largely dismissive and angry. In 2019, Pryor recounted "I think when we made On A Wire, we thought we were confident, but we were actually just arrogant. 'Oh yeah, everyone's always liked what we do, so they're gonna totally understand why we're doing a complete 180.' And some of them didn't!"

On a Wire is one in a line of albums from second-wave emo bands that marked an attempt to expand the sound and met with resistance from fans, having been compared to Wood/Water by The Promise Ring, as well as releases by their labelmates, such as The Anniversary's sophomore album Your Majesty and Saves The Day's In Reverie.

== Legacy ==
The poor reception of the album had a larger impact on the band's widespread popularity as a whole. In an interview with AP Magazine, lead singer Matt Pryor considered that the dramatic change in style for On a Wire seriously impacted the momentum the band had gained from Something to Write Home About, allowing later bands such as Dashboard Confessional to take much of the fan base that The Get Up Kids had previously earned.

Years later, Pryor acknowledged the effect the shift between Something to Write Home About and On a Wire had on their fan base in an interview with New York Press: "I feel like the way that we rolled out On A Wire was kind of abrasive and confrontational. I think it was very polarizing to our fans. We were kind of like, 'This is what we do, fuck you guys.' But hindsight is 20/20; I learned from that experience."

Over time, fan reception to the album has warmed. Speaking in 2019, Pryor said "I've been making the joke for a while that On A Wire is our Paul's Boutique where it's like … [it] didn't do well when it came out, but now, [fans say] 'Oh, it's my favorite record!' That's not what you said in 2002!"

== Track listing ==
All songs written by The Get Up Kids.

No.	Title	Length
1.	"Overdue"	2:59
2.	"Stay Gone"	3:04
3.	"Let the Reigns Go Loose"	3:43
4.	"Fall from Grace"	3:39
5.	"Grunge Pig"	4:09
6.	"High as the Moon"	3:27
7.	"All That I Know"	3:21
8.	"Walking on a Wire"	5:17
9.	"Wish You Were Here"	3:32
10.	"Campfire Kansas"	3:04
11.	"The Worst Idea"	3:25
12.	"Hannah Hold On"	3:48
Total length:		43:28

== Personnel ==
Personnel per sleeve.

The Get Up Kids

- Matthew Pryor – lead vocals, guitar
- James Dewees – keyboards, vocals
- Jim Suptic – guitar, vocals
- Ryan Pope – drums
- Rob Pope – bass

Production

- Scott Litt – producer, mixing
- Peter Katis – engineer, additional mixing
- Jamie Duncan – mixing assistant
- Carl Nappa – digital editing
- Stephen Marcussen – mastering
- Ed Rose – additional creative input (track 1)
- Travis Millard – artwork
- Joby J. Ford – art design

== Charts ==
Chart (2002)	Peak position
US Billboard 200	57
US Independent Albums (Billboard)	3
