= Eudora (album) =

Compilation album by the Get Up Kids
- Released: November 27, 2001
- Recorded: March 1996 – October 2000
- Genre: Emo; indie rock; pop punk
- Length: 58:02
- Label: Vagrant
- Producer: Alex Brahl; AJ Mogis; Ed Rose; Chad Blinman

The Get Up Kids chronology
Central Standard Time/Vasil + Bluey (1999)	Eudora (2001)	On a Wire (2002)

Professional ratings
Review scores
Source	Rating
AllMusic	2.5/5 stars
Drowned in Sound	5/5 stars
Exclaim!	Favorable
LAS Magazine	Favorable
Ox-Fanzine	Favorable
Pitchfork	3.1/10
Punknews.org	5/5 stars
Star Pulse Music	2.5/5 stars

Eudora is a collection of B-sides, rarities, and covers by the Get Up Kids. It was released on November 27, 2001, via Vagrant Records.

Named after Eudora, Kansas, the CD contains a number of cover songs which had been recorded for singles or compilations, by artists such as David Bowie, the Pixies, the Cure, and the Replacements. The song "Central Standard Time" originally appeared on a split 7-inch with the Anniversary, and the song "Burned Bridges" is a cover of the song "Harvest of Maturity" by the Metalcore band Coalesce, and the song originally appeared on a split 7-inch between the two groups, each band choosing one of the other band's songs and re-working it.

== Track listing ==
No.	Title	Original release	Length
1.	"Up on the Roof"	Rocket from the Crypt / The Get Up Kids split (2000)	2:44
2.	"Suffragette City" (David Bowie cover)		3:20
3.	"Central Standard Time"	The Get Up Kids / The Anniversary split (1999)	3:23
4.	"Close to Me" (The Cure cover)	Before You Were Punk 2 (1999)	3:24
5.	"Forgive and Forget"	Something to Write Home About (Japanese edition) (1999)	3:24
6.	"Regret" (New Order cover)	Something to Write Home About (Japanese edition) (1999)	5:00
7.	"Beer for Breakfast" (The Replacements cover)	Another Year on the Streets (2000)	1:37
8.	"Newfound Mass (2000)" (alt version of "A Newfound Interest in Massachusetts")	The Best Comp in the World (2000)	4:24
9.	"Alec Eiffel" (Pixies cover)	Where Is My Mind?: A Tribute to the Pixies (1999)	3:01
10.	"Impossible Outcomes" (The Metroschifter cover)	Encapsulated (2000)	3:31
11.	"On with the Show" (Mötley Crüe cover)	I <3 Metal (1999)	3:36
12.	"Ten Minutes" (Sub Pop Singles Club version)	"Ten Minutes" single (1999)	3:05
13.	"Anne Arbour" (Sub Pop Singles Club version)	"Ten Minutes" single	3:29
14.	"Burned Bridges" (Coalesce cover)	The Get Up Kids / Coalesce split (1997)	3:02
15.	"I'm a Loner Dottie, a Rebel" (demo)	Post Marked Stamps No. 4 (1997)	2:55
16.	"Shorty" (demo)	"Shorty"/"The Breathing Method" (1996)	3:24
17.	"The Breathing Method"	"Shorty"/"The Breathing Method" (1996)	4:44

== Personnel ==
Band

- Matt Pryor – guitar, vocals
- James Dewees – keyboards, vocals
- Jim Suptic – guitar, vocals
- Rob Pope – bass
- Ryan Pope – drums

Additional musicians

- Josh Berwanger – keyboards
- Noah Sikes – cello

Production

- Chad Blinman – producer, engineer, mixing
- Alex Brahl – vocals, producer, engineer
- Jay Gordon – engineer
- Dale Lawton – engineer
- AJ Mogis – producer, engineer
- Ed Rose – producer, engineer, mixing, photography
- Don Zientara – engineer

== Charts ==
Year	Album	Chart	Position
2001	Eudora	Top Heatseekers Chart	22
2001	Eudora	Independent Albums	18
