= There Are Rules =

Studio album by The Get Up Kids
- Released: January 25, 2011
- Recorded: 2009–2010
- Studios: Black Lodge, Eudora, Kansas
- Genres: Indie rock; new wave; post-punk
- Length: 41:59
- Label: Quality Hill
- Producer: Ed Rose

The Get Up Kids chronology
Simple Science (2010)	There Are Rules (2011)	Kicker (2018)

Singles from There Are Rules
- 1. "Automatic" Released: January 11, 2011; 2. "Rally 'Round the Fool" Released: October 10, 2011

There Are Rules is the fifth studio album by American rock band The Get Up Kids, the band's first studio album release since 2004's Guilt Show. After their initial reunion, the band decided to challenge themselves to write and record an album in only two weeks without using any digital technology. Ultimately, due to conflicting schedules, they dropped the two-week deadline and recorded over several months in 2009 and 2010. Much of the album was recorded in the same sessions as their first post-reunion release, Simple Science, the song "Keith Case" being featured on both.

== Background and production ==
The Get Up Kids released their fourth album Guilt Show in March 2004. They tried to promote it as much as they could prior to August, by which point vocalist/guitarist Matt Pryor had his second child, before going a break to focus on other projects. They returned briefly for a farewell tour in 2005, before breaking up, and eventually reuniting for shows in 2008 and 2009. In August and September 2009, they went on a European tour. After a show, they decided to start writing music together again – something they hadn't done since 2003. They worked on a lot of material at drummer Ryan Pope's home studio in Lawrence, Kansas. None of the members were allowed to bring in outside ideas, resulting in the songs stemming from jamming. By mid-August, they had two new songs, and was playing one of them live.

Pryor said the group didn't want to release an album, preferring to release material in a different manner that could accommodate their schedules. By mid-September, they had written and recorded nine songs in eleven days. In February 2010, the group announced a four-track EP for release in April. By its release, the single EP was expanded into a series of three EPs, with the second and third planned to appear halfway through, and towards the end, of the year. However, by July, it was revealed the group had scrapped the series due to writing more material; they had accumulated 15 songs by this point. The plan to release the EPs over a year was originally decided as the band was unsure if they would be touring. They decided to work towards an album, with a planned release in January or February 2011.

In the years away from the group, several members had gone on to join major-label acts; Rob Pope became the bassist for Spoon, and James Dewees became the touring keyboardist for My Chemical Romance. Because of these prior commitments, writing and recording sessions had to be scheduled long in advance. Sessions took place at Black Lodge Studios, which was co-owned by Ryan Pope and Ed Rose. The songs written at Pope's place were finished in the studio, a process that the group hadn't done prior. In contrast, for their debut, the band would play the songs over and over again before taking them to the studio. They tracked to 2" analogue tape, which forced the group to commit to their performances. The only song recorded in these sessions that has yet to be released is "Neverending", the first song written after the band's reunion.

== Composition ==
=== Overview ===
It drew comparisons in the tempo to early Pixies and experimental traces to that on U2's Achtung Baby (1991). Orange County Register said that Dewees left a dark wave "sonic stamp" all over the album; the album incorporated a more electronic sound than on the group's past releases, attributed to Rose's vintage Simmons drums. The writing process itself was more free-form than on previous albums, usually beginning with one member suggesting an instrumental part and building on it. If they didn't like the result in 30 minutes, they abandoned it. For instance, the song "Regent's Court" was written in one hour before Pryor had to pick his kids up from school. Pope and Dewees often came up with song structures, while Suptic and Pryor would provide input with the latter pair singing gibberish over the tracks. The Suptic-sung tracks "Automatic" and "Birmingham" began as jokes, whereas for the Pryor-sung tracks, he would go home and write lyrics for them. As they were streamlining things in the studio, Pope and Dewees honed in on the keyboard-centric material with a lot of effect pedal manipulation occurring.

The songs are a departure lyrically from the band's past work, due in large part to their attempts to make the album as unique from their past work as possible. Although the band has been known for writing heartfelt, emotional love songs, Pryor didn't want any songs about relationships on the album. "I felt like I could write love songs until I'm blue in the face and it's one of the things that this band has been known for to a certain degree. It's just to challenge myself as a songwriter to not write about anything that's formulaic for me." Pryor also didn't write lyrics until the songs were in a mostly completed state, making sure that the music aspect came first; "I had to write lyrics for ten songs at a time. No love songs; I had to have the lyrics fit the mood of the music."

=== Songs ===
The guitar riff at the start of "Tithe" was the first part written for the record, something that Pryor felt set the tone for the album. He said it showcased "other 'emotions' than just longing." "Regent's Court" was written at the end of the final record session in an attempt to write a new song in a short timeframe. Pryor said it had the most similarity to the group's back catalogue. "Shatter Your Lungs" talks about a kid falling off of a roof. Pryor said it had a similar song structure to some of the band's earlier pop-based songs such as "Mass Pike". "Automatic" features guitarist Jim Suptic on lead vocals. The bridge features HAL 9000 from the film 2001: A Space Odyssey (1968) doing call and response vocals. The title of "Pararelevant" was made up by Pryor; he said the guitars were Fugazi influenced. "Rally 'Round the Fool" was part of the first batch of songs written for the album, but was initially shelved. It was revived after the group got an Omnichord synthesizer, and made to sound like an old song by the Cure.

Both "Better Lie" and "Keith Case" are driven by the bass and drums. For the former, Pryor said "when the guitars do come in, they are for maximum impact." For the latter, the bass and drums have minimal changes, with the guitars and keyboard "do[ing] all the moving until the chorus." "The Widow Paris" is about a voodoo priestess. Pryor said the track was an intentional effort to sound different from any of their past songs, with the first half having a Latin feel to it. He added that his guitar tone was an attempt at emulating Drive Like Jehu. "Birmingham", which also features Suptic on lead vocals, was rewritten several times over; it talks about a street in the UK. "When It Dies" was initially written with Rob Pope on guitar and Pryor on synth bass. The track's outro took a period of time to finish as Suptic had written additional lyrics for it; the finished version used lyrics from both Suptic and Pryor. Immediately after "Rememorable" was written, Pryor knew it should be the final track on the album: "It’s a good, high-energy closer."

== Release ==
On October 29, 2010, There Are Rules was announced for release in January 2011. On November 23, "Regent's Court" premiered through Stereogum. On December 9, "Pararelevant" was posted online as a free download. On December 17, "Automatic" was posted on the group's Myspace account. The track was released as a 7" vinyl single on January 11, 2011. There Are Rules was released on January 25 through Quality Hill Records. The iTunes version came with the bonus track "Walk 'Em with Grace". Originally, the band wanted to release the album for free online through MySpace Music, working with former Sub Pop representative and Myspace Music head Jason Reynolds. However, after Reynolds left Myspace, he approached the band about self-distributing the album on their own label. The label was named after the historic Quality Hill neighborhood in the band's hometown of Kansas City, Missouri. According to Pryor, the move to their own label (along with the financial support provided by their other projects) has given them greater creative freedom than they previously had. "We’re not in the music rat race so much, so I think this record is us choosing to do something creative even if it ends up not being as popular as some of the poppier stuff."

Between January and March, the group went on a headlining US tour with support from Steel Train and River City Extension for the first half, while Miniature Tigers and Brian Bonz supported the second half. On February 15, a music video was released for "Automatic", directed by Brendan Costello. On March 15, the group appeared on Hoppus on Music performing "Rememorable" and "Shatter Your Lungs". On April 14, a music video was released for "Shatter Your Lungs", directed by Adam Rothlein. On June 1, a music video was released for "Regent's Court", which consists of found footage by director Pat Vamos. In June, the group went on a co-headlining US tour with Saves the Day, before going on a headlining tour through the Midwest in July. On July 6, a music video for "Rally 'Round the Fool" premiered through Paste, directed by Vamos. In August, the group went on a tour of Australia. "Rally 'Round the Fool" was released as a single on October 10, with "Past Is Past" as the B-side. Following their European tour engagements, the members returned to their solo projects (Pryor with May Day), played with other bands (Rob Pope with Spoon, and Dewees with My Chemical Romance), or had children (Suptic with his second child).

The band struggled with self-releasing their own music, eventually leading them to sign with Polyvinyl Record Co. for their later work. Speaking in 2019, Jim Suptic recalled "Three years after [There Are Rules] came out, one of our good friends said, 'you guys had a new record out?' How do you not know that! That really opened my eyes — one of our best friends doesn’t know we have a record out." Added Pryor, "We learned from the experience of putting a record out, that we’re just not good at it."

== Reception ==
Professional ratings
Aggregate scores
Source	Rating
Metacritic	62/100
Review scores
Source	Rating
AbsolutePunk	88%
AllMusic	4/5 stars
The A.V. Club	C+
Consequence of Sound	3.5/5 stars
Drowned in Sound	7/10
Now	2/5 stars
Pitchfork	5.4/10
Rock Sound	5/10
Spin	5/10 stars
Ultimate Guitar	7.3/10

The album received somewhat positive reception. It holds a 62 rating on Metacritic, denoting "mixed or average reviews". Pitchfork reviewer Ian Cohen praised the band for attempting to move their sound forward, but felt the results were somewhat aimless; "Gone are the band's geographic puns and tales of the romantic rigors of college freshman, but they're replaced by a professional anonymity that kinda sums up the problem with There Are Rules: When you spent the prime of your career trying to document the contours of post-teen torment, what happens when you no longer have a first-hand view?" Marc Hawthorne of The A.V. Club applauded the band's energy and new direction, but commented that the songwriting felt "undercooked". He was more positive overall than the Pitchfork reviewer, however, ending the review by saying "[t]here’s no doubt that these guys can still rock with all the heart-on-sleeve younguns they’ve influenced; now they just have to rediscover something worth writing home about."

However, some reviews were far more positive. In his review for Drowned in Sound, reviewer Tom Perry noted that the album was a major leap forward for the band; "The Get Up Kids of yore wouldn't have pulled off a song like 'Rally Around [sic] The Fool'. Before it would have had all the edge and menace of a kitten baring its teeth at you. Now they employ nuanced horror keyboards, digital ticks and big soundtrack guitars working the magic...It is a superb track that couldn't have been made if they'd stuck to a safer formula." Adam Pfleider of AbsolutePunk wrote a glowing review, while warning fans not to expect it to sound like the band's previous work; "Some of There Are Rules will be hard to swallow for many of the band's fans...The familiar nuances have been rearranged and built into something stronger, but the attitude and depth is all the same, if not more adhesive and much more endearing than before." One of the most positive takes came from Alternative Press, who gave the album four-and-a-half stars out of five; "There Are Rules truly stands out in the members' collective catalogs as a completely unique entity, and one that should be viewed as nothing less than an absolutely stunning success."

== Track listing ==
All tracks are written by The Get Up Kids.

There Are Rules
No.	Title	Length
1.	"Tithe"	3:39
2.	"Regent's Court"	2:06
3.	"Shatter Your Lungs"	2:49
4.	"Automatic"	2:55
5.	"Pararelevant"	3:37
6.	"Rally 'Round the Fool"	5:17
7.	"Better Lie"	4:18
8.	"Keith Case"	4:05
9.	"The Widow Paris"	3:37
10.	"Birmingham"	2:36
11.	"When It Dies"	4:04
12.	"Rememorable"	2:56
Total length:		41:59

Japanese/Australian/New Zealand bonus tracks
No.	Title	Length
13.	"Past Is Past"	3:51
14.	"Walk 'Em with Grace"	2:34
Total length:		48:24

There Are Rules (Deluxe Edition)
No.	Title	Length
1.	"Tithe"	3:39
2.	"Regent's Court"	2:06
3.	"Shatter Your Lungs"	2:49
4.	"Automatic"	2:55
5.	"Pararelevant"	3:37
6.	"Rally 'Round the Fool"	5:17
7.	"Better Lie"	4:18
8.	"Keith Case"	4:05
9.	"The Widow Paris"	3:37
10.	"Birmingham"	2:36
11.	"When It Dies"	4:04
12.	"Rememorable"	2:56
13.	"Your Petty Pretty Things"	3:28
14.	"Tommy Gentle"	2:31
15.	"How You're Bound"	6:02
16.	"Past is Past"	3:53
17.	"Walk 'Em With Grace"	2:33
18.	"Neverending"	3:27
Total length:		64:00

== Personnel ==
Band

- Matt Pryor – vocals, guitar, piano
- Jim Suptic – vocals, guitar
- Ryan Pope – drums
- Rob Pope – bass
- James Dewees – keyboards, vocals

Production

- Ed Rose – producer, engineering, mixing
- Bob Weston – mixing

Design

- Micah Smith – artwork

== Charts ==
Chart	Peak position
US Billboard 200	124
US Top Rock Albums	33
US Top Independent Albums	15
US Top Alternative Albums	22
US Top Tastemaker Albums	19
