= Guilt Show =

Studio album by The Get Up Kids
- Released: March 2, 2004
- Recorded: April–May, June–October 2003
- Studio: Black Lodge Studios; Matt Pryor's house; Rob Pope's basement; The Free State Brewery
- Genre: Alternative rock; indie rock; emo
- Length: 45:40
- Label: Vagrant
- Producer: Ed Rose

The Get Up Kids chronology
On a Wire (2002)	Guilt Show (2004)	Simple Science (2010)

Singles from Guilt Show
- 1. "Wouldn't Believe It" Released: January 21, 2004

Guilt Show is the fourth studio album by American rock band The Get Up Kids. It was released on Vagrant Records on March 2, 2004.

== Background ==
The Get Up Kids released their third album On a Wire in May 2002 through independent label Vagrant Records. The album marked a musical shift away from their earlier work; despite being critically lauded, fan reaction to it was highly negative. While touring the album, the material came across as too mellow and quiet, which made for lackluster live performances, according to vocalist/guitarist Matt Pryor. In August, the group went on a European tour, playing shows in Germany, Belgium and the UK. The tour was to include additional shows in Italy, Switzerland and Amsterdam, but were left out due to time constraints. They were also due to perform shows as part of a Vagrant Records tour in the US, as well as further European shows, but were abandoned due to scheduling conflicts, resulting in the band staying at home. They began writing material for a new album, and by October, accumulated 12 potential song ideas. Around this time, they were in the middle of acquiring the studio Red House Recordings in Eudora, Kansas.

The band had previously made albums in places such as Chicago, Los Angeles and Bridgeport, and wanted to make one near to their home. The opportunity to purchase Red House came about when they wanted to work more with Ed Rose, who they had known for several years, and asked the owner if he wanted to sell it. To help fund the purchase, the group sold their Heroes & Villains Records imprint to Vagrant Records, citing a lack of responsibility and interest in it, in addition to Vagrant wanting 100% ownership of its releases. During some midwestern US shows in November and December, and Canadian shows in March, the band debuted two new songs: "Wouldn't Believe It" and "Sick in Her Skin". In December, the band and Rose had ownership of Red House, which they renamed Black Lodge Studios. Following this, they began renovating it into a state-of-the-art studio. During this time, the band were in the process of demoing material.

== Recording ==
Guilt Show was recorded at Black Lodge Studios with Rose as the producer, in addition to acting as engineer. Despite having worked with the band for the previous six years, it marked the first time he produced an album for them. The group began doing pre-production in April 2003, listening to around 20 demos at drummer Ryan Pope's house. By the end of the month, they had tracked scratch guitar and vocals for 13 songs. The process consisted of Pryor playing to a click track, Rose and Pope would build drum tracks over. By early May, the drums were recorded for 13 songs, with guitar, bass and vocals only being finished for a few of them. Around this time, Jason Russell of Hot Rod Circuit was in the city to practice with Pryor's other band the New Amsterdams, and ended up singing on "Man of Conviction", the only track finished up to that point.

The group took a short two week break as most of the members went on holiday. They began tracking again in early June, and continued into July. They worked on some new songs, alongside a few by guitarist Jim Suptic. The members initially listened to the demos of these new songs and thought how to approach them, before playing them in the studio's live room as a full group, marking it one of a handful of times the whole band were in the studio together for the album. At the end of June, keyboardist James Dewees tracked his parts; he had little time to do this due to his project Reggie and the Full Effect was due to start touring in early July. Overall, Dewees finished around 95% of his parts before embarking on tour.

Suptic laid down his guitar parts in August while both the New Amsterdams and Reggie were on tour. Pryor later recorded piano, for "The Dark Night of the Soul", and backing vocals, for "Holy Roman", at his home in Lawrence, Kansas. Pryor and Rob Pope recorded a drum machine and vocals for "Is There a Way Out" in the basement of Pope's house. Rob and Ryan Pope recorded bar noise for "Martyr Me" at The Free State Brewery. Jeremy Goldstein, who worked at Quadrant 5 Studios, did sound manipulation on "The Dark Night of the Soul". Recording wrapped up in October with 58 days in total spent recording; 18 songs had been tracked altogether. Shortly afterwards, Rose mixed the recordings. After the track sequence was approved by Vagrant Records, it was sent off for mastering by Mike Fossenkemper at Turtle Tone Studios in October and November.

== Composition ==
During much of the writing, Suptic was on his honeymoon, and Dewees was far less involved in the initial writing process. However, this gave brothers Rob and Ryan Pope a more substantial role in writing the album than they had previously had. The album was far less collaborative than their previous works, many songs being written and demoed by Pryor, then fleshed out by the rest of the band. During the writing, the group was listening to the Clash and Elvis Costello and the Attractions. They wanted more upbeat songs that would work well live, citing a return to the sound of Something to Write Home About (1999). Pryor was at the happiest point of his life up to that point, but thought that it would not work well lyrically and started writing about other people's relationships. He claimed there was "hardly" anything on the album relating to his life. He stated that Pope's divorce was "pretty heavy shit to have gone through. So yeah, it made for good lyrical fodder." Pope said the theme and overall tone of the songs changed following it: "It made everyone step back and go, 'Wow. Okay.' It's a big thing." Additionally, a lot of the album talks about conflict between friends.

The album's title stemmed from an occasion where Rob Pope and Rose were driving to the studio. They passed a church that said "annual quilt show", which the pair misread as "annual guilt show". Discussing the meaning, Pryor said there was a lot of lyrics referring to "betrayal in one form or another, and guilt seems to go hand-in-hand with betrayal." "The One You Want" is about a woman that Pryor wishes he never met: "She sucks the soul out of people, and she spends all of my friend's money on drugs and stupid sh--." He referred to it as "'77 era" power pop. "Wouldn't Believe" is about an occurrence of adultery that eventually ends in divorce. Pryor found "Holy Roman" to be a departure from his usual writings due to its political nature. It was influenced by him becoming a father, stating his awareness of the political climate in the world outside of life in a band. "How Long Is Too Long" talks about a man who sleeps with another guy's partner. The track was the first of two written during the On a Wire sessions, but were left off as they didn't fit the style of that record. "Sympathy", the second track written during the On a Wire sessions, has been referred to by Pryor as "'97 era" indie rock. Pryor compared the drums on "Conversation" to Led Zeppelin.

== Release and promotion ==
On October 8, 2003, the album's track listing was revealed, followed by the album's title, Guilt Show, on October 22. On November 11, the album was announced for release in March 2004. In early January, the album's artwork was posted on Vagrant Records' website. It was made by Sean T; Pryor found it to much simpler than the "incredibly complicated" artwork of On a Wire. He thought the inside layout, which consists of a photo by Dan Monick, was reminiscent of Twin Peaks. Also during January, the band were due to release an EP of two songs from the forthcoming album alongside alternative versions of other songs, but was cancelled when it was decided that the band would be better off releasing the songs online. "Martyr Me" was posted online as a free download on January 12, followed by "Wouldn't Believe It" on January 19.

The EP was later superseded by the Japan-exclusive "Wouldn't Believe It" single, released on January 21. It featured "Martyr Me", "Wouldn't Believe It", and acoustic versions of "I'll Catch You" and "Wish You Were Here". The group had planned to release the rest of the album's songs on a weekly basis, but due to the record leaking, the remainder of it was posted online on January 19. In addition, a music video for "Man of Conviction" was released on the same day. It featured photos of the band on tour, in the studio, among others. Guilt Show was released on March 2 through Vagrant Records. The CD included a link to a private website that features pictures, information on the creation of the songs, as well as demos. To promote its release, the band did four in-store performances, and appeared on the Late Show with David Letterman, Late Night with Conan O'Brien, and IMX.

Professional ratings
Aggregate scores
Source	Rating
Metacritic	70/100
Review scores
Source	Rating
AllMusic	4/5 stars
The A.V. Club	Favorable
Billboard	Favorable
Blender	3/5 stars
Entertainment Weekly	Favorable
Melodic	3/5 stars
PopMatters	Favorable
Spin	3/5 stars
Rolling Stone	2/5 stars
Stylus Magazine	C+

On March 25, the iTunes Session EP was released exclusively through the iTunes Store and featured softer, acoustic versions of some of the album's songs. In March and April, the group went on a headlining US tour with support from Recover and Rocky Votolato. On April 29, a music video for "The One You Want" was posted on Vagrant's website. It was filmed during a weekend in Cincinnati, Ohio and sees the group performing in a diner with 60 people dancing around them. In May and June, the band supported Dashboard Confessional and Thrice on the Honda Civic Tour. Following this, the group played shows in Japan, the UK and Canada. The group tried to get as much promotion for the album as they could before August, by which point Pryor had his second child, and the band went on a break to focus on other projects.

== Reception ==
Guilt Show charted at number 58 on the Billboard 200 and number 3 on the Independent Albums charts. Spartanburg Herald-Journal include the album on their list of the best albums of the year.

== Track listing ==
Track listing per booklet.

No.	Title	Length
1.	"Man of Conviction"	1:34
2.	"The One You Want"	3:15
3.	"Never Be Alone"	3:17
4.	"Wouldn't Believe It"	3:47
5.	"Holy Roman"	2:51
6.	"Martyr Me"	3:26
7.	"How Long Is Too Long"	2:25
8.	"Sick in Her Skin"	4:25
9.	"In Your Sea"	3:02
10.	"Sympathy"	3:09
11.	"The Dark Night of the Soul"	3:01
12.	"Is There a Way Out"	6:20
13.	"Conversation"	4:56
Total length:		45:30

== Personnel ==
Personnel per booklet, except where noted.

The Get Up Kids

- Matt Pryor – lead vocals, guitar
- Jim Suptic – guitar, vocals
- Ryan Pope – drums
- Rob Pope – bass
- James Dewees – keyboards, vocals

Additional musician

- Jason Russell – additional vocals (track 1)

Production

- Ed Rose – producer, engineer, mixing
- Matt Pryor – recording (tracks 5, 11 and 12)
- Rob Pope – recording (tracks 6 and 12)
- Ryan Pope – recording (track 12)
- Jeremy Goldstein – sound manipulation (track 11)
- Dan Monick – inside photo
- Sean T. – cover design
- Mike Fossenkemper – mastering

== Charts ==
Charts (2004)	Peak position
US Billboard 200	58
US Independent Albums (Billboard)	3
