= Something to Write Home About =

Studio album by the Get Up Kids
- Released: September 28, 1999
- Recorded: June–July 1999
- Studios: Mad Hatter, Silverlake, California
- Genres: Emo; indie rock; pop-punk
- Length: 45:26
- Labels: Vagrant, Heroes & Villains
- Producers: The Get Up Kids; Chad Blinman; Alex Brahl

The Get Up Kids chronology
Red Letter Day (1999)	Something to Write Home About (1999)	Central Standard Time/Vasil + Bluey (1999)

Singles from Something to Write Home About
- 1. "Action & Action" Released: March 24, 2000

Something to Write Home About is the second studio album by American emo band the Get Up Kids, released on September 28, 1999, through Vagrant Records and the band's own label Heroes & Villains Records. Following the promotional tours for their debut album Four Minute Mile (1997), the band were in discussion with Mojo Records. During this period, James Dewees joined as the band's keyboardist. As negotiations with the label eventually stalled, they eventually went with Vagrant Records. They recorded their next album at Mad Hatter Studios in Silver Lake, Los Angeles, California, co-producing it with Chad Blinman and Alex Brahl. Described as an emo album, Something to Write Home About branches out from the harder edge of its predecessor, with frontman Matt Pryor citing the works of the Foo Fighters, Jimmy Eat World and Wilco as influences.

Something to Write Home About received generally favourable reviews from music critics, with many praising the songwriting. The album was a commercial success, selling over 100,000 copies, and peaking at number 31 on the Billboard Heatseekers Albums chart in the United States. The band promoted it with a European tour and a US tour with At the Drive-In until the end of 1999. "Action & Action" was released as the lead single from the album. Later that year, the band toured across Australia, Japan, Europe, ending with a headlining US tour; in early 2001 they supported Green Day and Weezer.

The success of Something to Write Home About made Vagrant Records one of the major players in the fledgling emo scene, attracting bands like Dashboard Confessional, Saves the Day, and Alkaline Trio to sign with the label. It is often cited as one of the best albums of the second-wave movement of emo, and is cited as an influence on third wave acts like Coheed & Cambria. Publications such as Kerrang!, LA Weekly and NME, among others, have included the album on best-of lists for the emo and pop-punk genres. It was re-released as a CD and DVD set in 2008, and has been re-pressed on vinyl in 2015 and 2016; the 2015 version charted at number 16 on the Billboard Vinyl Albums chart.

== Background and writing ==
With the release of the Woodson EP in 1997, the Get Up Kids signed a two-album recording contract with independent label Doghouse Records. In June 1997, the group went on a tour of the United States, on which they became friends with Coalesce. Shortly afterwards, their drummer, James Dewees, moved in with the bassist Rob Pope and his brother, drummer Ryan Pope. When the Get Up Kids went on tour, Dewees would look after the apartment. The group released their debut album, Four Minute Mile, in September 1997. It was supported by American and European tours between September 1997 and May 1998. The group then went on a break and spent the next few months writing material for their next record. Four Minute Mile, sold over 40,000 copies, which attracted attention from various labels.

The band, who wanted to leave Doghouse, began discussions with other labels, such as Geffen, Vagrant and Mojo Records. Starting from December 1998, the group wrote a batch of new material as they were waiting for their deal with Mojo Records to be finalized. The Pope brothers' apartment had a piano that Dewees would often play; while the group were practising a song at the apartment, Dewees showed them a vocal harmony and piano part he had come up with. The group had wanted a keyboardist for sometime; with Coalesce having gone on hiatus during this period, Dewees joined as their keyboard player.

By April 1999, tired that the negotiations with Mojo Records had taken too long and eventually came to a halt, the band felt it wasn't the right time to be signing with a major. Vocalist/guitarist Matthew Pryor later revealed that the label's founder Jay Rifkin wanted to treat the band as a new act, own the rights to their music publishing, in addition to being unwilling to buy the band out of their contract with Doghouse. To get out of their Doghouse contract, the band recorded the Red Letter Day EP and forfeited the vinyl rights to their following album. That same month, they formed their own record label, Heroes & Villains Records, which signed a deal with Vagrant Records, giving the latter rights to other acts signed to Heroes & Villains, which included the members' solo projects. At the time, Vagrant was searching for a flagship band on which they could expand their business with.

== Recording and production ==
In June 1999, the band travelled from Kansas City, Missouri to Los Angeles, California to record their next album. Before the group could start, Vagrant Records' co-owner Jon Cohen had to borrow money from his parents, who mortgaged their house in order to fund the sessions. The album was recorded over the course of six weeks in June and July 1999 at Mad Hatter Studios in Silver Lake, Los Angeles. The band would spend the daytime at the studio and spend nights at a friend's house. They produced the record themselves, with co-producers Chad Blinman and Alex Brahl, the latter of which did additional engineering. Blinman handled recording, while Dale Lawton served as an assistant. Blinman mixed the recordings, while the album was mastered by Ramon Breton at Oceanview Mastering. Several of the songs included were re-recorded from past releases: "Red Letter Day" from the Red Letter Day EP, "Ten Minutes" on a 7" vinyl for the Sub Pop Singles Club and "I'm a Loner Dottie, a Rebel" for a split release with Braid.

== Music and lyrics ==
Something to Write Home About is an emo and pop-punk album that takes influence from 1960s pop and 1980s new wave. Ian Cohen of Stereogum described the album in the context of the band's contemporaries: "Braid and the Promise Ring were too quirky, Saves The Day hadn’t quite shed their hardcore origins, and Texas Is The Reason and Mineral were too artsy and esoteric". He added that Something to Write Home About "occup[ied] that perfect nexus between punk, emo, indie rock, and pure power-pop". When making the album, the band tried to consciously expand their sound from the harder edge of Four Minute Mile. Pryor cites Wilco's Summerteeth (1999), Jimmy Eat World's Clarity (1999) and the Foo Fighters' The Colour and the Shape as primary influences in writing new material. While the group had toyed with keyboards on Four Minute Mile, they incorporated more of it with the inclusion of Dewees into the band. According to Pryor, they had been listening to Weezer a lot and wanted more synthesizer parts, with Dewees being "such a talented piano player, he just sort of upped the ante." Dewees' keyboard parts recalled the work of Duran Duran, which PopMatters music critic Dave Meehan said "provide a melodic counterpoint to [...] Suptic's thrashing and give the whole album a party-like-its-1983 feel". The album incorporates quiet-loud dynamics and sing-along choruses. The tracks have been described as "energetic bursts of emotional angst."

Pryor also began to branch out lyrically, including on “Red Letter Day,” which was written about the bands’ negative experiences with Dirk Hemsmath and Doghouse Records. In writing the album, the band was also more conscious of traditional pop song structure, focusing more on hooks and placing less emphasis on long instrumental sections. Ryan Pope made a conscious effort to restrain his drum parts on the album, emulating Charlie Watts and Jim Keltner, stating that it was more "important to maybe make some sacrifices for the tune instead of pounding away and thinking of yourself as an individual player." Pryor would later remark that he wished the songs were tuned a half-step or a whole step down as he was yelling at the top of his vocal range throughout the album. The staff of Kerrang! called it "a formidable open wound of a record."

The album's title, Something to Write Home About, was suggested by Suptic. The opening fast-paced track "Holiday" starts with a guitar pick slide; Meehan said "Action and Action" was "another done-me-wrong, finger-pointing tale". Niko Stratis of Spin referred to "Valentine" as a "perfect snapshot of the way any distance, emotional or physical, feels oceanic in scope". The acoustic "Out of Reach" crescendos into a piano-led torch song. The power pop song "Ten Minutes" is a homage to be stuck in traffic on the way to a lover's residence, and features Suptic on lead vocals. "The Company Dime" features call-and-response vocals during the chorus sections; "My Apology" is a mid-tempo song. "I'm a Loner Dottie, a Rebel" discusses the aftermath of a one-night stand, while its title is a quote from Pee-wee's Big Adventure (1985). The country-esque "Close to Home" is followed by the album's closing song "I'll Catch You"; the latter opens with a piano part and sees a person talking with someone they admire.

== Release and promotion ==
In August and September 1999, the group went on a European tour; the tour was planned to last a month, however, the group only got to play six shows over eight days. Following this, the band appeared at the CMJ MusicFest. Something to Write Home About was released on September 28 through Vagrant and Heroes & Villains Records. The vinyl version was released through Doghouse Records. The Japanese version included "Forgive and Forget" and a cover of "Regret" by New Order as bonus tracks, while the European version featured included a re-recorded version of "Forgive and Forget" and "Central Standard Time" (taken from a split with the Anniversary). The album's artwork is a painting that depicts two robots cuddling on a sofa. In October and November, the group went on a US tour with At the Drive-In. A music video was released for "Action & Action" through music retailer Insound in December 1999.

In February 2000, the Get Up Kids played a one-off show in Kansas before embarking on a Japanese tour. The band then went on a tour of Australia with Jebediah in March and April. The album was released through Epitaph Europe in Europe on March 13. "Action & Action" was released as a single on March 24 in Europe with a demo of "I'm a Loner Dottie, I'm a Rebel" and a cover of The Cure's "Close to Me" as B-sides. The group went on a European tour in May and June with the Anniversary. In September and October, the band went on a headlining US tour with support from the Anniversary, Koufax and Jebediah. It was sponsored by the peer-to-peer file sharing network Napster, who had helped people discover the band and other Vagrant Records' acts. In January 2001, the group supported Green Day on their US tour, before supporting Weezer in February and March.

=== Reissues ===
In 2008, Pryor said that the group was in discussions with Vagrant Records to re-release the album as a 10th anniversary package, including a DVD and photo booklet. In February 2009, Doghouse Records re-pressed the album on vinyl. The 10th anniversary edition was released on September 8, which included a DVD with a recording of their first show in a few years and a documentary on the making of the album. In addition, it included 7 downloadable demo recordings from the sessions. Doghouse has since re-pressed the album on vinyl twice more, in 2015 and 2016, respectively.

== Critical reception ==
Professional ratings
Review scores
Source	Rating
AllMusic	4.5/5 stars
Drowned in Sound	9/10
Kerrang!	5/5 stars
Melody Maker	4/5 stars
NME	7/10
Pitchfork	2.0/10 (1999); 7.6/10 (2024)
PopMatters	8/10
Record Collector	4/5 stars
The Rolling Stone Album Guide	4/5 stars
Spin	6/10

Something to Write Home About was met with generally favourable reviews from music critics upon release. Drowned in Sound writer James Skinner complimented the band members for "how brilliantly [they] play off each other," coupled with a "healthy dose of longing and you're halfway there in terms of understanding its appeal". Reviewing the album for MTV News, critic Kembrew McLeod wrote that the band are "certainly not purveyors of bubble-punk in the same mold as Green Day or Blink-182, but they never forget the sheer pleasure that the right sequence of notes or the perfect harmony brings". PopMatters contributor Rob Browning wrote that the album retaining the "edge of their Doghouse past, but sported cleaner production and more hooks than a tackle box". He went on to say that these "12 songs are the strongest body of works they had been able to muster prior or since". Meehan said the band offer "each song enough individual care to let them stand on their own while still bowing to the album's coherent feel and rush". The staff at Impact Press considered it superior to the band's debut, stating that the "tunes are absolutely absorbing, sucking you into the hooks, the energy, the drive, the music".

Spin writer Andrew Beaujon found the band to be "peppy enough to make even a college sophomore feel old," adding that they sound "exactly like Superchunk". Elmar Salmutter of Ox-Fanzine said it was a "strong and varied record that's just right for the beginning of autumn". In a review for Consumable Online, writer Kerwin So said in order to hear a "few pretty good songs, you have to wade through a deluge of sappy filler". LAS Magazine founder Eric J. Herboth said that like their debut, Something was "complete bunk" aside from the two "great" songs "Red Letter Day" and "I'm a Loner Dottie, a Rebel". Pitchfork's Brent DiCrescenzo noted a lack of originality in the music, writing that "implementation of keyboards and acoustic guitars is predictable and unimpressive", calling the release "an entire album of songs which follow the same formula, yet never reach the quasi- memorable qualities of a radio hit."

AllMusic reviewer Zac Johnson noted that despite the band "struggling with stumbling relationships," they were still capable of "process[ing] the complexities of their daily lives through music". Stevie Chick of NME said that if the lyrics "sometimes seem a little clumsy or overwrought, that's all part of the package". DiCrescenzo referred to the words as "meaningless lyrics masquerading as poetic insight"; Nude as the News writer Ed Comstock felt the band had "regressed lyrically – to such an extent that songs that are otherwise great are nearly ruined by lyrical banality". DiCrescenzo mentioned that the "clinical production scrubs the rock down to a smooth grain of clear sand". So thought it was a mistake to switch producers as the "entire record has a thoroughly bland, almost adult-contemporary texture to it". Comstock, on the other hand, noted an improvement of production from their first album. He mentioned that the addition of Dewees made the album come across as "predictable – while some of the songs seemed more complete and polished, many have simply lost their edge".

In a retrospective review, Mischa Pearlman of Record Collector felt that the album "still holds up, its power and impact remaining as profound as ever". In a 2017 retrospective of Four Minute Mile, Vice Media's Eduardo Cepeda called Something to Write Home About "a masterful follow-up to their unfussy debut." When reviewing the band's Kicker EP, Pitchfork writer Ian Cohen wrote much more fondly about the album:

"Put aside the love songs, and their classic Something to Write Home About can be read as a concept album about the pressure of seeing then-fledgling indie label Vagrant literally bet the farm on their success. But they also wrote concisely and passionately about girls, heartbreak, and trouble with authority, thus setting the norms for 21st-century emo: While the band’s presentation and ethics were overtly punk, their songs harkened back to early rock’n’roll records that functioned as teen pop."

== Commercial performance ==
Something to Write Home About charted at number 31 on the Billboard Heatseekers Albums chart. By 2002, the album had sold 150,000 copies. In 2015, it charted at number 16 on the Billboard Vinyl Albums chart. The album's success was the first major breakthrough for Vagrant Records, and made the Get Up Kids the label's "flagship band", attracting other artists to sign with the company.

== Legacy and influence ==
The album has appeared on many best-of lists for the emo and pop-punk genres, by publications such as LA Weekly, Junkee, NME, and On the A Side, as well as by journalists Leslie Simon and Trevor Kelley in their book Everybody Hurts: An Essential Guide to Emo Culture (2007). Similarly, "Action & Action" appeared on a best-of emo songs list by Vulture. Spin featured both “I’ll Catch You” and “Valentine” on its list of the 40 best Emo love songs of all time. In 2014, as part of 10-year celebrations for Riot Fest, the band performed the album in its entirety. In 2015, Rock Sound included it in their 101 Modern Classics list at number 97. They later ranked it at number 102 on the list of best albums in their lifetime. Kerrang! listed ‘’Something to Write Home About’’ as the 19th greatest pop-punk album of all time, and the 42nd best punk album of all time.

Something to Write Home About is credited with establishing Vagrant Records as an emo music industry powerhouse. Acts such as Dashboard Confessional, Saves the Day, and Alkaline Trio all signed to the label because of the album's success. The album has been viewed as an important release for the second wave of emo, and an influence on the third wave of acts, such as Coheed & Cambria, while Dan Campbell of the Wonder Years has expressed admiration for it. Ryan De Freitas of Kerrang! stated that the album "paved the way for a thousand sappy, hopeless romantic pop punk bands to make a career out of writing songs about the ‘friendzone’, but let’s not hold that against it, eh?"

== Track listing ==
All tracks are written by The Get Up Kids

No.	Title	Length
1.	"Holiday"	3:29
2.	"Action & Action"	4:05
3.	"Valentine"	4:19
4.	"Red Letter Day"	2:56
5.	"Out of Reach"	3:46
6.	"Ten Minutes"	3:12
7.	"The Company Dime"	4:06
8.	"My Apology"	3:24
9.	"I'm a Loner Dottie, a Rebel"	3:08
10.	"Long Goodnight"	4:48
11.	"Close to Home"	3:50
12.	"I'll Catch You"	4:22

== Personnel ==
Personnel per booklet.

The Get Up Kids

- Jim Suptic – guitar, vocals
- Ryan Pope – drums
- James Dewees – keyboards, vocals
- Rob Pope – bass
- Matthew Pryor – guitar, vocals

Production and design

- The Get Up Kids – producer
- Chad Blinman – co-producer, recording, mixing
- Alex Brahl – co-producer, additional engineer
- Dale Lawton – assistant
- Ramon Breton – mastering
- Travis M. Millard – cover painting, inside painting
- Sam Spencer – design, layout

== Charts ==
Original release
Chart (1999)	Peak position
US Heatseekers Albums (Billboard)	31

Reissue
Chart (2015)	Peak position
US Vinyl Albums (Billboard)	16
