= The Get Up Kids =

American emo band

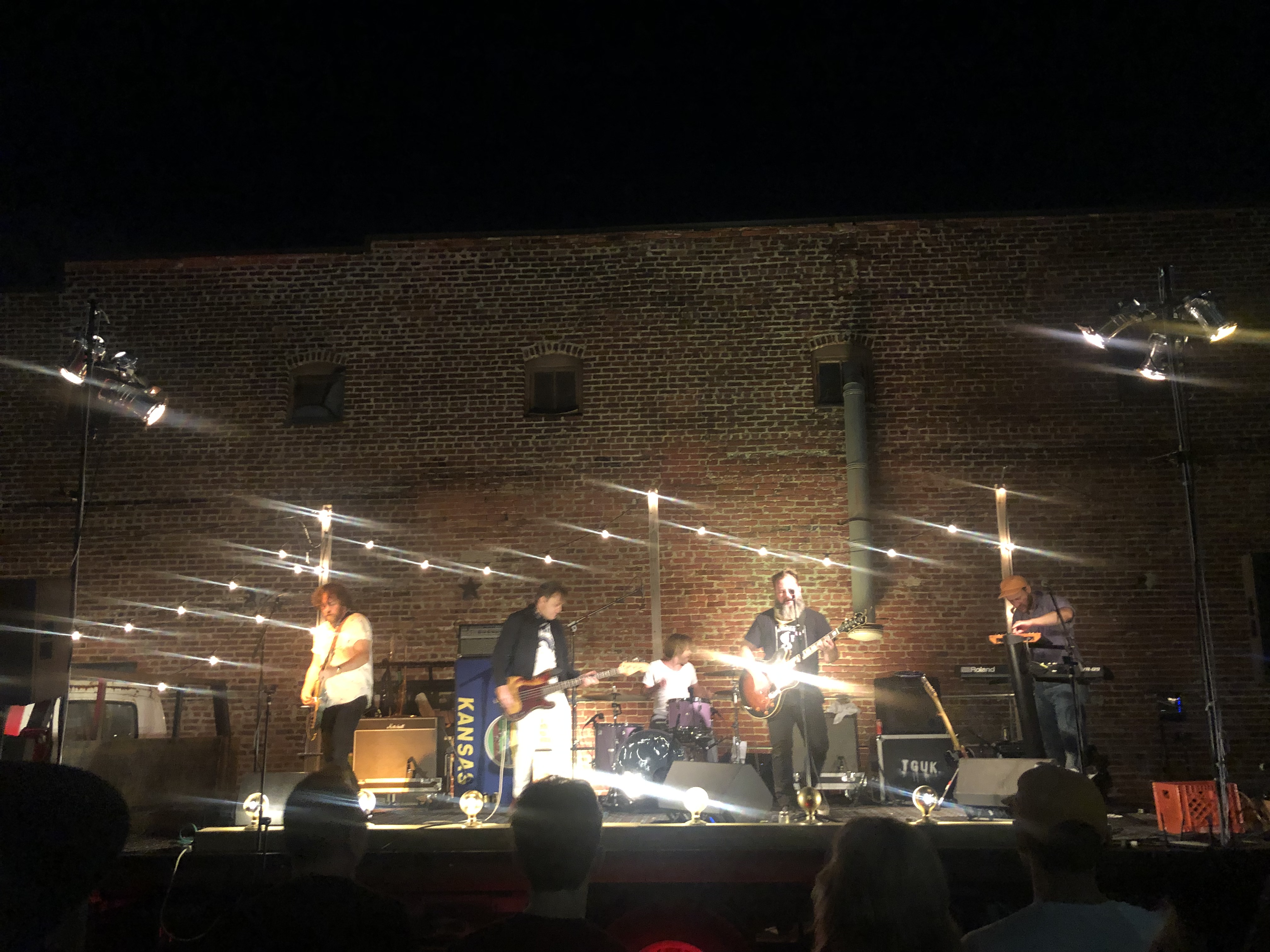
- The Get Up Kids performing in 2021

Background information
- Origin: Kansas City, U.S.
- Genres: Midwest emo; emo; indie rock; alternative rock; emo pop; pop-punk
- Years active: 1995–2005, 2008–present
- Labels: Doghouse; Vagrant; Simple Psyence; Epitaph; Quality Hill; Polyvinyl; Big Scary Monsters
- Spinoffs: Reggie and the Full Effect; The New Amsterdams; The Terrible Twos; White Whale; Blackpool Lights
- Members: Matt Pryor; Jim Suptic; Rob Pope; Ryan Pope; Dustin Kinsey
- Past members: Nathan Shay; Thomas Becker; James Dewees
- Website: thegetupkids.com

The Get Up Kids are an American second wave emo band from Kansas City. Formed in 1995, the band is a major act in the mid-1990s second wave emo scene. Their second album Something to Write Home About remains their most widely acclaimed album, and is considered to be one of the quintessential albums of the second-wave emo movement. They are considered forefathers of the emo genre, and have been widely credited as being an influence, both by contemporaries Saves the Day and later bands such as Fall Out Boy, Taking Back Sunday and the Wonder Years.

As they gained prominence, they began touring with bands such as Green Day and Weezer before becoming headliners themselves, eventually embarking on international tours of Japan and Europe. They founded Heroes & Villains Records, an imprint of the successful indie rock label Vagrant Records. While the imprint's original purpose was to release albums by the Get Up Kids, it served as a launching pad for several side-projects such as the New Amsterdams and Reggie and the Full Effect.

The band departed heavily from their established style with the release of their 2002 album On a Wire, which saw the band take on a much more layered, alternative rock sound. Like many early emo bands, the Get Up Kids sought to dissociate themselves from the label.

Due to internal conflicts, the band broke up in 2005. Three years later, the band reunited to support the tenth anniversary re-release of Something to Write Home About, and soon afterward entered the studio to write new material. In early 2010, the band released Simple Science, their first release in six years, followed in 2011 by the full-length There Are Rules. Their most recent studio album, Problems, which was seen by many as a return to their early style, was released in 2019.

== History ==
=== Early years (1995–1997) ===
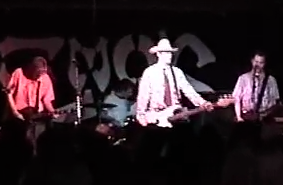
The Get Up Kids performing at Emo's in 1997

While in high school, Ryan Pope, Rob Pope, and Jim Suptic formed a short-lived band called Kingpin. Matt Pryor had been writing songs since he was a teenager, and was playing in a band called Secret Decoder Ring. Following the demise of the two bands in 1995, the Get Up Kids were formed. The band originally planned on calling themselves the Suburban Get Up Kids until reasoning that there were fewer band names beginning with the letter 'G' than there are with the letter 'S', and that therefore they were more likely to be noticed in a record store if their name began with a 'G'. The band was formed on October 14, 1995, on Suptic's 18th birthday. They played their first show supporting Mineral on the same night as their high school prom.

At the time the lineup consisted of Pryor on guitar and lead vocals, Suptic on guitar, Rob Pope on bass, and Thomas Becker on drums. However, Becker soon left for college in California, and was replaced by Nathan Shay, who was attending school with Suptic at the Kansas City Art Institute. In 1995, Pryor, Suptic, and friend Kevin Zelko saved money to self-release "Shorty/The Breathing Method", their first 7-inch. However, due to an unwillingness to tour, Shay was replaced by Rob's younger brother Ryan in April 1996.

The band became increasingly popular in the burgeoning underground Midwestern music scene, forming strong relationships with bands such as Rocket Fuel Is the Key, Coalesce and Braid. After the "Shorty" 7-inch, the band released "A Newfound Interest in Massachusetts" on Contrast Records. Encouraged by interest stirred by the band's first 7-inch, they recorded their first EP, Woodson. Shortly afterward, Contrast Records released a 7-inch titled "A Newfound Interest in Massachusetts", with Doghouse Records releasing a CD-EP version which combined both 7-inches. After Woodson, Doghouse approached the band with a two-album contract, offering them $4,000 to record their first full-length album.

=== Four Minute Mile (1997–1998) ===
After signing to Doghouse, the band drove to Chicago to record their debut full-length album with producer Bob Weston of Shellac. The album was recorded in only two days, with the band leaving on Friday after Ryan Pope got out of school and finishing in the early hours of Sunday morning. Two months after recording the album, the band embarked on their first national tour with Braid and Ethel Meserve with the first date of the tour taking place the day after Ryan's high school graduation.

It was on that tour that the band met James Dewees, the new drummer for Coalesce while the bands were playing together in Wilkes-Barre, Pennsylvania. After the show, the members of the two bands became close friends, eventually leading them to record a split 7-inch produced by Ed Rose entitled "The Get Up Kids / Coalesce". For the split, each band covered one of the other's songs in their own style. Coalesce did a post-hardcore cover of "Second Place", and the Get Up Kids recorded a power-pop rendition of "Harvest of Maturity".

The band continued to tour relentlessly, making connections with the likes of Jimmy Eat World, Mineral, and Boys Life, largely playing basement shows and building a dedicated fan base through word of mouth. In September 1997 the band released their debut full-length record Four Minute Mile. The album sold over 40,000 copies in two years, a major feat for such a small label, which began to bring attention from larger labels. The band was invited to join Braid on their 1998 tour of Europe, their first tour outside of the contiguous United States.

While the band was receiving rapidly increasing national and international attention, they became unhappy with Doghouse Records' ability to keep up with the increasing popularity of the band. The Get Up Kids' announcement to leave Doghouse Records brought interest from prominent record labels including Sub Pop, Geffen and Mojo Records. The band made a decision to sign to Mojo, but before the contracts were signed, they began to have second thoughts. The main issue was over the label's insistence on owning merchandising rights, a large source of the band's income. Moreover, the band was insulted the label requested they re-record "Don't Hate Me" from Four Minute Mile for their next record, feeling that the label believed it was "the best that [they could] write". Before the deal with Mojo was official, the band met Rich Egan, founder of Los Angeles–based Vagrant Records. He convinced the band to sign to Vagrant instead, offering them $50,000 to record a second album, as well as their own imprint, Heroes & Villains Records. Reflecting on the decision in 2000, Rob Pope said, "...the more we thought about it, the more we realized that we wanted our band to have a career, not just one big shot where you put everything into one record."

=== Something to Write Home About (1999–2001) ===
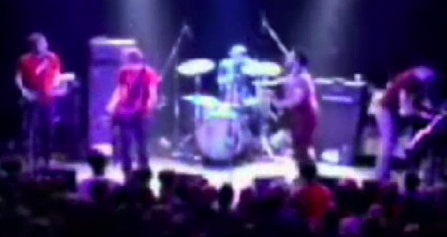
The Get Up Kids performing at the Bowery Ballroom in 2000

In 1998, James Dewees recorded his first solo album under the pseudonym Reggie and the Full Effect. While Dewees wrote the songs himself, he asked Matt Pryor and Rob Pope to help record some of the instrumentals. The resulting album, Greatest Hits 1984–1987 leaned heavily on the use of synthesizer keyboards for its sound. Their work together on the Reggie and the Full Effect album led Pryor to invite Dewees to collaborate with the Get Up Kids on Red Letter Day, a five-track EP produced by Ed Rose to fulfill their two-record deal with Doghouse. The cleaner, more focused sound of the EP provided the chance to experiment with the inclusion of keyboards and acts as a sonic bridge between the raw sound of Four Minute Mile and the more dynamic, produced style of their next studio album.

After the release of Red Letter Day, Dewees became a full-time member as the band began recording their second studio album in Los Angeles in June 1999 with producer Alex Brahl. Before the album went into production, Vagrant Records co-owner John Cohen borrowed money from his parents, who had mortgaged their house in order to fund the production of the album. On September 21, 1999, the band released Something to Write Home About on Vagrant Records. The album's lyrics reflected the record label strife the band had experienced and their distance between friends and family back home after their move to Los Angeles. Something to Write Home About has been singled out as the band's only 'true' emo album, as the album's aesthetic fit more into the contemporary definition of the genre. Furthermore, the album single-handedly turned the struggling Vagrant label into one of the top indie labels in the country, selling over 140,000 copies after its release. Not only did the album make the Get Up Kids the poster children for emo, but it also launched the genre into a public consciousness broader than the scattered local scenes that had previously embraced it. The album gave Vagrant Records the financial backing to grow and sign a string of other bands. At the same time, the addition of keyboards alienated some fans who thought it moved the band away from the contemporary punk scene's DIY ethic.

The Get Up Kids toured nonstop for almost three years in promotion of the record. As well as touring Europe, Japan, and Australia, they shared bills with acts such as Green Day, the Anniversary, Hot Rod Circuit, Jebediah, Weezer and Ozma. Their 2000 tour with the Anniversary and Koufax was sponsored by Napster. Their fanbase kept expanding through word of mouth. Venues booked months in advance could no longer hold the demand by the time the band arrived in town and fans were forced to stand outside to see them perform. The strength of the album's sales eventually led Interscope Records to purchase a minority stake in Vagrant, and cemented the label's credibility with other up-and-coming bands.

To capitalize on anticipation for the band's next album, Vagrant Records released a rarities compilation Eudora in 2001. Eudora consisted of alternate takes, covers, and B-sides since the band's formation. Likewise, Doghouse released a re-mastered edition of Four Minute Mile and a compilation entitled The EPs: Woodson and Red Letter Day, combining the two Doghouse-owned EPs on one compact disc.

=== On a Wire (2002–2003) ===
After three years of touring for Something to Write Home About, the band was beginning to feel burned-out and wished to depart from the upbeat power-pop sound with which they had become associated. They also began to broaden their musical horizons, taking much greater influence from classic rock artists like Led Zeppelin; "Our musical tastes were expanding, and our songwriting reflected that. We were discovering older bands that were new to us," said Pryor in 2021. According to Rob Pope, "It was a weird time. We were a bunch of 19, 20, 21-year-old kids...It was this weird formative era where we were challenged by a totally different thing than Thurston Moore and Ian Mackaye. "We were all going through our, like bullshit Beatles phase, and unfortunately we were doing that in public."

Speaking about the change in the band's dynamic and artistry around this time, Pryor believes "[Rob & Ryan Pope's] musicianship and the way [they] were, like, locking together took a much more mature jump from Something to Write Home About to On a Wire, Jim was starting to become more of a lead guitar player, we were thinking about it more. We were conceptualizing it more." The band spent a great deal more time than in the past demoing songs, eventually sending them to their manager Rich Egan, who was skeptical of the new sound. He told them "You guys can make an art record if you want to, but I'm just saying, this is a drastic turn from your previous material."

The band decided to look for a new producer to work with on their third album, wanting to make a more cohesive, "produced" record than their previous material. They put together a list of producers, including Stephen Street & John Leckie. The band formally approached Nigel Godrich and Gil Norton with offers, although both declined. They approached Jerry Finn, citing his work on the Superdrag album Head Trip in Every Key. Finally, the band settled on Scott Litt, best known for his work with R.E.M., the Replacements and Nirvana. "I remember we were like, 'we want to make the biggest record ever," recalls Rob Pope. "We had it in our heads at that point that we wanted to be on the radio. Scott Litt had a pretty good success rate with that."

Litt came to Lawrence, Kansas to do extensive pre-production on the record, before going to Bridgeport, Connecticut in early February for the recording sessions at Litt's suggestion. The album was recorded at Tarquin Studios, with studio owner and later Grammy Award-winning producer Peter Katis engineering. The band lived in the studio for the duration of the record, recording for four weeks. "It was freezing cold, and I don't think I left a one-block radius very often. It was kind of depressing," said Pope. Pryor had to leave after recording for the birth of his daughter, while Rob & Ryan Pope stayed behind to mix the album with Litt and Katis. The process became increasingly contentious, with Litt clashing with the band members. "There were some very questionable decisions in the mixing process. Engineering and tracking with Scott was hard for us, and then mixing with him was like, 'that's the reverb choice you're making on this snare? Which decade are we in?'"

The band's third studio album, On a Wire was released on May 14, 2002, debuting a more measured, alternative style. Just as Something to Write Home About alienated some fans with its more produced sound, On a Wire was criticized by fans who were disappointed with the album's softer musical direction. Specifically, the reviewer for Alternative Press wrote "Unfortunately, the visceral energy of their early days is lost in their newfound maturity."

"Walking on a Wire"
"Walking on a Wire", from On a Wire reflects the shift in tone and style from the band's previous works toward a more mature, alternative sound.

While many fans were upset with this sudden change of direction, the album was generally well received by mainstream publications. Entertainment Weekly was highly positive, writing that "This is the group at their best." In his review of the album, Rolling Stone writer Barry Walters wrote "On a Wire quivers with the anxieties that must have arisen as the Get Up Kids left behind what originally made them. Straining vocals, racing tempos and walls of distortion give way to softer singing, spacious guitars and prominent keyboards . . . The Get Up Kids dig deeper into themselves. What they find is often subtle, less visceral but far more tender."

The poor public reception of the album had a larger impact on the band's popularity as a whole. The band embarked on a tour to promote the album in the late spring soon after the album was released, only to find that they had far less support from both their fans and their record label. Using the financial and critical success of Something to Write Home About, Vagrant signed several other headlining emo bands such as Alkaline Trio, Dashboard Confessional, and Saves the Day. The Get Up Kids were no longer the label's top priority, and certainly not after the lukewarm reception of On a Wire. In an interview with Alternative Press, lead singer Matt Pryor considered the dramatic change in style on On a Wire seriously dented the momentum the band had built up since Something to Write Home About, allowing later bands such as Dashboard Confessional to take much of the fan base that the Get Up Kids had previously earned. In an interview, Pryor confessed that he did not think that "anyone, including Vagrant, gave that record a chance". Even though they had avoided the term since its inception, it was at this point the band actively began trying to shed the term "emo", a word that had defined them for years but had come to be associated with more pop-oriented acts. Pryor commented on the album, saying "We really didn't give two shits if anyone liked the record or not, we were really confident that we were going to kill this 'emo' stigma that we had and take the people with open minds with us and leave everyone else in the dust."

In 2021, speaking on their stubbornness, Pryor admitted "I think if anyone told us we were making a bad decision, we would have fired them."

=== Guilt Show (2003–2004) ===
In 2003 the band began recording their fourth studio album. The band used the label's advance money to purchase Black Lodge Studios in Eudora, Kansas, a studio they renovated and went on to own with longtime producer Ed Rose. The writing process for the album was different from their past efforts, as most of the songs were written by only three of the band members. In the early stages of writing, Jim Suptic was on his honeymoon. James Dewees was involved in a difficult divorce, and much of his creative efforts inspired by those events went into the fourth Reggie and the Full Effect album Songs Not to Get Married To. While this led to a less collaborative effort than in the past, it gave the Pope brothers a more substantial role in writing than ever before. In an interview with Alternative Press, Pryor confirmed the song "Never Be Alone" was written by Rob Pope about his 2003 divorce from Anniversary keyboardist Adrianne Verhoeven.

This fractured approach to the writing process began to strain relationships in the band, at one point leading Suptic to consider quitting the band. Pryor drew lyrical inspiration from the lives of friends and people he knew, extracting stories of abuse, betrayal and guilt. The album's lyrics also delve into incidents of adultery ("Wouldn't Believe It", "How Long Is Too Long") and the album's first single "The One You Want" was written about a woman who "Sucks the soul out of people".

In March 2004, the band released their fourth studio album Guilt Show, produced by Ed Rose. Sonically, the album combined the more measured, sophisticated sound of On a Wire with the frenetic style of their earlier work. Guilt Show—which was titled after a misreading of a flier saying "Quilt show"—was very well received both critically and commercially. The more pop-driven tone of the album reunited the band with many fans who were disenchanted after On a Wire, while also staying close enough to the evolution of the last album to interest newer fans and critics. However, their return was overshadowed by the booming popularity of other contemporary emo bands such as Dashboard Confessional, who invited the band to open for them on the 2004 Honda Civic Tour.

=== Breakup and solo activity (2004–2008) ===
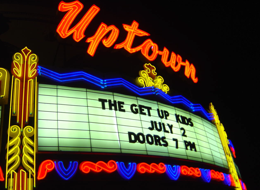
The Uptown Theater marquee on July 2, 2005, before the band's farewell concert.

Over the course of the tour with Dashboard Confessional, relationships between the band members continued to decline. The band's live shows had deteriorated, and Rob and Suptic had both threatened to quit multiple times. Finally, Matt Pryor had a breakdown in Australia from the stresses of being away from his newborn first child. "My daughter was 2 years old, and my oldest son was about 3 months away from being born, and I was in a really dark headspace about leaving," he reflected years later. "I needed a break just to be at home and ultimately... that's not what everyone else wanted. It was killing me."

After the Honda Civic tour ended, the band embarked on their world tour, including stops throughout Europe, Japan and Australia. However, their live performance hit an all-time low, with Pryor sometimes refusing even to sing large portions of songs. At one tour date in England, the tensions came to a head when Ryan Pope confronted Pryor over his recent despondence, leading to a band meeting where Pryor confessed his desire to reduce his commitment to the rest of the group. After some discussion, the band agreed that their hearts were no longer in it and at the end of the tour they would quietly end the band. Once the tour ended, the band went on an unofficial hiatus, not playing as a group until the next January, when they played a show at the Granada Theater in Lawrence, Kansas to celebrate the band's tenth anniversary. The show was recorded and released the following May as the band's first live album, Live! @ The Granada Theater.

On Tuesday, March 8, 2005, the Get Up Kids announced that after ten years, they were disbanding. They embarked on a national farewell tour, ending the band after a sold-out show on July 2, 2005, in their hometown of Kansas City at the Uptown Theater.

After the band's split, the Pope brothers took over management of Black Lodge Studios, the recording studio that the band formed with the recording of Guilt Show, alongside longtime producing partner Ed Rose. The brothers joined Koufax for a short stint, before splitting for different projects. Rob was a founding member of Lawrence, Kansas group White Whale, releasing the 2006 album WWI on Merge Records to moderate acclaim before becoming a full-time member of Spoon, while Ryan became the drummer for the Lawrence-based experimental rock band the Roman Numerals.

Matt Pryor continued as part of the New Amsterdams, an acoustic alt-country group he had formed in 2000, expanding its sound and solidifying its previously revolving-door lineup. In 2007 he formed the Terrible Twos, a children's band that has released two albums on Vagrant Records. Regarding the decision to make a children's album directly after the split, Pryor said "I wanted to do it anyway because I have kids and I want to write songs for them, but nobody is going to be like 'this isn't as good as the old stuff.' It's immune to punk criticism." In July 2008, he refocused his efforts on a solo career with the release of Confidence Man. After his second album, May Day, Pryor announced that he would be formally disbanding the New Amsterdams in favor of his solo career, concluding the band's tenure with the release of Outroduction, a B-sides compilation.

Jim Suptic went on to form Blackpool Lights with former members of Butterglory and the Creature Comforts. The band released their debut album This Town's Disaster in 2006, consisted largely of songs Suptic wrote for the Get Up Kids but never recorded. The album was released on Curb Appeal Records, an independent label Suptic founded with former Get Up Kids collaborator and local musician Alex Brahl. The label released albums by Smoking Popes and the New Amsterdams, but dissolved sometime in 2008. The exact reasons why were never revealed, but Suptic said only that it "blew up in [his] face." After the closure of the label, Suptic began working at Home Depot to support his family.

After the breakup of the Get Up Kids, James Dewees began performing with New Found Glory as their touring keyboardist, having previously played on their 2003 album Catalyst. As he traveled relentlessly, his ongoing struggles with alcohol and drug abuse worsened. After moving to New York City, he began to attend rehab, a process which would inspire the fifth Reggie and the Full Effect album, Last Stop: Crappy Town. After another brief tour opening for Hellogoodbye in 2006, he joined My Chemical Romance as their full-time touring keyboardist and later becoming a full time member.

=== Reunion and new music (2008–2011) ===
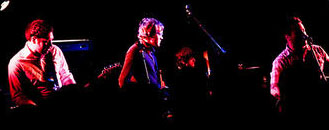
The Get Up Kids performing at their reunion show at The Record Bar in Kansas City

In late August and September 2008, while Dewees was touring with Reggie and the Full Effect, he began making hints that the Get Up Kids would be reuniting to commemorate the tenth anniversary of the band's second album Something to Write Home About. The reunion was finally confirmed by a post on the official music blog of The Kansas City Star, confirming rumors that the band would be playing a surprise reunion show at The Record Bar in Kansas City on November 16, 2008. According to the article, the band had made the decision over the summer and had Dewees intentionally leak the information to gauge fan interest.

The reunion show was officially announced on Friday, November 14, along with the official confirmation of the album re-release and a 2009 national tour. The tenth anniversary edition of the album includes a code to download bonus demo tracks from the original recording of Something To Write Home About from the Vagrant Records website, and a DVD containing a band retrospective and other content, including archive footage, and their live performance from March 13, 2009, at Liberty Hall in Lawrence. The show took place Sunday, November 16, 2008, at the record bar in Kansas City. The band played their album Something To Write Home About from beginning to end, as well as a six-song encore.

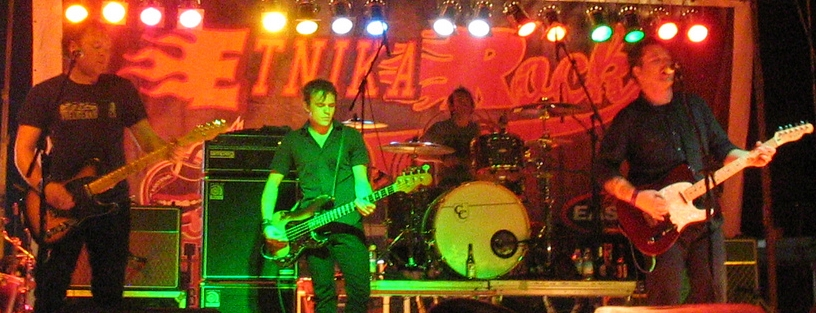
The band while on tour in Italy in 2009

In the summer of 2009, they returned to Black Lodge studios to record their first new material in five years, recording twelve tracks intended to be released as three EPs over the course of a year. The band's reunion tour took place in Europe, followed by the US between mid-August and early October with Youth Group. After this, they went on another US tour, which ran into November 2009, with Mansions. On April 13, 2010, the band released the first EP Simple Science on Flyover Records. Despite their reformation, obligations to other projects limited the amount of time the band could spend together. On their 2010 tour, fun. bassist Nate Harold filled in for Rob Pope, who was already committed to touring with Spoon. In 2011 while James Dewees was on a world tour with My Chemical Romance, New Amsterdams regular Dustin Kinsey filled in on keyboards.

After the release of Simple Science, the band decided to combine the remaining tracks—along with three more newly recorded songs—into a new full-length album, There Are Rules. They also confirmed that the album would not be released on Vagrant Records, who had released their previous three albums, but on their own Quality Hill Records. The album was produced by Ed Rose and mixed by Bob Weston, who produced the band's debut album. There Are Rules was released on January 25, 2011, and was supported by a co-headlining tour with Saves the Day.

=== Second hiatus, Problems (since 2012) ===
After There Are Rules largely failed to find an audience, the members of the Get Up Kids took another short hiatus working non-music industry jobs, interrupted only by brief weekend tours and one-off shows. While drinking at a bar before their performance at the 2017 When We Were Young festival, the band began to talk about recommitting to the Get Up Kids as a full-time pursuit. That same year, the band went on tour in Latin America for the first time and played six concerts in Mexico, Chile, Argentina and Brazil.

On March 29, 2018, Polyvinyl Records and Big Scary Monsters announced on their Instagram account that they had signed the band and that new music will be coming soon. The band released a thirteen-minute, four song EP entitled Kicker on June 8, 2018. This was followed by Problems on May 10, 2019, the group's first album in eight years. A review of Problems published by Exclaim! said "It sounds just as great as some of their older albums, reminding us why this band are still one of the greatest emo/alternative acts to come out of the '90s."

In 2024 and 2025 The Get Up Kids toured North America, Europe and the UK to celebrate the 25th anniversary of Something To Write Home About.

== Musical style and influences ==
The Get Up Kids' music has been described as emo, Midwest emo, punk rock, and pop-punk. The band has varingly classified their music as indie rock and punk rock. The Get Up Kids have cited numerous bands as influences, including Superchunk, Jawbreaker, Fugazi, Rocket from the Crypt, Sunny Day Real Estate, Cap'n Jazz, Vitreous Humor, and Jimmy Eat World.

== Legacy ==
There should be a How To Be a Pop-Punk Kid starter kit with bands like Get Up Kids, so kids would know whose shoulders bands like us are standing on. Fall Out Boy would not be a band if it were not for The Get Up Kids.

— Fall Out Boy bassist Pete Wentz, Alternative Press

The Get Up Kids have had a lasting impact on the music scene, having been cited as inspirations to several prominent bands and artists, and one of the bands who shaped the sound of the emo genre ahead of its later mainstreaming with the "third wave" movement in the early 2000s. In a 2017 retrospective on Four Minute Mile, Vice Media said that "Along with bands like Lifetime and Hot Water Music, The Get Up Kids developed a sound that was certainly responsible for the future of emo. These were the bands that picked up where Jawbreaker left off, and each in their own way contributed to shaping the future chart-topping genre."

The Get Up Kids' greatest influence came at the beginning of the 2000s with the rise of bands like My Chemical Romance and Fall Out Boy, both of whom cite the Get Up Kids as a major influence, particularly their album Four Minute Mile. In a 2005 interview with Alternative Press, Fall Out Boy bassist Pete Wentz stated that the band had a significant impact on him and the rest of the band, saying "There should be a How To Be a Pop-Punk Kid starter kit with bands like Get Up Kids, so kids would know whose shoulders bands like us are standing on. Fall Out Boy would not be a band if it were not for The Get Up Kids."

Blink-182 bassist and singer Mark Hoppus is a vocal fan, having proposed to his wife to the Get Up Kids song "I'll Catch You." They were also a major influence on the rest of the band, even at their peak popularity around the release of Take Off Your Pants and Jacket.

New Jersey–based act Midtown has stated in interviews that they were heavily influenced by the Get Up Kids, among other groups. Early November band members were all fans of, and influenced by, the Get Up Kids. The Early November song "Baby Blue" includes the line "I don't want you to love me anymore", a direct reference to the Get Up Kids song "No Love" both lyrically and melodically. The band Hellogoodbye have been vocal fans of the band and while on tour with Reggie and the Full Effect in 2007, two years after the breakup of the Get Up Kids, Hellogoodbye invited James Dewees and Matt Pryor onstage with them, and proceeded to back them in a cover of the Get Up Kids' song "Action & Action". The Canadian post-hardcore band Silverstein has cited the Get Up Kids as a major influence, and covered their song Coming Clean for a split 7-inch with August Burns Red in 2013.

Claudio Sanchez of Coheed and Cambria cited Something to Write Home About as one of the albums that the band listened to and during the recording of their breakout album In Keeping Secrets of Silent Earth: 3.

Dan Campbell of the Wonder Years has cited the band as one of the artists who made him want to become a musician, going so far as to name his company after the Get Up Kids' track "Forgive & Forget" from Eudora. In a 2010 interview with Alternative Press, Campbell said "I don't think I listen to any band more than I listen to [the Get Up Kids]. They really influence my songwriting, too. Every time I hear a Get Up Kids song, I think 'Oh, that's really creative' or, 'That's really cool that they did that.'"

New Found Glory's frontman Jordan Pundik states that the namesake of their band was partly influenced by the song A Newfound Interest in Massachusetts.

Despite their lasting influence on modern music, the band has attempted to disassociate themselves from many of the bands they inspired. Following the band's reformation, guitarist Jim Suptic undertook an interview with the website Drowned in Sound, in which he said, "The punk scene we came out of and the punk scene now are completely different. It's like glam rock now. We played the Bamboozle fests this year and we felt really out of place... If this is the world we helped create, then I apologize." He went on to say they were grateful for the acknowledgments they have received, though explaining "the problem is most of [the bands they inspired] aren't very good."

In a 2020 interview with Apple Music on the history of Emo music, Matt Pryor expanded on his recent view of the current scene more positively; "I will always owe a debt to Evan Weiss from Into It. Over It. for showing me that there was a new crop of bands like his band and Modern Baseball and Pup that were, like— They had the same work ethic we had when we were young."

In the years since reuniting, the band has actively supported newer emo bands, taking acts like Tigers Jaw, PUP, Steel Train and The Hotelier on tour.

The staff of Consequence ranked the band at number 17 on their list of "The 100 Best Pop Punk Bands" in 2019.

== Band members ==
Current members

- Matt Pryor – lead vocals, rhythm guitar (1995–2005, 2008–present)
- Jim Suptic – lead guitar, backing and occasional lead vocals (1995–2005, 2008–present)
- Rob Pope – bass (1995–2005, 2008–present)
- Ryan Pope – drums, percussion (1996–2005, 2008–present)
- Dustin Kinsey – keyboards (2019–present; 2011 touring)

Former members

- Thomas Becker – drums, percussion (1995)
- Nathan Shay – drums, percussion, backing vocals (1996)
- James Dewees – keyboards, backing vocals (1999–2005, 2008–2019)

Former touring musicians

- Nate Harold – bass (2010; substitute for Rob Pope)

Timeline

== Discography ==
Studio albums

- Four Minute Mile (1997)
- Something to Write Home About (1999)
- On a Wire (2002)
- Guilt Show (2004)
- There Are Rules (2011)
- Problems (2019)
