= Ryan Pope =

American musician

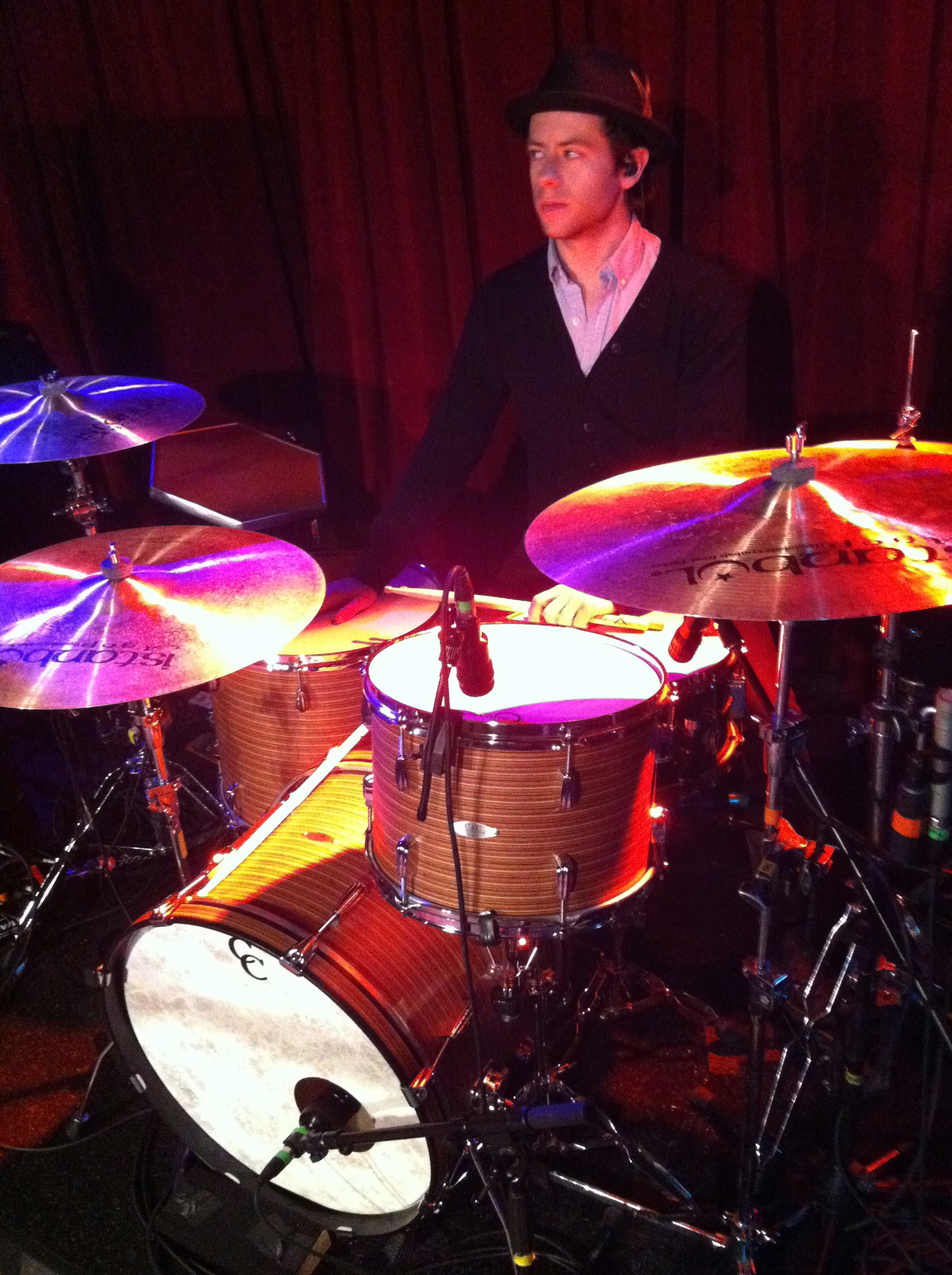

Background information
- Born: Ryan Pope; July 9, 1978 (age 48)
- Origin: Olathe, Kansas, U.S.
- Genres: Alternative rock; indie rock; emo; power pop; pop punk
- Occupation: Musician
- Instrument: Drums
- Years active: 1994–present
- Labels: Vagrant, Doghouse
- Member of: The Get Up Kids
- Formerly of: Koufax, The New Amsterdams, Reggie and the Full Effect
- Website: thegetupkids.com; koufaxmusic.com

Ryan Pope is an American musician who lives in Lawrence, Kansas.

== History ==
Ryan Pope grew up in Olathe, Kansas. In the summer of 1994, he was in a band called "Kingpin" with his brother Rob and future The Get Up Kids bandmate Jim Suptic. After the band broke up due to internal conflicts, Rob and Jim re-formed with Matt Pryor, who had been playing with Secular Theme and friend Nathan Shay on drums to form The Get Up Kids. After Shay quit the band due to a reluctance to tour, the band asked Ryan to become their new drummer. In 1997 the band recorded its first release, Four Minute Mile. Ryan also played drums with Safety in Numbers. He has also toured with Reggie and the Full Effect and The New Amsterdams.

After The Get Up Kids broke up in the summer of 2005, Ryan and his brother Rob joined the band Koufax. They recorded the album Hard Times are in Fashion. Pope also is a member of The Cavaliers and did a short stint drumming for the Lawrence Kansas techno-indie fusion group Roman Numerals. In 2008, The Get Up Kids re-formed and recorded material for release in 2010.

He was married on July 2, 2011.

== Discography ==
=== with The Get Up Kids ===
- Four Minute Mile (1997)
- Something to Write Home About (1999)
- On a Wire (2002)
- Guilt Show (2004)
- There Are Rules (2011)
- Problems (2019)

=== With Koufax ===
- Hard Times Are in Fashion (2005)
- Why Bother At All (2005)

=== with Reggie and the Full Effect ===
- Songs Not to Get Married To (2005)

=== With Safety in Numbers ===
- In The Key of D
