= Rob Pope =

American musician

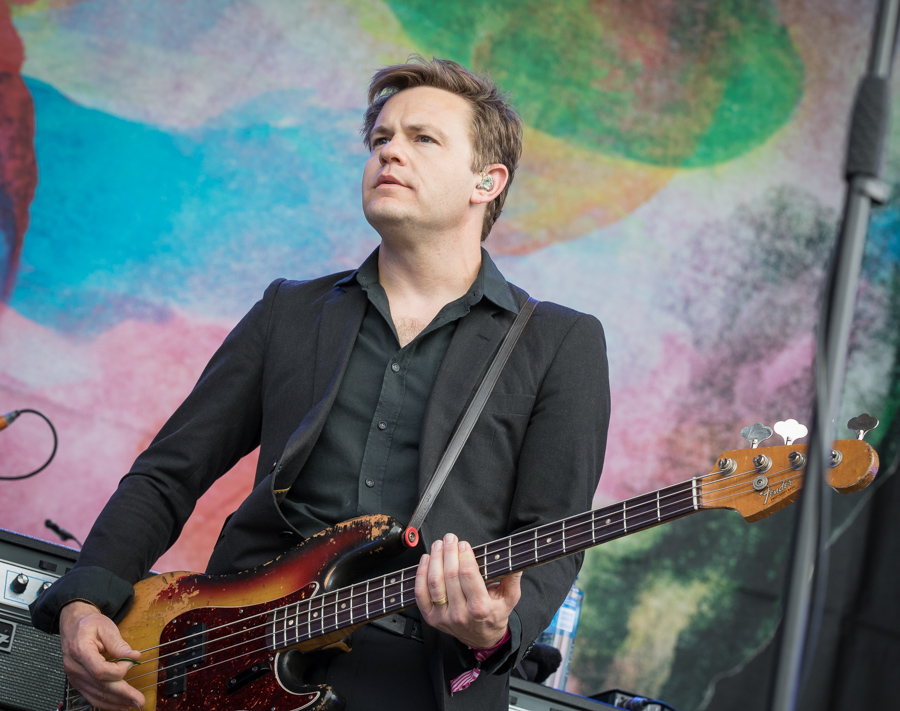
- Rob Pope performing in 2017

Background information
- Born: Robert Pope
- Origin: Olathe, Kansas, U.S
- Genres: Alternative rock; emo; indie rock; experimental rock; pop; power pop; pop punk
- Occupation: Musician
- Instrument: Bass
- Years active: 1995–present
- Labels: Vagrant; Merge; Doghouse
- Member of: The Get Up Kids
- Formerly of: White Whale; Spoon; Koufax; Reggie and the Full Effect; The New Amsterdams

Robert Pope is an American musician, best known as the bassist for Spoon and The Get Up Kids.

== History ==
Rob Pope grew up in Olathe, Kansas. In the summer of 1994, he was in a band called "Kingpin" with his brother Ryan and future Get Up Kids bandmate Jim Suptic. After the band broke up due to internal conflicts, Rob and Jim re-formed with Matt Pryor, who had been playing with Secular Theme and friend Nathan Shay on drums. After Shay was replaced with Rob's brother Ryan, the band recorded its first release, Four Minute Mile.

After The Get Up Kids called it quits, Rob joined the band Koufax, along with his brother Ryan to form their new rhythm section. Together they recorded the album Hard Times are in Fashion in 2005. In the same year he joined the band White Whale to record their album WW1. Soon afterward he joined the band Spoon and recorded their album Ga Ga Ga Ga Ga. He currently lives in Lawrence, Kansas.

On July 9, 2019, it was announced that Pope was leaving Spoon.

== Discography ==
=== with The Get Up Kids ===
- Four Minute Mile (1997)
- Something to Write Home About (1999)
- On a Wire (2002)
- Guilt Show (2004)
- There Are Rules (2011)
- Kicker (2018)
- Problems (2019)

=== with The New Amsterdams ===
- Never You Mind (2000)

=== with Reggie and the Full Effect ===
- Songs Not to Get Married To (2005)

=== with Koufax ===
- Hard Times are in Fashion (2005)
- Why Bother at All (2005)

=== with White Whale ===
- WW1 (2006, Merge Records)

=== with Spoon ===
- Ga Ga Ga Ga Ga (2007, Merge Records)
- Transference (2010, Merge Records)
- They Want My Soul (2014, Republic Records)
- Hot Thoughts (2017, Matador Records)
- Everything Hits at Once: The Best of Spoon (2019, Matador Records)
