= Jim Suptic =

American musician and entrepreneur (born 1977)

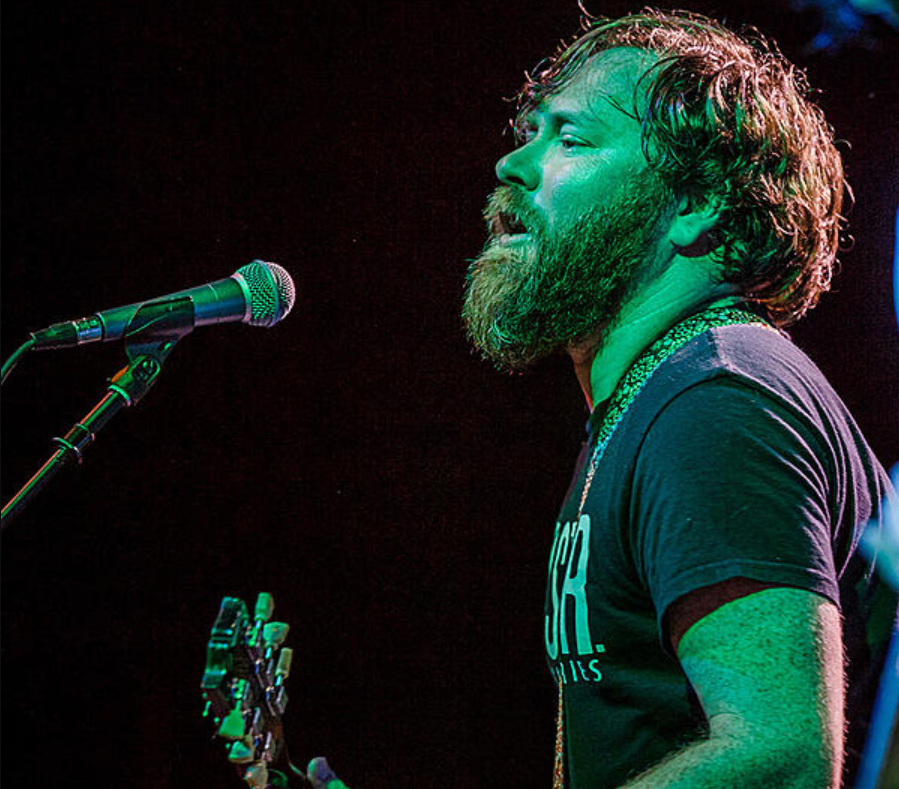
- Jim Suptic performing with The Get Up Kids at the Riviera Theater in Chicago IL, December 2017.

Background information
- Also known as: Wicked Supti
- Born: James David Suptic; October 14, 1977 (age 48)
- Origin: Olathe, Kansas, U.S.
- Genres: Alternative rock; indie rock; emo; pop punk
- Occupations: Musician, entrepreneur
- Instruments: Vocals, guitar
- Years active: 1994–present
- Labels: Vagrant, Curb Appeal
- Website: thegetupkids.com; blackpoollights.com; curbappealrecords.com

Jim Suptic (born October 14, 1977) is an American musician and entrepreneur, best known for being the guitarist for the rock band The Get Up Kids.

== Career ==
=== The Get Up Kids ===
Jim Suptic is best known for being the guitarist and sometime lead singer for the Kansas City band The Get Up Kids. He grew up in Olathe, Kansas. In the summer of 1994, he was in a band called "Kingpin" with future Get Up Kids bandmates, brothers Rob and Ryan Pope. After the band broke up due to internal conflicts, Rob and Jim re-formed with Matt Pryor (who had been playing with Secular Theme) and friend Nathan Shay. The band officially formed on October 14, 1995 (Suptic's 18th birthday). Shay, unwilling to tour, was replaced with Rob's brother Ryan. The band recorded its first release, Four Minute Mile in 1996.

After touring throughout the midwest with Braid, The Promise Ring and Jimmy Eat World, the band signed to the then-unknown Vagrant Records to record their second album Something to Write Home About. The album was a hit, making Vagrant Records one of the largest independent record labels in the country.

After the release of Something to Write Home About, the band toured for three years until the 2002 release of their follow-up album On a Wire. The band hired on Scott Litt to produce the album, deciding to take a drastic turn toward alternative, departing from their high-energy powerpop/emo roots. After its release, the album flopped and Vagrant retracted much of the promotional push behind it.

In 2004, the band released their fourth studio album Guilt Show. The album was far better received than On a Wire, and the band embarked on an extensive world tour to promote the album. However, tensions began running high between the band members. Keyboardist James Dewees had recently gone through a bitter divorce (inspiration for the Reggie and the Full Effect album Songs Not to Get Married To) and lead singer Matt Pryor's wife had recently given birth to their first child, so he was upset at not getting to spend time with her.

In 2005, the band announced that they would embark on one final U.S. tour before breaking up. The band's final show on that tour took place on July 2, 2005 at the Uptown Theater in Kansas City, Missouri. The band continued to tour in 2010, playing the festivals in Reading and Leeds, UK.

=== Blackpool Lights ===
In 2004, after the band had finished recording their fourth album Guilt Show, Suptic formed Blackpool Lights, a side-project with former Creature Comforts drummer Billy Brimblecom and former Butterglory bassist Brian Everard. After The Get Up Kids broke up in the summer of 2005, Blackpool Lights drew his full focus. They released a five-track Self-titled EP in 2005. On July 22, 2006 the band released its first album This Town's Disaster. After its release, the band went on to tour in support of the album with Supersuckers and Social Distortion.

The band also gained some national attention. The band was named Spin Magazine's Artist of the Day. They were also chosen by the Major League Soccer to write and perform the official theme song for the Kansas City Wizards, entitled "Ain't Nobody Gonna Stop Us Now". After touring until 2007, the band has disbanded, along with Curb Appeal Records.

== Curb Appeal Records ==
Suptic is also an entrepreneur. He is one of the co-founders of Black Lodge Studios in Eudora, Kansas. The studio was formed as a joint venture between the members of The Get Up Kids and longtime friend and producer Ed Rose.

After the formation of Blackpool Lights, Suptic co-founded Kansas City-based indie label Curb Appeal Records. This Town's Disaster was the first album to be released on the label, and since then they have gone on to sign several other bands and artists, including The New Amsterdams, fronted by Get Up Kids bandmate Matt Pryor.

== Discography ==
=== with The Get Up Kids ===
- Four Minute Mile (1997)
- Something to Write Home About (1999)
- On a Wire (2002)
- Guilt Show (2004)
- There Are Rules (2011)
- Problems (2019)

=== With Blackpool Lights ===
- Self-Titled EP (2005)
- This Town's Disaster (2006)
- Okie Baroque (2010)

== Personal life ==
Jim lives in the Kansas City area with his two children.
