= Coalesce discography =

- Studio albums: 4
- Extended plays: 6
- Compilation albums: 3
- Video albums: 1
- Split albums: 5

The following is a list of releases created by American metalcore band Coalesce.

== Studio albums ==
Year	Album details
1997	Give Them Rope^{[A]}: Released: June 1, 1997; Format: LP, CD, CS; Label: Edison Records
1998	Functioning on Impatience: Released: 1998; Format: LP, CD; Label: Second Nature Recordings
1999	0:12 Revolution in Just Listening: Released: November 16, 1999; Format: LP, CD; Label: Relapse Records
2009	Ox^{[B]}: Released: June 9, 2009; Format: LP, CD, DL; Label: Relapse Records

A Give Them Rope was reissued as Give Them Rope, She Said in 2004 with new artwork.
B Ox peaked at number 28 on the US Top Heatseekers chart.

== Extended plays ==
Year	Album details
1994	Coalesce: Released: 1994; Format: 7"; Label: Chapter Records
1995	002: Released: August 8, 1995; Format: 7", CD; Label: Earache Records
1997	A Safe Place: Released: 1997; Format: 7"; Label: Edison Records/Second Nature Recordings
1999	There Is Nothing New Under the Sun: Released: March 30, 1999; Format: 12", CD; Label: Hydra Head Records
2007	Salt and Passage^{[C]}: Released: August 21, 2007; Format: 7"; Label: Second Nature Recordings
2009	OXEP: Released: November 2009; Format: 12", CD; Label: Relapse Records

C A 7" vinyl that includes two new songs in a hand screened gatefold. Will also be released on iTunes in October.

== Split albums ==
Year	Album details
1997	In Tongues We Speak: Released: 1997; Label: Earache Records; Split with: Napalm Death
1997	In These Black Days Vol. 3: Released: 1997; Label: Hydra Head Records; Split with: Today Is the Day
1997	The Get Up Kids / Coalesce: Released: 1997; Label: Second Nature Recordings; Split with: The Get Up Kids
1997	Among the Dead We Pray for Light: Released: 1997; Label: Edison Records; Split with: Converge
2000	Coalesce / boysetsfire: Released: January 20, 2000; Label: Hydra Head Records; Split with: boysetsfire
2025	Live at CBGBs: Released: June 13, 2025; Split with: Converge

== Compilation albums ==
Year	Album details
1996	Coalesce Compilation: Released: August 27, 1996; Label: Second Nature Recordings
2000	002: A Safe Place Compilation: Released: July 24, 2000; Label: Second Nature Recordings
2000	Last Call for the Living^{[D]}: Released: 2000; Label: Second Nature Recordings
2003	Punk Goes Acoustic: Released: 2003; Label: Fearless Records
2005	PROTECT: A Benefit for the National Association to Protect Children: Released: 2005; Label: Fat Wreck Chords

D An untraditionally shaped vinyl-only release of early demos.

== Video albums ==
Year	Album details
2007	No Business in This Business^{[E]}: Released: October 23, 2007; Label: Second Nature Recordings

E Contains 15 full shows on four discs. It is only available through Coalesces' website and live shows.
