= Sean Ingram =

American musician and entrepreneur (born 1975)

- Also known as: Hungary Bear, Sean-O-Tronic
- Born: Sean Ingram; September 11, 1975 (age 50); Kansas City, Missouri, United States
- Genres: Mathcore; metalcore; hardcore punk
- Occupations: Musician; entrepreneur
- Instrument: Vocals
- Labels: Edison; Earache; Relapse; Second Nature

Sean Ingram (born September 11, 1975) is an American musician and entrepreneur, best known as the frontman for the mathcore band Coalesce. He contributed all the lyrics and most of the artwork and packaging for his band. After several years as a vocalist, he started an entrepreneurial career inspired by the DIY punk ethic, founding the companies Blue Collar Press, Merchtable and Fixcraft.

== Early life ==
Sean Ingram was born on September 11, 1975 in Kansas City, Missouri. He grew up in a middle-class family with an older sister and another younger sister. Ingram and his family moved to northern Oklahoma and later back to Kansas City. He describes his father as a racist man who "would carry around ... a constant anger" with him and recalls occasions where he verbally abused him and beat him. In his early teens, Ingram used to skate along with his friend Dan Askew and shortly afterward spent most of his free time skating vert. Both discovered punk rock and hardcore through skateboard videos. Since seventh grade, Ingram was progressively affected because his father started distancing himself from his family and he began to "escape" through "loud music in headphones, skateboarding, or getting drunk", spending much time outside of his house. Ingram got into straight edge through friends who practiced freestyle BMX, including Rick Thorne and Dennis McCoy, and after bad experiences with alcohol and drugs he claimed edge.

Ingram states that he "always have liked creating things" and, inspired by the DIY punk ethic, he founded the skateboard zine Our World as a teenager, and afterward the skateboard company Reaction Skateboards at the age of sixteen. He describes himself as "a merch freak" and collected figures and toys as a teenager. He started school a year earlier and graduated at the age of seventeen.

== Music career ==
As a teenager, Ingram became largely involved in the hardcore straight edge scene of Kansas City and for this reason, in 1993, he was invited to join the band xRestrainx as a vocalist.

Ingram, who became a big fan of Earth Crisis' 1992 EP All Out War, began exchanging letters with members of the Syracuse, New York vegan straight edge scene and, a few months after finishing school, he relocated to that city on Christmas Day, 1993. He lived there for four months in the same house as Earth Crisis' original guitarist Ben Read. Around Easter 1994, he came back to Kansas City for a weekend visit and Jes Steineger and Stacy Hilt, whom he knew from before, gave him a tape of an instrumental song to audition for their new band, Breach, as singer. Even though Ingram had a good relationship with some people from the Syracuse scene, he ended up disillusioned with their militant attitude and, shortly thereafter, returned to Kansas with the vocals and lyrics of "Harvest of Maturity", being accepted to join Breach, which subsequently changed its name to Coalesce.

In 1995, Coalesce released their debut EP 002 through Solid State Records, which became a pioneering and influential work in the mathcore genre. Through an unstable career with numerous disbandments, the band went on to release three studio albums until 1999. In order to support his music career, Ingram worked as a wallpaper hanger by trade during the first years of the band. In 2009, Coalesce released their fourth album, Ox. Ingram has contributed to the artwork and packaging of all the band' studio albums.

Ingram has been featured in most albums by Reggie and the Full Effect, the solo project of former Coalesce drummer James Dewees, with the pseudonyms Hungary Bear and Sean-O-Tronic.

On July 8, 2001, Ingram joined The Dillinger Escape Plan as vocalist during their performance at the Krazy Fest 4 in Louisville, Kentucky, while they were auditioning for a new singer. He was scheduled for a second show at the CMJ Music Festival in New York City on September 12, but it was cancelled after the September 11 attacks. Later, the event was rescheduled in October but the band had already hired Greg Puciato.

== Entrepreneurial career ==
=== Blue Collar Press ===
In the mid-1990s, Ingram was hired by Home Depot as their wallpaper expert but stopped going after three days because it did not satisfy his "need to create and make something".

In 1999, Ingram founded the screenprint company Blue Collar Press, originally selling merchandise to the local bands The Get Up Kids, Appleseed Cast and The Anniversary. He made this decision following the frustration of most bands he knew, including Coalesce, at the lack and low quality of merchandising. At the time, Ingram was teaching himself graphic design, while simultaneously working as a singer and independent wallpaper hanger, and after seeing a screen press on eBay, he borrowed $200, his father drove him out to Denver and bought it. Friends let him plant it on the basement of the Black Lodge Recording studio and he learned to use it. At the beginning, Ingram handled all production but now acts mainly as the manager.

=== Merchtable ===
In 2002, Blue Collar Press expanded its services and offices with its new division Blue Collar Distro, which manages the artists' merchandise through their own websites and sells distribution models. In 2005, the company was selling merchandise to bands such as Linkin Park and Dashboard Confessional. In 2013, Blue Collar Distro was renamed Merchtable. Nowadays, it works with Porter Robinson, Neurosis, Hydra Head Records, Marc Maron, DJ Snake, Rufus Wainwright, Yung Gravy, among others artists.

As of 2018, both Blue Collar Press and Merchtable have twenty-five workers in aggregate.

=== Fixcraft ===
In 2010, Ingram founded the Hardcourt Bike Polo equipment and bicycles manufacturer company Fixcraft. A few years before, he saw a Hardcourt Bike Polo match near his home and became an avid fan and practitioner of the sport because of its similarities with the 1990s American punk scene. Among Fixcraft innovations were the first official Bike Polo ball, its first championships and league, and camps. In December 2017, Fixcraft was closed due to exhaustion and financial reasons.

== Vocals, lyrics and legacy ==
Originally, Ingram's vocal style consisted in high-pitched throat screaming. His first influences included Youth of Today's Ray Cappo, Mouthpiece and All Out War-era Karl Buechner of Earth Crisis. During their first tours, Ingram learned to use his diaphragm to produce a lower and more powerful vocal delivery, which he started recording since 1997 Coalesce split album In Tongues We Speak. In 2000, he cited Phil Anselmo of Pantera and Karl Buechner (who over time developed guttural vocals) as his biggest musical inspirations. Ingram has to practice around three days before touring and around three weeks before recording to perform well.

Ingram has written all the lyrics and song titles for Coalesce songs. Most of them deal with complicated family and intimate relationships, his experiences with death, news stories and cynicism towards some hardcore punk ideologies. His lyrics delve into symbolism and sometimes have been described as "obscure". In 2000, Ingram cited Lisa Loeb and Maynard Keenan of Tool as his biggest lyrical influences. He stated that it "bothers" him that critics usually describe his performances as "so pissed off and so brutal", because their energy actually comes "more of desperation. Like “listen to me, I know this is true!” type of place, not a “you are wrong, and this is why I hate you!” place."

Among the artists who cite Sean Ingram as an influence or have been quoted expressing admiration for his music are Robin Staps of The Ocean, Rob Fusco of Most Precious Blood, and Alison Bellevance of Fall River.

== Personal life ==
Sean Ingram has been married to Chela Ingram since 1995 and the couple had two daughters and then two sons. He was brought up as a Catholic and now identifies as a Christian.

== Discography ==
Coalesce

- 1997: Give Them Rope
- 1998: Functioning on Impatience
- 1999: 0:12 Revolution in Just Listening
- 2009: Ox

=== Guest appearances ===
Year	Song(s)	Artist	Album	Source
2000	"A Dead Dear"	The Casket Lottery	Moving Mountains	
2000	"Something I'm Not"	Reggie and the Full Effect	Promotional Copy	
2003	"Apocalypse WOW!" "F.O.O.D. aka Aren't You Hungary"	Reggie and the Full Effect	Under the Tray	
2003	"In the Meantime"	The Casket Lottery	Possiblies and Maybes	
2003	"001", "003"	Miasis	In and Out of Weeks	
2004	"The Fellowship of the Bling"	Reggie and the Full Effect	Greatest Hits 1984–1987 (reissue)	
2004	"Sound Effects and Overdramatics"	The Used	In Love and Death	
2005	"Dethnotronic"	Reggie and the Full Effect	Songs Not to Get Married To	
2005	"Queen of the Food Chain"	The Ocean	Aeolian	
2008	"The Fall of Las Vegas"	The Out Circuit	Pierce the Empire With A Sound	
2013	"Dmv Featuring Common Denominator"	Reggie and the Full Effect	No Country for Old Musicians	
2014	"Pelican of the Desert"	Every Time I Die	From Parts Unknown	
2016	"Forever Hurtling Towards Andromeda"	Norma Jean	Polar Similar	
2018	"The Dead We Do Not Mourn"	Tetelestai	Crvsh Svtvn	
