= Low Level Owl =

Low Level Owl can refer to either of two albums by The Appleseed Cast:

- Low Level Owl, Vol. 1, released on August 21, 2001.
- Low Level Owl, Vol. 2, released on October 23, 2001.
