= Sagarmatha (album) =

Studio album by The Appleseed Cast
- Released: February 17, 2009
- Genre: Indie rock, post-rock
- Length: 49:43; 53:09 (Vinyl)
- Label: Vagrant Records and The Militia Group

The Appleseed Cast chronology
Peregrine (2006)	Sagarmatha (2009)	Illumination Ritual (2013)

Professional ratings
Review scores
Source	Rating
Allmusic	3.5/5 stars
ReviewRinseRepeat	4/5 stars
Sputnikmusic	4.0/5 stars
Strangeglue	8/10 stars

Sagarmatha is the seventh full-length album by Lawrence, Kansas-based indie rock group the Appleseed Cast, released on February 17, 2009 by The Militia Group and Vagrant Records. The album was also released on double LP by Graveface Records; the vinyl version has an alternate track listing and one additional track. The album's title is derived from the Tibetan word for Mount Everest, which guitarist Aaron Pillar learned while reading Jon Krakauer's 1997 book Into Thin Air.

== Writing and recording ==
The album began life as an instrumental EP, which was then stretched out as the band returned to techniques they had previously utilized when writing Low Level Owl: Volume I and Low Level Owl: Volume II. According to Pillar, Sagarmatha was conceived as a concept album that revolved around "zombies and an apocalyptic future." Half the album was recorded at the band's home studio the Toy Shop, and the entire process lasted approximately nine months.

== Track listing ==
CD

1. "As the Little Things Go" - 8:15
2. "A Bright Light" - 7:05
3. "The Road West" - 8:08
4. "The Summer Before" - 3:09
5. "One Reminder, An Empty Room" - 1:49
6. "Raise the Sails" - 6:27
7. "Like a Locust (Shake Hands With the Dead)" - 4:02
8. "South Col" - 6:27
9. "An Army of Fireflies" - 4:28

Vinyl

- A1 "As the Little Things Go" - 8:15
- A2 "A Bright Light" - 7:05
- B1 "The Road West" - 8:08
- B2 "The Summer Before" - 3:09
- B3 "One Reminder, An Empty Room" - 1:49
- C1 "Raise the Sails" - 6:27
- C2 "South Col" - 6:27
- D1 "Like a Locust (Shake Hands With the Dead)" - 4:02
- D2 "An Army of Fireflies" - 4:28
- D3 "The New Stage" - 3:27

== Personnel ==
Performed by:

- Chris Crisci – vocals, guitar, recording engineer
- Aaron Pillar – lead guitar, backing vocals, recording engineer
- Marc Young – bass
- Aaron Coker – guitar
- John Anderson – drums, percussion
- Dustin Kinsey – guitar, backing vocals
- Ed Rose – keyboards, percussion, backing vocals, recording engineer
