= Live for Today =

Live for Today may refer to:

- Live for Today (EP), a 2002 EP by Boysetsfire
- "Live for Today" (song), a 1981 song by Toto
- "Live for Today", a song by 3 Doors Down from Seventeen Days
- "Live for Today", a song by Ratt from Ratt
- "Live for Today", a song by Sweet from Off the Record
- "Live for Today", a song by Zion I from Break a Dawn

== See also ==
- Let's Live for Today (disambiguation)
- Carpe diem
- Hedonism
- YOLO (aphorism)
