= A Reason to Breathe =

EP by The Esoteric
- Released: 21 March 2002
- Recorded: Red House Studios
- Genre: Metalcore; hardcore punk; mathcore; experimental metal
- Length: 18:00
- Label: Crash and Bang
- Producer: Ed Rose

The Esoteric chronology
Roads Between (2002)	A Reason to Breathe (2002)	Wormwood Split (2003)

A Reason to Breathe is an EP by the metalcore band The Esoteric. It was self-released on 21 March 2002.

== Track listing ==
Adapted from album sleeve and Discogs.

1. "Our Best Elvis Yet"
2. "Strategy of Luck"
3. "Worth the Wait"
4. "Eye Child"
5. "Flight of the Botfly"
