= OXEP =

EP by Coalesce
- Released: November 10, 2009
- Genre: Metalcore; Mathcore
- Length: 16:19
- Label: Relapse

Coalesce chronology
Ox (2009)	OXEP (2009)

Professional ratings
Review scores
Source	Rating
Decoy Music	4.5/5 stars

OXEP is an extended play by the American metalcore band Coalesce. The EP was released on November 10, 2009 through Relapse Records. The album was planned and written prior to the release of OXEP's companion album, Ox.

== Track listing ==
No.	Title	Length
1.	"Oxe to Ore"	1:22
2.	"The Blind Eye"	2:38
3.	"Joyless in Life"	2:06
4.	"To My Ruin"	4:30
5.	"Absent in Death"	2:36
6.	"Through Sparrows I Rest"	2:23
7.	"Ore to Earth"	0:44

== Personnel ==
- Sean Ingram – vocals
- Jes Steineger – guitar
- Nathan Ellis – bass
- Nathan "Jr." Richardson – drums
