= Lost Songs =

Lost Songs may refer to:

- Lost Songs (Anberlin album)
- Lost Songs (...And You Will Know Us By the Trail of Dead album)
- Lost Songs (New Model Army album)
- Lost Songs (The Appleseed Cast album)
- Lost Songs 95–98, an album by David Gray
- Lost Songs of 1936, an album by Bucky Pizzarelli, Dick Hyman, and Jay Leonhart
- The Lost Songs, a song collection by McFly
- Lostwave, a genre of songs with little to no information available about their origins, often dubbed "lost"

== See also ==
- Lost Song (disambiguation)
