= Coalesce / Boysetsfire =

EP by Coalesce and Boysetsfire
- Released: February 8, 2000
- Recorded: Winter 1997/1998
- Genre: Hardcore punk, metalcore
- Length: 20:20
- Label: Hydra Head Records
- Producer: Ed Rose

Coalesce and Boysetsfire chronology
Crush 'Em All Vol. 1 (2000)	Coalesce / Boysetsfire (2000)	After the Eulogy (2001)

The Coalesce / Boysetsfire is a split EP released in 2000. It featured six tracks: two covers of Boysetsfire by Coalesce, two Coalesce covers by Boysetsfire, and an original song from each band.

== Track listing ==
All tracks are written by Boysetsfire, except for "Bob Junior", written by Coalesce

Performed by Coalesce
No.	Title	Length
1.	"Vehicle"	3:00
2.	"In the Wilderness"	3:12
3.	"Bob Junior"	3:21

All tracks are written by Coalesce, except for "Nailbomb", written by Boysetsfire

Performed by Boysetsfire
No.	Title	Length
4.	"73 C"	3:15
5.	"Simulcast"	4:25
6.	"Nailbomb"	3:01

== Background ==
This one caused much drama and hurt feelings. I did an interview with BSF for Second Nature Fanzine at a more than music fest. I remember being way into this band and that song with "I am no one I am nothing" in it. I remember pushing coalesce into this as they weren't really into it. I think they tried to find the "bro" link in it as we were both on 800 Pound Gorilla publishing. Either way, they agreed to do it. Maybe the dude from Immigrant Sun records had the idea, but regardless I was the one gunning for it with the band. But for some reason it was supposed to come out on Immigrant Sun records, and a bunch of factors made the recording take a long time. We were being Coalesce with our infighting, and disappearing and stuff, and I think BSF had some scheduling issues. While we were waiting to do this record, the Get Up Kids split came up and we did it. The guy from Immigrant Sun was super pissed at me, stating that we had stolen the idea of doing split 7″ records, and that we ruined the BSF split, and that I was a dick, etc, etc. I found him to be irrational, and we pulled the record from him, and compensated him later with Hydra Head copies for whatever reason (I must not have been that big a dick maybe). I remember pitching it to Initial Records, and they didn't want it because of the perceived controversy, then I pitched it to Aaron at Hydra Head and he said "I don't give a shit". So it went to HH. I remember talking to one of the BSF dudes through the whole thing, getting permission from them at each step of the way from pulling it to putting it out on HH, and they agreed. Then we played at Krazy Fest and the Immigrant Sun dude was there still upset, saying all sorts of hurt feelingsy (yes, i make up words now) type things that weren't true. I remember lamenting to the BSF dudes backstage "isn't that crazy" and their reply was "Well, Sean, we didn't actually hear the conversations you had", effectively calling me a liar. I was pretty hurt and wrote them off as a bunch of cowards at that point, more interested in public opinion and their silly boycott of Conquer The World Records (look at their liner notes on the original 7″). Our old publisher did their tracks and really built us up on how rad theirs were and that we had better of done as good a job. We finally got to listen to them in L.A., and I remember it going over like a weak fart. Nothing against them, you can't always capture that magic we lucked out on with the guk one, and I don't think they really understood us as a band on any level. Plus their engineer really built it up to Star Wars Prequel proportions. My attitude towards the guys in the band have kinda soured my opinion of the songs which is unfortunate. All the songs on it were good, ours and theirs, but from my perspective, we should have abandoned it before it started, doing splits with bands without that "bro" factor shoudn't be done by us. Period. - Sean Ingram

— https://alloverthistown.wordpress.com/2010/04/29/coalesce-covered-in-covers/

== Personnel ==
=== Bands ===
Coalesce

- Sean Ingram – vocals
- James Dewees – drums
- Stacy Hilt – bass
- Jes Steineger – guitar

Boysetsfire

- Nathan Gray – vocals, keyboard
- Josh Latshaw – guitar, vocals
- Chad Istvan – guitar, vocals, piano, keyboard
- Robert Ehrenbrand – bass guitar, vocals
- Matt Krupanski – drums

=== Production ===
- Ed Rose – producer, engineer, mixing (Coalesce tracks)
- Jacob Bannon – artwork, layout design, construction
