= Moving Mountains (The Casket Lottery album) =

Studio album by The Casket Lottery
- Released: April 4, 2000
- Genre: Indie Rock, Emo
- Length: 28:40
- Label: Second Nature Recordings
- Producer: Ed Rose

The Casket Lottery chronology
Choose Bronze (1999)	Moving Mountains (2000)	Survival Is For Cowards (2002)

Singles from Moving Mountains

Professional ratings
Review scores
Source	Rating
Allmusic	3/5 stars

Moving Mountains is the second album by The Casket Lottery. The cover and insert images are from Katsushika Hokusai's woodblock prints from his Thirty-six Views of Mount Fuji series.

== Track listing ==
1. "Dead Dear" - 3:44
2. "Rip Van Winkle" - 2:44
3. "Vista Point" - 2:37
4. "Jealousy On Tap" - 2:51
5. "Thousand Oaks (Away From Home)" - 3:16
6. "Ancient Injury" - 3:26
7. "Stolen Honda" - 2:54
8. "Keep Searching" - 2:52
9. "Optimist Honor Roll" - 4:11

== Personnel ==
- Nathan Ellis (Guitar, Vocals)
- Stacy Hilt (Bass, Vocals)
- Nathan Richardson (Drums)
- Sean Ingram (Vocals on "A Dead Dear")
