= The Day the Sun Went Out =

Studio album by BoySetsFire
- Released: October 7, 1997
- Recorded: March 1997
- Studio: Recorded at Clay Creek Studios
- Genres: Post-hardcore, melodic hardcore, emo
- Length: 32:40
- Labels: Initial, Equal Vision
- Producers: BoySetsFire, Andy Rich

BoySetsFire chronology
| This Crying, This Screaming, My Voice Is Being Born (1996) | The Day the Sun Went Out (1997) | In Chrysalis (1998) |

Professional ratings
Review scores
| Source | Rating |
|---|---|
| AllMusic | 4.5/5 stars |

The Day the Sun Went Out is the debut studio album by Delaware band BoySetsFire. It was originally released in 1997 on Initial Records and was re-released in a remastered format in 2005 by Equal Vision Records.

== Track listing ==
| No. | Title | Length |
|---|---|---|
| 1. | "Pure" | 1:44 |
| 2. | "Cringe" | 1:54 |
| 3. | "The Fine Art of Falling" | 2:59 |
| 4. | "Another Badge of Courage" | 2:27 |
| 5. | "Swingset" | 2:59 |
| 6. | "The Power Remains the Same" | 3:27 |
| 7. | "In Hope" | 3:41 |
| 8. | "Toy Gun Anthem" | 2:37 |
| 9. | "Cadence" | 3:07 |
| 10. | "65 Factory Outlets" | 1:54 |
| 11. | "Hometown Report Card" | 5:51 |
| Total length: | | 32:40 |

Bonus track
| No. | Title | Writer(s) | Length |
|---|---|---|---|
| 1. | "Live Wire" | Mötley Crüe | 3:47 |
