= The Misery Index: Notes from the Plague Years =

Studio album by BoySetsFire
- Released: March 21, 2006
- Recorded: 2003–2006
- Genres: Post-hardcore, melodic hardcore
- Length: 50:44
- Labels: Equal Vision, Burning Heart
- Producer: BoySetsFire

BoySetsFire chronology
Tomorrow Come Today (2003)	The Misery Index: Notes from the Plague Years (2006)	While a Nation Sleeps... (2013)

Professional ratings
Review scores
Source	Rating
AllMusic	4/5 stars
Punknews.org	4.5/5 stars

The Misery Index: Notes from the Plague Years is the fourth studio album by BoySetsFire. The album was released on March 21, 2006.

== Track listing ==
No.	Title	Length
1.	"Walk Astray"	4:40
2.	"Requiem"	4:13
3.	"Final Communiqué"	1:56
4.	"The Misery Index"	4:10
5.	"(10) And Counting"	3:32
6.	"Falling Out Theme"	3:46
7.	"Empire"	3:37
8.	"So Long... And Thanks For The Crutches"	3:10
9.	"White Cold Eyes"	3:43
10.	"Deja Coup"	2:54
11.	"Social Register Fanclub"	3:03
12.	"Nostalgic For Guillotines"	4:35
13.	"A Far Cry"	7:25
Total length:		50:44

== Personnel ==
Personnel

- Nat Gray – Vocals, keyboard, lap steel guitar
- Josh Latshaw – Guitar, backing vocals
- Chad Istvan – Guitar, lap steel guitar, keyboard, backing vocals
- Robert Ehrenbrand – Bass guitar, guitar, backing vocals
- Matt Krupanski – Drums, percussion

Additional personnel

- Elyse Mitchell – Cello
- Drew Copeland – Trombone, trumpet
- Darby DiNatale – Piano
- Nick Rotundo – Double bass
