= There Is Nothing New Under the Sun =

There is Nothing New Under the Sun

EP by Coalesce
- Released: May 18, 1999
- Recorded: September 4–17, 1998
- Studios: Red House Studios, Lawrence, Kansas
- Genre: Metalcore
- Length: 28:22
- Label: Hydra Head
- Producer: Ed Rose

Coalesce chronology
Functioning on Impatience (1998)	There is Nothing New Under the Sun (1999)	0:12 Revolution in Just Listening (1999)

Alternative cover
- Alternative cover for the 2007 re-release

Professional ratings
Review scores
Source	Rating
Allmusic	3/5 stars
Exclaim!	Favorable
Scene Point Blank	8/10 stars
Your Last Rites	Mixed

There is Nothing New Under the Sun is an EP by American metalcore band Coalesce which features the band covering songs by Led Zeppelin, which was originally released on May 18, 1999, through Hydra Head Records. In 2007, the recording was re-released by Hydra Head Records, which included the full original EP with re-recorded vocal tracks, a new master and all of the Coalesce tracks from their split EPs with The Get Up Kids, Today is the Day and Boy Sets Fire. The initial idea behind the covers album was to not only emulate Garage Days Re-Revisited, a Metallica album composed of covers, but to also allow for guitarist Jes Steineger to establish a musical connection with his father, as he was a fan of Led Zeppelin.

== Track listing ==
There is Nothing New Under the Sun (1999)
No.	Title	Writer(s)	Length
1.	"Immigrant Song"	Page, Plant	2:28
2.	"Heartbreaker"	Page, Plant, Jones, Bonham	3:39
3.	"Black Dog"	Page, Plant, Jones	4:10
4.	"Out on the Tiles"	Page, Plant, Bonham	3:54
5.	"Whole Lotta Love"	Page, Plant, Jones, Bonham, Dixon	3:59
6.	"That's the Way"	Page, Plant	5:04
7.	"Thank You"	Page, Plant	4:59

2007 expanded edition bonus tracks
No.	Title	Writer(s)	Length
8.	"I'm Giving Up On This One" (The Get Up Kids cover)	Pryor, Suptic, Rob Pope, Ryan Pope	2:17
9.	"Vehicle" (Boysetsfire cover)	Gray, Istvan, Ehrenbrand, Latshaw	3:00
10.	"In the Wilderness" (Boysetsfire cover)	Gray, Istvan, Ehrenbrand, Latshaw	3:12
11.	"Bob Junior"	Ingram, Steineger, Ellis, Richardson	3:19
12.	"Supernaut" (Black Sabbath cover)	Butler, Iommi, Osbourne, Ward	3:20
13.	"Cutting Away" (Undertow cover)	Pettibone, Holcomb, Johnston, Murphy	3:05
14.	"That's the Way" (redux)	Page, Plant	5:04
15.	"Thank You" (redux)	Page, Plant	4:44
Total length:			56:23

== Personnel ==
=== Band ===
- Sean Ingram – vocals
- James Dewees – drums, vocals
- Nathan Ellis – bass
- Jes Steineger – guitar

=== Additional musicians ===
- Matt Pryor – vocals

=== Production ===
- Ed Rose – producer, engineer, mixing
- Nick Zampiello – mastering
- Dave Merullo – mastering

=== Design ===
- James O'Mara – photography, construction
- Aaron Turner – art direction
- David Lynch – photography
