= With the Sureness of Sleepwalking =

Studio album by The Esoteric
- Released: 2005

With the Sureness of Sleepwalking is an album by the band The Esoteric. It was released in 2005.

== Track listing ==
1. "Disappearing..."
2. "Ram-Faced Boy"
3. "His Eternal Enemy"
4. "Your New Burden"
5. "Unavoidable Conclusion"
6. "This Is Dedicated to the Prettiest One"
7. "Somnambulist"
8. "Make Fine Dreams"
9. "To Keep Truth to Oneself"
10. "The Curse of Greyface"
11. "A Fool's Errand"
12. "Until The Grave Gives Up the Ghost"
13. "Mapping the Fall"
