= Lost Songs (The Appleseed Cast album) =

Studio album by The Appleseed Cast
- Released: October 22, 2002
- Recorded: May 14, 1999–May 2002
- Genre: Emo, indie rock, post-hardcore
- Length: 39:58
- Label: Deep Elm

The Appleseed Cast chronology
Low Level Owl, Vol. 2 (2001)	Lost Songs (2002)	Two Conversations (2003)

Professional ratings
Review scores
Source	Rating
Allmusic	3/5 stars

Lost Songs is a compilation album of previously unreleased material by the Appleseed Cast, released on Deep Elm Records in 2002 (see 2002 in music).

== Track listing ==
1. "E to W" (3:43)
2. "Peril (Parts 1, 2 and 3)" (6:57)
3. "Novice" (4:24)
4. "Facing North" (3:42)
5. "Take" (2:13)
6. "State N w/K" (2:38)
7. "House on a Hill" (5:51)
8. "Beach Gray" (3:06)
9. "Novice Ambient Cannibalization" (7:26)
