= Illumination Ritual =

Studio album by The Appleseed Cast
- Released: April 23, 2013
- Genre: Indie rock, post-rock
- Length: 44:07
- Label: Graveface Records

The Appleseed Cast chronology
Sagarmatha (2009)	Illumination Ritual (2013)	The Fleeting Light of Impermanence (2019)

Professional ratings
Aggregate scores
Source	Rating
Metacritic	73/100
Review scores
Source	Rating
Allmusic	3.5/5 stars
Alternative Press	3.5/5 stars
Consequence of Sound	C+
Pitchfork Media	6.9/10
Popmatters	7/10 discs
Punknews.org	4/5 stars

Illumination Ritual is the eighth full-length album by Lawrence, Kansas-based Indie Rock group the Appleseed Cast, released on April 23, 2013 by Graveface Records.

== Track listing ==
1. "Adriatic to Black Sea" - 5:28
2. "Great Lake Derelict" - 4:36
3. "Simple Forms" - 2:41
4. "Cathedral Rings" - 4:37
5. "30 Degrees 3 AM" - 4:15
6. "Branches on the Arrow Peak Revelation" - 3:01
7. "Barrier Islands (Do We Remain)" - 4:12
8. "North Star Ordination" - 6:01
9. "Clearing Life" - 5:14
10. "Illumination Ritual" - 4:02
