= Lost Song =

Lost Song may refer to:

- Lost Song (TV series), a 2018 Japanese anime series
- Lost Song (film), a 2008 Canadian film
- Sword Art Online: Lost Song, a 2015 Japanese video game
- "The Lost Song", a 2003 song by the Cat Empire from their self-titled debut
- Lostwave, a genre of songs with little to no information available about their origins, often dubbed "lost"

== See also ==
- Lost Songs (disambiguation)
- Lost (disambiguation), for songs named "Lost"
