= Ox (album) =

OX

Studio album by Coalesce
- Released: June 9, 2009
- Recorded: Early 2009 at Blacklodge Studios
- Genres: Metalcore, mathcore
- Length: 35:46
- Label: Relapse
- Producer: Ed Rose

Coalesce chronology
| 0:12 Revolution in Just Listening (1999) | OX (2009) | OXEP (2009) |

Professional ratings
Review scores
| Source | Rating |
|---|---|
| Allmusic | link |
| Alternative Press | 4/5 stars |
| Decibel | link |
| DecoyMusic.com | link |

OX is the fourth studio album by American metalcore band Coalesce, released on June 9, 2009 through Relapse Records. It is the band's first studio album released since 1999's 0:12 Revolution in Just Listening. OX became Coalesce's first charting release, peaking at number 28 on the US Top Heatseekers chart.

== Track listing ==
All songs written by Coalesce.

| No. | Title | Length |
|---|---|---|
| 1. | "The Plot Against My Love" | 2:59 |
| 2. | "The Comedian in Question" | 1:40 |
| 3. | "Wild Ox Moan" | 3:30 |
| 4. | "Designed to Break a Man" | 2:35 |
| 5. | "Where Satires Sour" | 0:49 |
| 6. | "The Villain We Won't Deny" | 2:11 |
| 7. | "The Purveyor of Novelty and Nonsense" | 3:29 |
| 8. | "In My Wake, For My Own" | 3:21 |
| 9. | "New Voids in One's Resolve" | 2:31 |
| 10. | "We Have Lost Our Will" | 1:23 |
| 11. | "Questions to Root Out Fools" | 2:47 |
| 12. | "By What We Refuse" | 3:35 |
| 13. | "Dead Is Dead" | 2:06 |
| 14. | "There Is a Word Hidden in the Ground" | 2:50 |

== Personnel ==
- Sean Ingram – vocals
- Jes Steineger – guitar
- Nathan Ellis – bass
- Nathan "Jr." Richardson – drums
- Produced, Engineered & Mixed by Ed Rose
- Mastered by Mike Fossenkemper
