= Give Them Rope =

Studio album by Coalesce
- Released: June 1, 1997
- Recorded: 1996
- Studio: Red House Studios, Lawrence, Kansas
- Genre: Metalcore, mathcore
- Length: 40:31
- Label: Edision
- Producer: Ed Rose

Coalesce chronology
Among the Dead We Pray for Light (1997)	Give Them Rope (1997)	Functioning on Impatience (1998)

Alternative cover
- 2004 re-issue artwork

Professional ratings
Review scores
Source	Rating
Allmusic	3/5 stars
The Encyclopedia of Popular Music	4/5 stars
Lambgoat	9/10
Punknews.org	4/5 stars

Give Them Rope is the debut full-length album by American metalcore band Coalesce, originally released on June 1, 1997, through Edision Recordings. It was re-released in 2004 in a remastered and remixed format under the name Give Them Rope, She Said with new artwork. A two-disc deluxe compact disc edition was released by Relapse Records in 2011, this time using the original artwork and title. This album has never charted.

== Track listing ==
No.	Title	Length
1.	"Have Patience"	3:11
2.	"One on the Ground"	3:42
3.	"Cut to Length"	3:07
4.	"For All You Are"	3:30
5.	"Still It Sells"	5:47
6.	"Chain Smoking"	3:41
7.	"Did It Pay the Rent?"	4:54
8.	"Every Reason To"	3:36
9.	"I Am Not the First"	0:58
10.	"This Is the Last"	4:04
11.	"I Took a Year"	4:01

== Personnel ==
Coalesce

- James Dewees – drums
- Stacey Hilt – bass guitar
- Sean Ingram – vocals, art direction (2004 edition)
- Jes Stienger – guitar, liner notes (2011 edition)

Production

- Ed Rose – engineering, production, remixing on reissues
- Keith Chirgin – mastering
- Morgan Walker – mastering
- Dave Matousek – remastering (2004 edition)
- Reid Otto – remastering (2011 edition)

Artwork

- Dan Askew – design, layout
- Justin Berucki – photography
- Kevin Lysaght – photography
- Paul D'Elia – photography
- Matthew Daley – cover artwork (2004 edition)
- Joe Chavez – layout (2004 edition)
- Jacob Spies – art direction, design, layout (2011 edition)
- Andre Hutchison – photography (2011 edition)
- Bob Peele – photography (2011 edition)
- Celeste Peterson – photography (2011 edition)
- Mike Thomas – photography (2011 edition)

== Release history ==
Region	Date	Label	Format	Catalog	Notes
United States	June 1, 1997	Edision Recordings	LP, CD, CS	edison 006	
United States	June 1, 2004	Edision Recordings	CD	edison 006	Remastered edition, features new artwork and is titled Give Them Rope, She Said V2.0. LP edition released by No Idea would later be repressed in 2008.
United States	June 1, 2004	Blue Collar Distro	CD	BCD01	Remastered edition, features new artwork and is titled Give Them Rope, She Said V2.0. LP edition released by No Idea would later be repressed in 2008.
United States	June 1, 2004	No Idea Records	LP	NIR-153	Remastered edition, features new artwork and is titled Give Them Rope, She Said V2.0. LP edition released by No Idea would later be repressed in 2008.
United States	November 22, 2011	Relapse Records	2xCD	RR7160	Two-disc set, first disc is the original mix of the album, the second disc is the 2004 remaster edition.
United States	November 22, 2011	No Sleep Records	2xLP	NSR059	Two-disc set, first disc is the original mix of the album, the second disc is the 2004 remaster edition.
