= Functioning on Impatience =

Studio album by Coalesce
- Released: November 18, 1998
- Recorded: 1998
- Studio: Red House Studios, Lawrence, Kansas
- Genre: Metalcore, mathcore
- Length: 20:06
- Label: Second Nature
- Producer: Ed Rose

Coalesce chronology
Give Them Rope (1998)	Functioning on Impatience (1998)	There Is Nothing New Under the Sun (1998)

Professional ratings
Review scores
Source	Rating
Allmusic	4/5 stars

Functioning on Impatience is the second full-length album by American metalcore band Coalesce, originally released in 1998 through Second Nature Recordings. The LP edition of the record was repressed for the album's 10th anniversary in 2008, featuring a uniquely cut sleeve shaped after the rib cage on the cover art. The CD edition features a transparent front insert.

== Track listing ==
All tracks are written by Coalesce.

Functioning On Impatience
No.	Title	Length
1.	"You Can't Kill Us All"	3:15
2.	"Recurring Ache of Monotony Still Running"	2:11
3.	"A New Language"	2:14
4.	"On Being a Bastard"	3:04
5.	"My Love for Extremes"	3:39
6.	"Measured in Gray"	3:05
7.	"A Disgust for Details"	2:36

== Personnel ==
Coalesce

- James Dewees – drums
- Nathan Ellis – bass, vocals
- Sean Ingram – lead vocals
- Jes Steineger – guitar, vocals

Production

- Ed Rose – Producer, Engineer
- Steve Heritage – Mastering

Design

- Carrie Whitney – Photography
- Matt Jones – Art direction, design
