= Inside the Torn Apart =

Studio album by Napalm Death
- Released: 3 June 1997
- Recorded: Framework Studios, Birmingham, England
- Genre: Deathgrind
- Length: 39:31
- Label: Earache
- Producer: Colin Richardson

Napalm Death chronology
In Tongues We Speak (1997)	Inside the Torn Apart (1997)	Breed to Breathe (1997)

Professional ratings
Review scores
Source	Rating
AllMusic	3/5 stars
Chronicles of Chaos	8/10
Collector's Guide to Heavy Metal	7/10
MetalReviews	71/100
The Encyclopedia of Popular Music	2/5 stars
Sea of Tranquility	2/5 stars

Inside the Torn Apart is the seventh studio album by British extreme metal band Napalm Death. It was released by Earache in June 1997 on double vinyl, regular CD, digipak CD and MC.

== Track listing ==
All lyrics are written by Shane Embury, except where noted.

No.	Title	Lyrics	Music	Length
1.	"Breed to Breathe"		Embury	3:16
2.	"Birth in Regress"	Mitch Harris	Harris	3:32
3.	"Section"		Embury	2:45
4.	"Reflect on Conflict"		Jesse Pintado	3:15
5.	"Down in the Zero"		Embury	3:09
6.	"Inside the Torn Apart"		Embury	3:46
7.	"If Symptoms Persist"	Harris	Harris	2:41
8.	"Prelude"		Pintado	3:11
9.	"Indispose"	Harris	Harris	3:04
10.	"Purist Realist"	Embury, Harris	Pintado	2:58
11.	"Lowpoint"		Embury	3:15
12.	"The Lifeless Alarm"		Harris	4:39

Digipak CD bonus tracks
No.	Title	Music	Length
13.	"Time Will Come"	Harris	3:22
14.	"Bled Dry"	Pintado	2:21

== Personnel ==
=== Napalm Death ===
- Mark "Barney" Greenway – lead vocals
- Jesse Pintado – guitar
- Mitch Harris – guitar, backing vocals
- Shane Embury – bass, backing vocals
- Danny Herrera – drums

=== Technical personnel ===
- Colin Richardson – production
- Paul Siddens – recording engineering
- Andy Sneap – mix engineering
- Tony Wooliscroft – band photography
- Graham Humphreys – design, layout
