= Small Brown Bike =

American emo/post-hardcore band

- Origin: Marshall, Michigan, United States
- Genres: Punk rock, emo, post-hardcore
- Years active: 1996–2004, 2009–present
- Labels: No Ideas, Lookout!
- Members: Mike Reed; Ben Reed; Dan Jaquint
- Past members: Travis Dopp; Scott Flaster; Jeff Gensterblum

Small Brown Bike is a band from Marshall, Michigan, United States that started in 1996. The trademark of Small Brown Bike is their "double vocals" backed by melodies. Their sound is often identified as being similar to other post-hardcore bands, such as Avail, Hot Water Music and Dillinger Four. Throughout their existence, Small Brown Bike have toured three times with Dead Season between 1999 and 2000 and once with Thoughts of Ionesco in 1999. Their last show was in 2004 at The Fireside Bowl in Chicago, after already agreeing to split up. Former members Mike Reed and Dan Jaquint later created the band LaSalle, with Reed's wife playing bass guitar. Ben Reed also started the Great Sea Serpents based out of Chicago, IL. Mike and Ben have also formed the band Able Baker Fox with former drummer Jeff Gensterblum and Nathan Ellis from the Casket Lottery. Their first album "Voices" was released in January 2008.

The band name is derived from working on bicycles as they grew up together.

The band announced a return to songwriting on October 6, 2009, via their new website.

Guitarist Travis Dopp died of cancer on December 13, 2023.

== Reunion shows ==
The band played a few reunion shows in September 2007 to benefit a dear friend of the band who had been battling Leukemia:

- September 7, 2007 at Kratfbrau Brewery in Kalamazoo, Michigan.
- September 8, 2007 at Subterranean in Chicago, Illinois (2 shows).
- September 9, 2007 at Small's Bar in Detroit, Michigan.
- October 28, 2007 at The Fest 6 in Gainesville, Florida.

== Original members ==
- Mike Reed (guitar)
- Ben Reed (bass)
- Dan Jaquint (drums)

Former members

- Travis Dopp (guitar; died 2023)
- Jeff Gensterblum (drums)
- Scott Flaster (guitar)

== Discography ==
=== Albums ===
- Our Own Wars - 1999 on No Idea Records
- Collection (compilation) - 1999 on No Idea Records
- Dead Reckoning - 2001 on No Idea Records
- The River Bed - 2003 on Lookout! Records
- Fell & Found - 2011 on No Idea Records
- Recollected - 2013 on Old Point Light Records

=== EPs and split records ===
- Demo Tape (a.k.a. 'Chinese Handstand Demo' - limited to under 50 copies) - 1997 on Five Finger Records
- No Place Like You EP - 1997 on Salinger Press
- ..and Don't Forget Me EP - 1998 on Salinger Press
- SBB/Cursive Split - 2001 on Makoto Recordings
- SBB/The Casket Lottery Split - 2002 on Second Nature Recordings
- Nail Yourself to the Ground EP - 2003 on No Idea Records
- Composite, Volume One 7" - 2009 on No Idea Records
- Composite, Volume Two 7" - 2010 on No Idea Records

=== Music videos ===
- See You in Hell (2001)
- Safe in Sound (2003)
- On Repeat (2011)
