= After the Eulogy =

Studio album by BoySetsFire
- Released: April 25, 2000
- Recorded: 1999
- Studios: Carriage House Studios, Stamford, Connecticut
- Genres: Post-hardcore, melodic hardcore, metalcore
- Length: 47:10
- Labels: Victory, Wind-up (2001 reissue)
- Producers: BoySetsFire, Andy Katz, Nick Rotundo, Morgan Walker

BoySetsFire chronology
Coalesce / Boysetsfire (2000)	After the Eulogy (2000)	Live for Today (2002)

Professional ratings
Review scores
Source	Rating
AllMusic	4/5 stars

After the Eulogy is the second studio album by Delaware band BoySetsFire. The album was released in 2000 on Victory Records and was re-released in 2001 on Wind-up Records. The album also features the band's biggest song, "Rookie".

== Track listing ==
No.	Title	Length
1.	"After the Eulogy"	3:31
2.	"Rookie"	4:13
3.	"Pariah Under Glass"	2:22
4.	"When Rhetoric Dies"	3:40
5.	"Still Waiting for the Punchline"	2:23
6.	"The Abominations of Those Virtuous"	4:43
7.	"Our Time Honored Tradition of Cannibalism"	4:29
8.	"(Compassion) As Skull Fragments on the Wall"	2:51
9.	"My Life in the Knife Trade"	4:59
10.	"Across Five Years"	3:47
11.	"Twelve Step Hammer Program"	2:59
12.	"Unspoken Request"	3:24
13.	"The Force Majeure"	3:49
Total length:		47:10

2001 Re-release track
No.	Title	Length
1.	"Timothy"	4:18

== Pop culture appearances ==
"Rookie" was featured in the video games 1080° Avalanche and Legends of Wrestling. The song was also used on the Downhill mountain biking section of the mountain bike film Roam by The Collective.
