= Peregrine (album) =

Studio album by The Appleseed Cast
- Released: March 21, 2006
- Recorded: Pachyderm (Cannon Falls, Minnesota)
- Genre: Emo, indie rock, post-rock
- Length: 54:58
- Label: The Militia Group
- Producer: John Congleton

The Appleseed Cast chronology
Two Conversations (2003)	Peregrine (2006)	Sagarmatha (2009)

Professional ratings
Review scores
Source	Rating
AbsolutePunk.net	89%
AllMusic	3.5/5 stars
Pitchfork	7.3/10
Stylus Magazine	C+
PopMatters	8/10

Peregrine is the sixth studio album by indie rock band The Appleseed Cast, released on March 21, 2006, on The Militia Group.

== Track listing ==
The album had 13 tracks.

1. "Ceremony" – 4:17
2. "Woodland Hunter (Part 1)" – 3:16
3. "Here We Are (Family in the Hallways)" – 3:40
4. "Silas' Knife" – 4:08
5. "Mountain Halo" – 4:09
6. "Sunlit and Ascending" – 4:01
7. "February" – 3:51
8. "An Orange and a Blue" – 4:11
9. "Song 3" – 5:00
10. "Woodland Hunter (Part 2)" – 4:30
11. "Peregrine" – 4:06
12. "A Fate Delivered" – 3:53
13. "The Clock and the Storm" – 5:54
14. "Rendition" (Japan Bonus Track) – 4:03
