= Tomorrow Come Today =

Studio album by BoySetsFire
- Released: April 1, 2003
- Recorded: 2002
- Studios: Ocean, Burbank, California / Cello, Hollywood, California / Mama Joe's Recording, North Hollywood, California
- Genres: Post-hardcore, aggro metal
- Length: 51:26
- Label: Wind-up
- Producer: Dave Fortman

BoySetsFire chronology
Live for Today (2002)	Tomorrow Come Today (2003)	The Misery Index: Notes from the Plague Years (2006)

Singles from Tomorrow Come Today
- 1. "Last Year's Nest" Released: May 19, 2003

Tomorrow Come Today is the third studio album by Delaware band BoySetsFire, released on April 1, 2003.

"High Wire Escape Artist" appeared on the soundtrack to the 2003 movie Daredevil.

== Critical reception ==
Professional ratings
Review scores
Source	Rating
AllMusic	4/5 stars
Drowned in Sound	6/10
Punknews.org	4.5/5 stars
Sputnikmusic	4/5

AllMusic wrote: "Dying on Principle and Handful of Redemption might be the best songs on the album, encapsulating perfectly the band's rage, rhetoric and conscious movement toward melody." Drowned in Sound wrote that "there are only so many times you can write the same song, and Boy Sets Fire don’t really seem to have progressed from their last album proper".

== Track listing ==
#	Title	Time
1	Eviction Article	4:12
2	Last Year's Nest	3:53
3	Full Color Guilt	3:50
4	Bathory's Sainthood	4:21
5	Dying on Principle	2:45
6	Handful of Redemption	4:02
7	Release the Dogs	3:09
8	Foundations to Burn	3:49
9	Management vs. Labor	4:00
10	High Wire Escape Artist	3:48
11	White Wedding Dress	3:15
12	On in Five	10:22

== Personnel ==
- Nat Gray – lead vocals
- Chad Istvan – guitar, backing vocals
- Joshua Latshaw – guitar
- Rob Avery – bass, backing vocals
- Matt Krupanski – drums

Production

- Dave Fortman – producer
- Jeremy Parker – engineering, mastering
- Jay Baumgardner – mixing
