= Mare Vitalis =

Studio album by the Appleseed Cast
- Released: February 9, 2000
- Genre: Indie rock; post-rock; math rock
- Length: 42:00
- Label: Deep Elm
- Producer: Ed Rose, The Appleseed Cast

The Appleseed Cast chronology
The End of the Ring Wars (1998)	Mare Vitalis (2000)	Low Level Owl, Vol. 1 (2001)

Professional ratings
Review scores
Source	Rating
AllMusic	3/5 stars
Kerrang!	4/5 stars

Mare Vitalis (Latin for "Sea of Life") is the second full-length album by Lawrence, Kansas-based emo group the Appleseed Cast. It was released on Deep Elm Records in 2000.

== Critical reception ==
Exclaim! called "Storms" "a brooding, seven-and-half minute emo classic." Willamette Week called Mare Vitalis the band's "most essential album," writing that "[singer-guitarist Chris] Crisci and guitarist Aaron Pillar split the difference between their post-rock future and the driving punk that birthed the band." The Chicago Reader thought that "on 'And Nothing Less' and 'Santa Maria' the Appleseed Cast find nirvana through repetition." Vulture deemed it "oceanic indie rock." Stereogum named "Forever Longing the Golden Sunsets" in their list of "30 Emo Songs: Late 90s & Early 2000s Essentials."

== Track listing ==
No.	Title	Length
1.	"The Immortal Soul of Mundo Cani"	2:10
2.	"Fishing the Sky"	3:59
3.	"Forever Longing the Golden Sunsets"	4:42
4.	"Mare Mortis"	3:29
5.	"Santa Maria"	3:36
6.	"Secret"	4:35
7.	"...And Nothing Less"	4:51
8.	"Poseidon"	4:10
9.	"Kilgore Trout"	2:53
10.	"Storms"	7:36
11.	"Untitled (Bonus Track)" (CD & vinyl only)	12:16

== Personnel ==
The Appleseed Cast

- Chris Crispi – vocals, guitar, keyboards
- Aaron Pillar - guitar, backing vocals
- Jason Wickersheim – bass
- Josh Baruth – drums, percussion

Additional personnel

- Ed Rose – recording
- Roger Lian – mastering
- Samuel Constantine – cover painting
