= Boysetsfire (album) =

Studio album by BoySetsFire
- Released: September 25, 2015
- Genre: Post-hardcore
- Length: 44:13
- Label: Bridge 9
- Producer: Chad Istvan

BoySetsFire chronology
While a Nation Sleeps... (2013)	Boysetsfire (2015)

Professional ratings
Review scores
Source	Rating
Punknews.org	2/5 stars
Punk Rock Theory	8/10 stars

Boysetsfire is the self-titled sixth studio album by Delaware post-hardcore band BoySetsFire. It was released in September 2015 under Bridge 9 Records. The album features a re-recorded version of Bled Dry, which was originally released as a 7 inch vinyl prior to the release of While a Nation Sleeps... in 2013.

== Track listing ==
No.	Title	Length
1.	"Savage Blood"	3:03
2.	"Cutting Room Floor"	3:42
3.	"Don't Panic"	2:11
4.	"Ordinary Lives"	5:00
5.	"One Match"	3:15
6.	"The Filth Is Rising"	2:22
7.	"Torches to Paradise"	4:20
8.	"Coward"	3:11
9.	"Heaven Knows"	3:54
10.	"Fall from Grace"	4:18
11.	"Dig Your Grave"	2:51
12.	"Breath In, Bleed Out"	4:25
13.	"Bled Dry"	1:41
Total length:		44:13
