= Heartbreak Club =

- Origin: Newcastle, New South Wales, Australia
- Genres: Rock, power pop, pop punk
- Years active: 2006–present
- Labels: Independent (2009–2010); Amphead Music (2008)
- Members: Nick Green; Peter Carter; Michael Sullivan
- Past members: Gavin King
- Website: www.heartbreakclub.org

Heartbreak Club are an Australian rock and power pop band from Newcastle, New South Wales.

== History ==
Heartbreak Club were initially conceived as a parody of emo bands, recording their "...lamecore" EP in a local high school's music room in 2006. Since then, they have toured Australia multiple times, and the US in 2007.

In 2008, Heartbreak Club recorded and released their second EP 'O Tempora! O Mores!' which was produced by US producer Ed Rose and distributed by the (now defunct) Amphead.

In 2009, Australia's federal Arts Minister Peter Garrett caught wind that Dougy Lawstein had "thinned out" the lineup and immediately announced Heartbreak Club would receive a grant from the Contemporary Music Touring Program to tour through Australia.

2010 saw the independent release of Heartbreak Club's debut album 'Our Horse Is Dead', having teamed up again with Ed Rose at Sing Sing Studios in Melbourne, Australia. Singles from the album have been broadcast on Triple J, Triple M, Nova, and ABC1 television. Reviews of the album were favorable, with BLUNT and Reverb Magazine giving it 4 Stars (out of a possible 5), while Drum Media was positive.

Heartbreak Club signed a publishing contract with Centrifuge Music Publishing in 2011, publishers of Noiseworks and Steve Balbi.

Heartbreak Club (with the track 'Chin Up') were a finalist in the Rock category of the 2009 International Songwriting Competition, alongside a high proportion of fellow Australian finalists including The Living End, Eskimo Joe, and Children Collide.

== Members ==
Nick Green (as 'Teddy Hernandez'; vocals, keys)
Benjamin Law (as 'Dougy Lawstein'; upright bass, vibes)
Peter Carter (as 'Carter'; drums)
Michael Sullivan (as 'Sullo'; guitars; backing vocals)

== Discography ==
=== Albums ===
- Our Horse is Dead (2010)

=== EPs and singles ===
- "...lamecore" CD EP (2006)
- "O Tempora! O Mores!" CD EP (2008)
