= While a Nation Sleeps... =

Studio album by BoySetsFire
- Released: June 11, 2013
- Recorded: 2012
- Genres: Post-hardcore, alternative metal
- Length: 46:42
- Labels: Bridge 9, End Hits

BoySetsFire chronology
The Misery Index: Notes from the Plague Years (2006)	While a Nation Sleeps... (2013)	Boysetsfire (2015)

Professional ratings
Aggregate scores
Source	Rating
Metacritic	77/100
Review scores
Source	Rating
Exclaim!	8/10
This Is Fake DIY	7/10

While a Nation Sleeps... is the fifth studio album by American post-hardcore band BoySetsFire. It was released on June 11, 2013, under Bridge 9 Records in US and End Hits Records in Europe.

== Track listing ==
No.	Title	Length
1.	"Until Nothing Remains"	3:04
2.	"Closure"	3:03
3.	"Heads Will Roll"	2:44
4.	"Phone Call"	4:01
5.	"Everything Went Black"	3:25
6.	"Save Yourself"	3:35
7.	"Reason to Believe"	3:55
8.	"Far From Over"	2:23
9.	"Let It Bleed"	3:08
10.	"Never Said"	3:51
11.	"Wolves of Babylon"	3:17
12.	"Altar of God"	5:48
13.	"Prey"	4:28
Total length:		46:42
