= 0:12 Revolution in Just Listening =

- Cover to the original edition of the album

Studio album by Coalesce
- Released: November 16, 1999
- Studios: Red House Studios; Eudora, Kansas
- Genres: Metalcore, mathcore
- Length: 23:53
- Labels: Relapse Records, Hydra Head Records (HH666-42)
- Producer: Ed Rose

Coalesce chronology
There is Nothing New Under the Sun (1999)	0:12 Revolution in Just Listening (1999)	Ox (2009)

Alternative cover
- Cover for the 2008 re-release of the album

Professional ratings
Review scores
Source	Rating
AllMusic	4/5 stars
Chronicles of Chaos	8/10
The Encyclopedia of Popular Music	3/5 stars
Hit Parader	3/5 stars
Metal.de	6/10
Punknews.org	3/5 stars
Sputnikmusic	4.5/5

0:12 Revolution in Just Listening is the third studio album to be released by American metalcore band Coalesce, which was released on November 16, 1999, through Relapse Records. The album was recorded and released posthumously, as the group broke up prior after touring troubles and made the album as they were obliged to do so by contract. Hydra Head Records issued the vinyl edition of the album, and in 2008 Relapse released a remastered version of the album under the title 012:2. The album was included in Decibel Magazines "Hall of Fame" in 2008.

== Writing and recording ==
Prior to the album's creation, the band was in the middle of a two-legged tour across the United States. The first leg in the East Coast, the second in the West Coast. One of the destinations for the West Coast leg of the tour was in Idaho, and by the time the group reached that state, the van broke down. This ultimately resulted in their disbandment.

Because the group already received an advancement check from Relapse, they decided to record one last album to let the label issue. Guitarist Jes Steineger wrote all his parts in the span of three days on an acoustic guitar. The album was produced within a weekend, and Relapse originally sold it as an EP due to its short length.

== Track listing ==
All tracks are written by Coalesce.

0:12 Revolution in Just Listening
No.	Title	Length
1.	"What Happens on the Road Always Comes Home"	3:05
2.	"Cowards.com"	2:26
3.	"Burn Everything That Bears Our Name"	2:24
4.	"While The Jackass Operation Spins Its Wheels"	2:22
5.	"Sometimes Selling Out Is Waking Up"	3:21
6.	"Where the Hell Is Rick Thorne These Days?"	1:56
7.	"Jesus in the Year 2000/Next On the Shit List"	2:57
8.	"Counting Murders and Drinking Beer (The $46,000 Escape)"	2:33
9.	"They Always Come in Fall"	2:49

== Personnel ==
=== Band ===
- Sean Ingram – Vocals, Art direction, Design
- James Dewees – Drums
- Jes Steineger – Guitar
- Nathan Ellis – Bass

=== Production ===
- Ed Rose – Producer, Mixing
- Matthew F. Jacobson – Executive producer
- Dave Shirk – Mastering
- Scott Hull – Mastering

=== Design ===
- Don Clark – Design
- Jason Hellmann – Photography
- Dan Henk – Cover Art
