= Live for Today (EP) =

Live album by BoySetsFire
- Released: September 10, 2002
- Recorded: 2002
- Studios: Ocean Studios, California
- Genres: Post-hardcore; nu metal; hardcore punk; melodic hardcore
- Length: 23:21
- Label: Wind-up
- Producers: Dave Fortman; Brett Eliason; Jay Baumgardner (exec.)

BoySetsFire chronology
After the Eulogy (2000)	Live for Today (2002)	Tomorrow Come Today (2003)

Live for Today is a live album by BoySetsFire. It contains three studio recordings as well as three live recordings. The studio songs are from the sessions for the Tomorrow Come Today album, on which "Release the Dogs" and "Bathory's Sainthood" would eventually be released. "Curtain Call" is an exclusive song for this EP. The live songs are from the After the Eulogy and the Tomorrow Come Today albums. They were recorded at Club Krome in South Amboy, New Jersey on July 19, 2002. It was rated five stars by Punknews.org.

== Track listing ==
1. "Release the Dogs" – 3:08
2. "Bathory's Sainthood" – 4:19
3. "Curtain Call" – 3:06
4. "After the Eulogy [Live]" – 3:57
5. "Handful of Redemption [Live]" – 4:14
6. "Rookie [Live]" – 4:37
