= Two Conversations =

Studio album by The Appleseed Cast
- Released: July 14, 2003 (UK); July 22, 2003 (US)
- Genre: Emo, indie rock
- Length: 41:30
- Label: Tiger Style Records
- Producer: Ed Rose

The Appleseed Cast chronology
Low Level Owl, Vol. 2 (2001)	Two Conversations (2003)	Peregrine (2006)

Professional ratings
Review scores
Source	Rating
Allmusic	4/5 stars
Pitchfork Media	4.2/10

Two Conversations is the fifth studio album by indie rock band The Appleseed Cast, released in the U.S. on July 22, 2003 on Tiger Style Records.

== Track listing ==
All tracks are written by The Appleseed Cast.

Two Conversations
No.	Title	Length
1.	"Hello Dearest Love"	4:48
2.	"Hanging Marionette"	4:05
3.	"Ice Heavy Branches"	3:21
4.	"Losing Touching Searching"	3:56
5.	"Fight Song"	4:14
6.	"Sinking"	4:52
7.	"The Page"	2:37
8.	"Innocent Vigilant Ordinary"	3:19
9.	"How Life Can Turn"	3:33
10.	"A Dream for Us"	6:51
11.	"The State That I Was In" (Spain bonus track)	4:04
Total length:		41:30

== Personnel ==
The Appleseed Cast

- Christopher Crisci – vocals, rhythm guitar
- Jordan Geiger – keyboards
- Aaron Pillar – lead guitar
- Marc Young – bass
- Josh Baruth – drums

Artwork

- Travis Pesnell – album artwork
- Nick Pimentel – design, layout

Production

- Ed Rose – producer, engineer
