= The Esoteric =

American metalcore band

- Origin: Lawrence, Kansas, U.S.
- Genres: Mathcore, metalcore, grindcore
- Years active: 1996–present
- Label: Prosthetic
- Members: Stevie Cruz; Eric Graves; Anthony Diale; Adam Mitchell
- Past members: Andrew M. Fisher; Adam "Hammerlord" Mitchell
- Website: the-esoteric.com

The Esoteric is an American metalcore band founded in 1996 from Lawrence, Kansas. They are currently signed to Prosthetic Records. Following several self-produced EPs, the band's major label debut, With the Sureness of Sleepwalking, came out on Prosthetic Records in 2005. Their follow-up, Subverter, was released on Prosthetic in 2006, and received good reception from online blogs and music magazines.

The Kansas outfit is quick to point out and pay homage to their influences and support their fellow local bands. The band has toured with the likes of Himsa, Mastodon, Dog Fashion Disco, Mindless Self-Indulgence, Scarlet, Calico System, and Fight Paris.

On January 1, 2007, the band announced the departures of guitarist Cory White and drummer Marshall Kilpatric. White left the band based on personal reasons while Kilpatric relocated to Los Angeles to join Black Light Burns. Former drummer Adam 'Hammerlord' Mitchell retook the throne at the drums for a short Canadian tour. Although not officially reformed, White and Kilpatrick rejoined the band for a few select shows in the Kansas City area in 2009 including the American Waste Festival. In 2011, the band covered the track "Iron Clad Lou" for the compilation album Songs of Farewell and Departure: A Tribute To HUM.

== Current lineup ==
- Eric Graves – guitar
- Anthony Diale – bass
- Stevie Cruz – vocals
- Marshall Kilpatrick – drums, percussion
- Cory White – guitar

== Discography ==
Title	Year	Notes
Esoteric EP	1998	
Mowdown Music Compilation	1999	Compilation
Derailer Split	1999	Split
An Illusion of Sacred Circumstances	1999	
Malicious Intent: Ultimus Dies Sepulcris	2001	Compilation
Lifeless Records 2001 Compilation	2001	Compilation
Plagued by Visions	2001	
Live at CBGB's NYC (with Luddite Clone)	2001	Split (live)
Loaded in Lawrence	2002	Compilation
Roads Between (with Saved By Grace)	2002	Split
A Reason to Breathe EP	2002	
Wormwood Split	2003	Split
1336 EP	2004	
With the Sureness of Sleepwalking	2005	
Subverter	2006	
For the Sick: A Tribute to Eyehategod	2007	Compilation (tribute album)
