= Let's Live for Today =

Let's Live for Today may refer to:

- Let's Live for Today (album), a 1967 album by the Grass Roots
- "Let's Live for Today" (song), a 1967 song popularized by the Grass Roots
