= The Casket Lottery =

American indie rock band

- Origin: Kansas City, Missouri
- Genres: Indie rock, post-hardcore, emo
- Years active: 1997–2006; 2010–present
- Labels: Second Nature, Big Scary Monsters, No Sleep, Iodine
- Members: Nathan Ellis; Gene Abramov; Jeff Gensterblum; Terrence Vitali
- Past members: Stacy Hilt; Nathan Richardson; Brent Windler; Nick Siegel; Jason Trabue

The Casket Lottery is an American indie rock band from Kansas City, Missouri signed to Second Nature Recordings and Big Scary Monsters. It was founded by Nathan Ellis and Stacy Hilt in the 1990s.

== History ==
=== 1997 ===
The band started in 1997 after Nathan Ellis spent time on the road with Coalesce. He and Stacy Hilt struck up an instant friendship and love for music beyond the hardcore and metal roots of Coalesce. After leaving Coalesce in the fall of 1997, Ellis assumed bass duties, filling the hole left by Stacy's departure. A chance meeting at a local benefit show reunited Nathan and Stacy once again, at which time he presented Stacy with the basement tracks that would end up on the Diver cassette and Dot, Dot. They found a perfect complement to their musical background in a then 15-year-old drumming phenom Nathan (Jr.) Richardson. The band has toured across the United States numerous times (with Reflector, Small Brown Bike, Rocky Votolato, Proudentall, and Limbeck among others), and has released a healthy number of records.

=== 2006–present ===
In mid-2006, the band went on hiatus. Singer Nathan Ellis worked on a record and played shows with his new bands Jackie Carol and Able Baker Fox, and drummer Nathan "Junior" Richardson joined The Appleseed Cast, completing several tours as well as recording on their album Peregrine. He subsequently quit The Appleseed Cast in late 2006. Both Nathans have joined Coalesce on various reunion tours since 2005.

In 2010, the band reunited as special guest at a Coalesce show in their hometown. They also reformed in early 2011 to play shows with recently reunited friends in Small Brown Bike. In late August of 2011, they announced via their Facebook page that they were to enter the studio with Ed Rose to record a new album.

On August 30, 2011, The Casket Lottery announced that they were recording new material with Ed Rose at Black Lodge, which was followed by an announcement on January 9, 2012, that the new material would be released via No Sleep Records later that year. The band's fourth studio album, Real Fear, was released on November 6, 2012.

In 2017, Run for Cover Records approached the band about re-releasing their first three LPs on vinyl. Nathan Ellis and Stacy Hilt were interested, but Nathan Richardson was busy pursuing a career in the medical field. Ellis and Hilt, with Richardson's blessing, approached longtime friend Jason Trabue of Hopesfall to fill the seat left by Richardson's departure. The band practiced throughout 2017 to prepare for their first US tours since 2004.

In January 2020, the band started recording their fifth full-length album at B-24 Studios in Kansas City, MO, with producer Ed Rose and engineer Josh Barber. The album, Short Songs for End Times, was released on November 6, 2020.

On April 2, 2025, the band signed to Iodine Recordings. On May 29, they announced their sixth studio album, Feel the Teeth, released on August 29 of that year.

== Members ==
- Nathan Ellis (guitar, vocals)
- Gene Abramov (bass)
- Jeff Gensterblum (drums)
- Terrence Vitali (guitar, vocals)

== Past members ==
- Stacy Hilt
- Nathan Richardson
- Brent Windler
- Nick Siegel
- Jason Trabue

== Discography ==
=== Studio albums ===
- Choose Bronze – 1999 on Second Nature Recordings
- Moving Mountains – 2000 on Second Nature Recordings
- Survival Is for Cowards – 2002 on Second Nature Recordings
- Real Fear – 2012 on No Sleep Records
- Short Songs for End Times - 2020 on Wiretap Records, Second Nature Recordings and Big Scary Monsters (EU/UK)
- Feel the Teeth - 2025 on Iodine Recordings

=== EPs and split records ===
- The Diver: Cassette Demo – 1998
- Dot Dot Dash Something or Other Dot EP – 1999 on Status Records
- The Casket Lottery/Reflector Split – 1999 on Undecided Records
- The Casket Lottery/Waxwing Split – 2000 on Second Nature Recordings
- Lost at Sea 7" – 2000 on Status Records
- Blessed/Cursed EP – 2000 on Second Nature Recordings
- The Casket Lottery/Small Brown Bike Split – 2002 on Second Nature Recordings
- The Casket Lottery/Hot Water Music Split – 2002 on Second Nature Recordings
- Smoke and Mirrors EP – 2004 on Second Nature Recordings
- The Door 7" – 2012 on No Sleep Records
- Touché Amoré / The Casket Lottery – 2012 on No Sleep Records

=== Compilations ===
- Possiblies and Maybes – 2003 on Second Nature Recordings
