= BoySetsFire =

American post-hardcore band

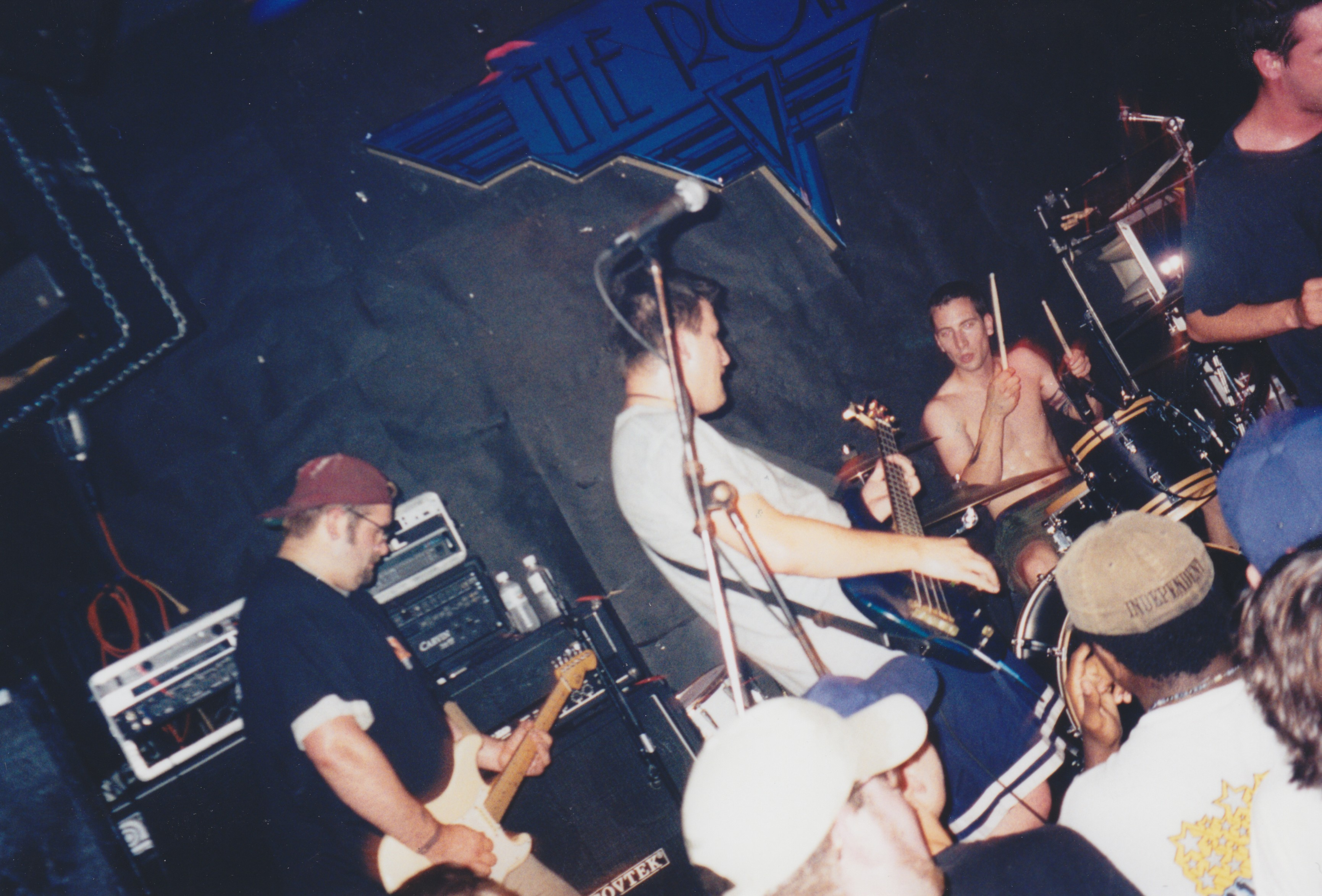

Background information
- Origin: Newark, Delaware, U.S.
- Genres: Post-hardcore, emo, melodic hardcore, punk rock
- Years active: 1994–2007, 2010–present
- Labels: Burning Heart, Wind-up, Equal Vision, Undecided, Bridge 9, Conquer the World, Cascade, End Hits
- Members: Nat Gray; Chad Istvan; Josh Latshaw; Robert Ehrenbrand; Chris Rakus; Jared Shavelson
- Past members: Rob Avery; Darrell Hyde; Matt Krupanski; Marc Krupanski; Dan Pelic; Lee Dickerson

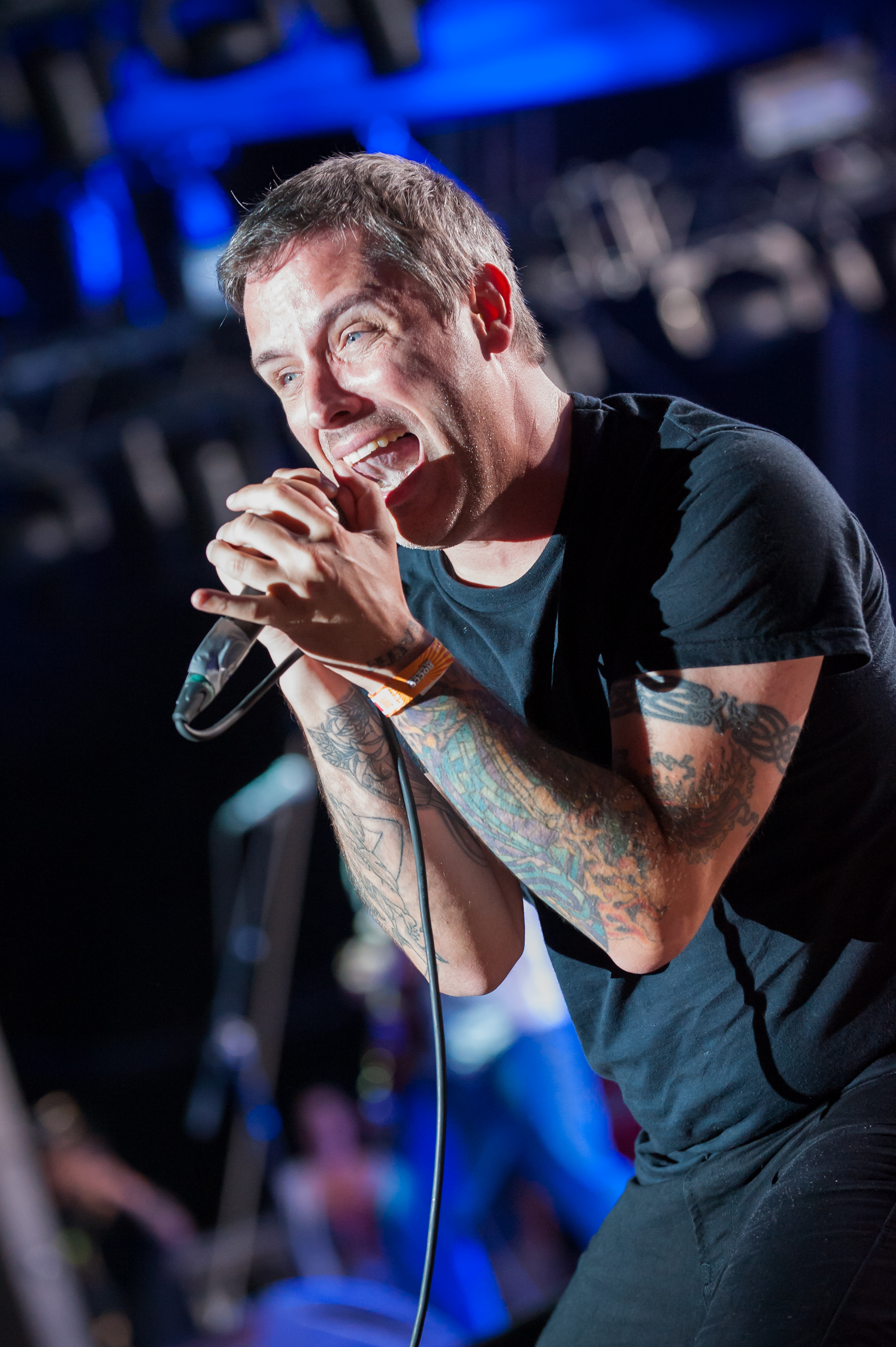
Nat Gray on stage

BoySetsFire is an American post-hardcore band from Newark, Delaware. Formed in October 1994, BoySetsFire is composed of guitarists Chad Istvan and Josh Latshaw, vocalist Nat Gray, drummer Jared Shavelson, and bassists Chris Rakus and Robert Ehrenbrand. Their lyrical themes are politically driven.

== Biography ==
BoySetsFire released their first demo albums in late 1994 and early 1995. In 1996, the band released their first EP, This Crying, This Screaming, My Voice Is Being Born. In 1997, they signed a contract with Initial Records and recorded their first album, The Day the Sun Went Out.

In 1999, their second album, After the Eulogy was recorded, and BoySetsFire went on tour with Snapcase, as well as on Vans Warped tour. BoySetsFire then released a split-EP with Snapcase in 1999, as well as the Crush 'Em All Vol. 1 Metallica tribute with Shai Hulud for Undecided Records, and another with Coalesce in 2000. Their former bassist was replaced by Rob Avery. After being signed to Victory Records, the band moved to Wind-up, an independent label distributed by Sony in the US. Tomorrow Come Today was then released in 2003.

Following a dispute with Wind-up, in 2005 the band signed to the independent record label Burning Heart Records for worldwide distribution and Equal Vision Records for North American distribution. The album The Misery Index: Notes from the Plague Years was released in March 2006.

=== Brief hiatus ===
On July 31, 2006, the band informed the fans about its retirement through their official website. There was a farewell European tour in late summer; however, guitarist Josh Latshaw severely injured himself prior to its start. As a result, the band played those shows with roadie Chris "The Reverend" Rakus at the guitar instead, but returned to Europe in May 2007 to give Latshaw the chance to say goodbye to the European fans.

The band's final performance took place on June 9, 2007, in Philadelphia, Pennsylvania at the Trocadero Theatre. A DVD has been released of this show in its entirety as well as parts of the final European tour.

On February 12, 2007, lead vocalist Nat Gray announced that they were forming a new band by the name of The Casting Out. While the band includes several former members of BoySetsFire, Gray informed fans that it would not be another political band.

Drummer Matt Krupanski went on to form new bands Bound and Buried and Young Lady, the latter which included future BoySetsFire bassist, Marc Krupanski (formerly of Dear Tonight, Midvale, Eldritch Anisette, Dorian Gray, and Network 34), as well as two other Delaware natives, including members from Joshua Fit for Battle.

=== Reunion ===
BoySetsFire announced their reunion on their website and official Facebook page on October 5, 2010. Tour venues were Berlin, the Groezrock Festival in Belgium, the Studio at Webster Hall and the Nova Rock Festival in Nickelsdorf, Austria. In August 2011, they played in the UK at the Reading & Leeds Festival. In November 2011, via the band's official Facebook page, the band announced Robert Ehrenbrand had left the band. The band then announced that Marc Krupanski officially joined as the new bassist.

The band recorded five new songs in the summer of 2012 with two of them scheduled to be released on Magic Bullet Records as a vinyl 7" record. In 2012, five shows were played in the U.S.: two in January 2012 (one in their hometown of Newark, Delaware and the other in West Chester, Pennsylvania), one in Boston, one in Providence, and one and at The Bamboozle Festival in Asbury Park, New Jersey in May 2012. They then conducted a three-week tour in July–August 2012 in Europe. In December 2012 via the band's official Facebook page, it was announced that both Matt and Marc Krupanski had left the band. A few days later, it was announced that Chris Rakus and Robert Ehrenbrand would share bass player duties. Dan Pelic joined as drummer.

In June 2013, the band released a two-song EP featuring brothers Matt and Marc Krupanski, as well as a fifth album, While a Nation Sleeps..., which featured new and previously unreleased songs re-recorded by Dan Pelic and Robert Ehrenbrand. It was well-received, especially in the German album charts, where it reached #22. A European Tour was carried out in June and July 2013, including concerts at Hurricane and Southside Festival, with additional shows being played in Dortmund, Stuttgart and Hamburg in October 2013. In November and December 2013, the band toured Australia and in April 2014 gave concerts in the UK. The band returned to Europe for summer and, in celebration of its 20th anniversary, announced shows in Hamburg, Cologne, Berlin and Vienna in October 2014.

In September 2015, the band released their self-titled sixth album. This was followed by a European tour to support the album with Silverstein and Great Collapse. In Summer 2016, they went on a European tour with Polar and Wolf Down before taking a break in order to focus on other musical projects.

Drummer and co-founder Matt Krupanski died on March 28, 2026.

== Influences and legacy ==
BoySetsFire have cited influences including Rites of Spring and the Revolution Summer movement, Fugazi, Born Against, Bad Religion, Merle Haggard, Foo Fighters, Jawbreaker, Samiam, Rage Against the Machine, A Perfect Circle, Tool, Portishead, Johnny Cash, Agnostic Front, Gorilla Biscuits, Christian Death, the Clash, Rick Springfield, Goo Goo Dolls, Soul Asylum and Dead Kennedys.

They have been cited as an influence by Keepsake, Strike Anywhere, Thursday, Story of the Year, Funeral for a Friend, Frank Turner and Trivium.

== Personnel ==
=== Current members ===
- Nat Gray – lead vocals, keyboards (1994–2007, 2010–present)
- Josh Latshaw – guitar, backing vocals (1994–2007, 2010–present)
- Chad Istvan – guitar, backing vocals (1994–2007, 2010–present)
- Robert Ehrenbrand – bass (2004–2007, 2010–2011, 2012–present)
- Jared Shavelson – drums (2013–present)

=== Former members ===
- Darrell Hyde – bass (1994–1999)
- Rob Avery – bass (1999–2004)
- Marc Krupanski – bass (2011–2012)
- Matt Krupanski – drums (1994–2007, 2010–2012; died 2026)
- Dan Pelic – drums (2012–2013)

== Discography ==
Over the years, BoySetsFire have released records through Magic Bullet, Conquer the World, Deathwish Inc, Initial, Hydra Head, Victory, Wind-up, Equal Vision and Burning Heart. They have released split-EPs with Coalesce, Shai Hulud, Snapcase, Funeral for a Friend, and KMPFSPRT.

=== Studio albums ===
- 1997: The Day the Sun Went Out
- 2000: After the Eulogy
- 2003: Tomorrow Come Today
- 2006: The Misery Index: Notes from the Plague Years
- 2013: While a Nation Sleeps...
- 2015: Boysetsfire

=== EPs ===
- 1994: Boysetsfire
- 1995: Premonition, Change, Revolt
- 1996: Consider
- 1996: This Crying, this Screaming, my Voice is being born
- 1998: In Chrysalis
- 1999: Snapcase vs. Boysetsfire (split)
- 2000: Crush 'Em All Vol. 1 (Boysetsfire/Shai Hulud split)
- 2000: Coalesce / Boysetsfire (split)
- 2001: Suckerpunch Training
- 2013: Bled dry
- 2013: The Casting-out
- 2014: Split 7" (Boysetsfire/Funeral for a Friend)
- 2015: Split 10" (Boysetsfire/KMPFSPRT)
- 2024: Digital Split (Boysetsfire/All Else Failed)

=== Compilations and other appearances ===
- 1995: Dad, I Can't Breathe(Creep Records compilation)
- 1997: For the Kids (7" benefit compilation, including an earlier version of BSF song "With Cold Eyes". Other bands include "The Weak Link Breaks", "By the Grace of God" and "Dorian Gray" which featured other Delaware natives including future members of Boysetsfire, Rob Avery and Marc Krupanski. Released by Diffusion Records)
- 2003: Daredevil: The Album (soundtrack to the original motion picture, LP)
- 2005: Before the Eulogy (B-sides and rarities CD)

One of their songs, "Handful of Redemption", is featured on the video games Tiger Woods '03 and MVP Baseball '03 by EA Sports. Their song "Rookie" from the After the Eulogy album was featured on the Legends of Wrestling video game. "Rookie" from After the Eulogy and "Handful of Redemption" from the Tomorrow Come Today album were also featured in the video games 1080° Avalanche, MVP Baseball 2003 and Tiger Woods PGA Tour 2003. Additionally, their song "High Wire Escape Artist" is featured on the soundtrack to The Daredevil motion picture. The soundtrack record, released by Wind-up Records, is the band's first and only gold record.

=== Live recordings ===
- 2002: Live for Today (EP)
- 2009: Farewell Show (DVD)

=== Music videos ===
- 2003: Last Year's Nest
- 2005: Dear George
- 2006: Requiem
- 2013: Bled Dry
- 2013: Closure
- 2013: Never Said
- 2015: One Match
