= In Tongues We Speak =

EP (split) by Napalm Death / Coalesce
- Released: 20 January 1997
- Genre: Deathgrind; metalcore
- Length: 12:15
- Label: Earache
- Producer: Napalm Death

Napalm Death / Coalesce chronology
Diatribes (1996)	In Tongues We Speak (1997)	Inside the Torn Apart (1997)

Professional ratings
Review scores
Source	Rating
Allmusic	link
Collector's Guide to Heavy Metal	7/10

In Tongues We Speak is a split EP album by English grindcore band Napalm Death and American metalcore band Coalesce.

== Track listing ==
No.	Title	Length
1.	"Food Chains" (Napalm Death)	3:14
2.	"A Safe Place" (Coalesce)	2:53
3.	"Upward and Uninterested" (demo version) (Napalm Death)	2:24
4.	"Harvest of Maturity" (Coalesce)	3:44

== Credits ==
Napalm Death

- Mark "Barney" Greenway – vocals
- Jesse Pintado – guitar
- Mitch Harris – guitar
- Shane Embury – bass
- Danny Herrera – drums

Coalesce

- Sean Ingram – vocals
- Jes Steineger – guitars
- Stacy Hilt – bass
- James Dewees – drums
