= The Appleseed Cast =

American emo band

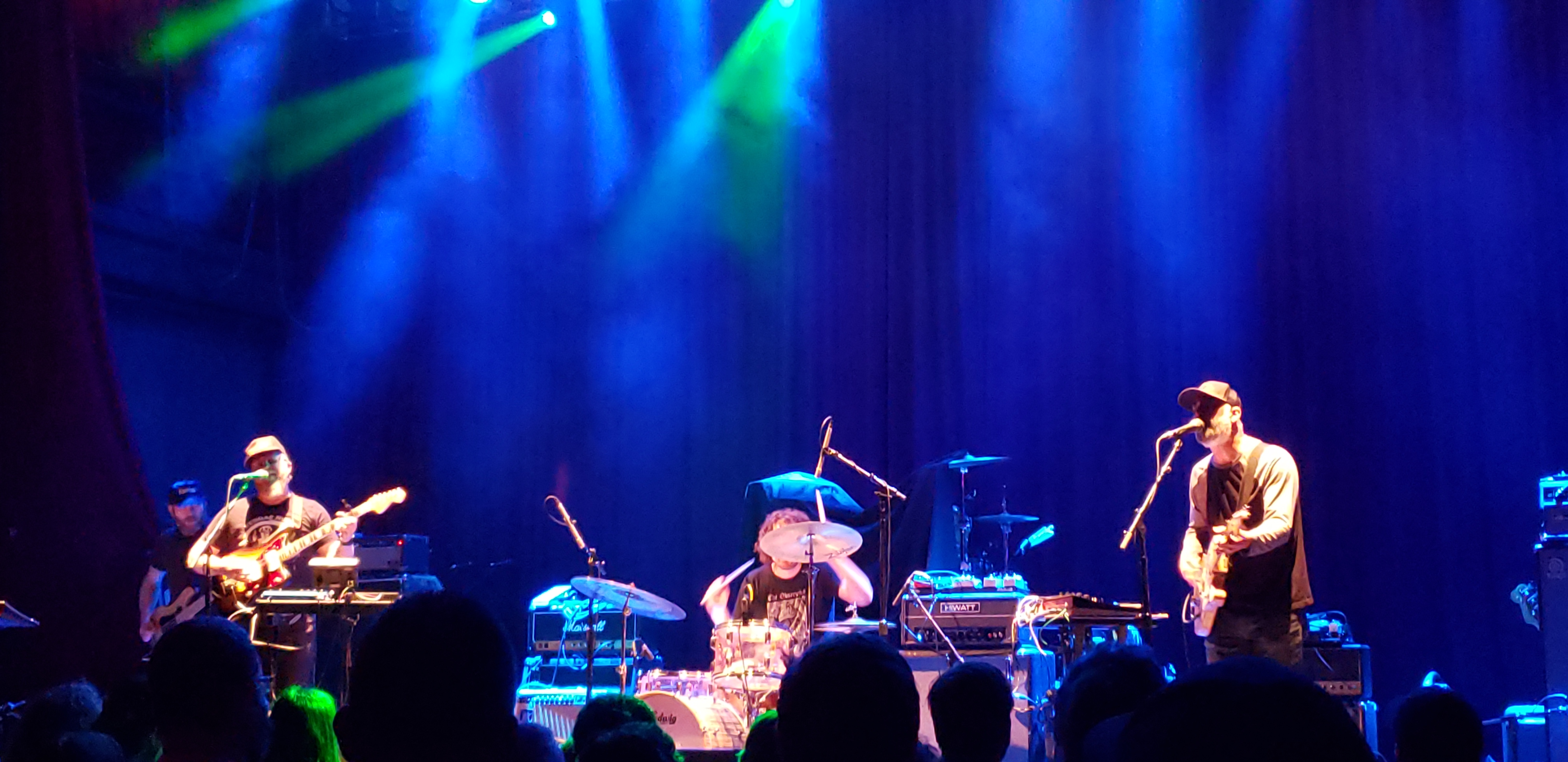
- At The Fillmore in Silver Spring, Maryland, 2022

Background information
- Origin: Lawrence, Kansas, U.S.
- Genres: Midwest emo; indie rock; post-rock
- Years active: 1997–present
- Labels: Deep Elm; Tiger Style; The Militia Group; Graveface; Vagrant
- Members: Christopher Crisci; Sean Bergman; Ben Kimball; Nick Fredrickson
- Past members: Louie Ruiz; Jason Wickersheim; Josh "Cobra" Baruth; Jordan Geiger; Nathan "Jr." Richardson; Aaron Coker; Garrett Marsh; Marc Young; Aaron Pillar; Nathan Whitman; Ted Stevens; John Momberg; Lucas Oswald; Taylor Holenbeck; Nathan Wilder

The Appleseed Cast is an American emo band from Lawrence, Kansas. It was founded in the early days of emo by singer-guitarist Christopher Crisci and drummer Louie Ruiz. The band has steadily evolved over the release of eight full-length albums, with Crisci serving as the main songwriter. It has a frequently rotating lineup, with Crisci being the only consistent member since the band's conception. Currently, the lineup includes Christopher Crisci, Ben Kimball, Nick Fredrickson and Sean Bergman.

Major acclaim first came in the early 2000s that earned them a 9.0 from Pitchfork for their album set Low Level Owl Vol I and Vol II. The band received further acclaim for their work on Two Conversations, Peregrine, Illumination Ritual, and others.

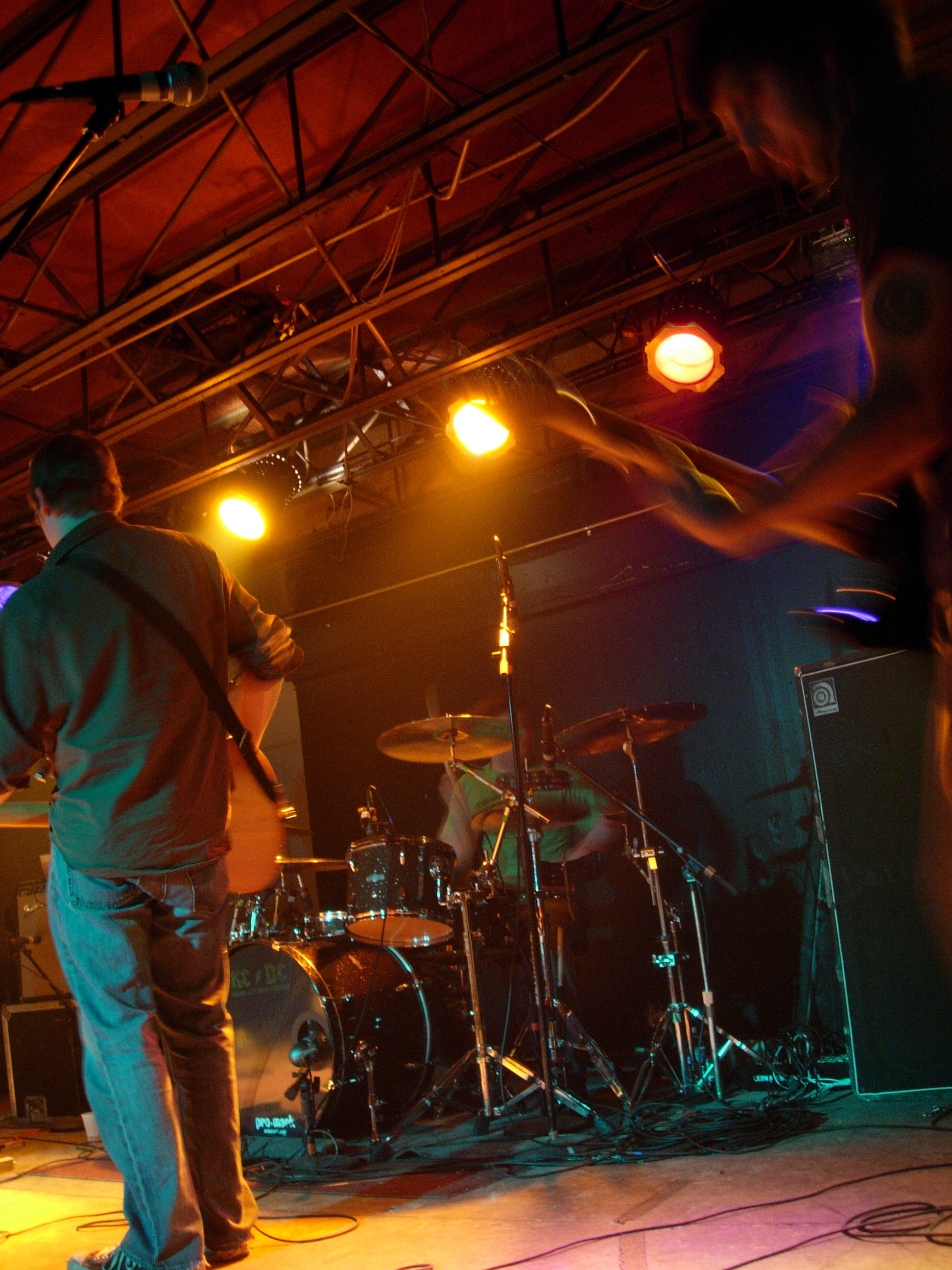
The Appleseed Cast performing in Silver Spring, Maryland, 2022

== History ==
=== Formation and The End of the Ring Wars ===
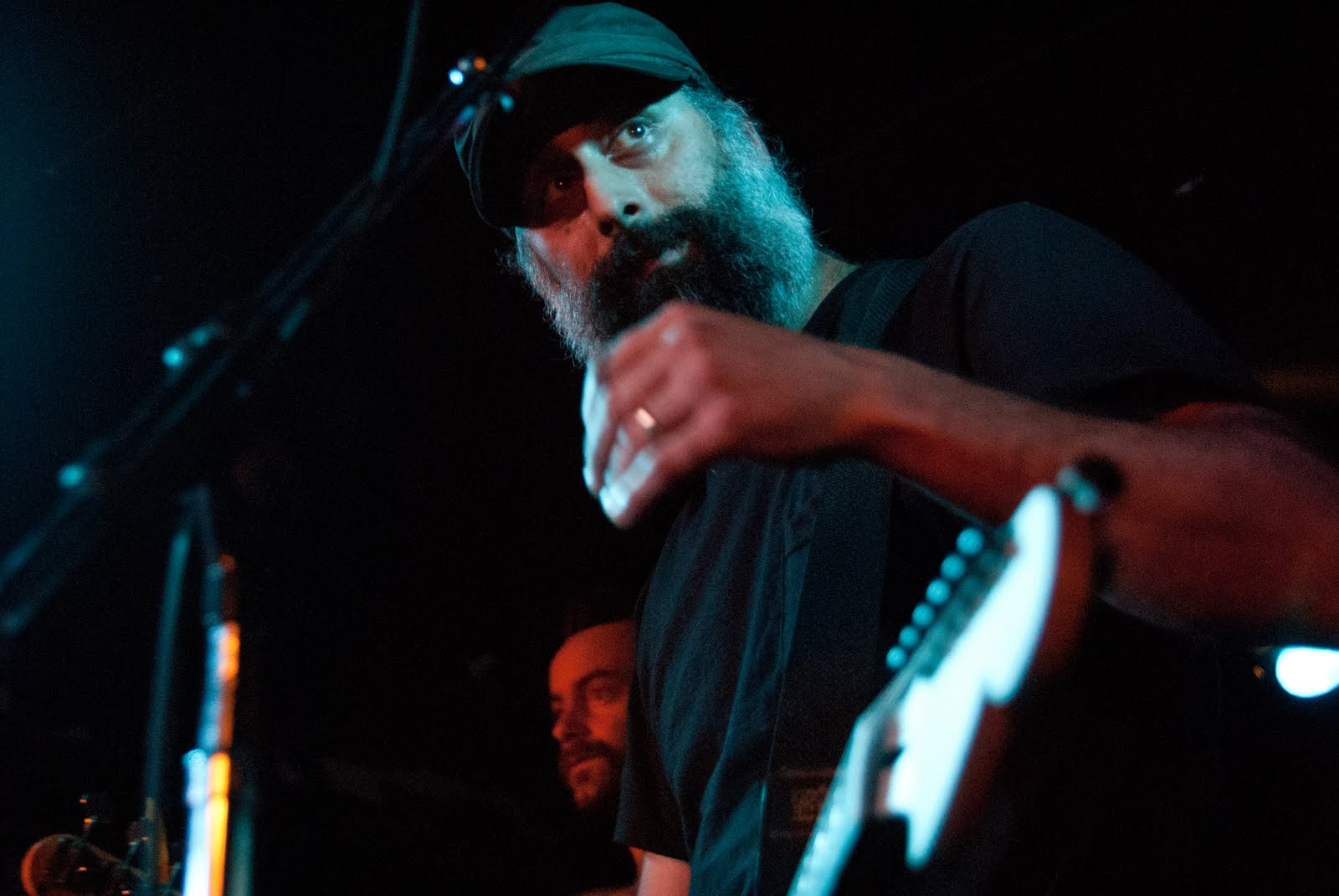
Lead vocalist Christopher Crisci

The band formed in 1997 in Southern California with Crisci and Aaron Pillar joining bassist Jason Wickersheim and drummer Louie Ruiz. The band was originally named December's Tragic Drive after a lyric from the song "Seven" by Sunny Day Real Estate, but according to Pillar, upon being told that this name would result in them being "pigeonholed for the rest of your life", the band opted to change it to Appleseed. Fearing a potential lawsuit from Gainax, the studio behind the OVA Appleseed, the band changed it once more to the Appleseed Cast.

In 1998, the band signed to Deep Elm Records out of New York before relocating to North Carolina, and released its debut album, The End of the Ring Wars. According to Pillar, The End of the Ring Wars was influenced by such bands as Braid, Rainer Maria and Broken Hearts Are Blue. Cristi has noted that his favorite album at the time was Broken Hearts Are Blue's The Truth About Love and that he "loved" Sunny Day Real Estate's Diary and especially LP2. The album earned comparisons to Sunny Day and Mineral, which led Crisci to seek a more original sound for the band, since he did not want to Appleseed Cast to be known as "the band that's good at copying another band."

=== Mare Vitalis ===
In 1999, Ruiz left the band, and Crisci moved back to San Diego while Pillar and Wickersheim moved to Los Angeles. After struggling for a few months to make the band work while living in different cities, the three remaining members decided to relocate to Wickersheim's hometown of Lawrence, Kansas, recruiting new drummer Josh "Cobra" Baruth soon after. Later that same year the group entered the Red House studio in Eudora, Kansas, with producer Ed Rose, who would go on to produce the next four Appleseed Cast records. The end result was Mare Vitalis, the band's second full-length album. The album showed progression from the dynamics-heavy rock of The End of the Ring Wars. The album was a concept album on the movements of the sea – encapsulated in such song titles as "Mare Mortis," "Poseidon" and "Kilgore Trout" (also an allusion to the recurring Kurt Vonnegut character of the same name) —, the album is loved by fans, heavy on atmosphere, crescendo, subtly undulating guitar arpeggios and the intricate drumming of Baruth, who clearly brought a new dimension to the band's sonic palette.

The band completed Mare Vitalis in late 1999, but tensions were developing between the band and Wickersheim. In January 2000, Pillar asked his roommate, St. Joseph, Missouri-native Marc Young, if he would be interested in playing bass one show for the band. Young agreed, though the show they spoke of and agreed upon never materialized. Regardless, Wickersheim officially departed the group that same month with Young replacing him on the bass. The Appleseed Cast toured Europe in October 1999, playing shows with Jimmy Eat World and the (International) Noise Conspiracy.

=== Low Level Owl and Lost Songs ===
After completing the Mare Vitalis tours, The Appleseed Cast returned to the studio in late 2000 to work on what would become their most ambitious project. Eager to fulfill their five-record deal with Deep Elm, the band embarked on a double LP, with Ed Rose once again recording. Low Level Owl Volume One was released on August 21, 2001, followed by Volume Two on October 23, 2001.

The tracks were woven together into a seamless album-length soundscape with a noticeable post-rock influence. The complex vocal arrangements and enigmatic lyrics were buried in the mix underneath simple, repeated guitar riffs, keyboards, found sounds and Baruth's intricate drum patterns. The non-instrumental pieces containing were connected by ambient-influenced instrumentals. Both Low Level Owl albums were a progression from the more song-oriented Mare Vitalis and a complete shock, the previously disparaging Pitchforkmedia website gave the albums a glowing review. Some critics were put off by the intentionally repetitive nature of the guitar playing and the ambient instrumental interludes.

The following year, the band followed Low Level Owl with the release of Lost Songs, a collection of songs that had been largely recorded in 1999 with some parts added later on by Crisci, as a way of satisfying fans who preferred their earlier sound. Lost Songs would be their final release on Deep Elm.

=== Two Conversations ===
The Appleseed Cast signed with the New York-based indie label Tiger Style Records in 2003 and released Two Conversations shortly afterward. Touring keyboardist Jordan Geiger was officially credited as a band member on the album. Two Conversations was met with mixed reviews.

Some viewed the album with dismay, regarding the more conventional song structures, the less diverse sonic palette and the personal, relationship-driven lyrics as a blatant retreat after the no-holds-barred experimentation, depth and complexity of Low Level Owl. However, others saw the album as an assured combination of the driving emo-rock of their early work subtly embellished with elements of Low Level Owl's sound.

During the recording of the album and the subsequent tour, tensions mounted once again. Rumors began to surface in the spring of 2004 that drummer Baruth was no longer a part of the group and were confirmed on the band's website later that year.

Following the confirmation, the band went on hiatus. Crisci began working with his folk-influenced side project Old Canes and Geiger returned to his band Minus Story. In the meantime Tiger Style Records faced financial difficulties and dropped their entire roster, including The Appleseed Cast after just one album.

=== Rebirth and Peregrine ===
Throughout late 2004 and much of 2005, little was heard on the band's situation. This began to change later in the year as news of drummer auditions began to spread. The band auditioned with many drummers including part-time Old Canes drummer Aaron Coker who later went on to tour with Reggie & The Full Effect. The position eventually went to The Casket Lottery drummer, Nathan "Nate Jr." Richardson.

With a new drummer in place, the band was signed by the Militia Group in 2005 and announced they were returning to the studio in October.

The recording sessions for Peregrine, The Appleseed Cast's sixth full-length album, were held in Cannon Falls, Minnesota, at Pachyderm Studio. The sessions were produced by John Congleton.

Crisci stated on the band's website "...I don't know if I've felt better about a record this early since Mare Vitalis." The album is arguably more eclectic than any previous release in the band's catalogue, the Low Level Owl indebted instrumental "An Orange and a Blue" sitting alongside the more conventional, guitar-driven "February" and the stark, electronica of "Mountain Halo."

Peregrine was released on March 21, 2006.

Richardson left the band in the early summer of 2006 and was replaced by Coker.

=== Sagarmatha ===
When asked about the next album (previously discussed as an entirely instrumental EP) in an interview, Crisci had said, "...the idea is still there, although it has morphed into a mostly instrumental full length.". Pillar has stated that the recording process lasted approximately nine months and half the album was done at the band's home studio the Toy Shop.

Recording sessions were held at Black Lodge Recording in Eudora, Kansas, with Ed Rose after unsuccessful attempts to arrange John Congleton to helm the recording. Three demos, "Road West", "A Bright Light" and "Summer Before", were released as previews on the band's Myspace. Prior to the album's release, Coker left the band and Young followed shortly thereafter in order to return to school. They were replaced by John Momberg and Nate Whitman, respectively. Sagarmatha was released on February 17, 2009, and reached No. 25 on the Billboard Heatseekers chart.

=== Low Level Owl Live and documentary ===
On November 23, 2009, it was announced that the group has signed to Graveface Records. On the same day, the site announced that The Appleseed Cast would be touring with labelmates Dreamend in spring 2010, "playing their two classic albums, Low Level Owl Volume I and II back-to-back, each in its entirety". The announcement also mentioned that the band would have a live album for sale on the tour. The band was to be the subject of a documentary to be produced by 7446 films in cooperation with Graveface Records. The film will document the band revisiting its seminal work, while also focusing on the creation of Low Level Owl Volume I and II and the journey the band has taken to this point. The film was scheduled for a 2012 release.

=== Middle States EP and Illumination Ritual ===
In July 2010, Momberg posted on the band's Myspace page that they were working on new material. On February 26, 2011, Graveface Records uploaded a video to YouTube containing a sound clip from the demo of the title track for Middle States. In the video description, they announced that Middle States would be released on June 7, 2011.

As of May 2012, The Appleseed Cast had begun working on recording another full-length album. They posted demos from their upcoming album to Bandcamp. Illumination Ritual was released on April 23, 2013.

=== The Fleeting Light of Impermanence and current news ===
The Appleseed Cast supported Caspian on a North American tour that ran from October 22 to November 19, 2016.

In January 2019, they announced they were working on a new album and released a new song, "Asking the Fire for Medicine". The Fleeting Light of Impermanence was released on June 28, 2019, on Graveface Records; the single "Time the Destroyer" was simultaneously released on Bandcamp.

In Fall 2022 and Spring 2023, the band went on two tours opening for Sunny Day Real Estate.

== Musical style and influences ==
Ryan De Freitas of Kerrang! said that the band's debut album The End of the Ring Wars "encapsulates the brilliance of early emo better than any other." He explained, "Emo in the '90s was about scrappy, emotionally fuelled imperfection and Ring Wars is the absolute peak of that. The lyrics are earnest, the songwriting is brilliant, and the production is a bit of a fucking mess. It’s everything that emo’s golden age was, and didn’t try to be anything that it wasn’t."

Though their initial sound was heavily indebted to such bands as Braid and Rainer Maria, founding member Aaron Pillar was influenced by Depeche Mode and OMD, and both he and Chris Crisci shared an interest in Led Zeppelin and U2. Crisci has also cited the Cure, Echo & the Bunnymen, Love and Rockets, Depeche Mode, Bad Brains, Bob Dylan, and Leonard Cohen as influences.

== Discography ==
=== Studio albums ===
- The End of the Ring Wars (Deep Elm, 1998)
- Mare Vitalis (Deep Elm, 2000)
- Low Level Owl: Volume I (Deep Elm, 2001)
- Low Level Owl: Volume II (Deep Elm, 2001)
- Two Conversations (Tiger Style, 2003)
- Peregrine (The Militia Group, 2006)
- Sagarmatha (The Militia Group, 2009)
- Illumination Ritual (Graveface, 2013)
- The Fleeting Light of Impermanence (Graveface, 2019)

=== Singles and EPs ===
- Tale of the Aftermath b/w Skatter Ik Ignito 7" (1998)
- Split (with Planes Mistaken for Stars and Race Car Riot, Deep Elm Records, 1999)
- Lost Songs (Deep Elm Records, 2002)
- Middle States (Graveface Records, 2011)

=== Compilations ===
- A Million Miles Away - The Emo Diaries No. 2 (Deep Elm Records, 1998) - Max
- Deep Elm Unreleased No. 2 (Deep Elm Records, 2003) - The Spider Wall
- Emo Is Awesome / Emo Is Evil 1 (Deep Elm Records, 2003) - Reaction, Forever Longing Golden Sunsets
- Emo Is Awesome / Emo Is Evil 2 (Deep Elm Records, 2004) - Marigold & Patchwork
- Kumquats and Apricots (The Militia Group, 2006) - Here We Are (Family in the Hallway), Mountain Halo
- Graveface Sampler (Graveface Records, 2007) - Sila's Knife
