= Ed Rose =

- Born: February 23, 1970 (age 56)
- Genres: Emo, alternative, pop punk, hardcore punk
- Occupation: Record producer
- Years active: 1991–present

Ed Rose is an American sound engineer and record producer. He has worked extensively with groups in the modern emo and pop punk scenes. He also co-owns Black Lodge Recording with Rob Pope and his brother Ryan Pope, members of the emo band the Get Up Kids.

== History ==
Rose held an interest in sound recording in his high school years, which was nurtured by his family. One year he got a Fostex X-15 recorder for Christmas. The next year he moved up to a Fostex 250, which he still uses. His interest in sound recording continued to grow, and he decided to attend the Full Sail Center for the Recording Arts. He interned at Studio 55 in Los Angeles. After an ownership change, he left Studio 55 and tried freelancing for six months. However, he found himself doing more technical setup than engineering, so he moved to Lawrence, Kansas, in 1991 to attend the University of Kansas to get a degree in electrical engineering. He was soon approached by a friend who asked him to record a demo for his band. They recorded at Redhouse Recording. He enjoyed working there, so the owners offered him a job. His first session recording was with a local band called Slackjaw. The members of the band took a liking to Rose, so they began spreading the word and helping him get work. A year later, he dropped out from school and became a full-time partner in the studio.

He has worked in New Zealand, Japan, and Australia (where he recorded Heartbreak Club).

=== Black Lodge Studios ===
In 2003, Rose with the help of all the members of the Get Up Kids renovated the old Redhouse Recording studio to create Black Lodge Studios. The studios, named in reference to David Lynch's television show Twin Peaks, is located in Eudora, Kansas.

The building itself was entirely renovated, and all the old recording equipment was replaced with new, top-of-the-line equipment. The Get Up Kids' studio album Guilt Show was the first album to be recorded there, and since then the studio has thrived, having been the studio used for the albums I Am the Movie by Motion City Soundtrack, Killed or Cured by the New Amsterdams, and A Collection of Short Stories by Houston Calls.

The studio also holds several recording workshops during the course of a year, allowing producing hopefuls to earn hands-on experience with real equipment in a real studio setting. Both local and signed acts record at Black Lodge.

On December 6, 2012, Rose announced he will be no longer making records after the 2013 calendar year. The Black Lodge Studios is up for sale.

== Producer credits ==
Artist	Albums
The Appleseed Cast	Mare Vitalis; Low Level Owl, Vol. 1; Low Level Owl, Vol. 2; Two Conversations
Blackpool Lights	This Town's Disaster
Boys Life	"Temporary"; "Crank"
Burn It Down	Let the Dead Bury the Dead
The Casket Lottery	Choose Bronze; Moving Mountains; Survival is for Cowards; Possibilities and Maybes; Smoke and Mirrors
Caterpillars	Self Titled EP; The Other Side
Coalesce	002; Give Them Rope; Functioning on Impatience; There is Nothing New Under the Sun; 0:12 Revolution in Just Listening; Salt and Passage
Emery	The Weak's End
The Esoteric	With the Sureness of Sleepwalking
The Get Up Kids	Woodson; Eudora; Guilt Show; There Are Rules
Houston Calls	A Collection of Short Stories
Limbeck	This Chapter Is Called Titles; Hi, Everything's Great.; Limbeck
Motion City Soundtrack	I Am the Movie
The New Amsterdams	Worse for the Wear
Philmont	Photosynthetic
Puddle of Mudd	Stuck
Reggie and the Full Effect	Greatest Hits 1984-1987; Promotional Copy; Under the Tray; Songs Not to Get Married To; No Country For Old Musicians
Small Brown Bike	Dead Reckoning
Small Towns Burn A Little Slower	Mortality as Home Entertainment
The Spill Canvas	One Fell Swoop
Spitalfield	Stop Doing Bad Things
Ultimate Fakebook	Electric Kissing Parties; This Will Be Laughing Week; Open Up and Say... Awesome; Before We Spark
Vedera	The Weight of an Empty Room
White Whale	White Whale

A complete list of Ed Rose's Production and Engineering credits can be found at www.edrose.com
