= Coalesce (band) =

American metalcore band

- Origin: Kansas City, Missouri, U.S.
- Genres: Metalcore, mathcore
- Years active: 1994–1999; 2002; 2005–2010; 2011; 2012; 2024–2026
- Labels: Edison; Earache; Relapse; Second Nature
- Members: Sean Ingram; Nathan Ellis; Jeff Gensterblum
- Past members: Jes Steineger; Jim Redd; Stacy Hilt; James Dewees; Cory White; Nathan Richardson

Coalesce is an American metalcore band formed in Kansas City, Missouri, in 1994. They are considered pioneers of mathcore and were known for its aggressive style of music and reckless live shows. The band broke up in 2010 and has performed several reunion shows since then.

== History ==
=== Formation and early years (1994–1996) ===
Before forming Coalesce, guitarist Jes Steineger and bassist Stacy Hilt were members of the Krishnacore band Amara, Jim Redd was the drummer of the alternative metal band Loathe, and Sean Ingram was the frontman of the straight edge band Restrain, all from Kansas City, Missouri. Both Amara and Restrain performed several times together and were friends. Ingram, who was a big fan of Earth Crisis and the burgeoning vegan straight edge scene, relocated to Syracuse, New York on Christmas Day, 1993. For their part, Steineger and Hilt wanted to establish a new band and had numerous attempts looking for a drummer, and after locating Jim Redd during a show, they were impressed by his musical ability and together formed Breach in January 1994. Disillusioned by the militant attitude of the Syracuse scene, Ingram went back to Kansas around Easter 1994 and almost immediately auditioned for Breach, writing the lyrics for "Harvest of Maturity" and being accepted to join them. The band changed their name to Coalesce to avoid confusion with a Swedish band of the same name.

The U.K. division of Earache Records was impressed by Coalesce's demo and invited them to record an EP for Earache's 7-inch series imprint, New Chapter. The EP, titled 002, was recorded in one day and released in 1995. 002 marked the beginning of Coalesce's relationship with Red House Studios and producer Ed Rose, who would record all of Coalesce's following material.

In the summer of 1995, Coalesce embarked on their first U.S. tour to promote 002. They supported the bands Bloodlet and 108. The tour served as a cause of Coalesce's first break-up, as the clashing of personalities had amplified between vocalist Sean Ingram and drummer Jim Redd while on the road. Once Coalesce returned home from the road, Redd convinced the other bandmates to oust Ingram from the band. Sean showed up at band practice to find that James Dewees was auditioning for vocalist. Ingram engaged in a confrontation with drummer Redd, resulting in Coalesce disbanding altogether in March 1996.

In July 1996, guitarist Jes Steineger called Ingram and the two decided to reform the band. Stacy Hilt was included as bassist in the reunion, and included James Dewees as drummer, the same person who had attempted to secure the available vocalist position before Coalesce had broken up; drummer Jim Redd decided not to rejoin the band again because he was attending the University of Maryland in Baltimore, Maryland. This incarnation of the band dusted off some older material and revised it so they could release it on the records A Safe Place 7-inch on Edison Recordings and the Earache-distributed split EP with grind veterans Napalm Death, entitled In Tongues We Speak.

=== Give Them Rope and Functioning on Impatience (1997–1998) ===
In 1997, Coalesce wrote and recorded their first full length, Give Them Rope (released on Edison Recordings), as well as songs for several compilations and split 7-inch records with The Get Up Kids, Today is the Day, and Converge. After weeks of performing new material on tour, including a violent show in Wilkes-Barre, Pennsylvania, the work began on what would become Functioning on Impatience, but Stacy Hilt's increasing exhaustion due to their aggressive performances led to him quitting the band. After Hilt left the band he was replaced by Nathan Ellis, a guitarist willing to switch to the bass to join one of his favorite bands. Coalesce entered Red House Studios in the spring of 1998 to record the album Functioning on Impatience in three days. Shortly after, Coalesce recorded songs for a split 7-inch with Boy Sets Fire. Both the full-length and the split record were released that summer.

Coalesce again entered Red House to record There is Nothing New Under the Sun, a one-off release on Hydra Head of Led Zeppelin covers, which was released in late 1998. Coalesce attempted a US tour in support of this record, managing to play the east coast dates with Neurosis, Nile and The Dillinger Escape Plan, but the tour ended abruptly as unresolvable problems with their touring van brought tensions to a head and rendered Coalesce unable to complete the tour. They discarded the van, returned home in a U-Haul and subsequently disbanded once more.

=== 0:12 Revolution in Just Listening, hiatus and return to touring (1999–2004) ===
After Steineger stopped being part of the Hare Krishna movement, Coalesce was offered to work with the Christian label Solid State Records, but they ultimately declined it because of their volatile nature. Afterward, they signed with Relapse Records and the members recorded their next album, 0:12 Revolution in Just Listening, in separate sessions from each other. Dan Henk provided cover art for their first semi-major label release. A lineup impervious to breaking up was something that would always elude Coalesce. The usual cause for a Coalesce breakup was either standard in house feuding between band members, lack of money, or intermittent bouts of leaving and rejoining Coalesce due to religious reasons. Coalesce reformed in 2002 sans Jes Steineger, replacing him with The Esoteric guitarist, Cory White, for a national tour and short recordings.

=== Ox and second hiatus (2005–present) ===
In August 2005, Coalesce was scheduled to play Hellfest in Trenton, New Jersey, with original guitarist Jes Steineger and a new drummer, Nathan Richardson, but legal problems prevented the festival from taking place. Having already made travel arrangements, the band performed shows at two smaller venues in Philadelphia and in the Wilkes-Barre area.

The band played what they advertised as their 'final show' in Lawrence, Kansas in September 2005. During the Philadelphia and Lawrence reunion shows lead singer Sean Ingram announced that the band was going to begin writing new music under a new moniker, but this idea was abandoned.

On January 3, 2007, lead singer Sean Ingram announced on his personal blog website that Coalesce had recorded 2 new songs on December 28 and 29 at Black Lodge Studios. The songs would be on an upcoming final 7-inch to be self-released by the band along with a DVD and book in 2007.

On February 9, 2007, Coalesce announced, via MySpace, that they intended to do some touring in August 2007. Possible areas included Europe, Japan and the United States (East Coast).

On March 21, 2007, Ingram announced on the Coalesce website that the release would be titled Salt and Passage. The tracks would be titled "Son of Son of Man" and "I Am This". It was also said that re-recording of the vocal tracks for There is Nothing New Under the Sun were completed for the re-release through Hydra Head Records.

On May 26, 2007, on the official website announcements were made in regards to the upcoming 7-inch and DVD. Instead of releasing them together they would be released separately. The 7-inch to be released in a hand screened gatefold cover with limited different colors on September 11, 2007. The DVD will be a collection of as many complete shows that they could get and it is entitled No Business in this Business. The DVD was released in late August to early September.

Coalesce's latest full-length record Ox features 14 songs and was released on June 9, 2009 (North America) and June 15 (international) on Relapse Records. The band has completed a two-week headlining tour of Europe in support of Ox. Furthermore, the band has released a follow-up EP titled OXEP that features seven songs and was released November 10.

On June 18, 2010, Coalesce announced they would be taking a break from making music to focus on their personal lives.

Coalesce reunited for a performance at Krazy Fest 2011 in Louisville, Kentucky in May 2011.

On October 20, 2012, Coalesce played with Converge, Torche and Kvelertak at Granada Theatre in Lawrence, Kansas.

On February 14, 2024, it was announced the band would reunite for the first time in 12 years to play the 2024 Furnace Fest in October. On September 7th, the band performed an opening set for the band Chat Pile in Lawrence.

On January 6, 2026, it was announced that the band had parted ways with Jes Steineger due to allegations of him conducting an inappropriate relationship with a 24-year-old student while he was in his mid 40s and serving as her professor. Additionally, their slated appearance in the upcoming 2026 edition of the Roadburn Festival in Europe has since been cancelled as a result, throwing the future of the band into question and possibly signaling the band entering into another hiatus.

== Artistry ==
=== Musical style ===
"Coalesce was at once pushing beyond what was acceptable to play in hardcore and beyond what was acceptable to talk about in hardcore. This is hardcore as I've come to understand it. It is the strenuous effort to be heard, not because one's viewpoint is exalted, but because no viewpoints should be exalted."

— Biopsy, 2013

Coalesce's music is characterized by odd time signatures, abrasive vocals, sudden changes and angular-dissonant guitars. Usually, they also include free-form noise sections, and drastically different guitar and bass parts performed all together. They are often described as mathcore and original metalcore, before that term was co-opted by bands who both sang and screamed. Most of Coalesce instrumentals and creative direction were started by Jes Steineger, while Sean Ingram wrote all the lyrics and song titles.

Coalesce' style originated after Steineger was startled by the technical proficiency of drummer Jim Redd during their first rehearsal, which got him "so scared and finally concluded that now was the time to step up". Through jam sessions, they challenged each other to write heavier and more complex music, with Redd later stating that he wanted the band to be "Tool... heavy guitars, heavy drums, wacky time signatures, and loud/quiet dynamics", but "with none of the quiet parts". Among the band's initial influences were Jesus Lizard and Tortoise. Other main inspirations included Ritual Device, Pantera, Fugazi, Crawlpappy, Helmet and Dazzling Killmen.

While their early work drew mainly on chromatic scales and disjointed structures, they began incorporating pentatonic scales and 1970s hard rock grooves since their 1999 cover album There is Nothing New Under the Sun. On 2009's Ox and OXEP, Steineger and Nathan Ellis were immersed in Americana music and Spaghetti Western films, and, while maintaining their original style, they included more between-song dynamics, clean singing and yowls. For these albums they acknowledged, among others, Gillian Welch, Nickel Creek, Bill Monroe, the Stanley Brothers and Stevie Ray Vaughan as influences, as well as the soundtracks of O Brother, Where Art Thou? and Deadwood.

=== Vocals and lyrics ===
Vocalist Sean Ingram's original style consisted in high-pitched throat screaming. During their first tours, he learned to use his diaphragm to produce a lower and more powerful vocal delivery, which he started recording since the split EP In Tongues We Speak.

Ingram's lyrics deal with complicated family and intimate relationships, his experiences with death, tragic news stories and cynicism towards the straight edge, hardline and Hare Krishna ideologies which were prominent at the time. These are usually written from the perspective of an essayist rather than a diarist or poet. Although the lyrics were initially about his own life and disillusionments, the 1990s hardcore punk scene was highly politicized and some people felt personally attacked, especially members of the militant straight edge branches who even sent death threats to him and the band.

In 2000, Ingram cited Phil Anselmo and Karl Buechner as his biggest vocal influences, and Lisa Loeb and Maynard James Keenan as the lyrical ones. After their 2005 reunion, he acknowledged Sufjan Stevens' personal approach to songwriting as his main inspiration.

== Live performances ==
Coalesce's live performances were known for their dangerous and volatile nature. The band destroyed their gear and typically ended their shows throwing it all over the stage, and when fights broke out they kept playing. During Coalesce's first tours, Steineger and Hilt played with Hindu clothes. The former had the most erratic behaviors, thrusting his guitar without a pick to play it. Some attendants, especially straight edge people, tried to attack and start arguments with the band members because of their lyrics, particularly with Ingram.

== Legacy ==
Coalesce is often considered a pioneer of mathcore and one of the genre's most influential bands. Many artists have cited Coalesce as an influence or have expressed their admiration for them, including Norma Jean, Josh Scogin, Every Time I Die, Frank Iero of My Chemical Romance, Ben Weinman of The Dillinger Escape Plan, Tim McIlrath of Rise Against, Cult of Luna, James Hart of Eighteen Visions, Don Clark of Demon Hunter and Training for Utopia, The Ocean, Greg Kubacki of Car Bomb, Knut, Rob Fusco of Most Precious Blood, War from a Harlots Mouth, Chris Tzompanakis of Skycamefalling and Curran Reynolds of Today Is the Day.

== Band members ==
Current lineup

- Sean Ingram – vocals (1994–1999, 2002, 2005–2010, 2011, 2012, 2024–present)
- Nathan Ellis – bass (1998–1999, 2005–2010, 2011, 2012, 2024–present)
- Jeff Gensterblum – drums (2024–present)

Former members

- Jes Steineger – guitar (1994–1999, 2005–2010, 2011, 2012, 2024–2026)
- Stacy Hilt – bass (1994–1998, 2002)
- Jim Redd – drums (1994–1995)
- James Dewees – drums (1996–2002)
- Cory White – touring guitarist (2002)
- Nathan "Jr." Richardson – drums (2005–2010, 2011, 2012)

Timeline

== Discography ==
=== Studio albums ===
- 1997: Give Them Rope
- 1998: Functioning on Impatience
- 1999: 0:12 Revolution in Just Listening
- 2009: Ox

== Side projects ==
- James Dewees was the keyboard player for The Get Up Kids and My Chemical Romance and also performs in his solo project, Reggie and the Full Effect. He has also performed as the touring keyboard player for New Found Glory.
- Stacy Hilt and Nate Ellis play together in the band The Casket Lottery, Stacy playing bass and Nate playing guitar.
- Sean Ingram stood in for departed Dillinger Escape Plan vocalist Dimitri Minakakis and played Krazy Fest 4 with the band on July 28, 2001.
- Coalesce have recorded material for Earache Records, Edison Recordings, Hydra Head Records, Relapse Records and Second Nature Recordings.
