= Low Level Owl: Volume I =

Studio album by The Appleseed Cast
- Released: August 21, 2001
- Genre: Post rock, indie rock, emo
- Length: 53:08
- Label: Deep Elm
- Producer: Ed Rose, The Appleseed Cast

The Appleseed Cast chronology
Mare Vitalis (2000)	Low Level Owl: Volume I (2001)	Low Level Owl: Volume II (2001)

Professional ratings
Review scores
Source	Rating
Allmusic	link
Pitchfork Media	9/10 link
Sputnikmusic	3.5/5

Low Level Owl: Volume I is the third full-length album release from Lawrence, Kansas-based band the Appleseed Cast.

Vulture.com listed "On Reflection" as number 84 of the 100 greatest emo songs.

== Track listing ==
All music is composed by The Appleseed Cast.

No.	Title	Lyrics	Length
1.	"The Waking of Pertelotte"	instrumental	2:02
2.	"On Reflection"	Chris Crisci	6:26
3.	"Blind Man's Arrow"	Crisci	3:38
4.	"Flowers Falling from Dying Hands"	instrumental	3:28
5.	"Messenger"	instrumental	0:46
6.	"Doors Lead to Questions"	Crisci	2:53
7.	"Steps and Numbers"	Crisci, Aaron Pillar	5:54
8.	"Sentence"	Crisci	2:57
9.	"Bird of Paradise"	instrumental	2:24
10.	"Mile Marker"	Crisci, Pillar	4:02
11.	"Convict"	Crisci	6:02
12.	"A Tree for Trials"	Pillar	1:28
13.	"Signal"	Crisci	3:11
14.	"View of a Burning City"	instrumental	7:52

== Personnel ==
The Appleseed Cast

- Christopher Crisci – electric guitar (tracks 1, 2, 4, 6, 7, 8, 10, 13), acoustic guitar (track 1), xylophone (track 1), vocals (tracks 2, 3, 7, 8, 10, 11, 13), Fender Rhodes electric piano (tracks 2, 5, 11), piano (tracks 4, 6, 11), organ (tracks 6, 7, 11, 12), slide guitar (track 14)
- Aaron Pillar – electric guitar (tracks 1–3, 7, 10, 13, 14), acoustic guitar (tracks 3, 12), guitar loop (track 4), vocals (track 12)
- Marc Young – bass (track 2, 3, 7, 10, 13, 14)
- Josh "Cobra" Baruth – drums (track 2, 3, 6, 7, 10, 13, 14), sleigh bells (tracks 3, 10), percussion (track 7), Fender Rhodes electric piano (track 9), tambourine (track 10), wood block (track 10)

Additional personnel

- Ed Rose – electro strings (track 2), organ (track 3), Fender Rhodes electric piano (track 3), synthesizer (track 7), bass (track 8), sandpaper (track 11), engineer, recording, co-producer
- Mark Schwartz – mastering
- John Szuch – layout, design
