= Low Level Owl: Volume II =

Studio album by The Appleseed Cast
- Released: October 23, 2001
- Recorded: October–December 2000
- Genre: Post-rock, indie rock, emo
- Length: 55:28
- Label: Deep Elm
- Producer: Ed Rose, Appleseed Cast

The Appleseed Cast chronology
Low Level Owl: Volume I (2001)	Low Level Owl: Volume II (2001)	Lost Songs (2002)

Professional ratings
Review scores
Source	Rating
Allmusic	link
Pitchfork Media	9.0/10 link

Low Level Owl: Volume II is the fourth studio album by the Appleseed Cast, released two months after Low Level Owl: Volume I.

The albums met with a considerable degree of acclaim, and the band found themselves saddled with the term "America's closest answer to Radiohead".

== Track listing ==
All music is composed by The Appleseed Cast.

No.	Title	Lyrics	Length
1.	"View of a Burning City"	instrumental	1:27
2.	"Strings"	Chris Crisci	5:09
3.	"A Place in Line"	Crisci, Aaron Pillar	4:01
4.	"Shaking Hands"	Crisci	1:59
5.	"Rooms and Gardens"	Crisci, Pillar	7:34
6.	"Ring Out the Warning Bell"	instrumental	5:59
7.	"Sunset Drama King"	instrumental	6:07
8.	"The Last in a Line"	instrumental	4:13
9.	"Decline"	Pillar	1:03
10.	"The Argument"	instrumental	5:51
11.	"Reaction"	Crisci, Pillar	2:26
12.	"Confession"	instrumental	9:21

== Personnel ==
The Appleseed Cast

- Christopher Crisci — slide guitar (1), guitar (2, 3, 5–12), vocals (2–5, 11), organ (2, 4, 8), drum programming (6), piano (12), loops (8, 12), layout, design
- Aaron Pillar — guitar (1–5, 7, 9–12), piano (6, 7), vocals (9), loops (12)
- Marc Young — bass (1–3, 5, 7, 9–11)
- Josh "Cobra" Baruth — drums (1–3, 5, 7, 9–11), Fender Rhodes electric piano (11)

Additional personnel

- Ed Rose — bass (6), synth strings (7), drum machine (12), engineer, recording, co-producer
- Mark Schwartz – mastering
- John Szuch – layout, design
