= Mathcore =

Rhythmically complex and dissonant style of metal and punk

- Other names: Noisecore (early)
- Stylistic origins: Metalcore; hardcore punk; math rock; post-hardcore; noise rock; progressive metal; grindcore; experimental metal
- Cultural origins: 1990s, United States
- Derivative forms: White belt grind

Other topics
- Jazz metal; jazzcore; noise rock; progressive metal; progressive metalcore; technical death metal; screamo; sass

Mathcore is a subgenre of hardcore punk and metalcore that developed during the 1990s, influenced by post-hardcore, extreme metal and math rock. The genre features complex and variable rhythms with songs featuring irregular time signatures, polymeters, syncopations and tempo changes. Bands such as Converge, Botch, Coalesce and the Dillinger Escape Plan helped to establish the genre.

== Characteristics ==
Mathcore has been referred to as the "nerdy fusion cousin" of metalcore by Ultimate Guitar. According to the staff of Metal Hammer, the genre is akin to "the sound of metal being twisted into startling new shapes." but Loudwire stated that the genre is "almost indistinguishable from progressive metal."

=== Instrumentation ===
Mathcore typically features irregular time signatures, polymeters, syncopations and tempo changes, while retaining the intensity of hardcore. In the words of The Dillinger Escape Plan bassist Liam Wilson, their "choppy rhythms that people get kind of tongue-twisted on" are "Latin rhythms" mixed with the speed and "stamina" of heavy metal, drawing a parallel between them and John McLaughlin's use of Eastern sounds within a jazz context. Most pioneering mathcore drummers had jazz, orchestral or academic backgrounds, including Dazzling Killmen's Blake Fleming, Craw's Neil Chastain, Coalesce's James Dewees, Botch's Tim Latona, The Dillinger Escape Plan's Chris Pennie, and Converge's Ben Koller. As with the rhythm section, the guitars perform riffs that constantly change and are seldom repeated after one section. Early bands were almost completely atonal with the guitars or all the instruments playing polyphonic dissonance. After the first The Dillinger Escape Plan records, the guitar work of most bands became extremely technical as well and "not only musically challenging, but physically demanding."

In a 2016 article, Ian Cory of Invisible Oranges described mathcore's emphasis on technical complexity as "the means by which" they attain the aggressiveness of punk, "but never the end unto itself", distinguishing it from "the overflowing excess" of progressive metal. Writer Keith Kahn-Harris has described some mathcore bands as a mix between the aggressiveness of grindcore and the idioms of free jazz.

=== Lyrics ===
Early mathcore lyrics were addressed from a realistic worldview and with a pessimistic, defiant, resentful or sarcastic point of view. They have been singled out for their philosophical and poetic elements. Some bands satirized and criticized the militant branches of the hardcore punk ideologies prominent in the 1990s. Others, such as Converge's Jacob Bannon and The Dillinger Escape Plan's Dimitri Minakakis, wrote about deeply personal issues.

Although musically rooted in extreme metal, some mathcore artists have shown contempt for extreme metal fictional and horror lyrics.

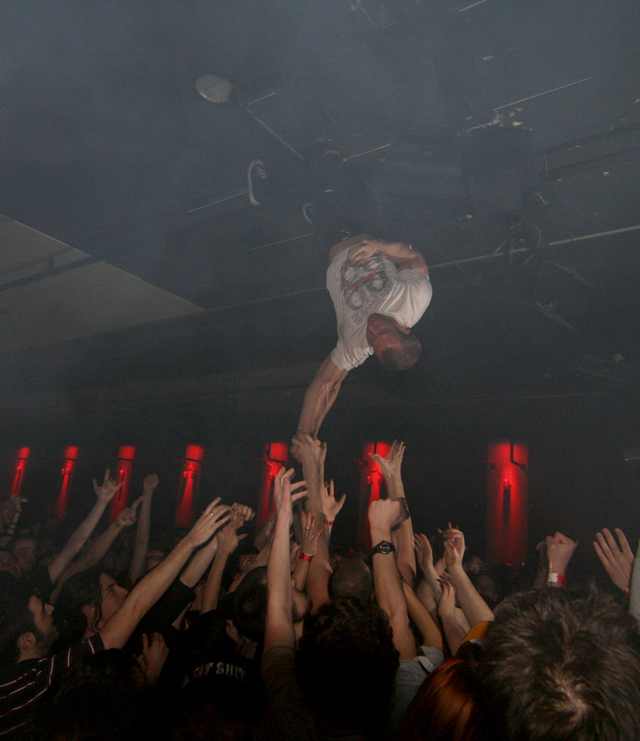
Greg Puciato singing while hanging head down from the ceiling in 2008

=== Live performances ===
Some early mathcore bands incorporated light shows synchronized with the music, while others were noted for their reckless, chaotic performances that usually ended up with fights and injuries. Guitarists Jes Steineger of Coalesce and Ben Weinman of The Dillinger Escape Plan commonly featured erratic and violent behaviors. In 2001, vocalist Greg Puciato joined The Dillinger Escape Plan and starred in the most controversial live performances of the band until their disbandment in 2017, being described by Invisible Oranges as "the perfect physical embodiment of [the band's music]" because of his imposing physique along with destructive behavior.

== Etymology ==
Before the term "mathcore" was coined, mainly in the 1990s, the style had been referred to as "chaotic hardcore" or "noisecore", though the genre's existence before this time is generally recognized. Kevin Stewart-Panko of Terrorizer referred to groups such as Neurosis, Deadguy, Cave In, Today Is the Day, The Dillinger Escape Plan, Converge, Coalesce, Candiria, Botch, and Psyopus as falling under this label. Stewart-Panko described the sound of these bands as a "dynamic, violent, discordant, technical, brutal, off-kilter, no rules mixture of hardcore, metal, prog, math rock, grind and jazz."

The term is generally applied by journalists, rather than by musicians themselves. Jacob Bannon of Converge stated:

I really don't know what mathcore is. Converge is an aggressive band. We have elements of hardcore, punk, and metal for sure. But I think trying to define our efforts and other bands with a generic subgenre name is counter productive. We all have something unique to offer and should be celebrated for those qualities rather than having them generalized for easy consumption.

== History ==
=== Precedents (1980s to early 1990s) ===
Early antecedents to mathcore were practiced by post-hardcore bands of the 1980s and early 1990s. Post-hardcore is a broad term to define bands that maintain the aggressiveness and intensity of hardcore punk but emphasizes a greater degree of creative expression. Hardcore punk pioneers Black Flag incorporated characteristics reminiscent to mathcore during their mid-1980s experimental period, including heavy metal laden riffs and lengthy songs, as well as fusion-style time signatures, polyrhythms, instrumental songs and improvisational sections. At that time, their biggest influences were the Mahavishnu Orchestra and King Crimson during its 1972–1975 lineup. Author Steven Blush said that their new direction "proved too much for many fans", yet numerous mathcore trailblazers would later credit Black Flag as an inspiration. Among others post-hardcore bands usually credited are: Minutemen, who were heavily influenced by avant-garde rock and jazz; the Jesus Lizard, inspired by progressive rock; Fugazi; and Drive Like Jehu, who drew from math rock and krautrock.

=== Early development (1990–1995) ===
In the 1990s, the hardcore punk scene started to embrace extreme metal openly and also was highly ideologized, with most of the popular bands being part of subcultures, religions or political groups. Some mathcore bands started inspired by straight edge and Hare Krishna groups, including Converge, Coalesce and Botch.

Two bands usually credited as mathcore forerunners are mid-westerners Dazzling Killmen and Craw, who at the time were considered part of the "noisier" branch of math rock. Their debut albums were released in 1992 and 1993 respectively. They were characterized by a "metallic post-hardcore" sound but with constant time signature changes and vocals with an "animalistic sound of a man losing his mind". Three out of four members of Dazzling Killmen knew each other from jazz school, while Craw had a classical percussionist and a jazz bassist. Both were joined by saxophonists on some performances.

In 1989, New Jersey band Rorschach was formed within the youth crew hardcore scene but soon developed a more complex and dissonant metallic hardcore style. They were influenced by hardcore punk bands such as Die Kreuzen and Black Flag, as well as thrash metal bands Voivod and Slayer. After their disbandment in 1993, their guitarist Keith Huckins joined Deadguy in 1994 and played on their first studio album, 1995's Fixation on a Co-Worker. The discordant sound of both bands had a profound impact on the first mathcore bands.

At this period, several pioneering mathcore bands began to form: Botch from Washington in 1993; Coalesce from Missouri, Cable from Connecticut and Knut from Switzerland in 1994; Cave In from Massachusetts and Drowningman from Vermont in 1995. In 1990, Massachusetts band Converge was formed but they started writing and playing what they consider "relevant" music in 1994. Referring to the burgeoning mathcore scene, The Dillinger Escape Plan's founder and guitarist Ben Weinman said:

The [hardcore punk] scene I was in initially was really pretty close-minded... was really revolved around causes: veganism, Christianity, Krishna, straight edge, all that stuff was a huge part of all the bands that were playing ... it became just kind of this clique and this popularity contest. [They] weren't concerned with music, they weren't great musicians, they weren't pushing themselves, they were writing music that just sounded like the bands from before but without that passion and innovation. ... And it was great to see bands like [Dazzling Killmen and Deadguy] who were just music and just killing it, and had so many different influences, were underground, but still musically-driven. ... And I was like: "That's what I want to do!"

— Ben Weinman, 2011

=== Establishment, milestone albums and first scene (1996–2002) ===
Converge was formed as an amalgamation of extreme metal, crossover thrash and hardcore punk, but in the mid-1990s they were heavily affected by early metalcore and post-hardcore bands, such as Rorschach, Universal Order of Armageddon and Starkweather. Their second and third albums, 1996's Petitioning the Empty Sky and 1998's When Forever Comes Crashing, developed an increasingly technical and bleak style.

At their first stages, Coalesce and Botch were influenced by Syracuse, New York metalcore and vegan straight edge pioneers Earth Crisis. Vocalist Sean Ingram relocated to Syracuse to be nearer to its scene, but ended up disillusioned with their ostracizing attitude and on his return to Missouri formed Coalesce. They incorporated influences from progressive metal band Tool, with founding drummer Jim Redd stating that they "wanted to be" them "with none of the quiet parts", but only using their "heavy guitars, heavy drums, wacky time signatures, and loud-quiet dynamics". Whereas their debut album Give Them Rope (1997) was considered "an underground milestone that helped [further] what was soon [universally] called 'metalcore'", their sophomore studio album, Functioning on Impatience, became a landmark of mathcore in 1998.

Botch initially tried to become a political-straight edge band but got discouraged by the "elitist" and aggressive stance of many of their participants. Their second album We Are the Romans of November 1999 was influenced by Drive Like Jehu, Sepultura and Meshuggah. This album has influenced numerous bands and met high critical acclaim throughout the years, being lauded by TeamRock in 2015 as "one of the greatest albums in the history of heavy music".

In 1997, The Dillinger Escape Plan evolved from the political-oriented act Arcane because they did not want to become part of "cliques" again. They turned around their sound significantly in their second EP, Under the Running Board of 1998, and their debut album, Calculating Infinity of September 1999, drawing from progressive death metal bands Cynic, Meshuggah and Death, as well as King Crimson and several jazz fusion artists. Both records created an extremely technical and fast brand of mathcore, which "launched an arms race in the metallic hardcore scene" and went on to define the subgenre substantially. Relapse Records marketed Calculating Infinity as "math metal" because its sound and the album's title "sounded mathematical", yet this was not the band's intent.

In 1999, Converge released the split album The Poacher Diaries expanding drastically their technical elements, but afterwards main songwriter Kurt Ballou called it "a failed experiment". This inspired him to change his focus to song structure and the "memorable" elements that initially attracted him to music, birthing their 2001 album Jane Doe. This record was the first with drummer Ben Koller and bassist Nate Newton who made significant contributions to the songwriting. Jane Doe exerted considerable influence in extreme music circles and attained a cult following.

Other important albums of this period are 1996's Variable Speed Drive by Cable, 1998's Until Your Heart Stops by Cave In, 2000's Rock and Roll Killing Machine by Drowningman, and 2002's Challenger by Knut.

=== Contemporary influence (early 2000s) ===
In the early 2000s several new mathcore bands started to emerge. Norma Jean's earlier records are often compared to Converge and Botch. Other new mathcore bands that cite older mathcore bands as an influence or are compared to them include Car Bomb, The Locust, Daughters, Some Girls, Look What I Did, The Number Twelve Looks Like You and Ion Dissonance.

=== 2010s–present ===
Bands such as Rolo Tomassi, Frontierer, the Armed, SeeYouSpaceCowboy have been described as modern practitioners of the genre by Bandcamp.

== Subgenres and fusion genres ==
=== Mathgrind ===
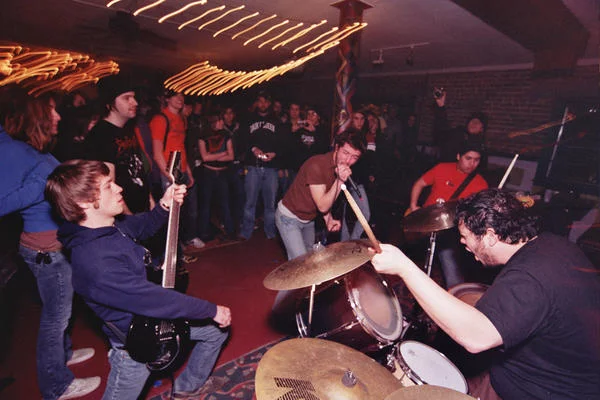
Tower of Rome live.

Mathgrind (also known as techgrind or technical grindcore) is a fusion genre between mathcore and grindcore. It blends the extreme speed and abrasive nature of grindcore with the complex time signatures and technicality of mathcore. It was most prevalent in the early 2000s, with bands like Tower of Rome and Daughters.

== See also ==
- List of mathcore bands
