= Second Nature Recordings =

- Founded: 1995
- Founder: Dan Askew
- Distributor(s): Lumberjack Mordam
- Genre: Indie rock
- Country of origin: U.S.
- Location: Kansas City, Missouri
- Official website: www.secondnaturerecordings.com

Second Nature Recordings is an independent record label based in Kansas City, Missouri. It specializes in indie rock and co-releases vinyl pressings for other labels. The label has released material by Coalesce, The Blood Brothers, Waxwing, These Arms Are Snakes, and The Casket Lottery.

Second Nature was founded by Dan Askew after he started a zine in high school also entitled Second Nature. His zine was combined with a friend's with the intention of releasing compilation CDs. The label released a CD compiling some of Coalesce's unreleased tracks with their 7" demo, and Askew joined the band for a tour.

== See also ==
- List of record labels
