= Smoking Popes discography =

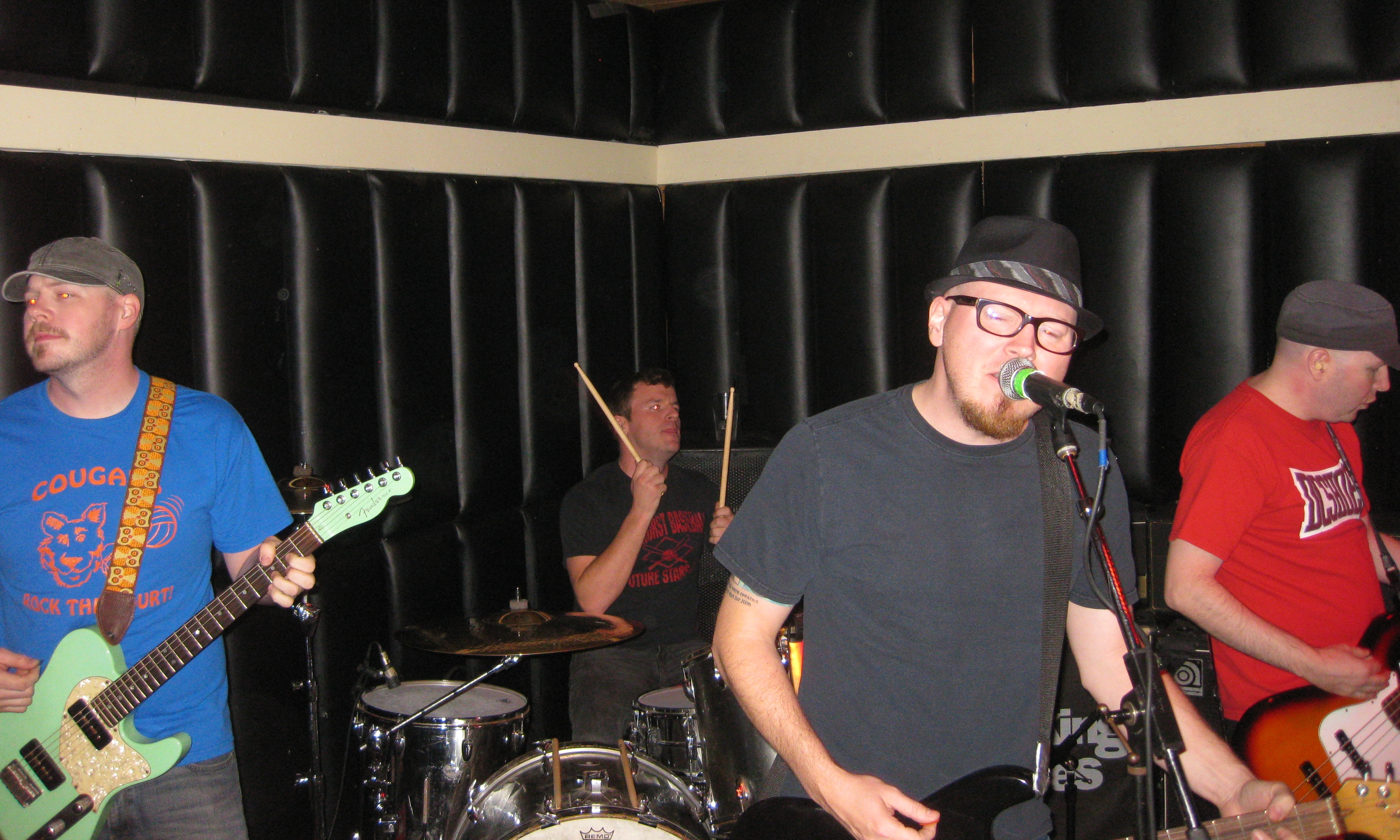
- Left to right: Eli Caterer, Neil Hennessy, Josh Caterer, and Matt Caterer in 2012
- Studio albums: 6
- Extended plays: 6
- Live albums: 2
- Compilation albums: 2
- Singles: 5
- Video albums: 1
- Music videos: 4
- Other appearances: 2

Smoking Popes, a Chicago-based pop punk band, has released six studio albums, two live albums, two compilation albums, six EPs, five singles, one video album, and four music videos.

Smoking Popes was founded in 1991 by brothers Josh and Matt Caterer, with Josh on vocals and guitar and Matt on bass guitar. With drummer Dave Martens they released their debut EP Inoculator through local Chicago label Radius Records. Martens was then replaced by Mike Felumlee and the band released the EPs Break Up (1992) and 2 (1993) themselves. Josh and Matt's brother Eli Caterer then joined on second guitar and the band signed to local label Johann's Face Records, releasing their debut album Get Fired in 1993.

The band's second album, Born to Quit, was released in 1994 through Johann's Face. Smoking Popes then signed to major label Capitol Records, who re-released Born to Quit in the summer of 1995. It became their only release to chart, reaching #37 on Billboard's Top Heatseekers chart, partly on the strength of the single "Need You Around" which reached #35 on the Modern Rock Tracks chart. Destination Failure followed in 1997. They next recorded an album of cover songs titled The Party's Over, but Capitol rejected it and the band broke up in December 1998.

Following Smoking Popes' breakup Josh and Eli Caterer and Mike Felumlee performed together in Duvall. Felumlee also founded Double Zero Records and released several albums of previously recorded Smoking Popes material: the compilation 1991–1998 appeared in 1999, followed by Live in 2000 and a release of the Capitol-rejected The Party's Over in 2001.

In November 2005 Smoking Popes, with drummer Rob Kellenberger, reunited to play Chicago's Flower 15 festival. The performance was recorded and released as the CD/DVD package At Metro through Victory Records in February 2006. Ryan Chavez drummed on the band's fifth studio album, Stay Down, released in 2008 through Curb Appeal Records. Neil Hennessy of fellow Chicago punk rock band The Lawrence Arms became Smoking Popes' permanent drummer prior to the album's release. In February 2010 Asian Man Records released the compilation album It's Been a Long Day. The band's sixth studio album, This Is Only a Test, was released March 15, 2011 through Asian Man.

== Studio albums ==
Year	Album details	Peak chart positions
Year	Album details	US
Year	Album details	Heatseekers
1993	Get Fired: Released: 1993; Label: Johann's Face (JFR011); Formats: LP, CD	—
1994	Born to Quit: Released: 1994; Label: Johann's Face; Formats: CD	37
1997	Destination Failure: Released: August 26, 1997; Label: Capitol (CDP724383821723); Formats: CD	—
2001	The Party's Over: Released: 2001; Label: Double Zero (DZ0012); Formats: CD	—
2008	Stay Down: Released: August 5, 2008; Label: Curb Appeal; Formats: CD	—
2011	This Is Only a Test: Released: March 15, 2011; Label: Asian Man; Formats: CD	—
2018	Into the Agony: Released: October 12, 2018; Label: Asian Man; Formats: LP, Digital	—
"—" denotes releases that did not chart.

== Live albums ==
Year	Album details
2000	Live: Released: April 25, 2000; Label: Double Zero (DZ0003); Formats: CD
2006	At Metro: Released: February 28, 2006; Label: Victory (VR295); Formats: CD/DVD

== Compilation albums ==
Year	Album details
1999	1991–1998: Released: August 17, 1999; Label: Double Zero (DZ001); Format: CD
2010	It's Been a Long Day: Released: February 16, 2010; Label: Asian Man (AMR0192); Format: CD

== EPs ==
Year	Album details
1991	Inoculator: Released: 1991; Label: Radius; Format: EP
1992	Break Up: Released: 1992; Label: none; Format: EP
1993	2: Released: 1993; Label: none; Format: EP
1993	Smoking Popes / Groovy Love Vibes: Released: 1993; Label: Johann's Face (JFR009); Format: EP
1997	Egg Nog^{[I]}: Released: 1997; Label: Capitol (7PRO-11335/11336); Format: 7"
2012	Complete Control Recording Sessions: Released: May 22, 2012; Label: Side One Dummy (SD1488-7); Format: 7", download

I Egg Nog is a promotional holiday release limited to 1,500 copies. Its A-side is a cover version of "O Holy Night" recorded for Richard Milne's 1995 Christmas Eve Show on WXRT-FM, while the B-side is a cover of "Pure Imagination" taken from Destination Failure.

== Singles ==
Year	Single	Peak chart positions	Album
Year	Single	US	Album
Year	Single	Modern Rock	Album
1995	"Rubella"	—	Born to Quit
1995	"Need You Around"	35	Born to Quit
1997	"I Know You Love Me"	—	Destination Failure
1997	"Before I'm Gone"	—	Destination Failure
2007	Alkaline Trio / Smoking Popes	—	n/a
"—" denotes releases that did not chart. "n/a" denotes singles that are not from albums.

== Video albums ==
Year	Video details
2006	At Metro: Released: February 28, 2006; Label: Victory (VR295); Formats: DVD/CD

== Music videos ==
Year	Song	Director	Album
1995	"Rubella"		Born to Quit
1995	"Need You Around"		Born to Quit
1997	"I Know You Love Me"		Destination Failure
2011	"Punk Band"		This Is Only a Test

== Other appearances ==
The following Smoking Popes songs were released on compilation albums. This is not an exhaustive list; songs that were first released on the band's albums, EPs, or singles are not included.

Year	Release details	Track(s)
1993	Achtung Chicago! Zwei!: Released: 1993; Label: Underdog; Format: EP	"Run Away"^{[I]}^{[II]}
1997	An Instrumental Thing: Released: 1997; Label: Polygram; Format: CD	"Ft. Stockton, TX"

I Denotes songs that were re-released on 1991–1998.

II Denotes songs that were re-released on It's Been a Long Day.
