= Jerzy the Giant =

Studio album by The Terrible Twos
- Released: July 29, 2008
- Recorded: 2008
- Genres: Children's Music; Alternative rock
- Label: Vagrant Records

The Terrible Twos chronology
If You Ever See an Owl... (2007)	Jerzy the Giant (2008)

Professional ratings
Review scores
Source	Rating
AllMusic	4/5 stars
Common Sense Media	4/5 stars

Jerzy the Giant is the second album by The Terrible Twos.

== History ==
After the mild critical praise of the outfit's previous album If You Ever See an Owl..., the group's lead singer Matt Pryor began writing more songs, partly inspired by his daughter Lily, (who contributed several lyrics to many of the songs) as well as his youngest son Jerzy, whom the album is named after. The album was recorded in the summer of 2007 in Pryor's home studio with the other members of The New Amsterdams. The album was recorded in a month at Pryor's home studio, and edited and mixed at the same time Pryor was recording his first-ever solo album Confidence Man.

== Track listing ==
All tracks are written by The Terrible Twos.

Jerzy the Giant
No.	Title	Length
1.	"Old Man Miller"	2:01
2.	"Big Baby J"	2:31
3.	"Consonants"	1:01
4.	"Archibald McCallister"	1:40
5.	"Jerzy the Giant"	1:54
6.	"Great Big Poop"	1:05
7.	"Amelia Minor"	1:36
8.	"Elliott Oooh"	2:09
9.	"Jump Jump Jump"	2:06
10.	"Watch Out For Lions"	1:17
11.	"Lily Names Everything Sandy"	1:55
12.	"Playground"	2:22
13.	"Say Say Anything"	2:25
14.	"Olly Olly Oxen Free"	2:14
15.	"The Plan"	1:35
16.	"Whispering The Melody"	1:20

== Personnel ==
- Matt Pryor - Vocals, Guitar
- Bill Belzer - Drums
- Eric McCann - Upright Bass
- Dustin Kinsey - Guitar
- Zach Holland - Keyboard
