= The Terrible Twos =

Rock band, plays children's music

- Also known as: the New Amsterdams
- Origin: Lawrence, Kansas, U.S.
- Genres: Children's music, indie rock, acoustic rock
- Years active: 2005–present
- Labels: Vagrant
- Members: Matt Pryor; Dustin Kinsey; Eric McCann; Bill Belzer; Jason Rich

The Terrible Twos are an alternative children's band from Lawrence, Kansas. They have the same line-up as the New Amsterdams.

== History ==
In 2005 after the Get Up Kids split up, lead singer Matt Pryor turned his focus on his other band the New Amsterdams and, primarily, his children. The main reason the Get Up Kids split up was due to Pryor's disenchantment with touring, and his desire to spend more time with his children. As he spent more time with them, he began writing children's songs. Eventually, he showed these songs to his bandmates, and they decided to perform them. Pryor's goal was to create music that would engage children, but entertain their parents as well. Eventually, they recorded their first album, If You Ever See an Owl.... After the album was complete, however, it was not released immediately due to the band members focusing on the New Amsterdams. Alongside this, they wanted artist and friend Travis Miller to illustrate a storybook to be packaged with the album. Finally, in 2005 the album was released independently, then re-released on Vagrant Records in 2007.

Since then, the band has done sporadic shows at various children's book stores and other venues in-between tour dates with the New Amsterdams. They have also recorded a second album, Jerzy the Giant, which was released on July 29, 2008, on Vagrant Records, the same day as Matt Pryor's first solo album Confidence Man.

== Discography ==
Year	Album	Label	Release date
2007	If You Ever See an Owl...	Vagrant Records	April 10, 2007
2008	Jerzy the Giant	Vagrant Records	July 29, 2008
