= Need You Around =

- Cover of the CD single

Single by the Smoking Popes

from the album Born to Quit
- Released: 1995
- Recorded: 1994 at Solid Sound Studios in Hoffman Estates, Illinois
- Genre: Pop punk, alternative rock, indie rock
- Label: Capitol
- Songwriter(s): Josh Caterer
- Producer(s): Phil Bonnet

Smoking Popes singles chronology
"Rubella" (1995)	"Need You Around" (1995)	"I Know You Love Me" (1997)

Alternative cover
- Cover of the 7" vinyl single

"Need You Around" is a song by the Chicago-based pop punk band the Smoking Popes, released as the second single from their 1994 album Born to Quit. The album was originally released by Johann's Face Records in 1994, and "Need You Around" received radio play on Chicago's Q101 and Los Angeles' KROQ. When Born to Quit was re-released in July 1995 by Capitol Records after the band signed to that label, "Need You Around" and "Rubella" were remixed by Thom Wilson for release as singles (the album had been engineered, produced, and originally mixed by Phil Bonnet). A music video for "Need You Around" was filmed, and the song was featured in the soundtrack of the film Clueless. It became the only Smoking Popes song to chart, reaching #35 on Billboard's Modern Rock Tracks.

The single was released in two formats: as a 7" single with "Need You Around" as the A-side and the additional album track "Adena" as the B-side, and as a CD single with these two tracks as well as a cover version of Willie Nelson's "Angel Flying Too Close to the Ground" and a live recording of "Adena".

"Need You Around" was covered by Retro Morning for the 2003 Smoking Popes Tribute album.

Josh Caterer recorded a new arrangement of "Need You Around" with John San Juan, Max Crawford and John Perrin in 2020 as the first single from The Hideout Sessions.

== Track listing ==
All songs written and composed by Josh Caterer, except where noted.

=== CD version ===
No.	Title	Length
1.	"Need You Around"	3:43
2.	"Adena"	1:47
3.	"Angel Flying Too Close to the Ground" (written and originally performed by Willie Nelson)
4.	"Adena" (live)

=== 7" version ===
Side A
No.	Title	Length
1.	"Need You Around"	3:43

Side B
No.	Title	Length
1.	"Adena"	1:47
Total length:		5:30

== Personnel ==
=== Band ===
- Josh Caterer – vocals, guitar
- Eli Caterer – guitar
- Matt Caterer – bass guitar
- Mike Felumlee – drums

=== Production ===
- Phil Bonnet – recording engineer, producer
- Thom Wilson – mix engineer
