= Wrist Slitter =

Album by Matt Pryor

Studio album by Matt Pryor
- Released: November 12, 2013
- Recorded: 2013
- Genre: Indie rock
- Label: Rory Records / Equal Vision Records / Alcopop! Records in the UK / Arctic Rodeo in Europe
- Producer: Matt Pryor

Matt Pryor chronology
May Day (2012)	Wrist Slitter (2013)

Wrist Slitter is the third solo album by The New Amsterdams and The Get Up Kids frontman Matt Pryor. The album was released on Max Bemis's Rory Records imprint for Equal Vision Records in the US, Arctic Rodeo in Europe and Alcopop! Records in the UK.

== Track listing ==
All tracks are written by Matt Pryor.

Wrist Slitter
No.	Title	Length
1.	"The House Hears Everything"	2:41
2.	"Kinda Go To Pieces"	3:21
3.	"Wrist Slitter"	1:03
4.	"Words Get In the Way"	2:26
5.	"Before My Tongue Becomes a Sword"	2:59
6.	"If I Wear a Disguise"	1:53
7.	"As Perfect As We'll Ever Be"	3:01
8.	"Foolish Kids"	2:13
9.	"Say What You're Gonna Say"	1:21
10.	"So Many Questions"	2:31
11.	"There Is No Us"	2:23
12.	"Won't Speak To Me"	2:54

== Personnel ==
- Matt Pryor - Vocals, Guitar, Percussion, Piano, Production
- Steve Soboslai - Vocals on "Words Get In The Way"
- Bob Nanna - Vocals on "Before My Tongue Becomes a Sword"
- Chris Conley - Vocals on "Before My Tongue Becomes a Sword"
- Ed Rose - Production
