= Stay Down (album) =

Studio album by Smoking Popes
- Released: August 5, 2008
- Recorded: 2007–2008
- Genre: Indie rock, pop punk
- Label: Curb Appeal Records

Smoking Popes chronology
At Metro (2006)	Stay Down (2008)	This Is Only a Test (2011)

Professional ratings
Review scores
Source	Rating
AbsolutePunk.net	79% link

Stay Down is the fifth studio album by the American, Chicago-based pop punk group, Smoking Popes. Released on Curb Appeal Records on August 5, 2008, it was the band's first studio album since their 2005 reunion and their first album of original material since 1997's Destination Failure. It's the only Smoking Popes album to feature drummer Ryan Chavez, who joined the band in 2006.

== Release ==
On May 16, 2008, "If You Don't Care" was posed on the band's Myspace profile. Between June and August 2008, the band went on a US tour. Shortly after the release of the album Curb Appeal Records folded and the album went out of print. The album's troubled release influenced the band's decision to find an established label and tour heavily behind their follow-up album, 2011's This Is Only A Test.

In 2011, the album was scheduled for rerelease, alongside Get Fired and Born to Quit, on Asian Man Records. By 2012, the release had been removed from the schedule and the band had moved on to SideOneDummy Records.

== Track listing ==
All tracks are written by Josh Caterer.

Stay Down
No.	Title	Length
1.	"Welcome to Janesville"	3:15
2.	"If You Don't Care"	4:16
3.	"Stefanie"	4:35
4.	"Sweet Pea"	3:09
5.	"Little Jane-Marie"	4:50
6.	"The Corner"	5:02
7.	"Stay Down"	4:27
8.	"Grab Your Heart and Run"	2:54
9.	"It's Never Too Late (For Love)"	4:13
10.	"Maybe I'll Stay"	3:28
11.	"Into the Summer Sky"	4:41
12.	"First Time"	3:54
