= Never You Mind =

Studio album by The New Amsterdams
- Released: September 19, 2000
- Recorded: March – April 2000
- Genre: Acoustic rock Indie rock
- Length: 33:03
- Label: Vagrant
- Producer: Alex Brahl; Rob Pope; Matthew Pryor

The New Amsterdams chronology
Never You Mind (2000)	Para Toda Vida (2002)

Professional ratings
Review scores
Source	Rating
Ox-Fanzine	Favorable

Never You Mind is the first album by The New Amsterdams recorded in March/April 2000 at Z'gwonth Studios in Lawrence, Kansas and released September 19, 2000 on Vagrant Records and Heroes & Villains Records.

== Background ==
The record was released at a time when The Get Up Kids were becoming more and more successful. At this point, The New Amsterdams became an acoustic side project from The Get Up Kids.

"Slow Down" is a cover from the American punk/emo band Boilermaker from San Diego, California. "When We Two Parted" is a cover from the American alternative rock band The Afghan Whigs.

== Track listing ==
All tracks are written by The New Amsterdams except for "Slow Down", written by Boilermaker, and "When We Two Parted", written by Greg Dulli and Rick McCollum.

No.	Title	Length
1.	"Every Double Life"	2:06
2.	"Lonely Hearts"	2:31
3.	"Proceed With Caution"	3:37
4.	"Slow Down"	2:19
5.	"McShame"	1:10
6.	"Goodbye"	2:10
7.	"Idaho"	4:35
8.	"Drama Queen"	1:31
9.	"Make Me Change My Mind"	2:32
10.	"When We Two Parted"	3:35
11.	"Never Treat Others"	4:09
12.	"I Won't Run Away"	2:48
Total length:		33:03

== Reception ==
"The New Amsterdams' debut Never You Mind placates the frustration in a wispy, folk beauty for surely Pryor has tried to outdo himself this time… This is an honest record where the craftsmanship is perfectly stripped, not hushing like his emo predecessors, but certainly moving in a way where the simplicity still matters." – Allmusic

"People who liked songs like "Out of Reach" or "Valentine" from the last Get Up Kids album should definitely check this out. The songs are on the border between melancholy and euphoria." – Ox-Fanzine

== Artwork ==
During a Facebook Live video on March 23, 2020, Matt Pryor stated that the cover artwork is a portrait of Danny Pound from the band Vitreous Humor by artist Travis Millard.

== Personnel ==
- Matt Pryor – Vocals, Guitar, Producer
- James Dewees – Cello
- Ed Rose – Guitar-Solo on "Never Treat Others"
- Rob Pope – Producer
- Alex Brahl – Producer
- Andrew Ellis – Booking
