= Angel Flying Too Close to the Ground =

1981 single by Willie Nelson

Single by Willie Nelson

from the album Honeysuckle Rose
- B-side: "I Guess I've Come to Live Here in Your Eyes"
- Released: January 1981
- Genre: Country
- Length: 4:27
- Label: Columbia
- Songwriter: Willie Nelson
- Producer: Willie Nelson

Willie Nelson singles chronology
"On the Road Again" (1980)	"Angel Flying Too Close to the Ground" (1981)	"Mona Lisa" (1981)

"Angel Flying Too Close to the Ground" is a song from the film Honeysuckle Rose. The song was written and recorded by American singer Willie Nelson and released in 1980 on the Honeysuckle Rose soundtrack and later as the soundtrack's second single in January 1981. The single was Nelson's seventh number one on the country chart as a solo artist and stayed at number one for one week and spent a total of fourteen weeks on the country chart.

== Charts ==
Chart (1981)	Peak position
US Hot Country Songs (Billboard)	1
Canadian RPM Country Tracks	1

== Cover versions ==
- Bob Dylan covered the song during the recording sessions for his 1983 album Infidels. The song appeared as the B-side to four different international single releases in support of the album.
- Cross Canadian Ragweed covered the song on their tenth album, Happiness and All the Other Things.
- Raul Malo covered the song on his 2006 album You're Only Lonely.
- The Smoking Popes included a cover of the song on the re-issue of their 1995 album Born to Quit.
- The King of the Hill soundtrack included a version of the song on which Nelson duets with Mark McGrath. The original, not this version, appeared in "Wings of the Dope" (the episode in which Luanne's deceased boyfriend reappears as an angel).
- Alison Krauss recorded a cover of the song and included it on the Target Corporation exclusive version of her 2017 release Windy City.
- Lukas Nelson Live at the Hollywood bowl on Willie Nelson's 90th birthday.
- English singer-songwriter Beth Rowley included a version of the song on her 2008 album, Little Dreamer (Beth Rowley album).
