= Kill or Cure =

Kill or Cure may refer to:

== Films ==
- Kill or Cure (1923 film), a film starring Stan Laurel
- Kill or Cure (1962 film), a British comedy film

== Music ==
- Killed or Cured, an album by The New Amsterdams
