= Outroduction =

Studio album by The New Amsterdams
- Released: March 5, 2013
- Genre: Acoustic rock
- Label: Nightshoes Syndicate

The New Amsterdams chronology
The Companion of My Rival (2008)	Outroduction (2013)

Outroduction is collection of B-Sides by The New Amsterdams. It is intended to be the final release by the band, allowing Matt Pryor to continue pursuing a solo career.

== Track listing ==
All tracks are written by The New Amsterdams.

Outroduction
No.	Title	Length
1.	"Guitarkansas"	2:03
2.	"Dear Lover"	3:01
3.	"Ex's & Oh's"	3:23
4.	"Too Many of a Good Thing"	2:57
5.	"Stand Here and Bleed"	2:06
6.	"Whatever You Say"	3:10
7.	"A Mile in Your Shoes"	2:25
8.	"Heaven Sent"	3:25
9.	"The Ballad of Mike and Beth"	3:28
10.	"Your Look Gave You Away"	3:08
11.	"Old Enough to Know Bitter"	2:33
12.	"A Long Event"	2:54
13.	"Suit Sacrifice"	2:06
14.	"The Connoisseur"	3:23

== Reception ==
"Whether it's with emo legends the Get Up Kids or his more folk-oriented solo project the New Amsterdams, Matt Pryor is a songwriter who seems beautifully adept at finding just the right balance between sugary sweet pop and earnest emotion. Able to keep things light without becoming saccharine and heartfelt without being too heavy-handed, Pryor is at the vanguard of heart-on-sleeve musicians." - Allmusic

"Who knew an album of outtakes and B-sides could work so well? [...] Even though Outroduction is a swan song of sorts, it’s a great place to check out The New Amsterdams’ brand of folky indie rock. While the band may be no more (though Pryor is apparently going solo), these are songs worth hearing, and the fact that these are leftovers only makes them that much more impressive." - The firenote

== Personnel ==
- Matt Pryor - Vocals, Guitar
- Bill Belzer - Drums
- Eric McCann - Upright Bass
- Dustin Kinsey - Guitar
- Jason Rich
- Zach Holland - Keyboard
- Roget Moutenout - Producer, Mixing
