= Confidence man =

A confidence man is a practitioner of confidence tricks. Confidence Man may also refer to:

== Books ==
- Confidence Man: The Making of Donald Trump and the Breaking of America, a 2022 book by Maggie Haberman
- The Confidence-Man, novel by Herman Melville
- The Confessions of Felix Krull, Confidence Man, a.k.a. Confessions of Felix Krull, unfinished novel by Thomas Mann

== TV & films ==
- Confidence Man, 2004, eighth episode of the first series of television series Lost
- The Confidence Man, the sixth episode (2018-01-26) of Dirty Money (2018 TV series) (Subject: Donald Trump)
- The Confidence Man (film), 1924 silent film directed by Victor Heerman

== Music ==
- Confidence Man, a 1988 album (including track 7 of the same name) by Matt Pryor, an American musician
- Confidence Man, a 1988 single by the Jeff Healey Band, a Canadian blues, rock and jazz guitarist, singer and songwriter
- Confidence Man, an Australian electropop band formed in 2016

== See also ==
- Con man (disambiguation)
