= Para Toda Vida =

Studio album by The New Amsterdams
- Released: January 22, 2002
- Recorded: 2001
- Genre: Acoustic rock Country music
- Label: Vagrant Records
- Producer: Matthew Pryor; Alex Brahl

The New Amsterdams chronology
Never You Mind (2000)	Para Toda Vida (2002)	Worse for the Wear (2003)

Professional ratings
Review scores
Source	Rating
Ox-Fanzine	Unfavorable

Para Toda Vida is the second album by The New Amsterdams recorded in 2001 and released on January 22, 2002, on Vagrant Records and Heroes & Villains Records.

== Background ==
It was recorded at Z'gwonth Studios, Lawrence Kansas nearly at the same period as the Get Up Kids-Album On a Wire, but it was realised a few months earlier. The Song "Forever Leaving" was originally performed by "The Tijuana Crime Scene" from Kansas, the origin Band of the album-producer Alex Brahl. "All Ears" is a Cover of the indie/alternative rock band "Kill Creek" from Lawrence, Kansas.

== Track listing ==
All tracks are written by Matthew Pryor, except for "All Ears", written by Kill Creek and "Forever Leaving", written by Alex Brahl.

No.	Title	Length
1.	"My Old Man Had a Pistol"	3:06
2.	"Picture in the Paper"	2:59
3.	"Son of a Prophet"	2:37
4.	"Stay on the Phone"	4:29
5.	"That Side of Me"	2:39
6.	"Four More Years"	2:51
7.	"Forever Leaving"	2:20
8.	"Adeline, Out of Tune"	1:54
9.	"All Ears"	1:57
10.	"Losing You"	3:29

== Reception ==
" If one enjoys the Get Up Kids, and especially those songs of theirs when they are mellower and/or acoustic, then this will truly be a delight. Fans of the first album will probably like this one, although much of the punch seems to be missing that was associated with the full-band sound of the debut. Not horribly deficient, yet not as powerful as it has the potential to be." - Allmusic

"...No, nothing against Pryor and his songs, somehow they are beautiful and nice and sometimes heartrendingly beautiful, but the real need to release this record and especially to own it [cannot be seen]." - Ox-Fanzine

"...[Pryor is] expecting that poignancy and emotional depth to spontaneously result from stripped-down instrumentation." - Pitchfork

== Personnel ==
- Matt Pryor - Performer, Producer
- Alex Brahl - Producer, Engineer
- Kendra Herring - Painting [Cover]
- Joby J Ford - Design
- Andrew Ellis - Booking

== Charts ==
Year	Album	Chart	Position
2002	Para Toda Vida	Independent Albums	50
