= Okie Baroque =

EP by Blackpool Lights
- Released: November 30, 2010
- Recorded: 2010
- Genre: Indie rock
- Length: 20:49
- Label: Legion of Boom Records
- Producer: Steve Wilson

Blackpool Lights chronology
This Town's Disaster (2006)	Okie Baroque (2010)

Okie Baroque is an EP (extended play) by American indie rock band Blackpool Lights. After touring to support their 2006 debut album This Town's Disaster, the band dissolved in 2008 for unknown reasons. In early 2010 after the reunion of lead singer Jim Suptic's other band The Get Up Kids, it was announced on Twitter that Blackpool Lights had reunited and was recording new material. The album was released online on November 30, 2010.

== Track listing ==
All tracks are written by Blackpool Lights.

Okie Baroque
No.	Title	Length
1.	"Sons and Daughters"	3:40
2.	"Still Waiting"	3:29
3.	"Desperate Times"	3:30
4.	"You Don't Need Me"	2:35
5.	"When I'm Gone"	4:33
6.	"Wonderful Life"	3:05

== Personnel ==
=== Band ===
- Jim Suptic – guitar, vocals
- Billy Brimblecom – drums

=== Production ===
- Steve Wilson – production mastering
