= Where Did I Go Wrong (disambiguation) =

Where Did I Go Wrong is a 1989 song by American country music artist Steve Wariner.

Where Did I Go Wrong may also refer to:

- "Where Did I Go Wrong", a 1988 song by UB40 from UB40
- "Where Did I Go Wrong", a 2000 song by Baha Men from Who Let the Dogs Out
- "Where Did I Go Wrong", a 2008 song by Matt Pryor from Confidence Man
