= Worse for the Wear =

Studio album by The New Amsterdams
- Released: August 5, 2003
- Recorded: December 2002 – February 2003 at Red House Studios
- Genre: Indie rock Acoustic rock
- Length: 32:22
- Label: Vagrant Records
- Producer: Ed Rose

The New Amsterdams chronology
Para Toda Vida (2002)	Worse for the Wear (2003)	Killed or Cured (2005)

Professional ratings
Review scores
Source	Rating
AllMusic	4.5/5 stars
Rolling Stone	4/5 stars

Worse for the Wear is the third album by The New Amsterdams, released in 2003 on Vagrant Records.

== Background ==
This is the first New Amsterdams album to have a full band, as the previous albums have always been primarily solo material from the lead singer Matt Pryor as a side project from The Get Up Kids. It was recorded over the course of three months at the Red House Studios in Eudora, Kansas. The album was recorded with Rob and Ryan Pope, as well as longtime friend and producer Ed Rose after the release of the third Get Up Kids album On a Wire, and because the band was promoting that album at the time, The New Amsterdams did not tour extensively to promote the album, although they did make an appearance on the Late Show with David Letterman. The 3rd episode of One Tree Hill, Season One, was named after 'Are You True?'.

== Track listing ==
All tracks are written by The New Amsterdams.

Worse for the Wear
No.	Title	Length
1.	"Vignette"	1:20
2.	"The Spoils of the Spoiled"	2:33
3.	"Hover Near Fame"	3:13
4.	"From California"	3:09
5.	"Hanging on for Hope"	3:20
6.	"The Smoking Gun"	3:14
7.	"Are You True?"	2:42
8.	"Asleep at the Wheel"	1:47
9.	"Poison in the Ink"	2:39
10.	"All Our Vice"	3:55
11.	"Worse for the Wear"	3:25
12.	"Slight Return"	1:05

== Reception ==
"With its touches of banjo, flashes of wry humor, and more sprightly tempos [...] Worse for the Wear is the most relaxed-sounding and brightest New Amsterdams record yet, and with songs as catchy as "The Spoils of the Spoiled," and the oddly '70s rock piano-based tune, "From California," the New Amsterdams are in danger of taking over from the Get Up Kids as Pryor's most interesting and memorable band." - Allmusic

"The most basic thing to be said is that the album is fine. It's not really that bad. Not really exciting, either . . . just fine." - popmatters

== Personnel ==
- Matt Pryor - Vocals, Guitar, Lap Steel, and Pump Organ (on "Vignette")
- Rob Pope - Bass
- Ryan Pope - Drums and Percussion
- Ed Rose - Guitar, Drums, Producer, Engineering, and Mixing
- Kory Willis - Banjo, Lap Steel
- Joe Gastwirt - Mastering
- Ron Hayes - Associate Producer
- Alex Brahl - Management
- Andrew Ellis - Booking
