= Kicker (EP) =

EP by the Get Up Kids
- Released: June 8, 2018
- Recorded: 2017
- Studio: Fire 'N' Ice Studio
- Genres: Emo; pop-punk
- Length: 13:00
- Label: Polyvinyl Record Co.
- Producer: The Get Up Kids

The Get Up Kids chronology
There Are Rules (2011)	Kicker (2018)	Problems (2019)

Kicker is an EP by American rock band the Get Up Kids. It was the first release from the band in seven years, and their first release on a record label other than Vagrant Records in 19 years. It was hailed as a return to form after the band's more experimental self-released reunion album There Are Rules (2011).

== Recording and release ==
The EP was the band's first release on Polyvinyl Record Co., their first music released on a label other than Vagrant Records since Live! @ the Granada Theater shortly before their breakup in 2005. Having taken an unofficial hiatus since the release of 2011's There Are Rules, the band began to talk about making new music at 2017's When We Were Young festival. The band had been touring on and off since their last album, but were feeling restless playing old music. On the EP's release, lead singer Matt Pryor said "we don't need to put out new music to make money. We can keep playing the old songs and going away and coming back for seemingly who knows how long. But the fact is: we wanted to make new art."

The track "Maybe" started as a discarded demo that songwriter & guitarist Jim Suptic found on an old tape from the Something to Write Home About era.

The EP was announced on April 8, 2018, alongside a 23-date summer tour and the release of the first single, "Maybe." After the release of the EP it reached number 10 on the Billboard Vinyl Albums chart.

== Critical reception ==
Professional ratings
Review scores
Source	Rating
AllMusic	3.5/5 stars
The Independent	3/5 stars
Kerrang!	8/10 stars
Pitchfork	6.7/10
PopMatters	6/10

The EP received largely positive reviews from critics. Pitchfork's Ian Cohen called Kicker "the most satisfying Get Up Kids release in nearly 20 years," commenting that it "effortlessly recapture[s]" the energy of the band's early work, and comparing its sound to bands like Beach Slang and Superchunk. UK's The Independent called the EP a "return to form" that "reveals an expected sense of maturity."

Tem Sendra of AllMusic also remarked on the release's departure from the band's more recent fare, writing "None of the measured indie rock sound of their late-period albums still exists; none of the electronics found on their previous reunion records made it through, either. Kicker is good-old emo with the energy of punk and the insistent melodies of pop, exactly what the Kids did so well at the turn of the century." Julie River of Punknews.org wrote that Kicker "mercifully jettisons the style of There Are Rules to return to the style of the first four Get Up Kids albums (albeit with a few new twists) for the first time since 2004's Guilt Show."

== Track listing ==
All tracks are written by The Get Up Kids.

Side A
No.	Title	Length
1.	"Maybe"	3:12
2.	"Better This Way"	3:02

Side B
No.	Title	Length
1.	"I'm Sorry"	3:12
2.	"My Own Reflection"	3:34

== Personnel ==
Album personnel as adapted from album liner notes:

"Band'

- Matt Pryor – lead vocals, guitar
- Jim Suptic – guitar, vocals
- Rob Pope – bass
- Ryan Pope – drums
- James Dewees – keyboards, vocals

'Design"

- Camm Roland – design
- Dalton Paley – band photo

Production

- The Get Up Kids – production
- Jim Vollentine – mixing
- Bob Weston – mastering
- Steve Squire – engineering
