= Con artist (disambiguation) =

A con artist is a person who performs a confidence trick.

Con artist may also refer to:

- The Con Artists (1976 film), an Italian crime-comedy film
- The Con Artist, a 2010 US romantic comedy film
- The Con Artists (2014 film), a South Korean heist film

== See also ==
- Confidence man (disambiguation)
- Con man (disambiguation)
