= Story Like a Scar =

Studio album by The New Amsterdams
- Released: March 21, 2006
- Genre: Acoustic rock
- Label: Vagrant
- Producer: Roger Moutenot

The New Amsterdams chronology
Killed or Cured (2005)	Story Like a Scar (2006)	At the Foot of My Rival (2007)

Professional ratings
Review scores
Source	Rating
AbsolutePunk	46% link

Story Like a Scar is the fifth album by The New Amsterdams released on March 21, 2006 on Vagrant Records.

== Track listing ==
All tracks are written by The New Amsterdams.

Story Like a Scar
No.	Title	Length
1.	"The Death Of Us"	4:16
2.	"Turn Out The Light"	4:23
3.	"Bad Liar"	1:44
4.	"Past The Pines"	2:10
5.	"Your Ghost"	5:24
6.	"Intelligent Design"	1:23
7.	"Calendar Days"	2:04
8.	"Beautiful Mistake"	3:18
9.	"A Small Crusade"	3:44
10.	"Turn Out The Light (reprise)"	0:44

== Reception ==
"However, on an album level, the songs don't always flow with one another and by the end, Story Like a Scar just seems a bit unfinished. With Pryor's desire to finish this record instead of releasing the other one (Killed or Cured), expectations might have been raised too high as the album finishes almost too soon, leaving one with a feeling of wanting something more." - Allmusic

"It used to be a side project, which was not really worth mentioning in the beginning. Pryor's scratchy Mickey Mouse voice and a bit of the acoustic. In the meantime it has matured to a higher priority. In this line-up it makes pretty nicely arranged folk songs [...] People sit around the campfire, sway and clap their hands. And in addition there are still those unmistakable Pryor melodies like in "Beautiful mistake" or "Turn out the lights" [...] When they hit, and they don't always do, they really do. Maybe it's just this simplicity that catapults "Story like a scar" back onto the good side. That smile that these little, uncomplicated songs can conjure up in your face. No matter if it's in a folk-, punk, emo- or anything else sound." - Plattentests.de

== Personnel ==
- Matt Pryor - Vocals, Guitar
- Bill Belzer - Drums
- Eric McCann - Upright Bass
- Dustin Kinsey - Guitar
- Jason Rich
- Zach Holland - Keyboard
- Roget Moutenout - Producer, Mixing
