= If You Ever See an Owl... =

Studio album by The Terrible Twos
- Released: April 10, 2007
- Recorded: 2006
- Genres: Children's Music; Alternative rock
- Length: 32:00
- Label: Vagrant Records

The Terrible Twos chronology
If You Ever See an Owl... (2007)	Jerzey the Giant (2008)

Professional ratings
Review scores
Source	Rating
AllMusic	4/5 stars

If You Ever See an Owl... is the first album by The Terrible Twos, a children's music alter-ego of The New Amsterdams.

== History ==
In 2005 after The Get Up Kids split up, lead singer Matt Pryor turned his focus on his other band The New Amsterdams and, primarily, his children. The main reason The Get Up Kids split up was due to Pryor's disenfranchisement with touring, and his desire to spend more time with his children. As he spent more time with them, he began writing children's songs. Eventually, he showed them to his bandmates, and they decided to perform them. Pryor's goal was to create music that would engage children, but entertain their parents as well. Eventually, they recorded their first album, If You Ever See an Owl.... After the album was complete, however, it was not released immediately due to the band members focusing on The New Amsterdams. Alongside this, they wanted artist and friend Travis Millard to illustrate a storybook to be packaged with the album. Finally, in 2005 the album was released independently, then re-released on Vagrant Records in 2007.

== Track listing ==
All tracks are written by The Terrible Twos.

If You Ever See an Owl...
No.	Title	Length
1.	"Smickey"	2:05
2.	"LadyBug"	2:09
3.	"When I Get To Eleven"	2:33
4.	"We Can All Get Along With Dinosaurs"	2:39
5.	"Heather In The Heather"	2:01
6.	"Vivian"	2:46
7.	"A Rake, A Broom, A Mop, A Shovel"	1:36
8.	"Math Stomp"	2:43
9.	"The Littlest Houdini"	1:59
10.	"Caroline"	1:46
11.	"One Plus One Is Two"	1:16
12.	"Isabella"	2:24
13.	"Pizza & Chocolate Milk"	1:48
14.	"If You Ever See An Owl..."	2:12
15.	"Grumpy Bug"	2:14

== Personnel ==
=== Band ===
- Matt Pryor – Vocals, guitar, engineering
- Bill Belzer – Drums
- Eric McCann – Upright bass
- Dustin Kinsey – Guitar
- Zach Holland – Keyboard

=== Production ===
- Alex Brahl – Engineering
- Michael Fossenkemper – Mastering
- Colin Mahoney – Mixing

=== Design ===
- Travis Millard – Artwork, packaging
