= 2 (Smoking Popes EP) =

EP by the Smoking Popes
- Released: 1993
- Recorded: 1992
- Studio: Solid Sound Studio in Hoffman Estates, Illinois
- Genre: Pop punk
- Length: 10:10

Smoking Popes chronology
Break Up (1992)	2 (1993)	Smoking Popes / Groovy Love Vibes (1993)

2 is the third EP by the Chicago-based pop punk band the Smoking Popes, released independently in 1993. It was recorded in 1992 at Solid Sound Studio in Hoffman Estates, Illinois with recording engineer Phil Bonnet, the same location and engineer used for their previous EP Break Up.

Singer and guitarist Josh Caterer has said that the lead track, "Writing a Letter", was influenced by the songwriting style of old Hollywood musicals:

I thought it would be fun to write the kind of song that might have been sung by Carmen Miranda in one of those old movies where she's wearing a hat made out of bananas. This is part of a larger experiment we've dabbled with, which is to take the classic songwriting style from Hollywood's golden age and combine it with the musical approach of a modern day punk band. I'm all for keeping up with current musical trends, but I still think the best way to learn how to write a good melody is by listening to the soundtrack from The Music Man.

All four tracks from 2 were later reissued on the compilation albums 1991–1998 (1999) and It's Been a Long Day (2010). Reviewing 1991–1998, Ari Wiznitzer of Allmusic remarked that 2 documents Josh Caterer's growth as a songwriter and guitarist, particularly in the track "Stars": "Tracks like these are the Smoking Popes at their best, as Josh Caterer's smooth vocals slide effortlessly over the band's distorted canvas."

The Smoking Popes later re-recorded "First Time" in an acoustic style for their 2008 album Stay Down.

== Track listing ==
All tracks are written by Josh Caterer.

Side A
No.	Title	Length
1.	"Writing a Letter"	1:50
2.	"Stars"	2:31

Side B
No.	Title	Length
1.	"First Time"	3:37
2.	"Under the Blanket"	2:12
Total length:		10:10

== Personnel ==
Adapted from the album's liner notes.

Smoking Popes

- Josh Caterer – vocals, guitar
- Matt Caterer – bass guitar
- Mike Felumlee – drums

Production

- Phil Bonnet – recording engineer, mix engineer
