= This Town's Disaster =

Studio album by Blackpool Lights
- Released: June 20, 2006
- Recorded: March–June 2005
- Genre: Indie rock
- Length: 37:28
- Label: Curb Appeal

Blackpool Lights chronology
Blackpool Lights EP (2005)	This Town's Disaster (2006)	Okie Baroque (2010)

Professional ratings
Review scores
Source	Rating
AbsolutePunk	87% link
Allmusic	link
Starpulse	link
The Pitch	favorable link

This Town's Disaster is the first studio album by American indie rock band Blackpool Lights. Released in June 2006, it is the first album to be released on Curb Appeal Records, the indie record label co-founded and owned by the band's lead singer/guitarist Jim Suptic. The album was recorded a year before its release in 2005, but could not be released until Curb Appeal was fully functional.

== Background ==
Much of the album was recorded in late spring/early summer 2005, during periods of time when lead singer/guitarist Jim Suptic was home in-between tour dates for the final tour of The Get Up Kids. The album was shelved, however, because the band intended for it to be the first release on Curb Appeal Records, the record label started by Jim Suptic. Once the label was up and running in mid-2006, the band released the album, gaining significant coverage from retailers such as Best Buy.

== Track listing ==
All tracks are written by Blackpool Lights.

This Town's Disaster
No.	Title	Length
1.	"This Town's Disaster"	3:28
2.	"Blue Skies"	2:40
3.	"Empty Tank"	3:34
4.	"Maybe Just Maybe"	4:18
5.	"It's Never About What It's About"	3:15
6.	"The Truth About Love"	2:52
7.	"Goodnight Romance"	3:02
8.	"Crash Sounds"	4:12
9.	"Cursed by Yourself"	3:04
10.	"Lost Without You"	3:18
11.	"Unlucky"	3:52

== Personnel ==
=== Band ===
- Jim Suptic – guitar, vocals
- J.D.Warnock – guitar, vocals, keyboards
- Billy Brimblecom – drums
- Brian Everard – bass

=== Additional musicians ===
- Chris Tolle – guitar on "Maybe Just Maybe"

=== Production ===
- Michael Fossenkemper – mastering
- Ed Rose – mixing, production
