= Blackpool Lights =

American indie rock band

- Origin: Kansas City, Missouri, U.S.
- Genres: Indie rock
- Years active: 2005–2008, 2010–present
- Label: Curb Appeal
- Members: Jim Suptic; Billy Brimblecom
- Past members: JD Warnock; Brian Everard; Thom Hoskins; Chris Tolle; Chris Clark; Jerad Meadows

Blackpool Lights is an American indie rock band founded in Kansas City, Missouri, by The Get Up Kids guitarist Jim Suptic, bassist Brian Everard, and drummer Billy Brimblecom.

== History ==
=== Formation and This Town's Disaster (2004–2006) ===
Blackpool Lights are a rock band from Kansas City, MO. featuring members of The Get Up Kids, The Belles, The Start, Buffalo Saints, and The Creature Comforts. The band was originally formed in 2004 by Jim Suptic and Billy Brimblecom, and they were joined shortly after by Brian Everard and JD Warnock. After Jim Suptic had finished recording Guilt Show with The Get Up Kids. There was a good deal of tension within the band, and Jim had written several songs that he felt didn't fit The Get Up Kids. After the band decided to break up in 2005, Blackpool Lights became his primary focus.

The band released a self-titled, self-published five-song EP in 2005. After recording an EP and an LP in Spring of 2005, Blackpool Lights spent the remainder of the year on the road headlining a tour with Lucero. Guitarist and singer JD left the band in November 2005 and was replaced by new guitarist and singer Thom Hoskins Buffalo Saints in early 2006. In May 2006, they supported Adored on their US tour. On May 8, 2006, the band signed to Curb Appeal Records, which was co-founded by Suptic and their manager Alex Brahl. The following month, they went on tour with Anberlin, Cute Is What We Aim For, and Jonezetta, leading up to the release of This Town's Disaster on June 20, 2006 (it was available for streaming nine days earlier through Alternative Press's website). The day of the release, Spin Magazine named the band the "Artist of the Day". The 2006 "This Town's Disaster Tour" traveled across the U.S., Canada and Japan. Following the tour Hoskins left to continue to pursue his own music career. Guitarist and singer Chris Tolle The Belles and The Creature Comforts became a temporary replacement when Hoskins left while the band supported Social Distortion on a U.S. tour. The band went on to support Social Distortion and Supersuckers on various tours in fall 2006.

=== Breakup (2007–2010) ===
In early 2007, Blackpool Lights supported the Ataris on their US tour. In September 2007, the band announced that Chris Clark had been added as lead guitarist and that drummer Billy Brimblecom had decided to leave the band. Both Billy and Brian are former members of the Kansas City band The Creature Comforts. Billy left the band on good terms, though no explanation for his departure was given. Jerad Meadows filled in on the drums for the band's tour with The Forecast, which occurred in September and October 2007, with Cassino and Edison Glass.

In 2007, their song "Ain't Nobody Gonna Stop Us Now" was chosen as the official anthem for the Kansas City Wizards of Major League Soccer.

Sometime in 2008 the band quietly disbanded. The last update on their MySpace was in late 2007 and their official website domain expired on December 21, 2008. Around the same time, Curb Appeal Records was also shut down, although the exact reasons are unknown. In 2009, Suptic's priorities turned to the re-united Get Up Kids, who recorded an EP entitled Simple Science before embarking on a world tour in 2010.

=== Reunion and Okie Baroque (2010–present) ===
In May 2010, the band announced via Twitter that they had re-united, and are currently in the studio recording their second album. On November 30, 2010, they released Okie Baroque on Legion of Boom records.

The song "The truth about love" was featured on the episode "The Trip" from the first season of the Netflix original show Girlboss.

== Discography ==
- Blackpool Lights EP (2005)
- This Town's Disaster (2006)
- Okie Baroque (2010)
