= Smoking Popes Tribute =

Compilation album by Double Zero Records
- Released: March 25, 2003
- Genre: Pop punk, alternative rock, indie rock, emo
- Length: 70:17
- Label: Double Zero

The Smoking Popes Tribute is a tribute album to the Chicago-based pop punk band the Smoking Popes. It was released March 25, 2003 by Double Zero Records, a label founded by former Smoking Popes drummer Mike Felumlee. Following the Smoking Popes' breakup in 1998, Double Zero had released several albums of previously recorded Smoking Popes material including 1991–1998, Live, and The Party's Over. The Smoking Popes Tribute features contributions from former members of the Smoking Popes themselves: Felumlee performs a cover of "Don't Be Afraid", while Josh and Eli Caterer perform "Do Something" with their post-Smoking Popes act Duvall. Other notable contributors to the album include Bad Astronaut, Grade, and The Ataris.

Critic Tim Sendra of Allmusic remarked that a Smoking Popes tribute album seemed incredulous at first, since the band released only a few albums and did not have much mainstream success, but noted that "the Smoking Popes were influential in a small way. Along with Weezer, they were one of the few post-Dookie bands to add more pop than punk to their mix of punk-pop and became a source of inspiration to many of the melodically inclined emo bands." He also noted the oddity of the former Smoking Popes appearing on their own tribute album, saying "Most bands or artists being tributed tend to steer clear of the process — it seems wrong somehow to be paying tribute to yourself. No matter, the record is a well-chosen and played tribute to the music and career of the Smoking Popes and fans will no doubt be thrilled."

== Track listing ==
No.	Title	Artist	Length
1.	"Megan"	Bad Astronaut	3:00
2.	"Need You Around"	Retro Morning	3:18
3.	"Let Them Die"	Death on Wednesday	1:32
4.	"Mrs. You and Me"	Blue Shade Witness	3:18
5.	"Off My Mind"	Notaword	3:29
6.	"Do Something"	Duvall	4:12
7.	"Waiting Around"	Tom Daily	3:12
8.	"Days Just Wave Goodbye"	Grade	3:44
9.	"Paul"	Saturday Supercade	3:20
10.	"Rubella"	Red Hot Valentines	2:12
11.	"End of Your Time"	Junction 18	2:43
12.	"Don't Be Afraid"	Mike Felumlee	4:12
13.	"Pretty Pathetic" "First Time" (hidden track) "Gotta Know Right Now" (hidden track)	The Ataris unlisted artist unlisted artist	12:05
Total length:			70:17
