= Con Man =

Con Man or conman may refer to:

- Confidence man, a practitioner of confidence tricks
- Con Man (film), an American crime drama film based on the life of Barry Minkow
- Con Man (web series), an American comedy web series created by Alan Tudyk
- Freelance (1971 film) (Con Man in the United States), a 1971 British thriller film starring Ian McShane
- Rob Conway (nicknamed "The Con Man"), an American professional wrestler
- The Conman, a 1998 Hong Kong action comedy film

== See also ==
- Confidence man (disambiguation)
- Con artist (disambiguation)
