= Killed or Cured =

Album by The New Amsterdams

Studio album by The New Amsterdams
- Released: April 24, 2007
- Genre: Indie rock Acoustic rock
- Length: 60:52
- Label: Vagrant Records
- Producer: Roget Moutenout; Ed Rose

The New Amsterdams chronology
Worse for the Wear (2003)	Killed or Cured (2007)	Killed or Cured Appendix (2006)

Professional ratings
Review scores
Source	Rating
AP Magazine	3.5/5 stars

Killed or Cured is the fourth album by The New Amsterdams recorded during the breakup of The Get Up Kids and released via the internet in part in 2005 and in full in 2006 on Vagrant Records.

== Writing ==
The album was originally recorded after Worse for the Wear, the band's third album. It was written primarily in 2004 after the release of The Get Up Kids album Guilt Show while that band was on its world tour. Several songs, chiefly "Wears so Thin" and "Watch the World Cave In" were written about the tensions in the band at the time that led to the group's eventual breakup. In fact, the song "Drinking in the Afternoon" was written in a hotel room during the Japan leg of the tour the night before Pryor quit the band after the tour was over. The events surrounding the album's writing led to a much darker and foreboding tone than on previous releases.

== Production ==
After The Get Up Kids went on hiatus after their 2004 world tour, Pryor turned his focus to The New Amsterdams, who started recording the first version of Killed or Cured. They initially recorded a more stripped-down acoustic version of the album, with many songs featuring only Pryor on vocals and guitar. In 2005, The Get Up Kids formally announced their breakup, and that they would be doing one final tour before splitting up permanently on June 2. Because of this Vagrant Records, the label to which both The Get Up Kids and The New Amsterdams were signed, wanted to hold off on the release of Killed or Cured, as it would reflect poorly on The Get Up Kids due to the mood of when it was written.

Soon afterward, the band released the album online for free download, including cover art, from the band's website. They also returned to the studio to re-record the album for its retail release. The new version of the album is substantially different from the original, with each song featuring the full band and, in some cases, strings and brass. This new version was produced by Ed Rose, a longtime friend who had also produced several albums by The Get Up Kids, as well as other side-projects like Reggie and the Full Effect and White Whale.

In 2006, The New Amsterdams announced that they would release the album on two discs. The first disc, called "Killed" would feature the original, stripped down version of the album, and the second disc ("Cured") would feature the new re-worked versions of the songs. The album was eventually released on April 24, 2007.

== Track listing ==
All tracks are written by The New Amsterdams.

Disc 1 (Killed)
No.	Title	Length
1.	"Wears So Thin"	3:59
2.	"Your Red Hand"	2:24
3.	"Watch The World Cave In"	2:25
4.	"Drinking In The Afternoon"	2:51
5.	"Maybe I'm A Fool"	3:18
6.	"Heaven Sent"	2:17
7.	"Full Thunder Moon"	2:40
8.	"Has Anyone Seen My Wings"	1:58
9.	"Just So Over You"	2:02
10.	"Strangled By The Thought"	4:00

Disc 2 (Cured)
No.	Title	Length
1.	"Wears So Thin"	4:23
2.	"Your Red Hand"	3:02
3.	"Watch The World Cave In"	3:17
4.	"Drinking In The Afternoon"	3:04
5.	"Maybe I'm A Fool"	4:13
6.	"Heaven Sent"	3:04
7.	"Full Thunder Moon"	2:23
8.	"Has Anyone Seen My Wings"	3:12
9.	"Just So Over You"	2:23
10.	"Strangled By The Thought"	4:09

== Personnel ==
=== Band ===
- Matt Pryor - Vocals, Guitar
- Bill Belzer - Drums
- Eric McCann - Upright Bass
- Dustin Kinsey - Guitar
- Zach Holland - Keyboard

=== Production ===
- Roger Moutenot - Producer, Mixing
- Colin Mahoney - Engineer, Mixing
- Ed Rose - Engineer

=== Design ===
- Geoff McCann - Artwork
- Matthew Doyle - Artwork

== Killed or Cured Appendix ==
Killed or Cured Appendix

EP by The New Amsterdams
- Released: 2006
- Genre: Indie rock Acoustic rock
- Length: 17:27
- Label: Self-released

The New Amsterdams chronology
Killed or Cured (2005)	Killed or Cured Appendix (2006)	Story Like a Scar (2006)

In 2006, the band released Killed or Cured Appendix, a six-song EP composed of B-sides left over from the Killed or Cured recording sessions on their website. It included new songs, alternate takes, and a cover. Some were full-band songs, whereas others were just demos that Matt Pryor recorded on his own.

=== Killed or Cured Appendix track listing ===
Killed or Cured Appendix
No.	Title	Length
1.	"Dear Lover"	3:01
2.	"The Ballad of Mike and Beth"	3:33
3.	"Heaven Sent (Demo)"	3:27
4.	"Too Many of a Good Thing"	3:00
5.	"Suit Sacrifice"	2:10
6.	"Old Enough to Know Bitter"	2:36
