= Get Fired =

Studio album by the Smoking Popes
- Released: 1993
- Recorded: 1993 at Sonic Iguana Studios in Lafayette, Indiana
- Genre: Punk rock
- Length: 25:20
- Label: Johann's Face (JFR 011)

Smoking Popes chronology
| Smoking Popes / Groovy Love Vibes (1993) | Get Fired (1993) | Born to Quit (1994) |

Get Fired is the debut album by the Chicago-based pop punk band the Smoking Popes, released in 1993 by Johann's Face Records. It was recorded in 1993 at Sonic Iguana Studios in Lafayette, Indiana with recording engineer Mass Giorgini. The raw production and punk rock sound of the album are in contrast to the higher production values and more pop-leaning sound of the band's later works.

Tim DiGravina of Allmusic gave Get Fired three stars out of five, calling it "a fine document of a great, somewhat under appreciated band that would later scale higher peaks." He calls "That's Where I Come In" "the real gem" of the album: "It revolves around a brilliant hook and a sadly sweet motif of a girlfriend who just wants 'to be somebody's baby.' Vocalist Josh Caterer sounds morose and overjoyed at the same time, happy to be with a girl he loves, but unhappy that where he comes in is as a crutch." DiGravina also notes "Off My Mind" and "Days Just Wave Goodbye" as more aggressive tracks than the band's usual material, comparing the former to the Deftones and the latter to The Police and Joy Division.

The Smoking Popes re-recorded the songs "Let's Hear It for Love" and "Can't Find It" for their 1997 album Destination Failure. Remarking on the differences between the recordings, DiGravina notes that the Get Fired version of "Can't Find It" is faster and that "It's hard to say which version of the song is better; this raw, punk sounding recording or the more-produced version which was to come."

All nine tracks from Get Fired were reissued on the compilation album 1991–1998 in 1999, the original album having gone out of print. Reviewing the compilation, Ari Wiznitzer remarked that Get Fired demonstrated growth in Josh Caterer's songwriting and guitar playing, citing "Let's Hear It for Love" as an example: "Tracks like these are the Smoking Popes at their best, as Josh Caterer's smooth vocals slide effortlessly over the band's distorted canvas."

Several of the songs from Get Fired were covered by other artists for the 2003 Smoking Popes Tribute album. Death on Wednesday covered "Let Them Die", former Smoking Popes drummer Mike Felumlee performed "Don't Be Afraid", Notaword covered "Off My Mind", and Grade contributed a version of "Days Just Wave Goodbye". Alkaline Trio also covered "Off My Mind" for a split single with the Smoking Popes in 2006.

In 2009 Asian Man Records announced plans to reissue a remastered version of Get Fired. It was remastered by Carl Saff and released on October 12, 2010.

== Track listing ==
All tracks are written by Josh Caterer.

Side A
| No. | Title | Length |
|---|---|---|
| 1. | "Let's Hear It for Love" | 3:30 |
| 2. | "That's Where I Come In" | 3:33 |
| 3. | "Let Them Die" | 1:31 |
| 4. | "Double Fisted Love" | 3:06 |

Side B
| No. | Title | Length |
|---|---|---|
| 1. | "Don't Be Afraid" | 3:14 |
| 2. | "Can't Find It" | 2:05 |
| 3. | "Off My Mind" | 2:32 |
| 4. | "Not That Kind of Girlfriend" | 1:40 |
| 5. | "Days Just Wave Goodbye" | 4:09 |
| Total length: | | 25:20 |

== Personnel ==
=== Band ===
- Josh Caterer – vocals, guitar
- Eli Caterer – guitar
- Matt Caterer – bass guitar
- Mike Felumlee – drums

=== Production ===
- Mass Giorgini – recording engineer
- Carl Saff – remastering (2010 re-release)
