= May Day (Matt Pryor album) =

Studio album by Matt Pryor
- Released: January 24, 2012
- Recorded: May 2011
- Genre: Acoustic rock
- Length: 30:24
- Label: Self-released
- Producer: Matt Pryor

Matt Pryor chronology
Confidence Man (2008)	May Day (2012)	Still, There's a Light (2012)

May Day is the second solo album released by The Get Up Kids lead singer Matt Pryor. Released in early 2012, the album was funded entirely through the crowdfunding website Kickstarter.

== Recording ==
In early 2011, after a world tour with The Get Up Kids supporting their album There Are Rules, lead singer Matt Pryor decided to write and record a second solo album to follow up 2008's Confidence Man. Since the release of his first record, Pryor's longstanding relationship with Vagrant Records had come to an end, and he decided to release the album independently.

On May 2, 2011, Pryor launched a Kickstarter campaign to fund the production and release of the album, entitled "May Day." Pryor wrote and recorded the album on his own in his home studio concurrently with the month-long campaign. Much like the last Get Up Kids album, May Day was recorded entirely on analog equipment. The funding campaign launched with a goal of raising $10,000 to fund the entire release of the album, but ended up raising more than double that by the end of the campaign.

== Release ==
Professional ratings
Review scores
Source	Rating
Alter the Press	4/5 stars
Alternative Press	4/5 stars
Consequence of Sound	4/5 stars

May Day was released first to Kickstarter backers in late 2011, and released wide on January 24, 2012. The album was released on compact disc, 12-inch vinyl and digital download.

== Track listing ==
All tracks are written by Matt Pryor.

May Day
No.	Title	Length
1.	"Don't Let the Bastards Get You Down"	1:57
2.	"The Lies Are Keeping Me Here"	2:30
3.	"Where Do We Go From Here"	2:05
4.	"Like a Professional"	2:41
5.	"As If I Could Fall In Love With You Again"	2:11
6.	"Polish the Broken Glass"	2:54
7.	"Unhappy Is the Only Happy You'll Ever Be"	2:46
8.	"As Lies Goes... This One is Beautiful"	3:03
9.	"Your New Favorite"	2:33
10.	"You Won't Get Any Blood From Me"	1:54
11.	"I Was A Witness"	3:08
12.	"What My Tired Eyes Would View"	2:46
