= Billy Brimblecom =

American drummer

- Born: January 8, 1977 (age 49); Kansas City, Missouri U.S.
- Genres: Alternative rock, indie rock, power pop
- Instrument: Drums
- Years active: 1984–present
- Labels: Curb Appeal, Noisome, DU&MU

Billy Brimblecom, Jr. is a drummer from Kansas City, Missouri.

== Personal life ==
Billy Brimblecom is the CEO of Steps of Faith Foundation, an organization that is dedicated to providing prosthetic care, hope, and comfort to amputees needing financial support.

== Music career ==
Brimblecom began playing the drums at age 11. In 1995 at the age of 18, Brimblecom joined the Lawrence, Kansas-based heavy rock band Stick who released 2 albums. Their first album, 1993's Heavy Bag was released by Arista records.

=== The Creature Comforts ===
In 1997, Brimblecom formed the rootsy, power-pop band, The Creature Comforts with songwriter Christopher Tolle. Brimblecom began frequent tours of America and The Creature Comforts released 2 full-length albums. The Creature Comforts reunited in June 2009 after a 7-year break to play one show in Kansas City before Billy moved to Nashville, TN.

=== The Start ===
In 2003, Brimblecom joined the Los Angeles-based dark, new wave pop band The START. The START did extensive tours of America as well as supporting The Offspring in the U.S. and U.K. He recorded The START's 2004 Nitro Records release "Initiation".

=== Blackpool Lights ===
In the fall of 2004, Brimblecom teamed up with Jim Suptic of The Get Up Kids to form Blackpool Lights. Brimblecom recorded Blackpool Lights' 2006 Curb Appeal Records release "This Town's Disaster" . In early 2005 Brimblecom learned he had a form of cancer in his leg called Ewing's sarcoma. This resulted in his left leg being amputated above the knee. After 13 rounds of chemotherapy and a few months of rehab, Brimblecom re-joined Blackpool Lights and began touring (on the drums with a prosthetic leg) in March 2006. Brimblecom and the band did extensive tours of the U.S., Canada and Japan as well as support slots for Social Distortion, Anberlin, Angels and Airwaves.

Brimblecom parted ways with Blackpool Lights in 2007. He has since been doing session work with producer/songwriter Don Chaffer (of Waterdeep). He has had write ups in Modern Drummer and Relevant Magazine as well as Kansas City's The Pitch.

=== Nashville ===
In July 2009, Billy and his wife relocated to Nashville, TN. to pursue more studio and road work. Billy has continued to work with Don Chaffer, recording new material with his band Waterdeep. He has also been doing session work and production with friend and bandmate (from The Khrusty Brothers and The Klangs), Greg LaFollette.

== Discography ==
=== With The Creature Comforts ===
- Politics of Pop - (1998)
- Teaching Little Fingers to Play - (2000)

=== With Blackpool Lights ===
- Blackpool Lights - (2005)
- This Town's Disaster - (2006)
