= 8mm (band) =

American rock band

- Origin: Los Angeles, California, United States
- Genres: Trip hop; pop rock; hard rock
- Years active: 2004–present
- Label: ChelseaGirl Records
- Members: Juliette Beavan; Sean Beavan; Jonathan Radtke
- Website: Official Site

8mm is a rock band from Los Angeles, California. 8mm was started by Sean Beavan (who formerly worked with bands such as Marilyn Manson, Nine Inch Nails and God Lives Underwater), and his wife Juliette Beavan. 8mm has toured internationally in countries such as the United Kingdom and Chile, as well as across the US and in parts of Canada. They released two albums before moving to ChelseaGirl Records. Their debut, appropriately titled Opener, was released independently. Their second, Songs to Love and Die By, was released on Curb Appeal Records. Since then, 8MM has released three albums with ChelseaGirl Records: On a Silent Night (2008), Love and the Apocalypse (2010) and Between the Devil and Two Black Hearts (2012). In 2019, they released an independent EP, titled Heart-Shaped Hell.

8mm was featured in the popular television show One Tree Hill twice with their songs "No Way Back" and "Forever and Ever Amen". The latter was featured in the episode "Songs to Love and Die By", titled after their second album. They also remade a version of Carly Simon's "Nobody Does It Better" which was used in the film Mr. & Mrs. Smith. Their song "Liar" was featured on Grey's Anatomy and on the season finale of Dirt. MTV used the track "Give It Up" on its hit show Road Rules and "Never Enough" for a preview of an upcoming episode of The Real World: Sydney. Their song "Around the Sun" from their album "Between the Devil and Two Black Hearts" also appeared in Canadian supernatural series Lost Girl, season 3 episode 2. Additionally "Forever and Ever Amen" was used for the second episode of CBS's Moonlight.

== Discography ==
Release date	Title	Type	Record label
2004	Opener	EP	–
2006	Songs to Love and Die By	LP	Curb Appeal Records
2008	On a Silent Night (The Christmas EP)	EP	ChelseaGirl Records
2010	Love and the Apocalypse	EP	ChelseaGirl Records
2012	Between the Devil and Two Black Hearts	LP	ChelseaGirl Records
2019	Heart-Shaped Hell	EP	
2024	Black Cat	LP	
