= Born to Quit =

Studio album by the Smoking Popes
- Released: 1994
- Recorded: 1994 at Solid Sound Studios in Hoffman Estates, Illinois
- Genre: Pop-punk; punk rock; emo
- Length: 28:04
- Label: Johann's Face, Capitol
- Producer: Phil Bonnet

Smoking Popes chronology
Get Fired (1993)	Born to Quit (1994)	Destination Failure (1997)

Singles from Born to Quit
- 1. "Rubella" Released: 1995; 2. "Need You Around" Released: 1995

Born to Quit is the second album by the Chicago-based pop punk band the Smoking Popes, originally released in 1994 by Johann's Face Records and re-released in 1995 through Capitol Records. It became their only release to chart, reaching #37 on Billboard's Top Heatseekers chart, partly on the strength of the single "Need You Around" which reached #35 on the Modern Rock Tracks chart.

== Background ==
Johann's Face Records, an independent record label in Chicago, had released the Smoking Popes' debut album Get Fired in 1993. For their second album, Born to Quit, the band returned to Solid Sound Studios in Hoffman Estates, Illinois to record with Phil Bonnet, the same location and recording engineer used for their EPs Break Up (1992) and 2 (1993). Bonnet also mixed and produced the album.

Born to Quit was released in 1994 through Johann's Face, and the song "Need You Around" soon received radio play on Chicago's Q101 and Los Angeles' KROQ. The band then signed to major label Capitol Records, who re-released Born to Quit on July 7, 1995. Singles were released for "Rubella" and "Need You Around", and the latter song was included in the soundtrack of the film Clueless. It became the only Smoking Popes song to chart, reaching #35 on Billboard's Modern Rock Tracks. Several other songs from the album were also used in film soundtracks: "Lucky Day" was used in Tommy Boy, "Mrs. You and Me" in Angus, and "Gotta Know Right Now" in Boys. To support the album the Smoking Popes toured with the Goo Goo Dolls, Tripping Daisy, Jawbreaker, Dinosaur Jr., and Morrissey. Born to Quit became the only Smoking Popes album ever to chart, reaching #37 on Billboard's Top Heatseekers.

In 2009 Asian Man Records announced plans to reissue a remastered version of Born to Quit.

== Reception ==
Stephen Thomas Erlewine of Allmusic gave Born to Quit 4½ stars out of 5, saying that "the thing that sets [the Smoking Popes] apart from the standard four-piece alternative hard rock outfit is not only their pop sense, it's how the lead vocalist uncannily recalls the quavering, self-absorbed tone of Morrissey. Combined with their gift for hooks, it makes for a sound that is familiar, yet surprisingly distinctive." Morrissey himself later called the album "extraordinary, the most lovable thing I'd heard in years."

Several artists covered songs from Born to Quit for the 2003 Smoking Popes Tribute album: Retro Morning covered "Need You Around", Blue Shade Witness performed "Mrs. You and Me", and the Red Hot Valentines provided a rendition of "Rubella".

== Track listing ==
All tracks are written by Josh Caterer, except where noted.

Born to Quit track listing
No.	Title	Length
1.	"Midnight Moon"	2:11
2.	"Rubella"	2:03
3.	"Gotta Know Right Now"	2:37
4.	"Mrs. You and Me"	3:35
5.	"Just Broke Up"	2:04
6.	"My Lucky Day"	2:06
7.	"Need You Around"	3:43
8.	"Can't Help the Teardrops (From Getting Cried)"	2:54
9.	"Adena"	1:47
10.	"On the Shoulder" (Josh Caterer, Eli Caterer)	5:04
Total length:		28:04

== Personnel ==
=== Band ===
- Josh Caterer – vocals, guitar
- Eli Caterer – guitar
- Matt Caterer – bass guitar
- Mike Felumlee – drums

=== Additional musicians ===
- Lynette White – backing vocals on "Rubella"

=== Production ===
- Phil Bonnet – recording engineer, mix engineer, producer
- Markus Greiner – design
- David Houle – band photos
- Brekken Garner – cover photo
