= Matt Pryor (musician) =

American musician (born 1978)

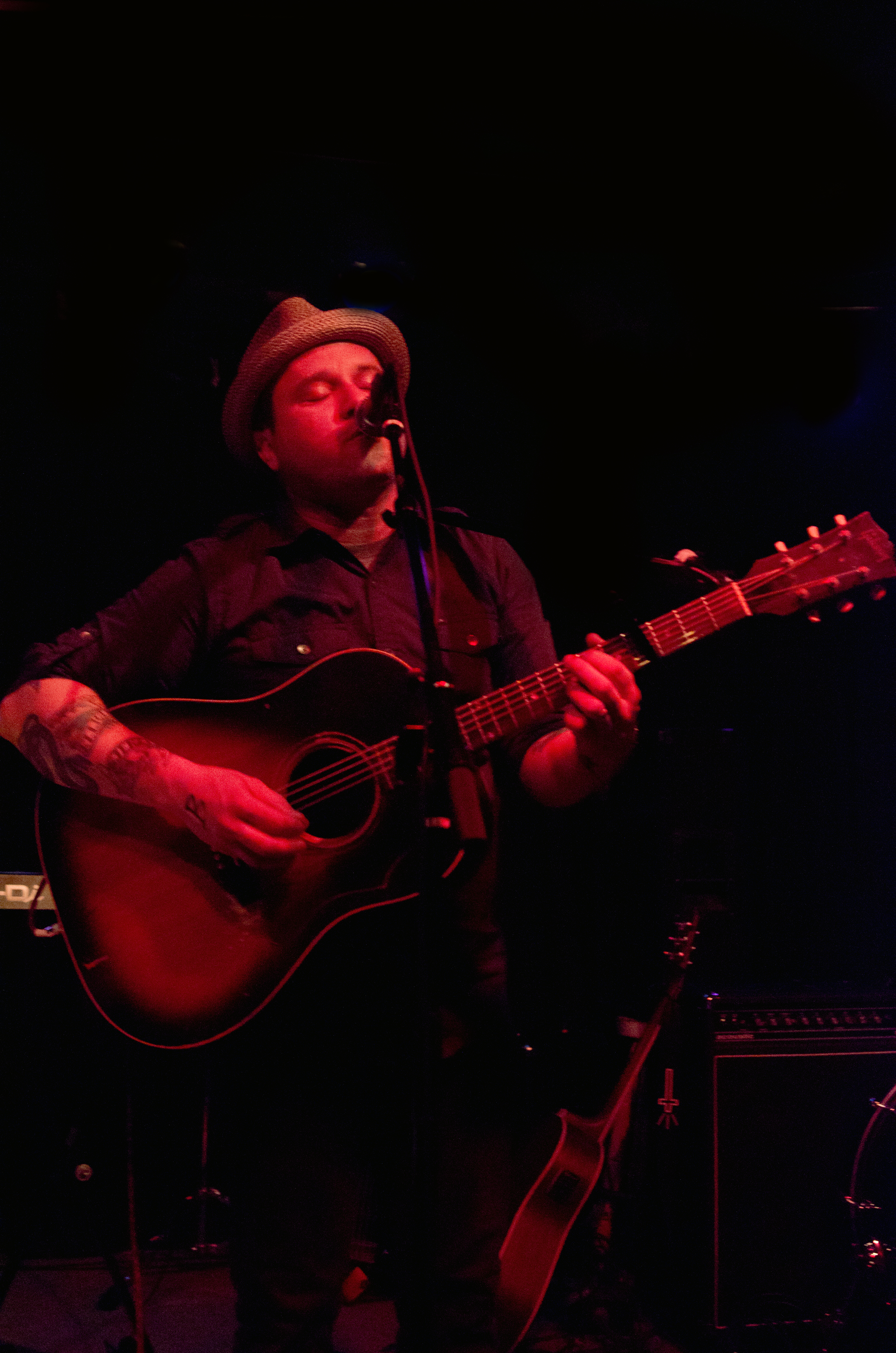
- Pryor performing live in Boston

Background information
- Born: Matthew Pryor; March 16, 1978 (age 48); Kansas City, Missouri, U.S.
- Genres: Indie rock; alternative rock; emo; pop punk; acoustic rock
- Instruments: Vocals, guitar
- Years active: 1995–present
- Labels: Vagrant; Doghouse; Curb Appeal; Big Scary Monsters; Alcopop!; Equal Vision Records; Rory Records
- Member of: The Get Up Kids; The New Amsterdams; The Terrible Twos; Lasorda; Radar State
- Website: thegetupkids.com

Matthew Pryor (born March 16, 1978) is an American musician who lives in Lawrence, Kansas. He is best known as a founding member and the lead vocalist of The Get Up Kids, one of the most influential acts of the second-wave emo music scene.

== Early life ==
Matt Pryor was born in Kansas City, Missouri on March 16, 1978. He attended St Peter's Elementary and Bishop Miege High School, where he met his future wife. Pryor was raised Catholic, but described his experience with the church as "bigoted, misogynist & homophobic."

Pryor's father played accordion when he was young, but otherwise describes his family as "not particularly musical." He described himself as a "young metalhead in grade school," citing Guns N' Roses and Mötley Crüe as early influences. Those bands, along with the likes of Metallica and The Misfits led him to discover the Washington, D.C. hardcore scene. Pryor was especially inspired by the DIY ethics of bands like Minor Threat, Fugazi and Descendents, which led him to get involved in the local Kansas City underground music scene.

== Career ==
=== Early years ===
Matt Pryor's first involvement with music began as a drummer & guitarist with the post-punk band Take a Joke. The band released one cassette, entitled Bicycles for Afghanistan, a reference to a chapter from Cat's Cradle by Kurt Vonnegut. After that was a stint with an avant-garde noise rock band named Secular Theme, reflecting later "I used the guitar more as a weapon of torture rather than something to write melodies on."

After Secular Theme, Pryor began to drift more toward pop punk, joining the band Secret Decoder Ring, where he met future Get Up Kids collaborator Jim Suptic. After the dissolution of that band in 1995, Suptic recruited his childhood friend Rob Pope and Nathan Shay, who he had recently met in art school to form The Get Up Kids.

=== The Get Up Kids (1995–2005) ===
After getting the attention of major labels with their first album, the Get Up Kids found widespread success and acclaim with the release of Something to Write Home About in 1999. It was around this time that he began releasing solo acoustic material under the moniker The New Amsterdams. While making music with The Get Up Kids, Pryor began to gravitate toward different sounds in his free time, listening to Steve Earle and Richard Buckner. "I wanted to try that, just to see if I could do something that wasn't so dependent on being incredibly loud." Over time, the project began to grow in scope as the sound expanded on later albums, incorporating a full band, and at times a pedal steel player or string and horn sections.

While touring to support the band's fourth album Guilt Show, Pryor had a breakdown in Australia brought on from the stresses from being away from his newborn first child. "My daughter was 2 years old, and my oldest son was about 3 months away from being born, and I was in a really dark headspace about leaving," he reflected years later. "I needed a break just to be at home... ultimately that's not what everyone else wanted. It was killing me." After quitting the band temporarily, the group decided to disband after one final tour the following year. It was during this time that he wrote Story Like a Scar, inspired largely by the band's troubles.

=== The Get Up Kids breakup (2005–2009) ===
After the breakup of The Get Up Kids, Pryor's musical focus shifted to The New Amsterdams, which had now become a full three-piece band. Pryor had two more children, and began writing children's music. His first children's album, If You Ever See an Owl...—recorded with The New Amsterdams under the moniker The Terrible Twos—was released in 2006.

In 2008, Pryor announced that The New Amsterdams (which had by that time grown into a full band) would be going on hiatus, allowing him to pursue a solo career. The first album released under Pryor's name was Confidence Man, released later that year on Vagrant Records. After a brief tour with Kevin Devine in support of the album.

=== The Get Up Kids Reunion (2009–present) ===
it was announced that The Get Up Kids would be reuniting after a surprise show in their native Kansas City.

In 2009, between tours supporting the ten-year anniversary of Something to Write Home About, The Get Up Kids entered the studio with longtime producer Ed Rose to record new material, resulting in the Simple Science EP and the band's fifth album There Are Rules.

After There Are Rules, The Get Up Kids went on a brief hiatus during which time Pryor looked to exit the music industry, taking up jobs as a farmhand and working out of a Lawrence, Kansas food truck.

Pryor's exit from the music industry was short-lived; In 2011, he formed the supergroup Lasorda with members of fun., White Whale and Kevin Devine's Goddamn Band, writing and recording their new album remotely in different studios across the country. That same year, he also ran a Kickstarter campaign to fund a second solo album, entitled May Day. The project was funded, and the album was released in January 2012, along with the companion album Still, There's a Light.

In 2013, Pryor released Outroduction, a collection of B-Sides meant to serve as the final release by The New Amsterdams. In 2018, Pryor teamed up with Get Up Kids bandmate Jim Suptic and Josh Berwanger of The Anniversary to form Radar State, a punk side-project that focused on fast, stripped-down songs made while waiting for the other members of the Get Up Kids schedules to free up.

=== Podcasting ===
In 2012, Pryor launched "Nothing to Write Home About," an interview podcast featuring one-on-one interviews with Pryor's musician friends. James Dewees was a regular guest on this podcast and they later announced plans to release a collaborative EP on vinyl/digital formats together. This self-titled EP was released on October 1, 2013.

In 2021, it was announced that Vagrant Records would begin releasing "Vagrant Records: 25 Years on the Streets," a retrospective podcast chronicling the history of the label from its inception to its lasting legacy, hosted and produced by Matt Pryor.

== Discography ==
=== with The Get Up Kids ===
- Four Minute Mile (1997)
- Something to Write Home About (1999)
- On a Wire (2002)
- Guilt Show (2004)
- Simple Science (2010)
- There Are Rules (2011)
- Kicker (2018)
- Problems (2019)

=== with Reggie and the Full Effect ===
- Greatest Hits 1984-1987 (1998)
- Promotional Copy (2000)

=== with The New Amsterdams ===
- Never You Mind (2000)
- Para Toda Vida (2002)
- Worse for the Wear (2003)
- Killed or Cured (2005)
- Story Like a Scar (2006)
- At the Foot of My Rival (2007)
- Outroduction (2013)

=== with The Terrible Twos ===
- If You Ever See an Owl... (2007)
- Jerzy the Giant (2008)

=== Solo ===
- Confidence Man (2008)
- May Day (2012)
- Still, There's a Light (2012)
- Wrist Slitter (2013)
- Nine Forty Live (2014)
- Memento Mori (2017)
- May Day Companion [EP] (2020)
- The Salton Sea (2025)

Music videos

- "Kinda Go to Pieces" (2014)

=== With Lasorda ===
- "Lasorda" (2012)

=== With James Dewees ===
- Matt Pryor and James Dewees (2013)

=== With Radar State ===
- "Strays" (2019)
