= The Party's Over (Smoking Popes album) =

Studio album by Smoking Popes
- Released: 2003
- Recorded: 1998
- Genre: Pop punk
- Label: Double Zero Records
- Producer: Phil Bonnet

Smoking Popes chronology
Destination Failure (1997)	The Party's Over (2003)	Stay Down (2008)

Professional ratings
Review scores
Source	Rating
AllMusic	3/5 stars
Chicago Sun-Times	2.5/4 stars
Punknews.org	4.5/5 stars

The Party's Over is an album by pop rock group the Smoking Popes. It is a collection of ten cover tunes that was recorded in 1998 as a perfunctory effort to fulfill the Popes' part of their recording contract with Capitol Records. The album was rejected by the label, and the band was released from their contract as they had hoped; the album was released five years later, in 2003, by Double Zero Records.

== Critical reception ==
The album received a lukewarm review from Tim DiGravina of AllMusic. Gravina posed the question of whether the album was worth waiting the five years it took to release it, and wrote that "while the answer is mostly no, there's still enough vigor and crackle on display to pump up the diehards." PopMatters wrote that as "uneven as it is, the record is a worthy epitaph to yet another band that went away far too soon." The Daily Herald wrote that "on this vaulted swan song of covers, the band exposes Judy Garland and Patsy Cline as the true predecessors to emo heartbreakers like Dashboard Confessional."

== Track listing ==
1. Seven Lonely Days – 2:57 (Marshall Brown/Alden Shuman/Earl Shuman)
2. Valentine – 2:32 (Willie Nelson)
3. Bewitched, Bothered and Bewildered – 3:29 (Lorenz Hart/Richard Rodgers)
4. The Party's Over – 3:26 (Betty Comden/Adolph Green/Julie Styne)
5. Farther Along – 3:36 (W.B. Stevens)
6. Zing! Went the Strings of My Heart – 2:53 (James F. Hanley)
7. Stormy Weather – 4:38 (Harold Arlen/Ted Koehler)
8. Wake Up Crying – 3:04 (Burt Bacharach/Hal David)
9. You'll Never Walk Alone – 2:45 (Oscar Hammerstein II/Richard Rodgers)
10. Why Me – 2:50 (Kris Kristofferson)
