= Destination Failure =

Studio album by the Smoking Popes
- Released: August 26, 1997
- Recorded: 1997 at Chicago Recording Company in Chicago and Conway Studios in Hollywood
- Genre: Pop-punk; power pop
- Length: 48:24
- Label: Capitol
- Producer: Jerry Finn

Smoking Popes chronology
Born to Quit (1994)	Destination Failure (1997)	The Party's Over (2003)

Singles from Destination Failure
- 1. "I Know You Love Me" Released: 1997; 2. "Before I'm Gone" Released: 1997

Destination Failure is the third album by the Chicago-based pop punk band the Smoking Popes, released August 26, 1997 by Capitol Records. It was their second, and final, album for Capitol and their last before their nearly seven-year hiatus; their covers album The Party's Over was rejected by Capitol and the Smoking Popes disbanded in December 1998, reuniting in November 2005 to record At Metro. Destination Failure was not as successful as the band's previous album Born to Quit; it failed to chart despite the release a single and music video for "I Know You Love Me". The album was recorded at the Chicago Recording Company and at Conway Studios in Hollywood with producer Jerry Finn and recording engineer Phil Bonnet. Bonnet had worked with the band since early in their career, engineering and producing their EPs Break Up and 2 as well as Born to Quit.

The songs "Let's Hear It for Love" and "Can't Find It" are new recordings of songs from the Get Fired. The Destination Failure version of "Can't Find It" is slower than the original version. "I Know You Love Me" references singer and guitarist Josh Caterer's newfound interest in Christianity, while "You Spoke to Me" refers to Blake Schwarzenbach of Jawbreaker and Jets to Brazil, who the Smoking Popes had toured with. "Paul" is about enduring an ex-lover's affection for her new man. Destination Failure also includes a cover version of "Pure Imagination", a song from the musical film Willy Wonka & the Chocolate Factory.

== Reception ==
Jack Rabid of Allmusic gave Destination Failure three stars out of five, saying that the band "humbly offer[s] a singular style that is actually power pop in the early-'70s and early-'80s tradition — from the young Todd Rundgren to the Fabulous Poodles [...] With a singer in Josh Caterer who can make the most melancholic, fretting passage seem like a whistling, carefree, Willy Wonka-kissed day (and who still sounds like a cross between XTC's Andy Partridge and Gilbert O'Sullivan) and a band who is gleeful, but not in a churlish-youthful way, Smoking Popes are one of the most deceptively pleasant-sounding bands going." Tyler Barrett of Punknews.org gave the album a perfect score of five stars, calling it "a masterpiece. Caterer's songwriting dives head-first into the core of humanity, and the music is as good as the best pop-punk you've ever heard."

Several artists covered songs from Destination Failure for the 2003 Smoking Popes Tribute album: Bad Astronaut covered "Megan", Saturday Supercade performed "Paul", Junction 18 contributed a rendition of "End of Your Time", and The Ataris covered "Pretty Pathetic" (The Ataris version had previously been released on their EP All You Can Ever Learn Is What You Already Know). Dashboard Confessional also covered "Pretty Pathetic" on 2007's The Wire Tapes Vol. 1. Bayside covered "Megan" on their 2005 live acoustic EP, featuring Josh Caterer singing with them.

== Track listing ==
All tracks are written by Josh Caterer, except where noted.

No.	Title	Length
1.	"Star Struck One"	1:58
2.	"No More Smiles" (Ken Knowka, Josh Caterer)	2:31
3.	"I Know You Love Me"	3:16
4.	"You Spoke to Me"	3:18
5.	"Paul"	3:22
6.	"Can't Find It"	3:05
7.	"Capital Cristine"	2:04
8.	"Before I'm Gone"	3:38
9.	"Megan"	3:10
10.	"Let's Hear It for Love"	3:55
11.	"Pure Imagination" (Leslie Bricusse, Anthony Newley; originally performed by Gene Wilder in Willy Wonka & the Chocolate Factory)	2:42
12.	"I Was Right"	3:27
13.	"They Lied"	0:54
14.	"End of Your Time"	2:34
15.	"Pretty Pathetic"	4:08
16.	"Follow the Sound"	4:22
17.	"Stormy Weather (2018 Vinyl bonus track)"
18.	"I Was Wrong (2018 Vinyl bonus track)"
19.	"Usually Don't Know (2018 Vinyl bonus track)"
Total length:		48:24

== Personnel ==
=== Band ===
- Josh Caterer – vocals, guitar
- Eli Caterer – guitar
- Matt Caterer – bass guitar
- Mike Felumlee – drums

=== Production ===
- Jerry Finn – producer, mix engineer
- Phil Bonnet – recording engineer
- Ron Lowe and Bill Kinsley – assistant engineers

=== Artwork ===
- Tommy Steele – art direction
- Dana Arnett, Ken Fox, and Jason Eplawy – design
- Nitin Vadukul – Photography
- Doug Aitken – illustration
