= At the Foot of My Rival =

At The Foot Of My Rival

Studio album by The New Amsterdams
- Released: September 25, 2007
- Genre: Acoustic rock
- Label: Elmar / Curb Appeal Records
- Producer: Unknown

The New Amsterdams chronology
Story Like a Scar (2006)	At The Foot Of My Rival (2007)	The Companion of My Rival (2008)

Professional ratings
Review scores
Source	Rating
Allmusic	4.0/5 stars
AbsolutePunk.net	(76%)
Starpulse	3.5/5 stars

At The Foot Of My Rival is the sixth album by The New Amsterdams released on September 25, 2007. It was released on CD, download and 180g vinyl, and is the first New Amsterdams album to be released on Curb Appeal Records.

== Track listing ==
All tracks are written by The New Amsterdams.

At the Foot of My Rival
No.	Title	Length
1.	"Revenge"	1:44
2.	"Wait"	3:02
3.	"Fountain of Youth"	2:56
4.	"This Day Is Done"	3:00
5.	"Without a Sound (Eleanor)"	3:21
6.	"Silverlake"	3:07
7.	"Lost Long Shot"	2:53
8.	"Hughes"	3:11
9.	"Beacon in Beige"	2:43
10.	"Story Like a Scar"	3:13
11.	"Fortunate Fool"	2:48
12.	"Lay on the Rails"	4:16
13.	"Drunk or Dead"	3:03
14.	"Blood on the Floor"	2:53

== Reception ==
"...The New Amsterdams wouldn’t be The New Amsterdams if it wasn’t for songs like “Wait” where Pryor sounds as good as he ever sounded.[...] Unfortunately not all of the songs on here are as good as this one or as “Fountain of Youth” but overall “At The Foot Of My Rival” is yet another solid release by a great songwriter." - Punkrocktheory

"Matt Pryor and The New Amsterdams are back with relatively soft, yet pleasant, melodies on their sixth album, At the Foot of My Rival. Though not exactly a priceless discovery, the group experiments with raw sounds (the album was mostly a home recording) and varied instrumentation that separates Rival from its predecessors." - Americansongwriter

== Personnel ==
- Matt Pryor - Vocals, Guitar
- Bill Belzer - Drums
- Eric McCann - Upright Bass
- Dustin Kinsey - Guitar
- Zach Holland - Keyboard
- Hannah Kendle - Vocals
- Chris Leopold - Vocals
- Colin Mahoney - Engineer, Mixing
- Matthew Doyle - Layout Design
- Geoff McCann - Artwork
