= This Is Only a Test =

Studio album by the Smoking Popes
- Released: March 15, 2011
- Recorded: 2010
- Genres: Pop-punk; pop rock
- Length: 36:58
- Label: Asian Man
- Producers: Matt Allison, Smoking Popes

Smoking Popes chronology
It's Been a Long Day (2010)	This Is Only a Test (2011)

This Is Only a Test is the sixth studio album by the Chicago-based pop punk band the Smoking Popes, released March 15, 2011, through Asian Man Records. It was produced by Matt Allison and is their first album with drummer Neil Hennessy, who joined the band in 2008. It is a concept album, with all of the songs written from the perspective of a single teenage boy dealing with the growing pains of adolescence. Singer, guitarist, and songwriter Josh Caterer described it as "kind of a concept album about a teenage life. All of the songs are written from the point of view of a high school student, and they explore aspects of teenage life. This would be [about] a contemporary teenager. It's not specifically autobiographical of my high school experience. Obviously, those things are incorporated into what I write, but I tried to create a character who is the protagonist in these songs."

== Concept and writing ==
This Is Only a Test explores themes of identity, musical aspirations, love, and teen suicide. The idea to write a concept album about teenage life came to Caterer while thinking about successful contemporary bands who cited the Smoking Popes as an influence:

I was thinking about some of the younger bands who claim Smoking Popes as one of their influences and have gone onto become very successful in this generation. I [thought about] how their music is different than ours, and what they're doing differently than what we've done. I realized that one of the things I've never done is write from an explicitly teenage point of view--even when I was a teenager. I was always trying to pretend like I was older. I was trying to emulate the kind of perspective and sophistication of the older generation. It occurred to me that it would be funny if now, while I'm in my late 30s, I would actually start writing songs from a teenage perspective. As soon as that thought occurred to me, I got ideas for, like, the first five songs on the record. They just sort of started coming to me. So I went home and started writing and they just came out. That became the beginning of the next record.

With the idea in place to write from a teenage perspective, "the individual songs came really quickly", said Caterer, "I wrote a song a day for five days. That's half the album in less than a week. I never write that fast! Each song stands alone as a snapshot from this kid's life. The story doesn't unfold like a narrative. It's more like a collage." According to Caterer, the album's main character is not autobiographical, but "definitely a creation. He's not me. Well...he's similar to me, but he's not limited by the realities of my own experience. I created a character that basically has the same view of the world that I had when I was in high school, but he’s his own person and he does some things that I never did."

== Recording and promotion ==
This Is Only a Test was recorded at Atlas Studios in Chicago beginning in April 2010. The album's title and release date were announced that November. In February 2011 the band streamed the song "Punk Band" exclusively through Alternative Press, followed several weeks later by streaming the entire album through Punknews.org. The band embarked on a supporting tour of the United States from February to April of that year. A music video for "Punk Band" premiered March 1, 2011.

== Reception ==
Professional ratings
Review scores
Source	Rating
AllMusic	4/5 stars
Alternative Press	3.5/5 stars
Punknews.org	3.5/5 stars

Rick Anderson of AllMusic remarked, "While [the songs] deal with some predictable themes — obsessive and unrequited love ('Wish We Were,' 'Diary of a Teen Tragedy'); ambivalence about the future ('College'); mono ('I've Got Mono'), and rock & roll itself ('Punk Band') — [Josh] Caterer addresses them with a refreshing lack of either eye-rolling or rhapsodic mystification." He also praised the band's musical maturity, noting "the blend of smoothly crooning vocals and meat-and-potatoes, punk-inflected pop that has always been the hallmark of the Smoking Popes' sound and has only become tighter, richer, and more hook-wise over the years." Jon Gilbertson of the Milwaukee Journal Sentinel compared the album's concept to The Who's Quadrophenia, which also structured its themes around the difficulties of teenage life: "Although This Is Only a Test doesn't try to match Quadrophenia, it does convey the same realization that there's no such thing, for the young, as the folly of youth. And Caterer's voice, perhaps the most tunefully expressive in the entire pop-punk subgenre, brings across the way small things grow gigantic under the influence of hormones."

Bryne Yancey of Alternative Press was critical of the band's musical divergences on the album, stating that "Unfortunately, much like adolescence itself, This Is Only a Test isn't without its moments of awkwardness. Whether it's piano-heavy power ballads ('College'), spoken-word verses written as diary entries ('Diary of a Teen Tragedy') or five-minute electronic tracks about not being able to participate in P.E. class ('Excuse Me, Coach'), Smoking Popes occasionally veer off their tried and true template of catchy, soulful pop-punk, and do so with mixed results." However, he noted that "there are still plenty of hooks to be found on the album, especially it its loaded first half", comparing the band to Weezer and calling the album "a mostly successful experiment." Tori of Punknews.org had similar criticisms, saying of "Excuse Me, Coach" that "I'm not sure what they were thinking, and I'm not sure I want to know", and calling the spoken-word verses in "Diary of a Teen Tragedy" "downright cringeworthy": "The reality remains that the Caterer brothers are not high schoolers. Hearing a man in his late 30s sing about how he can't get a prom date is a little off-putting." However, he called these "small complaints", concluding that "Aside from a couple blunders, This Is Only a Test is a thoroughly enjoyable pop-rock album. At a brisk 10 songs totaling less than 40 minutes, it leaves you wanting more. Plenty to sing along to here."

== Track listing ==
All tracks are written by Josh Caterer.

No.	Title	Length
1.	"Wish We Were"	2:39
2.	"How Dangerous"	3:24
3.	"This Is Only a Test"	3:39
4.	"College"	4:19
5.	"Punk Band"	2:45
6.	"Freakin Out"	3:40
7.	"Diary of a Teen Tragedy"	4:03
8.	"Excuse Me, Coach"	4:42
9.	"I've Got Mono"	3:26
10.	"Letter to Emily"	4:21
Total length:		36:58

== Personnel ==
=== Band ===
- Josh Caterer – lead vocals, guitar, keyboards
- Eli Caterer – guitar, backing vocals
- Matt Caterer – bass guitar, backing vocals
- Neil Hennessy – drums, backing vocals

=== Additional musicians ===
- Jacob Sooter – piano on "College"
- Matt Allison – drum programming on "Excuse Me, Coach"
- Stefanie Caterer – female vocal on "Letter to Emily"
- Jenny Choi – cello on "Letter to Emily"

=== Production ===
- Matt Allison – record producer, recording engineer, mix engineer
- Justin Yates – assistant engineer
- Colin Jordan – mastering
