= Curb Appeal Records =

Record label

- Founded: 2006
- Founder: Jim Suptic, Al Duffy, Enrique Chi, Alex Brahl
- Genre: Alternative rock indie rock
- Country of origin: U.S.
- Location: Kansas City, Missouri
- Official website: Curb Appeal Homepage

Curb Appeal Records was an American record label founded in Kansas City, Missouri by The Get Up Kids guitarist and Blackpool Lights frontman Jim Suptic.

== History ==
In July 2005, The Get Up Kids split up, leaving the members to pursue their own side-projects. This allowed guitarist Jim Suptic to devote his full attention to his new band Blackpool Lights, composed of himself and former members of Butterglory and The Creature Comforts. Rather than accepting an offer from Vagrant Records to sign the band, Suptic decided that he wanted to start over from scratch, and in doing so, created Curb Appeal Records. Suptic co-founded the label with Al Duffy, a Kansas City entrepreneur who had previously run a beer distributor, Enrique Chi, a publicist who had worked with Vedera and Reggie and the Full Effect, and Alex Brahl, who had previously worked at Vagrant Records, in addition to having produced The Get Up Kids' second album, Something to Write Home About. In the summer of 2006, the label released their first album, Blackpool Lights' This Town's Disaster. Soon afterward they signed the band 8mm, and in September of that year released their second album Songs to Love and Die By.

In 2007, The New Amsterdams, fronted by Suptic's old bandmate Matt Pryor announced that they were leaving Vagrant, and that they would be releasing their next album At the Foot of My Rival on Elmar, a collaboration with Curb Appeal Records. On October 29, 2007, Curb Appeal announced they had signed The Last Almanac to the label, and would be releasing their new album A Memoir in 2008. In 2008, it was announced that legendary rock band Smoking Popes would be releasing Stay Down, their first album in 11 years on Curb Appeal records. The album was released digitally through the iTunes Store in spring 2008, and the physical album will be released in stores on August 5, 2008.

The label is no longer in existence, having quietly shut down some time in 2008. While the exact details remain unknown, Suptic commented in a 2009 interview with Lawrence.com that it "blew up in his face."

== Current artists ==
- 8mm
- Blackpool Lights
- The New Amsterdams
- Patrick Park
- Smoking Popes
