= Johann's Face Records =

Record label

Johann's Face Records is an American independent punk record label founded in Chicago in 1989 by Marc Ruvolo and Gar Brandt. The label is associated with early releases by the Smoking Popes and Alkaline Trio.

== History ==
Ruvolo and Brandt modeled Johann's Face on Dischord Records. Its original purpose was to release recordings by Ruvolo's bands No Empathy and Chia Pet, and it operated through informal agreements with musicians the owners knew personally. The roster reached twelve bands during what Ruvolo described as the label's mid-1990s peak.

In the early 1990s, Ruvolo offered to release recordings by the Smoking Popes after seeing the band perform in Chicago. Johann's Face issued the band's first two albums, Get Fired (1993) and Born to Quit (1994); Billboard later reported that the releases attracted the attention of Green Day, preceding the Smoking Popes' move to Capitol Records.

Johann's Face also issued Alkaline Trio's early release "Sundials". Retrospective coverage linked the label with the early careers of both bands: Gapers Block wrote in 2011 that Johann's Face helped launch Alkaline Trio and the Smoking Popes, while Chicago Reader critic Leor Galil described it as a crucial Chicago label.

In 2009, Johann's Face marked its twentieth anniversary with a concert at the Abbey Pub in Chicago. By then, its catalog had reached 88 releases and included records by Alkaline Trio, Smoking Popes, Apocalypse Hoboken and No Empathy. By 2011, Ruvolo was the label's sole owner and had made Bucket O' Blood Books and Records, his shop in Logan Square, its operating base. After running Bucket O' Blood for just over three years, Ruvolo transferred the shop to new owners so that he could tour with his bands and devote more time to Johann's Face.

Johann's Face remained active in the 2020s. In 2020, it released the Fur Coats' third album, Dystopia Sherbit, as the label approached its 105th release. In October 2025, it released Aspic Tines' The Gladness of King Aspic.

== See also ==
- List of record labels
