= Confidence Man (album) =

Studio album by Matt Pryor
- Released: July 29, 2008
- Recorded: February 2008
- Genre: Indie rock; acoustic rock
- Length: 39:54
- Label: Vagrant
- Producer: Matt Pryor

Matt Pryor chronology
Confidence Man (2008)	May Day (2012)

Professional ratings
Review scores
Source	Rating
AbsolutePunk.net	87%
AllMusic	3/5 stars
Silent Sound Waves	5/6 stars

Confidence Man is the first solo album by Matt Pryor, frontman for the New Amsterdams and Get Up Kids, released on July 29, 2008.

== Recording ==
The album was written, produced, and recorded at Pryor's home studio in Lawrence, Kansas. The first single off the album, entitled "Lorelai" was made available on Pryor's Myspace page. The album stemmed from Pryor's desire to write an album before he turned 30, to write and record an album by himself completely.

== Track listing ==
All tracks are written by Matt Pryor.

Confidence Man
No.	Title	Length
1.	"A Totally New Year"	3:01
2.	"Loralai"	1:44
3.	"Still, There's A Light"	2:45
4.	"When The World Stops Turning"	2:07
5.	"I'm Sorry Stephen"	2:21
6.	"We'll Be Fine"	2:02
7.	"Confidence Man"	2:41
8.	"I Wouldn't Change A Thing"	3:11
9.	"Only"	2:03
10.	"Dear Lover"	3:10
11.	"Lovers Who Have Lost Their Cause"	2:56
12.	"Where Did I Go Wrong"	2:58
13.	"On How Our Paths Differ"	2:29
14.	"Who Do You Think You Are"	3:31
15.	"It Ends Here"	3:06

== Personnel ==
- Matt Pryor – vocals, guitar, percussion, piano, production
- Colin Mahoney – mixing
- Joe Montgomery – photography
