= Smoking Popes =

American pop punk band

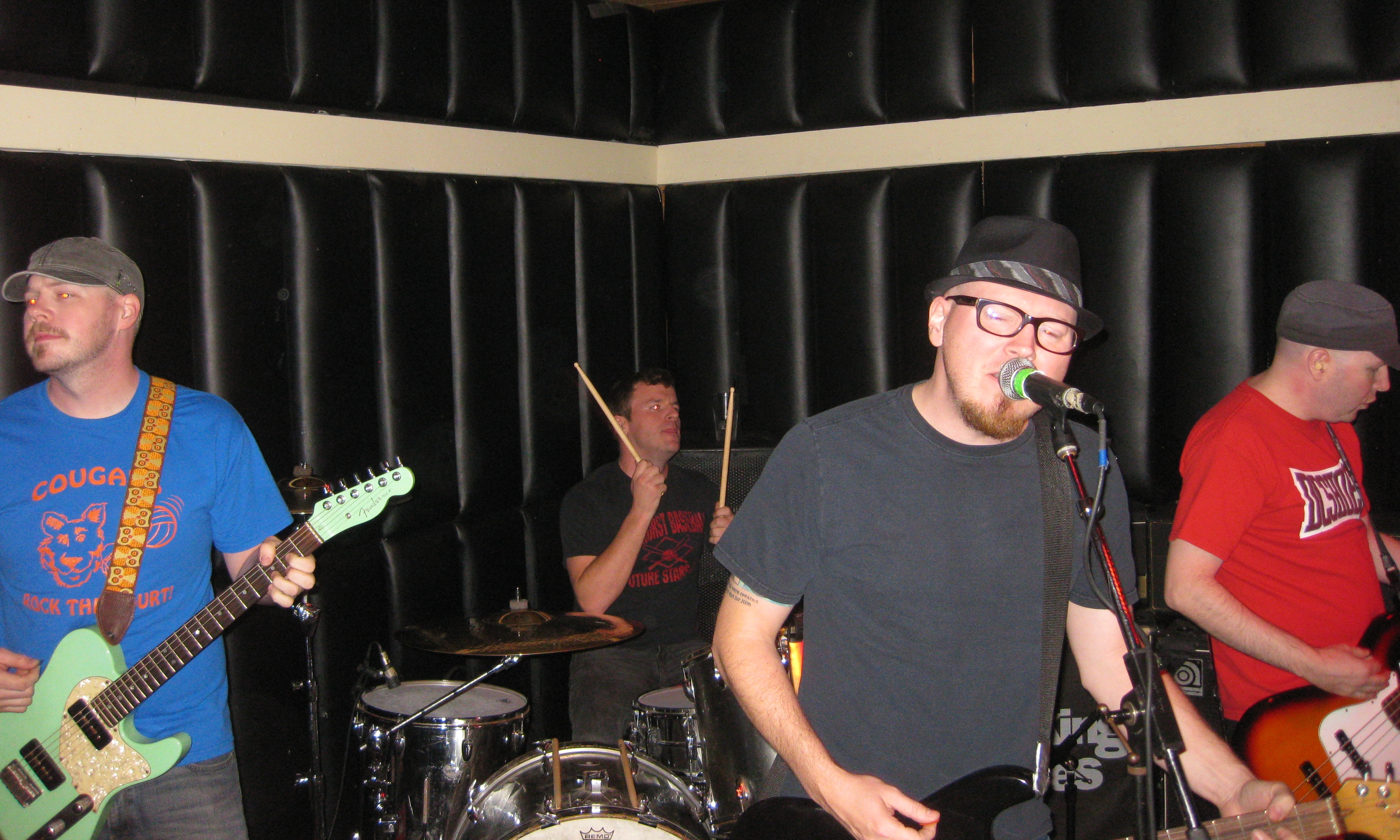
- Left to right: Eli Caterer, Neil Hennessy, Josh Caterer, and Matt Caterer in 2012

Background information
- Origin: Lake in the Hills, Illinois
- Genres: Pop punk, alternative rock, indie rock, punk rock, emo
- Years active: 1991–1999, 2005–present
- Labels: Radius, Johann's Face, Capitol, Double Zero, Victory, Curb Appeal, Asian Man, Flameshovel
- Members: Josh Caterer; Eli Caterer; Matt Caterer; Mike Felumlee
- Past members: Dave Martens; Rob Kellenberger; Ryan Chavez; Neil Hennessy
- Website: smokingpopesmusic.com

Smoking Popes is an American pop punk band from the northwest suburbs of Chicago. They are composed of brothers Matt Caterer (bass), Josh Caterer (lead vocals/guitar) and Eli Caterer (guitar/backing vocals) and Mike Felumlee (drums).

== History ==
=== Early history ===
In 1990, the Caterer brothers formed a punk trio called Speedstick with Josh on vocals/guitar, Eli on bass, and Matt on drums. They played one gig in a friend's basement, after which the Caterer parents decided that Eli, then a sophomore in high school, would have to quit the band until after he graduated, so Matt switched to bass and Dave Martens joined on drums. That summer, at their first self-funded recording session, the trio recorded about 15 original songs composed by Josh, some of which would form the basis of the Smoking Popes early material.

They played a handful of local shows over the next year, and in the summer of 1991, they changed the band's name to Smoking Popes, inspired by one of the Caterer brothers' favorite movies The Pope of Greenwich Village. Soon after that, Martens left the band and the Caterer brothers recruited Mike Felumlee to replace him.

In late 1991, the band released their first EP called Inoculator with help from local indie label Radius Records. In early 1992, the band self-released a 4 song EP called "The Smoking Popes Break Up", recorded by Phil Bonnet. That summer, Eli rejoined the band on guitar and they self-released another EP called "2". They continued to play shows in small venues around the midwest.

In 1993, the band got a break when pop punk icon Ben Weasel of Screeching Weasel became a fan and used his connections to recruit Mass Giorgini of Squirtgun to record the Smoking Popes' first full-length album, Get Fired, which was released by Chicago indie label Johann's Face Records.

In early 1994, the band resumed their partnership with Phil Bonnet and began recording their second LP called Born to Quit which included the song "Need You Around", which would later launch Smoking Popes to a huge audience via the soundtrack to the film Clueless.

=== Signing with Capitol ===
Another break for the Popes came in the summer of 1994 when they were invited to open for Green Day, who extended the invitation after hearing Get Fired. Later that summer, their new album, Born to Quit came out on Johann's Face. After "Need You Around" took off on alternative radio they gained the attention of record label scouts. They signed with Capitol Records, which re-released Born to Quit. In a promotional blitz, they toured America with the Gummy Dolls and Tripping Daisy.

In 1996 the Clueless soundtrack was released in Finland and "Need You Around" was dropped as a single to capitalize on their newfound popularity there. It was promptly designated "Single of the Week" by the New Musical Express. They toured England and Scotland for a couple of weeks, then returned to America to tour with Jawbreaker.

Despite the touring, album sales didn't meet Capitol's expectations and it became clear that the band had to deliver a hit. Producer Jerry Finn, who had added gloss to the sound of Green Day and Rancid, was brought in to do the same for Smoking Popes. In September they toured with label-mates The Figgs and Jimmy Eat World.

The start of 1997 brought dissatisfied label executives who insisted they didn't hear a single among the tracks Smoking Popes submitted for the new album. The band spent six days writing and demoing songs until Capitol was finally determined that new song "I Know You Love Me" had potential. However, the label fired the Popes' A&R representative and the new album was shelved.

After negotiations, Destination Failure was released in August. At this point Tom Counihan, a.k.a. Tom Daily, joined the band as a touring guitarist. In October they began to tour with Morrissey, who said of their earlier album Born To Quit, "[it's] extraordinary, the most lovable thing I'd heard in years."

The band funded its own video for "I Know You Love Me", which was filmed as a single camera shot, in a rehearsal space at Metro using the creative talents of members of Defiant Theatre.

In 1998 the band toured with Triple Fast Action and Menthol. Afterward, the band decided to record a covers album called The Party's Over, which would fulfill their contract with Capitol.

=== Breakup - forming Duvall ===
Around this time Josh became very involved in Christianity and wanted to devote his work to his faith. The label rejected the new album and released Smoking Popes from their contract. The band played several large shows before Josh quit, effectively breaking up the band.

In a later interview, Josh commented about this time "I became a Christian in May 1998 and I quit the Popes in January 1999. I tried to incorporate my faith into what we were doing in the Popes, but it just didn't seem like a good fit."

Josh's side project Duvall was formed in August 2001, including members of the Smoking Popes, who had disbanded in 1998. Founding members were Josh Caterer and Mike Felumlee. The band released one full-length album, Volume & Density in 2003.

=== Reunion ===
In November 2005, the Smoking Popes reunited for a packed and much-anticipated show at the Chicago club The Metro with Rob Kellenberger of Colossal replacing Mike Felumlee on drums. The tickets sold out in a mere 36 minutes.

Due to Josh's conversion to Christianity and past stance on particular "non-christian" themes in a select few pre-1999 songs, many fans wondered what sort of setlist would be played at the Popes reunion show. In a Q and A on the band's website, Josh responded to such questions saying, "No. There are only a couple songs that we wouldn't consider playing, and those are songs we didn't used to play very often anyway, so no one will miss them. We've been practicing through most of the old Popes catalog, trying to pick the songs that are the strongest. And we don't yet know what the final song selection will be, but I don't think people will be disappointed. All the real favorites should be there." In that show – recorded on a DVD called At Metro, bundled with a CD of the performance – Josh, Matt and Eli were happy and energized. Eli remarked that he hadn't had that much fun in seven years.

In March 2006, Bayside released an acoustic album with a cover of "Megan" featuring Josh Caterer on the second verse of the song.

They embarked on a U.S. tour in early 2006 with Bayside. During that time, the Popes acquired a new drummer, Ryan Chavez, who replaced Kellenburger, who was unable to commit to the new, full-time touring schedule. During this tour, Josh introduced and played several new songs, including "If You Don't Care", "Stay Down" and "Welcome to Janesville", which he announced would be on the upcoming Smoking Popes album. The new album, the first original material since 1997's "Destination Failure", was originally scheduled for release in September 2007, but was delayed while the band decided on a label. On March 2, 2008, the title of the new album, Stay Down, was disclosed when the band played it in its entirety at Schuba's Tavern in Chicago. The album was released on the independent label Curb Appeal Records.

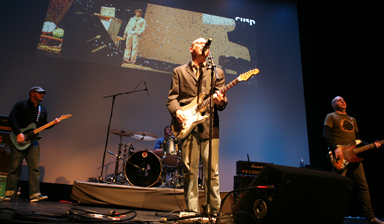
Smoking Popes at the 2008 Cusp Conference in Chicago

In April 2008, the Smoking Popes announced that Neil Hennessy of The Lawrence Arms would be playing drums for the band.

According to the Asian Man Records website, past issues of the Smoking Popes will be re-released in 2009. In the Fall, their first three 7-inch releases, Inoculator, BreakUp, and 2, were reissued with additional material. Following in 2010 was a reissue of "Get Fired", remastered with new artwork, which was released on CD and Vinyl. The band also got to work on a new album, with fans having the ability to follow the progress on Josh's Twitter page. The album, titled This Is Only a Test was released on Asian Man Records.

In April 2015, Mike Felumlee re-joined the band as Neil Henessey was relocating to Los Angeles.

In 2016, the Smoking Popes released the EP "Simmer Down", which is the first record since 1998 to feature the original lineup. On the official Smoking Popes Twitter page, they stated it was released so fans would have new songs people could sing along with when they played at Riot Fest 2016 in Chicago. They continue to perform live in 2021, including on August 28 at the annual Backlot Bash in Skokie, Illinois.

== Discography ==
Studio albums

- Get Fired (1993)
- Born to Quit (1994)
- Destination Failure (1997)
- The Party's Over (2003)
- Stay Down (2008)
- This Is Only a Test (2011)
- Into the Agony (2018)
- Lovely Stuff (2025)
