= The New Amsterdams =

American rock band

- Origin: Lawrence, Kansas, U.S.
- Genres: Acoustic rock, indie rock
- Years active: 2000–present
- Labels: Elmar / Curb Appeal, Vagrant
- Members: Matt Pryor; Dustin Kinsey; Eric McCann; Bill Belzer; Jason Rich
- Past members: Ed Rose; Rob Pope; Ryan Pope

The New Amsterdams is an American band featuring Matthew Pryor of The Get Up Kids. In a certain sense, they represented the acoustic counter-project to The Get up Kids. In contrast to The Get Up Kids, this project features acoustic guitars, the accordion, wind instruments, strings, and mature elements of American folklore. Among the members were also numerous musicians and contributors of The Get Up Kids and other friendly bands.

== History ==
The New Amsterdams began as a solo project of The Get Up Kids lead singer, Matt Pryor. The band was named after the song New Amsterdam by Elvis Costello from 1980.

=== Never You Mind (2000) ===
In 2000, he released his debut album Never You Mind, which was largely made up of acoustic tracks with sparse accompaniment. However, the album also featured Alex Brahl, Ed Rose, Jake Cardwell & Rob Pope providing extra instrument tracks. It was released at a time when The Get Up Kids were already becoming more and more successful. The first five albums of the New Amsterdams were released on Vagrant Records.

=== Para Toda Vida, Worse for the Wear (2002–2003) ===
Two years later in January 2002, Pryor released Para Toda Vida, this time sticking almost purely to acoustic guitar, with the exception of a few tracks utilizing the harmonica and banjo as well. However, the next year, the band went a step further in the release of Worse for the Wear, which utilized a full band for the first time. This included The Get Up Kids bandmates Ryan Pope and his brother Rob, as well as longtime friend and producer Ed Rose. The album was one of the earlier albums to be recorded at Black Lodge Studios, the recording studio renovated and co-owned by Ed Rose and the members of The Get Up Kids.

=== Story Like a Scar, Killed or Cured (2005–2007) ===
The band's next album, Killed or Cured was released in 2005. However, it was written during a turbulent time for The Get Up Kids, who were heading towards a breakup. Because of this, Vagrant Records, the label to which both the bands were signed, didn't want to release the album until The Get Up Kids finished their farewell tour in the summer of that year. For this reason, a portion of the album was released online for free via The New Amsterdams website. In 2005 they played on the Austin City Limits Music Festival. The album Killed or Cured was released in its full version through retail channels on April 10, 2007.

In 2006, the band released the album Story Like a Scar with what is now the current lineup, including Bill Belzer on drums, Eric McCann on upright bass, and Dustin Kinsey on guitar. In the same year, The New Amsterdams played alongside bands like Depeche Mode and Daft Punk at the Coachella Valley Music and Arts Festival.

=== At the Foot of My Rival (2007) ===
In September 2007, the band released another album, At the Foot of My Rival on CD, Vinyl, and Digital Download. However, after a long relationship with Vagrant Records, the band decided to release the album on Elmar, (named after Pryor's son Elliot Marshall) an offshoot of Curb Appeal Records, owned in part by bandmate Jim Suptic.

In January 2008, the band released a collection of demos and b-sides, available exclusively through their website.

In May of the same year, they went on their first European tour, starting in Amsterdam. The band planned to go into a small hiatus after that due to Matt Pryor's involvement with The Get Up Kids. Dustin Kinsey also joined the band Koufax.

=== Outroduction (2013) ===
In a November 2011 interview with MidcoastStation.com, Pryor said he had plans to release a New Amsterdams compilation. In 2013, a compilation entitled Outroduction was finally released, which contained B-side material. This time, the album was released on the label Nightshoes Syndicate, founded by Pryor himself.

== Discography ==
=== Albums ===
Year	Title	Record label
2000	Never You Mind	Vagrant Records, Heroes & Villains Records
2002	Para Toda Vida	Vagrant Records, Heroes & Villains Records
2003	Worse for the Wear	Vagrant Records
2006	Story Like a Scar	Vagrant Records
2007	Killed or Cured	Vagrant Records
2007	At the Foot of My Rival	Curb Appeal Records
2013	Outroduction	Nightshoes Syndicate

=== EPs ===
Year	Title	Record label
2005	Killed or Cured	Self-Released
2007	The Companion of My Rival	Curb Appeal Records
2008	Killed or Cured Appendix	Self-released
2008	Demos, Etc. 2003–2008	Self-released

=== Non-album tracks ===
- 2007: Thirty-Three (from Helio Presents: The Smashing Pumpkins Tribute-Album)

=== Music videos ===
- 2006: Turn Out The Light
- 2007: Fountain Of Youth

== Reviews ==
- AbsolutePunk.net: review of Story Like a Scar
- PopMatters: review of Never You Mind
- Pitchfork Media: review of Para Toda Vida
