= Josh Caterer =

American singer-songwriter

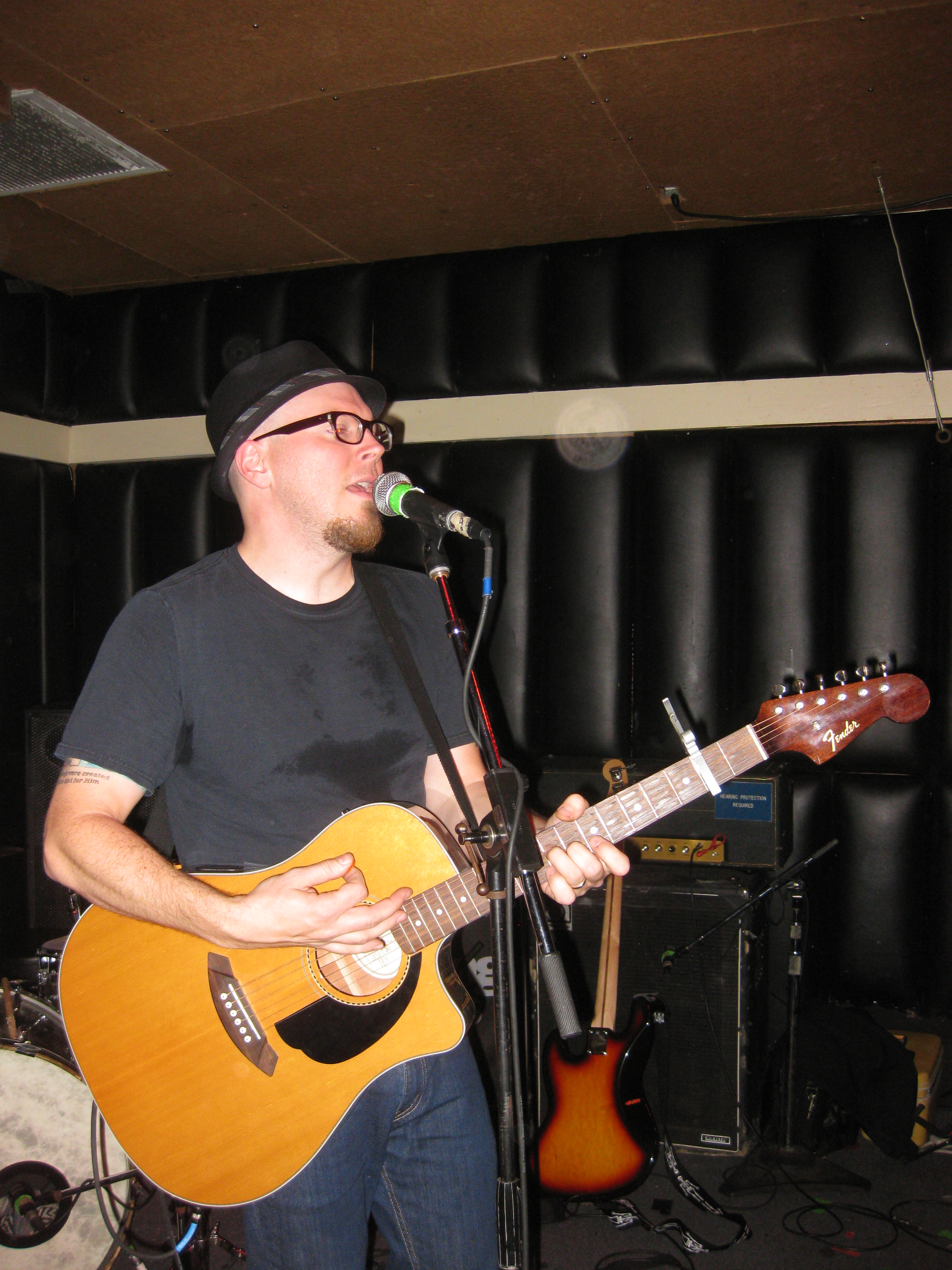
Josh Caterer in 2012

Josh Caterer (born April 12, 1972) is an American, Chicago-area musician, best known as the lead singer, lead guitarist, and principal songwriter of pop-punk band Smoking Popes, which he founded in 1991 with his older brother Matt and younger brother Eli. The band has remained active except for a hiatus between 1998 and 2005. Josh has also written and recorded music with different bands and as a solo artist in a variety of genres, including gospel, blues, rock and pop-punk.

== Early life ==
Josh Caterer grew up in Carpentersville, Illinois, where he attended Kings Road Elementary School and Carpentersville Middle School. Later, his family moved to Lake In The Hills IL, where he attended nearby H.D. Jacobs High School, graduating in 1990. After graduation, he held several menial jobs such as gas station cashier and machine operator at a plastics company. In 1995, he married Stefanie, his high school sweetheart.

== Career ==
Smoking Popes formed in 1991 and began playing small local venues around the Chicago suburbs. Their first album Get Fired was released in 1993 by Chicago indie label Johann's Face Records. An opening spot for Green Day drew the attention of major labels, and in 1995 they signed to Capitol Records, which released their second album Born to Quit. The single from that album, "Need You Around", was included on the soundtrack to the hit movie Clueless and the band's career took off. They started touring North America and Europe as a headlining act, also opening for such artists as Morrissey, Cheap Trick, Goo Goo Dolls, Violent Femmes, Foo Fighters and Tripping Daisy. During the period surrounding Destination Failure, Caterer has said he struggled personally and later became a Christian in 1998, citing C. S. Lewis’s Mere Christianity among his influences. Destination Failure was released in 1997 to critical acclaim, but achieved only moderate commercial success.

Eventually, after a collapse due to a cocaine overdose at an all-night party his spiritual search intensified, and reading C.S. Lewis's Mere Christianity helped lead him to embrace Christianity in 1998. Shortly after his conversion, Josh quit the Smoking Popes and became heavily involved in his church, also working at World Relief, a charitable, nonprofit organization. In 1999, he self-released a five-song EP of acoustic gospel music called Why Me. In 2001, he founded the Christian rock band Duvall with other former members of the Smoking Popes. Duvall released two full-length albums, including Volume & Density in 2003 and a Christmas album called O Holy Night in 2004.

In November 2005, Josh returned to the Smoking Popes, reuniting the band for a sell-out show at the Chicago club The Metro. Inspired by the success of that reunion, they embarked on a U.S. tour in early 2006 with the band Bayside and began work on a new album called Stay Down, which was released in July 2008.

Since then, Smoking Popes have released two more full-length albums, This Is Only A Test in 2011 and Into the Agony in 2018. Josh also started a blues band in 2015 called Jackson Mud Band, which released a full-length album called Stranger Blues in 2019.

In October 2020, Josh played a virtual concert at the Hideout in Chicago, which was released the following year as a live solo album called The Hideout Sessions. This was followed by another performance in early 2021 at SPACE in Evanston, IL, which was released later that year as The SPACE Sessions on Pravda Records.

Today, Josh continues to record and tour with Smoking Popes, performing occasionally as a solo artist.

=== Church musician ===
Since 2001, Josh has worked as a worship leader and music director at several Christian churches in the Chicago suburbs. He has also written and recorded worship and gospel music, including a full-length solo album called O the Love of My Redeemer, which was released in 2019.

== Personal life ==
Josh lives in Aurora, Illinois, with his wife, Stefanie. They have two children, Elliot and Phoebe.
