= Vagrant Records =

American record label

- Parent company: BMG Rights Management
- Founded: 1995
- Founder: Rich Egan; Jon Cohen
- Distributors: Universal Music Group (physical); BMG Rights Management (digital)
- Genre: Various, predominantly on rock
- Country of origin: United States
- Location: Santa Monica, California
- Official website: vagrant.com

Vagrant Records is an American record label based in California. It was founded in 1995 by Rich Egan and Jon Cohen. The label focuses on rock, but features artists in a variety of other genres including folk, soul, electronic, and pop. The label is considered one of the pre-eminent labels of the emo music scene.

In 2014, Vagrant was acquired by BMG Rights Management. Co-founder Jon Cohen then became BMG's executive vice president of recorded music, until he left the company in September 2017. It remains to be distributed autonomously (outside of BMG's main distribution partner Warner Music Group), by affiliated labels in selected countries.

== History ==
The first band signed by Vagrant Records was Boxer and their album The Hurt Process was released on May 5, 1998. The pop-punk album notably featured drummer Chris Pennie, who would go on to play with Dillinger Escape Plan and Coheed and Cambria.

=== The Get Up Kids ===
In 1999, Vagrant Records signed Kansas City, Missouri, band the Get Up Kids, and the band's Vagrant debut, Something to Write Home About, was released in September 1999. Egan and Cohen borrowed $50,000 from Cohen's parents to fund the recording of the Get Up Kids album, derived from the mortgaging of the family house. The album was successful, and single-handedly made Vagrant Records one of the top independent labels in the country.

=== Rapid growth ===
They signed Los Angeles punk rock trio Automatic 7 and released the band's second album, Begger's Life, on July 25, 2000. They followed this by signing and releasing albums from heavyweights in the emo scene like Alkaline Trio, Saves the Day, and Dashboard Confessional. In June 2001, the label signed a distribution deal with JCOR Records, which in turn was distributed by Universal Records. It allowed Vagrant's releases to be available in stores via Universal's distribution methods. In March 2002, the label made a distribution deal with Festival Mushroom Records, who would handled Vagrant's releases in Australia. Vagrant would later enter into a deal with Interscope Records. In June 2002, the label signed a deal with Motor Music, which handled distribution and promotion for Vagrant's releases in Germany. Dashboard Confessional's video for "Screaming Infidelities", directed by Maureen Egan and Matthew Barry, earned Vagrant the MTV2 award at the 2002 MTV Video Music Awards. Rich Egan is cited as saying that the MTV Video Music Award win "changed everything" for the label.

=== Paul Westerberg ===
The label then went on to release solo material from the Replacements frontman, Paul Westerberg, signifying an initial departure from its roots of nineties punk and emo.

=== Genre diversification ===
They soon signed Eels and released their album Blinking Lights and Other Revelations in 2005. That year, the label acquired New York City indie label Startime International, with whom they co-released albums from the French Kicks and The Futureheads. During that time, Vagrant signed the Hold Steady and the Lemonheads.

=== Poquito Records ===
In 2006, Vagrant formed a children's label imprint, Poquito Records, and released If You Ever See an Owl, the debut album by the Terrible Twos, a side-project of Vagrant artist the New Amsterdams.

=== Density Records ===
In April 2007, Vagrant formed another imprint label, Density Records, which will release heavier material than has traditionally been released on the label.

On August 5, 2009, Rammstein, the Berlin-based industrial metal sextet, signed a US marketing and distribution deal with Vagrant Records.

== Current Artists ==
- Active Child
- Alexander
- Band of Skulls
- Benjamin Francis Leftwich
- Black Rebel Motorcycle Club
- Blitzen Trapper
- Brooke Fraser
- California Wives
- CRUISR
- Death Spells
- Dustin Kensrue
- Edward Sharpe and the Magnetic Zeros
- Eels
- The Elected
- French Kicks
- The Grates
- The Hold Steady
- LP
- Mayer Hawthorne
- Missy Higgins
- MonstrO
- The Night Marchers
- Pete Yorn
- PJ Harvey
- Reptar
- Rogue Wave
- Sublime with Rome (Europe)
- The Terrible Twos
- Wake Owl
- The 1975

== Former Artists ==
- Ace Enders and a Million Different People
- Albert Hammond Jr.
- Alkaline Trio
- Alexisonfire
- The Anniversary
- The Appleseed Cast
- The A-Sides
- Audio Learning Center
- Automatic 7
- Bad Suns
- Balance and Composure
- Biology
- The Bled
- Bloc Party
- Bombay Bicycle Club
- Boxer
- City and Colour
- The Comas
- A Cursive Memory
- Dashboard Confessional
- Down to Earth Approach
- Dr Manhattan
- Emanuel
- Face to Face
- FACT
- Far
- From Autumn to Ashes
- The Futureheads
- The Get Up Kids
- Hey Mercedes
- The Hippos
- The Hold Steady
- Horse the Band
- Hot Rod Circuit
- The (International) Noise Conspiracy
- J. Roddy Walston and the Business
- John Ralston
- Justin Townes Earle
- Koufax
- Leighton Meester
- The Lemonheads
- Matt Pryor
- Moneen
- Murder by Death
- The New Amsterdams
- The Night Marchers
- No Motiv
- Olivia Broadfield
- Protest the Hero
- Paul Westerberg
- Placebo
- Reggie and the Full Effect
- Rocket From The Crypt
- Saves the Day
- School of Seven Bells
- Senses Fail
- So Many Dynamos
- Stars (except Canada)
- Thrice
- Two Tongues
- Viva Death
- Warship
- Waylon Jennings & The .357's

== See also ==
- List of record labels
