= Dave Trumfio =

American record producer (born 1968)

- Born: August 16, 1968 (age 58); Chicago, Illinois, U.S.
- Occupations: Record producer; mixer; recording engineer; composer; musician
- Years active: 1980s–present
- Labels: Kingsize Platters; Almo Sounds; Rondor/Universal Records
- Website: kingsizesoundlabs.com

David Trumfio (born August 16, 1968) is an American record producer, mixer, engineer and musician, best known for his production work with artists including Wilco and his recordings with his band The Pulsars.

== Production work ==
Trumfio grew up in Mount Prospect, Illinois and was a staff engineer after apprenticing at Seagrape Recording Studios. He began a home studio, Kingsize Recording Den, officially opening Kingsize Soundlabs in Chicago's Wicker Park district in 1991 with partner Mike Hagler. He lives in Los Angeles and runs Kingsize SoundLabs, a recording studio in Glassell Park, a Los Angeles neighborhood, which his wife, Ronna, manages. In June 2008, Vintage King's web site referenced Dave Trumfio saying that he "knew (that) he wanted to make recording his life from the day he bought his first multitrack, a Fostex X15 4 track, way back in 1984.

His early work included recordings by Evil Beaver, The Mekons, Wilco, Alternative TV, Stewart Moxham, the guitarist for Young Marble Giants, and British rock band The Pretty Things. He has since worked with Wilco, OK Go, and Patrick Park.

Trumfio has worked for independent record labels including Merge Records, TeenBeat Records, Touch and Go Records/Quarterstick Records, Minty Fresh, Simple Machines, Darla Records and Vagrant Records. He has also produced recordings by singer songwriter Patrick Park, chamber pop band The Aluminum Group, funk musicians The Baldwin Brothers, Number One Cup, and Franklin Bruno. Since 2009, Trumfio has worked with Built To Spill, American Music Club, Booker T, new wave revivalists The Rentals, and Australian band Papa vs Pretty.

== Musician ==
Trumfio was the frontman in the 1990s new wave band The Pulsars, in which he did "everything but play the drums" with his brother Harry acting as the band's drummer. After their debut single came out, the band signed to Herb Alpert and Jerry Moss's post A&M Records venture Almo Sounds in 1995. The Pulsars released an album and two EPs.

Dave Trumfio also played in Ashtray Boy, The Mekons (intermittently), in English singer, Sally Timms' band, and on The Aluminum Group's Plano album. After bassist Sarah Corina left the Mekons in 2015, Trumfio replaced her through 2025 at least.

== Production discography ==
=== 1991–1999 ===
- Big Jack Johnson — Daddy, When Is Mama Comin' Home (1991)
- Mr. Fingers — Introduction (1992)
- Certain Distant Suns — Huge E.P. (1992)
- Ashtray Boy — Honeymoon Suite (1993)
- Certain Distant Suns — Happy on the Inside (1994)
- Various Artists — Insurgent Country, Vol.1: For a Life of Sin (Bloodshot Records, 1994)
- DQE — But Me, I Fell Down (1994)
- Pigface — Notes from Thee Underground (1994)
- The Mekons — Retreat from Memphis (1994)
- The Pretty Things — Wine, Women & Whiskey: More Chicago Blues & Rock Sess (1994)
- Jonboy Langford & The Pine Valley Cosmonauts — Misery Loves Company: Songs of Johnny Cash (1995)
- The Handsome Family — Odessa (1995)
- Number One Cup — Possum Trot Plan (1995)
- Holiday — Holiday (1995)
- Number One Cup — Divebomb (1996)
- The Handsome Family — Milk and Scissors (1996)
- Yum-Yum — Dan Loves Patti (1996)
- The Coctails — Live at Lounge Ax (1996)
- Holiday — Ready, Steady, Go (1996)
- Butterglory — Are You Building a Temple in Heaven (1996)
- Rico Bell — Return of Rico Bell (1996)
- Motorhome — Sex Vehicle (1996)
- The Pulsars — Submission to the Masters (1996)
- Godzuki — Trail of the Lonesome Pine (1996)
- The Pulsars — Pulsars (1997)
- Palace Music — Lost Blues & Other Songs (1997)
- Tsunami — Brilliant Mistake (1997)
- hollAnd — Your Orgasm (1997)
- Billy Bragg & Wilco — Mermaid Avenue (1998)
- Aluminum Group — Plano (1998)
- The Legendary Jim Ruiz Group — Sniff (1998)
- Sally Timms — Cowboy Sally's Twilight Laments for Lost Buckaroos (1999)
- Wilco — Summerteeth (1999)
- Floraline — Floraline (1999)

=== 2000–2009 ===
- Tristeza — Dream Signals In Full Circles (2000)
- Aden — Hey 19 (2000)
- Koufax — It Had to Do With Love (2000)
- Billy Bragg & Wilco — Mermaid Avenue, Vol. 2 (2000)
- The Prescriptions — Why We Don't Rent to Women (2000)
- My Morning Jacket — At Dawn (2001)
- Jenny Toomey — Antidote (2001)
- Justin Planasch — Roam (2001)
- Gift Original Soundtrack — Original Soundtrack (2001)
- Wayne Kramer — Adult World (2002)
- Franklin Bruno — Cat May Look at a Queen (2002)
- The Baldwin Brothers — Cooking with Lasers (2002)
- Irving — Good Morning Beautiful (2002)
- Various Artists — MTV2 Handpicked, Vol. 2 (2002)
- Mates of State — Our Constant Concern (2002)
- Koufax — Social Life (2002)
- Ok Go — Get Over It (2002)
- Slowrider — Nacimiento (2002)
- Ok Go — Ok Go (2002)
- Earlimart — Avenues (2003)
- Patrick Park — Loneliness Knows My Name (2003)
- The Sun — Love & Death (2003)
- Jamison Parker — Notes & Photographs EP (2003)
- Underworld Original Soundtrack — Original Soundtrack (2003)
- The Velvet Teen — Elysium (2004)
- Chuck Prophet — Age Of Miracles (2004)
- Kool Keith/Kutmasta Kurt — Break U Off/Takin' It Back (2004)
- Thelonious Monster — California Clam Chowder (2004)
- Simon Joyner — Lost with the Lights On (2004)
- Elkland — Apart (2005)
- Elkland — Apart (The Remixes) (2005)
- Elkland — Golden (2005)
- Nothing Painted Blue — Taste the Flavor (2005)
- Koufax – Hard Times Are in Fashion (2005)
- Grandaddy — Excerpts From The Diary of Todd Zilla (2005)
- Grandaddy — Just Like the Fambly Cat (2006)
- Future Pigeon — Echodelic Sounds of Future Pigeon (2006)
- The Baldwin Brothers — The Return of the Golden Rhodes (2006)
- The Adored — New Language (2006)
- Devics — Push the Heart (2006)
- Nadine Zahr — Underneath the Everyday (2006)
- Earlimart — Mentor Tormentor (2007)
- Acute — Arms Around a Stranger (2007)
- Let's Go Sailing — Chaos in Order (2007)
- Patrick Park — Everyone's in Everyone (2007)
- Kristin Mooney — Hydroplane (2007)
- American Music Club — Golden Age (2008)
- E for Explosion — Reinventing the Heartbeat (2008)
- Great Northern — Sleepy Eepee (2008)
- Devics — Distant Radio (2008)
- The Rentals — Songs About Time (2009)
- Built to Spill — There Is No Enemy (2009)
- MC Lars — This Gigantic Robot Kills (2009)

=== 2010–present ===
(incomplete)

- Papa vs Pretty — White Deer Park (2014)
- Mekons — Deserted (2019)
- Dogstar — Somewhere Between the Power Lines and Palm Trees (2023)
