= Pop American Style =

Compilation album
- Released: 1996
- Genre: Indie pop
- Length: 1:53:30
- Label: March Records

chronology
Pop American Style (1996)	Moshi Moshi: Pop International Style (1999)

Pop American Style is a double disc indie pop compilation album, released in 1996 by March Records and subtitled, "40 Original Artists, 40 Original Hits". The label said that "the idea behind the project was to show off most of the deserving acts who created music from their bedrooms, dormrooms, and garages." A follow-up album, Moshi Moshi: Pop International Style, followed in 1999.

== Critical reception ==
AllMusic's Stephen Cramer said it "set the benchmark for indie pop and twee pop compilations" and that it "began a trend of independently released pop in the late '90s." AllMusic's Tim Sendra made it a staff pick, saying that "Not all of [the songs] are hits, but enough are that the combined slugging percentage is hall of fame worthy." When the album was released, CMJ New Music Monthly said it featured "40 bands of the wimpier ilk (this is a description, not an insult) from all over America."

== Track listing ==
Disc 1
No.	Title	Artist	Length
1.	"Summer Days"	Shoestrings	4:08
2.	"Hey, Hey, Girl"	Rocketship	2:15
3.	"Howard"	Cub	2:42
4.	"It's Only Love"	Holiday	1:12
5.	"Old Junk for Fashion"	Verbena	4:10
6.	"No Way, No Way"	Heartworms	1:55
7.	"Bellman"	Sissy Bar	3:06
8.	"Sold You an Alibi"	Superdrag	3:07
9.	"Didn't You Know"	Allen Clapp & His Orchestra	2:34
10.	"I'd Know You Anywhere"	Beanpole	2:18
11.	"Go Kid Go"	My Favorite	3:21
12.	"Thrill Fit"	Syrup USA	2:17
13.	"Soren Loved Regina"	The Receptionists	1:57
14.	"Pelican"	Dunebuggy	2:23
15.	"Fresh Coffee"	Orange Cake Mix	1:52
16.	"Your Kind"	Racecar	2:42
17.	"Everywhere Girl"	The Dupont Circles	2:55
18.	"Spectators"	Elf Power	2:17
19.	"Marine Parade (For Keith Blueboy)"	Aberdeen	2:07
20.	"Memphis"	The Push Kings	5:06

Disc 2
No.	Title	Artist	Length
1.	"Green Light"	Salteen	3:24
2.	"Day to Day"	Further	2:18
3.	"Starry Night"	Poundsign	3:45
4.	"Every Once & Awhile"	Holiday Flyer	3:25
5.	"Mercy"	Kleenex Girl Wonder	2:31
6.	"Inanimate Objects"	Bunnygrunt	2:35
7.	"O Tedium"	Vehicle Flips	2:31
8.	"Lost and Found"	The Seashell Sea	3:06
9.	"Who's Gonna Hold the Rope"	Godzuki	2:42
10.	"Japanese Couple in Reverse"	All About Chad	2:07
11.	"Magic"	Motorhome	3:29
12.	"Five Hours"	Igloo	3:34
13.	"Piano Lessons for Beauty Queens"	Tullycraft	3:19
14.	"New Year's Day"	Kickstand	3:29
15.	"Security Blanket"	Tizzy	3:29
16.	"Red Roses"	The Lefties	1:43
17.	"Redo"	Red Dye No. 5	3:00
18.	"Turn Key One"	Pee	2:08
19.	"Secret Song"	The Christines	3:55
20.	"Ageism"	Flowchart	4:27
