= Social Life =

Studio album by Koufax
- Released: October 22, 2002
- Recorded: May and June 2002
- Studio: Kingsize Studio Los Angeles, CA
- Genre: Indie rock
- Length: 36:15
- Label: Vagrant
- Producer: Dave Trumfio, Michael Krassner

Koufax chronology
It Had to Do with Love (2000)	Social Life (2002)	Hard Times Are in Fashion (2005)

Professional ratings
Review scores
Source	Rating
Allmusic	4/5
Modern Superior	(favorable)
PopMatters	(favorable)
Pitchfork	7.2/10

Social Life is the second studio album by the American indie rock band Koufax. The song "Bright Side" was featured in an episode of the adult animated sitcom Clone High.

== Background ==
Unlike the previous album, Social Life was recorded as a quartet. Instead of recording with two keyboard players, this time they decided to record additional guitar parts.

After the last record two members left the band. Ben Force was included as a new band member, replacing not only the bass player. Since he also played guitar, he was able to complement the keyboard player as well. Accordingly, the new album was heavier on the guitars.

The credits are indicated as follows in the blurb: "Suchan writes the Lion's share of the Koufax cuts, although not strictly in that order."

== Track listing ==
No.	Title	Length
1.	"Let Us Know"	3:21
2.	"Break It Off"	3:20
3.	"Social Life"	3:20
4.	"Saturday's Alone"	3:24
5.	"Come Back to Life"	3:01
6.	"So Put On"	3:04
7.	"Bright Side"	3:22
8.	"Younger Body, Older Soul"	2:47
9.	"Simply Passing Time"	2:39
10.	"Adultery"	3:13
11.	"Honest Answers (Japanese bonus track)"	3:35
12.	"So Long to Good Times"	4:44
Total length:		36:15

== Reception ==
The album received mainly positive reviews:

"It's funny how much difference a little piano can make on a rock record […] But with the piano, Koufax are iconoclasts, recalling some of the least hipster-friendly music of the last 25 years while still managing to sound contemporary…" - Popmatters

"Koufax seem to have all the right ingredients in place: crisp songwriting, charismatic swagger vocals, punchy rhythm, horn-embellished riffs. […] The quartet is confident enough to list their most obvious heroes right on the cover– I’d already called Joe Jackson and Elvis Costello before squinting through the fine print." - Pitchfork

"The overall effect is like a less-histrionic XTC emerging from a garage with an upbeat Ben Folds Five.Social Life is a distinguished piece of rock archeology with enough passion to suggest that Koufax may have a part to play in the unfolding tapestry of distinctive voices in the rock world." - Allmusic

== Personnel ==
=== The Band ===
- Robert Suchan – vocals, guitar
- Jared Rosenberg – piano, synthesizer
- Ben Force – bass, guitars, background vocals
- Dave Shettler – drums, percussion, synthesizer, bass [piano], background vocals

=== Additional musicians ===
- Dan Clucas - trumpet, flugelhorn
- Vince Meghromi - saxophone [tenor], flute

=== Technical ===
- Dave Trumfio, Michael Krassner – production, recording
- Don C. Tyler – mastering
