= It Had to Do with Love =

Koufax

Studio album by Koufax
- Released: September 5, 2000
- Recorded: June 2000
- Studio: Mad Hatter Studios Silverlake, CA King Sound Studios Hollywood, CA
- Genre: Indie rock
- Length: 40:37
- Label: Vagrant
- Producer: Dave Trumfio

Koufax chronology
Koufax EP (1999)	Koufax (2000)	Social Life (2002)

It Had to Do with Love is the first studio album by the American indie rock band Koufax. It was released in 2000 on Vagrant Records.

== Background ==
While the previous, self-titled debut EP was released by Doghouse, the debut album was distributed by Vagrant Records, respectively their subsidiary Heroes & Villains. The contract with Vagrant was made with the help of the friendly band The Get Up Kids.

== Track listing ==
All tracks are written by Koufax except as noted

No.	Title	Writer(s)	Length
1.	"Out of Your Element"		4:08
2.	"Move Out, Move On"		3:05
3.	"Minor Chords"		3:59
4.	"It Had to Do with Love"		4:37
5.	"Out of Your Element (Reprise)"		1:59
6.	"Going to Happen"		4:12
7.	"Offering Advice"		4:01
8.	"Living Alone"		3:54
9.	"Work Will Never End"		4:10
10.	"Over It"		6:18
11.	"Steppin' Out (Japanese bonus track)"	Joe Jackson	4:02
Total length:			44:39

== Reception ==
The album received positive to mixed reviews:

"It Had to Do With Love, helped to set into motion the current trend of indie bands wanting to sound like Joe Jackson; it may not have been the biggest selling record in Vagrant’s history, but it was one of the best written, thoughtful, and properly performed pop albums ever to be released by the label." – Ink19

Allmusic writer Vincent Jeffries gave the album 3 out of 5 stars and states: "Koufax draws heavily from '70s synth-rock and pop-prog artists like ELO, Supertramp, and perhaps some early Genesis to piece together their keyboard excursions. …It Had to Do With Love might sound silly, or even boring to hardcore emo or indie fans, however, listeners who treasure bolder, more eclectic recordings will enjoy this pop experiment." – Allmusic

== Personnel ==
=== The Band ===
- Robert Suchan – vocals, guitar
- Jared Rosenberg – piano, keyboards, organ
- Sean Grogan – synthesizers, keyboard, organ
- Andrew Cameron – bass
- Dave Shettler – drums, theremin, background vocals

=== Additional musicians ===
- Louis Castle – trumpet

=== Technical ===
- Dave Trumfio – production, recording
- Ramón Bretón – mastering
- Anthony Arvizu, Pete Magdaleno – engineering [assistant]
