= Light FM (band) =

US musical group

- Origin: Chicago, Los Angeles, U.S.
- Genre: Indie Rock
- Years active: 1999—present
- Members: Josiah Mazzaschi; Nicki Nevlin; Jacquie Parsons; Argel Cota
- Past members: Jimmy Lucido, Savannah Wheeler, Sophia Male, Byron Reynolds, Michelle Reeves, Jennifer Whittenburg, Kim Haden, Harry Trumfio, Mark Ruggiero, Brian Barbier, Cory Verblen, Chris Frantisak, Scott Rosenquist, Matt Espy, Nicole Fiorentino
- Website: www.lightfmmusic.com

Light FM are an American indie rock band based in Los Angeles, CA. The band has released four full-length albums and one EP. Their most recent album, Buzz Kill City, was released on October 4, 2011.

== History ==
Former Motorhome guitarist/vocalist Josiah Mazzaschi formed Light FM in 1999 in Chicago, IL with Chris Frantisak, Mark Ruggiero, and Brian Barbier. The band self-released their first album, This is The Beginning of My Golden Age, in 2004 on their own Electronic Battleship Records label with digital distribution by Chicago's Minty Fresh Records. The record was received to rave reviews by the Chicago Reader, Chicago Sun-Times, and the Chicago Tribune. Songs from the album were featured in the CW's Gossip Girl, One Tree Hill, Dawson's Creek, and MTV's The Hills.

Mazzaschi moved to Los Angeles, CA in the summer of 2005 where he formed a new line-up of the band featuring Kim Haden, Harry Trumfio (The Pulsars), and Brian Barbier. They self-released their self-produced Save the Drama EP in the fall of 2007. The band later released their sophomore full length, Black Magic Marker, on San Francisco-based Devil in the Woods Records in October 2008. Songs from the album were used on Fox's Joss Whedon directed Dollhouse and ABC's How I Met Your Mother.

In the summer of 2009 Nicole Fiorentino (Veruca Salt, Spinnerette, Radio Vago) replaced bassist Brian Barbier. The band released the Mazzaschi produced third full-length record, Let There Be Light FM. Songs from the album were featured on MTV's Jersey Shore, the MTV Film and TV Awards, the MTV Music Awards and 2012's film, The Vow starring Rachel McAdams and Channing Tatum.

On September 9, 2009, Mazzaschi's former Motorhome bandmate Laura Ann Masura was injured in a motorcycle accident. Mazzaschi organized a benefit concert for her on November 8, 2009, in Los Angeles at the Echoplex where Billy Corgan of The Smashing Pumpkins performed under the alias The Backwards Clock Society along with Mark Tulin of The Electric Prunes and Kerry Brown of Chicago group Catherine. Light FM, The Pulsars, Butterfly Child, Kissing Cousins, and The Happy Stars (featuring Brian Young of Fountains of Wayne and Joe Skyward of the Posies) also performed. Corgan also donated two autographed instruments for auction including, Jimmy Chamberlin's drum kit from The Smashing Pumpkins debut record Gish, as well as a bass used at the very first Smashing Pumpkins show. Nicole Fiorentino later joined The Smashing Pumpkins in 2010.

On October 4, 2011, Light FM released their fourth full-length record titled Buzz Kill City and toured theaters across the US opening for The Smashing Pumpkins and The Fancy Space People, featuring Don Bolles from the LA punk band the Germs.

== Discography ==
- This is The Beginning of My Golden Age (2004)
- Save the Drama EP (2007)
- Black Magic Marker (2008)
- Let There Be Light FM (2009)
- Buzz Kill City (2011)

“Click Click” Light FM featuring Lloyd Hemmings [song is a cover of an English Beat song from 1980] - Shrek Forever After (2010)

“Problems of Our Own” - The Vow (2012)
