= White Deer Park =

Studio album by Papa vs Pretty
- Released: 21 February 2014
- Recorded: Studios 301, Forgotten Valley Studios, Sydney, NSW, Australia; Kingsize Soundlabs, Los Angeles, California, United States
- Genre: Rock, indie rock, alternative rock
- Length: 46:57
- Label: Peace & Riot
- Producer: Dave Trumfio

Papa vs Pretty chronology
Memoirs from a Bedroom: Issue 1 (2011)	White Deer Park (2014)

Singles from White Deer Park
- 1. "My Life Is Yours" Released: 13 September 2013; 2. "Smother" Released: 6 December 2013

White Deer Park is the second and final studio album by Australian rock band Papa vs Pretty, and the follow-up to their 2011 ARIA-nominated debut album United in Isolation. It was released on 21 February 2014 through Peace & Riot.

The album was recorded at Studios 301 and Forgotten Valley Studios in Sydney, Australia, and at Kingsize Soundlabs in Silver Lake, Los Angeles, California, throughout March and April 2013. Over 80 new songs were written for the album between 2011 and early 2013, prior to the band entering the studio. The album was produced by Grammy-nominated producer Dave Trumfio.

The album's first single, "My Life Is Yours", was released 13 September 2013, followed by the second single, "Smother", which was released 6 December 2013.

== Track listing ==
No.	Title	Length
1.	"Introduction"	1:05
2.	"Give Me a Reason Not To"	3:35
3.	"Suburban Joan of Arc"	3:31
4.	"Let It Begin"	3:44
5.	"My Life Is Yours"	4:35
6.	"Rain Check"	2:37
7.	"To Do"	4:37
8.	"Interlude"	0:16
9.	"Smother"	3:40
10.	"Million Different Ways"	3:53
11.	"Whatever Works"	2:29
12.	"While I'm Still Young"	4:27
13.	"Roses After Dark"	3:09
14.	"Dementia Praecox"	5:19

== Charts ==
Chart (2014)	Peak position
Australian Albums (ARIA)	35

== Personnel ==
- Thomas Rawle – lead vocals, guitar, keyboards
- Luke Liang – guitar, keyboards, vocals
- Angus Gardiner – bass, vocals, keyboards, violoncello
- Tom Myers – drums, vocals

=== Additional personnel ===
- Dave Trumfio – producer
