= Uwe Flade =

Uwe Flade is a German music video director and entrepreneur. He has directed videos for many artists, such as a-ha, Depeche Mode, Franz Ferdinand, Apocalyptica, Westbam, Volbeat, In Extremo, Nickelback and Rammstein. His shortfilm Das Spray was acquired by ARTE TV in 2022. He also created successful apps for kids like nighty night and little box music box with Egmont Mayer, Heidi Wittlinger and Grit Schuster. In 2014 He was part of Berlin Music Video Awards Jury.

He lives in Berlin, Germany.

== Videography ==
Music videos:

Artist	Song
a-ha	Shadowside
a-ha	Nothing Is Keeping You Here
Carolina Liar	I'm Not Over
Sportfreunde Stiller	Alles Roger
Disco Ensemble	Drop Dead Casanova
Depeche Mode	A Pain that I'm Used To
Kaizers Orchestra	Maestro
Rammstein	Benzin
Depeche Mode	Precious
Koufax	Why Bother at all
Sugarplum Fairy	Sweet Jackie
Apocalyptica	Wie Weit (3 versions)
Sportfreunde Stiller	Ein Kleiner Schritt
Depeche Mode	Enjoy the Silence 04
2raumwohnung	Wir Sind Die Anderen
Sportfreunde Stiller	Ich, Roque
Gomez	Silence
Zoot Woman	Taken It All
Sportfreunde Stiller	Geht es dir genauso?
Nickelback	Figured You Out
In Extremo	Erdbeermund
Dave Gahan	Bottle Living
In Extremo	Küss Mich
Chungking	Making Music
Emil Bulls	This Day
Masha	Legend
Sportfreunde Stiller	Ans Ende Denken Wir Zuletzt
Der Junge mit der Gitarre	Dagegen
Schneider TM	Reality Check
Der Junge mit der Gitarre	Meer sehn
Samba	Dunkelheit Geht Wenn Du Kommst
Sportfreunde Stiller	Ein Kompliment
Tarja Turunen	Die Alive
Franz Ferdinand	Michael
Erasure	All This Time Still Falling Out of Love

Music documentaries:

Artist	Title
Depeche Mode	Making of the Album/ Documentary
Erasure	Concert DVD

Commercials (excerpt):

Company	Title
Swisscom	Play the Button
Krikri	-
Burger King	Beef Tour
Dacia	Passat, Porsche, Mercedes
Volkswagen	Snowflake
Eins live	Zukunftsmusik
