= Jean-François Leduc =

Jean-François Leduc is a Canadian film director from Montreal, Quebec. He has worked on various Canadian films but is mostly known for producing and directing Die Alive in 2001, a low-budget feature film which obtained a Guinness World Record as "Least Expensive Feature Film".

In 2009, with the help and encouragements of Roger Corman, he co-founded Montreal Film Studio and is currently acting as its principal producer. Montreal Film Studio is best known for its "Fantastic Movie Trailers" DVD series.
