= Giant Records =

Record label, sub-label of Warner Bros. Records

- Parent company: Warner Music Group; Warner Music Sweden for Swedish releases since 2015
- Founded: 1990
- Founder: Irving Azoff
- Defunct: 2001 (US)
- Distributors: Warner Bros. Records; Rhino Entertainment (re-issues)
- Genre: Various
- Country of origin: United States
- Official website: www.giantrecords.se

Giant Records was an American record label launched in 1990 as a joint venture between Warner Bros. Records and record executive Irving Azoff. Currently, this name is used as a Swedish label owned by Warner Music Sweden, a Swedish branch of Warner Music Group.

== History ==
In 1990, Giant became a subsidiary label for Warner Music Group. Its first release, in early 1991, was the Gulf War all-star tribute song "Voices That Care," assembled by producer David Foster. That spring, "Hold You Tight" by Tara Kemp was released and went on to become a Top 5 single. In the months that followed, Giant Records released the soundtrack album for the film New Jack City, selling 16 million copies worldwide. The label signed such acts as MC Hammer, Jade, Lord Finesse, and teen pop star Jeremy Jordan. Giant also signed established acts such as Steely Dan, Warren Zevon, Oingo Boingo, Chicago, Deep Purple, Morbid Angel, Brian Wilson, and Kenny Rogers. The label also operated a country music division in Nashville; the first act signed was Dennis Robbins.

In 1992, Irving Azoff expanded the Giant brand into film production. Giant Pictures only produced one film, The Inkwell, in 1994, before shutting down a year later.

In 1993, Giant became dissatisfied with Warner Music Group's practice of international affairs, so it made a deal with BMG to distribute its recordings outside the U.S. By the mid- to late 1990s, the company had replaced most of its staff and launched a subsidiary label called Revolution Records; Brian Wilson signed with the new label in 1997.

The company later reverted to its original name and distributed Paladin Records, which included singer-songwriter Steve Forbert. In 2001, Warner Music Group ended its joint venture with Giant, which was absorbed into Warner Bros. Records. Since then, BMG no longer repressed and distributed any previous releases of Giant. Distribution of current reissues are done by Warner Music's reissue division, Rhino, in conjunction with Warner Records, and many reissues still include Giant logo on packaging.

In February 2015, Warner Music Sweden announced that it would reactivate Giant's name; the first single released under the new Giant Records banner was Simon Erics' "Waiting for the Sun."

On June 9, 2022, Azoff relaunched a rebranded and independent version of the label with no connections to Warner called Giant Music.

== Giant Records recording artists ==
- Artists on Giant Records were primarily distributed by Warner Bros. Records. Giant recording artists marked with (#) were distributed by Reprise Records.
- Above the Law #
- Ahmad
- Deborah Allen
- Air Supply
- Army of Lovers (US) (1991–1992) #
- Atomic Opera
- Peter Blakeley
- Bangalore Choir
- Big Car
- Big Head Todd and the Monsters
- Big Mountain
- Tony Banks (US) #
- Carlene Carter
- Manu Dibango
- Certain Distant Suns
- Chicago ("Night & Day Big Band" album only)
- Mark Collie
- Color Me Badd #
- The Cunninghams
- The D.O.C.
- Deep Purple (US) #
- Denzil
- Disturbed #
- Divine Styler
- Thomas Dolby (US) #
- Earth to Andy
- Hank Flamingo
- Steve Forbert (Revolution/Giant)
- Good2Go #
- Keith Harling
- House of Freaks
- Miki Howard #
- I5
- Icy Blu
- Jade #
- Jeremy Jordan #
- Tara Kemp
- Jena Kraus
- Letters to Cleo #
- Miari
- Michelle Lewis
- Lord Finesse #
- MC Hammer #
- Neal McCoy
- Tim Mensy
- Georgia Middleman
- Morbid Angel
- Joe Nichols
- Daron Norwood
- Oingo Boingo (as "Boingo")
- Orrall & Wright
- Owsley
- Pirates of the Mississippi
- Prime STH
- Pudgee tha Phat Bastard
- The Reese Project
- Regina Regina
- RTZ (Return to Zero) #
- Dennis Robbins
- Kenny Rogers
- Blake Shelton
- Kenny Wayne Shepherd
- Daryle Singletary
- Skew Siskin
- Roger Springer
- Steely Dan #
- Shug & Dap
- Super Deluxe
- Sway & King Tech
- Doug Supernaw
- Tad
- Lisa Taylor
- Tony Thompson
- Too Much Joy
- Valentine
- Rhonda Vincent
- Clay Walker
- Chris Ward
- Don Williams
- Geoffrey Williams
- Brian Wilson #
- The Wilkinsons
- Zaca Creek
- Warren Zevon #

== See also ==
- List of record labels
