= Ashtray Boy =

Indie-rock band

Ashtray Boy is an indie-rock band fronted by peripatetic singer-songwriter Randall S. Lee.

== History ==
The band has been active since c. 1984 and was founded in Adelaide as Ashtray Boy and his Country Cousin. During the band's history they have been based in Sydney, Chicago, Vancouver, and Melbourne. During the mid-1990s, there were two working versions of the band in Sydney and Chicago, with Lee splitting his time between the two cities.

The band is notable for Lee's droll lyrics and singing and odd time signatures. Ashtray Boy has released ten albums and numerous singles and EPs.

After leaving The Cannanes in 1991 and while continuing Ashtray Boy, Lee also co-fronted Nice (not to be confused with The Nice) with Suzannah Stewart-Lindsay, previously a member of the Adelaide band, Rewind on the Paranoid Side. Francesca Bussey, later to be a member of The Cannanes, was a member of Nice during the recording sessions for their first album but left during production and was credited only as a guest on that release. The group recorded two albums, Nice (1992) and Apple Pie (1993).

== Discography ==
=== Albums ===
- The Honeymoon Suite (1993)
- Macho Champions (1994)
- Candypants Beach (1995)
- The Everyman's Fourth Dimension (1996)
- There's Your Heart (1999)
- The King's Buccaneer (2000)
- The Euro (2004)
- Last Year's Song (2005)
- Together (2013)
- Painted with the Mouth (2015)

=== Singles ===
- Golden Fingers, split 7-inch with Clag ("Bike"/"Running Amok"), Spit and a Half Spit 30 (USA 1995)
- The French Girl b/w Dreams Never End 7-inch: Mind Of A Child M.O.A.C. 009 (USA 1996)

== Members ==
Past and present members of Ashtray Boy:

- Randall S. Lee
- J. Niimi
- David Trumfio
- Liz Phair
- Thomas Tallis (also known as Thomas Ashelford)
- Neil Johnson
- Carla Bruce
- Mark King
- Jo Packer
- James Dutton
- Ian Wadley
- Tim Maher
- Andy Creighton
- André Hartmann
- Stephen O'Neil
- Dave Winer
- Stevie Kicks
- Ali Madani
- Angie Smear
- Toby Dutton
- Alec Marshall
- Nicole Thibault
- David Nichols
- Paul Brannon
- Brook Swaine
- Stefan Schutt
- Brad Cosier
