= Zaca Creek =

- Origin: Santa Ynez, California
- Genres: Country
- Years active: 1989–1994
- Labels: Columbia; Giant
- Past members: Gates Foss; Scot Foss; Jeff Foss; James Foss

Zaca Creek was an American country music group formed in 1989. The band consisted of brothers Gates, Scot, Jeff and James Foss. Their debut single, "Sometimes Love's Not a Pretty Thing," was their only song to reach the Top 40 of the Billboard Hot Country Singles chart, peaking at No. 38. It was included on their eponymous debut album, issued in 1989 on Columbia Records. The group was signed by Giant Records in 1992, who released their second album, Broken Heartland. The band broke up in 1994.

In 1991, Zaca Creek was shortlisted for the Academy of Country Music Award for New Vocal Duo or Group of the Year.

== Discography ==
=== Albums ===
Year	Album	Label
1989	Zaca Creek	Columbia
1993	Broken Heartland	Giant

=== Singles ===
Year	Single	Peak positions		Album
Year	Single	US Country	CAN Country	Album
1989	"Sometimes Love's Not a Pretty Thing"	38	41	Zaca Creek
1989	"Ghost Town"	58	50	Zaca Creek
1990	"Warpaint"	—	82	Zaca Creek
1993	"Broken Heartland"	70	—	Broken Heartland
1993	"Fly Me South"	—	—	Broken Heartland
1994	"Two-Wheel Pony"	—	—	Broken Heartland
"—" denotes releases that did not chart

=== Music videos ===
Year	Video	Director
1989	"Sometimes Love's Not A Pretty Thing"	
1989	"Ghost Town"	Dan Chaika
1990	"Warpaint"	
1993	"Broken Heartland"	Marc Ball
1993	"Fly Me South"	Zaca Creek
1994	"Two Wheel Pony"	
