= Evil Beaver =

US musical group

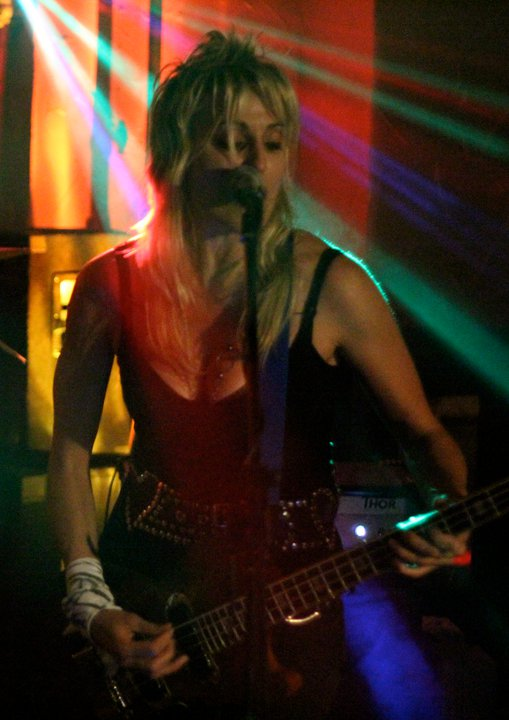
- Evie Evil of Evil Beaver performing in 2014

Background information
- Origin: Wicker Park, Chicago, Illinois, USA
- Genres: Rock, Punk rock, Alternative Rock, indie rock
- Instruments: Bass guitar, Drums
- Years active: 1999–2015
- Labels: Self-released, Independent, E. Lago Ent. Grp. Int., Johanns Face Records, Starry Records, Four Alarm Records
- Members: Evie Evil - Bass Guitar; Samuel Golf - Drums; Claude Coleman, Jr. - Drums
- Past members: Judy Coccuza - Drums; John "Jojo Beav" Jones - Drums; Gene Trautmann - Drums; Garry Ventura - Drums; Laura Ann Masura - Drums
- Website: www.facebook.com/evilbeavermusic

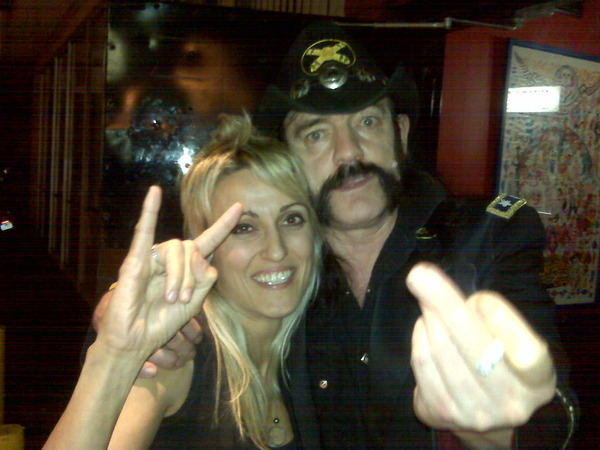
Evie Evil of Evil Beaver and Lemmy of Motörhead from 2010

Evil Beaver is a bass and drum based avant-garde punk band from Chicago. The band's only members, Evie Evil (bass and vocals) and Sammy Kickass (drums), met in the 3rd grade at Sieden Prairie Elementary School and started playing together in 1999. Since then, Evil Beaver has shared the stage with a variety of different musical artist including Nina Hagen, Jucifer, David J, Brick Layer Cake, The Muffs, Agent Orange, Chevelle, Fu Manchu, Peaches, Polysics, The Vibrators, Semi Precious Weapons, Shellac, Local H, UK Subs, Girl In A Coma, Murphy’s Law, Betty Blowtorch, The Gossip and The White Stripes. The band has toured the world, playing on four different continents, including a 10 show stint in Russia during the Sochi Olympics. Evil Beaver has released music on Johann's Face Records and Four Alarm Records in addition to releasing several works independently.

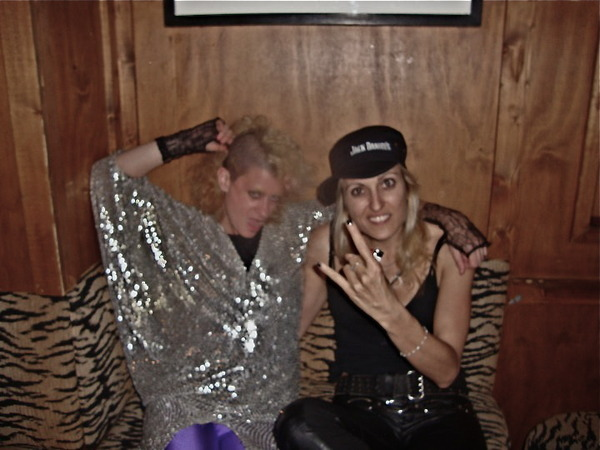
Evie Evil of Evil Beaver and Peaches

Professional ratings
Review scores
| Source | Rating |
|---|---|
| Allmusic | . |
| Allmusic | 4.0/5 stars |
| Allmusic | 4.5/5 stars |

== History ==
Evil Beaver was founded in 1999 in Chicago’s Wicker Park neighborhood by band leader Evie Evil. Evie is the sole songwriter for the band and featured on electric lead bass guitar and vocals, Samuel Golf (Slammin' Sammy Kickass), plays drums. Evie and Sammy began their friendship in the 3rd grade as classmates and playmates at Sieden Prairie Elementary School near Chicago, IL.

The group's debut, Smells Like Christmas Spirit was released in December 1999. Followed by a split LP with The Traitors in 2001, Evil Beaver released their debut LP, Lick It! on Four Alarm Records. Since then, three full-length records have been released: Pleased to Eat You (2003), In The Spirit of Resilient Optimism (2007), and Live in the Studio (2014). In 2006 the band released an EP titled Models of Virtue featuring drummer Gene Trautmann of Queens of the Stone Age and Eagles of Death Metal. The two were rumored to have been romantically involved during the production of the EP but separated shortly after its release.

In 2008 the band contributed a cover of Elvis's "Blue Christmas" for a compilation titled, Merry Xmas Dammit From the Double Down Saloon.

== Discography ==
=== All released music ===
| Date | Title | Label |
|---|---|---|
| August 15, 2000 | Album WLUW Breakthru Indie Radio: Evil Beaver | Independent with E. Lago Ent. Grp. Int., Jed James |
| October 5, 2000 | Album Live At The Manhole: Evil Beaver | Johanns Face Records, Independent with E. Lago Ent. Grp. Int. |
| February 6, 2001 | Album Lick It!: Evil Beaver | Johanns Face Records, Four Alarm Records |
| December 18, 2001 | Album Still Smells Like Christmas Spirit: Evil Beaver | Johanns Face Records |
| September 16, 2003 | Album Pleased to Eat You: Evil Beaver | Johanns Face Records, E. Lago Ent. Grp. Int. |
| June 14, 2006 | Single/EP Models Of Virtue: Evil Beaver | Independent with E. Lago Ent. Grp. Int. |
| January 2, 2007 | Single/EP In The Spirit of Resilient Optimism: Evil Beaver | Independent with E. Lago Ent. Grp. Int. |
| September 14, 2007 | Comp/Album Enlightening Without Dazzling/2 Berne Live: Evil Beaver | Independent with E. Lago Ent. Grp. Int. |
| November 14, 2013 | Single/EP Gross: Evil Beaver | Independent with E. Lago Ent. Grp. Int. |
| January 1, 2014 | Album Live In The Studio: Evil Beaver | Independent with E. Lago Ent. Grp. Int., Dave Trumfio |
