= The Pulsars =

American new wave/indie rock band

- Origin: Chicago, Illinois
- Genres: New wave, indie rock
- Years active: 1994–2000, 2009
- Label: Almo Sounds
- Members: Dave Trumfio; Harry Trumfio
- Website: www.thepulsars.com

The Pulsars was a new wave/indie rock band from Chicago, Illinois, led by Dave Trumfio and his brother, Harry Trumfio. They signed to Herb Alpert and Jerry Moss's Almo Sounds label and recorded two albums in the mid-1990s, one of which was released and another that has yet to be released.

== History ==
The band comprised the brothers Dave and Harry Trumfio, with Harry on drums and Dave producing, singing and playing all of the other instruments. The brothers had played together in bands since they were at school, and recorded at home. Trumfio named his synthesizers and electronic gear 'Theodore 9000', which he described as "the third member of our band", and the brothers considered 'T9000' as the name of the band before deciding on the Pulsars. Dave Trumfio had previously played in Ashtray Boy and the Mekons.

The Pulsars' first release was the Teenage Nites EP, on the Sweet Pea Records label in 1995. The EP was recorded at Chicago's Kingsize studio and contained “Owed to a Devil,” “Amb. 1 (153 Drive-in),” “Silicon Teens (Full Chord Version)” and “Amb. 2 (Teenage Nites).”

They were then signed to Almo Sounds in a US$2.5 million, three-album deal, with their first release for the label being the five-track Submission to the Master EP, on which label-boss Alpert contributed trumpet.

The band's self-titled debut album was released on Almo Sounds in 1997, and was described as "an album that's in the moment, behind the times, and looking to the future", with influences from the early 1980s such as OMD, Depeche Mode, and Thomas Dolby. However, critic Ritchie Unterberger viewed the band's sound as "considerably more enjoyable and warm" than their 1970s and 1980s influences, describing the album as "pleasant, catchy retro-new wave". SPIN's Eric Weisbard described the album's songs as "amazingly confident, catchy anthems". In the view of Trouser Press writer Ira Robbins:

"The album is one of the singular musical accomplishments of the '90s — with its combination of indelible melodies and seemingly pre-mature bedroom vulnerability and obsessions, it's a science fair version of Pet Sounds for the computer age."

Several of the band's lyrics dealt with futuristic topics such as robots, spaceships, and aliens. The debut album included "Tunnel Song", which was described as "a romantic ballad about the great highway tunnels of America", and "My Pet Robot", a love song to Theodore 9000. The band's sound has been described as "a schizoid patchwork of synth-pop, new wave and R&B". The band was compared with Pixies by Allmusic writer Nitsuh Abebe, and was likened to the Cars and the Cure by USA Today's Edna Gundersen. The band's live shows included dub interludes.

The band was described as "Chicago's pre-eminent new wave revival band" by the Chicago Reader, and "profoundly great" by Trouser Press.

The band split up before their second album was completed, with Dave Trumfio become increasingly busy with production work, but reunited for a one-off performance in 2009 at the Bell House in Brooklyn. The brothers reportedly had plans to complete the second Pulsars album, and were working again under the name Our Future.

On April 1, 2021, the Pulsars' Twitter and Facebook accounts announced the release of Lost Transmissions, a 15 track collection of rare and unreleased songs, available for pre-order through Bandcamp. It was released on August 1.

== Members ==
- Dave Trumfio – vocals, guitar, keyboards, programming
- Harry Trumfio – drums, keyboards, programming, backing vocals

== Discography ==
=== Albums ===
Year	Release	Reference
1997	Pulsars: Label: Almo Sounds; Date: March 25	
2021	Lost Transmissions: Label: Tiny Global Productions; Date: August 1	

=== Singles/EPs ===
Year	Release	Reference
1995	Teenage Nites EP: Label: Sweet Pea; Format: 7-inch	
1996	Submission to the Master EP: Label: Almo; Date: October 8; Format: CD	
1997	"Tunnel Song": Label: Almo; Date: February 18; Format: 12-inch	
1997	"Suffocation": Label: Almo (UK); Date: August 31; Format: 7-inch	
1997	Inland Empire EP: Label: Almo (Japan); Date: December 17; Format: CD	
1998	"Suffocation": Label: Almo (UK); Date: November 3; Format: CD	
