= Heavy Harm =

EP by Papa Vs Pretty
- Released: 13 August 2010
- Recorded: Albert Studios, Sydney, NSW, Australia
- Genre: Rock, indie rock, alternative rock
- Length: 19:29
- Label: Peace & Riot
- Producer: Paul Dempsey

Papa Vs Pretty chronology
Papa Vs. Pretty (2009)	Heavy Harm (2010)	United in Isolation (2011)

Heavy Harm is the third EP by Australian rock band Papa Vs Pretty. The album was recorded at Albert Studios in Sydney, Australia. It was produced by Australian musician and Something For Kate frontman Paul Dempsey in Sydney, and was mixed by Dempsey and Rick Will. The album was released by Peace & Riot in Australia on 13 August 2010, and was officially launched at a sold-out headline show at Sydney's Spectrum on 28 August.

A special pre-order package was made available for JB Hi-Fi customers online, including a signed copy of the EP and a limited edition poster. Album artwork was created by Melbourne design studio We Are Synapse. All tracks were written by Thomas Rawle.

== Singles ==
Professional ratings
Review scores
Source	Rating
Sputnikmusic	link
The AU Review	link
Press Record Online	link

The first single, title-track "Heavy Harm", was added to national rotation on Triple J radio in June 2010, and in July, an animated music video for the song by Melbourne design studio We Are Synapse was released online on YouTube, and added to rotation on Rage and Channel V.

Second single "Wrecking Ball" was added to Triple J national rotation in December 2010 and was named "Single of the Week" by iTunes Store Australia, on 22 December 2010. In late January 2011 an official music video for "Wrecking Ball", directed by Guy Verge Wallace and depicting life-size clay animation, was released online on YouTube.

== Track listing ==
No.	Title	Length
1.	"Heavy Harm"	2:39
2.	"Sgt. Suffer"	3:12
3.	"Wrecking Ball"	2:55
4.	"Piper"	3:02
5.	"Ask Yourself"	3:31
6.	"I Still Believe in Us"	4:10

== Personnel ==
- Thomas Rawle - guitar, vocals, keyboards, songwriting
- Angus Gardiner - bass, vocals, keyboards, violoncello
- Tom Myers - drums, vocals

=== Additional personnel ===
- Paul Dempsey - producer (all tracks), mixer (tracks 4 & 6)
- Rick Will - mixer (tracks 1, 2, 3 & 5)
- Reyne House - engineer
- Michelle Barry - engineer
- Anthony Laing - engineer
- Simon Struthers - mastering
- Dave May (for We Are Synapse) - art direction and design
