= Papa vs Pretty =

Australian rock band

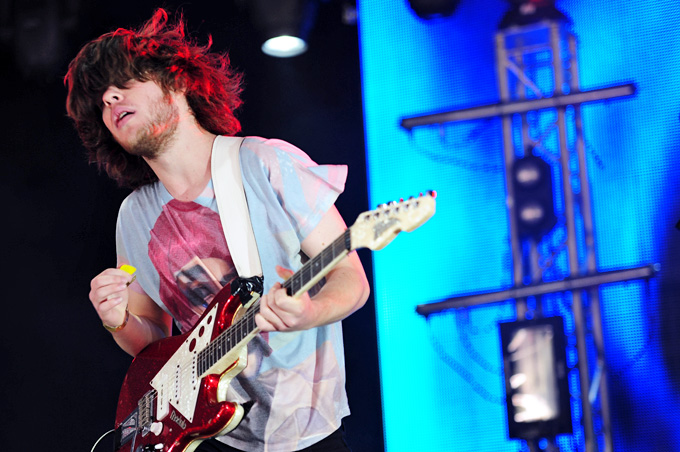
- Papa vs Pretty performing at the Southbound Festival in 2012

Background information
- Origin: Sydney, New South Wales, Australia
- Genres: Alternative rock, indie rock
- Years active: 2006–2014
- Labels: Peace & Riot
- Past members: Thomas Rawle; Angus Gardiner; Tom Myers; Luke Liang†
- Website: www.papavspretty.com

Papa vs Pretty was an Australian rock band from Sydney, New South Wales. Originally the solo act of then 15-year-old Thomas Rawle (lead vocals, guitar, piano, primary songwriter) in 2006, Papa vs Pretty became a three-piece band in 2008 with the addition of Rawle's friends Angus Gardiner (bass guitar, cello, backing vocals) and Tom Myers (drums, backing vocals), and a quartet in 2012 with the arrival of Luke Liang (guitar, keyboard, backing vocals). On Monday 30 June 2014, the band announced their breakup.

Papa vs Pretty's musical style evolved from the initial fusion of indie rock and electronica of their first two EPs, to a more guitar-driven alternative rock sound from 2010s Heavy Harm EP onwards.

Papa vs Pretty has gained notable attention in the Australian music scene for their "intimidatingly tight" and energetic live performances. Their 2010 tracks "Heavy Harm" and "Wrecking Ball" and 2011 singles "One of the Animals", "Honey" and "Darkest Way" received heavy rotation on Australian radio station Triple J.

Papa vs Pretty's debut album United in Isolation was released on 27 May 2011 to positive reviews, including a 9 out of 10 rating from Triple J Magazine and a coveted Triple J Feature Album slot. The album was nominated for Best Rock Album at the 2011 ARIA Music Awards, and for Album of the Year at the 2011 J Awards.

Papa vs Pretty released their second album, White Deer Park, on 21 February 2014. The first single from the album, "My Life Is Yours", was released 13 September 2013, followed by the second single, "Smother", which was released 6 December 2013.

== History ==
=== 2006–2007: Early years ===
Thomas Rawle developed a strong interest in music from a young age and began playing the drums at age 4, the piano at age 6, and the guitar at age 12. Writing his own songs and composing music from the age of 7, Rawle had access to basic digital recording equipment and gear because his father used to be an audio engineer.

In 2006, Rawle adopted the stage name Papa Vs Pretty to write, record, and perform his music under, creating songs which fused elements of electronica and indie rock. In 2007, Papa Vs Pretty, The Presence, in which Rawle wrote all songs and performed all instruments. The originally untitled EP received its name The Presence after Rawle delivered it to Sydney radio station FBi Radio heralding it a "present", and FBi mistakenly took that to be the name of the EP. The song "Citizen No. 1" received air-play on FBi, and the EP was well received by the local music street press; Drum Media's Liam Casey praised it saying "May god strike me down if this isn't the best thing I've heard this year".

In late 2007, Rawle invited friends Angus Gardiner and Tom Myers to join him as full-time members, playing bass guitar and drums, respectively, and Papa vs Pretty became a three-piece band.

=== 2008–2009: Papa vs. Pretty and From The Bunker (2008-2009) ===
In 2008, Papa vs. Pretty played sets at the 2008 Peats Ridge Festival, Parklife Festival, and the 2009 Laneway Festival.

In June 2009 they released their second EP, but first as a three-piece band, the self-titled Papa Vs. Pretty, which was positively received by local critics. A music video was released for the song "Ballad", featuring Australian actress Sophie Lowe. Later that year the band released an eight-part video series of live performances filmed in their rehearsal space, entitled From the Bunker, via Vimeo. This self-produced series of music videos showcased previously unreleased original songs, and a cover version of Prince's Purple Rain. The song "Piper" was featured on Triple J radio station, and was then later re-recorded to be released on their Heavy Harm EP in 2010.

=== 2010–2012: Heavy Harm and United in Isolation ===
By 2010 Papa vs Pretty had signed on to Peace & Riot. The band's third studio EP Heavy Harm, released 13 August 2010, was the debut release for Peace & Riot. Recorded at Sydney's Albert Studios in early 2010, the EP was produced by Australian musician and Something For Kate frontman Paul Dempsey, and was mixed by Dempsey and Rick Will. The first single, title-track "Heavy Harm", was added to national rotation on Triple J radio station in June 2010, and in July, an animated music video for the song was released online and rotated on Rage and Channel V. The Heavy Harm EP was officially launched at a sold-out headline show at Sydney's Spectrum on 28 August. The band toured heavily during 2010, embarking on a national tour supporting Paul Dempsey for his Burning Leaves tour in April 2010, as well as opening for Grammy Award-winning French band Phoenix at the Luna Park Sydney Big Top in March, and Silversun Pickups in Melbourne in September. In a July 2010 interview with FBi Radio, the band revealed that they were currently writing their debut album, set for a 2011 release. After capping off the year performing at 2010 Peats Ridge Festival and 2010 Pyramid Rock Festival, the band eventually entered BJB Studios in Sydney in January 2011 to begin the recording of their debut album. Throughout January they also performed at the 2011 Sydney Big Day Out, as well as opening for a string of Hot Hot Heat and Birds of Tokyo shows.

On 20 March 2011 the first-single from their debut album United in Isolation, "One of the Animals", had its radio premiere on Triple J with Richard Kingsmill. This was followed up with the official album announcement and a confirmed release date for 27 May 2011. Produced and engineered by five time ARIA Award winning producer Paul McKercher and mixed by Scott Horscroft, the album was released through Peace & Riot/EMI. Thomas Rawle has described United in Isolation as "almost a concept album", with a main lyrical "focal point". "In a very broad sense, it's about human nature's desire to always be coupled with another, and how love can sometimes be a vessel of selfishness. It's almost like animal behaviour, and I guess we are animals, just with language and ego". Various bonus, deluxe and limited editions of the album were released, including the United in Isolation (Deluxe Edition) iTunes LP featuring two bonus tracks and interactive artwork hand-drawn by Thomas Rawle, as well as a bonus limited edition 7 track EP titled Memoirs From A Bedroom: Issue 1, featuring previously unreleased Papa vs Pretty songs, from the band's vast catalogue of unreleased music. United in Isolation marked the first official release of a full-length Papa vs Pretty album, despite songwriter Tom Rawle having written and produced approximately 30 albums worth of material at home in his bedroom, which he hopes to release eventually.

Upon its release on 27 May 2011, United in Isolation met with positive reviews, including a 9 out of 10 rating from Triple J Magazine with the mature songwriting and production in particular praised. Awarded a 9 out of 10 by Triple J Magazine, it was also awarded the coveted Triple J Feature Album spot for the week beginning 30 May 2011. The album was nominated for ARIA Award for Best Rock Album at the ARIA Music Awards of 2011, in addition to being nominated for Album of the Year J Awards of 2011.

Papa vs Pretty toured Australia extensively in 2011, with several of their own headline tours, as well as touring with the Kaiser Chiefs and The Vines. The band contributed to The Wiggles tribute cover album, Re-Wiggled: A Tribute to The Wiggles, alongside other Australian artists such as The Living End, Jebediah, Sarah Blasko and Frenzal Rhomb, covering the track "Can You (Point your Fingers and do the Twist?)". In early 2012 Papa vs Pretty toured with the 2012 Big Day Out music festival along the East coast of Australia, and in February they supported Incubus on their Australian tour.

=== 2013–2014: White Deer Park and breakup ===
In March 2013 Papa vs Pretty began the recording of their second studio album, White Deer Park. Produced by Grammy-nominated producer Dave Trumfio, the band recorded at Studios 301 and Forgotten Valley Studios in Sydney, Australia, and then in April flew to Los Angeles, California to continue work at Kingsize Soundlabs. Over 80 new songs were written for the album throughout 2011, 2012 and early 2013, prior to the band entering the studio. White Deer Park was released on 21 February 2014. The album's first single, "My Life Is Yours", was released 13 September 2013, followed by the second single, "Smother", which was released 6 December 2013.

On Monday 30 June 2014, the band released a statement on their Facebook page announcing their breakup, saying "After almost a decade of making music as Papa vs Pretty we are sad to announce that all good things come to an end. It's been a privilege and a pleasure making music together and we'll continue to pursue our love of music and remain the best of friends. Thank you to everyone who has supported us along the way!"

== Musical style ==
Papa vs Pretty primarily play alternative rock and indie rock music, but have also integrated elements of grunge, hard rock, funk rock, and electronica in the past. Lyrically, Papa vs Pretty songs have been described as often dealing with themes of disenfranchisement, lost love, human emotions, technology, and the state of the world, however Rawle, whilst accepting these as legitimate interpretations of his lyrics, says he's never thought that much about what he writes.

Recognisable characteristics of many Papa vs Pretty songs include the focus on melodic backing vocal harmonies, lead vocalist Thomas Rawle's falsetto voice, and Rawle's intricate lead guitar work. As a guitarist, Rawle cites other guitarists such as Prince, Eddie Van Halen, Jimmy Page and Jimi Hendrix as inspirations, and has been himself described as a "shredder" and one for "grungy guitar riffs". As a whole, the band cite that they are influenced by many artists from a diverse range of genres, including Radiohead, Queens of the Stone Age, Daft Punk, Aphex Twin, The Smiths, The Mars Volta, At The Drive-In, Incubus, Prince, The Drones, Silverchair, Jack White, Jimi Hendrix, Grizzly Bear, Dinosaur Jr, Battles, Joy Division, Elliott Smith, Jeff Buckley, David Bowie, Talking Heads, Tom Waits, Pavement, The Reels, Roxy Music, Air, Vangelis, and Sergei Prokofiev.

Papa vs Pretty's musical style and sound has drawn wide-ranging comparisons to many different artists and genres throughout its evolution. Evolving dramatically since their conception, their earlier musical output has been described as much more experimental, indie and electronic sounding, applying a "deconstructuralist ethic... to traditional song structures," and creating "impulsive and spontaneous compositions". Their second EP, Papa Vs. Pretty, evoked comparisons to early Muse, Coldplay, Nine Inch Nails and R.E.M., and Silverchair. 2010's Heavy Harm EP saw the band shift towards a more guitar-focused and raw stripped-back melody-centric approach, described as "frantic guitar rock", with a grunge and classic rock inspired sound mixed with elements of Okkervil River style folk rock. Their 2011 debut album United in Isolation explored a dynamic dichotomy of loud, heavy and aggressive rock juxtaposed against softer and gentler music, drenched in an alternative rock sound reminiscent of such alternative rock luminaries as The Bends-era Radiohead, Jeff Buckley, Muse, Silverchair and "a handful of Australian Triple J bands from the 90's." The album is also notable for its prominence of guitar solos and vocal harmonies, drawing comparisons to Queen and The Darkness.

== Past members ==
- Thomas Rawle – lead vocals, guitar, keyboard, primary songwriter (2006–2014)
- Angus Gardiner – bass guitar, cello, backing vocals (2008–2014)
- Tom Myers – drums, backing vocals (2008–2014)
- Luke Liang – guitar, keyboard, backing vocals (2012–2014)

On 28 August 2018, Luke Liang died at the age of 28.

== Discography ==
=== Studio albums ===
Title	Details	Peak chart positions
Title	Details	AUS
United in Isolation	Released: 27 May 2011; Label: Peace & Riot (RIOTON004); Formats: CD, digital download	40
White Deer Park	Released: 21 February 2014; Label: Peace & Riot (RIOTON007); Formats: CD, LP, digital download	35

=== Extended plays ===
Title	Details
The Presence	Released: 2007; Label: Papa Vs. Pretty; Format:
Papa Vs. Pretty	Released: 5 June 2009; Label: Thomas Rawle Angus Gardiner Thomas Myers; Format: DD
Heavy Harm	Released: 13 August 2010; Label: Peace & Riot (RIOTON001); Format: CD, DD
Memoirs from a Bedroom: Issue 1	Released: 27 May 2011; Label: Peace & Riot (RIOTON005); Format: CD, DD
iTunes Sessions	Released: 28 October 2011; Label: Thomas Rawle Angus Gardiner Thomas Myers; Format: DD

== Awards and nominations ==
=== ARIA Music Awards ===
The ARIA Music Awards is an annual awards ceremony that recognises excellence, innovation, and achievement across all genres of Australian music.

Year	Nominee / work	Award	Result
2011	United in Isolation	Best Rock Album	Nominated

=== J Awards ===
The J Awards are an annual series of Australian music awards that were established by the Australian Broadcasting Corporation's youth-focused radio station Triple J. They commenced in 2005.

Year	Nominee / work	Award	Result
2011	United in Isolation	Australian Album of the Year	Nominated
