= Why Bother at All EP =

Why Bother at All

EP by Koufax
- Released: May 2, 2005
- Recorded: August 2004, March 2003
- Studio: Black Lodge Eudora, KS; The Loft, Saline, MI
- Genre: Indie rock
- Label: Motor Music
- Producer: Michael Krassner & Koufax

Koufax chronology
| Hard Times are in Fashion (2005) | Why Bother at All (2005) | Isabelle (2006) |

Why Bother At All is the second EP by American indie rock band Koufax. It was released in 2005 on Motor Music.

The song Why Bother at All was recorded for the album Hard Times Are In Fashion. It was also released as a CD-Single and as a 7" red translucent vinyl promo-single The first three songs were recorded in August 2004 at the Black Lodge Eudora-Studios in Kansas. Only the Joe Jackson-song Look Sharp was recorded in March 2003 at The Loft-Studio in Saline, Michigan.

== Track listing ==
All tracks are written by Robert Suchan except as noted.

EP Version

1. "Why Bother at All" – 3:16
2. "Call the Cops" – 2:39
3. "Loveless Meredith" – 3:02
4. "Look Sharp" (Joe Jackson) – 2:42

CD single

1. "Why Bother at All" – 3:16
2. "Call the Cops" – 2:39
3. "Loveless Meredith" – 3:02

7" vinyl single (promo only)

1. "Why Bother at All" – 3:16
2. "Call the Cops" – 2:39

== Music video ==
The music video was directed by Uwe Flade and shows the band playing in grey overalls in front of an art-screen-animation.

== Personnel ==
Band

- Robert Suchan – vocals, guitar, piano
- Jared Rosenberg – piano, organ, keyboards
- Ben Force – guitars, bass, background vocals
- Rob Pope – bass, guitars, background vocals
- Ryan Pope – drums, percussion

Technical

- Michael Krassner – production, recording (Tracks 1–3)
