= Memoirs from a Bedroom: Issue 1 =

EP by Papa Vs Pretty
- Released: 27 May 2011
- Recorded: Sydney, NSW, Australia
- Genre: Rock, indie rock, alternative rock
- Length: 28:52
- Label: Peace & Riot
- Producer: Thomas Rawle

Papa Vs Pretty chronology
United in Isolation (2011)	Memoirs from a Bedroom: Issue 1 (2011)	White Deer Park (2014)

Memoirs from a Bedroom: Issue 1 is the fourth EP by Australian rock band Papa Vs Pretty. It was released on 27 May 2011 as a limited edition EP alongside the band's 2011 debut studio album United in Isolation, as a bonus disc for JB Hi-Fi and Red Eye Records customers who pre-ordered the album.

The EP contains a selection of B-sides and demos of previously unreleased Papa Vs Pretty songs, written, performed and recorded by lead singer, guitarist and primary songwriter Thomas Rawle. The EP is Issue 1 of what the band hope will become a continued series of Memoirs from a Bedroom releases, although, ultimately was the solo released.

In May 2011, Rawle stated that he had written and produced approximately 30 albums worth of material at home in his bedroom, which he hopes to eventually release in the future.

== Track listing ==
No.	Title	Length
1.	"Passing Soul"	2:13
2.	"Uniform Deserve"	2:51
3.	"Nerve"	4:26
4.	"For the Benefit of the Beholder"	4:03
5.	"There Is Only Now (Look at Yourself)"	4:30
6.	"Heretic/Think About It"	6:43
7.	"Ark"	4:06
