= Sissy Bar =

American band

- Origin: Los Angeles, California, United States
- Genres: Indie pop, Rock, Lo fi
- Years active: 1994–2000
- Labels: Sugar Fix, Mootron, Love Kit
- Members: Courtney Holt; Joy Ray; Anne Kadrovich; Mary Ellen Mason; Brad Kluck; Patrick Simpson
- Past members: Lisa Papineau

Sissy Bar is an American indie pop band. They formed in Los Angeles, California in 1994 after founding members Joy Ray and Courtney Holt became obsessed with Snoop Dogg's then-hit Gin and Juice and recorded their own version on a friend's 6-track recorder, along with "(Our Pet Is...) Happy Pet" (both original recordings available as bonus tracks on the band's first full-length CD Statutory Grape). They sent this tape to local punk rock station KXLU and the songs started getting rotation on the Demolisten show, a show that plays "homespun, home recorded, self released recordings." The band's first performance was at a party in banjo player Brad Kluck's backyard. When drummer Patrick Simpson walked off the stage halfway through the set, the drummer from School of Fish (who was in the audience) jumped up on stage and helped finish the set.

The band's first release was 1995's Magic Bunny EP on Love Kit Records, a vinyl-only release that quickly sold out and garnered unsolicited reviews by publications including Details Magazine. Their 1996 debut full-length album was Statutory Grape and was produced by Mickey P. Original synth player and backing vocalist Lisa Papineau left the band partway through recording the debut album to pursue a major label deal with her other band, Pet, and was replaced by Mary Ellen Mason. Sugar Fix Recordings released this CD, which was named after a Mopar paint color from the 1950s and featured a purple target on the cover. Sissy Bar played at South by Southwest and North by Northwest in support of this album and gained in notoriety. They played with artists including Sukia, Tsunami, and Dirty Three and were part of the "Silverlake Scene" that spawned artists such as Beck, Geraldine Fibbers and Possum Dixon. They competed (tongue-in-cheek) in a Battle of the Bands that offered a major label deal to the winner, and narrowly lost to Save Ferris.

Sissy Bar's style varies because they "play whatever they feel like". Joy Ray describes their songs as "cute". One of their songs, "Bellman" featured on 1996 compilation album, Pop American Style. Another, "Trailer Song" featured on the soundtrack of 1999 comedy film But I'm a Cheerleader.

== Discography ==
- Magic Bunny EP (1995) – Love Kit
- Statutory Grape (1996) – Sugar Fix
- Sad to Say b/w Free to Be EP (You And Me) (1998) – Moo-Tron
- Songs for Peeps (1999) – Moo-Tron
