= Holiday Flyer =

- Origin: Roseville, California, U.S.
- Genres: indie pop, twee pop
- Years active: 1993–2002
- Labels: Silver Girl, Darla
- Members: John Conley (guitar, vocals); Katie Conley (vocals, percussion); Verna Brock (organ, piano, cello, flute, vocals); Michael Yoas (bass); Jim Rivas (percussion)

Holiday Flyer was an American Indie pop band formed in June 1993 by siblings John and Katie Conley. The band released their debut album in 1995. The band grew by one member for each of their next three records. Verna Brock (an alumna of Rocketship, Beanpole, and later the California Oranges) joined the group for 1997's The Rainbow Confection; Michael Yoas for 2000's You Make Us Go; and Jim Rivas (also of Rocketship) on, I Hope. Holiday Flyer disbanded in October 2002, with leaders John Conley and Katie Conley devoting more time to other projects, The California Oranges and The Sinking Ships.

== Discography ==
Albums

- Try Not to Worry, 1995 (Silver Girl, SG-021)
- The Rainbow Confection, 1997 (Silver Girl, SG-030)
- You Make Us Go, 2000 (Darla, DRL 088)
- I Hope, 2001 (Darla, DRL 119)

EPs and Singles

- Snowballing, 1994 (Fingerpaint)
- Sweet and Sour, 1996 (Darla, DRL 017)
- Blue Harvest, 1998 (Darla, DRL 058)

Compilations

- Pop American Style, 1996 (March, MAR 024)
- The Verna Brock EP, 1998 (Papercut, PCT 005)

== More information ==
- Holiday Flyer on TweeNet
- Holiday Flyer on Allmusic
