= Papa vs. Pretty (EP) =

Papa Vs. Pretty

EP by Papa vs Pretty
- Released: 5 June 2009
- Recorded: Sydney, NSW, Australia
- Genre: Indie rock, alternative rock
- Length: 19:06
- Label: Thomas Rawle Angus Gardiner Thomas Myers

Papa vs Pretty chronology
The Presence EP (2007)	Papa Vs. Pretty (2009)	Heavy Harm (2010)

Papa Vs. Pretty is a 2009 self-titled EP by Australian rock band Papa vs Pretty. It is the second EP released under the Papa vs Pretty name (after Thomas Rawle's The Presence EP in 2007), but it is often referred to as the band's first EP, since it was the first Papa vs Pretty release to feature bassist Angus Gardiner and drummer Tom Myers.

The EP was positively received by local and online music critics, evoking comparisons to early Muse, Coldplay, Nine Inch Nails, R.E.M., and Silverchair. A music video was released for the song "Ballad", featuring Australian actress Sophie Lowe.

== Track listing ==
No.	Title	Length
1.	"Ballad"	2:47
2.	"Sleep (Again)"	3:38
3.	"Citizen #1"	4:12
4.	"Arrestem"	4:46
5.	"Shoot"	3:41
