= Certain Distant Suns =

- Origin: Chicago, Illinois, USA
- Genres: Alternative rock
- Years active: 1989–1996
- Labels: CDM; Giant Records (1990); Warner Music Group
- Past members: Justin Mroz; Lance Stewart; Jared Mroz; Dan Zigmund; Kerry Finerty

Certain Distant Suns is an alternative rock band that was present on the Chicago music scene of the early 1990s.

== 1989–1991 ==
Justin Mroz (vocals, guitar) and Lance Stewart (bass, vocals) formed Certain Distant Suns in 1989 in Fox Lake, Illinois. The duo made early recordings with producer Dave Trumfio, and used keyboards & sequencers to back up their live performances at Chicago venues like Medusa’s -- the nightclub once located at School & Sheffield. Justin later recruited his cousin Jared Mroz (drums) and added guitarists Dan Zigmund and Kerry Finerty.

== 1992–1997 ==
Certain Distant Suns played locally in Chicago before self-releasing the EP Huge. The follow-up EP, Dogrocket, featured the singles "Bitter", "Talk" and "Snowfall At The Most Curious Times", received a good deal of college & alternative rock airplay, and brought the band to the height of their popularity. Both of these EPs were collected, along with extra tracks, on the 1994 full-length Happy on the Inside, released by Warner subsidiary Giant Records. In reviewing the album, CMJ New Music Report said the band "dance[s] around categorization like a cat across a bed of hot coals".

The group was dropped by Giant in 1996 as a result of label restructuring, and the group's membership changed as a result. Mroz continued with a new lineup (Jason Lee on guitar and keyboards, Brian Skaggs on bass, and Jon Hemmer on drums. The band's final release was the Boss Nova EP, issued in 1996.

== Discography ==
=== Cassettes ===
- Crushed (1990)
- Huge e.p. (1992)

=== CDs ===
- Huge e.p. (1992)
- Dogrocket e.p. (1993)
- Happy On The Inside (Giant, 1994)
- Boss Nova (1996)

=== Singles ===
- "Miserable" / "The One" (1989)
- "Bitter" (1994)
