= Nice (band) =

- Origin: Sydney, New South Wales, Australia
- Genres: Indie rock, pop rock
- Years active: 1991–1994
- Labels: Feel Good All Over
- Past members: Randall Lee; Susannah; Stewart-Lindsay; Francesca Bussey; Jo Packer; Mark King

Nice was an Australian indie rock band which formed in 1991. The band was fronted by Randall Lee formerly of The Cannanes and later of Ashtray Boy on vocals and guitar; Susannah Stewart-Lindsay, previously a member of the Adelaide-based band, Rewind on the Paranoid Side, on guitar; and Jo Packer on drums. Francesca Bussey, later a member of The Cannanes, was a member of Nice on bass guitar during the recording sessions for their first album, Nice (1992), but left during production and was credited only as a guest. Bussey was replaced on bass guitar by Mark King.

Allmusic's Nitsuh Abebe felt that Nice, which was issued by United States label, Feel Good All Over, showed that "Lee's dark jangle sounds absolutely stunning, and while the record's songwriting isn't as consistent as one might hope, the majority of it works incredibly well, with unconventional time signatures and progressions keeping things from falling into strummy banality". "Dear John", which was the lead track on Nice, was covered by the band Aden. The band's songs "Theme from Nice" and "Circuit Diagram" from the same album were included in the popular 1990s Nickelodeon show The Adventures of Pete & Pete. Adebe described Apple Pie, Nice's second and final album, as "a step toward the more varied pop sound" of Lee's future work with Ashtray Boy.

== Discography ==
- Nice (1992)
- Apple Pie (19 October 1993)
