= Nice (Nice album) =

Studio album by Nice
- Released: September 27, 1992
- Genre: Indie rock
- Label: Feel Good All Over (FGA 11)

Nice chronology
Nice (1992)	Apple Pie (1993)

Professional ratings
Review scores
Source	Rating
Allmusic	link

Nice is a 1992 studio album by the Australian band of the same name.

The songs "Theme from Nice" and "Circuit Diagram" were featured in the 1990s Nickelodeon television series The Adventures of Pete & Pete.

== Track listing ==
1. "Dear John" – 3:00
2. "Head in the Hay" - 2:39
3. "All for You" – 2:56
4. "Caress Me" – 2:38
5. "Anthem" – 3:10
6. "Theme from Nice" – 3:17
7. "Circuit Diagram" – 3:49
8. "Oversized Hen" – 2:26
9. "No Drinkin' Buddies" – 2:29
10. "Christiana Amore" – 4:19
11. "Pastoral Disaster" – 3:10
12. "Return to Nice" – 4:57
