= Apple Pie (album) =

Compilation album by Nice
- Released: 1993
- Recorded: November 1991–December 1992
- Genre: Indie rock
- Label: Feel Good All Over (FGA 69)

Nice chronology
| Nice (1992) | Apple Pie (1993) |

Professional ratings
Review scores
| Source | Rating |
|---|---|
| Allmusic | 3/5 stars |

Apple Pie is a 1993 album by the Australian indie rock band Nice.

== Track listing ==
1. "Casandra Nova" – 2:52
2. "Mr. Lee" – 2:51
3. "Cup of Coffee" – 2:35
4. "On My Back in the Madhouse" – 4:30
5. "Total Moon" – 3:28
6. "My Perfect Fire" – 4:03
7. "Hi Tension" – 3:00
8. "Curse of the Lees" – 2:25
9. "Seven Daze" – 3:34
10. "Doledrums" – 4:10
11. "Cunning and Sly" – 3:19
12. "Fucked Around" – 2:41
13. "Now" – 3:27
