= Die Alive =

2001 film by JF Leduc

- Directed by: JF Leduc
- Release date: 2001
- Country: Canada

Die Alive is a Canadian feature film directed by JF Leduc. It was shot on DV in 2000 and released on DVD in 2001.

Die Alive is a comedy that tells the story of a no-budget film crew attempting to shoot a horror film in an abandoned hospital that turns out to be really haunted.

According to director JF Leduc, it was originally intended to shoot the "movie-in-the-movie" that the characters are shooting over a three-week period. Just 24 hours before the "get go", it was announced that they could no longer get the hospital for the three weeks they had planned, but that they could still use it for free for the weekend.

The film was improvised over the weekend and cost about US$300 to produce (all costs included). The film was awarded a Guinness World Record as "Least Expensive Feature Film" ever made. It premiered at the Fantasia Film Festival in Montreal, was projected theatrically in Canada and Argentina, was shown to a pay-per-view audience on Hollywood.com and later released on DVD.

This record was printed in the 2005 edition of the Guinness Book of World Records.
