= Godzuki =

American rock band

- Origin: Detroit, Michigan, United States
- Genres: Alternative rock
- Years active: 1993–1999
- Labels: March
- Past members: Corey Redhage; Erika Hoffman; Chris "Crispy" Fachini; Dion Fischer; Scott Michalski

Godzuki was an American rock band from Detroit, Michigan, United States, together between 1993 and 1999.

== History ==
The band was formed in 1991 by Erika Hoffmann (vocals, bass guitar, Farfisa organ, also of His Name Is Alive, Saturday Looks Good To Me, Monster Island), Chris "Crispy" Fachini (lead guitar, bass guitar, also of The Dirtbombs, His Name is Alive, Teach Me Tiger, Detroit Cobras, and Rocket 455), Dion Fischer (guitar, Moog, also of The Go, Infinity People, F' ke Blood, Tranzistors, The Dirtbombs, Wildbunch, and His Name Is Alive), and Scott Michalski (drums, also of Volebeats). They described their music as 'science rock'. The band's debut release was the "Toast" single in 1995. After two further singles, they released debut album Trail of the Lonesome Pine in 1996 on March Records, produced by Dave Trumfio, Warren Defever, and Matthew Smith. They followed this with the Free Wade EP, featuring Wade the Free Jazz Saxophonist. The band released a second album, Your Future in 1998. It was produced by Warren Defever, with cover art by Teen Beat's Mark Robinson.

== Discography ==
=== Albums ===
- Trail of the Lonesome Pine (1996), March
- Your Future (1998), March

=== EPs ===
- "First One" (1994), demo / (1998) Time Stereo
- Free Wade (1997), Go Sonic/Time Stereo

=== Singles ===
- "Toast" (1995), March
- "12 Inch Dance Mix" (1995), Binavsic - split 7-inch single with Asha Vida
- "Poinsettia" (1996), March
- "Les Temps de L'Amour" (1998), Disques Twist Pop - split 7-inch single with Outrageous Cherry
- "Your Future b/w Our Bears Electric?" (1999), Motorway
