= Koufax (band) =

American rock band

- Origin: Toledo, Ohio, U.S.
- Genre: Indie rock
- Years active: 1998–2012
- Labels: Vagrant, Doghouse, Rubyworks
- Members: Robert Suchan; John Anderson; Nathan Harold; Dustin Kinsey; Ryan Lallier

Koufax was an American indie rock band from Toledo, Ohio.

The band's style of music was mainly characterized by piano-driven rock songs with guitar accompaniment. Quite frequently the band also included synthesizers. Later, the use of wind instruments increased.

== History ==
Koufax were founded in 1998 (some sources also state that the band was founded in 1999). The band is named after the baseball legend Sandy Koufax. Koufax were founded by Robert Suchan (guitar / vocals), Sean Grogan (keyboard), Andrew Cameron (bass) and Dave Shettler (drums). The founding members are mainly from Toledo, Ohio. The band's self-titled debut EP was released in 1999 on independent label Doghouse Records, and got them noticed by The Get Up Kids, who signed them to their label, Vagrant Records subsidiary Heroes and Villains.

=== It Had To Do With Love (2000) ===
For recording the debut album “It Had to Do with Love” and the following tour, Jared Rosenberg joined the band as the second keyboarder. The band now focused on the use of piano and synthesizer. With Rosenberg in the band, the sound of Koufax changed substantially. Through his rhythmic and melodic playing the pieces are noticeably more dynamic and swinging, which continued for the next records.

In 2000, a tour with The Get Up Kids and The Anniversary was sponsored by Napster.

=== Social Life (2002) ===
For the second album there was a line-up change. Instead of Sean Grogan and Andrew Cameron, Benjamin Force joined the band as bass player, but also knew how to handle the guitar.

From May to June 2002, in just four weeks, the album "Social Life" was recorded, which addresses the topic of a social life with recreational drug use. Social Life was much heavier on the guitars than its predecessor. The album was released in October 2002 again by Vagrant.

Again, Koufax did the tour for the album together with the Get Up Kids.

Despite professionally recorded albums and numerous tours, Koufax struggled with being relatively unknown.

=== Hard Times Are In Fashion (2005) ===
In autumn 2004, Suchan moved from Ohio to Lawrence, Kansas and found the brothers Ryan and Rob Pope of the Get Up Kids as a new cast for the bass and drums section.

After two records on Vagrant (2000's It Had to Do with Love and 2002's Social Life), Koufax re-signed with Doghouse and released a third LP, Hard Times Are in Fashion, in 2005.

On this album, Robert Suchan addresses the infectious apathy spreading throughout the country. Suchan experienced this disinterest first-hand when he was a substitute teacher in American schools. Suchan recorded most of the material for Hard Times Are In Fashion in Prague. From the distance, he realized how much closer he felt intellectually to Europe.

=== Strugglers (2008) ===
For the next album Suchan put together a completely new ensemble from Lawrence, Kansas: John Anderson (drums), Nathan Harold (bass), Dustin Kinsey (synthesizers, guitars, mandolins) and Ryan Lallier (guitar). John Anderson had already worked on the previous Koufax-record and Dustin Kinsey used to work with The New Amsterdams. The band's fourth album Strugglers was released September 23, 2008 via Doghouse.

In contrast to its predecessors, it contains significantly more jazz elements. After Koufax withdrew from their musical activity, Nate Harold (2010) and Dustin Kinsey (2011) joined The Get Up Kids as touring members. The last stage activity was registered in 2010. The latest release is a live performance of the Song "Trouble will find you" on the compilation release Fearless Music in 2012.

Robert Suchan has repeatedly emphasized in interviews that he does not want to make music all his life or get rich with it.

"I'm not stupid enough to believe that I'll get rich with it." "It's a hobby for me, and if you commit yourself to making music, then you're a fool." - Robert Suchan

== Influences ==
In addition to the fusion of musical elements from 70's Rock, 80's New Wave and 90's Emo-Pop, Koufax have been compared again and again with artists such as Joe Jackson, Elvis Costello or The Cure, which the band did not reject.

In fact, Koufax played the Joe Jackson song “Steppin 'Out” at several concerts. It can also be found as a cover version on the Japanese release of It “It Had To Do With Love”. On the Why Bother At All? -EP the Jackson's song “Look Sharp!” is included as a B-side. From The Cure they covered the “Love song” a few times live. In addition, artists such as Ric Ocasek, Eddie Money, Bruce Springsteen, Morrissey, Supertramp, the Cars or The Smiths are mentioned as possible influences.

When asked if he was worried that other bands might steal material from him, Suchan replied in an interview: "In my opinion, that's the best compliment."

== Band members ==
=== Final members ===
- Robert Suchan – vocals, guitar, wurlitzer, organ (since 1998)
- John Anderson – drums, percussion, drum machine, background vocals (from 2008)
- Nathan Harold – bass, synth bass (from 2006)
- Dustin Kinsey – synthesizers, guitars, mandolin (from 2008)
- Ryan Lallier – guitars (from 2008)

=== Former members ===
- Andrew Cameron – bass, piano, keyboard (1999-2000)
- Sean Grogan – synthesizers, keyboard, organ (1999-2000)
- Dave Shettler – drums, percussion, theremin, synthesizers, bass, piano, background vocals (1999-2002)
- Ben Force – guitar, bass, background vocals (2002-2005)
- Jared Rosenberg – piano, keyboards, synthesizers, organ (2000-2006)
- Rob Pope – bass, guitars, background vocals (2004-2005)
- Ryan Pope – drums, percussion (2004-2005)

== Discography ==
=== Studio albums ===
- It Had to Do with Love (Vagrant, 2000)
- Social Life (Vagrant, 2002)
- Hard Times Are in Fashion (Doghouse, 2005)
- Strugglers (Doghouse, 2008)

=== Singles and EPs ===
- Koufax-EP (Doghouse, 2000)
- Let Us Know (2003) [promo only]
- Break It Up (2003) [promo only]
- Why Bother At All? (Motor Music Publishing, Rubyworks, Little Teddy Recordings, 2005)
- Any Moment Now (2008) [Download]

=== Other ===
- Reggie And The Full Effect / Koufax: Everyone Is Crazy / Minor Chords (Heroes and Villains/Vagrant2000) [Vinyl, 7" split single]
- Daytrotter Studio Sessions (2007) [Rock Island, IL] [EP, Download]
- Daytrotter Studio Sessions (2009) [Rock Island, IL] [EP, Download]
- Love Will Find You (Live At Fearless Music, NYC) (2012) [on Fearless Music compilation]

== Video-Clips ==
- 2005: Why Bother At All? (director: Uwe Flade)
- 2005: Isabelle (director: Travis Kopach)
