= United in Isolation =

Studio album by Papa vs Pretty
- Released: 27 May 2011
- Recorded: BJB Studios, Oceanic Studios, Sydney, NSW, Australia
- Genre: Rock, indie rock, alternative rock
- Length: 45:47
- Label: Peace & Riot
- Producer: Paul McKercher

Papa vs Pretty chronology
Heavy Harm (2010)	United in Isolation (2011)	Memoirs from a Bedroom: Issue 1 (2011)

Singles from United in Isolation
- 1. "One of the Animals" Released: 1 April 2011; 2. "Honey" Released: 4 July 2011; 3. "Darkest Way" Released: September 2011

United in Isolation is the debut studio album by Australian rock band Papa vs Pretty. It was released in Australia on 27 May 2011 through Peace & Riot. The album was recorded at BJB Studios and Oceanic Studios in Sydney, Australia, throughout January and February 2011. It was produced and engineered by five time ARIA Award winning producer Paul McKercher, and mixed by Scott Horscroft.

At the ARIA Music Awards of 2011, the album was nominated for Best Rock Album and it has also been nominated for Album of the Year at the J Awards of 2011.

== Singles ==
First single, "One of the Animals", had its radio premiere on Triple J with Richard Kingsmill on 20 March 2011, and a music video for the song directed by Byron Quandary was released online on 17 April 2011. The music video for "One of the Animals" was voted as Channel V's RIPE Clip of the Week for 18 April 2010, and was also added to rotation on Rage. "One of the Animals" was featured in iTunes Store's Must-Have Songs: April 2011 playlist, one of only three Australian artists in the 11-song collection. Singles "Honey" and "Darkest Way" have also received heavy radio rotation on Triple J.

== Reception ==
Professional ratings
Review scores
Source	Rating
Triple J Magazine	9/10 stars
AU Review	9/10 stars
The Brag	4.5/5 stars
Radar Radio	4/5 stars

Awarding the album a 9 out of 10 for Triple J Magazine, Christian Burling hailed their debut as being "worlds beyond their collective years, carried by youthful abandon, charisma and enthusiasm," and that the band had set the bar "ridiculously high". Giving a 4.5 out of 5 for The Brag, where the album was also awarded Album of the Week, Jonno Seidler wrote that the record "is orchestrated and aurally mapped to perfection," lavishly praising the often "exquisitely moody" songs and Rawle's vocal and "shredding" guitar talents. Nathan Jolly of The Music Network praised the album's production, saying "The twin attack of producer [Paul] McKercher and mixer Scott Horscroft makes for a mammoth sounding record," adding that, whilst "the sheer size of this album is what first attracts, it's the subtleties throughout that will give this album longevity." Jolly adds that the album thrives on its "space and size", found through the "perfect" marriage of the band's "poised delicacy" and "bombastic" rock elements. Mariam Digges of PagesDigital remarked that the album was "an earsplitting debut", and one "set to be a stand out Australian album for 2011." Reporting for the Australian Associated Press, Ross Purdie stated that "Without doubt ones to watch, the indie rock three-piece have created a confident and assured debut," foreseeing a "bold future for the band".

Sam Hagaman of Brisbane's Rave Magazine called it a "well executed" album, praising in particular the band's vocal talents, stating that "lead singer Rawle's vocals fall into a warm, easy sound so natural it belies his age; at times the tone could even be mistaken for a young Freddie Mercury." Hagaman also noted the "classic rock influences", "rawking, rampant guitar solos", and "the odd falsetto hit, male harmonies and a song-writing touch of ecstatic harmonic highs," reminiscent of The Darkness. Awarding the album 4 out of 5 stars and Album of the Week for Radar Radio, Declan Dickinson praised the album's "mixture of dirty, grungy guitar riffs with soaring vocal harmonies provided by the group's wealth of singing talent", and asserted that "whether they realise it or not, Papa vs Pretty are fast becoming a part of the Australian Rock music canon."

Many reviewers favourably compared the album to such alternative rock luminaries as The Bends-era Radiohead, Jeff Buckley "(both in their frenzied flight and simmering restraint)", Muse, Silverchair and "a handful of Australian Triple J bands from the 90's," whilst Dickinson positively described the album as "AC/DC meets Nick Cave."

== Concept and musical style ==
Conceptually, Thomas Rawle has described United in Isolation as "almost a concept album", with a main lyrical "focal point". "In a very broad sense, it's about human nature's desire to always be coupled with another, and how love can sometimes be a vessel of selfishness. It's almost like animal behaviour, and I guess we are animals, just with language and ego".

In regards to their previous releases from a musical perspective, bassist Angus Gardiner likens the band's musical evolution evident throughout United in Isolation as "like a windy road that’s slowly becoming straight. At the start we were covering so much ground and now it’s all sort of funnelling into one direction". Adding to the discussion of the more focused musical direction of United in Isolation, singer/guitarist Thomas Rawle said "I feel like people couldn’t really gauge our direction before [with previous EPs] but now they should have a very good idea of what we’re about".

== Track listing ==
No.	Title	Length
1.	"Life's Got a Hold of Me"	4:04
2.	"One of the Animals"	3:39
3.	"Charity Case"	4:01
4.	"Look for Me"	4:15
5.	"Honey"	3:30
6.	"Conquistador"	3:11
7.	"I Felt Nothing"	4:16
8.	"Darkest Way"	3:30
9.	"Bitter Pill"	6:07
10.	"Suit & Burn"	3:17
11.	"You Are Not in Love Anymore"	5:57

== Charts ==
Chart (2011)	Peak position
Australian Albums (ARIA)	40

== Personnel ==
- Thomas Rawle – guitar, vocals, keyboards
- Angus Gardiner – bass, vocals, keyboards, violoncello
- Tom Myers – drums, vocals

=== Additional personnel ===
- Paul McKercher – producer, engineer
- Jean-Paul Fung – assistant engineer
- Scott Horscroft – mixer
