= Hard Times Are in Fashion =

Hard Times are in Fashion

Studio album by Koufax
- Released: August 9, 2005
- Recorded: October 2004 – February 2005
- Studio: Various
- Genre: Indie rock
- Length: 39:57
- Label: Doghouse
- Producer: Michael Krassner

Koufax chronology
Social Life (2002)	Hard Times are in Fashion (2005)	Strugglers (2008)

Hard Times are in Fashion is the third studio album by the American indie rock band Koufax.

== Background ==
When Koufax began recording their third album, this happened without a valid record deal. As a result, the band had to pre-finance the recording costs from their own pockets. They worked in six different studios. The band was also currently undergoing a line-up change. From the now disbanding but friendly band The Get Up Kids, the brothers Rob and Ryan Pope joined the band for the drums and bass section.

No Koufax album features as many guest musicians as this one. For example, the album was recorded with three different drummers. Guitar and piano work was also added from outside. For the first time on a Koufax album a pedal steel guitar can be heard.

Finally, the finished album was handed over to Doghouse (distribution in the USA) and to Motormusic (distribution in Europe).

== Track listing ==
All tracks are written by Robert Suchan

No.	Title	Length
1.	"Why Bother at All"	3:11
2.	"Back and Forth"	3:37
3.	"Isabelle"	3:57
4.	"Blind Faith"	3:35
5.	"Get Us Sober"	3:56
6.	"Five Years of Madness"	3:15
7.	"Trouble Will Find You"	3:21
8.	"Stephen James"	3:15
9.	"A Sad Man's Face"	4:06
10.	"Her Laughter"	4:15
11.	"Colour Us Canadian"	3:29
Total length:		39:57

== Reception ==
The album received mainly positive reviews:

"Hard Times are in Fashion ratcheted up the energy a bit, while also expanding their sonic palate with some pedal-steel. [...The record] deserves to be heard by more ears, so seek it out if you like your pop music smart, clever and infectious." - Waxing Nostalgic

"While Jared Rosenberg's piano is omnipresent, it isn't abused in Ben Folds Five fashion or used as an overly sappy device à la Keane or Coldplay. Instead, it's merely another instrument, sometimes battling Suchan and Ben Force's guitars point for point, other times blending deftly into the background. The album is infused with subtle political and social commentary, relating mostly to the war in Iraq, the Bush presidency, and foreigners' apparent increasing disgust with The American Way. But Koufax don't pound a listener over the head with their politics." - Allmusic

"They, too, don't wanna be to be American idiots. It may not be fair to call Hard Times Are in Fashion a political album. While its nervy pop songs are very much products of the current post-election depression, Koufax is more concerned with confronting a nation's mass apathy than outlining a revolution." - Popmatters

== Personnel ==
=== The Band ===
- Robert Suchan – vocals, guitar, piano
- Jared Rosenberg – piano, organ, keyboards
- Ben Force – guitars, bass, background vocals
- Rob Pope – bass, guitars, background vocals
- Ryan Pope – drums, percussion

=== Additional musicians ===
- Matthew Casebeer - organ, piano on "Isabelle", "Blind Faith" and "Get Us Sober"
- John Anderson – drums on "Get Us Sober" and "A Sad Man's Face"
- Davey Latter – drums on "Her Laughter"
- Eric Heywood – pedal-steel-guitar
- Michael Krassner – guitars, production (see below)

=== Technical ===
- Michael Krassner – production, recording, mixing
- Ken Sluiter – mixing
