= Motorhome (band) =

American pop band

Motorhome was an American distorted pop band formed in the early 1990s by Josiah Mazzaschi after he moved from Boston to Chicago to attend the School of the Art Institute of Chicago. Josiah met Kristen Thiele at art school. They were joined by Laura Masura on drums. They were initially courted and groomed for a major label deal that never panned out. Motorhome released two albums, "Sex Vehicle" on the Dirt label, and "Man of the Future" by themselves.

Josiah Mazzaschi later formed Light FM.
