= Bummer =

Bummer or Bummers may refer to:

- Bummer (album), an album by Cleopatrick
- Bummers, nickname of American Civil War foragers of William Tecumseh Sherman's army during its March to the Sea and beyond
- Aaron Bummer (born 1993), American Major League Baseball pitcher
- nickname of Hugh Stirling (1907–1994), Canadian football player
- Bummer and Lazarus, two stray dogs that roamed the streets of San Francisco, California, United States, in the early 1860s
- "Bummer" (song), by American rock band Sparks
- Bummer (band), American noise rock band
