= The Anniversary =

American rock band

- Origin: Lawrence, Kansas
- Genres: Emo, indie rock, alternative rock, emo pop
- Years active: 1997–2004; 2016; 2020; 2022; 2025
- Labels: Vagrant
- Members: Josh Berwanger; James David; Adrianne Verhoeven; Christian Jankowski; Justin Roelofs

The Anniversary is an American band formed in Lawrence, Kansas, in 1997 by Josh Berwanger, James David, Christian Jankowski, Adrianne Verhoeven and Justin Roelofs. The Anniversary was the solidification of a line-up that had been in flux for a year. After two years of playing shows across with the Midwest with bands that included The Get Up Kids, Braid and Superchunk, The Anniversary signed to Vagrant Records.

Originally perceived as a poppy, keyboard-driven emo band with the release of their debut album Designing a Nervous Breakdown in 2000, they developed a stronger, classic rock-influenced sound with the release of a split CD with Superdrag in 2001 and their second full length, 2002’s Your Majesty. After touring heavily throughout 2002 and 2003, The Anniversary began demoing tracks for what would be their third full length. But four years of constant touring and personal strains within the group led to the band’s demise in early 2004.

Four and a half years after their breakup, Devil on Our Side — a compilation of b-sides and unreleased tracks — was released by Vagrant Records.

== History ==
=== Formation (1997–1999) ===
In 1997 Anniversary formed as a five-piece band in Lawrence, Kansas. Josh Berwanger, Justin Roelofs and Adrianne Verhoeven began playing together in 1996 as The Broadcast. In January 1997, the band recorded a few songs including "Crazy Makes Us Sane". After struggling to keep a permanent rhythm section, Chris "Janko" Jankowski and Jim David solidified the line-up later that year as the band changed their name to The Anniversary, partly because a British group already had the rights to the name The Broadcast.

Featuring Justin and Josh on guitar and vocals, Adrianne on keyboard and vocals, Jim on bass and Janko on drums, The Anniversary developed and refined their signature sound – sentimental guy/girl vocals, complemented by dueling guitar lines, with synth pop overlays and catchy choruses – with heavy touring throughout the Midwestern United States in 1997–1999. In January 1998 six songs were recorded at Kingsize Studios in Chicago. In October of that year six more songs were recorded for a debut EP on Kansas City-based Urinine Records. The Get Up Kids approached them in the spring of 1999 with a deal to record a full-length album on their new Heroes & Villains imprint on Vagrant Records which they accepted.

=== Designing a Nervous Breakdown (1999–2001) ===
During ten days in July 1999 The Anniversary returned to Kingsize to record their debut full length, Designing a Nervous Breakdown. Later that July, at Red House Studios in Eudora, Kansas two more songs were recorded, one of which appeared in November 1999 on a split 7-inch with The Get Up Kids entitled Central Standard Time/Vasil + Bluey to precede the debut and help to build a national fan base.

Designing a Nervous Breakdown was released on January 20, 2000, and The Anniversary soon after departed on their first national tour with fellow band The Get Up Kids on January 26, currently popular for their album Something to Write Home About Touring relentlessly throughout 2000 and 2001, the band still found time to break away and record new songs. In March 2000 The Anniversary returned to Red House Studios to record a song later released on a split 7” with Hot Rod Circuit. In August three more songs were recorded at Red House – one released on the Another Year on the Streets Vagrant sampler, and two that were featured in the January 2001 Sub Pop Singles Club.

=== Your Majesty (2001–2003) ===
As they continued to tour and write new songs they gradually developed a more mature, classic rock influenced sound. In June 2001 The Anniversary recorded their second full-length album, Your Majesty, at Sonora Records in Los Feliz, California. Your Majesty marked a departure for the band, leaving the poppy, catchy melodies behind in favor of a more polished riff-driven classic rock sound.

Originally slated for a September 2001 release, the album was delayed because of a legal matter between Vagrant Records and their distributor. During this time, The Anniversary recorded three new songs in September 2001 for a split CD with Superdrag, the first in a series of split releases from Vagrant bands. The Superdrag split was released on November 13, 2001, to coincide with a national tour together, and Your Majesty followed shortly thereafter on January 22, 2002.

In between tours, a few tracks were demoed in Rob Pope’s basement in the fall of 2002. However, rather than re-signing a new contract, Vagrant Records dropped The Anniversary in early 2003 because of personal tensions with the label and other bands on the roster. But picking up right where they left off, through extensive touring with the likes of Cheap Trick and Guided by Voices, The Anniversary continued to develop their live sound as shows incorporated new songs and re-visited and re-worked past crowd favorites, transforming them into a psychedelic jam loaded with classic rock riffs and gutter rock swagger.

=== Breakup (2003–2004) ===
During the spring and summer of 2003 the band began producing demos for songs intended for their third full-length album. Around this time, they had signed to new management and received an offer from DreamWorks Records. The Anniversary continued to explore their songwriting prowess as they incorporated elements of reggae, blues, and even country. Before embarking on an October–November tour, they headed to Hideaway Studios in Sedalia, Colorado to record two tracks for the album. However, tensions within the band had been growing for some time, and The Anniversary played what would become their final show in San Antonio, Texas on November 23, 2003.

The band officially broke up in January 2004, and posted the following message on their website on February 6:

Hello everyone.
Due to a number of reasons, The Anniversary has broken up. This may take some of you by surprise, but it was a long time coming. We'll be selling stuff online a little longer so buy it up now because their [sic] collector's items. Thank you all for your support in our efforts to make the music world a better place. We just weren't prepared for it. Please feel free to check out this website www.theholyghosts.com. It's another project that Josh, Jim, myself, Casey from Hot Rod Circuit, and T.K. Webb are working on. Justin is working on some solo stuff right now. Here's a link to some of his new songs, click. Those of you on the e-mail list will receive updates from The Holy Ghosts from now on. Take care all and pleasant thoughts. Questions or comments may be addressed to theanniversary@hotmail.com.
Peace out, Janko

=== Solo projects (2004-2007) ===
Justin Roelofs formed a solo project called White Flight and released his debut album on Range Life Records on March 6, 2007.

Adrianne Verhoeven played in Fourth Of July and Art In Manila before recording (as "Dri") a solo record called "Smoke Rings", which came out on Range Life Records on November 6, 2007.

Josh Berwanger formed a band called The Only Children, which released "Change Of Living" in 2004 and "Keeper of Youth" in 2007.

=== Devil on Our Side and possible reformation (2008–present) ===
Nearly four years after the farewell messages were sent, a new blog was posted on The Anniversary's MySpace page on January 1, 2008, the first official communication from the band since the breakup. The band announced Devil on Our Side, a double disc compilation of unreleased songs, B-sides and rarities, released by Vagrant Records on June 24, 2008.

In 2008, Justin Roelofs recorded a sophomore White Flight record called "White Ark", which was never officially released. The "White Ark" singles "Panther" and "Children of the Light" were released in 2010, digitally on Range Life Records and as a 7-inch in the UK on Make Mine., In 2014 Justin and co-producer E*vax of Ratatat released a single as ABUELA on the label Canvasback.

In 2009 Adrianne and husband/producer Alex deLanda, formed a band based out of San Francisco called Extra Classic. Extra Classic has released two albums: 2011's Your Light Like White Lightning, Your Light Like A Laser Beam, released by Manimal Vinyl and Burger Records and 2014's "Showcase", released on their own imprint, Nopal Records.

Berwanger released the album "Strange Stains" (as Josh Berwanger) in 2013 on Good Land Records and the EP "Demonios" (as Berwanger) in 2015 on High Dive Records.

On March 22, 2016, the band created separate Facebook, Twitter, and Instagram accounts each with a profile picture that simply showed the band's logo and the year 2016, apparently teasing something on the horizon.

On March 28, 2016, it was announced that The Anniversary would join headliners Dashboard Confessional and Taking Back Sunday at the Taste of Chaos Festival on July 16, 2016, in San Bernardino, CA.

On September 8, 2016, the band kicked off its reunion tour in Boston, Massachusetts, at The Brighton Music Hall.

== Band members ==
- Josh Berwanger – vocals, guitar
- Justin Roelofs – vocals, guitar
- Adrianne Verhoeven – keyboards, vocals
- James David – bass guitar
- Christian Jankowski – drums
- Ricky Salthouse – guitar (replaced Justin on 2016 and later reunion tours)

== Discography ==
Year	Title	Type	Label
1998	"The Anniversary/Proudentall Split"	Split EP	Paper Brigade Records
1999	"Central Standard Time/Vasil + Bluey"	Split EP	Vagrant Records
2000	"Fall Tour EP"	EP	Vagrant Records
2000	Designing a Nervous Breakdown	Album	Vagrant Records
2001	"Sub Pop Singles Club"	EP	Sub Pop
2001	"The Anniversary/Superdrag Split"	Split EP	Vagrant Records
2002	Your Majesty	Album	Vagrant Records
2002	"The Anniversary/Hot Rod Circuit Split"	Split EP	Vagrant Records
2003	"100 Ships"	Single	Devil in the Woods Magazine
2008	Devil on Our Side: B-Sides & Rarities	Compilation	Vagrant Records

=== Compilation appearances ===
Year	Album	Songs Featured	Record label
2000	It Certainly Was a Grand Piano	"Low Tide and Hospital Bed"	Abominable Records
2000	Another Year on the Streets	"D in Detroit" and "I Believe That the End of the Reign of Terror is Soon Near"	Vagrant
2000	No-Fi Trash	"Hold Me Tonight"	Floppy Cow Records
2001	Another Year On The Streets, Vol. 2	"Sweet Marie"	Vagrant
2008	Vagrant Records Sampler	"To Never Die Young"	Vagrant
