= The ACBs =

American indie pop band

- Origin: Kansas City, Missouri, United States
- Genres: indie rock, indie pop
- Years active: 2007–2014
- Labels: High Dive Records
- Members: Konnor Ervin; Bryan McGuire; Kyle Rausch; Andrew Connor; Ross Brown
- Past members: Cory Egan; Matt Saladino

The ACBs are an American indie pop band from Kansas City, Missouri. The two constant members of the group have been lead singer and songwriter Konnor Ervin and bassist Bryan McGuire.

== Band history ==
=== Early years ===
The ACBs came together in 2006 after many years of playing in and around the Kansas City area with shuffling lineups and under different names. They self-released the eponymous The ACBs in November 2006. The album is noted for its guitar driven, pop-rock sound and the melodic hooks that comprised much of their early sound.

In 2011 the band recorded Stona Rosa after Egan and Saladino left the band to pursue careers in Los Angeles, California. The album marked a more mature change in their sound and content and drifted away from the guitar-driven sound of their first album. They soon recruited guitarist Andrew Connor of the indie rock band Ghosty and local drummer Kyle Rausch to fill out the group. The single "Be Professional" from the album appeared on an episode of MTV's The Inbetweeners.

=== Later years ===
In 2012, band members Konnor Ervin and Kyle Rausch formed another band, Shy Boys.

In 2013 the band signed with High Dive Records and headed into Westend Recording Studios in Kansas City, Kansas to record Little Leaves. The album displayed a variety of influences and the sounds heard on the album range from 1960s era pop to funk. The conceptual nature of the album also addresses issues of depression, anxiety, and alienation inside of a pop music framework. Two acoustic ballads bookend the first side of Little Leaves and one of them, "All Over," was featured on an episode Showtime's Shameless.

== Discography ==
The ACBs

- Released: 2006
- Format: CD
- Label: Self-Released

Stona Rosa

- Released: 2010
- Format: CD/Vinyl
- Label: Self-Released

Little Leaves

- Released: 2013
- Format: CD/Vinyl
- Label: High Dive Records
