= Before Our Hearts Explode! =

Studio album by Fourth of July
- Released: August 21, 2010
- Studio: The Bullhouse in Lawrence, Kansas
- Genre: Indie rock, folk rock
- Length: 40:33
- Label: Range Life
- Producer: Colin Mahoney

Fourth of July chronology
Fourth of July on the Plains (2007)	Before Our Hearts Explode! (2010)	Empty Moon (2013)

Before Our Hearts Explode! is the second album by Lawrence, Kansas-based band Fourth of July. It was released August 31, 2010 on Range Life Records.

== Track listing ==
All lyrics are written by Brendan Hangauer; all music is composed by Fourth of July

No.	Title	Length
1.	"Friend of a Friend"	03:44
2.	"Bad Dreams (Are Only Dreams)"	03:15
3.	"Providence"	04:27
4.	"I Don't Want To Lose You"	02:56
5.	"Self Sabotage"	02:59
6.	"Song For Meghan"	03:48
7.	"Moving On"	03:15
8.	"Tan Lines"	04:00
9.	"L Train"	03:15
10.	"Crying Shame"	03:58
11.	"Come Home"	04:56
Total length:		40:33

== Personnel ==
- Brendan Hangauer - guitar, vocals
- Patrick Hangauer - bass
- Kelly Hangauer - trumpet, keys, vocals
- Brian Costello - drums, vocals
- Steve Swyers - guitar
- Paul Gold - mastering
- Zach Hangauer - mixing
- Colin Mahoney - recording, mixing
- Paul Gold - mastering
- Adrian Verhoeven - vocals (tracks 3, 6, 7, & 9)
- Katlyn Conroy - vocals (tracks 2, 10)
- Pre Sense Form - album design
- Sara McManus - cover
