= Fourth of July on the Plains =

Studio album by Fourth of July
- Released: June 5, 2007
- Label: Range Life

Fourth of July chronology
Fourth of July on the Plains (2007)	Before Our Hearts Explode! (2010)

Fourth of July on the Plains is the debut album by Lawrence, Kansas-based band, Fourth of July. It was released June 5, 2007 on Range Life Records.

== Track listing ==
1. "Be Careful"
2. "Can't Sleep"
3. "Surfer Dude"
4. "Why Did I Drink So Much Last Night?"
5. "Long Gone"
6. "In Debt"
7. "Purple Heart"
8. "She's in Love"
9. "The Faint"
10. "Like a Tiger"
11. "Killer Bees"
12. "Pimps in Paris"
