= Your Majesty (disambiguation) =

Your Majesty is a style of address.

Your Majesty may also refer to:

- Your Majesty (album), a 2002 album by indie rock band The Anniversary
- Your Majesty (horse), a racehorse
