= White flight (disambiguation) =

White flight is the social phenomenon of white people migrating away from racially mixed regions.

White flight may also refer to:

- White Flight (band), musical artist and the name of his 2007 album
- "White Flight", a nickname for Gene Kranz, NASA flight director
- White Flight Control Room at NASA's Christopher C. Kraft Jr. Mission Control Center
