= Range Life =

Range Life may refer to:

- Range Life (song), a song by Pavement
- Range Life Records, a record label named after the Pavement song
