= The Heart Is a Lonely Hunter (disambiguation) =

The Heart Is a Lonely Hunter is a 1940 novel by Carson McCullers.

The Heart Is a Lonely Hunter may also refer to:

- The Heart Is a Lonely Hunter (film), a 1968 adaptation of McCullers's novel
- "The Heart Is a Lonely Hunter" (Once Upon a Time), a television episode
- "The Heart Is a Lonely Hunter" (song), by Reba McEntire, 1994
- "The Heart Is a Lonely Hunter", a song by Delta 5, 1982
- "The Heart Is a Lonely Hunter", a song by The Anniversary from Designing a Nervous Breakdown, 2000
- "The Heart's a Lonely Hunter", a song by Thievery Corporation and David Byrne from The Cosmic Game, 2005
- "The Heart Is a Lonely Hunter", a song by Nerina Pallot, 2017
- "The Heart Is a Lonely Hunter", a song by The Divine Comedy, from Rainy Sunday Afternoon, 2025
