= Dutch lunch =

Meal primarily focused on delicatessen foods

A Dutch lunch is a meal primarily focused on delicatessen foods such as cured meats, cheeses, and sausages, and occasionally alcohol.

Merriam-Webster describes it as "an individual serving of assorted sliced cold meats and cheeses".

There has been controversy on whether the term "Dutch" refers to a meal in the Netherlands style or the German style.

== History ==
=== 19th century ===
In 1851, the term possibly had not yet acquired its meaning: William and Robert Chambers's Edinburgh Journal used the term to describe an authentic meal in the Netherlands home of Madame Leemans; her lunch mainly consisted of coffee and biscuits.

In 1871, the Peep o' Day House tavern at 903 Shipley Street in Wilmington, Delaware advertised a Dutch lunch.

On the evening of December 30, 1881, Mrs. Geo. T. Hunter hosted a Dutch lunch in honor of the resident and visiting members of the Phi Delta Theta fraternity.

In 1896, the Colorado State Medical Society hosted a Dutch lunch, which included "appetizing, if somewhat indigestible viands," concluding their report with Dum vivimus vivamus.

The Bay View Magazine contrasts a "real" Dutch lunch and an Americanized Dutch lunch, both of which took place in 1897.

=== 1899 ===
In 1899, the Western Paper Box Makers' Association served a Dutch lunch in the evening, which included "Cheese of all kinds, pretzels, smearcase, Frankfurters, and other kinds of sausages; rye bread, and, of course, beer." At the same luncheon, multiple pranks occurred: this included Cincinnati boxmaker C. L. La Boideaux getting his hair surreptitiously covered with pepper; when he began to sneeze, he reached for his handkerchief and "found that his pocket was filled with sausages." Meanwhile, another professional stood to make a speech and "found his pocket filled with spoons."

In October 4 of the same year, the Philadelphia Whist Club's opening night had 16 tables of card games; the featured game was Compass, followed by a Dutch lunch.

On May 2 of the same year, members of the St. Louis Photo Engravers Association held a "genuine Dutch lunch" for its members consisting of an "elegant" meal and several kegs of beer. A band titled "Down South Darkies," possibly a minstrel show that involved the use of blackface, provided music for the event.

=== 20th century ===
Circa 1909, the Bismarck Hotel restaurant in Chicago, Illinois served a Dutch Lunch that included Astrakhan caviar, game soup, blue trout with Hollandaise sauce, truffled grouse, fried calves' brains with apple sauce, turkey slices, cranberries, assorted cakes, cheese, fruit, and coffee.

The 1914 American Waiter handbook's Dutch lunch menu includes rye bread, dill pickles, "red cold slaw", Herring salad, Schmierkase, sausages, cheeses, coffee, cigars, raw oysters, boiled trout in gelatin, pickled pigs' feet, and popcorn.

In 1934, Helen Gardner and middleweight boxer Tommy Gardner opened Tommy's Dutch Lunch in Walla Walla, Washington. The bar featured steak dinners, alcoholic beverages, and "soft drinks for the kiddies." As of 2023, the restaurant continues to operate under different ownership.

By 1936, the William Simon Brewery in Buffalo, New York claimed the Dutch lunch was "all the rage" for bridge parties, generally served with "sliced sausage, boiled ham, smoked tongue, thin wafers of cheese, dill pickles, potato salad, rye bread - and beer".

Circa 1938, Pool's Sandwiches on 6290 Sunset Boulevard in Hollywood, California displayed a possibly hand-painted facade reading "Special Dutch Lunch Sandwich".

== Controversy ==
While some sources describe Dutch lunch as being Dutch (i.e., Netherlands), the term also has been associated with "Deutsch" (i.e., German-language).

A 1907 letter to the editor of What to Eat, a Dutch (Netherlands) woman from Portland, Oregon claimed that "the term is understood to imply a German lunch," because "its name had retrograded from the German Deutsch." She argued that this occurred the same way that Americans colloquially said "Dutchman" meaning a German (Deutches) man.

In 1914, The American Waiter describes the meal as an Americanized German meal.

== In popular culture ==
In American cartoonist John L. Magee's 1865 cartoon Jeff Davis Caught at Last: Hoop Skirts and Southern Chivalry, a Union soldier threatens the disguised Jefferson Davis, "[Drop] that bucket and hood or I'll drop you quicker than a Duch lunch [sic] can slide down a Bummer's windpipe."
