= Your Majesty (album) =

Studio album by The Anniversary
- Released: January 22, 2002
- Recorded: June 2001
- Studio: Sonora
- Genres: Garage rock; neo-psychedelia; pop rock; space rock
- Length: 46:46
- Label: Vagrant
- Producer: Rob Schnapf

The Anniversary chronology
Designing a Nervous Breakdown (2000)	Your Majesty (2002)	Devil on Our Side: B-Sides & Rarities (2008)

Your Majesty is the second and final studio album by the American rock band the Anniversary. It was released on January 22, 2002, through Vagrant Records. Following the release of their debut studio album, Designing a Nervous Breakdown in early 2000, the band started writing new material by that August. They later recorded the album in June 2001 at Sonora Recorders in Los Feliz, California, with producer Rob Schnapf.

Your Majesty is a garage rock, neo-psychedelia, pop rock and space rock record that includes slow tempos, guitar solos and a grand piano; comparisons were made to the works of the full-band iteration of Elliott Smith, the New Pornographers, and the Kinks, among others. Leading up to the release of it, the Anniversary completed two US tours. The album was promoted with supporting slots for Guided by Voices, Dashboard Confessional and Cheap Trick, and two headlining tours by the band.

Your Majesty received generally positive reviews from music critics, some of whom commented on the male–female vocals and Schnapf's production. In the US, the album charted on two Billboard component charts. It peaked at number 15 and 17 on the Independent Albums and Heatseekers Albums charts, respectively.

== Background and production ==
The Anniversary released their debut studio album Designing a Nervous Breakdown in January 2000, through Heroes & Villains, an imprint of independent record label Vagrant Records that was owned by the Get Up Kids. By August of that year, the Anniversary were working on new material, which vocalist and guitarist Josh Berwanger said was acoustic-based and included electric piano from vocalist and keyboardist Adrianne Pope. The band went on the Heroes & Villains Fall Tour in September and October 2000, then took a two-week break before touring again until Christmas. They spent the period after Christmas writing further material for their next album. The Anniversary supported Hey Mercedes on their headlining US tour in February and March 2001. A week prior to recording the album, the band worked on pre-production with Rob Schnapf at a practice space; they played him every track and after each performance, the Anniversary went over parts and song structures.

Your Majesty was recorded in two and a half weeks at Sonora Recorders in Los Feliz, California, in June 2001. The band members shared a two-bed hotel room near the studio, which led to claustrophobia and frequent brainstorming. The band refrained from recording in their hometown of Lawrence, Kansas, because they felt the presence of their families and friends would be distracting for them. Schnapf acted as producer for the album and recording was handled by Doug Boehm; the recording was assisted by Andrew Boston. The Anniversary spent some downtime at Malibu Beach, where they wrote additional parts and a portion of lyrics. Schnapf and Boehm mixed the recordings with assistance from Pete Magdaleno at King Sound Studios in Los Angeles, California. Don C. Tyler then mastered the recordings at Precision Mastering.

== Composition and lyrics ==
All of the music on Your Majesty is credited to the Anniversary; all of the lyrics are credited to Berwanger and Justin Roelofs. The sound of Your Majesty has been described as garage rock, neo-psychedelia, pop rock and space rock; it also includes influences from progressive rock. While the album has been classified as emo, several reviewers noted the band had moved away from that style. Your Majesty is slower than Designing a Nervous Breakdown, with a straightforward rock sound, off-kilter vocal performances, and guitar solos. Parts of it drew comparisons to the works of a full-band iteration of Elliott Smith and Rufus Wainwright, the New Pornographers, and English acts the Kinks and Mott the Hoople. For the album, Pope switched from playing her Moog synthesizer to a grand piano and an organ.

Your Majesty begins with the rock tracks "Sweet Marie" and "Crooked Crown"; the intro of the latter is similar to the works of Weezer. "Peace, Pain & Regret" retains the upbeat energy of Designing a Nervous Breakdown. "Husam Husam" was compared to the music of Pink Floyd with its introduction, spacious keyboard parts and throaty backing vocals. The indie rock track "The Sirens Sings" includes guitar riffs that are similar to those of Neil Young. "Never Die Young" is an up-tempo pop song that most resembles the sound of Designing a Nervous Breakdown. "Tu-Whitt Tu-Whoo" is a love song that is followed by the folk-esque "The Ghost of the River". "The Death of the King" is a near-six-minute song with an instrumental ending that segues into "Follow the Sun", which consists of two lines. "The Death of the King" was written in a hotel bathroom at 1 A.M., with Berwanger and Roleofs playing guitars for the track in the dark. Both tracks are progressive rock-indebted numbers; "The Death of the King" evokes the sound of Pink Floyd.

== Release and promotion ==
In July 2001, the Anniversary appeared on the Vagrant Across America tour. On September 3 of that year, the track listing for Your Majesty was announced. Later that month, it was announced Vagrant had postponed the album's release from October 2001 to January 2002 at the band's insistence. In October and November 2001, the Anniversary went on a US tour with Superdrag and the Mars Volta. Your Majesty was intended to come out to coincide with this tour, but was delayed several times; with each delay, tension within the band mounted. Berwanger said the tour was "hell" for the band as they wanted to perform new material, but the audiences were not receptive to this idea. Your Majesty was eventually released on January 22, 2002; its artwork resembles that of the Beatles' Revolver (1966). The Anniversary played three shows with Guided by Voices in the following month, before supporting Dashboard Confessional on an eight-week tour in March and April 2002. In October and November of that year, the band went on a headlining tour with Burning Brides and the Gadjits. On November 19, 2002, Vagrant released a video compilation entitled Another Year on the Screen, which includes the music video for "Sweet Marie".

On March 7, 2003, the Anniversary said they had left Vagrant Records. In response, Vagrant's co-owner Rich Egan made a negative post on the record label's message board that was subsequently deleted. Egan followed the deletion up, saying the "relationship [with the band] had run its course". Berwanger said Vagrant and the Anniversary had "complete opposite ideas of what music should be", and that the record label admittedly had "no idea" how to market Your Majesty, to which Egan replied Vagrant should have had no difficulty promoting the album and that it out-sold Designing a Nervous Breakdown. In March and April 2003, the band supported Cheap Trick on their US headlining tour. In October and November of that year, they went on tour; the Natural History and the Vexers supported the first half, while the second was supported by Carrier and Apollo Sunshine. In late November 2003, towards the end of the tour, the Anniversary broke up.

== Reception ==
Professional ratings
Aggregate scores
Source	Rating
Metacritic	73/100
Review scores
Source	Rating
AllMusic	4.5/5 stars
E! Online	B
No Ripcord	4/10
Pitchfork	2.0/10
Rolling Stone	3/5 stars

Your Majesty was met with generally positive reviews from music critics. At Metacritic, the album received an average score of 73, based on 9 reviews.

Chart Attack writer Steve Servos said: "[g]one are the emo labels and in their place the band show off an appreciation for the classic pop-influences-rock sound". He was not surprised to hear "the full band version" of Elliott Smith because the Anniversary were working with Schnapf, "with a little Rufus Wainwright thrown in for good measure". CMJ New Music Report's Amy Sciarretto called the album an "ambitious, left-of-center" release with keyboard melodies that were used "in a different way" to the ones on Designing a Nervous Breakdown. She complimented Berwanger's and Pope's "absolutely lush vocal harmonies". The staff of E! Online said Your Majesty moves from the "tight, catchy end of the pop spectrum to airy, dreamy tunes", opining that Berwanger's and Pope's vocals keep the album from sounding "too same-y", and that in spite of the influences, the band "retain[s] its own personality, with a laid-back style and pizzazz that keeps this party a pleasant one".

AllMusic reviewer Heather Phares said the Anniversary expanded on "some of their artier tendencies and keeping the playful, hooky songwriting that made their debut so refreshing". Phares praised Schapf's "aptly lush" production work and said the band's "inherent, slightly awkward earnestness shines through at every turn". Stephen Rauch of PopMatters said that while Your Majesty retains the male–female vocals and keyboard from Designing a Nervous Breakdown, it is "a very different album" and the tracks are "more straight-forward". According to Rauch, despite the loss of up-tempo material in favor of "slower, more deliberate songs", it is "still a very good album". Rolling Stone writer Jenny Eliscu said Schnapf's and Boehm's work with Elliott Smith is apparent on Your Majesty, on which "a twinge of sadness turns even sunny tunes such as 'Never Die Young' slightly sour". Eliscu said the band "occasionally piles on a few too many layers of sounds" to some songs and that the lyrics often "sound like some drunken hippie-shaman shit".

Andrew Sacher of BrooklynVegan wrote that the "hooks are just as sticky as the ones on their debut LP, the harmonies are gorgeous, and sometimes the band sounds even more comfortable making this kind of music" than they did with their past work. Inlander's Mike Corrigan said Pope's "earnest, airy vocals are a nice compliment to the more affected delivery" of Berwanger and Roelofs on the album. He found the Anniversary to be lacking in "genuine passion and emotional depth", and said the album is "full of half-hearted performances, secondhand sentiments, mediocre writing and little, if any real soul". Joachim Hiller of Ox-Fanzine said Schnapf's production brought out the best in other musicians but had failed to do so with the Anniversary. He mentioned the Promise Ring's Wood/Water (2002), calling Your Majesty "only third rate" by comparison, saying it is "not a really bad record, just a pretty boring one". Pitchfork writer Brad Haywood said the music, "while pretending to be candy-coated pop-rock, shares all of emo's key indicators, including melodramatic vocal delivery, seamless production, and shameless overambition".

Commercially, Your Majesty reached number 15 on the US Billboard Independent Albums chart, and number 17 on the Heatseekers Albums chart.

== Track listing ==
All music by the Anniversary, all lyrics written by Justin Roelofs and Josh Berwanger. All songs produced by Rob Schnapf.

Your Majesty track listing
No.	Title	Length
1.	"Sweet Marie"	3:35
2.	"Crooked Crown"	3:48
3.	"Peace, Pain & Regret"	3:34
4.	"Husam Husam"	6:45
5.	"The Siren Sings"	4:36
6.	"Never Die Young"	4:01
7.	"Tu-Whitt Tu-Whoo"	2:29
8.	"The Ghost of the River"	6:28
9.	"Devil on My Side"	3:19
10.	"The Death of the King"	5:56
11.	"Follow the Sun"	2:28
Total length:		46:56

== Personnel ==
Personnel per sleeve.

The Anniversary

- Josh Berwanger – vocals, guitar
- Christian Jankowski – drums
- Adrianne Pope – vocals, keys
- Justin Roelofs – vocals, guitar
- James David – bass guitar

Additional musicians

- Rob Schnapf – guitar ("Follow the Sun")

Production

- Rob Schnapf – producer, mixing
- Doug Boehm – recording, mixing
- Andrew Boston – recording assistance
- Pete Magdaleno – mixing assistance
- Don C. Tyler – mastering
- Thomas Humphrey – design, art direction
- Todd Allison – photography

== Charts ==
Chart performance for Your Majesty
Chart (2002)	Peak position
US Heatseekers Albums (Billboard)	17
US Independent Albums (Billboard)	15
