= Ghosty (band) =

Indie rock band from Lawrence, Kansas

- Origin: Lawrence, Kansas
- Genres: Indie rock, Jangle pop
- Years active: 1999–present
- Labels: Future Farmer Records (USA); Broken Horse Records (UK); Low Transit Industries; OxBlood Records (USA); High Dive Records
- Members: Andrew Connor; Jeff Ferrell; David Wetzel; Mike Nolte; Josh Adams
- Past members: Richard Gintowt; Mark Hurst; Jacob Baum; Andrew Sallee

Ghosty is a Lawrence, Kansas-based indie rock band formed in 1999. They are best known for their positive reviews by NPR, Currently the Ghosty lineup consists of Andrew Connor (guitar, vocals), Mike Nolte (bass, guitar, vocals), David Wetzel (keyboard, guitar, vocals, tambourine) and Josh Adams (drumset). Ghosty completed a coast-to-coast tour of the United States at the end of 2006 and began working on a new full-length album, Answers, which was released on January 11. Their most recent self-titled album was released on High Dive Records.

== History ==
=== 1999-2001 ===
In the Fall of 1999 singer-songwriter Andrew Connor and drummer Richard Gintowt met while at a concert. This led to the University of Kansas students playing together at Hashinger Hall, The Bottleneck, and eventually to the creation of Ghosty. In the Fall of 2000 bassist Mark Hurst joined the band, making it a threesome, but Hurst only lasted until December. In the Spring of 2001 Connor and Gintowt were joined by Jacob Baum on the bass and won the critic's vote at the annual KJHK Farmer's Ball. Later that year Ghosty began its first tour in support of the "Five Short Minutes EP." Sondre Lerche described their debut as “U.S., nineties, guitar-based alt-rock Prefab Sprout.”

=== 2002-2005 ===
Ghosty began recording their first full-length album Grow Up or Sleep In in August 2002 at Presto! in Lincoln, Nebraska with producer Mike Mogis. After a year of school and performing they went to Bell Labs in Norman, Oklahoma to work with Trent Bell to finish the album. While in the studios they provided backing vocals, sleighbells, acoustic guitar, bass, and keyboards on the Flaming Lips' "Ego Tripping at the Gates of Hell." In return Flaming Lips lead singer Wayne Coyne lent his vocals to their album. "Grow Up or Sleep In" was released by Future Farmer Records in 2005.

=== 2006-2008 ===
Currently the Ghosty lineup consists of Andrew Connor (guitar, vocals), Mike Nolte (bass, guitar, vocals), David Wetzel (keyboard, guitar, vocals, tambourine) and Josh Adams (drumset). Ghosty completed a coast-to-coast tour of the United States at the end of 2006 and began working on a new full-length album, Answers, which was released on January 11, 2008 on OxBlood Records. After four years with the band, drummer Josh Adams left as of October 13, 2008.

=== 2009-present ===
Ghosty now releases their music under their own imprint, More Famouser Records. They released two EPs in 2009, A Mystic's Robe and O Foolish Pride, and another EP in 2010, Team Up Again, as well as a deluxe edition of Grow Up or Sleep In, all available as digital downloads on their bandcamp.com page. The band released their self-titled album, GHOSTY, via digital download and limited edition vinyl through High Dive Records.

== Discography ==
Album	Release date
Five Short Minutes	(2001)
Three Pop Songs	(2002)
Untitled	(2003)
Grow Up or Sleep In	(2005)
Me, me, me.	(2005)
No Nothing	(2006)
Answers	(2008)
A Mystic's Robe	(2009)
O Foolish Pride	(2009)
Team Up Again	(2010)
GHOSTY	(2011)

== Reviews ==
- KWCW
- Red Alert
- JamBase
- Lawrence.com
