= Designing a Nervous Breakdown =

Studio album by the Anniversary
- Released: January 25, 2000
- Recorded: July 1999
- Studios: Kingsize Soundlabs, Chicago, Illinois
- Genres: Emo; indie rock; synth-pop
- Length: 39:59
- Labels: Vagrant; Heroes & Villains
- Producer: David Trumfio

The Anniversary chronology
Designing a Nervous Breakdown (2000)	Your Majesty (2002)

Designing a Nervous Breakdown is the debut studio album by the American rock band the Anniversary, released on January 25, 2000, through Vagrant and Heroes & Villains Records. After finalizing their line-up and changing their name, the band self-released a three-track demo tape in 1998. The following year, they signed to Vagrant imprint Heroes & Villains Records at the insistence of the Get Up Kids bassist Rob Pope. In July 1999, the Anniversary recorded their debut with producer David Trumfio at Kingsize Soundlabs in Chicago, Illinois. Designing a Nervous Breakdown has been described as an emo, indie rock and synth-pop release, drawing comparison to Devo, the Rentals and Sonic Youth.

Designing a Nervous Breakdown was met with generally positive reviews from music critics. Preceded by a split-single with the Get Up Kids, the album was promoted with West and East Coast tours of the United States with Love as Laughter, Hot Rod Circuit and Piebald. They then embarked on European and US tours with the Get Up Kids and labelmates Koufax. Designing a Nervous Breakdown has appeared on various best-of emo album lists by A.Side TV, LA Weekly and Treblezine; it has since influenced acts such as the All-American Rejects and Hellogoodbye.

== Background and production ==
The Broadcast was formed in October 1997 by vocalists and guitarists Josh Berwanger and Justin Roelofs while they were in high school from the remnants of their local pop punk bands. The first song they wrote was written with a Moog synthesizer in mind. The pair had the idea of bringing in a female keyboardist, at which point Adrianne Verhoeven joined the group; Verhoeven would later also tackle lead vocals. The band held their first show that year in the basement of Berwanger's mother's house. When the members went to college, drummer Christian Jankowski and bassist James David joined the band. Upon seeing a plate that read "Happy 10th Anniversary" at Verhoeven's parents' house, they changed their name to the Anniversary. In 1998, they self-released a three-track demo tape, which had been recorded by David Trumfio at Kingsize Soundlabs in Chicago, Illinois.

The Get Up Kids bassist Rob Pope sought out the Anniversary in 1999 with the intention of releasing their debut on Heroes & Villains Records, an imprint of Vagrant Records that was owned by the Get Up Kids. Berwanger had been friends with Pope for a few years prior to the formation of either bands, while members from each act had played a benefit show in 1995 with their past bands. Pope and Verhoeven started dating around the time the Get Up Kids had signed to Vagrant, with that band giving the label the Anniversary's demo tapes. The Anniversary spent some time playing supporting slots for the likes of the Pulsars, Superchunk and Helium. For Designing a Nervous Breakdown, the band returned to Kingsize Soundlabs with Trumfio as the producer, engineer and mixer. Sessions were held in July 1999; the recordings were mastered by Ramon Breton at Oceanview Mastering.

== Composition ==
Designing a Nervous Breakdown has been described as an emo, indie rock and synth-pop release, with new wave and Blink-182-styled punk rock influences. The band drew comparisons to Devo, Sonic Youth, the Get Up Kids (specifically their album Something to Write Home About) and the Rentals. Berwanger disagreed with the Get Up Kids comparison, as he said that band only added a keyboardist to their line-up after seeing the Anniversary perform. It incorporated frequent synthesizer usage, alongside electronic drums and group vocals. Berwanger likened their sound as a cross between Guns N' Roses and New Order. He said the majority of the tracks dealt with the topic of death.

The opening track "The Heart Is a Lonely Hunter" was reminiscent of Modest Mouse and Joan of Arc, with a Moog part appearing halfway through it. The power pop track "All Things Ordinary" and "The D in Detroit" begin with similar guitar intros and subsequently chord progressions. The latter has fuzz box-esque synth sounds that appear during the chorus sections. "Perfectly" channeled the brooding nature of the Cure, while its outro was reminiscent of Explosions in the Sky. "The D in Detroit" was an archetypical Anniversary song: upbeat emo funneling the soul of pop punk, with flourishes of synth and Verhoeven's vocals. "Shu Shubat" incorporates the use of arpeggios. The closing track "Outro in No Minor" uses finger-picking.

== Release ==
In August 1999, Designing a Nervous Breakdown was announced for release early next year. Preview clips from the album was posted on the group's website later in the month. In October, the band performed at a Heroes & Villains showcase in New York City, prior to the release of a split-single with the Get Up Kids in November. Designing a Nervous Breakdown was released on January 25, 2000; the artwork features a close-up image of a face with its mouth open. David explained that he and Berwanger were purchasing Intellivision games for the latter's system when they came across a copy of Microsurgeon (1982). David remarked that it had "cool 80’s graphics" and Berwanger said it reminded him of Devo; they subsequently sent it to designer Thomas Humphrey, who turned it into the final artwork. They promoted the album with an east coast tour in January and February, followed by an east coast trek in March and another west coast tour in April with Love as Laughter, Hot Rod Circuit and Piebald. On a budget of $600, the band made a music video for "All Things Ordinary", which Jankowski directed. It was filmed at Oldfather Studios in Lawrence, Kansas, and took influence from 1980s music videos. The clip starts with a director coming into view and telling the band he'll change their look. Over the course of the video, the members' outfits changes from cavemen to pirates to animal costumes, before returning to their normal clothes. Some extras were invited from a party down the road to dance around the band for around 30 minutes.

The group then went on a six-week of Europe with the Get Up Kids in May and June, and then an eight-week US tour with them. The band went on the Heroes & Villains Fall Tour in September and October with the Get Up Kids and Koufax; alongside this, the band and Koufax played two shows without the Get Up Kids. They took a two-week break after the trek's conclusion, before touring again until Christmas. The band received some attention when Berwanger dated actress Chloë Sevigny for a brief period. Author Leslie Simon in her book Wish You Were Here: An Essential Guide to Your Favorite Music Scenes―from Punk to Indie and Everything in Between (2009) said Limp Bizkit had reportedly stole the video concept of "All Things Ordinary" for "My Way" after their frontman Fred Durst had been shown a clip of it from an employee at Total Request Live. In 2016, Vagrant celebrated their 20th anniversary by re-pressing their back-catalogue on vinyl, including Designing a Nervous Breakdown. To celebrate the album's 20th anniversary, the band played a few shows in early 2020 where they performed the album in its entirety.

== Reception ==
Professional ratings
Review scores
Source	Rating
AllMusic	4/5 stars
Kerrang!	3/5 stars
The Phantom Tollbooth	4.5/5
Pitchfork	6.8/10
Wall of Sound	81/100

Designing a Nervous Breakdown received generally positive reviews from music critics. AllMusic reviewer Heather Phares said the album "blends their skill at crafting emotional, punky-yet-melodic songs with a fondness for new-wave synths." It was a "strong debut" which "reaffirms that traditional indie rock can still sound fresh and lively." Exclaim! writer Stuart Green said the group "puts their predilection for Devo, Sonic Youth and goofy pop hooks to good use with a collection of ten interesting and downright catchy tracks". Ox-Fanzine's Joachim Hiller was "pretty impressed" with the record, adding that it combined "contemporary pop with style elements from the early eighties without looking retro." Justin W. Jones of The Phantom Tollbooth said it was an "incredible album that is so much more accessible than run of the mill emo bands." Wall of Sound writer Patrick Enright praised Verhoeven's synthesizer as being "one of the things that make this CD addictive", and "without it, Breakdown might be dismissed as just another emo-pop record."

Punk Planet reviewer Frankie Hartzell saw it as a "pop masterpiece" that topples Pinkerton (1996) by Weezer, as its lyrics "take indie-pop sensibilities to the next level". The staff at Impact Press said the "dueling (male/female) vocals are awesome, and their tempo changes are perfectly timed". Lawrence Journal-World writer Geoff Harkness said the band come across as "tight, focused and fun", enjoying how Verhoeven's "quirky chirps and riding-on-the-Metro synths" are placed "nicely with the strumming and singing" of Roelofs and Berwanger. Ink 19's Marcel Feldmar said the Modest Mouse-esque vocals "stretch and whine over a Get-Up Kids inspired explosion of straight ahead pop and electricity laden indie rock hooks." Its combination of guitars that sweep "over rock steady rhythm[s]" and "[c]ool synth squealing" was a "good mix ... done well." Pitchfork reviewer Taylor M. Clark said " every one of the 10 songs is nearly indistinguishable from the last" with the same "guitar distortion, ... harmonies, ... emo lyrics, ... [and] moog."

Designing a Nervous Breakdown has appeared on various best-of emo album lists by A.Side TV, LA Weekly and Treblezine. Similarly, "The D in Detroit" appeared on a best-of emo songs list by Stereogum and Vulture. Simon wrote that acts such as the All-American Rejects and Hellogoodbye "wouldn't be where they are today if not for the Moog-tastic emo" of Designing a Nervous Breakdown. Thomas Diaz of The World Is a Beautiful Place & I Am No Longer Afraid to Die has cited it as an important influence.

== Track listing ==
All songs written by the Anniversary.

1. "The Heart Is a Lonely Hunter" – 3:07
2. "All Things Ordinary" – 3:52
3. "Perfectly" – 3:35
4. "The D in Detroit" – 4:16
5. "Emma Discovery" – 3:14
6. "Shu Shubat" – 3:59
7. "Till We Earned a Holiday" – 4:34
8. "Without Panasos" – 4:47
9. "Hart Crane" – 2:48
10. "Outro in No Minor" – 5:47

== Personnel ==
Personnel per booklet.

The Anniversary

- James David – bass guitar
- Josh Berwanger – guitar, vocals
- Justin Roelofs – guitar, vocals
- Christian Jankowski – drums
- Adrianne Verhoeven – keyboard, vocals

Production and design

- David Trumfio – producer, engineer, mixing
- Ramon Breton – mastering
- Thomas Humphrey – design, layout
- The Anniversary – photography
