= Bell House (album) =

Studio album by Shy Boys
- Released: August 3, 2018
- Length: 22:23
- Label: Polyvinyl

Shy Boys chronology
| Shy Boys (2014) | Bell House (2018) |

Professional ratings
Aggregate scores
| Source | Rating |
|---|---|
| Metacritic | 67/100 |
Review scores
| Source | Rating |
| AllMusic | 3.5/5 stars |
| Drowned in Sound | 7/10 |
| Exclaim! | 7/10 |
| Paste | 7.4/10 |
| Pitchfork | 6.8/10 |
| Under the Radar | 3/10 |

Bell House is the second studio album by American indie-pop band Shy Boys. It was released on August 3, 2018, under Polyvinyl Record Co.

The album title was inspired by a dilapidated house bandmates Konner Ervin and Collin and Kyle Rausch shared.

== Critical reception ==
Bell House was met with "generally favorable" reviews from critics. At Metacritic, which assigns a weighted average rating out of 100 to reviews from mainstream publications, this release received an average score of 67, based on 7 reviews. Aggregator Album of the Year gave the release 65 out of 100 based on a critical consensus of 7 reviews.

== Track listing ==
Bell House track listing
| No. | Title | Length |
|---|---|---|
| 1. | "Miracle Gro" | 1:18 |
| 2. | "Take the Doggie" | 1:34 |
| 3. | "Tragic Loss" | 2:10 |
| 4. | "No Fun" | 2:29 |
| 5. | "Evil Sin" | 2:34 |
| 6. | "Basement" | 1:34 |
| 7. | "Something Sweet" | 2:02 |
| 8. | "Bell House" | 3:45 |
| 9. | "Disconnect" | 1:52 |
| 10. | "Champion" | 3:07 |

== Personnel ==
Musicians

- Ross Brown – guitar, engineer, mixer
- Konnor Ervin – bass, drums, vocals
- Colin Rausch – guitar, backing vocals
- Kyle Rausch – drums, backing vocals
- Kyle Little – guitar

Production

- Mike Nolte – engineer, mixer
- Justin Rodier – photographer
