= High Dive Records =

High Dive Records is an independent record label based in Kansas City, Missouri. It was founded in January 2013 by Jeff McCoy in order to release The ACBs album "Little Leaves" and has expanded to include acts from the greater Kansas City area as well as Lawrence, Kansas.

== Artists ==
- The ACBs
- Arc Flash
- Berwanger
- Bonzo Madrid
- Bummer
- The Burning Peppermints
- The Conquerors
- The Creepy Jingles
- Dressy Bessy
- Drugs & Attics
- Empty Moon
- The Fog
- Fourth of July
- Fullbloods
- Ghosty
- Jim Button & The Beholders
- Organized Crimes
- Paddlefish
- PINKO
- Psychic Heat
- Rev Gusto
- Rooftop Vigilantes
- Sex Snobs
- Shy Boys
- Snacky
- HXXS
- Ebony Tusks
- Dooms
- Those Far Out Arrows
- The Whiffs
- Y God Y
- Ebony Tusks
- ThighMaster
- Koney
- The Burning Peppermints
- Dooms
- Greg Wheeler & The Poly Mall Cops
- Miss Boating

== Catalog ==
- HDR-001 The ACBs - "Little Leaves"
- HDR-002 Fourth of July - "Empty Moon"
- HDR-003 Ghosty - "Ghosty"
- HDR-004 Shy Boys - "Shy Boys"
- HDR-005 Shy Boys - "45"
- HDR-006 The Fog - "Darkness USA"
- HDR-007 Empty Moon - "The Shark"
- HDR-008 Organized Crimes - "Bel Ray Flats"
- HDR-009 Organized Crimes - "Soft Angeles"
- HDR-010 The Conquerors - "You Must Be Dreaming"
- HDR-011 Rev Gusto - "Burnt Out Friends"
- HDR-012 Bummer - "Spank"
- HDR-013 Fullbloods - "Mild West"
- HDR-014 Rooftop Vigilantes - "Let It Be"
- HDR-015 Psychic Heat - "Sunshower"
- HDR-016 Berwanger - "Demonios"
- HDR-017 The Conquerors - "I Don't Know"
- HDR-018 Snacky - "Vol 1"
- HDR-019 The Conquerors - "Wyld Time"
- HDR-020 Sex Snobs - "Emotional Stuffing"
- HDR-021 Bummer/PINKO - "Split"
- HDR-022 Arc Flash - "Carbon Copy"
- HDR-023 Bonzo Madrid - "Worry"
- HDR-024 Fourth of July - "On The Plains"
- HDR-025 The Whiffs - "Take A Whiff"
- HDR-026 Compilation - "Belly Flop"
- HDR-027 Dressy Bessy - "Summer Singles Vol 1 & 2"
- HDR-028 Jim Button & The Beholders - "Time Never Lies"
- HDR-029 The Burning Peppermints - "Glittervomit"
- HDR-030 Jim Button & The Beholders - "Time Never Lies + Paradise EP"
- HDR-031 Bummer - "Holy Terror"
- HDR-032 Paddlefish - "Spill Me!"
- HDR-033 Those Far Out Arrows - "Part Time Lizards"
- HDR-034 Empty Moon - "The Empty Moon Story"
- HDR-035 Drugs & Attics - "Clean Their Room"
- HDR-036 Y god Y - "Y god Y"
- HDR-037 The Creepy Jingles - "The Creepy Jingles"
- HDR-038 Fullbloods - "Soft and Virtual Touch"
- HDR-039 Thimastr - "Between The Knees And Squeeze"
- HDR-040 Ebony Tusks - "HDF"
- HDR-041 Ebony Tusks - "Heal_Thyself"
- HDR-043 Koney - "Koney"
- HDR-044 HXXS - "How The West Was Won"
- HDR-045 The Creepy Jingles - "Take Me At My Wordplay"
- HDR-046 Dooms - "Shellshine"
- HDR-047 Greg Wheeler & The Poly Mall Cops - "Manic Fever"
- HDR-048 Compilation - "The Deep End"
- HDR-049 Greg Wheeler & The Poly Mall Cops - "Live At The Lift"
- HDR-050 Miss Boating - "Jewel In The Trash"
- HDR-051 Fullbloods - "Playing It Safe"
- HDR-052 Thimastr - "Muscle Memories"
- HDR-053 Greg Wheeler & The Poly Mall Cops - "Slimephone Surveillance"
