= Shy Boys =

American indie pop band

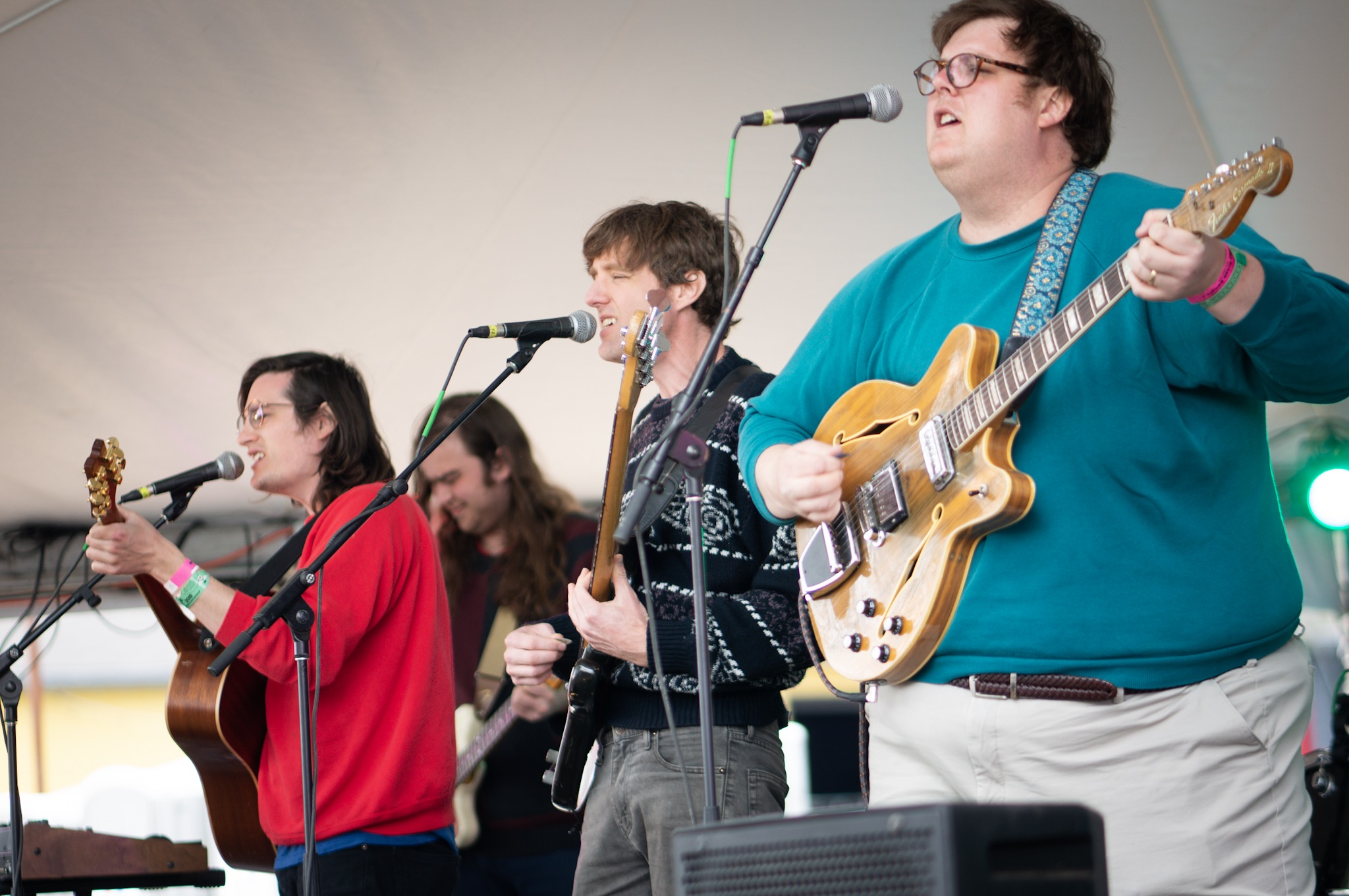

Background information
- Origin: Kansas City, Missouri, United States
- Genres: Indie rock, indie pop, psychedelic pop
- Years active: 2012–present
- Labels: High Dive Records, Polyvinyl Record Co.
- Members: Konnor Ervin; Kyle Rausch; Collin Rausch; Kyle Little; Ross Brown

Shy Boys are an American indie-pop band from Kansas City, Missouri, United States. The line-up consists of brothers Collin Rausch and Kyle Rausch, Konnor Ervin, Kyle Little, and Ross Brown.

== Band history ==
The group formed shortly after the trio became roommates in 2012. Kyle Rausch and Ervin were already bandmates in the indie-pop band The ACBs and Collin had been playing for years in the Kansas City area in various bands. The three shared a love for 1960s era pop rock and soon started writing their own music.

In 2014 they released the self-titled Shy Boys on High Dive Records. The album received generally positive reviews, and the single "Bully Fight" was featured on Spin.com. In June 2014 the band recorded and released two more singles and one of them, "Life Is Peachy," was featured on Stereogum.

On April 4, 2018, it was announced that the band had signed to Polyvinyl Record Co. and would be releasing their sophomore album, Bell House on August 3, 2018. The first single from the album, "Take the Doggie" and an accompanying lyric video were released on June 5, 2018.

== Discography ==
Shy Boys

- Released: 2014
- Format: CD/Cassette/Vinyl
- Label: High Dive Records

Bell House

- Released: 2018
- Format: CD/Cassette/Vinyl
- Label: Polyvinyl Record Co.
