= Bummer (band) =

American noise rock band

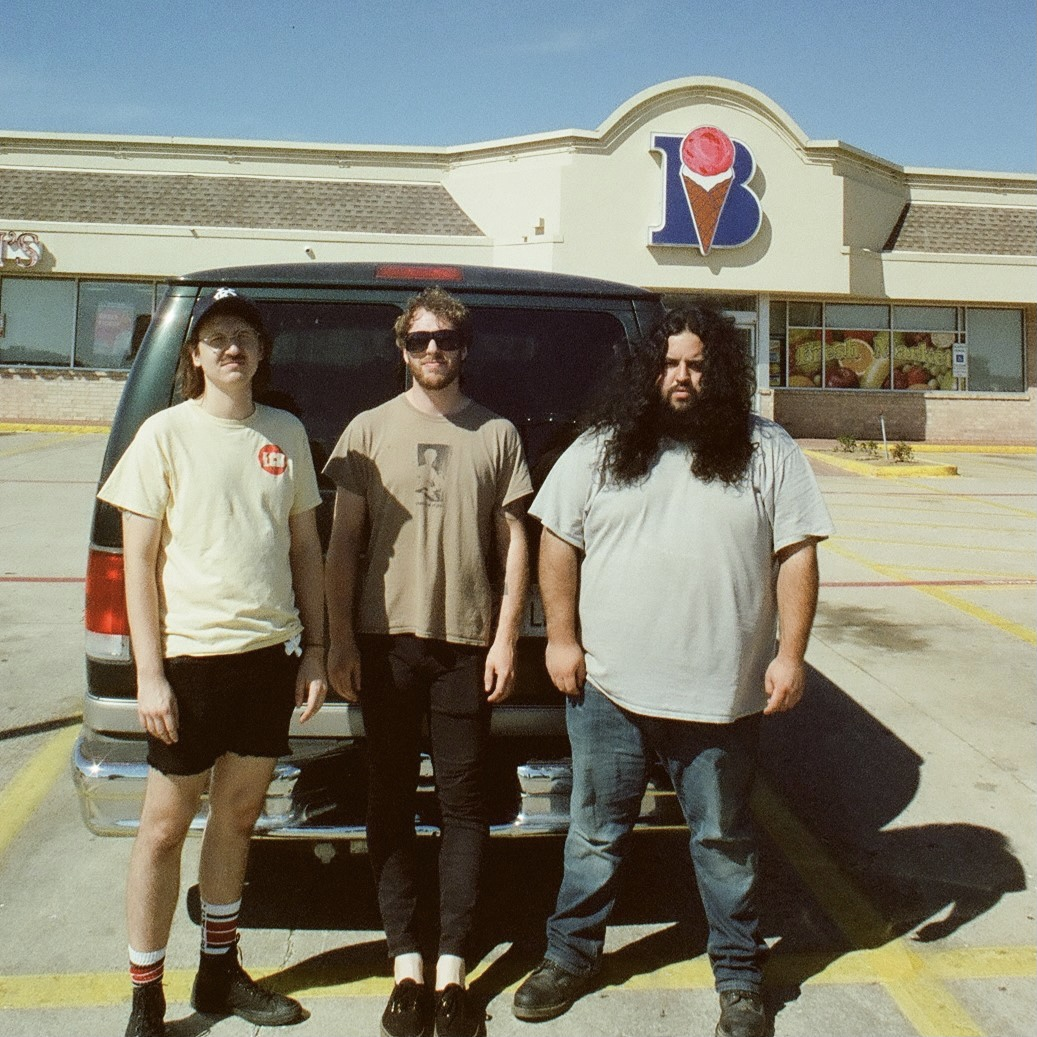
- Bummer in 2021

Background information
- Origin: Kansas City, Missouri
- Genres: Noise Rock, Sludge Metal, Hardcore Punk
- Years active: 2012-2022
- Labels: Thrill Jockey Records
- Members: Matt Perrin; Mike Gustafson; Sam Hutchinson
- Past members: Thomas Williams; Sam Hunter
- Website: bummerkc.bandcamp.com

Bummer (stylized in all caps) was an American noise rock band from Kansas City, Missouri, formed in 2012. The members included vocalist and guitarist Matt Perrin, bassist Mike Gustafson, and drummer Sam Hutchinson. The band was known for their unique sense of black humor tied into their cathartic "wall of sound" live show.

== History ==
BUMMER originally formed in July 2012 in Olathe, Kansas. The original lineup included Matt Perrin, Mike Gustafson, and Sam Hunter. Gustafson and Perrin were known to be previously jamming in other bands beforehand, and were looking for a new drummer to play with. Perrin and Hunter were seniors at Olathe East High School at the time, and Hunter took interest in playing with the two. This iteration of the lineup released the first self-released EP titled "Young Ben Franklin" in April 2013. Shortly after this release the band parted ways with drummer Sam Hunter and recruited Thomas Williams (who had played with Gustafson and Perrin previously in another band). With Williams behind the kit the band released their second self-released EP "Milk" in October 2013 as well as their infamous 2015 EP "Spank" released by High Dive Records which featured a gimp mask and BDSM themed art. Before the record was released Williams left the band to pursue a career as a master technician and Sam Hutchinson (formerly of the band CANYONS) would take over duties on drums for the foreseeable future. The band also relocated from Olathe to Kansas City at this point.

After the release of "Spank" and the touring that followed. The band released a Split 12-inch LP with PINKO from San Antonio sub-sequentially released by High Dive Records in 2017. After an extensive summer of touring with Whores. and Wrong, the band would head into the studio later that year to record their debut LP "Holy Terror" released by Learning Curve Records in 2018. Holy Terror created additional outreach and reception for the band. With people citing the bands aggressive approach of low end punch & jabbing guitars, as well as their signature sense of black humor regarding the song titles and lyrical content. The band would continue their relationship with Learning Curve Records and follow up a year later with their 2019 EP "Thanks for Nothing".

In early 2020. The band was approached by The Body & Thrill Jockey Records to do a split 7-inch after a show the two played together. This was released as "The Body / BUMMER Split 7-inch and was released by Thrill Jockey Records in Sep 2020. The band formally signed to Thrill Jockey later that year and would go on to release their second LP "Dead Horse" in 2021. "Dead Horse" was seen to push the bands sound even further. Creating a lean and consolidated sonic attack, adding sampling and additional layering. The release saw no lack in sense of humor with songs like "I Want To Punch Bruce Springsteen in the D*ck" and "Magic Cruel Bus".

The band called it quits in 2022 after playing a final show with Cherubs and Young Widows.

== Musical style ==
The band is mainly described as noise rock with heavy influences of sludge metal. The band is routinely described as creating "A Wall of Sound" for listeners, and embracing jabs of nihilistic humor within the song titles and themes of each release. Many have noted influences from Unsane, METZ, Coalesce, Helmet, Karp, Cavity, and more.

The band works a lot with of Justin Mantooth at Westend Recording Studios in Kansas City, Kansas. The band has worked with Mantooth on every release but two.

== Band members ==
=== Current members ===
- Matt Perrin - Guitar / Vocals (2012-2022)
- Mike Gustafson - Bass (2012-2022)
- Sam Hutchinson - Drums (2015-2022)

=== Former members ===
- Thomas Williams - Drums (2013-2015)
- Sam Hunter - Drums (2012-2013)

== Discography ==
=== LPs ===
- Dead Horse (2021)
- Holy Terror (2018)

=== EPs ===
- Thanks For Nothing (2019)
- Spank (2015)
- Milk (2013)
- Young Ben Franklin (2013)

=== Splits ===
- 7-inch split w/ The Body (2020)
- 12-inch split w/ PINKO (2017)
