= Fourth of July (band) =

American indie rock band

Fourth Of July
- Origin: Lawrence, Kansas, USA
- Genres: Indie rock
- Years active: 2001–2013
- Labels: Range Life Records, High Dive Records
- Members: Brendan Hangauer; Patrick Hangauer; Kelly Hangauer; Brian Costello; Brendan Costello
- Past members: Adrianne Verhoeven; Steve "Saymyname" Swyers
- Website: myspace.com/fourthofjuly3000

Fourth Of July was an indie rock band from Lawrence, Kansas. Frontman Brendan Hangauer began writing eventual Fourth of July songs as early as 1999—initially with a solo project in mind—but the band came together and began performing live in 2002. They are currently with Range Life Records. The band consists of Brendan Hangauer (vocals, guitar), Patrick Hangauer (bass), Kelly Hangauer (keys, trumpet, vocals), Brian Costello (drums), Brendan Costello (guitar). Some of their early marketing push came through posting their videos on YouTube.

== Discography ==
- Fourth of July on the Plains (2007 · Range Life)
- Before Our Hearts Explode! (2010 · Range Life)
- Empty Moon (2013 · High Dive)
