= Bummers =

Foragers during Maj. Gen. William Tecumseh Sherman's 1864 March to the Sea

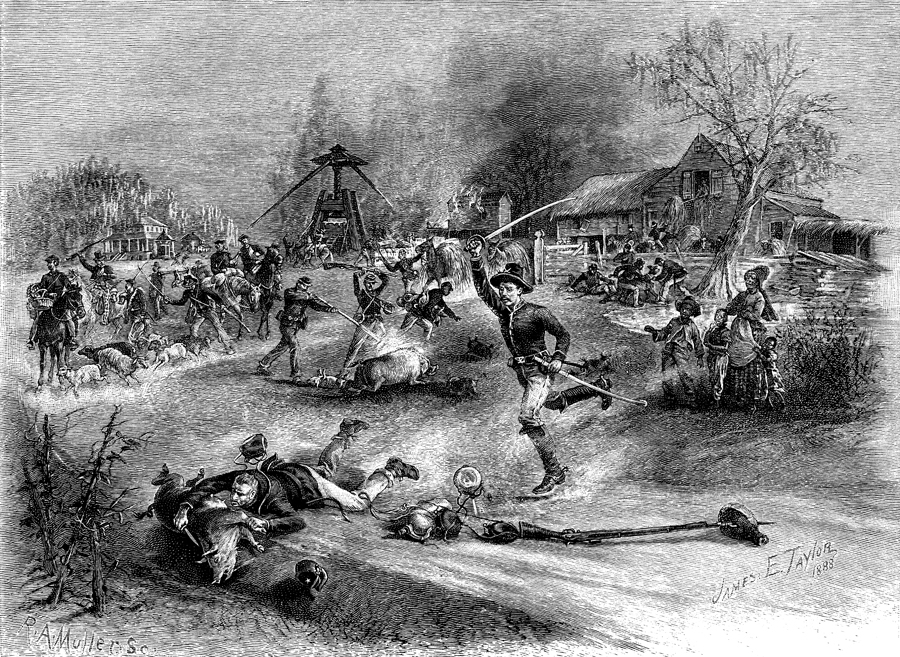
Sherman’s troops foraging on a Georgia plantation

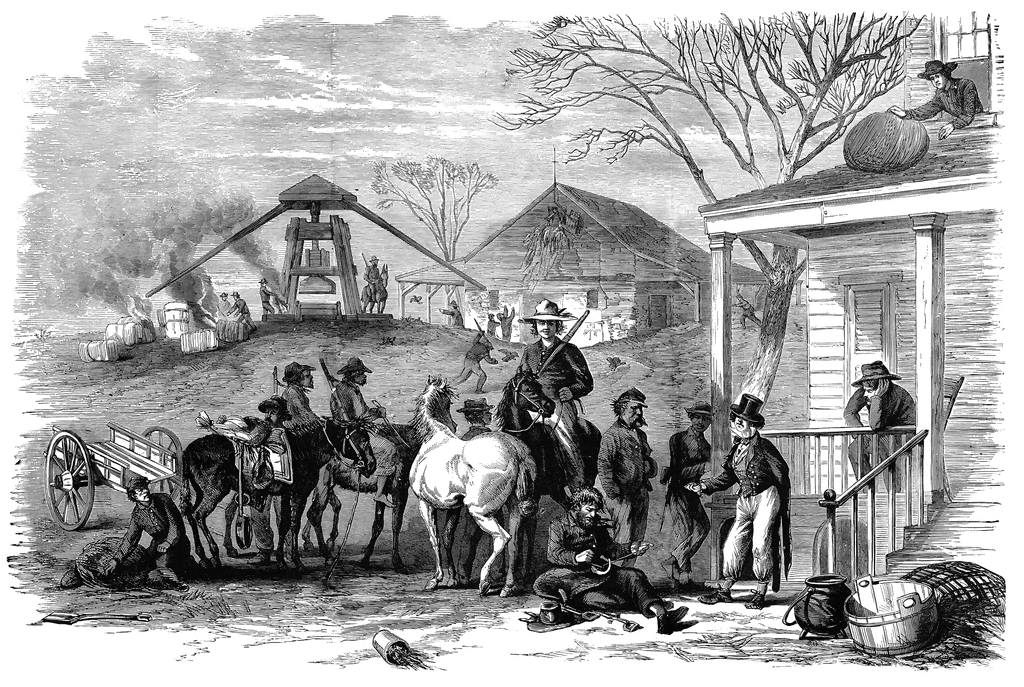
Sherman's bummers foraging in South Carolina

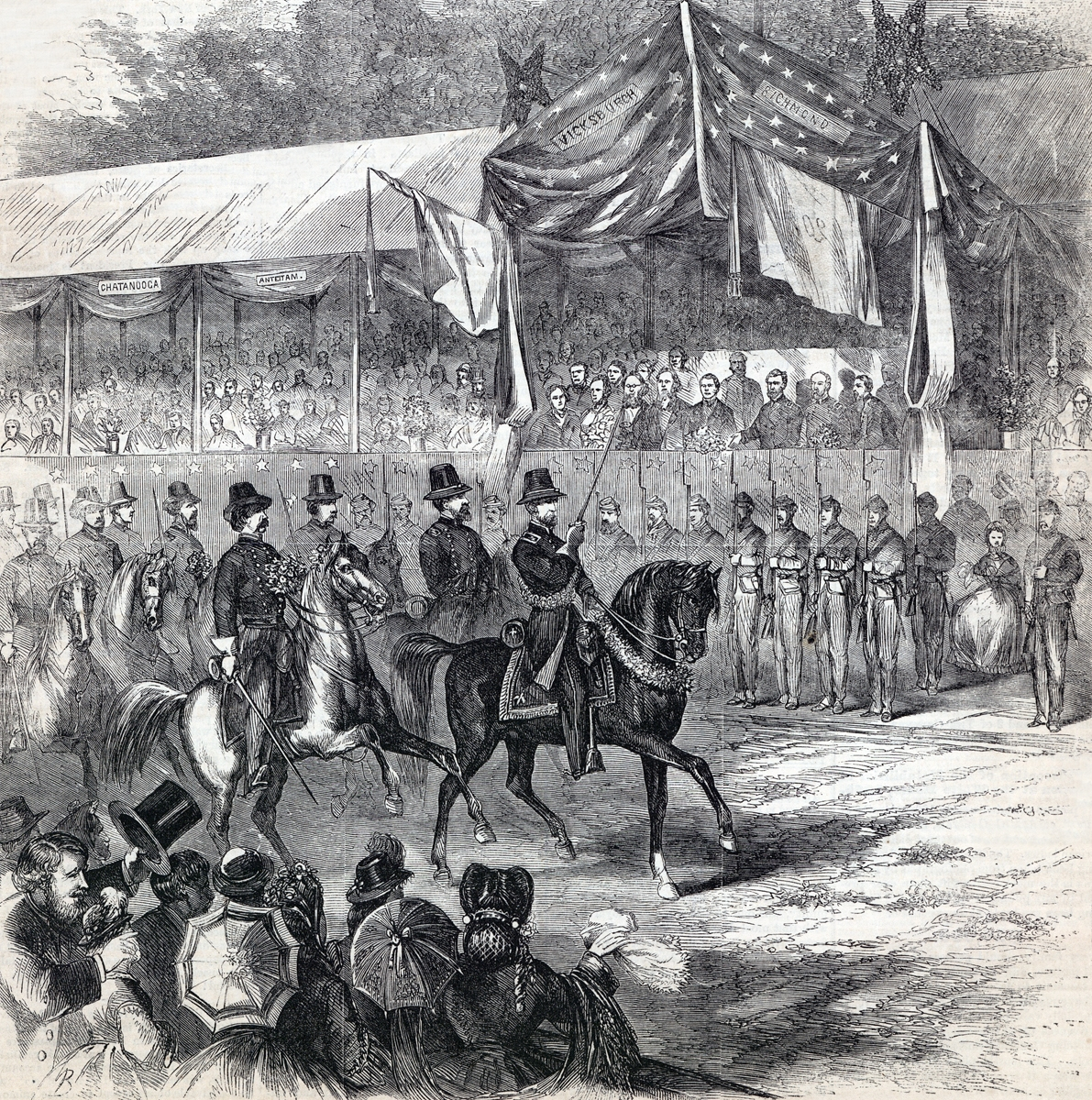
General W. T. Sherman leading his army at the Grand Review, Washington D.C., May 24, 1865

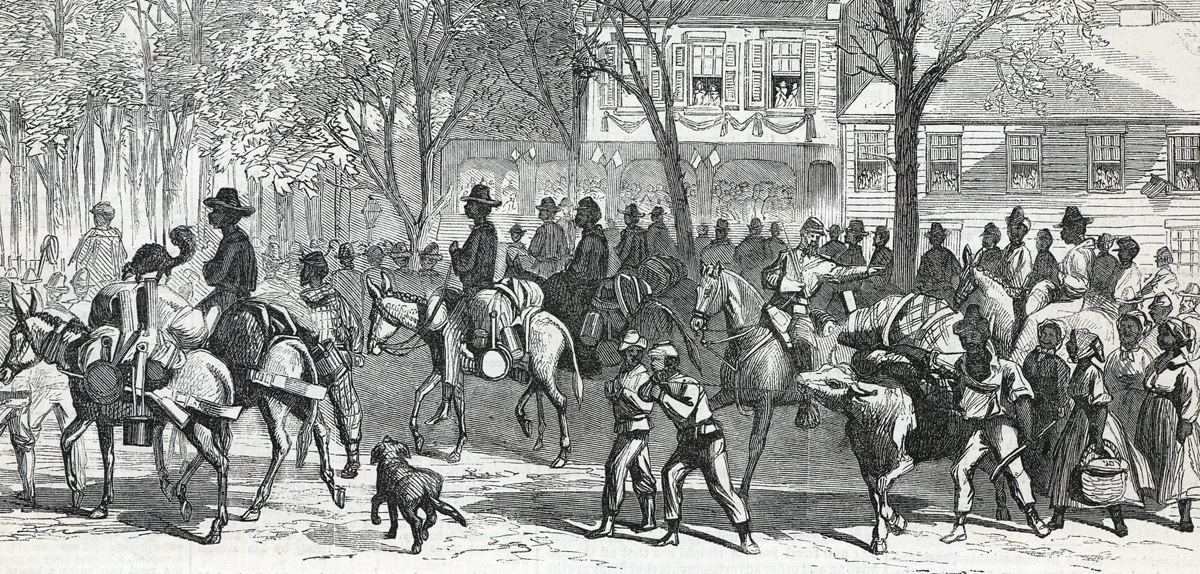
The "bummers" and foragers of Sherman's Army in the Grand Review, Washington D.C., May 24, 1865

Bummers was a nickname applied to foragers of Maj. Gen. William Tecumseh Sherman's Union army during its March to the Sea and north through South Carolina and North Carolina during the American Civil War.

== History ==
=== Origin ===
The designation "bummers" was used, both by soldiers and civilians, to describe Sherman's soldiers, official and unofficial, who "requisitioned" food from Southern homes along the route of the Army's march. Often highly destructive in nature, bummers became notorious among Southerners for looting and vandalism, and they did much to shatter the illusion that the Confederate Army was successfully defending its territory on all fronts. The bummers' activities in Georgia and the Carolinas helped ensure that the South would be unable to sustain its war effort; additionally, bummers' destruction of industrial property rendered the garrisoning of southern cities largely unnecessary by destroying most, if not all, of those facilities in their path that replenished the Confederate war effort (such as cotton gins, farms, foundries, lumber mills, etc.).

One southern family's encounter with bummers was recorded by North Carolina resident and Civil War diarist Jane Evans Elliot:

This day two weeks since, 12 of March was a day of sorrow and confusion never to be forgotten. Sherman’s army reached Fayetteville the day before, and at 9 o’clock Sunday morning, a party of raiders rushed in upon our peaceful home. They pillaged and plundered the whole day and quartered upon that night and staid [sic] until 5 o’clock Monday evening. Some part of the time there were at least three different parties. The house was rifled from garret to cellar. Took all our blankets and all [my husband’s] clothes, all our silver and knives and forks, all our luxuries, leaving nothing but a little meat and corn. They threatened [my husband’s] life repeatedly and one ruffian galloped up to the door and pulled out his matches to fire the house. Oh! it was terrible beyond description. It seems ever present to my mind. One night they strung fire all around us and we took up the children and dressed them and watched all night fearing the fire might consume our dwelling.

— Jane Evans Elliot, March 25, 1865.

Sherman admitted himself after the war that "many acts of pillage, robbery, and violence were committed" by the bummers.

=== Interpretation ===
Sherman’s veterans appropriated the belittling title bummer as a point of personal pride. On May 24, 1865, Sherman’s Army paraded for six hours through the Pennsylvania Avenue in Washington, D.C., during the Grand Review of the Union Armies on May 23–24, 1865. Union General Horace Porter called foraging during the Sherman's raid a "novel feature of Sherman's command . . . organized for a very useful purpose from the adventurous spirits which are always found in the ranks." Another Union General Henry Warner Slocum characterized the Sherman's March as "one great picnic from beginning to end” with "just enough fighting and danger of fighting to give zest to the experience." Union General Edward Follansbee Noyes said that in "this rollicking picnic expedition there was just enough of fighting for variety, enough of hardship to give zest to the repose which followed it, and enough of ludicrous adventure to make its memory a constant source of gratification."

The Southern portrayal of Sherman's bummers was quite the opposite and was epitomized by Margaret Mitchell in her novel Gone with the Wind.

A United States military education resource states:

During Sherman's March to the Sea in the Civil War, General Sherman and his subordinates earned a reputation for destruction and for the lack of discipline of his troops. His marauding stragglers became known as "Sherman's bummers."

== In popular culture ==
In American cartoonist John L. Magee's 1865 cartoon Jeff Davis Caught at Last: Hoop Skirts and Southern Chivalry, a Union soldier threatens the disguised Jefferson Davis, "[Drop] that bucket and hood or I'll drop you quicker than a Duch lunch [sic] can slide down a Bummer's windpipe."
