= David Wetzel =

American historian

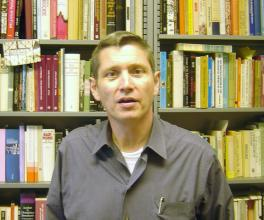
- Education: University of Pennsylvania; University of Chicago
- Occupation: Historian

David Wetzel is an American international historian who teaches at the University of California, Berkeley, specializing in the diplomacy of nineteenth and twentieth century Europe. He has written on the Crimean War and on the three wars of German Unification. The focus of his scholarly concern is the political history of Europe, and especially Germany, since 1800.

== Education ==
David Wetzel earned a bachelor's degree from the University of Pennsylvania and a doctorate in history from the University of Chicago with a dissertation on the Crimean War.

== Career ==
=== Teaching ===
Wetzel started working at Berkeley in 1986 in the billing and payments services department, and was hired as a lecturer in 2003 after completing A Duel of Giants. In 2012 he was one of seven Berkeley faculty members listed among America's best professors in a book published by The Princeton Review.

== Selected bibliography ==
=== Books ===
(With William Carr) A History of Germany, 1800 to the Present, 5th Edition ( Bloomsbury: London and New York, 2023)

A Duel of Nations: Germany, France, and the Diplomacy of the War of 1870–1871 (Madison, Wisconsin: University of Wisconsin Press, 2012)

Duell der Giganten: Bismarck, Napoleon III. und die Ursachen des Deutsch-Französischen Krieges 1870–71 (Paderborn, Germany: FerdinandSchöningh Verlag, 2005)

Translation of:

A Duel of Giants: Bismarck, Napoleon III and the Origins of the Franco-Prussian War (Madison, Wisconsin: University of Wisconsin Press, 2001). Paperback, 2003

The Crimean War: A Diplomatic History (Boulder, CO: East European Monographs, 1985)

=== Edited books ===
Systems, Stability, and Statecraft: Essays on the International History of Modern Europe / Paul W. Schroeder; edited and with an introduction by David Wetzel, Robert Jervis and Jack S. Levy (New York: Palgrave, 2004)

International Politics and German History: The Past Informs the Present / edited by David Wetzel and Theodore S. Hamerow (Westport, Conn.: Praeger, 1997)

From the Berlin Museum to the Berlin Wall: Essays on the Cultural and Political History of Modern Germany / edited by David Wetzel (Westport, Conn.: Praeger, 1996)

=== Online bibliography ===
The Wars of German Unification” in: Oxford Bibliographies (an online cooperative research guide). Section: Military History. (Editor-in-chief: Dennis Showalter); URL: http://www.oxfordbibliographies.com/view/document/obo-9780199791279/obo-9780199791279-0064.xml

== Media ==
- C-Span Book Discussion on A Duel of Giants
- Appearance on the Book Edwards Show
