= White Flight (band) =

- Also known as: Justin Roelofs
- Origin: Lawrence, Kansas, U.S.
- Genres: Indie rock, alternative rock, experimental pop
- Labels: Range Life Records; Saddle Creek Records

White Flight is the solo project of Justin Roelofs, longtime musician and former singer/guitarist for The Anniversary. Roelofs released an experimental self-titled debut album in 2006, followed by a re-release in 2007.

== Background ==
Justin Roelofs and his friend Zach Hangauer founded Range Life Records in August 2004. Roelofs consciously abstained from writing music for six months, before going on a trip to Peru. After returning, he wrote and recorded an album "in neighbors' basements and borrowed apartments" throughout 2005. Most of the instruments on the album were played by Roelofs. The album, titled White Flight, was released on Range Life the next year. NPR described the album as "largely experimental with off-balanced poly-rhythms, electronics and strangely affected vocals" and "complementing freak folk and psychedelic rock with hip-hop beats and soul and jazz harmonies".

The album was originally released for download only on Range Life's website, complete with album art and a "Making of White Flight" video from the label Range Life Records. Range Life Records became distributed by Saddle Creek Records in February 2007, making "White Flight" widely available through online retailers and the iTunes Store.

On February 26, 2007, Pitchfork Media gave the album a 5.5 out of 10, saying that the album lacked substance, suffers from "hippie poetry", and was "woefully disjointed".

The album White Ark, recorded in August 2007, was leaked online but never officially released. Two singles from the album, "Panther" and "Children of the Light", were released digitally in 2010 on Range Life. They also received physical releases in the United Kingdom via Make Mine.

Roelofs formed the electronic duo Abuela with E*vax (of Ratatat), their debut release being "True Colors" in 2014.

Following that, he teamed with the other member of Ratatat, Mike Stroud, to from another group called Kunzite, which has since released two albums.

== Discography ==
- White Flight (2007 – Range Life)
- White Ark (unreleased)
- "Panther" (2010 – Range Life)
- "Children of the Light" (2010 – Range Life)
- "Panther"/"Children of the Light" 7" (2010 – Make Mine)
