= Range Life Records =

- Founded: 2005
- Country of origin: United States
- Location: San Francisco

Range Life Records is an independent record label originally based in Lawrence, Kansas, but now based in San Francisco. It was founded in 2005 by Zach Hangauer. The label name was inspired by the Pavement song "Range Life". The design director of the label is Jeffrey Isom of Pre Sense Form.

== Artists ==
- White Flight
- 1,000,000 Light Years
- Fourth of July
- Dri
- Suzannah Johannes
- Say My Name
- Coke Weed X
- HANZ BRONZE

== Catalog ==
- RLR-01 White Flight - White Flight CD/Digital
- RLR-02 1,000,000 Light Years - 1,000,000 Light Years EP CD/Digital
- RLR-03 Fourth of July - Fourth of July on the Plains CD/Digital
- RLR-04 Dri - Smoke Rings CD/Digital
- RLR-05 Suzannah Johannes - Suzannah Johannes 7-inch EP/Digital
- RLR-06 White Flight - Panther (Single) Digital
- RLR-07 Say My Name - Say My Name 12-inch EP/Digital
- RLR-08 Fourth Of July - Before Our Hearts Explode! 12-inch LP/Digital
- RLR-09 White Flight - Children of Light (Single) Digital
- RLR-10 Say My Name - Say My Name 2 Digital
- RLR-11 Coke Weed X - "Coke Weed X" Digital
- RLR-12 1,000,000 Light Years - "Your Spaceship Awaits You, My Love EP" Digital
- RLR-13 Fourth of July - "Empty Moon" Digital (Digital Distribution only - official release on High Dive Records)
- RLR-14 Say My Name - "Malaise Forever" Digital (Digital Distribution only - official release on Foreign Domestic)
- RLR-15 Empty Moon - "The Shark" Digital (Digital Distribution only - official release on High Dive Records)
- RLR-16 HANZ BRONZE - "Hanz Bronze" Cassette/Digital

== See also ==
- Saddle Creek
- List of record labels
