= The Umbrella Academy season 4 =

The Umbrella Academy
- Season 4
- Promotional poster
- Starring: Elliot Page; Tom Hopper; David Castañeda; Emmy Raver-Lampman; Robert Sheehan; Aidan Gallagher; Justin H. Min; Ritu Arya; Colm Feore
- No. of episodes: 6

Release
- Original network: Netflix
- Original release: August 8, 2024

Season chronology
- ← Previous; Season 3

The fourth and final season of the superhero comedy drama television series The Umbrella Academy was released on Netflix on August 8, 2024, and consisted of six episodes. Created for television by Steve Blackman and developed Jeremy Slater, the series is an adaptation of the comic book series of the same name written by Gerard Way and illustrated by Gabriel Bá, both of whom serve as executive producers on the series. The season focuses on the Umbrella siblings tracking down a girl named Jennifer, while a group known as The Keepers try to activate the "Cleanse", which will end the world to reset the timeline.

The fourth season features Elliot Page, Tom Hopper, David Castañeda, Emmy Raver-Lampman, Robert Sheehan, Aidan Gallagher, Justin H. Min, Ritu Arya, and Colm Feore as part of the main cast, while David Cross, Nick Offerman, Megan Mullally, Martin Roach, Zack Binder, Victoria Sawal, Liisa Repo-Martell, Millie Davis, George Tchortov and Jessica Greco appear in recurring roles. The fourth season received mixed reviews, with criticism being directed towards the writing, character development, pacing, reduced length, and the conclusion, though the performances and action sequences were praised. Many ultimately deemed the season an unsatisfying conclusion to the show.

== Cast and characters ==
=== Main ===
- Elliot Page as Viktor Hargreeves / Number Seven
- Tom Hopper as Luther Hargreeves / Number One / Spaceboy
- David Castañeda as Diego Hargreeves / Number Two
- Emmy Raver-Lampman as Allison Hargreeves / Number Three
- Robert Sheehan as Klaus Hargreeves / Number Four
  - Dante Albidone as young Klaus
- Aidan Gallagher as Number Five
  - Sean Sullivan as an elderly version of Five
- Justin H. Min as Ben Hargreeves / Sparrow Number Two
- Ritu Arya as Lila Pitts
- Colm Feore as Sir Reginald Hargreeves

=== Recurring ===
- David Cross as Sy Grossman
- Nick Offerman as Dr. Gene Thibedeau
- Megan Mullally as Dr. Jean Thibedeau
- Martin Roach as Lance Ribbons
- Zack Binder as Derek
- Victoria Sawal as Jennifer / Rosie
- Liisa Repo-Martell as Abigail Hargreeves
- Millie Davis as Claire
- George Tchortov as Quinn
- Jessica Greco as Bea

=== Guest ===
- Cameron Britton as Hazel
- Adam Godley as Pogo
- Kate Walsh as The Handler
- Sheila McCarthy as Agnes Rofa
- Jordan Claire Robbins as Grace Hargreeves / Mom
- Kris Holden-Ried as Axel
- Jason Bryden as Otto
- Tom Sinclair as Oscar
- Patrice Goodman as Dot
- Ken Hall as Herb
- Mckenna Bridger as Holly

== Episodes ==
No. overall	No. in season	Title	Directed by	Written by	Original release date
31	1	"The Unbearable Tragedy of Getting What You Want"	Jeremy Webb	Steve Blackman & Jesse McKeown	August 8, 2024
Six years after resetting the universe, the Umbrella siblings are living normal lives without their powers or the Academy's existence. Ben has recently been released from prison for a crypto scam, Luther is now a stripper, Allison is acting in commercials, Klaus is a sober but overly cautious germaphobe, and Viktor is running his own bar, far from everyone else. Diego is an out-of-shape delivery driver married to Lila, with kids, but believes he could join the CIA. Five is an actual member of the CIA, going undercover to learn about a group of people known as Keepers, who remember previous timelines and collect evidence of those timelines existing, led by Jean and Gene Thibedeau. While en-route to Diego and Lila's daughter's birthday party, Viktor gets kidnapped by a man named Sy Grossman, whose daughter, Jennifer, is missing after joining the Keepers. Five agrees to help after finding marigold in Sy's box. Despite knowing the marigold will give their powers back, the siblings vote not to consume it. Ben steals the marigold, and has the Umbrella siblings drink a round of saké together. Once everyone has left, Ben adds marigold to his saké and drinks it.
32	2	"Jean and Gene"	Jeremy Webb	Teleplay by : Molly Nussbaum & Robert Askins; Story by : Molly Nussbaum & Robert Askins and Jesse McKeown	August 8, 2024
The next day, feeling sick and hungover, the Umbrella siblings find themselves having access to their powers again, with Lila now being able to shoot laser beams from her eyes. Ben reveals that he spiked the group's saké with marigold, thus giving them all powers, except Klaus, who discarded his saké. The group heads back to Sy, but find him gone, leaving only a map leading to a small town in Maine. The group drives to Maine to find Jennifer. On the way, Diego tells Five he thinks Lila is cheating on him. Five, knowing Lila was with him at a Keepers meeting, dissuades him from his suspicions. While in Maine, the townspeople, later revealed to be Hargreeves' employees, try to kill the Umbrella siblings. Ben finds Jennifer and persuades her to join them. Klaus is mortally wounded, but is revived after being given marigold. As Ben promises to reunite Jennifer with her dad, she is confused. Before she can respond, their car is attacked by Jean and Gene, who kidnap Jennifer.
33	3	"The Squid and The Girl"	Paco Cabezas	Aeryn Michelle Williams and Elizabeth Padden	August 8, 2024
In January 1995, a giant squid was caught with Jennifer inside. When asked what happened, Jennifer responded with "The Cleanse". Shortly after, Reginald built a town in Maine for Jennifer to live a normal life, yet stay protected. In the present day, Ben’s body has changed after colliding with Jennifer during the kidnapping. Klaus gets kidnapped by his drug dealer, Quinn, after he discovers Klaus’ immortality. Five, Diego and Lila go to the Keepers' HQ. Five reveals to Lila that his powers now allow him to navigate between timelines via subway station, to the same time and place. Allison, Viktor, and Luther go to Hargreeves' manor, where they meet Abigail and Reginald. Five, Diego and Lila find files from the original timeline, which list Ben's cause of death as "The Jennifer Incident". Realizing the original Reginald erased their memories of how Ben died, they attempt to restore their memory. Meanwhile, Jean and Gene show Jennifer mementos of the original timeline, as well as the giant squid. While Ben is searching for Jennifer, Sy tells Ben to listen to his body. Ben rescues Jennifer from the Thibedeaus, unaware they intentionally let them escape.
34	4	"The Cleanse"	Paco Cabezas	Lauren Otero and Thomas Page McBee	August 8, 2024
On October 14, 2006, in the original timeline, the Umbrella Academy (minus Five and Vanya) are sent to destroy a container in Moldova. Ben hears Jennifer inside, and lets her out. Reginald arrives and kills both Ben and Jennifer in front of the others. After regaining their memories of the incident, Abigail reveals that she was responsible for Reginald killing them. Years ago, she created a new element, marigold. However, a second element was unknowingly created, durango, which is currently inside Jennifer. If the two interact, it would cause “The Cleanse”, which would destroy the world. To prevent this, Reginald wants to kill Ben, but Viktor instead wants to remove Ben’s marigold. Five and Lila try to find the original timeline to prevent the original Ben’s death, but get lost. Meanwhile, Klaus is forced to become a medium and prostitute for Quinn in order to pay off his debts. Klaus manages to escape Quinn’s building and finds a bag of money in a grave. Quinn finds Klaus, steals the money and starts burying him. Elsewhere, Ben and Jennifer have sex in a motel, releasing an energy surge that damages their surroundings and kills the motel’s clerk.
35	5	"Six Years, Five Months, and Two Days"	Neville Kidd	Teleplay by : Jesse McKeown and Andrew Raab; Story by : Robert Askins & Christopher High and Jesse McKeown & Andrew Raab	August 8, 2024
Five and Lila get lost for over six years while traveling through the timeline subway system. Viktor and Reginald contact Ben and try to warn him about interacting with Jennifer, but he ignores their warnings. However, Jennifer starts feeling sick. Sy informs the Keepers about Ben’s role with Jennifer, and recommends keeping Ben’s siblings away from him. The Keepers set a trap that kills Reginald’s men and injures Viktor. At the CIA headquarters, Luther realizes Five’s boss, Ribbons, is a member of the Keepers, leading to Luther and Diego fighting their way out of the CIA. Gene distrusts Sy, and tells him to leave. Sy, revealed to be Abigail in disguise, kills Gene and disguises herself as him, just as the Keepers are informed of Ben and Jennifer’s current whereabouts. Five and Lila decide to take a break from traveling and stay in one of the timelines, and fall in love with each other. While scavenging, Five finds notes written by himself, which will lead them back to their home timeline, but hides them from Lila for a few months. Five is hesitant to return, but Lila wants to go back immediately. Meanwhile, Allison and Claire find and rescue Klaus from the grave.
36	6	"End of the Beginning"	Paco Cabezas	Teleplay by : Jesse McKeown and Robert Askins & Christopher High and Steve Blackman; Story by : Jesse McKeown	August 8, 2024
The Keepers set a blockade around Ben and Jennifer’s building, where their bodies have been severely mutated as a result of them interacting with each other. Viktor tries purging the durango now inside Ben, but fails. Ben and Jennifer merge to become the Cleanse. Abigail tells Reginald she brought about the Cleanse because she shouldn’t have been brought back to life, thus resetting the timeline again. Five, dejected at failing to stop the Cleanse, rides the timeline subway alone, until he meets Fives from other timelines. They tell him that there is only supposed to be one timeline, and the splitting and merging of timelines, as well as the constant threat of apocalypses, is due to the existence of the marigold and their families. When Reginald first released the marigold in 1989, a side effect of women getting pregnant was also the creation of multiple timelines. Five goes back to his siblings, and tells them they need to let the Cleanse absorb them and their marigold. In doing so, they will cease to exist, but will also create only one singular timeline without any apocalypses. Lila saves her family and Claire, then joins the siblings as they all get absorbed, destroying all but one timeline. In a mid-credits scene, a cluster of actual marigold flowers blossom at the base of the giant sycamore tree. As they do, they generate pollen that's reminiscent of the same substance that the Marigold elixir would generate, in all of the timelines in which the Umbrella students would've still existed.

== Production ==
=== Development ===
In June 2022, showrunner Steve Blackman revealed that, should the series get renewed for a fourth season, it would most likely serve as the end to the series, although he did not rule out the possibility of Netflix pursuing further installments. In August 2022, Netflix renewed the series for a fourth and final season, with Jesse McKeown serving as co-showrunner with Blackman. The season consisted of only six episodes, the fewest of any season.

=== Writing ===
Showrunners Steve Blackman and Jesse McKeown wrote the first episode, while co-executive producers Molly Nussbaum and Robert Askins wrote the second. Supervising producer Aeryn Michelle Williams and producer Elizabeth Padden wrote the third episode, and the fourth episode was written by producer Lauren Otero and co-producer Thomas Page McBee. Andrew Raab co-wrote the fifth episode with McKeown, and Askins and Christopher High co-wrote the sixth episode with McKeown and Blackman

=== Casting ===
In February 2023, Megan Mullally, Nick Offerman, and David Cross joined the cast for the fourth season in undisclosed capacities.

=== Filming ===
Filming for the fourth season was postponed due to the COVID-19 pandemic, and began on February 2, 2023, and concluded on May 31, 2023. Filming for the season was finished before the 2023 Writers Guild of America strike occurred.

The closing shot of "End of the Beginning" features the song "I Think We're Alone Now" by Tommy James and the Shondells. A cover of the song previously featured in the final moments of "We Only See Each Other at Weddings and Funerals".

== Reception ==
The fourth season holds an approval rating of 56% on Rotten Tomatoes, based on 34 reviews, with an average rating of 5.8/10. The website's critics consensus states, "Getting the band back together for one last haphazard race to the finish, The Umbrella Academy's fourth season rains on the series' parade a bit while still offering some sweet grace notes". On Metacritic, the fourth season received a score of 59 based on reviews from 11 critics, signifying "mixed or average" reviews.

Chase Hutchinson of IGN gave the season a "good" 7 out of 10, saying "Season 4 isn’t perfect, and it often feels constrained and narrow thanks to its shortened length. Still, it does right by its ragtag group of superheroes." Hutchinson commented on the smaller episode count, saying it "has its pros and cons", stating that "Season 4 is rushed. Surprise reveals, reversals of fate, and the looming threat of annihilation are fundamental to the Umbrella Academy experience, but all that is slightly constrained here" while also praising it for not having "filler episodes, and extraneous subplots that played like shallow video-game side quests", a problem he says previous seasons had. Hutchinson praised Elliot Page's acting, saying "Page continues to be a performer capable of doing even more heavy lifting than his super-strong counterparts."
