= The Umbrella Academy season 3 =

The Umbrella Academy
- Season 3
- Promotional poster
- Starring: Elliot Page (Note: Initially credited as Ellen Page in the first and second seasons, Netflix updated the onscreen credits from Ellen to Elliot for those seasons within a week (by 8 December 2020) of Page announcing his name change. Also changed were Page's credits in other works in Netflix's exclusive library of streaming products, including the films Tallulah (2016) and Flatliners (2017), and the miniseries Tales of the City (2019).); Tom Hopper; David Castañeda; Emmy Raver-Lampman; Robert Sheehan; Aidan Gallagher; Justin H. Min; Ritu Arya; Genesis Rodriguez; Britne Oldford; Colm Feore
- No. of episodes: 10

Release
- Original network: Netflix
- Original release: June 22, 2022

Season chronology
- ← Previous; Season 2 Next → Season 4

The third season of the superhero comedy drama television series The Umbrella Academy was released on Netflix on June 22, 2022, and consisted of 10 episodes. Created for television by Steve Blackman and developed Jeremy Slater, the series is an adaptation of the comic book series of the same name written by Gerard Way and illustrated by Gabriel Bá, both of whom serve as executive producers on the series. The season adapts Way's outline for the then-unfinished fourth story arc of the comics, Plan B, and revolves around the Hargreeves siblings returning to 2019 after preventing the apocalypse and finding themselves in a new timeline where their father, Reginald Hargreeves, adopted seven different children.

The third season features Elliot Page, Tom Hopper, David Castañeda, Emmy Raver-Lampman, Robert Sheehan, Aidan Gallagher, Justin H. Min, Ritu Arya, Genesis Rodriguez, Britne Oldford, and Colm Feore as part of the main cast, while Jordan Claire Robbins, Callum Keith Rennie, Justin Cornwell, Jake Epstein, Cazzie David, and Javon Walton appear in recurring roles. The third season received generally positive reviews for its humor, character drama and action sequences, but was criticized by some for its pacing and story.

== Cast and characters ==
=== Main ===
- Elliot Page as Viktor Hargreeves (Vanya Hargreeves) / Number Seven
- Tom Hopper as Luther Hargreeves / Number One
- David Castañeda as Diego Hargreeves / Number Two
- Emmy Raver-Lampman as Allison Hargreeves / Number Three
- Robert Sheehan as Klaus Hargreeves / Number Four
  - Dante Albidone as young Klaus
- Aidan Gallagher as Number Five
  - Sean Sullivan as elderly Five
- Justin H. Min as Ben Hargreeves / Sparrow Number Two
- Ritu Arya as Lila Pitts
- Genesis Rodriguez as Sloane Hargreeves / Sparrow Number Five
- Britne Oldford as Fei Hargreeves / Sparrow Number Three
- Colm Feore as Sir Reginald Hargreeves

=== Recurring ===
- Jordan Claire Robbins as Grace
- Callum Keith Rennie as Harlan Cooper / Lester Pocket
  - Justin Paul Kelly as a young Harlan
- Yusuf Gatewood as Raymond "Ray" Chestnut
- Justin Cornwell as Marcus Hargreeves / Sparrow Number One
- Jake Epstein as Alphonso Hargreeves / Sparrow Number Four
- Cazzie David as Jayme Hargreeves / Sparrow Number Six
- Javon Walton as Stanley "Stan"
- Julian Richings as Chet Rodo

=== Guest ===
- Marin Ireland as Sissy Cooper
- Kate Walsh as The Handler (voice cameo)
- Adam Godley as Pogo

== Episodes ==
No. overall	No. in season	Title	Directed by	Teleplay by	Original release date
21	1	"Meet the Family"	Jeremy Webb	Steve Blackman & Michelle Lovretta	June 22, 2022
The Umbrella siblings find themselves in an altered timeline. After their encounter with Reginald in 1963, he changed the timeline by adopting Ben along with six other children, whom he trained into a superhero team dubbed "The Sparrow Academy." The two sets of siblings fight, and the Umbrella siblings are overpowered and flee, but inadvertently leave the time travel briefcase at the Academy. They take shelter at Hotel Obsidian. As they plan their next move, Vanya goes to make a deal with the Sparrow Number One, Marcus, who agrees to return the briefcase if the Umbrella Academy siblings leave. This meeting is observed by Ben and Sparrow Number Three, Fei. Diego discovers he and Lila have a young son, Stan, and Lila leaves the boy with him. Elsewhere, an older man named Lester Pocket packs a suitcase and sets out for an unknown destination. When Marcus goes to get the briefcase, he discovers the Kugelblitz, a time anomaly caused by the crossing timelines, and is disintegrated. After witnessing this act of power, Grace, who now works as the Sparrows' maid, begins worshipping the Kugelblitz.
22	2	"World's Biggest Ball of Twine"	Cheryl Dunye	Jesse McKeown	June 22, 2022
When Luther goes out for a run, the Sparrows kidnap him, believing he and his siblings have Marcus. Lila attempts to leave the city but discovers that her briefcase no longer works. After learning that Sissy died in 1989, Vanya goes on a self-discovery journey, coming out as a transgender man and changing his name to Viktor. The rest of the family accepts him with open arms. Allison discovers that her daughter, Claire, does not exist in this timeline, spiraling her into grief and rage. Five and Klaus go to find Klaus's birth mother and discover that all of their mothers died before they were born in this timeline, creating a grandfather paradox. Diego and Stan bond after they fight Sparrow Number Four, Alphonso, and Number Six, Jayme. Allison and Viktor head to the handoff where Marcus was meant to give them the briefcase, but he does not show up. Unbeknownst to them, they are stalked by Lester. Luther bonds with Sloane (the fifth Sparrow) and, after being let go, goes back to meet with her and they have sex. Lila mimics Fei's powers and steals the briefcase. Further shockwaves from the growing Kugelblitz cause more waves of objects, humans, and animals to disappear.
23	3	"Pocket Full of Lightning"	Cheryl Dunye	Robert Askins	June 22, 2022
Five explains the grandfather paradox, and a lovesick Luther rejoins the Umbrella siblings. Five and Lila reluctantly team up to solve the time paradox, realizing neither of their briefcases work. Allison and Viktor negotiate with the Sparrows, with Allison falsely claiming they have Marcus and the Sparrows falsely claiming they have the briefcase. Allison's reckless behavior worries Viktor. Klaus confronts Reginald about their mothers, whom Reginald confirms he did not kill, and the two bond. Klaus also learns that the Sparrows keep Reginald medicated to keep him docile, and he teaches Reginald how to hide the pills without swallowing them. The Sparrows discover the Kugelblitz in the basement. The Sparrow and Umbrella siblings confront each other at Hotel Obsidian. The Umbrella siblings are almost defeated when Lester arrives and unleashes a burst of energy to save them, killing Alphonso and Jayme. Viktor recognizes Lester to be Harlan Cooper, Sissy's son.
24	4	"Kugelblitz"	Sylvain White	Aeryn Michelle Williams	June 22, 2022
Because Harlan could not control the powers he gained from Viktor in 1963, he and his mother lived a difficult life, needing to move constantly. When Sissy died, he had a violent outburst of power. In the present, he reconnects with Viktor. Allison uses her powers on Sloane, and discovers she does not know where the briefcase is. Frustrated, she and Diego go pick a fight in a bar known for racist clientele. Luther and Viktor return Sloane to the Sparrows as a peace offering, but Ben demands that they hand over Harlan as well. In the ruins of the Commission, Five and Lila find its Founder, an elderly future version of Five with a missing arm and a cryptic tattoo. Before he dies, he warns Five not to save the world. While playing in the Hotel, Klaus and Stan find a luxury suite called the White Buffalo, and Stan accidentally kills Klaus with a spear gun. Harlan finds the files on the Umbrella Academy's dead mothers. He reveals to Viktor that when Sissy died, his outburst killed their mothers and caused the grandfather paradox.
25	5	"Kindest Cut"	Sylvain White	Elizabeth Padden	June 22, 2022
Klaus awakens in the afterlife, where the Person on the Bike reveals that he has died over 50 times, but always returns to life because he is immortal. He reconnects with his dead mother, who tells him not to mourn her and to seek a sense of purpose. Five and Lila return, but the briefcase is destroyed in the process. They reveal that the grandfather paradox has created a Kugelblitz that will soon collapse all of existence. Diego finds out that Stan accidentally killed Klaus and comforts him, but as they move his body, Klaus returns to life. Lila and Diego restart their relationship. Desperate to escape her pain, Allison starts to use her powers to force herself on Luther but then stops. Horrified, Luther flees to find Sloane. The rest of the family agrees to hand Harlan over to the Sparrows so they can all focus on the Kugelblitz. Viktor feels guilty about the trauma his powers have caused Harlan and enlists Allison to sneak Harlan out of the Hotel. Klaus recognizes Five's future tattoo as belonging to a biker gang, the Mothers of Agony, who used to sell him drugs. Five goes to the gang's club and finds Pogo tattooing a biker.
26	6	"Marigold"	Jeff F. King	Lauren Otero	June 22, 2022
In 2014, Pogo is fired after a disagreement with Reginald over the Sparrows' training. He gives the Sparrows pills to sedate Reginald. In the present, Lila and Diego find a secret tunnel in the White Buffalo Suite which leads to an abandoned alternate version of the Hotel Obsidian, called Hotel Oblivion. Ben asks Luther to join the Sparrows. Pogo tells Five that the symbols in the tattoo connect to Project Oblivion, an obsession of Reginald's. Lila admits to Diego that Stan is not their son, but is her friend Trudy's child, and she is just babysitting. Harlan and Viktor succeed in transferring Harlan's powers to Viktor. Klaus tries to bond with his father and asks why the Reginald in the original timeline killed him repeatedly. To figure it out, Reginald experiments by electrocuting Klaus to death. A Guardian attacks Lila and Diego in the alternate hotel. They escape in time to see Stan consumed by the Kugelblitz. Harlan tells Allison that he killed the Umbrellas' mothers, thinking that she already knew. Blaming him for Claire's erasure, Allison kills him and delivers his body to the Sparrows.
27	7	"Auf Wiedersehen"	Kate Woods	Michelle Lovretta	June 22, 2022
In a flashback, Lila watches footage of the Handler's betrayal and travels to 1989 to retrieve a hidden briefcase. She meets Trudy there and recruits Trudy's son, Stan, into her plan to trick Diego. In the present, Reginald repeatedly kills Klaus, training him to reanimate more quickly. He takes Klaus to a graveyard to confront his fears, and Klaus successfully exorcises the ghosts. Allison is remorseless about murdering Harlan and blames Viktor for her losses. Lila, Sloane, Christopher, and Viktor combine their powers to trap the Kugelblitz in Christopher. Grace attacks them in return, and Five kills her. At the Academy, the group celebrates saving the world and Luther proposes to Sloane, who accepts. Lila reveals to Diego that she is pregnant with their child; she pretended Stan was their son to test Diego's parenting abilities. Five assures a grieving Viktor that saving Harlan would not have fixed their past failures. Fei and Ben clash over the Sparrow Academy's future and Christopher suddenly explodes, reopening the Kugelblitz, which kills Fei and forces everyone to escape.
28	8	"Wedding at the End of the World"	Paco Cabezas	Jesse McKeown & Aeryn Michelle Williams	June 22, 2022
In 1918, Reginald Hargreeves begins construction of the Hotel Obsidian. During its grand opening, he sends several soldiers down the secret tunnel and they are all slaughtered. In the present, the siblings take shelter at the hotel as Luther and Sloane announce their wedding. Reginald and Klaus arrive at the hotel, but none of the siblings are interested in what Reginald has to say. Luther asks Viktor to be his best man, and leaves a bitter Ben out of his bachelor party. Sloane calls Ben out for his sullen attitude, telling him to stop relying on being in charge. With Klaus' coaching, Reginald delivers a moving speech at the wedding reception. Viktor tries to reconcile with Allison, who refuses to forgive him. Klaus and a drunken Ben bond. The group (minus Allison) sits drunkenly in the courtyard as the Kugelblitz consumes the city above them. Luther remarks that he finally has the family he has always dreamed of. Five drunkenly overhears Reginald making a deal with someone in the White Buffalo Suite.
29	9	"Seven Bells"	Paco Cabezas	Robert Askins	June 22, 2022
A hungover Five tries to recall who was making a deal with Reginald the previous night. Allison apologizes to Luther and Viktor, but both suspect she is manipulating them. Reginald calls a meeting and explains that he built the Hotel Obsidian around a portal to the universe's "reset button", which he built as a mirror to the hotel called the Hotel Oblivion; the button requires seven people to pass through the secret tunnel and ring seven bells protected by a Guardian. Allison, Lila, Klaus, and Ben agree to the plan, but Diego, Viktor, Luther, Sloane, and Five outvote them and choose to stay. Reginald murders Luther and blames it on the Guardian, in order to motivate the group. Five remembers that Allison was the one with whom Reginald made a deal. The group flees through the tunnel and into the Hotel Oblivion as the Kugelblitz consumes the Hotel Obsidian. Klaus tries to follow but Reginald pushes him back, telling him he is too much of a liability. To ensure he goes to the afterlife, Klaus throws himself onto the horn of the white buffalo, killing himself.
30	10	"Oblivion"	Jeff F. King	Steve Blackman & Robert Askins	June 22, 2022
At the Hotel Oblivion, Five warns Viktor of Allison's actions. Reginald summons Guardians to attack the others while they search for a seven-fold symbol. The group defeats the Guardians, but Five's arm is severed. In the afterlife, Luther convinces Klaus to return to the living, where he exposes Reginald's treachery. Allison admits to Viktor that she did make a deal with Reginald, but had no idea that their brothers would die. Five spots a seven-star symbol on the lobby floor. Reginald forces all of them, except Allison, to step on the stars, activating the reset button. Realizing the process is killing them, Allison kills Reginald with an axe, and hits the reset button. In the rebuilt universe, Allison reunites with Claire and Ray. Luther is alive and no longer an ape-man and Five's arm has regenerated, but Sloane is missing and everyone has lost their powers. The group then goes their separate ways. A new version of Reginald and his now-resurrected wife Abigail observe the city, now under their control. Later, Ben rides a Seoul subway to an unknown destination.

== Production ==
=== Development ===
On November 10, 2020, Netflix renewed the series for the third season, which was released on June 22, 2022. While the series initially had a "TV-14" rating for its first two seasons, the maturity rating was increased to "TV-MA" for its third season, mainly due to an increase in profanity.

=== Writing ===
In June 2022, it was revealed, according to series creator Steve Blackman, that the season 3 scripts were complete when Elliot Page called him to share the news of his transition, with Blackman feeling it was "very important" that he and Page collaborate on incorporating Viktor's transition into the existing scripts. This led to Thomas Page McBee, who previously worked with Page on 2019's Tales of the City, being brought onboard to ensure that the storyline where Viktor comes out as trans was handled with care and respect.

=== Casting ===
On January 11, 2021, it was announced that Justin Cornwell, Britne Oldford, Genesis Rodriguez, Cazzie David, and Jake Epstein joined the cast as part of the Sparrow Academy for the third season. In January 2022, Javon Walton revealed in an interview he joined the cast in an undisclosed role for the third season.

=== Filming ===
Filming for the third season began on February 7, 2021, and concluded on August 28, 2021.

== Reception ==
=== Critical response ===
For the third season, Rotten Tomatoes reports a 91% approval rating with an average rating of 7.6/10, based on 57 reviews. The website's critics consensus reads, "The Umbrella Academy unfurls a bit beyond a manageable scope in this overstuffed season, but there remains all the gonzo creativity and resonant character relationships that fans enroll for." Metacritic, which uses a weighted average, assigned a score of 74 out of 100 based on 10 critics, indicating "generally favorable" reviews.

=== Accolades ===
Accolades received by The Umbrella Academy
Year	Award	Category	Recipient(s)	Result	Ref.
2022	Saturn Awards	Best Streaming Action-Adventure Television Series	The Umbrella Academy	Nominated	
2022	Saturn Awards	Best Supporting Actor in a Streaming Television Series	Elliot Page	Won	
2022	People's Choice Awards	The Sci-Fi/Fantasy Show of 2022	The Umbrella Academy	Nominated	
2023	Visual Effects Society Awards	Outstanding Animated Character in an Episode or Real-Time Project	Aidan Martin, Hannah Dockerty, Olivier Beierlein, Miae Kang	Won	
2023	Critics' Choice Super Awards	Best Actor in a Superhero Series, Limited Series or Made-for-TV Movie	Elliot Page	Nominated	
