= Jesse Noah Gruman =

Canadian male actor

- Gruman at The Hockey Sweater: A Musical world premiere in 2017
- Born: August 29, 2005 (age 20); Montreal, Quebec, Canada
- Occupation: Actor
- Notable work: The Umbrella Academy, The Kid Detective

Jesse Noah Gruman (born August 29, 2005) is a Canadian actor best known for his roles in The Kid Detective, after he first gained recognition when playing the role of young Harold Jenkins in the Netflix original, The Umbrella Academy. Gruman marked his first theatrical appearance when appearing in the dramatic mystery, The Song of Names as Zygmunt Rapoport. He was nominated for the Outstanding Lead Performance category at the 2018 META awards for his lead role in the world premiere of The Hockey Sweater: A Musical, and won Best Leading Actor at the BroadwayWorld awards for the same production.

== Early life ==
Gruman was born and raised in Montreal, Quebec. His artistic passion began when he took up violin at the age of three and started studying dance at the age of five.

== Career ==
Gruman made his professional debut playing his lead role in the world premiere of The Hockey Sweater: A Musical at the Segal Centre for Performing Arts. Gruman played the main role of Roch in the original cast, working closely alongside Donna Feore, Roch Carrier and Emil Sher. Later that year, Gruman was nominated at the 2018 META awards for Outstanding Lead Actor for his performance in the musical, and won Best Leading Actor at the Broadway World awards.

In 2018, Gruman went on to film the Netflix original The Umbrella Academy, in which he played the role of Young Harold. Later that year, Gruman went on to film The Song of Names, playing the son of Dovidl Rapoport, played by Clive Owen, Zygmunt Rapoport. This film marked his first theatrical appearance.

In 2020, Gruman marked his second theatrical appearance in The Kid Detective. He played the lead-supporting role formally known as young Abe, the kid detective. Adam Brody plays the lead role: the older version of their shared character, Abe Applebaum.

== Filmography ==
=== Film ===
Year	Title	Role	Notes
2019	The Song of Names	Zygmunt Rapoport	
2020	The Kid Detective	Young Abe	Shared role with Adam Brody
2020	The Stringless Violin	Director	
2022	Blind Willow, Sleeping Woman	Junpei	

=== Television ===
Year	Title	Role
2019	The Umbrella Academy	Young Harold Jenkins

=== Video games ===
Year	Title	Role
2019	Tom Clancy's Ghost Recon Breakpoint	Actor
2019	Far Cry New Dawn	Actor (Ethan)

== Theatre ==
Year	Title	Role	Notes
2017	The Hockey Sweater: A Musical	Roch	Lead, World Premiere

== Awards and nominations ==
=== Theatre ===
Year	Association	Category	Work	Result
2018	Montreal English Theatre Awards (META)	Outstanding Lead Actor	The Hockey Sweater: A Musical	Nominated
2019	BroadwayWorld Montreal Awards	Best Leading Actor (Musical)	The Hockey Sweater: A Musical	Won
