= We Only See Each Other at Weddings and Funerals =

- The Umbrella Academy episode
- Episode no.: Season 1 Episode 1
- Directed by: Peter Hoar
- Teleplay by: Jeremy Slater
- Original release date: February 15, 2019
- Running time: 59 minutes

Guest appearances
- Sheila McCarthy as Agnes Rofa; Justin H. Min as Ben Hargreeves; Jordan Claire Robbins as Grace

Episode chronology
← Previous —	Next → "Run Boy Run"

"We Only See Each Other at Weddings and Funerals" is the series premiere of the American superhero comedy drama television series The Umbrella Academy, based on the comic book series of the same name. The episode, which was originally released on Netflix on February 15, 2019, was directed by Peter Hoar and written by series developer Jeremy Slater.

== Plot ==
On October 1, 1989, forty-three women give birth to forty-three children, despite none of them showing any sign of pregnancy until labor began. Seven of those children were adopted by eccentric billionaire Sir Reginald Hargreeves, and turned into a superhero team known as "The Umbrella Academy". In the present, five of these children, now grown up, live separate lives. Number One / Luther lives on the moon, Number Two / Diego stops a home invasion, Number Three / Allison walks on the red carpet at a film premiere, Number Four / Klaus leaves rehab and immediately begins to use drugs, and Number Seven / Vanya plays the violin. After watching the news, they all learn about Reginald's death.

The children decide to reunite in their old home, the academy, to talk about their father's death. Visiting his father's bedroom, Luther begins to suspect that his father was murdered by one of the others, as his monocle is missing. Diego reassures Luther that the coroner stated that Reginald died of heart failure but Luther remains suspicious. In a flashback to the Umbrella Academy's first public appearance, the academy successfully stop a bank robbery. Reginald and Vanya watch the action from a rooftop, and Vanya asks why she can't help. Reginald tells Vanya that she just isn't special, and later in an interview, he tells the public that he adopted six children, instead of seven.

Back in the present, a lightning storm causes the group to go outside. Once there, they watch as a young Number Five, one of the siblings, arrives at the academy through a strange ball of blue energy. Five explains that he traveled to the future, came back, and became stuck in his 13-year-old body, though he's actually a 58-year-old man. Later, the group holds a funeral for Reginald. In a flashback, Reginald trains and monitors all the children. He also gives all of them a tattoo of an umbrella on their wrists, except Vanya, who draws her own umbrella tattoo using a pen. In the present, the group part ways.

Five visits a coffee shop, where he kills several men who try to kidnap him. At a river, Diego is revealed to have taken Reginald's monocle, which he dumps in a river. Klaus, who has the ability to speak to the dead, begins to talk with his dead brother, Number Six / Ben. The episode ends with Five visiting Vanya, where he tells her that in eight days the human race will come to an end, but he doesn't know why or how.

== Production ==
"We Only See Each Other at Weddings and Funerals" was written by series developer Jeremy Slater. The opening scene was filmed in the Wallace Emerson Community Centre, the bank sequence was filmed at the LIUNA Station, and Vanya's introduction took place in the Elgin Theatre.

The episode features a cover of the 1967 single "I Think We're Alone Now". The original version of the song appears during the final moments of the series finale, "End of the Beginning".

== Reception ==
=== Critical reception ===
On Vulture, the episode received a rating of 5/5 stars, with journalist Scott Meslow praising the pacing of the episode, especially the opening montage, stating that "In a kinetic, terrifically edited montage — set to a violin medley of songs from Phantom of the Opera, of all things — we are formally introduced to the Hargreeves children." Kate Kosturski, writing for the online website Multiversity Comics, applauded the development of the episode and its finale, stating that "As with any good premiere, the majority of this episode built the world of the Hargreeves family, but we get a taste of what’s to come this season in the last act."

=== Accolades ===
At the 2020 ADG Excellence in Production Design Award, "We Only See Each Other at Weddings and Funerals" won the award for Excellence in Production Design for a One-Hour Contemporary Single-Camera Series. At the 71st Primetime Creative Arts Emmy Awards, the episode was nominated for the Outstanding Production Design for a Narrative Contemporary Program (One Hour or More) Emmy award.
