= Blind Willow, Sleeping Woman (film) =

2022 French-Canadian-Luxemburgian-Dutch animated film

- French: Saules aveugles, femme endormie
- Directed by: Pierre Földes
- Written by: Pierre Földes
- Based on: Blind Willow, Sleeping Woman; The Elephant Vanishes; After the Quake; by Haruki Murakami
- Produced by: Pierre Baussaron; Tom Dercourt; Emmanuel-Alain Raynal; Pierre Urbain; David Mouraire; Luc Déry; Kim McCraw; Galilé Marion-Gauvin; Antoine Coutant; Pierre Földes; Joost de Vries
- Cinematography: Étienne Boilard
- Edited by: Kara Blake
- Music by: Pierre Földes
- Production companies: Miyu Productions; Cinéma Defacto; Doghouse Films; micro_scope; Productions L'Unité Centrale; An Original Picture; Studio MA; Arte France Cinéma; Auvergne-Rhône-Alpes Cinéma
- Distributed by: Gébéka Films (France); Maïson 4:3 (Canada); Bantam Film (Netherlands)
- Release date: June 15, 2022 (Annecy)
- Running time: 108 minutes
- Countries: Canada; France; Luxembourg; Netherlands
- Languages: French; English
- Box office: $66,612

Blind Willow, Sleeping Woman (French: Saules aveugles, femme endormie) is a 2022 animated anthology drama film written, produced, directed and composed by Pierre Földes. An international co-production of Canada, France, Luxembourg and the Netherlands, the film, set in Tokyo shortly after the 2011 Tōhoku earthquake and tsunami, adapts six short stories from three collections by Japanese author Haruki Murakami, Blind Willow, Sleeping Woman, The Elephant Vanishes and After the Quake (including "Blind Willow, Sleeping Woman", “Birthday Girl”, "The Wind-up Bird and Tuesday's Women", "UFO in Kushiro", and "Super-Frog Saves Tokyo"), focusing on a bank employee who is enlisted by a talking frog to assist him in saving the city from destruction by a giant subterranean worm. To create a version of 3D motion capture animation within a 2D film, Földes filmed his entire screenplay as a live-action "reference" performance, following which the animators replaced the actors' heads with 3D models and then traced and animated their facial expressions. The voice cast includes Marcello Arroyo, Michael Czyz, Zag Dorison, Földes, Jesse Noah Gruman, Katharine King So, John Vamvas, Nadia Verrucci and Shoshana Wilder.

Blind Willow, Sleeping Woman premiered in the feature film competition at the 2022 Annecy International Animation Film Festival, where it was awarded a Jury Distinction, and was later screened at the 2022 Toronto International Film Festival as part of the festival's Contemporary World Cinema section.

== Reception ==
The review aggregator Rotten Tomatoes reported an approval rating of 77% based on 26 reviews, with an average rating of 6.9/10.

The film was nominated for Best Animated Film at the 29th Lumière Awards in 2024.
