= List of The Umbrella Academy characters =

The Umbrella Academy is a comic book series created and written by Gerard Way and illustrated by Gabriel Bá. It was adapted into a television series on Netflix, with three ten-episode seasons and a final six-episode season.

The Umbrella Academy features seven super-powered children: Luther Hargreeves, who has super-strength and durability; Diego Hargreeves, who has trajectory manipulation allowing him to control projectiles; Allison Hargreeves, who can influence people to her command with the phrase "I heard a rumor...", followed by what she wants to happen; Klaus Hargreeves, who can communicate with and summon the dead; Five Hargreeves, who can teleport and time-travel; Ben Hargreeves, who can summon monstrous tentacles from his torso; and Vanya Hargreeves (later Viktor Hargreeves in the television adaptation) (Note: In the television adaptation, the character changes his name to Viktor Hargreeves during the third season after transitioning.) who can control sound waves. All the children were adopted by Sir Reginald Hargreeves, and transformed into the superhero team called "the Umbrella Academy".

== Overview ==
Character	Portrayed by	Appearances			
Character	Portrayed by	Season 1	Season 2	Season 3	Season 4
Main characters
Vanya Hargreeves / Viktor Hargreeves / The White Violin / Umbrella Number Seven	Elliot Page (Note: In seasons 1, 2 and 4, T.J. McGibbon plays a teenaged Vanya.) (Note: In seasons 1, 2 and 4, Marija Mauer plays a teenaged Vanya and is uncredited for her appearances.) (Note: In seasons 1 and 2, Alyssa Gervasi plays a four year old Vanya.)	Main	Main	Main	Main
Luther Hargreeves / Spaceboy / Umbrella Number One	Tom Hopper (Note: In seasons 1, 2 and 4, Cameron Brodeur plays a teenaged Luther.)	Main	Main	Main	Main
Diego Hargreeves / The Kraken / Umbrella Number Two	David Castañeda (Note: In seasons 1, 2 and 4, Blake Talabis plays a teenaged Diego.)	Main	Main	Main	Main
Allison Hargreeves / The Rumor /Umbrella Number Three	Emmy Raver-Lampman (Note: In seasons 1, 2 and 4, Eden Cupid plays a teenaged Allison.) (Note: In season 2, Jordana Blake plays a four year old Allison.)	Main	Main	Main	Main
Klaus Hargreeves / The Séance / Umbrella Number Four	Robert Sheehan (Note: In seasons, 1, 2, 3 and 4 Dante Albidone plays a teenaged Klaus.) (Note: In season 1, Charles Cameron plays an eight year old Klaus.) (Note: In season 3, Oliver Kirton plays a younger Klaus.)	Main	Main	Main	Main
Five Hargreeves / The Boy / Umbrella Number Five	Aidan Gallagher (Note: In seasons 1, 2 and 3, Sean Sullivan plays an elderly Five.) (Note: In season 1, Jim Watson plays a middle aged Five.)	Main	Main	Main	Main
Cha-Cha	Mary J. Blige	Main	Stand-in		
Hazel	Cameron Britton	Main	Guest		Guest
Leonard Peabody / Harold Jenkins	John Magaro (Note: In season 1, Jesse Noah Gruman plays a teenaged Harold.)	Main			
Pogo	Adam Godley (Note: Godley provides the voice and facial performance capture, while Ken Hall serves as body-double for the motion capture to play the character on set.)	Main (Note: Godley portrays an alternate timeline version of Pogo in the third season.)	Main	Main	Guest
Sir Reginald Hargreeves / The Monocle	Colm Feore	Main (Note: Feore portrays an alternate timeline version of Reginald in the third and fourth season.)	Main	Main	Main
Ben Hargreeves / The Horror / Umbrella Number Six	Justin H. Min (Note: In seasons 1, 2 and 4, Ethan Hwang plays a teenaged Ben.)	Recurring	Main		Guest (Note: In season 4, Ben is only portrayed by Ethan Hwang as a teenaged Ben in a flashback.)
Ben Hargreeves / Sparrow Number Two	Justin H. Min		Main (Note: Although credited as a main cast member, Min only portrays the alternate-timeline Ben Hargreeves known as Number Two in one episode of season 2.)	Main	Main
Lila Pitts	Ritu Arya (Note: In season 2, Sarah Navaratnam plays a fifteen year old Lila.) (Note: In season 2, Raya Korah plays a ten year old Lila.) (Note: In season 2, Anjana Vernuganan plays a four year old Lila.)		Main	Main	Main
Raymond Chestnut	Yusuf Gatewood		Main	Recurring	
Sissy Cooper / Dana Pocket	Marin Ireland		Main	Guest	
The Handler	Kate Walsh	Recurring	Main	Special Guest (Note: Voice only.)	Guest
Sloane Hargreeves / Sparrow Number Five	Genesis Rodriguez		Stand-in	Main	
Fei Hargreeves / Sparrow Number Three	Britne Oldford		Stand-in	Main	
Recurring characters
Agnes Rofa	Sheila McCarthy	Recurring			Guest
Grace Hargreeves / Mom	Jordan Claire Robbins	Recurring (Note: Robbins portrays the human version of Grace in the second season and an alternate timeline version of Grace in the third.)	Recurring	Recurring	Guest
Syd	Murray Furrow	Recurring			
Detective Eudora Patch	Ashley Madekwe	Recurring			
Detective Chuck Beaman	Rainbow Sun Francks	Recurring			
Lance Biggs	Zachary Bennett	Recurring			
The Conductor	Peter Outerbridge	Recurring			
David "Dave" J. Katz	Cody Ray Thompson	Recurring			
David "Dave" J. Katz	Calem MacDonald (Note: As young Dave.)		Recurring		
Elliott	Kevin Rankin		Recurring		
Axel	Kris Holden-Ried		Recurring		Guest
Jack Ruby	John Kapelos		Recurring		
Carl Cooper	Stephen Bogaert		Recurring		
Odessa	Raven Dauda		Recurring		
Miles	Dewshane Williams		Recurring		
Otto	Jason Bryden		Recurring		Guest
Oscar	Tom Sinclair		Recurring		Guest
Harlan Cooper / Lester Pocket	Justin Paul Kelly		Recurring	Guest	
Harlan Cooper / Lester Pocket	Callum Keith Rennie			Recurring	
Hoyt Hillenkoetter	Robert Verlaque		Recurring		
Keechie	Dov Tiefenbach		Recurring		
Dot	Patrice Goodman	Guest	Recurring	Guest	Guest
Herb	Ken Hall	Guest	Recurring	Guest	Guest
A.J. Carmichael	Robin Atkin Downes (Note: Downes provided uncredited voice work.)		Recurring		
Jill	Mouna Traoré		Recurring		
Mr. Edelman	Peter Schoelier		Recurring		
Alphonso Hargreeves / Sparrow Number Four	Jake Epstein		Stand-in	Recurring	
Jayme Hargreeves / Sparrow Number Six	Cazzie David		Stand-in	Recurring	
Stanley "Stan"	Javon "Wanna" Walton			Recurring	
Chet Rodo	Julian Richings			Recurring	
Sy Grossman	David Cross				Recurring
Dr. Gene Thibodeau	Nick Offerman				Recurring
Dr. Jean Thibodeau	Megan Mullally				Recurring
Claire Hargreeves	Coco Assad	Guest		Guest	
Claire Hargreeves	Millie Davis				Recurring
CIA Deputy Director Lance Ribbons	Martin Roach				Recurring
Derek	Zack Binder				Recurring
Jennifer / Rosie	Victoria Sawal				Recurring
Abigail Hargreeves	Liisa Repo-Martell	Guest		Guest	Recurring
Quinn	George Tchortov				Recurring
Bea	Jessica Greco				Recurring

== The Umbrella Academy ==
=== Sir Reginald Hargreeves ===
Sir Reginald Hargreeves
- The Umbrella Academy character
- First appearance: Comics: The Umbrella Academy: Apocalypse Suite (2007); Television: We Only See Each Other at Weddings and Funerals (episode 1.01; 2019)
- Created by: Gerard Way (creator); Gabriel Bá (illustrator)
- Adapted by: Steve Blackman
- Portrayed by: Colm Feore

In-universe information
- Nickname: Reggie
- Species: Alien
- Occupation: Entrepreneur and scientist
- Affiliation: The Umbrella Academy; The Sparrow Academy (alternate timeline; TV series)
- Spouse: Abigail (TV series)
- Children: Original timeline: The Umbrella Academy (adopted children); Alternate timelines: The Sparrow Academy (adopted children; TV series season 3); The Phoenix Academy (adopted children; TV series season 4, ep. 4)
- Nationality: English

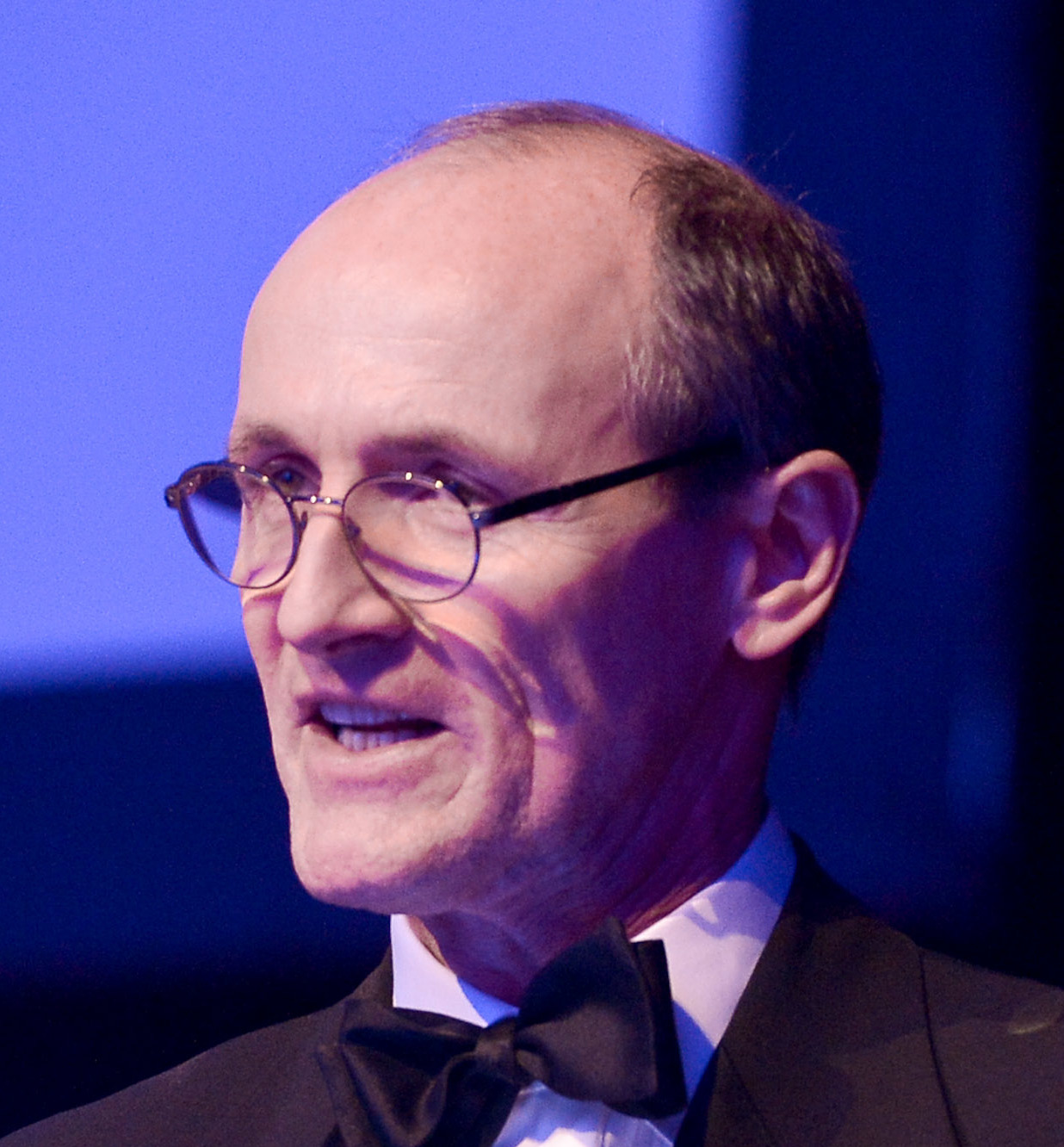
Colm Feore portrays Sir Reginald Hargreeves.

Sir Reginald Hargreeves, also known as The Monocle, is an alien disguised as a wealthy entrepreneur and world-renowned scientist. He received the Nobel Prize for his work in the cerebral advancement of the chimpanzee and founded the Umbrella Academy, a group of adopted super-powered children. Sir Reginald is cold-hearted, often mistreating and even experimenting on the children for his personal interests. He refuses to let the children call him father, demanding that they address him by his codename The Monocle instead. When speaking to the children, he refers to them by number, which was assigned to the children in terms of "usefulness", and has nothing to do with their actual destructive capabilities.

In the television series, Reginald is portrayed by Colm Feore and appears in all four seasons in a main role. Feore joined the series in February 2018. He is revealed in the first season finale to be an alien from another planet who came to Earth following the death of his wife and the destruction of his home planet. Before leaving, he unleashed a jar of golden particles (largely implied to be the "marigolds" that brought the 43 children into existence). Upon arriving to Earth, he created an umbrella manufacturing company and became a billionaire entrepreneur. In 1920, he completed construction of the Hotel Obsidian, which he intentionally built near an alternate dimension that would supposedly rewrite the world. He sent a group of soldiers to eliminate the guardians of the alternate universe, but they were all slaughtered and Reginald presumably gave up on the mission.

In the first episode of the series, he kills himself (a fact that is not revealed until later in the season) to reunite the children for his funeral and stop the apocalypse. He appears in the second season as a younger version of himself who works for the Majestic 12. In the sixth episode, he meets with his children at a tropical bar as they ask them for help in stopping the apocalypse and, while taunting them, gives Five advice on controlling his powers (which he uses to reverse time in the season finale). Later in the season, Reginald reveals his alien persona and kills the Majestic 12.

The third season reveals that following the meeting at the tropical bar with the Umbrella siblings, he chose to adopt a new set of children in 1989, dubbing them The Sparrow Academy, who have ousted the Umbrellas in the present. He is also significantly different from his original counterpart, having been sedated for years by his children, following a disagreement in 2014 with an alternate Pogo which led to his assistant leaving and bestowing the pills to the Sparrows. He is soon taken off these pills by Klaus, and regains his abrasive personality and goals: specifically, his ambition to take his children to the alternate dimension in the Hotel Obsidian (dubbed Hotel Oblivion). He also helps Klaus expand his powers and discover his immortality, using the time with his son to manipulate him to his side. Following the expansion of the Kugelblitz, Reginald proposes to the Umbrellas and Sparrows an idea to head to Hotel Oblivion, recounting a mythic tale that suggests seven bells and a sigil that will allow someone to rewrite the universe. When the Umbrellas and Sparrows vote to remain in the original universe and await the apocalypse, Reginald kills Luther and uses the opportunity to take everyone to Oblivion to complete his mission. It is also revealed that, despite seemingly having no reason to do so, he did in fact send Luther to the moon for a purpose: to guard Reginald’s deceased wife who has been conserved in a cryogenic chamber in space. When it is discovered that Reginald’s children were the people meant to represent the seven bells (in a process that would drain their powers and kill them), Allison kills Reginald and resets the universe. This new universe shows that Reginald has gained control over the city, and his wife has mysteriously been resurrected.

=== Luther Hargreeves ===
Luther Hargreeves
- The Umbrella Academy character
- First appearance: Comics: The Umbrella Academy: Apocalypse Suite (2007); Television: We Only See Each Other at Weddings and Funerals (episode 1.01; 2019)
- Created by: Gerard Way (creator); Gabriel Bá (illustrator)
- Adapted by: Steve Blackman
- Portrayed by: Tom Hopper; Cameron Brodeur (young)

In-universe information
- Aliases: Spaceboy; Number One
- Species: Human-ape hybrid
- Occupation: Security guard and underground fighter (season 2)
- Affiliation: The Umbrella Academy
- Family: Diego Hargreeves (adoptive brother); Allison Hargreeves (adoptive sister); Klaus Hargreeves (adoptive brother); Five Hargreeves (adoptive brother); Ben Hargreeves (adoptive brother; original timeline); Viktor Hargreeves (adoptive brother)
- Spouses: Sloane Hargreeves (TV series)
- Origin: Sweden
- Nationality: American
- Abilities: Superhuman strength & durability

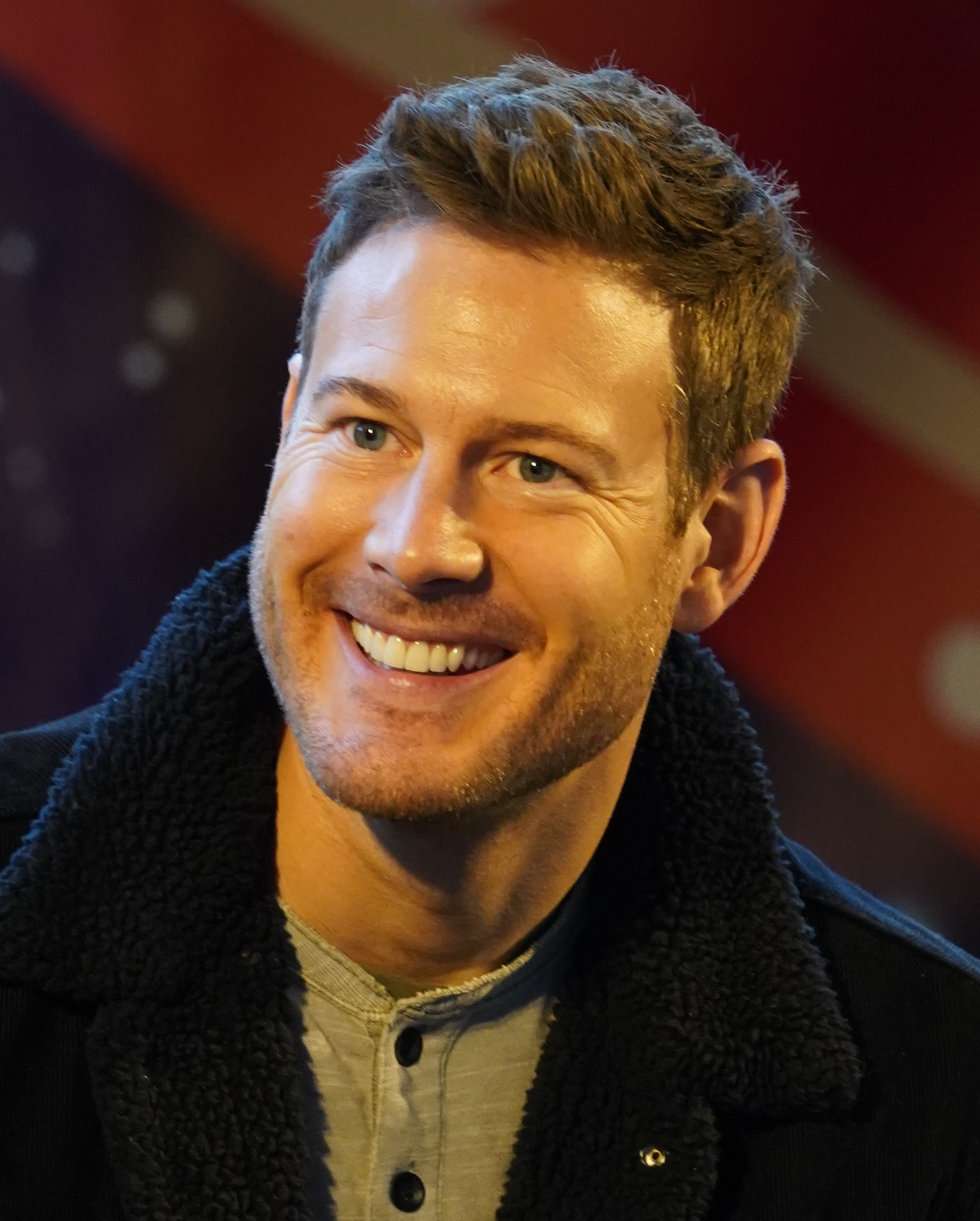
Tom Hopper portrays Luther Hargreeves.

Luther Hargreeves, also known as Number One or his superhero alter-ego Spaceboy, is the primary and longest-lasting member of the Umbrella Academy. Luther's principal powers are super-strength and durability. He is portrayed by Tom Hopper as an adult and Cameron Brodeur as a teenager in the television adaptation.

After a disastrous mission, Sir Reginald Hargreeves performed surgery on Luther, replacing his body with that of a Martian gorilla, hinted to be the same that damaged his original body. Luther is then sent into the moon for four years and returns following the death of his father. In the comics, he has been shown to have somewhat of a love interest in Number Three, Allison.

In the television adaptation, Luther still retains his ape-like figure and moon backstory, the main difference being that, rather than surgically replacing his body, Reginald injected a gorilla serum into Luther to save his life, turning him into a human-ape hybrid with hairy legs, wrinkly gray skin on his arms and a slightly hairy torso. His body can withstand the vacuum and cold of space as long as he has a helmet on. Using his super strength, he primarily fights hand-to-hand. After his career with The Umbrella Academy, he moved to the moon, in a mission secretly meant to guard Reginald's wife Abigail in cryogenesis. The adaptation also keeps the relationship between Luther and his adopted sister Allison.

The A.V. Club highlighted that in the first season of the television adaptation, Luther immediately starts investigating Reginald's death. In the process, he discovers that Reginald ignored him the entire time he was on the moon, leading him to believe it was a pointless mission, sending Luther into a depressive episode. He also supports Number Five in trying to avert the "apocalypse; when it becomes clear that Vanya and her previously unknown powers are to blame, Luther locks her up. This drives Vanya to give in to her destructive abilities and go on a rampage that ends up causing the apocalypse, but by the time moon debris is actually falling on the planet, Luther recognizes how he hurt Vanya and agrees to bring her with as his siblings decide to go back in time and take another swing at saving the world". In the second season, during the 1960s in Dallas, Luther begins to work for Jack Ruby as a club security guard and as an underground fighter. In the comic’s Dallas storyline, Luther became morbidly obese as part of his struggle with depression. While Luther overeats in the second season, the television adaptation creators decided to avoid the obesity plot after a similar transformation occurred to Thor in Avengers: Endgame. He also begins to get over his relationship with Allison after discovering that she married a man named Raymond Chestnut.

In the third season, he begins to embrace the normal life he never got to have. Having progressed into a better version of himself, he no longer listens to Reginald and dismisses the pressure that the latter tries to place on the team. Moving on from Allison, he meets Sloane Hargreeves from the Sparrow Academy timeline and the two quickly fall in love. Shortly after he proposes to Sloane and she accepts, however, the Kugelblitz (created after the Umbrellas arrived in the present) expands, resulting in a majority of the world being swallowed and forcing the Umbrellas and remaining Sparrows to take shelter at the Hotel Obsidian. While there, Luther and Sloane take the opportunity to get married in the time they have left and hold a lavish "wedding at the end of the world". When Reginald proposes the idea to go into Hotel Obsidian for one final mission, Luther and Sloane refuse, citing their desire to spend their last moments together. In retaliation, Reginald kills Luther and uses the opportunity to send the rest of the team (including a grieving Sloane) into Oblivion. In the afterlife, Luther communicates with Klaus (who also died at the hands of Reginald) and successfully convinces him to use his immortality to return to the real world. Later, Klaus successfully conjures Luther's spirit, who subdues a guardian and shares one final goodbye with Sloane. After the world is reset, Luther returns to life and discovers he no longer has his ape physique but also finds that Sloane is missing. He departs from the group with Klaus in tow to go out and find Sloane.

=== Diego Hargreeves ===
Diego Hargreeves
- The Umbrella Academy character
- First appearance: Comics: The Umbrella Academy: Apocalypse Suite (2007); Television: We Only See Each Other at Weddings and Funerals (episode 1.01; 2019)
- Created by: Gerard Way (creator); Gabriel Bá (illustrator)
- Adapted by: Steve Blackman
- Portrayed by: David Castañeda; Blake Talabis (young)

In-universe information
- Aliases: The Kraken; Number Two
- Affiliation: The Umbrella Academy
- Weapon: Throwing knives
- Family: Luther Hargreeves (adoptive brother); Allison Hargreeves (adoptive sister); Klaus Hargreeves (adoptive brother); Five Hargreeves (adoptive brother); Ben Hargreeves (adoptive brother; original timeline); Viktor Hargreeves (adoptive brother)
- Significant others: Lila Pitts; Eudora Patch (ex-girlfriend)
- Origin: Mexico
- Nationality: American
- Abilities: Trajectory manipulation Enhanced lung capacity (comics)

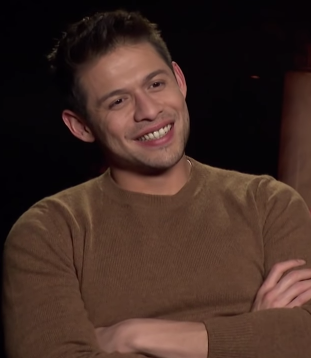
David Castañeda portrays Diego Hargreeves, a Mexican American in the series adaptation.

Diego Hargreeves, also known as Number Two or his superhero alter-ego The Kraken, is the reckless and rebellious member of the group, as described by Reginald Hargreeves. His main ability in the comics allows him to hold his breath indefinitely. He also has a strong talent for knife-throwing (he can change the direction of projectiles in midair; also, though it has not been explored, he may be able to use mild telekinesis) and close-quarter combat. He and Luther have a clear rivalry, and Diego is often unwilling to take orders from Luther. In his teenage years, he was the bassist in the punk rock band the Prime-8s alongside drummer Body (Inspector Lupo's assistant), and guitarist and lead vocalist Vanya Hargreeves / Number Seven (his adoptive sister), whom he has romantic feelings for.

He is portrayed by David Castañeda as an adult and Blake Talabis as a teenager. While Diego being white in the comics, this adaptation of him hails from Mexico and Diego is depicted as a Latino American. He is introduced as a vigilante who got kicked out of the police academy and now uses his powers to fight crime that police do not. He previously dated Eudora Patch, but the two broke up prior to the start of the series. His rivalry with Luther and the other siblings stays the same in the show, and he constantly attempts to meddle in police investigations relevant to the series, much to Patch's chagrin. When Patch is killed while trying to rescue Klaus, Diego is the first to discover her body and swears revenge on her killers, Hazel and Cha-Cha. He fails to kill Hazel (Five knocks out Diego after he attacks the assassin and lets Hazel go), but he manages to subdue Cha-Cha. Just as he is about to kill her, he decides to spare her, opting instead to let her go as a way to honor Patch's memory.

In the second season, he finds himself in a psychiatric hospital after being arrested for attempting to murder Lee Harvey Oswald, prior to JFK's assassination. He meets fellow inmate Lila Pitts and the two devise a plan to escape, and she tags along on his family's attempt to save the world. He initially refuses to believe Lila is a part of the Commission when she is exposed, but Lila later drugs him and takes him to the Handler (her adoptive mother) and recruits him. He eventually escapes with employee Herb's help and assists in freeing Viktor from the FBI, afterwards failing to save JFK, much to his disappointment. At Sissy Cooper's farm, he is confronted by Lila and The Handler, and is able to talk Lila down and help her realize who the Handler truly is. After The Handler is gunned down by a Swedish assassin, he allows Lila to take the time-traveling briefcase and escape, leaving behind a bracelet the two made at the mental hospital.

In the third season, he quickly reunites with Lila, but she instead leaves him with a 12-year-old boy named Stan, claiming he is their son. He initially protests the idea of being a father, but later warms up to Stan and helps him in his troubles. This includes protecting him in a drugstore following a fight with The Sparrows, aiding him in hiding a dead Klaus' body (although the latter comes back to life shortly afterwards), and heading into Hotel Oblivion with Lila to find him, losing two fingers in the process. He soon discovers that Stan is not actually their child, but Lila reveals to him that she is actually pregnant; she enlisted Stan's ruse to test how Diego would react to being a parent out of fear of him rejecting her. He quickly chooses to stay in Lila and the baby's life, and does everything to save the world to keep Lila alive, even choosing to go back into the Hotel Oblivion to reset the universe (though he changes his mind later, much to Lila's annoyance). When Lila expresses her fears of being a bad parent (similar to The Handler), Diego reassures her she will not be such as long as she tries. The two are together when the universe is rewritten, and both are shocked to discover they have lost their powers. When Lila suggests they make the best of their predicament and live their lives, Diego takes her hand and the two depart together to start their new family.

=== Allison Hargreeves ===
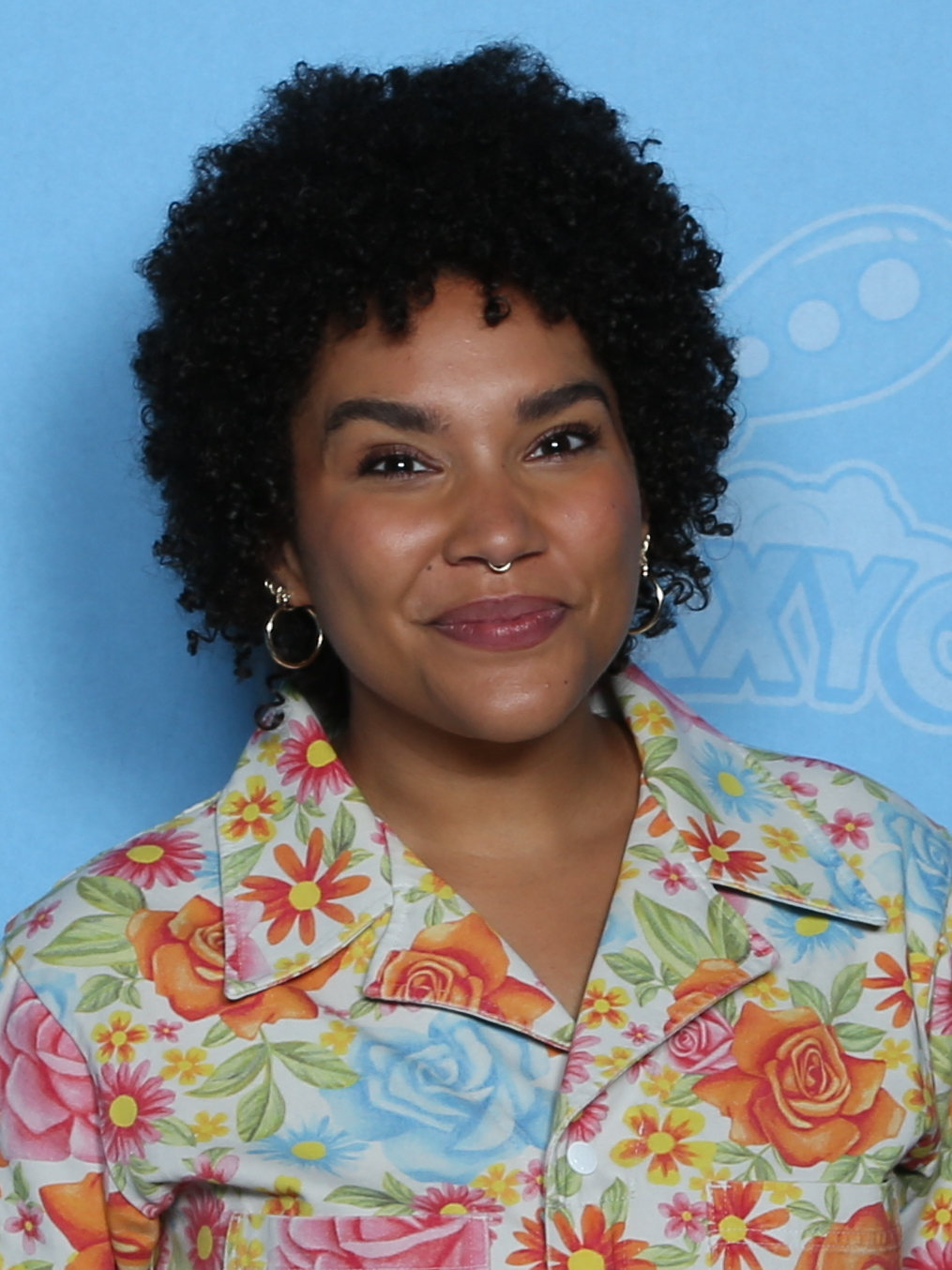
Emmy Raver-Lampman portrays Allison, who is a black woman in the television adaptation.

Allison Hargreeves
- The Umbrella Academy character
- First appearance: Comics: The Umbrella Academy: Apocalypse Suite (2007); Television: We Only See Each Other at Weddings and Funerals (episode 1.01; 2019)
- Created by: Gerard Way (creator); Gabriel Bá (illustrator)
- Adapted by: Steve Blackman
- Portrayed by: Emmy Raver-Lampman; Eden Cupid (teen); Jordana Blake (young)

In-universe information
- Aliases: The Rumor; Number Three
- Occupation: Actress; Civil rights activist (season 2)
- Affiliation: The Umbrella Academy
- Spouses: Raymond Chestnut (TV series); Patrick (ex-husband)
- Children: Claire (daughter)
- Relatives: Luther Hargreeves (adoptive brother); Diego Hargreeves (adoptive brother); Klaus Hargreeves (adoptive brother); Five Hargreeves (adoptive brother); Ben Hargreeves (adoptive brother; original timeline); Viktor Hargreeves (adoptive brother)
- Origin: South Africa
- Nationality: American
- Abilities: Mind control Reality warping

Allison Hargreeves, also known as Number Three or by her superhero alter-ego The Rumor, is the third member of the Umbrella Academy. Described as narcissistic, she has the ability to manipulate reality by lying, using the phrase "I heard a rumor..." to activate the power. After her career with The Umbrella Academy, she married her boyfriend, Patrick, and had a daughter named Claire. The couple has since divorced, and Patrick has full custody of their daughter, due to Allison using her special ability on Claire. She has a cybernetic left hand as Dr. Terminal devoured her original hand when she was a child. In Dallas, when she goes to get vocal surgery, her arm is no longer drawn as if it were mechanical, suggesting that it too had been fixed. She is romantically linked to her adoptive brother, Luther Hargreeves. In the comics, their love for each other is unconsummated as Luther sees himself as a monstrosity due to his gorilla body. However, in the television adaptation, the two hook up before and after Allison's marriage. In both the comics and show, Allison uses her ability of suggestion to make her husband Patrick fall in love with her; after they divorce, Allison ends up with limited custody of their child. In the adaptation, Patrick eventually discovers that Allison has used her ability on their daughter Claire which leads to their divorce.

During the events of Apocalypse Suite, Allison had her throat slit by Vanya (as the White Violin) to prevent Allison from utilizing her power. Saved by Luther, she was able to survive but was told she could never speak again. As a result, she was forced to communicate via a note pad. While she and her family were forced to live in the bunker beneath the academy's ruins, Allison tortured the slightly amnesiac and disabled Vanya by forcing Vanya to remember and relive her rampage. After her surgery, however, Allison had felt remorse and empathetic towards her sibling, and began to support Vanya in physical therapy.

Allison is portrayed in the series by Emmy Raver-Lampman; as a teenager she is portrayed by Eden Cupid. Unlike the comics, in the series, she is a black woman. The first season shows her returning from her career as an actress and struggling to connect with her daughter; she often tends to cope in unhealthy ways such as smoking and taking it out on her siblings such as Viktor. She states that she refuses to use her power again after she realized how much it controlled her life and haunted her. She looks out for Viktor when the latter falls in love with Leonard Peabody, who Allison is suspicious of. She discovers his criminal past and warns Viktor, but is dismissed. When she heads to a cabin and discovers Viktor's powers, she suddenly remembers a memory from her childhood, in which Reginald forced Allison to rumor Viktor into thinking he was ordinary. Enraged, Viktor uses his powers to destroy the cabin, accidentally slitting Allison's throat in the process. Allison survives the injury but loses her ability to speak, as well as her power. In an attempt to stop Viktor from ending the world, Allison fires a gun right next to Viktor's ear, causing him to pass out and send a beam of energy towards the moon and destroy the world.

In the second season, she lands in Dallas in the year 1961; after being chased and harassed by several white men, she seeks shelter in a black hair salon run by Odessa. She is given a job there and spends two years in Texas; during that time, she becomes a civil rights activist, regains her voice, and marries a man named Raymond Chestnut. She initially does not disclose her powers to Ray and begins to feel proud about the things she's earned without her power. When the threat of the apocalypse arises once more, she inquires of the possibility to reunite with her daughter and, after having to use her ability in front of Ray following a sit-in protest, discloses her powers to him. She also makes amends with Luther and the two agree to move on from their relationship. She and Ray are later attacked by a pair of Swedish assassins and Allison is once again forced to use her power to save Ray, using it to rumor one of them into killing the other. She later joins Diego and Klaus in freeing Viktor from the FBI, making the decision to leave Ray behind, as the two share a tearful goodbye. She also accompanies them to the Cooper farm, where she fights Lila. Lila, who is revealed to have the ability to mirror other powers, turns Allison's power against her, leaving her unable to breathe until she's saved by Luther.

In the third season, she travels to L.A. to reunite with Claire, only to discover that Claire does not exist. This sends Allison into a spiral of grief and rage, and she begins to make reckless decisions and being cold to those close to her. When Luther goes to be with Sloane, Allison uses her powers to sexually assault him, stopping very quickly after almost getting hurt. She assists Viktor in sneaking Harlan out of Hotel Obsidian, but later kills Harlan and turns his body in to the Sparrows after learning Harlan was responsible for her mother's death and the ceasing of Claire's existence. She blames Viktor for this and it is revealed she has lost the need to say "I heard a rumor" when using her power in moments of intense anger and distress. Later at the hotel, she makes a deal with Reginald to rewrite the universe, but comes to regret it after realizing that Reginald would double-cross her. When the siblings step on the stars at Hotel Oblivion and begin to have their powers drained (in a process that would kill them), Allison kills Reginald and presses the button herself. This resets the universe and she finds herself returning to L.A., where she successfully reunites with Claire and Raymond, the latter of whom is mysteriously alive and raising Claire with Allison.

=== Klaus Hargreeves ===
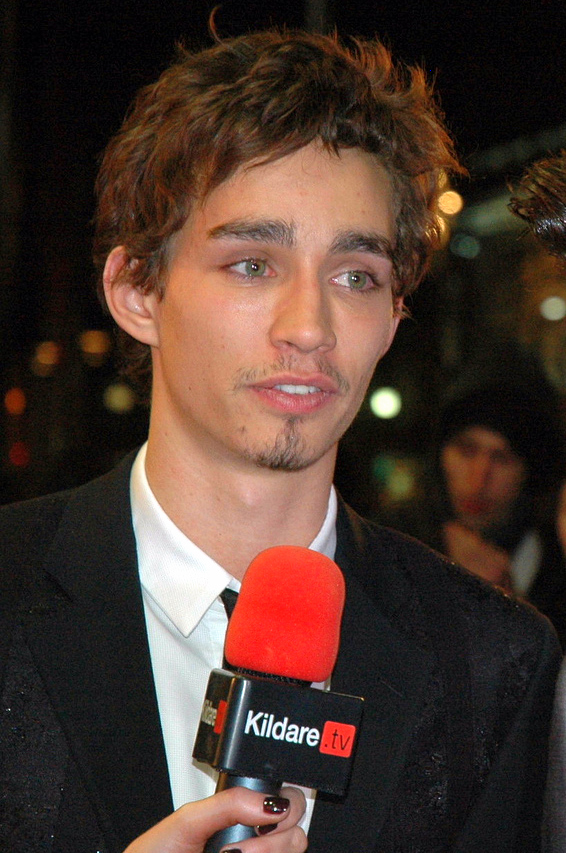
Klaus is portrayed by Robert Sheehan in the television adaptation.

Klaus Hargreeves
- The Umbrella Academy character
- First appearance: Comics: The Umbrella Academy: Apocalypse Suite (2007); Television: We Only See Each Other at Weddings and Funerals (episode 1.01; 2019)
- Created by: Gerard Way (creator); Gabriel Bá (illustrator)
- Adapted by: Steve Blackman
- Portrayed by: Robert Sheehan; Dante Albidone (young)

In-universe information
- Aliases: The Seance; Number Four; The Prophet (TV adaptation)
- Affiliation: The Umbrella Academy
- Significant other: Dave Katz (ex-lover)
- Relatives: Rachel Herschberger (biological mother); Luther Hargreeves (adoptive brother); Diego Hargreeves (adoptive sister); Allison Hargreeves (adoptive sister); Five Hargreeves (adoptive brother); Ben Hargreeves (adoptive brother; original timeline); Viktor Hargreeves (adoptive brother)
- Origin: Pennsylvania
- Nationality: American
- Abilities: Mediumship; Evocation; Immortality; Telekinesis (comics)
- Military Rank: Private 2nd Class
- Military Unit: 173rd Airborne Brigade Combat Team
- Military Employment: A Sầu Valley, Vietnam War

Klaus Hargreeves, also known as Number Four or by his superhero alter-ego The Séance, is the fourth member of the Umbrella Academy. Klaus's powers are speaking with the dead, channeling the dead so they speak through him, possessing people, broadcasting his consciousness through airwaves (allowing him to communicate through TVs), and telekinesis. In the television adaptation, he also has the power of evocation, making spirits corporeal, capable of being seen by others and interacting with objects around them, and the ability to resurrect himself from death. In the television adaptation, he retains only the ability to channel and the ability to speak to the dead, although he does not require a Ouija board to do so.

In the comic book Dallas, Klaus is seen holding a Vietnamese baby, which he later reveals to be his, to the surprise of Luther. Handing it to an elderly woman before leaving in the elevator, he thanks her in Vietnamese for taking care of the baby, to which she responds, also in Vietnamese, "Where you are going is no place for kids. The baby is safer here."

After returning to the present in the comics, Klaus abandoned his family and began working with the Mothers of Agony, a local satanic biker gang who gave him a variety of drugs and utilized his power to speak with the dead to con wealthy buyers. He later betrayed this group, leading them into a shootout with a rich widow desperate to find her husband's buried fortune. After locating both the hidden money as well as the biker's stash of heroin, Klaus returned to the city, only to overdose in an abandoned house. He was saved by the manifested spirit of his long-dead brother, Ben, who delivered him to a nearby hospital, and warned him of a new threat looming.

He is portrayed by Robert Sheehan and Dante Albidone, as an adult and teenager, respectively, in the television adaptation. He has the words "Hello" and "Goodbye" tattooed on his right and left palms, respectively. It has been theorized by Mr. Pogo that Klaus has been doing drugs since he was a teenager. Klaus continues to communicate with his deceased brother Ben. Refinery29 highlighted that "Ben, from the beyond, tries to keep Klaus on a straight and narrow path, and off of drugs, as best he can. Ben acts as sort of a north star for Klaus, often times pointing him in the right direction when needed". In an added detail absent from the comics, Klaus is depicted as pansexual in the television adaptation.

After Klaus is kidnapped by assassins Hazel and Cha-Cha, he manages to escape with a time-traveling briefcase. Opening it causes him to land in 1968 Vietnam, where he spends 10 months fighting in the Vietnam War. During this time, he falls in love with Dave, a fellow soldier, and becomes sober. However, Dave dies in battle before Klaus returns to the present, and Klaus spends the rest of the season staying sober in an attempt to contact Dave and expand his own powers.

In the second season, Klaus maintains his sobriety and starts a cult, the latter of which Ben opposes. In 1963, Klaus attempts to convince Dave not to enlist, but this only pushes Dave to enlist earlier than he had previously. This leads Klaus to relapse into his old habits, specifically alcoholism. He also discovers that Ben can now possess him. He is one of the siblings who attempts to save Viktor from the FBI building after learning of the apocalyptic consequences it would cause, but is knocked out by the sound waves. When he awakens, he learns that the apocalypse has been stopped, but that Ben sacrificed himself as a result.

The third season sees Klaus wanting to learn more about his family, so he goes on a road trip with Five to Pennsylvania to meet Klaus’ biological mother, an Amish farmer named Rachel Herschberger. However, Klaus learns that she and several of the original 43 mothers died before their children were born, resulting in a grandfather paradox that creates a Kugelblitz.

=== Number Five ===
Number Five
- The Umbrella Academy character
- First appearance: Comics: The Umbrella Academy: Apocalypse Suite (2007); Television: We Only See Each Other at Weddings and Funerals (episode 1.01; 2019)
- Created by: Gerard Way (creator); Gabriel Bá (illustrator)
- Adapted by: Steve Blackman
- Portrayed by: Aidan Gallagher; Jim Watson (adult); Sean Sullivan (old)

In-universe information
- Alias: The Boy
- Occupation: Assassin
- Affiliation: The Umbrella Academy
- Relatives: Luther Hargreeves (adoptive brother); Diego Hargreeves (adoptive sister); Allison Hargreeves (adoptive sister); Klaus Hargreeves (adoptive brother); Ben Hargreeves (adoptive brother; original timeline); Viktor Hargreeves (adoptive brother)
- Origin: Ireland
- Nationality: American
- Abilities: Space-time manipulation Teleportation; Time travel

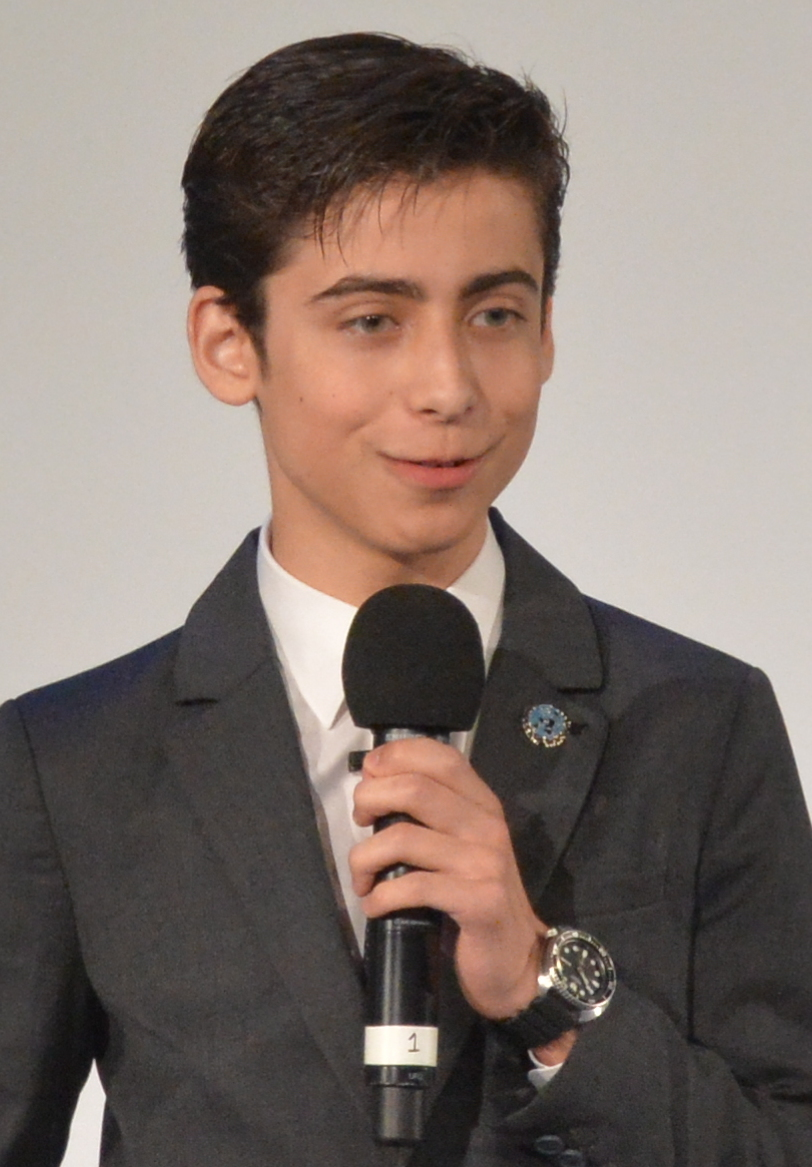
Five is portrayed by Aidan Gallagher in the series adaptation.

The unnamed fifth member of the Umbrella Academy is known only by his given number, Number Five, and by his superhero alter-ego The Boy. Number Five had a name but it was unspoken for so long that all of his siblings, and Five himself, forgot what it was. At the age of 10 (or 13 in the television adaptation), Five disappeared by using his power of time travel to escape into the future. Sir Reginald always warned him that he "could never go back"; it took him 45 years to figure out how to go back in time. He aged normally during his time in the apocalypse, but upon returning to the past he regained the appearance he had the day he traveled forwards. His body is stuck in time and cannot age, as medical examinations prove that there are no signs of cell growth or death. Five claims to have read accounts of the academy's immediate future and their connection to an apocalypse. While trying to go back in time to warn his adoptive brothers and sisters about the apocalypse, he worked with the Temps Aeternalis. He was taught to perform "micro jumps" in time, allowing him to move faster than the eye can see. He is considered "the perfect assassin," as he has had the DNA of the best killers in history infused into him. He has a 100% chance of killing if he decides to kill. It is revealed in the Dallas storyline that Five and Spaceboy are twin brothers. He also has a puppy named Mr. Pennycrumb. Number Five first appeared in The Umbrella Academy: The Apocalypse Suite #2, following a brief appearance on the final page of the previous issue.

In the television series, the character is portrayed by Aidan Gallagher and appears in all four seasons. Jim Watson plays an adult Five and Sean Sullivan portrays an elderly Five. Unlike the comics, his body continues to age normally after reverting to its 13-year-old form, as Five bemoans "going through puberty twice." He is constantly pursued by assassins Hazel and Cha-Cha, along with his former boss The Handler, all of whom work for the Temps Commission and want to make sure the apocalypse goes through. He returns to a job at the Commission in exchange for the safety of his family, but later double-crosses them after getting the information that Leonard Peabody is actually Harold Jenkins. He later time travels with his entire family in an attempt to start over at crossing the apocalypse.

However, the time travel goes awry and the siblings are scattered across different times in the 1960s. Five lands in an alternate timeline where the world is on the brink of being destroyed from a nuclear war. He is then saved by Hazel and travels back 10 days where he is warned the world will end once more. He meets with Diego and his new girlfriend Lila but quickly expresses a distrust for Lila. He soon discovers that Lila is in fact a member of the Commission, The Handler's adoptive daughter, and confronts the two of them at a warehouse. He later accepts a deal from The Handler to assassinate the board of directors in exchange for a time-travel briefcase, but this fails after Handler intentionally sets his family up. He meets with an older version of himself and experiences paradox psychosis, but also fails to retrieve a briefcase. At the Cooper farm, he and the rest of the siblings are confronted by Lila, The Handler, and the Commission, where it's revealed that Five assassinated Lila's parents in 1993 on orders from The Handler herself. The Handler guns down the Hargreeves (and Lila after she turns on her) and gravely wounds Five, but Five uses advice given to him earlier in the season by Reginald to reverse time and hold The Handler at gunpoint, after which she is gunned down herself.

In season three, believing the threat of the apocalypse is no more, Five officially decides to retire and enjoy life. He goes on a road trip with Klaus but later discovers that a grandfather paradox in which the siblings do not exist has created a Kugelblitz, which will swallow all of time and space. He begrudgingly teams up with Lila to travel to the now-destroyed Commission, where he discovers that a future version of himself is actually the Founder. After being told not to save the world by his counterpart, he gives up on saving the world and decides to accept his fate. He refuses to listen to Reginald when he proposes an idea to go into Hotel Oblivion, though he is forced to go in nonetheless. During a fight with the Guardian of the Hotel, Five loses his left arm, matching his future self. However, his arm is restored after the universe is reset and he loses his powers, suggesting that the Five that founds the Commission is from an alternate timeline.

In the television adaptation, Five's primary power is teleportation in addition to time travel, and he does not have to be taught "micro-jumps". For the effects of Number Five jumping through time and space in the series, Burrell wanted to make the effects look organic, and liquidy, representing how much time and the world bends around him when he jumps, and how quick it should be. For these effects, he used more than 30 frames in the first episodes, however with the progress of the series, this reduced to only 10 frames. To that footage, the team iterated on several kinds of spatial jump effects, all the way from heavy distortion to subtler images. The visual effects team started with some R&D tests. At the end, the final effect, called the "jelly vision", was used to make the series, with Burrell expressing: "as if you're pushing your hand through a jelly membrane, just for a few seconds, and then it pops. It's really, really subtle, but you get a little bit of texture, you get a little bit of striations, almost like the universe is bending as he does his spatial jumps."

=== Ben Hargreeves ===
Ben Hargreeves
- The Umbrella Academy character
- First appearance: Comics: The Umbrella Academy: Apocalypse Suite (2007); Television: We Only See Each Other at Weddings and Funerals (episode 1.01; 2019)
- Created by: Gerard Way (creator); Gabriel Bá (illustrator)
- Adapted by: Steve Blackman
- Portrayed by: Justin H. Min; Ethan Hwang (young)

In-universe information
- Aliases: The Horror; Number Six; Number Two (alternate timeline; TV series)
- Affiliation: The Umbrella Academy; The Sparrow Academy (alternate timeline; TV series)
- Relatives: Luther Hargreeves (adoptive brother); Diego Hargreeves (adoptive sister); Allison Hargreeves (adoptive sister); Klaus Hargreeves (adoptive brother); Five Hargreeves (adoptive brother); Viktor Hargreeves (adoptive brother); Alternate timeline; TV series: Marcus Hargreeves (adoptive brother); Fei Hargreeves (adoptive sister); Alphonso Hargreeves (adoptive brother); Sloane Hargreeves (adoptive sister); Jayme Hargreeves (adoptive sister); Christopher Hargreeves (adoptive brother)
- Origin: Seoul, South Korea
- Nationality: American
- Abilities: Eldritch tentacles

Ben Hargreeves, also known as Number Six or by his superhero alter-ego The Horror, is the currently deceased sixth member of the Umbrella Academy. Number Six possesses eldritch monsters from other dimensions under his skin (most often appearing as tentacles emerging from his torso). He is deceased from the results of a mission gone wrong.

Ben's spirit manifests during the Hotel Oblivion storyline, appearing before his brother Klaus in the hospital after saving him from an overdose. It is shown that the portion of his chest that held the monster's tentacles is now an empty cavity, and it is hinted by Ben later in the issue that the monster had escaped from its dimension. It is also implied the Hotel Oblivion was not just made to be a supervillain prison, but a trap designed by Hargreeves to contain the beast, with the villains inside meant to be used as bait.

He is portrayed by Justin H. Min and Ethan Hwang, as an adult and a teenager, respectively, in the television adaptation. In the television adaptation, Ben is depicted as South Korean. There is a memorial statue of him located in front of the academy. Even though he has been dead since before the start of the series, he has been portrayed as a member of The Umbrella Academy, appearing as his statue counterpart, in visions, or with Klaus, through his ability to talk to the dead. He can connect with Klaus physically, lending him his ability for a moment. CBR referred to Ben as a "Jiminy Cricket" type of character as he "reminds Klaus of his moral responsibilities even if the troubled Number Four refuses to listen".

In the first season of the television adaptation, Klaus hides that he is communicating with the deceased Ben. However, during the concert hall battle, "Klaus is able to use his powers to get Ben to manifest in the real world, as basically a superpower ghost. Ben then uses his powers — a giant beast with tentacles coming out of his stomach — to take out the gunmen". This also reveals the ghost Ben to his siblings. In the second season climax, Ben is the only one who can reach Vanya's subconscious when her power is out of control. Vulture highlighted that "as Vanya relives the horrors of the past, Ben gets through to her — not by imprisoning her, as his siblings once did, but by reassuring her that all those horrible things weren't her fault. [...] It's enough to get through to Vanya, but it comes with a cost: The effort Ben had to expend to reach Vanya means that, 17 years after his 'death,' it's time for Ben to die for real".

In the last episode of the season, and the third season thereafter, a version of Ben from an alternate timeline is introduced where this Ben is a member of the Sparrow Academy. He is known as Number Two and has the same powers. However, unlike his Umbrella counterpart, this Ben is much more confident and has better control over his powers. He tends to be rude and cocky, though this is a cover for his insecurities and his fear of being left alone. In an interview with Entertainment Weekly, Min said of the steps he took to transform into a different version of Ben, "To be honest, it was exhausting. I got to work with a voice coach while I was filming to slightly lower my register, as well as learn how to project more. And they wanted me to physically embody the character, so I had to go to the gym for the first time in many years. Having those external factors in place in terms of body and voice really helped me to inhabit the character in a real and convincing way."

He used to be Number One of the Sparrow Academy, though following a mission gone wrong dubbed the "Jennifer incident" (the same that killed Ben in the original timeline), he was demoted to Number Two and replaced with Marcus. He is revealed to secretly regret this and has secret drawings of Jennifer in his room, leading to speculation that the two were in love. He is initially hesitant to team up with the Umbrella Academy, though he later warms up to the idea after making a deal with Reginald to regain his Number One spot following Marcus' disappearance. Throughout the season, he is very closed off and hates the idea of the Sparrows not saving the world, even calling Sloane out when she decides to marry Luther and accept her fate in the apocalypse. When she asks why it's important for him to be a Sparrow, he initially does not respond, though later whispers under his breath, "Because I have nothing else."

=== Vanya Hargreeves (comic) / Viktor Hargreeves (TV) ===
Vanya Hargreeves (comics)/Viktor Hargreeves (TV)
- The Umbrella Academy character
- First appearance: Comics: The Umbrella Academy: Apocalypse Suite (2007); Television: We Only See Each Other at Weddings and Funerals (episode 1.01; 2019)
- Created by: Gerard Way (creator); Gabriel Bá (illustrator)
- Adapted by: Steve Blackman
- Portrayed by: Elliot Page; TJ McGibbon (teenager); Alyssa Gervasi (4-year-old)

In-universe information
- Aliases: White Violin; Number Seven
- Occupation: Violin instructor
- Affiliation: The Umbrella Academy
- Relatives: Luther Hargreeves (adoptive brother); Diego Hargreeves (adoptive sister); Allison Hargreeves (adoptive sister); Klaus Hargreeves (adoptive brother); Five Hargreeves (adoptive brother); Ben Hargreeves (adoptive brother; original timeline)
- Origin: Russia
- Nationality: American
- Abilities: Sound manipulation Sound absorption Sound reflection Energy manipulation Force field projection Telekenisis; Transmutation; Flight; Weather manipulation Power transfer

Vanya Hargreeves—later Viktor Hargreeves in the television adaptation—is the seventh member of the Umbrella Academy; they are also known as Number Seven or by their superhero alter ego The White Violin. In the television adaptation, the character is portrayed by Elliot Page as an adult, and by T. J. McGibbon and Alyssa Gervasi as a teenager and a 4-year-old, respectively.

The most estranged member of the umbrella group, Vanya originally showcases no particular powers other than an interest in music. Vanya is known to have written a book detailing her life with the academy and her decision to leave. According to The Conductor, leader of the Orchestra Verdammten, Vanya is the most powerful member of The Umbrella Academy. In her early childhood, The Monocle suppressed her powers and kept her on medication to maintain this, but her powers were eventually released by The Conductor, driving Vanya mad. She is capable of releasing destructive waves of force using her violin that can be strong enough to cut someone's throat or destroy an entire building with a single note. After unlocking her powers, she murders the Conductor and travels to the Hargreeves mansion to destroy it, killing Pogo in the process. During the fight with her siblings, Klaus distracts her by pretending to channel Hargreeves, and Number 5 shoots her in the back of the head with Hargreeves' revolver. Doctors said that she would eventually recover from her injuries, but would never play the violin again. The television adaptation differs – it is Allison who aims the gun at Vanya. At the last minute, she fires the gun next to Vanya's ear, causing her to lose focus and pass out, and leading the unconscious Vanya to blow up the moon, destroying all life on Earth.

During the Dallas comics storyline, Vanya is shown in the care of her siblings in the bunker beneath the mansion's ruins, partially amnesic and using a wheelchair. She was subject to some abuse by Allison in retaliation for slicing her throat, left bound in front of screens depicting the aftermath of her rampage. At the end of the storyline, Allison has a change of heart and helps her sister recover rather than punishing her. In season 2 of the adaptation, Vanya suffers from amnesia after getting hit by a car upon arrival in 1963 and becomes a live-in nanny for Sissy's autistic son Harlan. When Harlan goes missing, Vanya "uses powers to discover that Harlan actually drowned in a lake and is able to resuscitate him by unknowingly transferring some of her power to him". After this, Vanya enters a romantic lesbian relationship with Sissy which is kept secret from Sissy's husband. Later in the season, Vanya's memories return via electroshock torture. Vanya returns to the present with the family while Sissy chooses to remain in her time. CBR highlighted that comics "Dallas didn't dive deep into Vanya apart from her and Mother trying to fix her memory after her attack as the White Violin" while the second season's "entire LGBT relationship and arc of xenophobia is new, as well as [Viktor] being a bomb the FBI triggers".

By the Hotel Oblivion storyline in the comics, Vanya has undertaken physical therapy with Allison coaching her. She feels doubtful about her recovery, though, and brushes off Allison's attempts to support her, possibly out of guilt. Eventually, Mother takes Vanya from the bunker in secret, revealing that there was more to the academy than Hargreeves realized, and introducing her to another team of superpowered siblings seemingly under her leadership.

"It's, uh, Viktor," Viktor replies nervously.

"Who's Viktor?" says a confused Diego.

"I am," says Viktor, now more confident in himself. "It's who I've always been. Uh, is that an issue for anyone?"

The trio of siblings thinks on this for a half-second, then quickly accepts the news and moves back to arguing about what to do regarding the Sparrows.

— Rolling Stone scene recap from the episode "World's Biggest Ball of Twine"

In March 2022, it was announced that Page would return in the upcoming third season as Viktor Hargreeves; the character transitions during the third season. Gizmodo reported that "the change comes in the wake of Page's own announcement of their transgender identity, and was very likely done to reflect Page's own transition". Alan Sepinwall, in a review for Rolling Stone, wrote that "there probably was an operatic and/or science-fiction route the series could have taken to this moment, but it would have required a far more delicate touch than Umbrella Academy typically possesses. By quickly presenting Viktor's transition as a fact of life, allowing him a brief moment to describe his feelings, and then getting back to silly business as usual, the show takes its star's transition seriously without getting in the way of its usual narrative or tonal choices". Daniel D'Addario, for Variety, highlighted the "seamless" nature of Viktor's transition and announcement to his family. D'Addario commented that "at a time when an ongoing backlash against the rights of trans people simply to exist is rolling across this country, a show depicting the coming-out process as a declaration of self that is possible and that can be met with kindness feels like a worthy thing to put out into the world, if given the opportunity. [...] (Praise for this series' approach to Viktor should go to the team behind it and not to Netflix's leadership, which has made abundantly clear that they'll air whatever.) [...] In addressing this issue, allowing Viktor and Page to move forward, meeting both where they were and allowing them to remain on the team, The Umbrella Academy did a small, good thing at a time when it might be easier not to".

== Antagonists ==
=== The Conductor ===
The Conductor is a villain in The Umbrella Academy: Apocalypse Suite who relentlessly pursued Vanya Hargreeves in the hopes of recruiting her to his orchestra for the purpose of ending the world with a song he had written. The Conductor had found the truth about Vanya's powers and brainwashed her into realising them. After turning down the Conductor's offers many times, Vanya later agreed to play his song to bring on the apocalypse. While Vanya is playing the song with the orchestra, she kills the Conductor and the rest of the orchestra shortly before using her powers to bring on the apocalypse. Vanya's powers devastate the moon sending chunks of it flying back to Earth. However, shortly after this, her brother Klaus managed to utilize his telekinesis to support the largest piece of the moon, preventing numerous deaths and averting the future visited by Number Five.

The Conductor appears in a recurring role in the first season of the television series, in which he is portrayed by Peter Outerbridge. In the adaptation, the Conductor has no villainous motive. Instead, the character's motives are more closely embodied by Leonard Peabody.

=== Dr. Terminal ===
Dr. Terminal is a villain in The Umbrella Academy: Apocalypse Suite and The Umbrella Academy: Hotel Oblivion. In the past, Terminal was diagnosed with Eisenstein Syndrome, a rare disease that eats a person from the nervous system to the brain. He was given two months to live by doctors, so he created a device that can convert matter into energy that will feed the disease and keep him alive. He then returned to his doctor's office and devoured the doctors with his device. He was incarcerated and escaped by absorbing a reporter, the cell bars, all the guards, the prison warden, and the carnations near the front gate. He later kidnapped The Rumor and devoured her left arm before being defeated by Spaceboy. He battled the Umbrella Academy time and time again until he was sent to the Hotel Oblivion by The Monocle. He vowed to return and destroy the world. He also left behind the Terminauts to destroy the Umbrella Academy should they ever reform.

Dr. Terminal is briefly mentioned in the television series adaptation.

=== Hazel and Cha-Cha ===
A pair of extremely violent assassins working for the Temps Aeternalis are named Hazel and Cha-Cha. Many in the agency, including Number Five, consider them the most dangerous team in the history of the agency, mainly for their unpredictable methods. They both wear brightly colored cartoon character masks, exhibit maniacal and psychopathic behavior, and have a love of murder and sugary snacks. After the initial failure of the first team to recapture or neutralize Number Five for defecting, they were called in to take him down. To that end, they managed to capture his brother, The Séance, torturing and eventually killing him, as well as acquiring Sir Hargreeves' secret stockpile of nuclear weapons. They die near the end of the Dallas story line when The Séance, after returning from the dead, possesses Cha-Cha, kills Hazel, and then himself (as Cha-Cha).

Hazel and Cha-Cha are portrayed by Cameron Britton and Mary J. Blige, respectively, in the television series. Hazel appears in a main role in the first season and a guest role in the second. He falls in love with a doughnut-store owner named Agnes Rofa and quits the commission. Before the world ends, he time travels to the past to be with Agnes. He appears in the guest role in season 2, where he is killed by Alex, Otto, and Oscar after warning Five of the upcoming apocalypse. Cha-Cha, on the other hand, appears only in the first season and remains loyal to the commission and dies along with everyone else in the apocalypse. These variations have several major differences from their comic portrayals. While their appearances are very similar, Cha-Cha is now female, and less unpredictable. The characters are less comedic than their comic portrayals, appearing as strategic assassins, though Hazel exhibits a love of sugary foods similar to his comics variation. Cha-Cha also exhibits a profound obsession with the history of previous assassins in the Temps organization, as seen in the second episode when Hazel and Cha-Cha torture a suspect and Cha-Cha compliments his rap sheet.

=== A. J. Carmichael ===
Atlas Jericho "A. J." Carmichael is a talking goldfish who inhabits a tank atop a human bodysuit. He is the chief authority in charge of the Temps Aeternalis. Carmichael headed the Temps Aeternalis at the time Number Five was inducted into the organization. He oversaw his training as an assassin and his DNA being bonded to that of the most notorious assassins from across history. In The Umbrella Academy: Dallas, Carmichael blackmails Number Five and The Rumor to prevent Five's past self from stopping the assassination of President John F. Kennedy in 1963. Unknown to them, the assassination had to be ensured so that Kennedy would never meet Sir Reginald Hargreeves and hand over nuclear missiles to him. These missiles would be detonated by Hazel and Cha-Cha and destroy the world in the Temps Aeternalis's own attempt to apprehend Number Five. Carmichael explained the scope of their mission's success after President Kennedy had been assassinated and the Umbrella Academy were returned to the present. Number Five then attacked and killed Carmichael out of revenge for what he had done to him, eating the goldfish alive.

A. J. is voiced by an uncredited Robin Atkin Downes in the television series and appears in the second season in a recurring role.

== Other characters ==
=== Phinneus Pogo ===
Dr. Phinneus Pogo is a talking male chimpanzee associated with The Monocle. When growing up at the academy, Spaceboy considered Mr Pogo to be his best friend. He watched most of the academy grow up and knew all of the children very well. He was also a sympathizer of Vanya's plight when she was repeatedly told by Sir Reginald that she was not special, as she had no special powers. Despite this, he was murdered by Vanya after her transformation into the White Violin as a test of her power against the academy.

During the third season, an alternate version of Pogo had a falling out with The Monocle and had gotten a job as a tattoo artist while The Monocle formed the Sparrow Academy. When Five sought him out, Pogo told him about the tattoo that is connected to Project Oblivion.

Burrell called Weta Digital, who previously worked for the rebooted Planet of the Apes series, to develop the visual effects for the character of Pogo in the television series. Ken Hall provided the motion capture for Pogo using a gray suit to later make additions to his captures to create the CGI of the chimpanzee, with Adam Godley making the facial expressions and voice acting of the character.

=== Abhijat ===
Abhijat is Reginald's bodyguard and assistant. He also serves as the pilot of the Minerva. After the family had drifted apart again following Dallas, Abhijat flew the Minerva to Japan, assisting Dr. Zoo, a former associate of Hargreeves, with using the Minerva to explore the mysterious depths of the Afterzone.

This character is absent in the television adaptation of the series.

=== Perseus X ===
John Perseus X is the young, spoiled heir to the Perseus Corporation. He returns to buy out all outstanding shares of the company, and name himself CEO and chairman of the board, and immediately orders a drastic change in focus of the company, planning to create his own Televator to break his father out of the Hotel Oblivion, Hargreeves' interdimensional prison for supervillains. He eventually manages to break in with the help of Hotel escapee Obscuro, only to find his father dead, with his talking atomic robot head, Medusa still active. Medusa convinces Perseus to lead a mass jailbreak of all the supervillains from the hotel, who causes a reign of terror on the city that Medusa convinces Perseus X to fight and be thought of as the city's new true hero. Perseus however, soon realizes Medusa is as dangerous as the other villains, and actually influences his father to commit suicide, finally lopping off the hand Medusa has attached itself to and allowing Spaceboy to throw it at a massive Dr. Terminal, who is gorging on the city, which ultimately destroys Medusa and Terminal.

Perseus X is absent from the television adaptation of the series.

=== Grace Hargreeves ===
Grace Hargreeves is a robot designed to be the Umbrella Academy's mother. She later malfunctions and "dies" after getting a pot of coffee spilled in her by Number Five. The members of the Umbrella Academy try to fix her but in the end they find her machinery to be much too complicated.

In the television adaptation, Grace is portrayed by Jordan Claire Robbins. She emotionally cares for the children, even when they return as adults after Reginald's death. Diego deactivates her out of mercy as she had been malfunctioning badly. However, Pogo reactivates her shortly after, but she is destroyed permanently during the destruction of the academy. In the second season, a human version of Grace appears in 1963 as Reginald's love interest, implying that the robot was based on her. In season three, the robot Grace is the Sparrow Academy's maid in the alternate timeline and comes to worship the kugelblitz as her god. When Grace attacks the two teams, Five snaps her neck which deactivates Grace for good.

=== St. Zero ===
Saint Zero was a world-renowned astronaut and space explorer. Spaceboy's childhood hero, he flew eight successful missions in total aboard his ship the Valeur before disappearing while on a mission to Mars. In fact, Saint Zero survived, but was hurtled into afterspace and rendered catatonic.

Saint Zero is absent from the television adaptation of the series.

=== Dr. Zoo ===
Dr. Zoo is a doctor associated with Reginald. He is depicted as a quirky and eccentric scientist, known for his advanced technological creations. Among his notable inventions is The Minerva, an interstellar ship originally designed by Hargreeves. In Hotel Oblivion, Dr. Zoo utilizes The Minerva to explore a mysterious region of the universe known as the “After Zone” . He is absent from the television adaptation of the series.

=== The Sparrows ===
The Sparrows are a group made up of seven powered individuals. They are heavily implied to be among the 43 children born simultaneously to mothers with no previous signs of pregnancy on October 1, 1989. First introduced in Hotel Oblivion, their origins are likely to be explored in the next installment of the comic book series.

They are significantly different in the television adaptation, where in an altered future of the 1963 just changed by the Umbrella Academy members; they are a group of superheroes adopted by Reginald, similar to the Umbrella Academy, and Ben is revealed to be a member of the Sparrows. Their names are Marcus (Number One), Ben (Number Two), Fei (Number Three), Alphonso (Number Four), Sloane (Number Five), Jayme (Number Six), and Christopher (Number Seven).

==== Marcus Hargreeves / Sparrow Number One ====
Marcus is portrayed by Justin Cornwell in the television adaptation. He has increased strength and agility.

==== Ben Hargreeves / Sparrow Number Two ====
An alternative timeline version of Ben, portrayed by Justin H. Min in the television adaptation. He has the same power as the Umbrella timeline Ben.

==== Fei Hargreeves / Sparrow Number Three ====
Fei is portrayed by Britne Oldford in the television adaptation. She is blind and has the ability to create ravens under her control that act as her eyes. Oldford is a main cast member for the third season.

==== Alphonso Hargreeves / Sparrow Number Four ====
Alphonso is portrayed by Jake Epstein in the television adaptation. He has the ability to absorb physical attacks and inflict the damage back to his opponents.

==== Sloane Hargreeves / Sparrow Number Five ====
Sloane is portrayed by Genesis Rodriguez in the television adaptation. She has the ability to manipulate gravity and has taken a mutual interest in Luther. Rodriguez is a main cast member for the third season.

==== Jayme Hargreeves / Sparrow Number Six ====
Jayme is portrayed by Cazzie David in the television adaptation. She has the ability to spit a hallucinogenic venom that incapacitates her opponents.

==== Christopher Hargreeves / Sparrow Number Seven ====
A sentient cube with telekinetic abilities. Christopher also appears in the television adaptation.

== Television characters ==
The following characters are exclusive to the TV series:

=== The Handler ===
The Handler is an exclusive character to the television series. She is portrayed by Kate Walsh and appears in a recurring role in the first season before being promoted to the main cast for the next. The Handler was a high-ranking member and major influencer of the Temps Commission. She was frequently seen dealing personally with matters concerning Number Five and the apocalypse, despite not being the case leader. The Handler had a clear agenda in her belief that time should not be changed, going to extreme lengths to maintain the timeline and ensure nothing is changed. She is also the adoptive mother of Lila Pitts, having assassinated the girl's biological parents to take Lila for herself. She takes over the Commission after she has Five assassinate the Board of Directors. The Handler is almost killed at the end of season one after being shot in the head by Hazel, and is actually killed by the Swede at the end of the second season.

=== Leonard Peabody ===
Leonard Peabody, also known as Harold Jenkins, is an exclusive character to the television series based on the Conductor. He is portrayed by John Magaro as an adult, while Jesse Noah Gruman portrays a younger Harold. As a child, he was an admirer of the Umbrella Academy and begged to join, since he was born on the same day as the result of a normal pregnancy, but was rejected and humiliated by Reginald. He later discovers Reginald's diary, detailing Vanya's potential, and inserts himself into her life with the goal of manipulating her into discovering her powers and using them against her siblings. After hiring thugs to rough him up in front of Vanya, he loses an eye and the prosthetic eyeball that Five found in the future is revealed to be his after his death. He is killed by Vanya after she discovers his secret.

=== Lila Pitts ===
Lila Pitts is a character exclusive to the television adaptation; she is portrayed by Ritu Arya, while Riya Korah and Anjana Vernuganan portray a teenaged and four-year old version of the character in flashbacks. Lila is introduced as a fellow patient at the mental institution Diego is committed to in 1963. After she and Diego escape the institution, Lila tags along to help Diego stop the apocalypse. However, Five, who does not trust Lila, discovers she is The Handler's daughter, and that in 1993, The Handler had Five execute Lila's parents so she could take Lila for herself and raise her. She is one of the 43 children born on October 1, 1989, and has the ability to mirror anyone's powers.

=== Raymond Chestnut ===
Raymond Chestnut, portrayed by Yusuf Gatewood, is Allison's second husband in the early 1960s. Raymond is an African-American man fighting for civil rights and appears in a main role in the second season of the series. In the reset universe at the end of season three, he is Allison's husband in 2019 and raising her daughter Claire with her.

=== Sissy Cooper ===
Sissy Cooper, portrayed by Marin Ireland, is Vanya's friend and love interest. She is also Carl's wife and Harlan's mother. Sissy takes in Vanya after hitting the latter with her car and causing amnesia. She soon begins an affair with Vanya. Sissy appears in the second season of the series in a main role. In season three, it is revealed that Sissy died of cancer on October 1, 1989, the same day as the Umbrella and Sparrow Academy children were born. Harlan's grief over his mother's death caused a psychic shockwave that killed the parents of the Umbrella Academy children, creating the Sparrow Academy timeline.

=== Recurring characters ===
==== Introduced in season 1 ====
- Sheila McCarthy as Agnes Rofa (season 1), Hazel's nascent love interest, the waitress and baker at (and owner of) Griddy's Doughnuts. She leaves with Hazel, even though Cha-Cha is threatening her life. Agnes died from cancer sometime before the events of season two sometime in the 1950s or 60s.
- Ashley Madekwe as Detective Eudora Patch (season 1), Diego's former romantic partner. Patch is killed by Cha-Cha after finding Klaus in the latter's Hotel room. Diego is the prime suspect for her murder due to being at the scene of the crime and having his fingerprints all over the body, however his name is cleared when Hazel gives Diego Cha-Cha's gun.
- Rainbow Sun Francks as Detective Chuck Beaman (season 1)
- Matt Biedel as Sgt. Dale Chedder (season 1)
- Cody Ray Thompson (season 1) as Dave, Klaus' boyfriend during the Vietnam war. Calem MacDonald portrays a younger Dave in the second season.
- Patrice Goodman as Dot (season 2; guest seasons 1 and 3), a case manager at the Commission who idolizes Number Five.
- Ken Hall as Herb (season 2; guest seasons 1 and 3), an analytics specialist at the Commission who idolizes Number Five.
- Millie Davis (season 4) and Coco Assad (guest seasons 1 and 3) as Claire, Allison's daughter.

==== Introduced in season 2 ====
- Kevin Rankin as Elliott (season 2), a man who assists Number Five, believing he is an alien from Area 51. He is murdered by Axel, Otto, and Oscar.
- Kris Holden-Ried as Axel (season 2), the leader of a trio of Swedish triplet assassins working for the Commission.
- John Kapelos as Jack Ruby (season 2), the owner of a nightclub that Luther is involved with and the future murderer of Lee Harvey Oswald.
- Stephen Bogaert as Carl Cooper (season 2), Sissy's husband and Harlan's father.
- Raven Dauda as Odessa (season 2), owner of a Black beauty salon in South Dallas who takes in Allison.
- Dewshane Williams as Miles (season 2), Raymond's friend and fellow civil rights activist.
- Jason Bryden as Otto (season 2), one of the triplet assassins. He is killed by Axel after Allison rumors him into doing so.
- Tom Sinclair as Oscar (season 2), one of the triplet assassins. He is killed in a trap set by the Handler under the guise of Diego.
- Justin Paul Kelly (season 2; guest season 3) and Callum Keith Rennie (season 3) as Harlan Cooper / Lester Pocket, Sissy and Carl's son with nonverbal autism who develops a friendship with Vanya. After Vanya saves him from drowning, Harlan gains Vanya's powers. Rennie portrays the present-day version of the character. In the present day, Harlan is now able to communicate verbally and inadvertently created the Sparrow Academy timeline when he accidentally killed the mothers of the Umbrella Academy in a fit of grief. He is killed by Allison in revenge after she learns the truth.
- Dov Tiefenbach as Keechie (season 2), a follower of Klaus's cult.
- Mouna Traoré as Jill (season 2), a member of Klaus's cult whom Ben is in love with.

==== Introduced in season 3 ====
- Javon "Wanna" Walton as Stanley "Stan" (season 3), Diego and Lila's supposed twelve-year-old son. It's later revealed that Stan is actually the son of a friend of Lila's from 1989 whose help she had enlisted to test if Diego would make a good father, when Lila tells Diego she is pregnant with his child. He is erased from existence by the Kugelblitz.
- Julian Richings as Chet Rodo (season 3), manager of the Hotel Obsidian.

==== Introduced in season 4 ====
- David Cross as Sy Grossman (season 4), a man who Abigail Hargreeves, Reginald's wife, killed and assumed the identity of
- Nick Offerman as Dr. Gene Thibedeau (season 4), Jean's husband and the co-creator of the Keepers
- Megan Mullally as Dr. Jean Thibedeau (season 4), Gene's wife and the co-creator of the Keepers
- Martin Roach as Lance Ribbons (season 4), a deputy director of the CIA
- Liisa Repo-Martell as Abigail Hargreeves (season 4; guest seasons 1 and 3), Sir Reginald's wife, who dies on their home planet. She is brought back to life in the third season.
- Victoria Sawal as Jennifer (season 4), a girl infected with durango who Ben forms a romantic attachment to.
