= Montreal English Theatre Awards =

Canadian theatre award ceremony

- Official logo
- Location: Montreal, Quebec
- Country: Canada
- Website: metas.ca

The Montreal English Theatre Awards (also known as the META awards) are one of the most prestigious awards in the Montreal English theatre industry. The formal awards ceremony takes place annually in Montreal, Quebec, Canada.

== History ==
The Montreal English Theatre Awards were created in 2012, with support from the Quebec Drama Federation, its founding partner. The META awards were created to recognize work in Montreal's English theatre industry and promote emerging theatre artists and companies in Montreal. The first META ceremony was held in Montreal, in 2013.

== Statuette ==
The current META awards statuette awarded to individuals of winning categories is a hollow and tall, matte black cylinder, with the letters META engraved on the front, with a red interior. This specific statuette is the one awarded to the winners of each category, since 2014. Previously, in 2013, the statuette awarded had the same overall appearance, excluding the black exterior, which was replaced with a false gold exterior.

== Categories ==
=== Annual Categories ===
- Outstanding Lead Performance – Actor
- Outstanding Lead Performance – Actress
- Outstanding Supporting Performance – Actor
- Outstanding Supporting Performance – Actress
- Outstanding Ensemble
- Outstanding Direction
- Outstanding Set Design
- Outstanding Costume Design
- Outstanding Lighting Design
- Outstanding Sound Design / Composition
- Outstanding Contribution to Theatre
- Outstanding Independent Production
- Outstanding PACT Production
- Outstanding Emerging Artist(s) – Performance
- Outstanding Emerging Artist(s) – Production
- Writing
- Outstanding New Text (Original or Adaptation)
- Outstanding New Translation
- Community
- Outstanding Community Production

=== Special awards ===
Special awards are decided exclusively to that year, by the META committee, highlighting the elements they feel deserve recognition.
