= Aidan Gallagher =

American actor, musician and activist (born 2003)

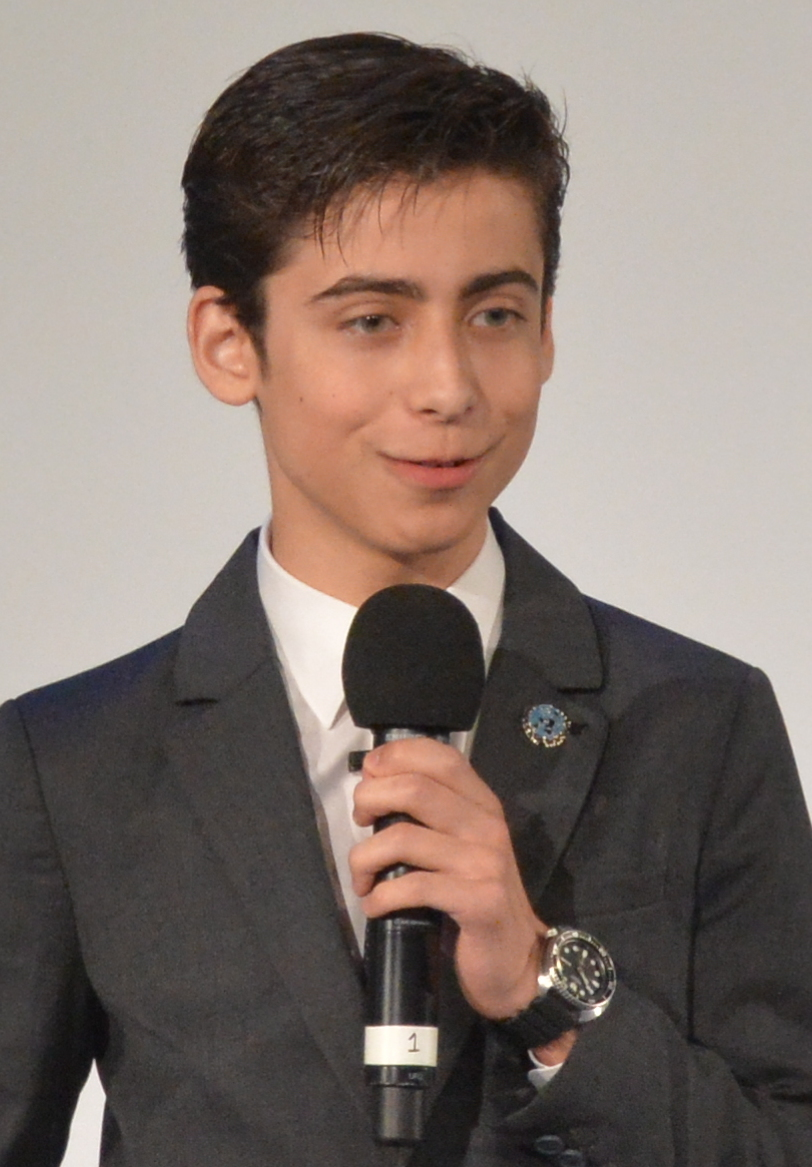
- Gallagher in 2018
- Born: September 18, 2003 (age 23)
- Occupations: Actor; musician
- Years active: 2013–present
- Musical career
- Genres: Pop; pop rock
- Instruments: Vocals; bass; guitar; keyboard
- Website: aidanrgallagher.com

Aidan Gallagher (born September 18, 2003) is an American actor and musician. His first major television role was Nicky Harper on the Nickelodeon sitcom Nicky, Ricky, Dicky & Dawn. In 2019, Gallagher began portraying Number Five on the Netflix superhero series The Umbrella Academy, which is his breakthrough role and has brought him widespread recognition and critical acclaim. In 2018, Gallagher was appointed as a UN Environment Goodwill Ambassador for North America, becoming one of the youngest people to hold the position.

== Career ==
=== Acting ===
Gallagher first appeared in a minor role in a 2013 episode of Modern Family. He was in the short film You & Me and was in the CBS television pilot Jacked Up, which was not picked up and never aired. He then landed a major role in Nickelodeon's Nicky, Ricky, Dicky & Dawn as Nicky Harper, for which he was nominated Favorite Male TV Star in the Nickelodeon Kids' Choice Awards in 2016 and 2017. He was in the show for four seasons until it ended in 2018.

In February 2019, Gallagher began starring in the Netflix superhero series The Umbrella Academy, an adaptation of the comic book series of the same name, as Number Five, a 58-year-old time traveler who is stuck inside the body of his 13-year-old self due to an accidental time jump. His portrayal won him critical praise; as The New York Times' reviewer put it, he "carries the show as far as he can". Daniel Fienberg of The Hollywood Reporter wrote that "Gallagher is very good in the tricky part of a fifty-something-year-old man trapped in the body of a schoolboy".

=== Music ===
In addition to his acting career, Gallagher is a singer, songwriter, and musician. He began releasing songs independently in 2018 starting with "Blue Neon" through his YouTube channel. The following year, he collaborated with The Voice contestant Trinity Rose on a duet track "Miss You". He released two more singles, "Time" and "For You" in that same year. On January 5, 2020, Gallagher embarked on his first headlining tour, the "Blue Neon Tour" and was scheduled to perform at South by Southwest, but was later cancelled due to the COVID-19 pandemic. Later that year, he released two singles: "I Love You" on March 20 and "4th of July" on July 4, the latter of which he started working on while filming the second season of The Umbrella Academy.

== Personal life ==
Gallagher is active on environmental issues, and has served as a youth advocate for a number of environmental organizations, including Waterkeeper Alliance, WildAid and Oceanic Preservation Society. In 2018, he was listed in Variety's Hollywood Youth Impact Report, and was appointed as a UN Environment Goodwill Ambassador for North America, one of the youngest ever UN Goodwill Ambassadors to be so-named. In the year 2021, he gave an interview for the fashion magazine Vanity Teen, reviewing his career and his social influence on youth.

Gallagher is vegan and Jewish.

== Filmography ==
=== Film ===
Year	Title	Role	Notes
2013	You & Me	Young David	Short film

=== Television ===
Year	Title	Role	Notes	Ref.
2013	Modern Family	Alec	Episode: "The Wow Factor"; uncredited	
2013	Jacked Up	Evan	Unsold pilot	
2014–2018	Nicky, Ricky, Dicky & Dawn	Nicky	Main cast	
2015	Nickelodeon's Ho Ho Holiday Special	Himself	TV movie	
2017	Nickelodeon's Sizzling Summer Camp Special	Beach Guy	TV movie; cameo	
2019–2024	The Umbrella Academy	Number Five	Main cast	

=== Music videos ===
Year	Title	Artist(s)	Role
2014	"We Make That Lemonade"	Nicky, Ricky, Dicky & Dawn cast	Nicky Harper

== Discography ==
Title	Year	Album
"Blue Neon (Club Version)"	2018	TBA 2026
"Miss You" (with Trinity Rose)	2019	TBA 2026
"Time"	2019	TBA 2026
"For You"	2019	TBA 2026
"I Love You"	2020	TBA 2026
"4th of July"	2020	TBA 2026
"Without You"	2026	TBA 2026
"Dream"	2026	TBA 2026

== Awards and nominations ==
Year	Award	Category	Work	Result	Ref.
2016	Young Artist Award	Outstanding Young Ensemble Cast in a Television Series	Nicky, Ricky, Dicky & Dawn (shared with Casey Simpson, Lizzy Greene & Mace Coronel)	Nominated	
2016	Kids' Choice Award	Favorite Male TV Star	Nicky, Ricky, Dicky & Dawn	Nominated	
2017	Kids' Choice Award	Favorite Male TV Star	Nicky, Ricky, Dicky & Dawn	Nominated	
