= The Umbrella Academy: Apocalypse Suite =

Comic book series by Gerard Way and Gabriel Bá

- Trade paperback cover. Art by Gabriel Bá.

Publication information
- Publisher: Dark Horse Comics
- Format: Limited series
- Genre: Superhero
- Publication date: September 19, 2007 – February 20, 2008
- No. of issues: 6
- Main character(s): Spaceboy; The Kraken; The Rumor; The Séance; Number Five; White Violin; Sir Reginald Hargreeves; Dr. Pogo; The Conductor

Creative team
- Created by: Gerard Way
- Written by: Gerard Way
- Artist(s): Gabriel Bá; James Jean (covers)
- Letterer(s): Jason Hvam (Internet preview only); Nate Piekos
- Colorist: Dave Stewart

Collected editions
- The Apocalypse Suite: ISBN 1-59307-978-8

The Umbrella Academy: Apocalypse Suite is the first comic book limited series of The Umbrella Academy, created and written by musician Gerard Way and illustrated by Gabriel Bá. The series ran for six issues from September 2007 to February 2008. James Jean provided cover art for this series only. A trade paperback was released on June 18, 2008.

== Plot ==
=== Issue #1: "The Day The Eiffel Tower Went Berserk" ===
The first issue, "The Day the Eiffel Tower Went Berserk", was released on September 19, 2007. The inside front cover features notes made by Sir Reginald Hargreeves on his seven adopted children, numbered by usefulness.

The Umbrella Academy, a group of seven superpowered children born to women that had shown no signs of pregnancy, are adopted by Sir Reginald Hargreeves, a space alien who poses as a wealthy inventor and who raises them as superheroes. At ten years old, the Umbrella Academy, consisting of Spaceboy/Luther (00.01), Kraken/Diego (00.02), Rumor/Allison (00.03), Séance/Klaus (00.04), and Horror/Ben (00.06), stop an attack on Paris resulting in the Eiffel tower taking off into space. 20 years later, the group has split up, and they all fail to stay in touch with each other after the disappearance of Five (00.05), who remained unnamed, and the death of Horror. Spaceboy, the former leader of the team and whose head has been transplanted onto the body of a Martian Gorilla, receives a phone call, finding out about the death of Sir Reginald Hargreeves. He returns to the academy to find his brother Five, who went missing 20 years before, still physically aged 10.

=== Issue #2: "We Only See Each Other At Weddings And Funerals" ===
The second issue, "We Only See Each Other At Weddings And Funerals", was released on October 17, 2007.

The next day, Spaceboy reunites with his adopted sister and childhood crush, Rumor, who has the power to alter reality with her lies. She reveals that she has recently divorced, and has a daughter. They then reunite with Séance, who is capable of communicating with the dead, and with Kraken, a rebel with the ability to hold his breath indefinitely. After Sir Reginald Hargreeves' funeral, they talk to Five, who reveals he figured out how to travel to the future when they were 10, where he got stuck and he found that the apocalypse had happened; he goes on to explain that he spent the next 50 years trying to return to warn the rest. He states that the end of the world began three days after Sir Reginald Hargreeves' death. In the city, the now estranged Vanya (00.07), having never shown any ability beyond the violin, goes to the Icarus Theater. There she is offered a position in the Orchestra Verdammten, a group of musicians claiming they can destroy the world by playing the "Apocalypse Suite;" Vanya, however, refuses to join.

=== Issue #3: "Dr. Terminal's Answer" ===
The third issue, "Dr. Terminal's Answer", was released on November 21, 2007.

The Umbrella Academy fights the Terminauts, a group of destructive robots programmed by the academy's former nemesis, Dr. Terminal. Vanya intervenes in the fight only to be saved by Kraken, and it is revealed that he holds a grudge against her for leaving the academy years ago. A resentful Vanya returns to the Icarus Theater and joins the Orchestra Verdammten.

=== Issue #4: "Baby, I'll Be Your Frankenstein" ===
The fourth issue, "Baby, I'll Be Your Frankenstein", was released on December 19, 2007.

Unexpectedly, Vanya is revealed to be in fact the most powerful of all her siblings and the conductor of the Orchestra experiments with her to unleash her power. Five and Dr. Pogo go to a café where they are ambushed by a mysterious group of masked men carrying laser guns. Five easily kills them afterwards. Vanya dubs herself "The White Violin" and proclaims the end of the Umbrella Academy and then the world.

=== Issue #5: "Thank You For The Coffee" ===
The fifth issue, "Thank You For The Coffee" was released on January 21, 2008.

Inspector Lupo investigates the crime scene where Five killed the mysterious masked men, while Spaceboy and Rumor proclaim their love for each other and share a kiss. Five finds Sir Reginald Hargreeves's monocle, which allows someone to see everything about a person, and faints. The White Violin attacks the Umbrella Academy, and Dr. Pogo dies in the process.

=== Issue #6: "Finale" Or "Brothers And Sisters, I Am An Atomic Bomb" ===
The sixth issue, "Finale" Or "Brothers And Sisters, I Am An Atomic Bomb" was released on February 20, 2008.

Together, Spaceboy, Kraken, Rumor, Séance and Five prepare to stop the Apocalypse Suite. Rumor tries to kill the White Violin, but fails due to past emotions; Rumor suffers a slashed throat from the White Violin and Spaceboy takes her to a nearby hospital. Kraken, Séance and Five continue to fight the Orchestra Verdammten, and end the fight when Five shoots the White Violin in the head, although not fatally. Séance then uses telekinesis to stop meteors falling to the earth and stops the end of the world. In the epilogue, it is learned that Vanya remains paralyzed and Rumor will never be able to talk again, thus leaving her unable to use her powers. Spaceboy, Kraken, Séance and Five return to the academy to find it destroyed, crushed by the Eiffel Tower.

== Collected editions ==
The series has been collected as a trade paperback:

The Umbrella Academy: The Apocalypse Suite (by Gerard Way & Gabriel Bá, includes all six issues from The Apocalypse Suite, extracts from sketchbooks featuring early versions of characters, the short internet preview and the story from Free Comic Book Day 2007, limited edition hardcover, ISBN 1-59582-163-5, softcover, ISBN 1-59307-978-8).

== Awards and nominations ==
At the 2008 Eisner Awards, The Umbrella Academy: Apocalypse Suite won for Best Limited Series.

The Deluxe Edition of The Umbrella Academy: Apocalypse Suite is nominated for Best Graphic Album — Reprint at the 2009 Eisner Awards.

== Sequel ==
A sequel, The Umbrella Academy: Dallas, was published between November 2008 and April 2009 and collected into a trade paperback on September 30, 2009.
