= David Castañeda =

American actor (born 1989)

- Castañeda in 2026
- Born: 24 October 1989 (age 37); Los Angeles, California, U.S.
- Education: California State University, Fullerton (BA)
- Occupation: Actor
- Years active: 2009–present

David Castañeda Jr. (born October 24, 1989) is an American actor. In 2019, Castañeda began portraying Diego Hargreeves in the Netflix series The Umbrella Academy.

== Early life and education ==
Castañeda was born October 24, 1989, in Los Angeles and was raised in Sinaloa, Mexico. (Note: One source says he is a native of Sinaloa, Mexico and moved to the US at age 14. Another source says he was born in Los Angeles, raised in Mexico, then went to the US for high school.) He returned to the United States when he was 4 and attended William Workman High School in California. Castañeda initially studied civil engineering in college with the intention of taking over the family business after he finished his studies. However, he became interested in film direction and switched to major in film production and international business in 2007 at California State University, Fullerton. Castañeda then moved into acting and started auditioning for roles. He studied part-time while pursuing an acting career, eventually graduating in 2015.

== Career ==
Castañeda has been involved in acting since he was 17, but only started taking acting more seriously after he volunteered for a role when a director asked for actors to participate in his film during a seminar while at university. He played various minor roles in a number of productions, such as End of Watch, and also acted as a main character in a short film Maddoggin', which won the audience award at the NBC Universal Short Cut Film Festival. In 2013, he landed a role playing Jorge on ABC Family's TV series Switched at Birth. In late 2016, he was cast in the role of Hector in the film Sicario: Day of the Soldado released in 2018. He also has a major role in an independent film El Chicano, a supporting role in Jean-Claude Van Damme's We Die Young as well as minor roles in films such as the Billy Crystal's film Standing Up, Falling Down.

In 2017, he was cast in his most prominent role yet playing Diego Hargreeves / Number 2 in The Umbrella Academy, which was released on Netflix in February 2019, the first of a four season run.

== Filmography ==
Key
†	Denotes films that have not yet been released

=== Film ===
Year	Title	Role	Notes
2009	Drive-By Chronicles: Sidewayz	Saul	
2011	Maddoggin	Pedro González	Short film
2012	End of Watch	Mexican Cowboy	
2015	Freaks of Nature	Tony Cerone	
2015	Human Behavior	Mark	Short film
2016	Love Sanchez	Rene	
2017	The Ascent	Louis Medina	
2017	Corrida	Jefe	Short film
2017	Why?	He	Short film
2018	Sicario: Day of the Soldado	Hector	
2018	El Chicano	Shotgun	
2019	Standing Up, Falling Down	Ruis	
2019	We Die Young	Rincon	
2020	The Tax Collector	Vargas	
2021	The Guilty	Officer Tim Geraci	
2025	Ballerina	Javier Macarro	
2025	Splitsville	Fede	
TBA	What the F*ck Is My Password †	TBA	Post-production

=== Television ===
Year	Title	Role	Notes
2009	Lie to Me	Boyfriend	1 episode
2009, 2012	Southland	Tough Kid, Carlos	2 episodes
2014	Switched at Birth	Jorge	7 episodes
2014–2015	Jane the Virgin	Nicholas	3 episodes
2015	Bound and Babysitting	Eddie	TV movie
2015	The Player	Listo Salvado	1 episode
2016	Blindspot	Carlos	1 episode
2016	Going Dark	Sam	Unaired TV pilot
2017	The Legend of Master Legend	Mandy Mandujano	Unaired TV pilot
2019–2024	The Umbrella Academy	Diego Hargreeves	Main cast
2022	Robot Chicken	Interrogator / My Strange Addiction Narrator (voice)	Episode: "May Cause Involuntary Political Discharge"
2023	Poker Face	Jimmy	Episode: "Escape from Shit Mountain"
2023	Most Dangerous Game	Victor Suero	Main cast (season 2)
