= Jessica Greco =

Canadian actress (born 1980)

- Born: June 26, 1980 (age 45); Thornhill, Ontario, Canada
- Years active: 1996-present

Jessica Greco (born June 26, 1980) is a Canadian actress and comedian best known for playing Karen Thurston, the dead teenage daughter of a chemical factory worker, in the 1997 television adaptation of the Goosebumps book Welcome to Dead House. Greco has gone on to act in numerous television and film roles, including in the films Twitches, Treed Murray and Girl in the Bunker.

== Personal life ==
Greco was born in Thornhill, Ontario. She began her acting career at a young age, studying at The Neighbourhood Playhouse, and alongside acting, went on to create an award-winning web series, That’s My DJ. Greco is also a comedy writer and performer, having co-founded the Canadian Comedy Award nominated sketch troupe Dame Judy Dench, and co-created the Fringe 2017 piece 32 Short Sketches About Bees which went on to win Second City's "Outstanding New Comedy" award and the "My Theatre award for Best Comedy Sketch/Improv". She is active on social media, and maintains a Twitter account. Greco continues to be involved in regular comedy performances in Toronto, Canada.

== Acting career ==
Greco has acted in a number of films, short films and television productions, mostly Canadian-based. She is recognized outside of Canada mostly for her role in Welcome to Dead House, a made-for-TV film and season 2 instalment of Goosebumps, which had mainstream recognition from an international audience. Greco is known for her distinctive appearance in the film, which included braided red hair, an old hat, and a shirt with an unknown letter G oval crown symbol on the front. More recently, Greco has appeared in roles for films Tammy's Always Dying and The Animal Project. Recent television roles include acting in Tiny Pretty Things and Tokens, the latter of for which she was nominated for The 18th Annual ACTRA Awards in Toronto's "Outstanding Performance (Female)".

== Filmography ==
Year	Title	Role
1997	Welcome to Dead House	Karen Thurston
2000	Gossip	Charlene
2000	Rivals	Samantha Gardner
2001	Treed Murray	Kelly
2003	The Recruit	Hot Girl At Blue Ridge
2004	The Crypt Club	Pearl
2004	Evel Knievel	Charmaine
2005	Assault on Precinct 13	Coral
2005	Our Fathers	Judy
2005	Twitches	Lucinda
2006	The House	Julie
2006	The Marsh	Teen Mercy
2013	The Animal Project	Pippa
2013	Sunday Punch	Anna
2015	How To Plan an Orgy in a Small Town	Dr. Valsky
2016	Antibirth	Donna
2016	Prisoner X	Anna
2016	Milton's Secret	Carter's Mom
2018	Girl in the Bunker	Katherine Heath
2018	The Go-Getters	Ticket Lady
2018	Blue/Red	Rita
2018	Jessica Jessica	Jessica
2018	The Hummingbird Project	Dr. Bloom
2019	Tammy's Always Dying	Kelly Seamus
2021	Trashed	Jules

- Filmography excludes roles in television shows, except for made-for-TV films and short films.
