= The Umbrella Academy =

Dark Horse comic book series

- Promotional artwork

Publication information
- Publisher: Dark Horse Comics
- Schedule: Every third Wednesday (volumes 1–2)
- Format: Limited series
- Genre: Superhero, science fantasy, magical realism, black comedy, absurdism
- Publication date: 2007–2009; 2018–2021; 2025–present
- No. of issues: 21 (main series); 7 (spin-offs)
- Main character(s): Spaceboy; The Kraken; The Rumor; The Séance; Number Five; Vanya Hargreeves

Creative team
- Created by: Gerard Way; Gabriel Bá
- Written by: Gerard Way; Gabriel Bá (volume 4)
- Artist(s): Gabriel Bá; James Jean (covers for volume 1 only)
- Letterer(s): Jason Hvam (Internet preview only); Nate Piekos
- Colorist(s): Dave Stewart (volumes 1–2, 4); Nick Filardi (volume 3)

Collected editions
- Apocalypse Suite: ISBN 978-1-59307-978-9
- Dallas: ISBN 978-1-59582-345-8
- Hotel Oblivion: ISBN 978-1-5067-1142-3

The Umbrella Academy is an absurdist superhero comic book series created by writer Gerard Way and artist Gabriel Bá. It follows a dysfunctional family of adopted superhero siblings with bizarre powers attempting both to save the world and find their place within it. Published by Dark Horse Comics, the comic is released in limited series, typically lasting six issues. Since 2007, three volumes have been completed, as have two spin-offs. The fourth volume of the main series began publication in June 2025.

The comic has garnered a devoted following and has been praised by critics, with the first limited series, Apocalypse Suite, winning the 2007 Eisner Award for Best Finite Series/Limited Series. A popular television adaptation ran on Netflix from 2019 to 2024.

== Synopsis ==
=== Plot summary ===
The titular Umbrella Academy is described as a "dysfunctional family of superheroes". In the mid-20th century, at the instant of the finishing blow in a cosmic wrestling match, forty-three superpowered infants are inexplicably born to random, unconnected women across the world who showed no signs of pregnancy at the start of the day. Sir Reginald Hargreeves, an extraterrestrial disguised as a famous entrepreneur, adopts seven of the children and prepares them to save the world from an unspecified threat as the Umbrella Academy.

Eventually, the team disbands and the siblings fall out of contact with each other until they meet again as adults on the news of Hargreeves' death, and subsequently become a team again when one of their own becomes a supervillain.

=== Characters ===
The Academy's founder, Sir Reginald Hargreeves, was an alien disguised as a wealthy human entrepreneur and world-renowned scientist, and callously trained and experimented on the children to make them into superheroes. As such, he was the cause of much of the team's psychological scarring and trauma. He is dead when the Umbrella Academy reunites.

The primary Academy members are Luther/Spaceboy, who possesses super-strength, Diego/The Kraken, who can manipulate the direction of projectiles, Allison/The Rumor, who can manipulate reality by lying, Klaus/The Séance, a psychic who can connect with the dead, and Number Five, a skilled assassin able to jump through time at will, with his travels through the timeline trapping his sixty year old mind in his unageing, ten-year-old body. Ben/The Horror possessed tentacles that emerged from his stomach, but he is also dead when the Academy comes back together.

Vanya was officially a part of the Academy, but was drugged by their father and told for years that she had no powers, before she learns she has the power to channel destructive sound waves through her violin.

=== Influences ===
Way has stated that his biggest influence on Umbrella Academy was his favorite writer, Grant Morrison, and their work on Doom Patrol with DC Comics. He has also cited Pat McEown of ZombieWorld: Champion of the Worms and his favorite artist, Edvin Biuković, and his comic Grendel Tales as other major inspirations.

== Main series ==
=== Volume 1: Apocalypse Suite ===
Written by Gerard Way with art by Gabriel Bá, the first six-issue limited series, Apocalypse Suite, was released by Dark Horse Comics between September 14, 2007, and February 20, 2008. It won the 2007 Eisner Award for Best Finite Series/Limited Series, and was adapted into the first season of the Netflix series in 2019.

In the story, the estranged members of the Umbrella Academy are reunited by the funeral of Sir Reginald Hargreeves, their father and leader, whose rigorous training and experiments during their childhoods has left them each emotionally scarred. They then have to band together when their long-lost brother, Number Five, returns from the future and tells them they need to stop an apocalyptic event from coming to pass.

=== Volume 2: Dallas ===
A second limited series, Dallas, was released between November 26, 2008, and April 25, 2009. Elements of it were adapted in the first season of the Netflix series in 2019, and it was the primary story adapted into the second season a year later.

This story sees the Umbrella Academy having split up once again after saving the world, but while each sibling is distracted by their own problems, the team is forced to reunite when the Temps Aeternalis, an organization that manages the timeline, attack the members and drag them into a time travel plot revolving around the Kennedy assassination in 1963 Dallas.

=== Volume 3: Hotel Oblivion ===
The third limited series, subtitled Hotel Oblivion, was announced to be in development in 2009, and Dark Horse initially stated it would release in 2010. However, the comic was not released for several years, with Way shifting focus from comics to his music career for a time before continuing work on it with Bá in 2014. Hotel Oblivion was finally released as a seven-issue miniseries between October 3, 2018, and June 12, 2019. Some elements were loosely adapted in the third season of the Netflix series.

In this story, Spaceboy and the Kraken travel to space to investigate a discovery of their father's, while the Rumor and Five investigate the Perseus Corporation and what they want with the titular Hotel Oblivion, a mysterious prison on another planet where Hargreeves imprisoned the Academy's greatest enemies.

=== Volume 4: Plan B ===
In July 2020, Gerard Way revealed that the fourth story arc would be titled Sparrow Academy. In August 2024, Gabriel Bá revealed he was actively illustrating the comic, but was unsure of the release date. In February 2025, Dark Horse announced the first issue of the miniseries, now renamed The Umbrella Academy: Plan B, would release on June 11, 2025. It is the main storyline adapted in the third season of the Netflix series, presumably based on an outline by Way.

Picking up in the aftermath of Hotel Oblivion, the story sees the Umbrellas having to face off against a new team of superheroes known as "The Sparrows", and discover their connection to Hargreeves and their origins.

== Spin-offs ==
All Umbrella Academy spin-off series and one-shots are subtitled as Tales from the Umbrella Academy, published intermittently since 2019. These comics focus on individual characters from the main series, and dive further into their backstories while sending them on new adventures.

=== Hazel and Cha-Cha Save Christmas ===
The one-shot issue Hazel and Cha-Cha Save Christmas was written by Gerard Way and Scott Allie, with art by Tommy Lee Edwards, and was published on November 20, 2019. In it, Hazel and Cha-Cha, two psychotic time-traveling hitmen introduced in Dallas, are sent on a mission to stop a rogue agent from disrupting the timeline at Christmastime.

=== You Look Like Death ===
A six-issue limited series, You Look Like Death, written by Gerard Way and Shaun Simon with art by Ian Culbard, was published between September 16, 2020 and February 24, 2021. The series follows a young Klaus's misadventures in Hollywood, as he encounters a manipulative struggling actress and deals with the politics of the vampire mafia.

== Short stories ==
Prior to the release of Apocalypse Suite #1, three Umbrella Academy short stories were published, both online and in print form. There have been a few short stories released since then, often included in the trade collections of the main series. The majority of them are written by Gerard Way and illustrated by Gabriel Bá.

=== "Mon Dieu!" ===
Released on the Dark Horse website on November 2, 2006, "Mon Dieu!" was colored by Dan Jackson and lettered by Jason Hvam. It is a two-page preview story in which a time machine, built by Number Five, causes the Séance to briefly experience life as a Medieval French military commander, and is included in the Apocalypse Suite trade collection.

=== "…But the Past Ain’t Through With You" ===
Cover of the 2007 Dark Horse Comics Free Comic Book Day issue, featuring the first printed story of The Umbrella Academy, "…But the Past Ain’t Through With You".

The first printed story of the series, "...But the Past Ain't Through With You" takes its title from a lyric from the My Chemical Romance song "Kill All Your Friends", co-written by Way. It was published in the 2007 Dark Horse Comics Free Comic Book Day issue on May 5, 2007, and is included in the Apocalypse Suite collection. The story sees the Umbrella Academy investigating the murder of a duplicate of the Rumor, and battling the Murder Magician.

=== "Safe & Sound" ===
“Safe & Sound" is an eight-page story published in the first issue of the second volume of the anthology Dark Horse Presents in July 2007, exclusively on MySpace. The title comes from a song Way worked on with Kyosuke Himuro for the movie Final Fantasy VII Advent Children Complete. The story is not published elsewhere, and centers around the Kraken on a rescue mission to save the daughter of his city's mayor.

=== "Anywhere But Here" ===
In 2009, Dark Horse released the eight-page story "Anywhere But Here" on their MySpace, and later in the collections Dallas and MySpace Dark Horse Presents Volume 2. It takes place in the Hargreeves siblings' teenage years, and focuses on the relationship between Diego and Vanya, culminating in what ultimately causes the rift between them.

=== "Letters to Athena" ===
The eight-page story "Letters to Athena" was published in the hardcover edition of You Look Like Death, and has not been reprinted elsewhere.

=== "Safe" ===
Gabriel Bá wrote and illustrated the short story "Safe" for the Dark Horse one-shot Free Comic Book Day 2023: The Umbrella Academy and The Witcher No. 1, which was published on May 10, 2023. In it, Sir Reginald Hargreeves and his assistant, Abhijat, investigate a powerful interdimensional entity that was teased in Hotel Oblivion. The comic's ending teases the story's continuation in Plan B.

== Collected editions ==
The Umbrella Academy is collected in trade paperbacks and limited edition hardcovers. The hardcover editions have larger pages and a few more extra features.

Title	Release date	Material collected	Extras	ISBN
The Umbrella Academy
The Umbrella Academy – Volume 1: Apocalypse Suite	June 18, 2008 (TPB); November 19, 2008 (HC)	Apocalypse Suite #1–6; "Mon Dieu!”; "…But the Past Ain’t Through with You”	Sketchbook; ʟɪᴍɪᴛᴇᴅ ᴇᴅɪᴛɪᴏɴ ʜᴀʀᴅᴄᴏᴠᴇʀ: Expanded sketchbook; Signed tip in sheet	978-1-59307-978-9 (TPB); 978-1-59582-163-8 (HC)
The Umbrella Academy – Volume 2: Dallas	September 30, 2009 (TPB); September 30, 2009 (HC)	Dallas #1–6; "Anywhere But Here”	Sketchbook; ʟɪᴍɪᴛᴇᴅ ᴇᴅɪᴛɪᴏɴ ʜᴀʀᴅᴄᴏᴠᴇʀ: Expanded sketchbook	978-1-59582-345-8 (TPB); 978-1-59582-344-1 (HC)
The Umbrella Academy – Volume 3: Hotel Oblivion	September 17, 2019 (TPB)	Hotel Oblivion #1–7	Sketchbook; Limited edition hardcover	978-1-5067-1142-3 (TPB)
Tales from the Umbrella Academy
You Look Like Death: Tales from the Umbrella Academy – Volume 1	2021 (TPB)	You Look Like Death #1–6	Sketchbook; Forward from Robert Sheehan; ʟɪᴍɪᴛᴇᴅ ᴇᴅɪᴛɪᴏɴ ʜᴀʀᴅᴄᴏᴠᴇʀ: Expanded sketchbook; "Seance"; Slipcase by Tony Ong	978-1-5067-1910-8 (TPB) 9781506725987 (HC)

== In other media ==
=== Television ===
A film version of The Umbrella Academy was optioned by Universal Studios, but never produced. By 2017, Netflix had greenlit a live-action series adaptation of The Umbrella Academy, produced by Universal Content Productions. Way, who served as co-executive producer on the series, stated that he presented showrunner Steve Blackman with an eighteen-page document outlining his full plan for the comic series, including the comics that have not yet been released.

The series premiered on Netflix on February 15, 2019, and the first two seasons primarily adapted the Apocalypse Suite and Dallas storylines, and were met with positive reactions from critics and audiences for their humor, action, character drama, and music. The second season of The Umbrella Academy became one of Netflix's most-viewed shows in 2020, behind series such as The Queen's Gambit and Ratched.

Since the second season also adapted the twist ending from Hotel Oblivion, the show's third season adapted the then-unpublished Sparrow Academy story arc, with some elements from Hotel Oblivion. The season still received positive reviews, though many deemed it weaker than it previous installments. The fourth season, serving as the conclusion to the story, presumably adapted another unpublished part of Way's outline, and was much shorter than the previous seasons had been. It received very mixed reactions from many critics and audiences.

=== Novels ===
To coincide with the release of the TV series' final season, Universal Content Productions partnered with Abrams Books to release two books set in the show's universe. These were The Umbrella Academy: Young Blood, a prequel novel, and Umbrella Academy: The Commission Handbook, an in-universe guide to the world of the series. Both books were released in the summer of 2024.

=== Card game ===
In June 2019, Dark Horse Comics announced a collaboration with Studio71 to make a card game based on The Umbrella Academy.
