= 1984 in poetry =

Nationality words link to articles with information on the nation's poetry or literature (for instance, Irish or France).

== Events ==
- December 19 – Ted Hughes' appointment as Poet Laureate of the United Kingdom in succession to Sir John Betjeman is announced, Philip Larkin having turned down the post.
- After Ghazi al-Gosaibi, the Saudi Arabian minister of health, publishes a poem, "A Pen Bought and Sold", that criticizes the corruption and privilege of the country's elite, he is dismissed from his post.
- Prvoslav Vujčić's second collection of poems, Kastriranje vetra ("Castration of the Wind"), written during a week's imprisonment in Tuzla for criticising the state, is prohibited in Yugoslavia.
- Scottish Poetry Library established.

== Works published in English ==
Listed by nation where the work was first published and again by the poet's native land, if different; substantially revised works listed separately:

=== Australia ===
- Robert Gray, The Skylight
- Jeff Guess, Leaving Maps, Adelaide: Friendly Street Poets
- Chris Wallace-Crabbe, D. Goodman and D.J. Hearn, editors, Clubbing of the Gunfire: 101 Australian War Poems, Melbourne: Melbourne University Press, anthology

=== Canada ===
- Roo Borson, The Whole Night, Coming Home, ISBN 0-7710-1579-8 (nominated for a Governor General's Award) American-Canadian
- Dionne Brand, Chronicles of the Hostile Sun
- Leonard Cohen, Book of Mercy
- Robert Finch, Double Tuning. Erin, ON: Porcupine's Quill.<finch/>
- Robert Finch, Sailboat and Lake.. Erin, ON: Porcupine's Quill.
- Paulette Jiles, Celestial Navigation
- George Johnston, Ask Again.
- Irving Layton, The Love Poems of Irving Layton: With Reverence & Delight. Oakville, Ontario: Mosaic Press, 1984.
- Irving Layton, A Spider Danced a Cosy Jig. Toronto: Stoddart.
- Dorothy Livesay, Feeling the Worlds: New Poems. Fredericton: Goose Lane.
- Miriam Mandel, The Collected Poems of Miriam Mandel. Sheila Watson, ed. Edmonton: Longspoon Press. ISBN 0-920316-50-6 ISBN 978-0920316504
- Michael Ondaatje, Secular Love, Toronto: Coach House Press, ISBN 0-88910-288-0, ISBN 0-393-01991-8; New York: W. W. Norton, 1985
- James Reaney, Imprecations: The Art of Swearing. Black Moss Press.
- Charles Sangster, The St. Lawrence and the Saguenary and other poems (revised edition), edited by Frank M. Tierney (Tecumseh)
- Raymond Souster, Jubilee of Death: The Raid On Dieppe. Ottawa: Oberon Press.
- Raymond Souster, Queen City. Ottawa: Oberon Press.

=== India, in English ===
- Kamala Das, Collected Poems Volume 1 (Poetry in English), Trivandrum: Kamala Das
- Nissim Ezekiel, Latter-Day Psalms (Poetry in English), Delhi
- Arvind Krishna Mehrotra, Middle Earth (Poetry in English), New Delhi: Oxford University Press, ISBN 0-19-561604-9
- Suniti Namjoshi, From the Bedside Book of Nightmares (Poetry in English), Fredericton, New Brunswick : Fiddlehead, ISBN 0-86492-031-8

=== Ireland ===
- Seamus Heaney Northern Ireland native at this time living in the United States:
  - Hailstones, Gallery Press
  - Station Island, Faber & Faber,
  - Sweeney Astray (see also Sweeney's Flight 1992)
  - Verses for a Fordham Commencement, Nadja Press
- Thomas McCarthy, The Non-Aligned Storyteller, Anvil Press, London, Ireland
- Medbh McGuckian, Venus and the Rain, first edition (see revised edition 1994), Oldcastle: The Gallery Press
- Derek Mahon, A Kensington Notebook, Northern Ireland poet published in the United Kingdom
- Paul Muldoon, editor, The Faber Book of Contemporary Irish Poetry, an anthology of works by Patrick Kavanagh, Louis MacNeice, Thomas Kinsella, John Montague, Seamus Heaney, Michael Longley, Derek Mahon, Paul Durcan, Tom Paulin and Medbh McGuckian.

=== New Zealand ===
- Fleur Adcock, editor, Oxford Book of Contemporary New Zealand Poetry
- Charles Brasch, Collected Poems, Auckland: Oxford University Press, posthumous
- Alan Brunton, And She Said, New York:Red Mole
- Lauris Edmond, Selected Poems, winner of the Commonwealth Poetry Prize in 1985
- Bill Manhire, Zoetropes: Poems 1972-82
- Cilla McQueen, Anti Gravity
- Ian Wedde:
  - Georgicon
  - Tales of Gotham City

=== United Kingdom ===
- Peter Ackroyd, T. S. Eliot: A Life (biography)
- Samuel Beckett, Collected Poems 1930–78
- James Berry (editor), News for Babylon: The Chatto Book of Westindian-British Poetry
- Alison Brackenbury, Breaking Ground
- George Mackay Brown, Christmas Poems
- Charles Causley, Secret Destinations
- David Constantine, Mappa Mundi
- Gavin Ewart:
  - The Ewart Quarto
  - Festival Nights
- U. A. Fanthorpe, Voices Off
- Alison Fell, Kisses for Mayakovsky
- James Fenton, Children in Exile: Poems 1968-1984 Salamander Press version, poems from this volume were combined with those from The Memory of War to make the Penguin volume titled The Memory of War and Children in Exile; that combined volume was published in the United States, also under the title Children in Exile
- Roy Fuller, Mianserin Sonnets
- Geoffrey Grigson, Montaigne's Tower, and Other Poems
- Seamus Heaney Northern Ireland native at this time living in the United States:
  - Hailstones, Gallery Press
  - Station Island, Faber & Faber,
  - Sweeney Astray (see also Sweeney's Flight 1992)
  - Verses for a Fordham Commencement, Nadja Press
- John Hegley, Visions of the Bone Idol (Poems about Dogs and Glasses)
- Selima Hill, Saying Hello at the Station
- Liz Lochhead, Dreaming Franenstein and Collected Poems (includes Memo for Spring 1972, Islands 1978, The Grimm Sisters 1981)
- Medbh McGuckian, Venus and the Rain
- Derek Mahon, A Kensington Notebook, Northern Ireland poet published in the United Kingdom
- E. A. Markham, Human Rites
- Christopher Middleton, Serpentine
- Edwin Morgan, Sonnets from Scotland
- Blake Morrison, Dark Glasses
- Andrew Motion, Dangerous Play
- Grace Nichols, The Fat Black Woman's Poems, Virago
- Fiona Pitt-Kethley, London
- Peter Porter, Fast Forward
- Craig Raine, Rich
- Peter Reading, C
- Jeremy Reed, By the Fisheries
- Charles Tomlinson, Notes from New York; and Other Poems

=== United States ===
- John Ashbery, A Wave, awarded the Lenore Marshall Poetry Prize and the Bollingen Prize
- Charles Bernstein and Bruce Andrews, The L=A=N=G=U=A=G=E Book, "selected" pieces from the 13 issues of L=A=N=G=U=A=G=E magazine (Carbondale: Southern Illinois University Press)
- Joseph Brodsky, To Urania
- Alan Brunton, And She Said, Red Mole, book by a New Zealand poet published in the United States
- Louise Erdrich, Jacklight
- Seamus Heaney Northern Ireland native at this time living in the United States:
  - Station Island, Faber & Faber,
  - Verses for a Fordham Commencement, Nadja Press
  - Hailstones, Gallery Press* Denise Levertov, Breathing the Water, her 19th book of poetry
- Sharon Olds, The Dead and the Living
- Michael Palmer, First Figure (North Point Press)
- Molly Peacock, Raw Heaven
- Kenneth Rexroth, Selected Poems
- Rosmarie Waldrop, Differences for Four Hands (Singing Horse)

==== Criticism, scholarship and biography in the United States ====
- 'The Rhapsodic Fallacy' by Mary Kinzie appears in Salmagundi 65

=== Other English language ===
- Judith Moffett, James Merrill: An Introduction to the Poetry
- Hariprasad Sastri, editor and translator, Indian Mystic Verse, 3rd revised and enlarged edition; New Delhi: Macmillan (first edition 1941) anthology

== Works published in other languages ==
=== Denmark ===
- Klaus Høeck; Denmark:
  - Blåvand revisited, with Asger Schnack, publisher: Schønberg
  - International Klein Bleu, publisher: Gyldendal
  - Marienbad, publisher: Brøndum
- Henrik Nordbrandt, 84 digte ("84 Poems"); Copenhagen: Gylendal, 125 pages

=== Poland ===
- S. Barańczak, editor, Poeta pamieta ("The poet remembers"), anthology
- Stanisław Barańczak, Uciekinier z utopii. O poezji Zbigniewa Herberta ("Fugitive from Utopia: On the Poetry of Zbigniew Herbert"), criticism; London: Polonia
- Czesław Miłosz, Nieobjeta ziemia ("The Unencompassed Earth"); Paris: Instytut Literacki
- Jarosław Marek Rymkiewicz, Mogila Ordona ("Ordon's Grave")

=== India ===
Listed in alphabetical order by first name:

- Faiz Ahmad Faiz, Nuskha-hae Wafa; Urdu-language* Nirendranath Chakravarti; Bengali-language:
  - Roop-Kahini, Kolkata: Ananda Publishers
  - Shomoi Boro Kom, Kolkata: Proma Prokashoni
- Rituraj, Nahin Prabodhachandrodya, Bikaner: Dharati Prakashan; Hindi-language
- Saroop Dhruv, Mara Hathni Vat, Ahmedabad: Nakshatra Trust, Ahmedabad; Gujarati-language
- K. Satchidanandan, Socrateesum Kozhiyum, ("Socrates and the Cock"); Malayalam-language

=== Other languages ===
- Christoph Buchwald, general editor, and Gregory Laschen, guest editor, Luchterhand Jahrbuch der Lyrik 1984 ("Luchterhand Poetry Yearbook 1984"), publisher: Luchterhand Literaturverlag; anthology; Germany
- Matilde Camus, Raíz del recuerdo ("Root of remembrance"), Spain
- Odysseus Elytis, Ημερολόγιο ενός αθέατου Απριλίου ("Diary of an Invisible April"), Greece
- Ndoc Gjetja, Çaste ("Moments"); Albania
- Rita Kelly, An Bealach Éadóigh, Ireland
- Alexander Mezhirov, Тысяча мелочей ("A thousand small things"), Russia, Soviet Union
- Eugenio Montale, Tutte le poesie, enlarged from the original 1977 edition; publisher: Mondadori; posthumous; Italy
- Jacques Prévert, La Cinquième Saison, published posthumously (died 1977); France
- Jean Royer, Jours d'atelier, Saint-Lambert: Le Noroît; Canada, in French
- Håkan Sandell, Efter sjömännen; Elektrisk måne ("After the sailors; Electric Moon"), Sweden

== Awards and honors ==
Nobel Prize in Literature: Jaroslav Seifert, a Czech poet

=== Australia ===
- Kenneth Slessor Prize for Poetry: Les Murray, The People's Other World

=== Canada ===
- Gerald Lampert Award: Sandra Birdsell, Night Travellers and Jean McKay, Gone to Grass
- 1984 Governor General's Awards: Paulette Jiles, Celestial Navigation (English); Nicole Brossard, Double Impression (French)
- Pat Lowther Award: Bronwen Wallace, Signs of the Former Tenant
- Prix Émile-Nelligan: Normand de Bellefeuille, Le Livre du devoir

=== Japan ===
- Japanese 100 yen note, starting this year and through 2004, features a portrait of Natsume Sōseki 夏目 漱石 (commonly referred to as "Sōseki"), pen name of Natsume Kinnosuke 夏目金之助 (1867–1916), Meiji Era novelist, haiku poet, composer of Chinese-style poetry, writer of fairy tales and a scholar of English literature

=== United Kingdom ===
- Cholmondeley Award: Michael Baldwin (poet), Michael Hofmann, Carol Rumens
- Eric Gregory Award: Martyn Crucefix, Mick Imlah, Jamie McKendrick, Bill Smith, Carol Ann Duffy, Christopher Meredith, Peter Armstrong, Iain Bamforth

=== United States ===
- Agnes Lynch Starrett Poetry Prize: Arthur Smith, Elegy on Independence Day
- Bernard F. Connors Prize for Poetry: Gjertrud Schnackenberg, "Imaginary Prisons", and (separately) Sharon Ben-Tov, "Carillon for Cambridge Women"
- Consultant in Poetry to the Library of Congress (later the post would be called "Poet Laureate Consultant in Poetry to the Library of Congress"): Robert Fitzgerald appointed this year in a health-limited capacity, but was not present at the Library of Congress.
- Frost Medal: Jack Stadler
- Pulitzer Prize for Poetry: Mary Oliver: American Primitive
- Rhysling Award:
  - Joe Haldeman, Saul's Death: Two Sestina's (Long Form)
  - Helen Ehrlich, Two Sonnets (Short Form)
- Fellowship of the Academy of American Poets: Richmond Lattimore and Robert Francis

== Births ==
- Ailbhe Ní Ghearbhuigh, Irish-language poet
- Legna Rodríguez Iglesias, Cuban poet

== Deaths ==
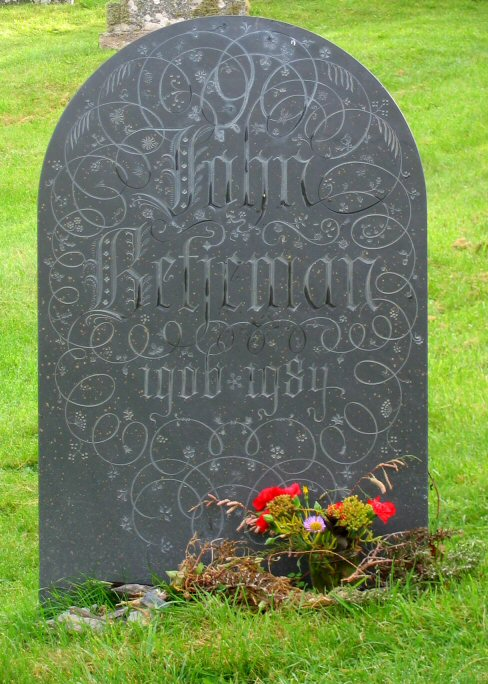
Headstone of John Betjeman

Birth years link to the corresponding "[year] in poetry" article:

- January 18 – Ary dos Santos, 46 (born 1937), Portuguese, of cirrhosis
- February 6 – Jorge Guillén, 91 (born 1893), Spanish
- February 8 – Ishizuka Tomoji 石塚友二 the kanji (Japanese writing) is a pen name of Ishizuka Tomoji, which is written with the different kanji 石塚友次, but in English there is no difference (born 1906), Japanese, Shōwa period haiku poet and novelist
- February 17 – Jesse Stuart, 76 (born 1906), American, from a stroke
- February 26 – Richmond Lattimore, 77 (born 1906), American poet and translator, of cancer
- March 3 – Tatsuko Hoshino 星野立子 (born 1903), Japanese, Shōwa period haiku poet and travel writer; founded Tamamo, a haiku magazine exclusively for women; in the Hototogisu literary circle; haiku selector for Asahi Shimbun newspaper; contributed to haiku columns in various newspapers and magazines (a woman)
- April 15 – Sir William Empson, 77 (born 1906), English critic
- May 19 – Sir John Betjeman, 77 (born 1906), English poet laureate, of Parkinson's disease
- July 2 – George Oppen, 76 (born 1908), American, of Alzheimer's disease
- August 26 – Rukhl Fishman (born 1935), Israeli poet of Yiddish poetry
- September 14 (possible date) – Richard Brautigan 49 (born 1935), American novelist and poet, of a self-inflicted gunshot wound; the exact date of his suicide is speculative as his body is not found until October 25
- September 29 – Hal Porter, 73 (born 1911), Australian writer, novelist, playwright and poet
- December 8 – Edward James, 77 (born 1907), English poet and patron of the arts and of surrealism
- December 14 – Vicente Aleixandre, 86 (born 1898), Spanish
- December 29 – Robert Farren (Roibeárd Ó Faracháin), 75 (born 1909), Irish

== See also ==
- Poetry
- List of years in poetry
- List of poetry awards
