= Toronto Maple Leafs in popular culture =

The National Hockey League (NHL)'s Toronto Maple Leafs has been the point of subject for a number of media in Canadian popular culture, including artworks, books, novels, and songs.

== Film ==
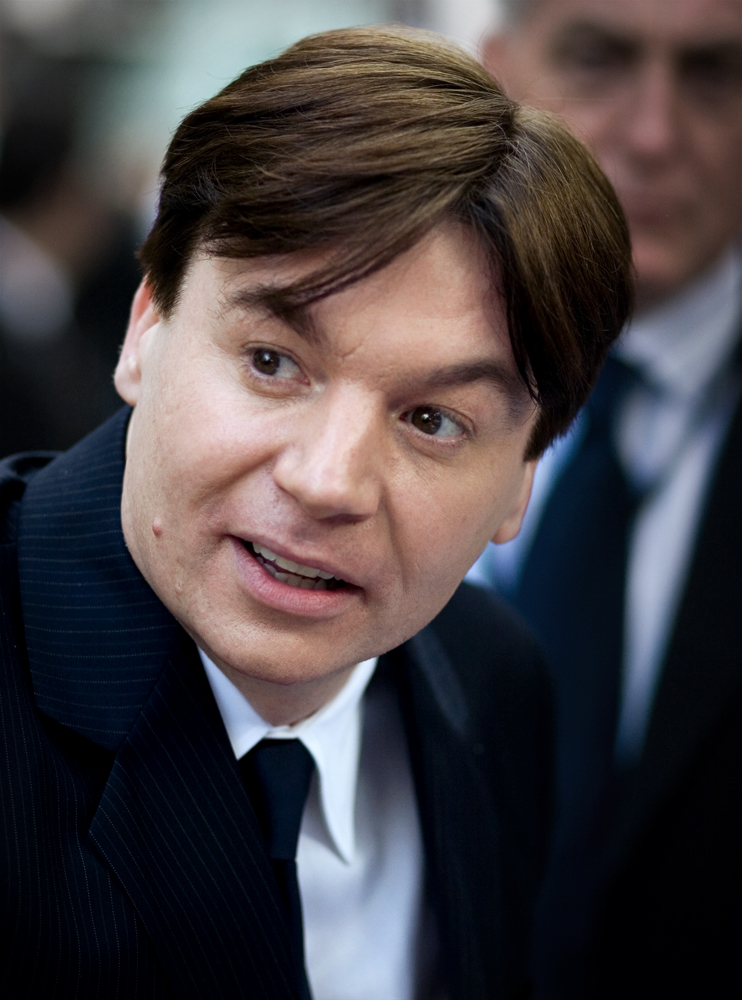
Comedian Mike Myers has often included references to the Toronto Maple Leafs in his films.

References to the Toronto Maple Leafs have been made typically in association with the city of Toronto, such as the case in the beginning of the 2010 spy film Fair Game. During the scene, CIA agent Valerie Plame was being questioned by a suspicious weapons trafficker. He asks her if she is an American, and after responding that she is Canadian, he asks her about the Leafs. She replies that she is not a fan.

The rivalry between the Maple Leafs and the Montreal Canadiens was also featured in the National Film Board of Canada's adaptation of The Hockey Sweater by Roch Carrier. Completed a year after the book's publication, the National Film Board of Canada adapted the story into a ten-minute animated short film called The Sweater. It was animated by Sheldon Cohen and voiced by Carrier. The film became one of the National Film Board's most popular works and has won numerous awards. It was named the Best Animated Film at the 1981 British Academy Film Awards.

Another film where the hockey club was heavily featured was in Face-Off, a Canadian film about a rookie Maple Leafs player and his romance with a musician. The film featured several players from the NHL, including Bobby Orr, George Armstrong, and Gordie Howe. The 1993 film Gross Misconduct focused on the life of former Maple Leafs left wing Brian Spencer. The hockey club was also featured in the 2006 television documentary series Hockey: A People's History, by the Canadian Broadcasting Corporation.

Comedian Mike Myers, a fan, often included references and even an entire plot line in his films. In Austin Powers in Goldmember, the ticker below the news item on a television reads, "Maple Leafs win Stanley Cup". In another scene, the character Mini-Me wears a Maple Leafs sweater. In addition to the references included in several films, the Maple Leafs also played a central role in Myers' 2008 film The Love Guru, where he played a guru hired to help the Maple Leafs' star player.

== Literature ==
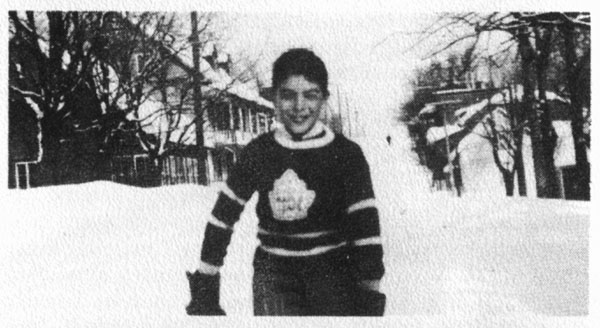
Roch Carrier, author of The Hockey Sweater, as a child in a Maple Leafs sweater.

References to the Leafs in literature includes Foster Hewitt juvenile hockey novel, He Shoots, He Scores!. Published in 1949, it featured the members of the team, including actual managers and players. In 1963, Scott Young wrote A Boy at the Leafs' Camp, a children's book giving a behind-the-scenes insight into the sport.

Several books concerning the Maple Leafs have been written, and later readapted into film. In 1971, Young and George Robertson co-wrote an adult hockey-romance novel, Face-off, about the experiences of a star rookie player, Billy Duke, with the Leafs. The novel became a movie in 1971 with Art Hindle as Billy Duke. The film featured many of the players. Jim McKenny, body-doubled for Hindle for the on-ice action scenes because of his resemblance to Hindle. Owner Ballard had a part as the team doctor.

In 1979, Roch Carrier wrote the short story The Hockey Sweater about a Montreal Canadiens fan who is mistakenly sent a sweater of their rival, the Maple Leafs. Originally published in French as "Une abominable feuille d'érable sur la glace" ("An abominable maple leaf on the ice"), it referred to the Maple Leafs sweater a mother forced her son to wear. The boy is forced to wear the sweater and faces persecution of his peers and coach, also fans of the Canadiens. The boy is presumably based on Carrier himself when he was young. In 1980, the story was turned into an animated short by the National Film Board of Canada. An excerpt of the book is featured on the Canadian five-dollar Canadian Journey bills, a series of banknotes issued from 2002 to 2013.

== Radio shows ==
In 1946, the comedy team of Wayne and Shuster performed a sketch on their CBC radio program in which the imaginary hockey team, the Mimico Mice, competed against the Leafs. Foster Hewitt provided the play-by-play of the game, with real player names used for the Leafs and Wayne and Shuster voiced the entire Mimico team.

== Song ==
In the video for the hit Leo Sayer song “When I Need You” (1976), he walks on the beach in Brighton, U.K. wearing a Toronto Maple Leafs sweater under his half done-up jacket. In 1990 live videos for the song "F*!#in' Up", Neil Young sports a Toronto Maple Leafs jersey. In 1992, Canadian rock band The Tragically Hip released the song "Fifty Mission Cap", which memorialized Bill Barilko. Barilko scored the series winning goal for the 1951 Stanley Cup Finals before disappearing months later. On October 17, 2017, several days after the death of The Tragically Hip's lead singer Gord Downie, the Maple Leafs held a moment of silence prior to their game, as well as lower the banner of Barilko's retired number.

Other songs which reference the team includes Out for a Rip by hip-hop artist B.Rich, which stated his desire to see the club win the Stanley Cup, stating that "if the Leafs win the Cup," he would jump in a lake. In a rare French-language example, Québecois singer Bob Bissonnette praises the club, and the tradition of Hockey Night in Canada in his song 'Maple Leafs.' Canadian musician Joni Mitchell also mentions the Leafs in the song “Raised on Robbery” which is featured on her 1974 album Court and Spark.

== Visual art ==
College station of the Toronto subway system feature a pair of murals called Hockey Knights in Canada, named after Hockey Night in Canada; one depicting the Toronto Maple Leafs on the southbound side and facing the Montreal Canadiens on the northbound side, depicting the rivalry between the two clubs. They were created by Charles Pachter in 1984, when the Toronto Maple Leafs still played at nearby Maple Leaf Gardens.

== See also ==
- Ice hockey in popular culture
