= Ice hockey in popular culture =

Cultural depictions of the sport of ice hockey

Ice hockey, partially because of its popularity as a major professional sport, has been a source of inspiration for numerous films, television episodes and songs in North American popular culture.

== Films ==
A number of notable Hollywood films have been made about hockey. Notable hockey films include Slap Shot; The Mighty Ducks, successful enough to spawn two sequels, a cartoon series, and an NHL team named the Mighty Ducks of Anaheim (now the Anaheim Ducks); and Miracle. The first two are fictional comedies; the last is a drama based on the true story of the 1980 "Miracle on Ice" USA Olympic gold medal team.

Other hockey films include Youngblood, Hockey Night, MVP: Most Valuable Primate, H-E Double Hockey Sticks, Mystery, Alaska, The Rocket: The Maurice Richard Story, The Sweater, 95, 2010's Canadian produced miniseries "Keep Your Head Up, Kid The Don Cherry Story", its 2012 follow up, "The Wrath of Grapes" and the 1937 John Wayne film Idol of the Crowds.

One of the earliest commercial films that featured the sport prominently was the 1972 Canadian production Face-Off, starring Art Hindle. Many other films are less hockey-oriented but nonetheless prominently involve the sport. Ice Angel involves a male ice hockey player who dies and comes back to life in the body of a female figure skater. Both Happy Gilmore and The Cutting Edge centre around failed hockey players using their talents for other sports (golf and figure skating, respectively), while Wayne's World contains a number of prominent references to the sport during the film. The movie Big Daddy features actor Adam Sandler watching a hockey game involving the New York Rangers. The Jean-Claude Van Damme vehicle Sudden Death is set and shot entirely in the Pittsburgh Civic Arena, the (supposed) stage for the seventh game of the Stanley Cup Final. In the movie The Town, bank robber Doug MacRay (played by Ben Affleck) is a former draft pick of the Boston Bruins whose hockey career derails because of his propensity to get into fights with his teammates. In another Boston-based movie, The Friends of Eddie Coyle, Eddie (played by Robert Mitchum) is taken to a Boston Bruins game (against the Chicago Black Hawks during the 1972–1973 season at the old Boston Garden) right before he is killed. Upon watching Bruins great Bobby Orr, he states "Can you imagine being a kid like that? What is he, 24 or something? Greatest hockey player in the world. Number four – Bobby Orr. Geeze, what a future he’s got, huh?" The Canadian buddy cop film Bon Cop, Bad Cop features a by-the-book English Canadian teamed with a rule-bending French Canadian to investigate a series of murders connected to professional hockey.

In Quebec, the 1997 film Les Boys is a cult classic for many hockey fans, enough to spawn three sequels. The fourth installment of Les Boys featured "Hockey Legends" such as Guy Lafleur, Pierre Bouchard, Martin Brodeur, Yvon Lambert and more.

Hockey has also been referenced many times in the series known as the View Askew Movies, which were written and directed by actor/director/writer/hockey fan Kevin Smith. His first movie, Clerks, featured a street hockey game played on the roof of a store, but many of the players in the game wore ice hockey jerseys, including jerseys of the New Jersey Devils, Pittsburgh Penguins and the Soviet Union. Mallrats shows the character Brodie (Jason Lee) playing an ice hockey game on the Sega Genesis game console. Chasing Amy includes a scene in which Joey Lauren Adams and Ben Affleck attending a high school ice hockey game. Dogma did not feature ice hockey but included three street hockey playing teenagers as henchmen for a demon. More recent, Smith's film Zack and Miri Make a Porno features a rec league ice hockey scene, several Pittsburgh Penguins references and a scene outside Mellon Arena.

In the animated motion picture A Boy Named Charlie Brown (1969), Snoopy skates on the ice rink at Rockefeller Center in New York City, fantasizing about scoring the winning goal in the final game of the Stanley Cup playoffs.

Ryan O'Neal's character in the international hit 1970 film Love Story (based on the novel of the same name by Erich Segal) was a hockey player for his college.

While National Lampoon's Christmas Vacation was not a hockey movie, Chevy Chase's lead character, Clark Griswold, was famous for wearing a light Chicago Blackhawks jersey with "Griswold" and the numbers "00" on it during certain scenes. It also plays a part in Disney Channel original movies Go Figure and Genius, and romantic comedy Just Friends.

The 1986 film Ferris Bueller's Day Off features Ferris's best friend Cameron wearing a vintage Detroit Red Wings Gordie Howe jersey through most of the movie.

In the 1996 cult favorite Swingers, Trent (played by Vince Vaughn) is playing an NHL 93 video game with his friends and extolling the toughness of Jeremy Roenick (then of the Chicago Blackhawks) and takes delight in bashing Wayne Gretzky (then of the Los Angeles Kings) in the game.

In the film The Love Guru, Mike Myers is hired by the Toronto Maple Leafs as a counsel to their star player.

Dwayne Johnson starred in the film The Tooth Fairy, where he played an ice hockey player forced to moonlight as a tooth fairy.

The 2012 film Goon starred Seann William Scott as a bouncer from Boston who becomes an enforcer in a Canadian hockey league.

The 2013 Russian film Legend № 17, a biopic of Russian ice hockey legend Valeri Kharlamov from early childhood, rising to the pinnacle of the sport and his untimely death.

== Television ==
=== United States ===
Hockey also frequently shows up in American television, particularly in shows set in the colder regions of the US, such as the Northeast and Midwest. One of the recurring characters on Cheers was Eddie LeBec, a French-Canadian Boston Bruins goalie who married regular character Carla Tortelli. LeBec later was cut from the team and joined a traveling ice show; the character was eventually killed off. One memorable episode of Seinfeld, "The Face Painter", involves the antics of Elaine's face-painting boyfriend Puddy, a rabid New Jersey Devils fan, and Jerry's stubborn refusal to thank an acquaintance for New York Rangers playoff tickets after the game when he had already thanked him numerous times beforehand. In NYPD Blue, the character of PA Donna Abandando, played by Gail O'Grady and a love interest of Detective Greg Medavoy in season 3, was a noted New York Rangers fan, having previously dated one of the players. Her Rangers pennant famously hung over her desk at the front of the squad room. Many episodes of Home Improvement included references to the Detroit Red Wings and in one episode, Tim and his neighbour Wilson are at a game when Wilson wins the door prize. Many Friends episodes also involve Joey, Chandler, and Ross attending New York Rangers games. While it is true they are Ranger fans, a Detroit Red Wings jersey can also be seen hanging below a goalie mask in Joey and Chandler's apartment in season two.

In an episode of The Simpsons, "Lisa on Ice", Bart is the star of his peewee hockey team, the Mighty Pigs, coached by Chief Wiggum. Lisa is eventually forced to become a goaltender on an opposing team—the Kwik-E-Mart Gougers, coached by Apu—to avoid a failing grade in gym, and she blossoms from a nervous wreck to an intimidating star. Eventually, the two teams play each other. Towards the end of the game, Bart is awarded a penalty shot, but before he shoots, he thinks of all his memories with Lisa. Lisa does this as well, and the two embrace each other. The episode finishes with the two teams tying each other and furious fans destroying the hockey arena. In another episode, Bart answers his teacher's personal ad and uses the picture of hockey great Gordie Howe.

The South Park episode "Stanley's Cup" centres around ice hockey; it features the Detroit Red Wings playing the Colorado Avalanche in Stanley's Cup final, where before third intermission score is 2-2. On their suggestion, the Avalanche team is replaced with children, who are brutally injured in the ensuing game. Also in the episode "It's Christmas in Canada", when the boys are in Canada, one of the members of the Canadian crowd is an ice hockey player, no doubt a reference to the popularity of the sport in Canada.

The FX show Rescue Me, starring Denis Leary, featured hockey games as an integral part of several episodes. Hockey Hall of Famers and former Boston Bruins forwards Cam Neely and Phil Esposito both appeared, with Esposito playing a recurring role. Leary's character plays for the FDNY hockey team.

The Fox TV series Bones incorporated ice-hockey into the show by guest-starring none other than Luc Robitaille himself. "Lucky Luc" appears in a dream that Special Agent Seeley Booth has after being knocked out during a hockey game, and tells Booth to look at what "brings the team together." The show, titled "Fire in the Ice", had several elements of ice hockey, including a firefighters–federal agents hockey game, the murder victim a hockey player, and of course, "Lucky Luc".

At the end of one episode of Who's the Boss?, Tony and Angela are at a hockey game. Angela asks Tony what the red circle on the ice is for, and Tony indicates that it is blood (humorously furthering the stereotype of hockey violence). In Scrubs, Dr. Cox frequently wears a Detroit Red Wings jersey while not at the hospital; this is because of John C. McGinley's real-life friendship with Red Wings defenceman Chris Chelios. Joey from Full House also frequently wears Detroit Red Wings jerseys on the show, while his room is also decorated with several pieces of Detroit Red Wings decorations.

House M.D. is filled with reference to the sport. In the episode Distractions, the main character is described as not wanting to think of "the Flyers sucking", the series being set in New Jersey. No More Mr. Nice Guy has a scene in which House and Wilson drink in a bar, with a hockey game on TV in the background. In "Painless" both the patient and his son are hockey players. At the beginning of the episode "Unfaithful" a homeless man is offered a New York Rangers sweatshirt to which he jokingly responds "Are you crazy? We're here in Jersey". The cold opener of the season 8 episode "Perils of Paranoia" features an attorney knocking down an alibi by demonstrating that the defendant read about a New Jersey Devils game in the paper rather than watching it on TV. The same season has the episode "Transplant" in which House and Chi Park visit the room of a deceased patient, filled with Devils memorabilia. The patient of the episode "Gut Check" is a minor league hockey Enforcer.

In How I Met Your Mother, hockey is referenced several times to accentuate Robin Scherbatsky's Canadian side. In one episode, Robin goes on a date with Brad at a Canucks-Rangers game.

Actor Richard Dean Anderson has incorporated his personal love of hockey into two of his lead characters: the eponymous character in MacGyver, and Stargate SG-1's Jack O'Neill.

The Nickelodeon TV show, Big Time Rush, features four hockey players who leave Minnesota to go to L.A to become a pop band.

On one episode of Star Trek: Voyager, Tom Paris watches a hockey game on an old black & white TV set his wife replicated. He also had a hockey Holodeck program.

=== Canada ===
Because of hockey's huge popularity in Canada, it is considered one of the most important elements of Canadian pop culture. Hockey is central in homegrown television and movies such as the CBC Television series Hockey: A People's History and Hockeyville, the Global TV reality show Making The Cut: Last Man Standing, as well as scripted shows like CTV's Power Play (1998–2000) and Showcase's Rent-a-Goalie (2006–2008). In the Canadian animated series The Raccoons, ice hockey played a big role in the 1981 special "The Raccoons on Ice". CBC and its French language division, SRC, have made several entries into the He Shoots, He Scores franchise. The original series was filmed in both French and English, while subsequent series and movies have only been in French. The CBC premiered the hockey drama MVP in January 2008. Long-running Canadian comedy series The Red Green Show incorporated a hockey reference on each program as Red Green would end each show by saying, "Keep your stick on the ice." Television comedy series Letterkenny, a production of Crave and Bell Media, prominently featured ice hockey. Letterkenny creator Jared Keeso went on to helm the hockey-specific spinoff series Shoresy. In the show, Keeso plays the eponymous Shoresy, captain of the fictional Sudbury Blueberry Bulldogs. Critics have remarked on Shoresy's authenticity to both the sport and those who participate in it. Letterkenny director Jacob Tierney headed the TV adaptation of Heated Rivalry, an ice hockey romance series based on the Game Changers book series by Rachel Reid. The series premiered on Crave and HBO Max in November 2025 to widespread acclaim for its portrayal of a gay relationship between two hockey players as well as its attention to the realities of homophobia in the sport.

=== Sweden ===
Beartown, a television adaptation of the Fredric Backman novel of the same name, premiered on HBO Nordic in 2020. The five-episode miniseries focuses on a rural, hockey-centric town in Northern Sweden and the fallout that occurs when the star player of the local junior hockey team is accused of sexual assault. The series was praised for its examination of toxic masculinity and herd mentality within the sport. It was later released on HBO Max in North America in 2021.

=== Japan ===
The Fuji TV-produced drama Pride (2004) centred on Satonaka Haru, played by Takuya Kimura, whose life revolves around ice hockey and dreams of moving to Canada to play in the NHL.

=== United Kingdom ===
In the UK a Pingu episode called "Pingu Plays Ice Hockey" was produced in 1989 which featured Pingu, Robby, Pongi, and various hockey players.

== Comics ==
Charles Schulz's character Snoopy is well known for his love of ice hockey. Snoopy's Home Ice (Redwood Empire Ice Arena in Santa Rosa, California) continues to host the annual Snoopy's Senior World Hockey Tournament each year.

In the Peanuts comic strip, the gang would play ice hockey during the winter months, usually on outdoor ponds. Snoopy would occasionally join his human friends on the ice (once drawing a two-minute penalty for kissing Lucy on the nose during the face-off). In the off-season, Snoopy would sometimes "skate" barefooted atop his doghouse, wielding his hockey stick, and fantasizing about winning the Stanley Cup. Linus, watching from below, would be the "hockey fans". In one strip, Linus challenges Snoopy: "Prove to me that you're a real hockey player." Snoopy grins, revealing that several of his front teeth have been knocked out. Linus walks away, convinced. In later years, Snoopy would play ice hockey with his bird pal Woodstock and his bird friends, using a frozen birdbath as the skating rink.

Youth hockey is celebrated in cartoons and comic strips such as Small Saves.

Canadian comic book artist Jeff Lemire created the series Essex County, set in his hometown. The series frequently makes reference to ice hockey and features several characters who play the game.

Two major manga series have been published with ice hockey as their central focus: Go!! Southern Ice Hockey Club by Kōji Kumeta and Go Ahead by Daisuke Higuchi.

The webcomic called The Downward Spirals stars a team of anonymous hockey-playing opossums as they compete in the Meadow Hockey League.

The webcomic Check, Please! stars former junior figure skating champion Eric "Bitty" Bittle starting his freshman year playing hockey at the prestigious Samwell University in Samwell, Massachusetts. The comic follows all four of his years at Samwell University and in later comics also features the fictional NHL team the Providence Falconers due to Bitty's romantic relationship with Jack Zimmermann who signs to the team after graduating college.

In issue 6 of Wolverine: First Class, Wolverine is shown to be a Calgary Flames fan.

== Music ==
Among the more famous hockey references in music is "The Hockey Song" by Canadian folk singer Stompin' Tom Connors. Warren Zevon is known for a hockey song called "Hit Somebody! (The Hockey Song)" from his 2002 album My Ride's Here. The song's title is in reference to the commonplace fights that tend to break out between players during games and tells the tale of Buddy, a Canadian farmboy turned hockey goon. "The Hockey Theme", the long-time theme music of Hockey Night in Canada (now the theme song for the NHL on TSN), has been described as "Canada's second national anthem".

There are several less well-known songs which either directly or indirectly feature hockey references and hockey teams, such as "Zamboni" (a reference to the machine used to resurface the ice between periods and after games) by the Gear Daddies; "Helmethead" by Great Big Sea, which details the romantic exploits of an AHL player; and "Time to Go" by the Dropkick Murphys, which references hockey directly, as well as the colours of Boston's NHL team, the Boston Bruins (black and gold).

Instrumental-only songs that have become associated with ice hockey include "Nutty" by The Ventures, itself likely based on the B. Bumble and the Stingers' earlier, and similar work Nut Rocker, as "Nutty" was used by television station WSBK-TV for their Boston Bruins telecast theme for over twenty years, and was used later for some years by NESN for their Bruins telecasts, and "Brass Bonanza", used for the now-defunct Hartford Whalers NHL team's games at the start of a home game.

Canadian band The Tragically Hip has a number of songs that with hockey references, including "Fifty Mission Cap", about former Toronto Maple Leaf Bill Barilko, "Fireworks", and "Lonely End of the Rink". Their song "Wheat Kings" is not about hockey, but the Wheat Kings is the name of a hockey team in Brandon, Manitoba. In addition, "Heaven Is a Better Place Today" is a tribute to the late hockey player Dan Snyder.

The American rock group Five for Fighting's name is a hockey penalty reference chosen by singer John Ondrasik, who is an ice hockey fan. Also, L.A. hardcore band Donnybrook takes its name from a slang term referring to a fight between players during a hockey game.

The name of the Boston hardcore band Slapshot is an ice hockey reference, and they have taken this concept further with the album titles Sudden Death Overtime and Greatest Hits, Slashes and Crosschecks.

Jerry Only of New Jersey punk band The Misfits is a huge fan of the New York Rangers. The Misfits recorded the song "I Wanna Be a New York Ranger".

Swedish hardcore band 59 Times the Pain have recorded the song "2 Minutes remaining in the 3rd" on their album More Out of Today, a song explicitly talking about ice hockey; in their video clip for the song "More Out of Today", the singer of the band wears a Chicago Blackhawks jersey.

Canadian punk rock band Propagandhi have made numerous references to the sport in their lyrics, with ice hockey often being used as a political metaphor. The song "Dear Coaches Corner" on the album Supporting Caste urges Ron MacLean to offer an alternative political perspective for young hockey fans on Hockey Night in Canada as opposed to the militarism and patriotism encouraged by Don Cherry.

Canadian heavy metal band Anvil from Toronto, Ontario recorded the song "Blood On The Ice" in 1988, which first appeared on their studio 1988 album Pound For Pound and a year later on their live album Past and Present – Live in Concert. The song explicitly describes the aggressiveness and power of the game.

American power metal band Jag Panzer from Colorado Springs in 2001 recorded a song called "We've Got Another Cup Coming" in honor of then Stanley Cup winners Colorado Avalanche. The song was a cover of Judas Priest's "(You've Got) Another Thing Coming" with new lyrics about hockey.

Tom Waits, towards the end of his live 1975 album Nighthawks at the Diner, banters with the audience that it is time for him to "make like a hockey player and get the puck outta here".

The rapper Snoop Dogg, a noted hockey fan, wears jerseys from the AHL's Springfield Indians and the NHL's Pittsburgh Penguins on the music video for his 1994 single "Gin and Juice".

== See also ==
- Toronto Maple Leafs in popular culture
