= Jonathan Monro =

Canadian-American actor and singer

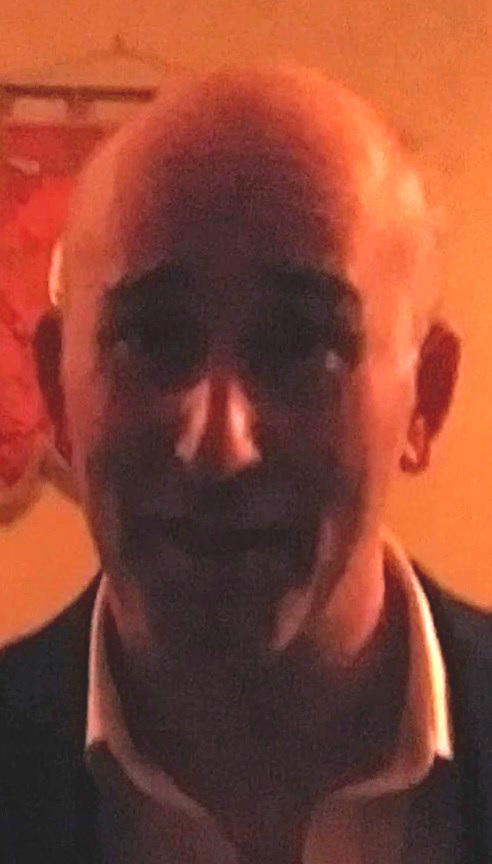
- Jonathan Monro
- Born: Jonathan Luke Weiser; June 6, 1974 (age 52)
- Occupations: Actor, writer, composer, pianist, singer, musical director

Jonathan Luke Weiser Monro (born Jonathan Luke Weiser, June 6, 1974) is a Canadian-American actor, pianist, musical director, singer, composer, and lyricist. His first major appearance was as a pianist at Carnegie Recital Hall in New York City in 1991.

== Personal life ==
Jonathan grew up in St. John's, Newfoundland. His father, David Weiser (formerly a traveling salesman from Montreal) co-founded the Newfoundland Traveling Theatre Company in 1972. The company gave a start to many of today's Canadian stars: Mary Walsh, Andy Jones, Cathy Jones, Greg Malone, Robert Joy, and the late Tommy Sexton. He retired from the company in 1976 to pursue his own wholesale and retail business. Jonathan's mother, Susan Weiser (née Susan Tilley), was a swimming coach. Jonathan has one sister, Andrea Monro, who is a professional singer/songwriter and pastry chef. Jonathan attended Holy Heart of Mary High School in St. John's, and Arizona State University where he studied classical piano with Robert Hamilton. Unfortunately, his trajectory was cut short in 1994 (see career). He tried to continue with piano at Memorial University of Newfoundland in 1994–1995, but switched to the musical theatre program at Sheridan College in Oakville, Ontario from 1995 to 1997.

Jonathan lived in Toronto and New York between 1997 and 2015, and currently resides in Montreal, where he continues his work as a freelance artist, while attending university full time.

== Career ==
Jonathan's first pursuit was piano, and he made his first major appearance at Carnegie Recital Hall in New York City at the age of 16. In April 1993, he won third prize in the Johanna Hodges International Piano Competition in Palm Springs, California. The following year, as he was preparing for the Tchaikovsky Competition in Moscow, he began experiencing blackouts and seizures while playing and even listening to classical piano music. He was forced to quit, and decided to pursue theatre. In an interview, he was quoted as saying,

"I always had a suspicion that theatre was my first love. My body proved that suspicion. It was deeply upsetting, but I have faith that the hours spent at the piano will someday pay off.".

Two years later, in 1997, Jonathan made his professional theatre debut at the Stratford Shakespeare Festival of Canada in Camelot, The Taming of the Shrew, and Coriolanus. That year, he won the Louis Applebaum Tyrone Guthrie Award for his musical contribution to the festival. He returned the following year, furthering his classical theatre studies in the John Sullivan Hayes Training Program, and traveled with the Stratford Festival to New York, where he made his Broadway debut in The Miser and Much Ado About Nothing.

Since then, Jonathan has starred/been featured in over 100 productions for stage, radio, TV and film, and has appeared in almost every regional theatre in Canada, and in many in the United States. His first large role in a film was in Heyday!, by Gordon Pinsent, which won a Silver Hugo Award at the Chicago Film Festival. the original Canadian cast of The Producers, and starred in the North American premiere of Glorious.

As a composer, lyricist, and librettist, Jonathan has written over forty original pieces for theatre, film, and TV. Calgary Sun theatre critic Louis B. Hobson wrote in one of his reviews: "Monro deserves to be compared to such giants as Sondheim and Lehrer". His most recent work is a musical adaptation of The Hockey Sweater, based on the iconic short story by Roch Carrier, co-written with Emil Sher, and directed by Donna Feore. The Hockey Sweater played to sold out houses in Montreal (Segal Centre) and Ottawa (National Arts Centre). Other notable works include the score for the feature film A Christmas Fury, starring Mary Walsh (CBC), the World Premieres of AfterImage, and Fear of Flight (which was featured at the Cultural Olympiad in Vancouver, February 2010). His first musical, Variations on a Nervous Breakdown, won four Betty Mitchell Awards (including two for Monro).

As a musical director, Jonathan has worked on over thirty productions, including the World Premiere of Alan Menken and David Spencer's The Apprenticeship of Duddy Kravitz, directed by Austin Pendleton, for which he subsequently co-produced the Original Cast Recording, the North American Premiere of Piaf/Dietrich (Mirvish Productions), the Canadian Premieres of Fun Home (Ovation Award Nomination), The Light in the Piazza (Betty Award Nomination), and Floyd Collins (Jessie Award Nomination), both with scores by his composition mentor, Adam Guettel.

Jonathan is currently the musical director for the Toronto production of Piaf/Dietrich (Mirvish), and his new play, "Nothing in Between", will soon enter the workshop phase.
