= 2017 Westmount municipal election =

← 2013	4 November 2017	2021 →

8 seats in Westmount City Council
Incumbent Mayor
Christina Smith
Independent

Municipal elections were held in the city of Westmount, Quebec, Canada on 4 November 2017 as part of the 2017 Quebec municipal elections. Voters elected 8 positions on the Westmount City Council, as well as one mayor. On October 5, returning City Councillor Philip A. Cutler and newcomer Jeff Shamie were acclaimed.

== Election Notes ==
Cynthia Lulham was elected for a 7th term, extending her record as the longest serving council member. 6 of the 8 councillors were newcomers, with only Cutler and Lulham (along with Mayor Smith) returning.

== Mayor ==
Candidate	Vote	%
Patrick Martin	1,878	31.2
Christina M. Smith (incumbent)	3,619	60.1
Beryl Wajsman	528	8.8
Result: Christina M. Smith

== Westmount City Council Candidates ==
=== District 1 ===
Candidate	Vote	%
Anitra Bostock	259	42.6
Antonio D'amico	255	41.9
Kirk Polymenakos	94	15.5
Result: Anitra Bostock

=== District 2 ===
Candidate	Vote	%
Philip A. Cutler (incumbent)	Acclaimed	-
Result: Philip A. Cutler

=== District 3 ===
Candidate	Vote	%
Jeff Shamie	Acclaimed	-
Result: Jeff Shamie

=== District 4 ===
Candidate	Vote	%
Rosalind Davis (Incumbent)	372	42.8
Conrad Peart	497	57.2
Result: Conrad Peart

=== District 5 ===
Candidate	Vote	%
Marina Brzeski	398	45.1
Elaine Carsley	33	3.7
Gabriel Felcarek	89	10.1
Christian Matossian	362	41
Result: Marina Brzeski

=== District 6 ===
Candidate	Vote	%
George Fourniotis	63	8
Mary Gallery	597	75.8
Joanne Wallace	128	16.2
Result: Mary Gallery

=== District 7 ===
Candidate	Vote	%
Cynthia Lulham (Incumbent)	424	54.90
Johanna Stosik	349	45.1
Result: Cynthia Lulham

=== District 8 ===
Candidate	Vote	%
Kathleen Kez	325	50.2
Theodora Samiotis (Incumbent)	322	49.8
Result: Kathleen Kez

Preceded by 2013	Westmount municipal elections	Succeeded by 2021
