= Snow Cat =

Snow Cat may refer to:

- Snowcat, a truck-sized tracked snow vehicle
- Tucker Sno-Cat, a family of tracked vehicles for snow conditions
- Snow leopard, a large cat native to the mountain ranges of central Asia
- Snow Cat (Transformers), a character from the Transformers: Energon cartoon series
- Snow Cat, a book by Dayal Kaur Khalsa and an animated adaptation of the same name
