= I Want a Dog =

1987 picture book by Dayal Kaur Khalsa

- Author: Dayal Kaur Khalsa
- Illustrator: Dayal Kaur Khalsa
- Cover artist: Khalsa
- Language: English
- Subject: Pets, Dogs
- Genre: Children's book
- Publisher: Tundra Books
- Publication date: 1987
- Publication place: United States
- Pages: 24
- ISBN: 0-88776-326-X

I Want a Dog is a children's book written and illustrated by Dayal Kaur Khalsa, originally published by Tundra Books and Clarkson N. Potter in 1987. The cover painting of the original book, which was also featured in the film version, is based on Sunday Afternoon on the Island of La Grande Jatte by Georges Seurat. The book's main character was named after May Cutler, founder of its Canadian publisher, Tundra.

== Plot synopsis ==
May wants a dog more than anything else in the world, and, at school, often imagines that everyone in her class are dogs too. But no matter how much she wants one, her parents often say no to the offer.

One day, May tries to show them her such determination by luring, with salami, a pack of ten dogs to her home. But her mother wants them returned, and some time later, May buys a puppy for her mother's birthday using all of her allowance. It does not work to plan, and that same evening, May's parents discuss the trials and tribulations of raising dogs as pets.

Still, as to May having a dog of her own, both of them object, and this leads to their daughter throwing her toys all over her room in outrage. It is not long before May sees one of her white rollerskates roll down the nearby staircase like a dog, which gives her an idea: along with a self-built training course, she can train that skate just like she would a real dog! Her school friends, hearing of her idea and amused at first, want to try walking it.

Another day, May arrives at the neighbourhood luncheonette to check out the newest comic books, leaving her skate outside. Little does she know that her "dog" is being interrogated by a real one! The latter runs away with it, and afterwards, May panics about its whereabouts. With her "try, try again" attitude, she is reunited with the skate by finding it nearby.

In time to come, May and the rollerskate become friends, and the craze as such is catching on with children all over her community. The biggest surprise of all, at the end of the story, is when she finally receives a real dog from her parents as a reward for her hard work.

== Reception ==
Kirkus Reviews wrote "An excellent read-aloud, this tribute to undaunted independence might be even better for independent reading." while Publishers Weekly found "Bright, busy paintings and a sympathetic narrative depict canine-coveting May's solution to her parents' ban on pets." Books in Canada called it "delightfully outrageous".

== Film version ==
The 2003 animated short based on the book was directed by Sheldon Cohen. Much of the animation and plot is faithful to Khalsa's original work. The songs in the film version are sung by indie singer-songwriter Neko Case.

== See also ==
- "I Want a Dog" is also the title of a Pet Shop Boys song, which can now be found on their b-side collection Alternative.
