= May Cutler =

Canadian publisher, politician (1923–2011)

Mayor of Westmount, Quebec
- In office 1987–1991
- Preceded by: Brian Gallery
- Succeeded by: Peter Trent

Personal details
- Born: September 4, 1923 Montreal, Quebec, Canada
- Died: March 3, 2011 (aged 87) Montreal, Quebec, Canada
- Profession: Publisher

May Ebbitt Cutler (September 4, 1923 – March 3, 2011) was a Canadian writer, journalist, playwright, and publisher. She founded Tundra Books in her home in 1967, becoming Canada's first female publisher of children's books. She served a four-year term as the first female mayor of Westmount, Quebec from 1987 to 1991. As a writer of "literary works" she used the pseudonym Ebbitt Cutler.

== Life and career ==
=== Early life ===
May Ebbitt was born in the east end of Montreal in 1923. Her parents, Francis (née Farrelly) and William Henry Ebbitt, a police officer, were Irish immigrants. She had two older brothers, William "Bill" Ebbitt and Jack Ebbitt. In 1953 she married Phil Cutler, a Canadian labour lawyer and Quebec Superior Court judge, who died in 1987. The couple had four sons – Keir, Adam and Michael, who are twins, and Roger.

Cutler earned both her Bachelor of Arts and her Master of Arts degrees from McGill University in Montreal. She next obtained a second Master of Arts in journalism from Columbia University in New York City.

=== Early career ===
Cutler worked for the newly formed United Nations following her graduation from Columbia University. When she returned to Canada she became a columnist and reporter for the former Montreal Herald. She also wrote magazine articles for the former Montreal Standard. She was the second woman hired by the Canadian Press news agency.

She would later join the faculty of McGill University, where she founded a three-year curriculum program for journalism.

=== Tundra Books ===
Cutler founded Tundra Books in 1967, using first-prize money won by her biographical novella The Last Noble Savage in the Canadian Centennial Commission Publications Assistance Competition. Thus she became the first Canadian woman publisher of children's books. She owned and operated Tundra Books for more than 28 years. For Tundra she openly sought writers and artists to create children's books. She was the first publisher to release works by Stéphane Poulin, a French-language illustrator and writer; Dayal Kaur Khalsa, author of I Want a Dog and several other titles; and William Kurelek, who released A Prairie Boy's Winter and They Sought a New World through Tundra Books. Beside books for children, Cutler also published some by architect Moshe Safdie and some by novelist Roch Carrier, including The Hockey Sweater.

Cutler successfully guided Tundra Books through financial difficulties, as well as the death of her husband in 1987, which coincided with her political campaign for mayor of Westmount. She sold Tundra to the McClelland & Stewart publishing firm in 1998.

Cutler published some of her own writings, beginning with her 1967 prize-winning novella as by Ebbitt Cutler, The Last Noble Savage: A Laurentian Idyll. She also penned a musical, two theatrical plays and a biography of Kurelek entitled Breaking Free: The Story of William Kurelek.

=== Mayor of Westmount ===
Cutler decided to enter politics in 1987 following several personal and professional disagreements with the local government. The city council of Westmount had refused her request for a zoning change which would have allowed Tundra Books' headquarters to move to the street-level floor of Sherbrooke Street which she had purchased even though the space permitted "professional" use. She announced her candidacy for mayor in 1987, her first political campaign, and defeated the incumbent Brian Gallery, becoming the first female mayor of the city. Gallery later praised Cutler's handling of the transition of power, saying, "She was listening, she asked good questions ... I walked away from our chat thinking she'll be a good friend. The keys to the city will be in very good hands." Montreal city councilman Marvin Rotrand noted that Cutler's election "marked a sea change from the clannish, traditional way that Westmount had always been run."

Cutler served one four-year term, declining to run for re-election in 1991 and asking then city councilman Peter Trent to run for the office. (Trent was elected that year, served until 2001 when Westmount merged with Montreal, and was elected again in 2009.) Her main accomplishment as mayor launching a campaign to renovate the Westmount Public Library from a rundown building into a state-of-the-art modern library, which was realized shortly after she left office.

=== Later life ===
Cutler completed her dream to visit every continent when she traveled to Antarctica in 2010. The six-week trip by boat from Miami and down the west coast of South America took its toll on her health and she returned to Montreal with a heart condition. She died at home in Montreal on March 3, 2011, at the age of 87, after being hospitalized in February. She had suffered from several illnesses. Upon her death, she had asked that her body be donated to McGill University Medicine for medical studies.

Cutler was survived by her four sons and six grandchildren. Her oldest grandson, Philip A. Cutler, was elected to the Westmount city council in November 2013; "just turned 25", he became "likely the youngest-ever councillor".
