= Jorge Enrique Lage =

Cuban novelist and short story writer

Jorge Enrique Lage (Havana, 1979) is a Cuban novelist and short story writer. He was the editor of the magazine El cuentero and the publishing house Caja China of the Onelio Jorge Cardoso Literary Training Center. He also worked as an editor for Hypermedia Magazine.

Jorge Enrique Lage is the grandson of Iris Davila, a famous Cuban radio-plays novelist. Formed as a biochemist at Universidad de la Habana (1999–2003), he quit the biosciences right after graduating with honors to pursue a career as a writer. Science fiction has been a recurring genre in his work.

Lage is considered one the most singular voices of his generation. His stories have appeared in anthologies and magazines in Cuba and abroad. He is associated with Generation 0, a designation used to refer to a group of Cuban writers and artists who began publishing around the year 2000. The group was associated, among others, with writers such as Orlando Luis Pardo Lazo, Ahmel Echevarría, Legna Rodríguez Iglesias, Jamila Medina Ríos, Lizabel Mónica, and Osdany Morales. The category has been the subject of discussion among the writers themselves and among critics. In an interview published in The Irish Times, Lage explained that the name "Generation 0" emerged as a way of making visible the positions of a group of writers who were beginning to publish at that time.

== Narrative Style and Themes ==
In 2021, the Argentine researcher Katia Viera published an extensive interview with Lage in CELEHIS: Revista del Centro de Letras Hispanoamericanas, published by the National University of Mar del Plata, in which she presents him as one of the prominent and unsettling writers of recent Cuban fiction. The interview addresses his literary career, his ideas about writing, and his relationship with the Cuban literary tradition. The representation of Havana is one of the principal subjects of critical scholarship on Lage. In Nuevos sentidos para una ficción habanera. Jorge Enrique Lage: La(s) Habana(s) del porvenir, published by the Institute of Hispanic American Literature at the University of Buenos Aires, Viera analyzes the ways in which Lage's fiction reconfigures the city and proposes new forms of representing Havana within contemporary Cuban literature. This line of research continued with the study Radicantes en una ciudad de culto. Personajes de Jorge Enrique Lage, published in 2024 in the University of the Andes journal Perífrasis. In relation to Carbono 14. Una novela de culto, Viera analyzes the configuration of Havana through its characters, whom she interprets as mobile and deterritorialized subjects who exchange and translate cultural references originating in different spaces. Carbono 14 and Vultureffect have also been studied from the perspective of Cuban science fiction and speculative fiction. Rachel Price's essay "Planet/Cuba: On Jorge Enrique Lage's Carbono 14: Una novela de culto and Vultureffect" was originally published in La Habana Elegante and was subsequently included as a bibliographical reference in The Cambridge History of Cuban Literature, in the chapter devoted to Cuban detective, speculative, and graphic fiction. The novel Archivo has likewise generated studies focusing on its fragmentary structure, its relationship with memory, and its representation of Cuban identity. In the article "Archivo: 'Vivir en el interior de una memoria portátil'", the writer and researcher Lizabel Mónica argues that the novel breaks with conventional literary structure and uses the form of the archive to explore the relationships between personal memory, collective memory, citizenship, civil society, and the nation. The study also highlights the use of figures such as the ghost, the zombie, the double, and the cyborg, alongside representations of the queer body and the figure of the spy. Critical interest in Archivo also appears in the work of researcher Elena Lahr-Vivaz, who, in her book Writing Islands: Space and Identity in the Transnational Cuban Archipelago, considers Lage's novel to be a representative work of the cultural and political transformations experienced by Cuban space during the period from 2014 to 2020. The compilation of short stories Vultureffect has also been the subject of critical approaches. In "Intervenciones desde la ligereza. Notas sobre escritura y política en Osdany Morales y Jorge Enrique Lage", Lage's poetics are analyzed through the figure of the vulture and the appropriation of remnants of media culture, particularly television and the Internet. The study interprets this strategy as part of a form of writing that works with cultural materials regarded as residual or disposable. The novel Everglades has also received critical attention. Katia Viera analyzes it as a continuation of techniques present in Lage's earlier works and highlights its use of fantastic and surrealist elements to address the conditions of the present rather than limiting itself to the predictive representation of the future associated with certain forms of science fiction. Lage's association with Generation Zero has also been the subject of academic research. Studies by Katia Viera place his work within debates concerning Cuban writers who began publishing around the turn of the century and examine the relationships between these authors, the literary workshops of the late 1990s, and subsequent transformations in Cuban fiction. Critical reception of Lage's work also extends to international cultural and literary publications. Interviews and essays published in Latin American Literature Today have addressed in particular his relationship with science fiction, narrative experimentation, and the translation of his work into English.

== Works ==
Short story books

- Yo fui un adolescente ladrón de tumbas (Ediciones Extramuros, 2004)
- Fragmentos encontrados en La Rampa (Casa Editora Abril, 2004)
- Los ojos de fuego verde (Casa Editora Abril, 2005)
- El color de la sangre diluida (Letras Cubanas, 2007)
- Vultureffect (Unión, 2011)

Novels

- Carbono 14, una novela de culto (Altazor, Perú, 2010).
- La Autopista: the Movie (Caja China, Cuba, 2014).
- Archivo (Hypermedia, Miami, 2015).
- Everglades (Hypermedia, Miami, 2020).
- Cuba Científica (Contrabando, España, 2025)

== Translations and international publications ==
Lage's short stories have appeared in anthologies published outside Cuba. These include "Bitches", included in McSweeney's 46: Thirteen Crime Stories from Latin America, and "Epílogo con superhéroe y Fidel", included in Cuba in Splinters: Eleven Stories from the New Cuba, published by OR Books in 2014. His novel La autopista: the movie was translated into English as Freeway: La Movie and published by Deep Vellum Press in 2022.

== Awards ==
Jorge Enrique Lage has won numerous awards, including:

- Celestino de Cuento Award (2002)
- Luis Rogelio Nogueras Award (2003)
- Calendario Award, in Narrative (2003)
- Calendario Award, in Science Fiction (2004)
