= Carbono 14 =

2010 novel by Jorge Enrique Lage

Carbono 14: Una novela de culto
- Author: Jorge Enrique Lage
- Language: Spanish
- Genre: Science Fiction Novel
- Publisher: Ediciones Altazor
- Publication date: 2010
- Publication place: Cuba
- Pages: 190
- ISBN: 978-959-10-1845-8

Carbono 14. Una novela de culto is a novel by the Cuban writer Jorge Enrique Lage, first published in 2010 by Ediciones Altazor in Lima, Peru. The novel combines elements of speculative fiction, science fiction, fantasy, detective fiction and popular culture in order to construct a displaced and futuristic representation of Havana. Researchers have emphasized its treatment of Havana, the displacement of its characters, and its combination of literary genres with narrative elements associated with international popular culture.

== Plot ==
The novel presents a transformed and futuristic version of Havana. One of its central characters is Evelyn, a young extraterrestrial female who arrives in the city after being expelled from a planet called Cuba following an explosion. Evelyn carries a periodic table, and her arrival introduces a series of events linking Havana's urban space with elements of science fiction and popular culture. Lage simultaneously develops other characters, including the Vulture and JE, an alter ego of the author. The novel employs a fragmented structure in which different narrative lines and cultural registers overlap. One of the central elements of the plot is a mechanism associated with carbon-14. The novel also incorporates clones, androids and ghosts, together with references to objects, characters and situations drawn from different areas of contemporary culture. The novel's titular device is a fictional carbon-14 dating device used by JE to determine the age of everyday objects. Catalina Quesada Gómez argues that this device contributes to the novel's disarticulation of Havana and its transformation into an unreal space.

== Critical Reception ==
Carbono 14 combines techniques associated with different narrative genres by incorporating elements of science fiction and speculative fiction alongside devices drawn from detective oriented narratives and pulp fiction. The classification of the work as science fiction has not been uniform among its critics. Some scholarly studies and journalistic accounts have placed it within dystopian or speculative fiction, while others have argued that Lage does not employ science fiction according to its traditional conventions, but rather as a means of distorting elements of contemporary reality. The combination of registers produces a narrative in which recognizable elements of Cuban reality appear alongside fantastic or futuristic situations. Viera has related this result to a tendency in contemporary Cuban narrative to employ estrangement and displacement in representing national experience. The Havana of Carbono 14 does not function as a realistic reproduction of the city. The narrative alters its spatial and temporal coordinates and combines it with elements drawn from other imaginary worlds. Studies of recent Cuban narrative have described this representation as an uncanny, diffuse and delocalized Havana. The transformation of the name Cuba into that of a planet is one of the central devices through which the novel alters the conventional relationship between territory, nation and identity. Critics have interpreted this displacement as part of a broader tendency in contemporary Cuban literature to question traditional representations of national space. The novel incorporates references and devices associated with several genres of popular culture. Critics have pointed to the presence of elements associated with B movies and detective fiction, as well as the use of parody and absurdity. Gilberto Padilla mentions the inclusion of clones, androids, ghosts and characters and situations drawn from different areas of contemporary popular culture. Rafael Rojas similarly discusses Carbono 14 as part of a body of recent Cuban fiction that uses parody, pastiche, hyperbole and the juxtaposition of different cultural registers. He identifies traces of the literary methods of Guillermo Cabrera Infante and Reinaldo Arenas in Lage's treatment of the city, language and popular culture. Rachel Price has studied Carbono 14 together with Vultureffect in relation to the transformation of the idea of Cuba into a planetary and speculative space. The novel has also been included in broader studies of Cuban literature. The Cambridge History of Cuban Literature includes Carbono 14 in its discussion of detective fiction, speculative fiction and graphic novels. While some critics have described the novel as dystopian or speculative, others have argued that its procedure consists less in constructing a coherent future than in producing a distortion of recognizable reality. Javier L. Mora describes the novel as "a machine designed to dismantle the weariness of reality, within a parodic framework that explains it without excess or whining" Carbono 14, has also been discussed by Lourdes Molina among contemporary Cuban speculative and cyberpunk writing.

== Editions ==
The first edition of Carbono 14. Una novela de culto was published in 2010 by Ediciones Altazor in Lima, Peru. A Cuban edition of the novel was published by Letras Cubanas in Havana in 2012, this latest edition has 190 pages.

== See also ==
- Cuban literature
- Jorge Enrique Lage
