= Eaton's catalogue =

Canadian department store catalogue

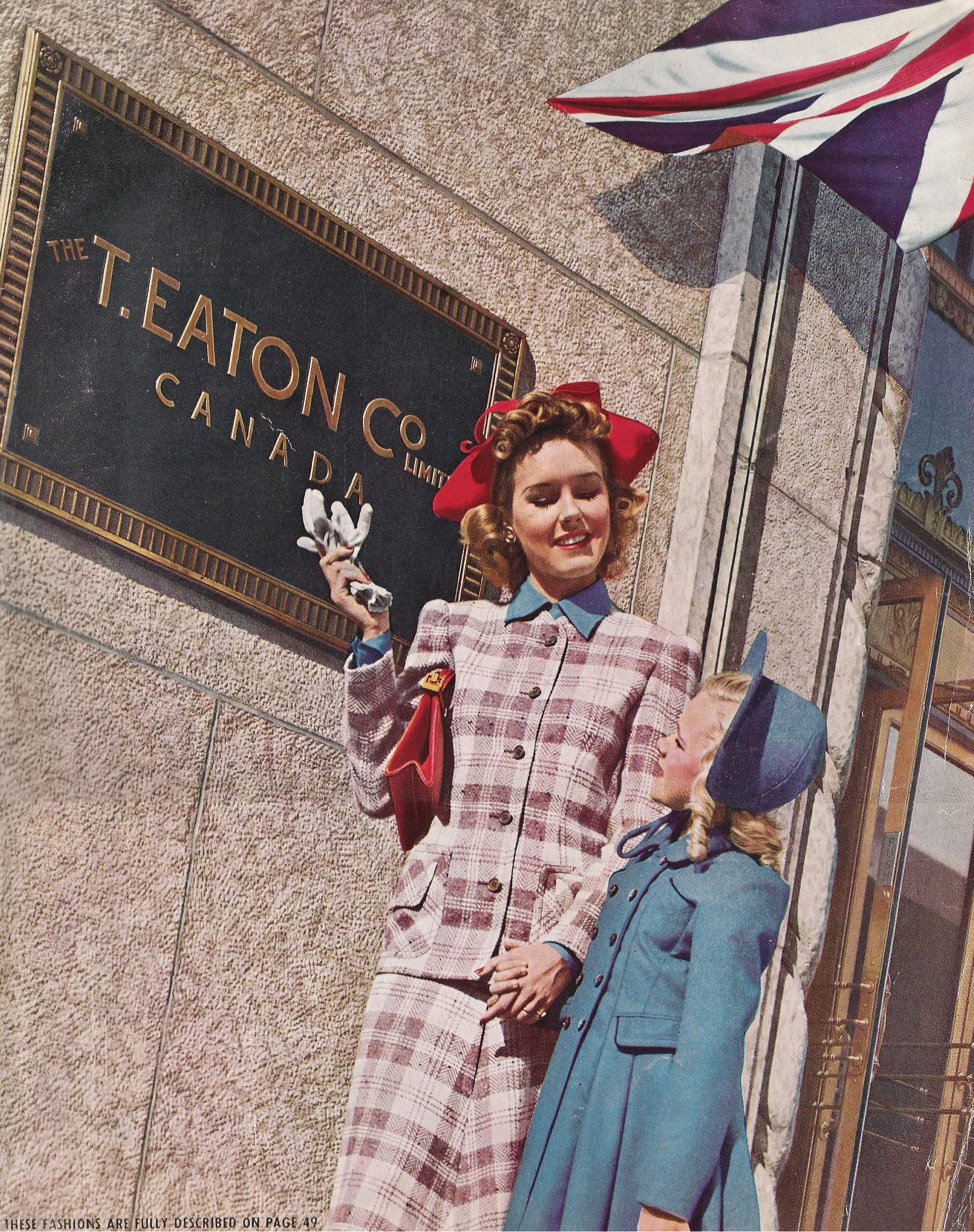
Front cover of Eaton's Spring and Summer Catalogue 1942

The Eaton's catalogue was a mail-order catalogue published by Eaton's from 1884 to 1976. It was "one of the first to be distributed by a Canadian retail store".

The first version of the catalogue was a 32-page booklet handed out at the Industrial Exhibition (now the Canadian National Exhibition). Within twelve years, the company's mail-order department was filling over 200,000 orders per year. Eaton's actively sought out new subscribers, particularly in rural areas, by employing such tactics as offering gifts for the contact information of non-subscribers.

There was initially only an English version of the catalogue; the first French version was published in 1910, and began to be regularly distributed in 1927. However, customers could place orders in French as of 1902, though they could not use the provided forms to do so. Additions to the earliest versions of the catalogue included illustrations in 1887 (the first catalogues were text-only), colour in 1915, and photographs in 1919. The first mail-order office was in Toronto, but additional offices were opened in Winnipeg in 1905 and Moncton in 1918.

Early catalogues sold clothing almost exclusively, though operations gradually expanded to include such products as pharmaceuticals, books, furniture, china, farm tools, and whole pre-fabricated houses.

The Eaton's catalogue has been featured in multiple works of Canadian literature, including The Hockey Sweater and Anne's House of Dreams. The publication itself was used to teach literacy in some classrooms. In Western Canada, the catalogue was dubbed the "Homesteader's Bible" or the "Family Bible". This "Canadian symbol" was used for such diverse purposes as shin pads, home insulation, and outhouse toilet paper.

The catalogue ceased publication in January 1976.
