= Volkswagen Blues =

1984 novel by Jacques Poulin

- Author: Jacques Poulin
- Language: French
- Genre: Road Novel
- Publisher: Québec-Amérique
- Publication date: 1984
- Publication place: Canada
- Media type: Print (Paperback)
- Pages: 323 pages
- OCLC: 17173838

Volkswagen Blues is a French-language road novel by French-Canadian writer Jacques Poulin, his sixth, originally published by Québec-Amérique in 1984.

Inspired by the writings of Jack Kerouac and the Beat Generation poets, some of whom appear in the book's later chapters, the novel explores the American landscape and cultural history from the vantage point of the open road, using writers, historical figures, popular music and art as tropes to orient the reader and tell the story of America.

== Plot ==
Volkswagen Blues begins with its protagonist, a middle-aged, formerly successful writer from Quebec, who has adopted the ironic pen-name Jack Waterman (a metonymy playing on Waterman pens), experiencing a bout of writer's block. Having discovered an old postcard, Jack embarks on a quest to reconnect with its sender, his long-lost, rambling brother, Théo. Early into the narrative, Jack picks up a hitchhiker, a young Métisse woman, nicknamed "La Grande Sauterelle" due her long, grasshopper-like legs, as a travel companion, as well as a cat named Chop Suey.

Together in Jack's Volkswagen Minibus, which through personification becomes a character in the story, they travel from Gaspé to San Francisco, passing through Toronto, Detroit, Chicago, St. Louis, Kansas City and the American West along their way, exploring the history of European contact with the native people of the Americas. While on the road, they discuss language, literature, music, expansionism, the Oregon Trail, etc., and their trip becomes an allegory for the history of the French exploration of North America. At the same time, La Grande Sauterelle, who is struggling with her own identity, presents another version of American history, as recounted by indigenous peoples, where "discovery" is viewed as "invasion." Throughout the episodic novel a number of interesting and entertaining characters appear, including journalists, museum directors, railroad hoboes and writers such as Saul Bellow and Lawrence Ferlinghetti, as well as the spirit of Jimmie Rodgers, Ernest Hemingway, John Muir and the Beat Generation.

Jack's journey through an America that scholar Paul Socken describes as a "lost paradise" is one of disillusionment and self-discovery that allows him to break through the impasse he had met in his writing.

== Reception ==
Volkswagen Blues was nominated for the Governor General's Award for French-language fiction at the 1984 Governor General's Awards and was one of the selected novels in the 2005 edition of Canada Reads, where it was championed by author and former National Librarian of Canada, Roch Carrier.

Volkswagen Blues was individually cited when Jacques Poulin was awarded the Prix Gilles-Corbeil (informally known as the "Nobel québécois").

== Translations ==
Volkswagen Blues was translated into English by Sheila Fischman and published by McClelland & Stewart in 1988 and subsequently re-issued by Cormorant Books in 2002.
