= Jacklight =

1984 poetry collection by Louise Erdrich

- First edition
- Author: Louise Erdrich
- Language: English
- Genre: Poetry
- Publisher: Holt, Rinehart and Winston
- Publication date: February 15, 1984
- Publication place: United States
- Media type: Paperback
- Pages: 85
- ISBN: 0-03-068682-2 (first edition); ISBN 0-8050-1047-5 (current)

Jacklight is a 1984 poetry collection by Louise Erdrich. The collection grew from poems Erdrich wrote for her 1979 Master of Arts thesis at Johns Hopkins University.

== Table of Contents ==
- Jacklight
  - "Jacklight"
- Runaways
  - "A Love Medicine"
  - "Family Reunion"
  - "Indian Boarding School: The Runaways"
  - "Dear John Wayne"
  - "Rugaroo"
  - "Francine's Room"
  - "The Lady in the Pink Mustang"
  - "Walking in the Breakdown Lane"
- Hunters
  - "The Woods"
  - "The Levelers"
  - "Train"
  - "Captivity"
  - "Chahinkapa Zoo"
  - "The King of Owls"
  - "Painting of a White Gate and Sky"
  - "Night Sky"
- The Butcher's Wife
  - "The Butcher's Wife"
  - "That Pull from the Left"
  - "Clouds"
  - "Shelter"
  - "The Slow Sting of Her Company"
  - "Here Is a Good Word for Step-and-a-Half Waleski"
  - "Portrait of the Town Leonard"
  - "Leonard Commits Redeeming Adulteries with All the Women in Town"
  - "Leonard Refuses to Atone"
  - "Unexpected Dangers"
  - "My Name Repeated on the Lips of the Dead"
  - "A Mother's Hell"
  - "The Book of Water"
  - "To Otto, in Forgetfulness"
  - "New Vows"
- Myths
  - "I Was Sleeping Where the Black Oaks Move"
  - "The Strange People"
  - "The Lefavor Girls"
  - "Three Sisters"
  - "Whooping Cranes"
  - "Old Man Potchikoo"
  - "The Birth of Potchikoo"
  - "Potchikoo Marries"
  - "How Potchikoo Got Old"
  - "The Death of Potchikoo"
  - "Windigo"
  - "The Red Sleep of Beasts"
  - "Turtle Mountain Reservation"
