= Susan Kerslake =

Canadian writer (born 1943)

- Born: 1943 (age 82–83); Chicago, Illinois, United States
- Occupations: novelist, short story writer
- Writing career
- Period: 1970s-2000s
- Notable works: Middlewatch, The Book of Fears

Susan Kerslake (born 1943) is a Canadian writer. She was a shortlisted nominee for the Books in Canada First Novel Award in 1976 for Middlewatch, and for the Governor General's Award for English-language fiction at the 1984 Governor General's Awards for The Book of Fears.

Born in Chicago, Illinois, Kerslake emigrated to Canada in 1966, residing in Halifax, Nova Scotia.

== Works ==
- Middlewatch (1976, ISBN 0-88750-206-7)
- Penumbra (1984, ISBN 0-920544-40-1)
- The Book of Fears (1984, ISBN 0-920304-31-1)
- Blind Date (1989, ISBN 0-919001-53-X)
- Seasoning Fever (2002, ISBN 0-88984-234-5)
