= 1984 Governor General's Awards =

Canadian literary award

Each winner of the 1984 Governor General's Awards for Literary Merit was selected by a panel of judges administered by the Canada Council for the Arts.

== English ==
Category	Winner	Nominated
Fiction	Josef Skvorecky, The Engineer of Human Souls	Timothy Findley, Not Wanted on the Voyage; Susan Kerslake, The Book of Fears; Audrey Thomas, Intertidal Life
Non-fiction	Sandra Gwyn, The Private Capital: Ambition and Love in the Age of Macdonald and Laurier	Bob Beal and Rod Macleod, Prairie Fire: The 1885 North-West Rebellion; Graham Fraser, P.Q.: René Lévesque and the Parti Québécois in Power
Poetry	Paulette Jiles, Celestial Navigation	Roo Borson, The Whole Night, Coming Home; Marilyn Bowering, The Sunday before Winter; David McFadden, The Art of Darkness; Sharon Thesen, Confabulations; Peter van Toorn, Mountain Tea
Drama	Judith Thompson, White Biting Dog	James Reaney, The Canadian Brothers or The Prophecy Fulfilled; George Ryga, A Letter to My Son

== French ==
Category	Winner	Nominated
Fiction	Jacques Brault, Agonie	Madeleine Ouellette-Michalska, La Maison Trestler; Jacques Poulin, Volkswagen Blues; Jacques Savoie, Les Portes tournantes; Marie José Thériault, Les Demoiselles de Numidie
Non-fiction	Jean Hamelin and Nicole Gagnon, Le XXe Siècle: Histoire du catholicisme québécois	Luc Bureau, Entre l'Éden et l'Utopie; Philippe Haeck, La Table d'écriture: poéthique et modernité
Poetry	Nicole Brossard, Double Impression	Michel Beaulieu, Kaléidoscope; André Roy, Les sept jours de la jouissance; Élise Turcotte, Navires de guerre
Drama	René-Daniel Dubois, Ne blâmez jamais les Bédouins	Gilbert Dupuis, Les Transporteurs de monde; Marcel Sabourin, Pleurer pour rire; Michel Tremblay, Albertine, en cinq temps
