= Freeway: La Movie =

2014 novel by Jorge Enrique Lage

- Author: Jorge Enrique Lage
- Translator: Lourdes Molina
- Language: Spanish, English
- Genre: Novel, science fiction, dystopian fiction
- Publisher: Ediciones Cajachina, Deep Vellum Publishing
- Publication date: 2014, 2022
- Publication place: Cuba, United States
- ISBN: 9781646051823

La autopista: The movie is a novel by Cuban writer Jorge Enrique Lage, first published in Havana by Ediciones Cajachina in 2014. In 2022, it was translated into English by Lourdes Molina under the title Freeway: La Movie. The translation ran by Deep Vellum Publishing in the United States. The novel has been discussed in relation to contemporary Cuban literature, science fiction, cyberpunk, globalization, and changing notions of Cuban territory and identity.

== Plot ==
La autopista: The movie is set in a fictional universe in which the construction of a gigantic highway radically transforms the Cuban urban landscape and the island's relationship with the outside world. The highway serves as one of the novel's central spatial structures and as a starting point for a narrative populated by characters, cultural references, and situations drawing on fantasy and speculative fiction. The protagonists are an unidentified narrator and his companion known as "the Autist". The novel's fragmented narrative follows their adventures as they encounter the Seminoles and start a search for a treasure apparently hidden by Philip K. Dick in the ruins of the Hard Rock Café Havana, followed by employment at a sex shop. Alongside these episodes runs a documentary-making subplot, in which the protagonists attempt to document the construction of the highway.

== Themes and style ==
The novel has been studied within the framework of science fiction and, in particular, in relation to Cuban cyberpunk. Walfrido Dorta discusses La autopista: The movie alongside Juan Abreu's Garbageland, arguing that Lage's novel questions and undermines certain generic conventions associated with cyberpunk and science fiction while incorporating elements of bizarro fiction. Ignacio Iriarte has also examined the novel alongside the films The Matrix and The Truman Show, focusing on the relationship between science fiction, power, and forms of government. His study places the novel within a broader consideration of how science fiction imagines the future in order to examine contemporary political conditions. Javier Rubio Manzano has examined the novel within the context of contemporary Cuban fiction and Caribbean science fiction. His study relates La autopista: The movie to globalization and to a representation of Havana that he calls "Post-Havana", characterized by the transformation and destabilization of traditional conceptions of the city and Cuban territory. Within this critical framework, the highway functions as an image of the movements and connections produced by the circulation of capital, people, and cultural products. Cuba is no longer represented solely through its condition as an island but is incorporated into a transnational and globalized space. The transformation of insular space is another aspect of the novel addressed by critics. Dunielys Díaz Hernández examines the reconfiguration of Cuban insular space in La autopista: the movie, arguing that the novel plays with the symbolic landscape of the island by cutting through it with a large highway and connecting it to continental shores. The study interprets the resulting blurring of boundaries between inside and outside through concepts of deterritorialization, heterotopia, and archipelagic space.

== Reception ==
Cuban writer Ahmel Echevarría highlighted the novel's combination of science fiction, satire, popular culture, politics, and formal experimentation by writing: “Lage’s prose is like a videogame console where the conventions of realism can be combined with those of other subgenres.” In Echevarría's reading, the novel moves away from a strictly conventional conception of science fiction and uses futuristic imagination to represent Cuba and Cubans from a temporal perspective which is displaced from the present time. Writing in the Complete Review, M. A. Orthofer described the novel as an unconventional but accessible work, characterizing it as a "freewheeling kind of ride" and praising its "amusing invention and sustained light touch". The review highlighted the novel's treatment of cultural, linguistic and commercial connections between Cuba and the United States, concluding that the book was "certainly enjoyable". The Modern Novel similarly emphasized the book's surrealism and absurdist humor, calling it "great fun", while cautioning that it was "clearly not to be taken too seriously". The Modern Novel similarly emphasized the book's surrealism and absurdist humor, describing the novel as "great fun", while cautioning that it was "clearly not to be taken too seriously".

In a review for NPR, Lily Meyer described Freeway: La Movie as a satirical, picaresque buddy comedy set in a dystopian Cuba, describing it as deliberately disorienting, and said that its episodic structure stretched conventional ideas of narrative. Meyer referred to the novel’s "political and pitch-black" humor, arguing that its willingness to address serious subjects through comedy gave the work an "angry energy".
