= Tundra Books =

Canadian publisher of children's books

- Parent company: Penguin Random House Canada
- Founded: 1967
- Founder: May Cutler
- Country of origin: Canada
- Headquarters location: Toronto
- Distribution: Penguin Random House
- Key people: Tara Walker
- Publication types: Books
- Official website: www.tundrabooks.com

Tundra Books is the oldest children's book publisher in Canada.

Tundra Books was founded in 1967 by May Cutler, a Montreal-based writer and editor. Cutler established the publishing company in the basement of her home, becoming the first woman to publish children's books in Canada. The U.S. division of the company, Tundra Books of Northern New York, was founded in 1971.

One of Tundra Books' best-selling titles has been the 1980 short story, The Hockey Sweater, which was written by Roch Carrier, published by May Cutler, and illustrated by filmmaker Sheldon Cohen. After 28 years, Tundra Books was sold to McClelland & Stewart. In 1996, Tundra Books' headquarters moved to Toronto from its former home in Westmount, Quebec, a suburb of Montreal, and a new publisher, Kathy Lowinger, took over.

In the late 2000s, Tundra reissued many children's titles, including Mordecai Richler's Jacob Two-Two books, The Olden Days Coat by Margaret Laurence, Monica Hughes' Isis trilogy, and Veronica Tennant's On Stage, Please. On May 15, 2007, Tundra Books celebrated its 40th anniversary.

On June 24, 2009, Kathy Lowinger announced her retirement as publisher of Tundra Books. No new publisher was named; instead, Kathryn Cole was promoted to editorial director and Alison Morgan was promoted to managing director. Company founder May Cutler died in March 2011.

On January 19, 2017, for their 50th anniversary, Tundra revealed their new logo designed by Frank Viva at Viva and Co. as well as the May Cutler Emerging Artist of the Year.
