= Dayal Kaur Khalsa =

American-Canadian children's book author

- Dayal Kaur Khalsa at her studio in Montreal in the 1980s
- Born: April 17, 1943; Queens, New York, U.S.
- Died: July 17, 1989 (aged 46); Vancouver, British Columbia, Canada
- Education: City College of New York
- Occupations: Author, illustrator

Dayal Kaur Khalsa (April 17, 1943 – July 17, 1989) was the American-born author and illustrator of numerous award-winning children's books. She moved to Canada in 1970, where she began her career. Over the span of four years before her death at the age of 46, she wrote and illustrated eight picture books, three of them published posthumously.

== Biography ==
Born Marcia Schonfeld in Queens, New York, she was raised primarily with her grandmother while both her parents worked. Her childhood formed the basis of her works, especially Tales of a Gambling Grandma. Her grandmother's death in 1951 when Khalsa was nine was devastating to her.

Khalsa graduated from the City College of New York in 1963 and attended the Art Students League of New York from 1964 to 1965. Though she still lived at home, Khalsa had a loft space in Lower Manhattan and associated with mutually influential avant-garde artists, teachers, and students, including Roy Lichtenstein and his friends. In 1966, her mother became ill with breast cancer. She died the following year.

Around the time of her mother's illness, Khalsa was active in the civil rights movement in New York and in the American South. Afterwards, she toured Mexico with her father, her brother and his wife, then stayed in San Miguel de Allende for a time with fellow artist Brian Grison.

In 1970, Khalsa moved to Canada with Grison and stayed when their relationship ended, supporting herself with work including cleaning houses. In 1974, she moved to a farm near Millbrook, Ontario, with her artist friend Yvonne Lammerich. That farm provided the setting for her book Julian.

In 1975, Khalsa left the farm and joined a women's health collective in Toronto. When all the other members of the collective moved into the 3HO Kundalini Yoga Ashram, she moved along with them. In time, she converted to Sikhism and received her new name from Yogi Bhajan, meaning "princess of kindness and purity."

While living in the Ashram, Khalsa became responsible for designing the 3HO's promotional materials. This led to her business involvement in the late 1970s with the graphic design studio Intermedia Associates and other small business ventures with local artist-entrepreneur Brian Irving.

It was during this period that Khalsa received a series of parcels from New York City containing items from her earlier life. In an abandoned art portfolio Irving discovered several drawings and story ideas (which Khalsa later incorporated into her books). Despite his enthusiasm for these echoes of her former life as an artist and writer, Khalsa believed that these former personal interests might be at odds with her commitment to the spiritual lifestyle at the Ashram.

In the early 1980s, she moved to the 3HO live-in yoga centre in Montreal.

Although she published a short story in the Carolina Quarterly as Marcia Schonfeld in 1972, her first entry into the publishing world as Dayal Kaur Khalsa took place when she was introduced to May Cutler, publisher and president of Tundra Books, in 1982. Khalsa brought illustrations to show, and Cutler was impressed by her sense of colour.

Khalsa's first project with Tundra was twelve object-recognition picture books for infants in vibrant colours. Her first book for older children, Tales of a Gambling Grandma, was a success, winning her a large American contract and a number of awards. However, around the time of its publishing, Khalsa's father committed suicide and she was diagnosed with breast cancer. Seven more books followed in close succession. Cutler wrote of her: "She was extremely generous with her art. Her books have as many as twenty-five paintings – in contrast to half that many in many children's books – plus endleaves that are as caringly crafted as the interiors. I asked her once where she got the energy and time to develop the stories and do fifty or sixty illustrations a year. (That was between operations, hospital visits, chemotherapy, and all the accompanying discomfort.) She grinned: "It's easy, May. I've got a deadline."

Dayal Kaur Khalsa died of breast cancer at the age of 46 in Vancouver, British Columbia. Khalsa was related to research psychologist Irvin Sam Schonfeld.

== Works ==
- "In the Eyes of the Women" (as Marcia Schonfeld) (Carolina Quarterly, Winter 1972)
- The Baabee Books, Series I and II (Tundra, 1983)
- The Baabee Books, Series III (Tundra, 1984)
- Tales of a Gambling Grandma (Clarkson N. Potter/Tundra, 1986)
  - UK: MacDonald, 1988
- I Want a Dog (Clarkson N. Potter / Tundra, 1987)
- Sleepers (Clarkson N. Potter / Tundra, 1988)
- My Family Vacation (Clarkson N. Potter / Tundra, 1988)
- How Pizza Came to Queens (Clarkson N. Potter, 1989)
  - Canada: Tundra, 1989
- Julian (Clarkson N. Potter / Tundra, 1989)
- Cowboy Dreams (Clarkson N. Potter / Tundra, 1990)
- Snow Cat (Clarkson N. Potter / Tundra, 1992)

== Awards and honours ==
- 1986: The New York Times Notable Children's Book for Tales of a Gambling Grandma
- 1986: New York Public Library Best Children's Book for Tales of a Gambling Grandma
- 1987: Amelia Frances Howard-Gibbon Illustrator's Award Finalist
- 1987: American Institute of Graphic Arts Show Winner's List for I Want a Dog
- 1988: American Booksellers Association/Children's Book Council Children's Bestseller List for I Want a Dog
- 1988: Governor General's Award for English-language children's illustration finalist for Sleepers
- 1988: Parents' Choice Award for Book Illustration for Sleepers
- 1988: Booklist Outstanding Picture Book of the Year for My Family Vacation

== Film adaptations ==
- I Want a Dog by Sheldon Cohen, National Film Board of Canada
- Snow Cat by Sheldon Cohen, National Film Board of Canada
