= I Want a Dog (film) =

- Directed by: Sheldon Cohen
- Produced by: Marcy Page; David Verrall
- Starring: Marnie McPhail
- Edited by: Sheldon Cohen
- Music by: Zander Ary; Vocals: Neko Case
- Distributed by: National Film Board of Canada
- Release date: October 25, 2003 (Chicago International Children's Film Festival)
- Running time: 10 minutes
- Country: Canada
- Language: English

I Want a Dog is a 2003 animated short film, based on 1987 children's book of the same title by Dayal Kaur Khalsa. it is directed by Sheldon Cohen, is produced by Marcy Page and David Verrall. It was starring Marnie McPhail. It tells the story of a girl named May who wants more than anything to have a dog. She tries various strategies to get her parents to allow her one, at last settles for having a rollerskate which she treats like a dog, and in the end wins her desire.

The film has garnered 10 international awards, including First Prize from the Chicago International Children's Film Festival. and the Zagreb World Festival of Animated Films.

== Plot summary ==
May is a little girl who loves puppies. Her wish is to raise her puppy. However, her parents did not allow her to have a dog. May have tried numerous ways, but her parents still do not agree. When she thinks about to give up, she remembers what her dad had said when she was learning to skate in her childhood:" If at first you don't succeed, try again." Then she found a way to persuade her parents to agree her to have a dog. Finally, May successfully convince her parents to get her puppy.
