= 2013 Westmount municipal election =

Local election in Canada

- 3 November 2013

8 seats in Westmount City Council
Incumbent Mayor
Peter Trent
Independent

Municipal elections were held in the city of Westmount, Quebec, Canada on 3 November 2013 as part of the 2013 Quebec municipal elections. Voters elected 8 positions on the Westmount City Council, as well as one mayor. On 4 October, Mayor Peter Trent, as well as councillors Nicole Forbes and Victor Drury were acclaimed. Councillors Tim Price of District 2 and Gary Ikeman of District 5 did not seek another term on council.

== Election Notes ==
Twenty-five-year-old Philip A. Cutler became the youngest city council member in Westmount's History. Cynthia Lulham was elected for a 6th term, making her the longest serving council member. It was the second consecutive term that Mayor Peter Trent and District 3 councillor Victor Drury were elected by acclamation. The majority, 5 of 8 seats, on council were held by women.

== Mayor ==
Candidate	Vote	%
Peter Trent (incumbent)	Acclaimed	–
Result: Announced 3 November

== Westmount City Council Candidates ==
=== District 1 ===
Candidate	Vote	%
Julia Carbone-Gold	275	48.25
Patrick Martin (incumbent)	295	51.75
Result: Patrick Martin

=== District 2 ===
Candidate	Vote	%
Philip A. Cutler	301	57.88
Peter Starr	219	42.12
Result: Philip A. Cutler

=== District 3 ===
Candidate	Vote	%
Victor Drury (incumbent)	Acclaimed	–
Result: Victor Drury

=== District 4 ===
Candidate	Vote	%
Rosalind Davis	349	60.91
Kathleen W. Duncan (Incumbent)	224	39.09
Result: Rosalind Davis

=== District 5 ===
Candidate	Vote	%
John P. Fretz	289	44.19
Christina Smith	365	55.81
Result: Christina Smith

=== District 6 ===
Candidate	Vote	%
Nicole Forbes (Incumbent)	Acclaimed	–
Result: Nicole Forbes

=== District 7 ===
Candidate	Vote	%
Cynthia Lulham (Incumbent)	338	56.90
Mavis Young	256	43.10
Result: Cynthia Lulham

=== District 8 ===
Candidate	Vote	%
Andrei Jones	65	19.70
Theodora Samiotis (Incumbent)	265	80.30
Result: Theodora Samiotis

Preceded by 2009	Westmount municipal elections	Incumbent
