= The Hockey Sweater =

1979 Canadian short story

- The cover of The Hockey Sweater
- Author: Roch Carrier
- Original title: Le chandail de hockey
- Translator: Sheila Fischman
- Illustrator: Sheldon Cohen
- Language: French
- Publisher: Tundra Books
- Publication date: 1979
- Publication place: Canada
- ISBN: 978-0-88776-169-0

The Hockey Sweater (French: Le chandail de hockey) is a short story by Canadian author Roch Carrier and translated to English by Sheila Fischman. It was originally published in 1979 under the title "Une abominable feuille d'érable sur la glace" ("An abominable maple leaf on the ice"). It was adapted into an animated short called The Sweater (Le Chandail) by the National Film Board of Canada (NFB) in 1980 and illustrated by Sheldon Cohen.

The story is based on a real experience Carrier had as a child in Sainte-Justine, Quebec, in 1946 as a fan of the Montreal Canadiens hockey team and its star player, Maurice Richard. Carrier and his friends all wear Canadiens sweaters with Richard's number 9 on the back. When his mother orders a new sweater from the Eaton's department store in the big city after the old one has worn out, he is mistakenly sent a sweater of Montreal's bitter rival, the Toronto Maple Leafs, instead. Carrier faces the persecution of his peers and his coach prevents him from playing.

The Hockey Sweater is Carrier's most famous work and is considered an iconic piece of Canadian literature. The story has sold over 300,000 copies and has been republished in numerous anthologies. It exemplifies the nation's passion for hockey, and while it is often considered an allegory of the relationship and tensions that exist between francophones and anglophones, the story is popular throughout the entire nation. A line from the story appears on Canadian five-dollar bills as part of the Canadian Journey banknote series printed between 2001 and 2013.

== Background ==
In the aftermath of Quebec's Quiet Revolution, tensions between francophones within the province and anglophones escalated as a provincial movement, led by the governing Parti Québécois, to separate from Canada reached its peak in the late 1970s. Seeking to explain Quebec's independence movement, the Canadian Broadcasting Corporation's (CBC) Toronto affiliate asked Roch Carrier, whose debut novel La Guerre, Yes Sir had been popular among both French and English Canadians, to explain "what does Quebec want?"

Carrier spent several weeks trying to answer the question, ultimately producing what he described as a "flat essay" that was "dull as an editorial in a newspaper". Three days before his deadline, Carrier informed the CBC that he would not be able to complete the project. He was told that the network had already booked studio time for him and had been promoting his appearance. As he remained unwilling to present his essay, Carrier was asked to write about anything he wanted to fill the time.

Considering what to write, Carrier thought of his own childhood. He stated in an interview that he began thinking of "when was it that I felt I was really myself? And I remember it was when I put on my skates and my Eaton catalogues on my legs, and I stood up, and I was taller than my mom, and I had a stick in my hands, so I was stronger than my brother, and I felt that I was little me. So I started to write about that and it turned into the Hockey Sweater story."

== Summary ==
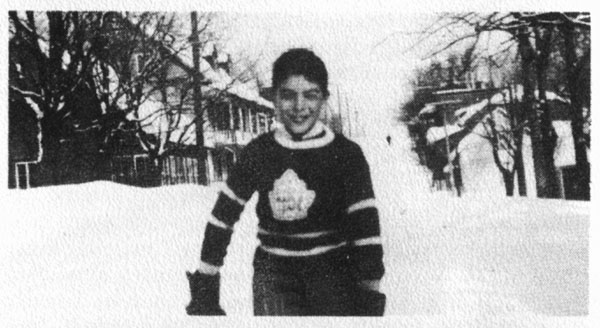
Roch Carrier as a young boy, wearing a Toronto Maple Leafs sweater

The Hockey Sweater is based on a real-life experience Carrier had in 1946 in his hometown of Sainte-Justine, Quebec. The story centres on the obsession he and his friends had with the Montreal Canadiens' organization and their star player, Maurice "The Rocket" Richard. He writes of how they emulated Richard's style and mannerisms, and on the ice: "we were five Maurice Richards against five other Maurice Richards, throwing themselves on the puck. We were ten players all wearing the uniform of the Montreal Canadiens, all with the same burning enthusiasm. We all wore the famous number 9 on our backs."

His old sweater having worn out, Carrier's mother seeks to replace it. She writes a letter to Eaton's in French to order a new sweater from the Eaton's catalogue, which he said had order forms only in English, unaware that Eaton's had published a French catalogue since 1927 and accepted correspondence in French and several other languages. When the package arrives, the young Carrier is horrified to discover the sweater of the rival Toronto Maple Leafs was sent by mistake. He argues with his mother, who refuses to return the sweater for fear of offending "Monsieur Eaton", believing him to be an English-speaking fan of Toronto (unaware that Eaton's policy was "Goods Satisfactory or Money Refunded", as shown on the cover of the catalogue).

A humiliated Carrier wears the sweater to the rink where his peers stare at him in his blue sweater. His coach removes him from his usual forward position, holding him back as a reserve on defence. By the third period, he still has not played when one of his team's defencemen is struck with a stick. Believing his chance had finally come, Carrier jumps onto the ice, only to be given an immediate penalty by the parish priest acting as referee. The priest claims Carrier's substitution is illegal as there are already five players on the ice. Carrier is so angry that he smashes his stick on the ice in frustration, for which the curate scolds him: "just because you're wearing a new Toronto Maple Leafs sweater unlike the others, it doesn't mean you're going to make the laws around here." The curate sends Carrier to the church to pray for forgiveness, where Carrier instead asks God to send "a hundred million moths" to eat his Toronto Maple Leafs sweater.

== Publication ==
Carrier wrote the story in French, and it first appeared in 1979 under the title "Une abominable feuille d'érable sur la glace" ("An abominable maple leaf on the ice") in a collection of his works called Les Enfants du bonhomme dans la lune (Children of the Man in the Moon). It appeared in an English translation by Sheila Fischman the same year as part of an English collection of Carrier's work called The Hockey Sweater and Other Stories. It has since been republished in numerous anthologies of Canadian and hockey literature.

== Adaptations ==
The Sweater
- Directed by: Sheldon Cohen
- Produced by: Marrin Canell; Derek Lamb; David Verrall
- Starring: Roch Carrier (narrator); Jean-Guy Moreau (voice)
- Edited by: David Verrall
- Music by: Normand Roger
- Distributed by: National Film Board of Canada
- Release date: 1980
- Running time: 10:21
- Country: Canada
- Languages: French; English
- Budget: $199,000

A year after publication, the National Film Board of Canada adapted the story into a ten-minute animated short film called The Sweater. It was animated by Sheldon Cohen and narrated by Carrier. The film had a budget of CA$199,000 (equivalent to $742,632 in 2025). The film became one of the National Film Board's most popular works and has won numerous awards. It was named the Best Animated Film at the 1981 British Academy Film Awards.

In 1982 Cohen approached May Cutler, founder of Tundra Books, to create an illustrated children's book of the story. It was published in 1984 as The Hockey Sweater, and by 2014 had sold over 300,000 copies. Following the success of the book, Cutler asked Carrier to write three more stories of his childhood to be illustrated by Cohen, each covering a different sport in a different season. They were published as The Boxing Champion (1991), The Longest Home Run (1994) and The Basketball Player (1996).

During the fall season of 2017, The Segal Centre for Performing Arts in Montreal, staged a musical adaptation of the story. The Hockey Sweater: A Musical world premiered in celebration of Montreal's 375th anniversary. The original cast features an ensemble of mainly children, including Drew Davis, Berkley Silverman and led by Jesse Noah Gruman, among others. The original production was choreographed and directed by Donna Feore, written by Emil Sher and composed by Jonathan Monro. The production made its second appearance on the National Arts Center stage in Ottawa.

== Themes ==
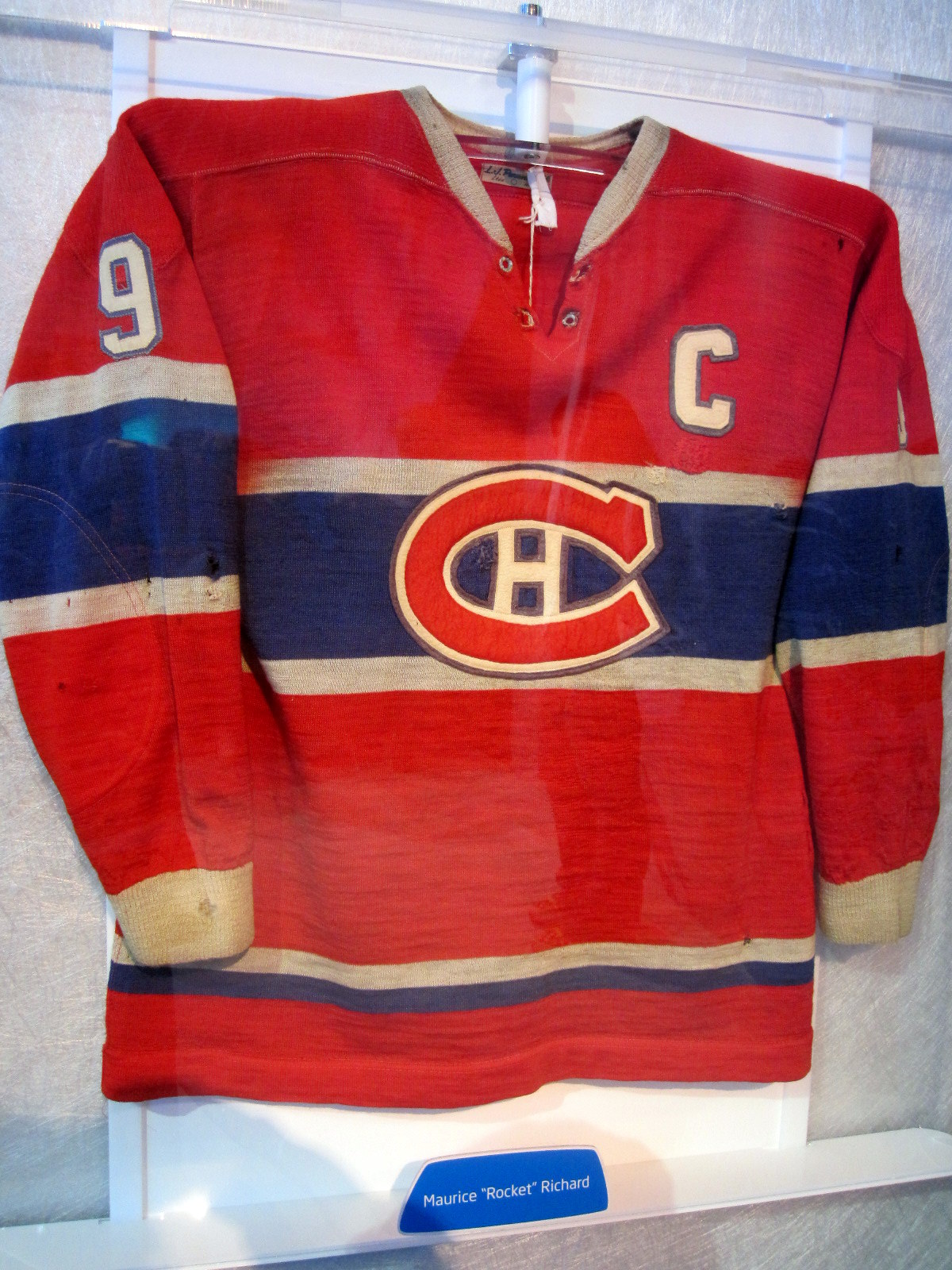
One of Richard's sweaters

The passion Carrier and his friends had for the game of hockey, particularly for the Montreal Canadiens, is the dominant theme of the story. In introducing the film for his video anthology Leonard Maltin's Animation Favorites from the National Film Board of Canada, American critic Leonard Maltin noted that hockey is "an obsession, a country-wide preoccupation that dominates many lives", particularly those of children. He argued that The Sweater is one of the National Film Board's best animated works that combined humour with cultural significance.

Of particular emphasis was the children's fascination with Maurice Richard. Montreal's star player from 1942 until 1960, Richard was a prolific goal scorer. In the 1944–45 season – one year before the events of The Hockey Sweater – Richard became the first player in National Hockey League history to score 50 goals in a 50-game season. Richard attended the 1980 premiere of The Sweater in Montreal, and according to Carrier, was moved to tears by the film. Richard also requested copies so that he could show it to his own children.

Sheldon Posen, curator of the Canadian Museum of Civilization, noted during the opening of an exhibit dedicated to Richard in 2004 that he had long been an idol in Quebec, but it was Carrier's story that expanded Richard's reputation in English Canada and sealed his place as a pan-Canadian hero. Jason Blake, a professor of English at the University of Ljubljana, argued the irony of this in his book Canadian Hockey Literature. He stated that many francophones viewed Richard as a "hero of the people, an athletic freedom fighter against the rest of Canada". The conflicts Carrier experienced in The Hockey Sweater are sometimes viewed as being an allegory for the relationship and tensions between French and English Canada, as well as the rivalry between the Canadiens and the Maple Leafs. Carrier stated, however, he had no political motivations, and only wished to "tell a good little story".

== Cultural impact ==
The Hockey Sweater has achieved an iconic place in Canadian literature. It is the defining work of Carrier's career, and while he has lamented the fact that it has so overshadowed his other works, Carrier appreciates what its popularity has given him: "There is almost not one day in my life that there is not something nice that happens because of the story."

As an illustration of the place hockey holds in the Canadian psyche, the Bank of Canada placed a line from the story on the reverse of the 2001 series five-dollar bill, making Carrier the first author to be quoted on a Canadian banknote. The line, appearing in both French and English is: « Les hivers de mon enfance étaient des saisons longues, longues. Nous vivions en trois lieux : l’école, l’église et la patinoire; mais la vraie vie était sur la patinoire. » / "The winters of my childhood were long, long seasons. We lived in three places – the school, the church and the skating rink – but our real life was on the skating rink." It is accompanied by scenes of children playing outdoors in the winter, centred by one in a Montreal Canadiens sweater with Maurice Richard's number 9 on his back.

The illustrated book of The Hockey Sweater was among the children's books included as official Canadian gifts presented to the Prince of Wales and his family during an official visit in 1991, for his then nine-year-old son William. Canadian astronaut Robert Thirsk, as part of a personal tradition of honouring others, brought a copy of the story to space when he travelled to the International Space Station in 2009 and later presented the copy to Carrier. Of the story, Thirsk said: "It represents part of Canadian literacy, it represents support of reading and I just wanted to say thank you to Mr. Carrier." The story has also been set to music by composer Abigail Richardson-Schulte as part of a piece commissioned by the Toronto Symphony, the Calgary Philharmonic and National Arts Centre Orchestras in 2012.

The story is referenced in the Craig of the Creek episode “The New Jersey”, where the character J.P. Mercer asks his father in Montreal to get a new hockey jersey to replace his torn red one, only to end up with a blue one instead. The jersey, belonging to a fictional Vancouver team, bears Richard’s number 9, which is attributed in-universe to a player named Carrier.
