= Donna Feore =

Canadian choreographer and theatre director

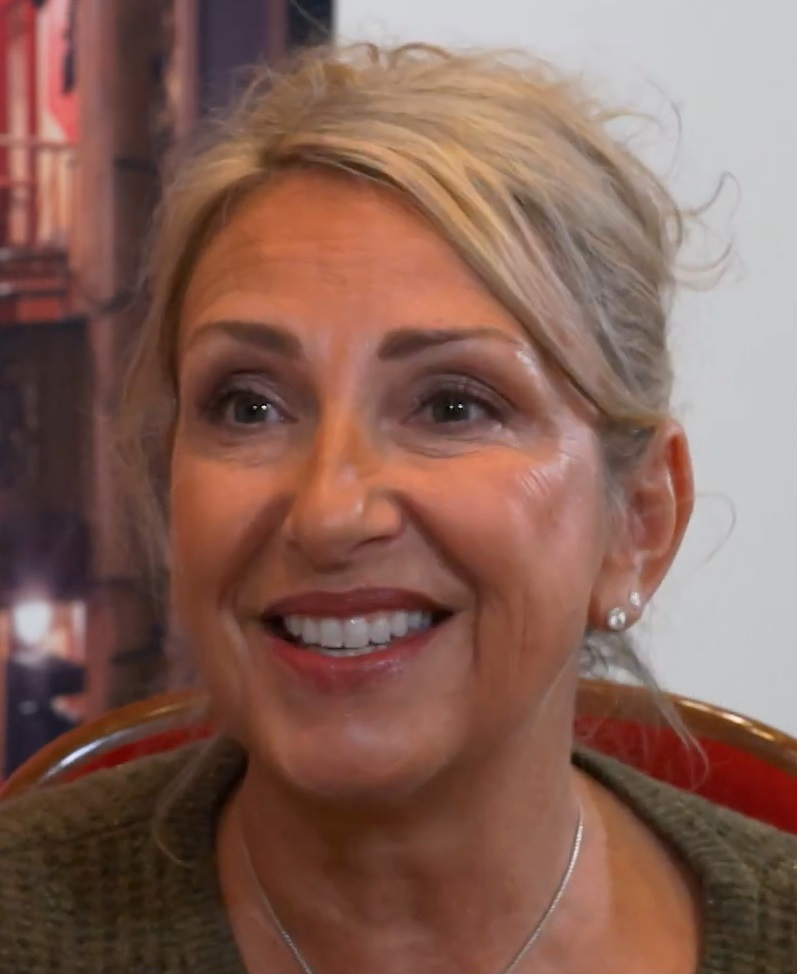
- Feore in 2024
- Born: Donna Starnes; June 20, 1963 (age 62); Dawson Creek, British Columbia
- Occupations: Choreographer, theatre director
- Spouse: Colm Feore (m. 1994)
- Children: 2

Donna Feore (née Starnes, born June 20, 1963) is a Canadian choreographer and theatre director, most noted for her work with the National Arts Centre and the Stratford Festival.

== Early life ==
Donna Starnes was born in Dawson Creek, British Columbia on June 20, 1963. She grew up in Prince George, British Columbia. She began training in ballet at age seven and, after moving to Vancouver, studied at the Pacific Ballet Theatre.

== Career ==
After being seen by Brian Macdonald in a revue at the Imperial Lounge at Toronto's Royal York Hotel, Feore was cast to make her Stratford debut, as Donna Starnes, in 1990 as a featured dancer in Guys and Dolls. That season, she was asked by Richard Monette to choreograph the feast of the Lupercal in his production of Julius Caesar.

Feore has directed many musical theatre productions at Stratford, including Crazy for You, The Sound of Music, Guys and Dolls and A Chorus Line.

Feore has also worked with the National Arts Centre (NAC) in Ottawa, the Detroit Symphony, and the Canadian Opera Company. For the NAC, she was creative producer and director of Life Reflected, described as "an immersive symphonic experience celebrating youth, promise and courage, revealed in the compelling and diverse portraits of four women". She was also director of The Hockey Sweater and A Midsummer Night's Dream by Felix Mendelssohn, and the creator of the NAC's Undisrupted series for CBC Gem.

In addition to her work in the theatre, Feore has choreographed for film and television. She served as choreographer for the Eloise tv movies (Eloise at Christmastime and Eloise at the Plaza) and the film Mean Girls.

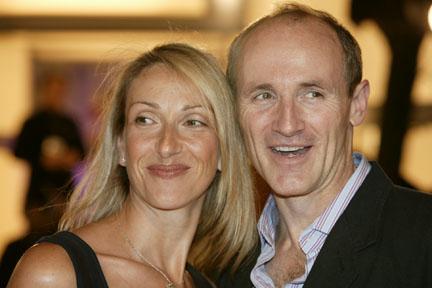
Donna and Colm Feore at TIFF 2007

In 2022, Feore announced she would be taking a break from the Stratford Festival. In 2023, she directed and choreographed the world premiere of the musical Summer Stock at the Goodspeed Opera House.

== Personal life ==
Donna Feore met actor Colm Feore in 1990 while Donna had just started as a dancer at the Stratford Festival. They have been married since 1994. Together they have two children, Anna and Tom. Feore also has a step-son, Jack.
