= Jacques Poulin =

Canadian novelist (1937–2025)

Jacques Poulin (French pronunciation: [ʒak pulɛ̃]; 23 September 1937 – 21 August 2025) was a Canadian novelist.

== Life and career ==
Poulin was born in Saint-Gédéon-de-Beauce, Quebec, on 23 September 1937. He studied psychology and literature at the Université Laval in Quebec City; he started his career as government translator and a college career counselor. Only after the success of his second novel, Jimmy (1969), was he able to pursue writing full-time. Poulin wrote fourteen novels, many of which have been translated into English by Sheila Fischman and published by Cormorant Books.

He lived in Paris for ten years, but later moved to Quebec City and then Île d'Orléans.

Poulin's Volkswagen Blues was selected as a candidate in the 2005 edition of CBC's Canada Reads, where it was championed by Roch Carrier, author and former National Librarian of Canada.

Poulin died on 21 August 2025, at the age of 87.

== Awards and nominations ==
Year	Nominated work	Award	Category	Result	Ref.
1978	Les grandes marées	Governor General's Award	French-language fiction	Won	
1984	Volkswagen Blues	Governor General's Award	French-language fiction	Nominated	
1989	Le Vieux Chagrin	Prix Quebec-Paris	—	Won	
1989	Le Vieux Chagrin	Governor General's Award	French-language fiction	Nominated	
1990	—	Molson Prize	—	Nominated	
1991	Le Vieux Chagrin	Prix Quebec-Paris	—	Nominated	
1995	—	Prix Athanase-David	—	Won	
2000	—	Molson Prize	—	Won	
2003	Les Yeux bleus de Mistassini	Prix littéraire des collégiens	Prix des cégépiens	Won	
2007	La traduction est une histoire d'amour	Prix littéraire des collégiens	Prix des cégépiens	Nominated	
2008	—	Prix Gilles-Corbeil	—	Won	

== Bibliography ==
- The "Jimmy" Trilogy:
  - Mon cheval pour un royaume — 1967 (Translated as My Horse for a Kingdom, 1979)
  - Jimmy — 1969 (Translated as Jimmy)
  - Le cœur de la baleine bleue — 1970 (Translated as The Heart of the Blue Whale)
- Faites de beaux rêves — 1974
- Les grandes marées — 1978 (Translated as Spring Tides, 2007)
- Volkswagen Blues — 1984 (Translated as Volkswagen Blues)
- Le Vieux Chagrin — 1989 (Translated as Mr. Blue)
- La tournée d'automne — 1993 (Translated as Autumn Rounds, 2021)
- Chat sauvage — 1998 (Translated as Wild Cat)
- Les yeux bleus de Mistassini — 2002 (Translated as My Sister's Blue Eyes)
- La traduction est une histoire d'amour — 2006 (Translated as Translation is a Love Affair, 2009)
- L'anglais n'est pas une langue magique — 2009 (Translated as English is Not a Magic Language, 2016)
- L'homme de la Saskatchewan — 2011
- Un jukebox dans la tête — 2015

== See also ==
- List of writers from Quebec
