= Sheila Fischman =

Canadian translator

Sheila Fischman CM CQ
- Born: 1 December 1937 (age 88); Moose Jaw, Saskatchewan, Canada
- Occupation: Translator

Sheila Leah Fischman (born 1 December 1937) is a Canadian translator who specializes in the translation of works of contemporary Quebec literature from French to English.

Born in Moose Jaw, Saskatchewan, she was raised in Elgin, Ontario. She holds an M.A. from the University of Toronto. Fischman is a former editor of The Montreal Star's book section, as well as a columnist for The Globe and Mail and The Montreal Gazette and a broadcaster for CBC Radio. She is a founding member of the Literary Translators' Association of Canada and founding co-editor of Ellipse: Œuvres en traduction/Writers in Translation. She lives in Montreal.

== Works ==
Fischman has translated nearly 200 Quebec novels into English, including works by Michel Tremblay, Hubert Aquin, Jacques Poulin, Suzanne Jacob, Anne Hébert, Marie-Claire Blais, Roch Carrier, Yves Beauchemin, Kim Thúy, Dominique Fortier and François Gravel.

== Honours and citations ==
Since 1987, Fischman has received 14 nominations for the Governor General's Award for French to English translation, receiving the prize in 1998 for Bambi and Me, her translation of Michel Tremblay's Les vues animés.

She has twice won the Canada Council Prize for Translation (in 1974 and 1984) and the Columbia University Translation Center Félix-Antoine Savard Award, for Heartbreaks Along the Road by Roch Carrier (1989) and The First Garden by Anne Hébert (1990).

Her translation of Anne Hébert's Am I Disturbing You was a finalist for the 2000 Scotiabank Giller Prize. Her translation of The Perfect Circle by Pascale Quiviger was a finalist for the same prize in 2006. Her translations of three of Kim Thúy's novels (Ru, Vi, and Em) were also nominated, in 2012, 2018, and 2021 respectively.

Four of Fischman's translations have been selected for Canada Reads: Next Episode by Hubert Aquin in 2003; Volkswagen Blues by Jacques Poulin in 2005; The Fat Woman Next Door Is Pregnant by Michel Tremblay in 2009; and Ru by Kim Thúy in 2015. Her translations won the competition in 2003 and 2015.

In recognition of her work, Fischman has received honorary doctorates from the University of Ottawa and the University of Waterloo.

In 2000, she was invested into the Order of Canada and, in 2008, made a Knight of the National Order of Quebec. She won the 2008 Molson Prize.
