= Small Saves =

American comic strip

- Small Saves in action
- Author: James DeMarco
- Website: http://www.smallsaves.com/
- Current status/schedule: Weekly
- Launch date: 1991
- Genre(s): Humor, sports, ice hockey, children

Small Saves is a syndicated periodic comic strip written and illustrated by James DeMarco. Published weekly, the comic focuses on a young ice hockey goaltender named Small Saves and his adventures.

== Overview ==
The strip takes place in a small, unnamed northeast US town. Small Saves is about nine years old and plays goaltender for a team of children competing against other children's teams.

Small Saves always wears his game jersey and his goaltending helmet, even when sleeping. When not in a game, though, he wears his helmet tipped back on his head. The inspiration for this was an actual goaltender in the South Florida Hockey League, Anthony Citarella, did this regularly when not playing hockey. Small Saves wears #1, the traditional goalie jersey number. Small Saves is very talented at his position but when he has a bad game, or loses a game, he does so in spectacular fashion. He often instigates dressing room pizza fights among his teammates, much to the consternation of his coaches and league officials. His family is proud of Small Saves and he is friendly with his teammates and members of opposing teams alike. He is also very proud of his equipment, hosting parties at his home when a new piece of equipment arrives. His equipment is always pictured as retro, leather-and-wood equipment, tan-brown in color. His mask is plain, undecorated white. He has no doubts about his future vocation: Hall of Fame professional goaltender.

== Other characters ==
- Mom: Small Saves' devoted hockey mom frequently has to resort to tricks to get Small Saves to do anything not related to hockey, such as telling him a game starts in 15 minutes in order to get him up for school.
- Mia: Small Saves' cat, who also wears a goalie mask tipped back on his head. Mia is based on artist James DeMarco's real-life cat, also named "Mia."
- The Coach: The Coach, name unknown, is the long-suffering manager of Small Saves' team. It is frequently The Coach who deals with Small Saves' reactions to bad losses.
- The Defenseman: The Defenseman, named Dee, is a female teammate. She is the only player on Small Saves' team who does not wear a helmet, has long red hair, and wears dark sunglasses. She is always willing to go toe-to-toe with Small Saves exchanging trash talk with her teammate.
- The Lord Protector: Small Saves' bodyguard, this character is a hockey enforcer who stands nine feet tall and wears size 78EEEEEEEE skates. Rather than focusing on fighting he emphasizes the health and safety of his teammates. He is shown only through the eyes of his teammates (frightened glances skyward) or as bits of his equipment (stick blades that are as tall as other players).

== The artist ==
James "Jay" DeMarco started playing ice hockey as a goaltender at age 5 and decades later still plays regularly. His experience included prep hockey in Watertown, Mass. and three years of semi-professional play in the South Florida Hockey League. Afterwards, DeMarco returned to Boston. He earned an associate degree in Commercial Art at Bunker Hill Community College. Later work as a graphic designer developed his drawing style, while continuing to indulge his passion for goaltending in local adult leagues. Goaltending contributes to the perspective needed to create the strip. "From your vantage point," DeMarco says, "you get to see the best and worst of your team, and you need to balance your desire to scream with the ability to laugh."

Small Saves debuted in 1991. DeMarco says that while writing the comic isn't hard, it is tough to keep it fresh given the specific subject matter of an ice hockey goalie. DeMarco draws the comic by hand on paper, pencilling it then inking it, and then coloring a copy to preserve the original.

The comic is a part-time job for DeMarco, who also works at a nursing home, does silk-screening, and helps out at a skating rink. James says that his fascination for cartooning began very young, drawing inspiration from classics such as The Family Circus, Peanuts and Dennis the Menace.

In addition to Small Saves, He also illustrated a children's book about ice hockey, written by Darren Hersh, called Holy Moly, We Need a Goalie!: Robbin to the Rescue! DeMarco has also authored and illustrated another children's book called The Dinosaurs of Winter.

== Distribution ==
Small Saves has appeared in hockey-related publications such as USA Hockey Magazine, Independent Sports News, Goalie's World magazine and InsideHockey, and is linked through NHL.com. DeMarco has said his aim is for Small Saves "to be in every hockey media type there is."

The Canadian Make-a-Wish foundation publishes a black-and-white version of the strip in coloring books that it provides to children in hospitals.

=== Compendiums ===
Eight volumes of collected Small Saves cartoons have been published. These include:

- DeMarco, James (2014-04-05). Goalie on Vacation: A collection of Small Saves cartoons!. CreateSpace Independent Publishing Platform. p. 36. ISBN 978-1497563803.
- DeMarco, James (2014-04-26). Renegade Goaltender: The continued cartoon antics of Small Saves. CreateSpace Independent Publishing Platform. p. 38. ISBN 978-1499277999.
- DeMarco, James (2014-05-05). Where's My Defense...? Even more cartoon antics of Small Saves!. CreateSpace Independent Publishing Platform. p. 38. ISBN 978-1499364088.
- DeMarco, James (2015-03-31). The Goaltenders' Creed: A Small Saves Storybook. CreateSpace Independent Publishing Platform. p. 34. ISBN 978-1518629549.
- DeMarco, James (2017-03-30). When the Game Calls: A Small Saves Storybook. CreateSpace Independent Publishing Platform. p. 34. ISBN 978-1543247879.
- DeMarco, James (2017-08-15). The Day the Dinosaurs Played Hockey: A Small Saves Storybook. CreateSpace Independent Publishing Platform. p. 42. ISBN 978-1974620715.

=== Merchandise ===
Small Saves has a variety of merchandise, including T-shirts, mugs, stickers, and coasters.
