= Peter Trent =

English-born Canadian politician

Peter Trent CQ
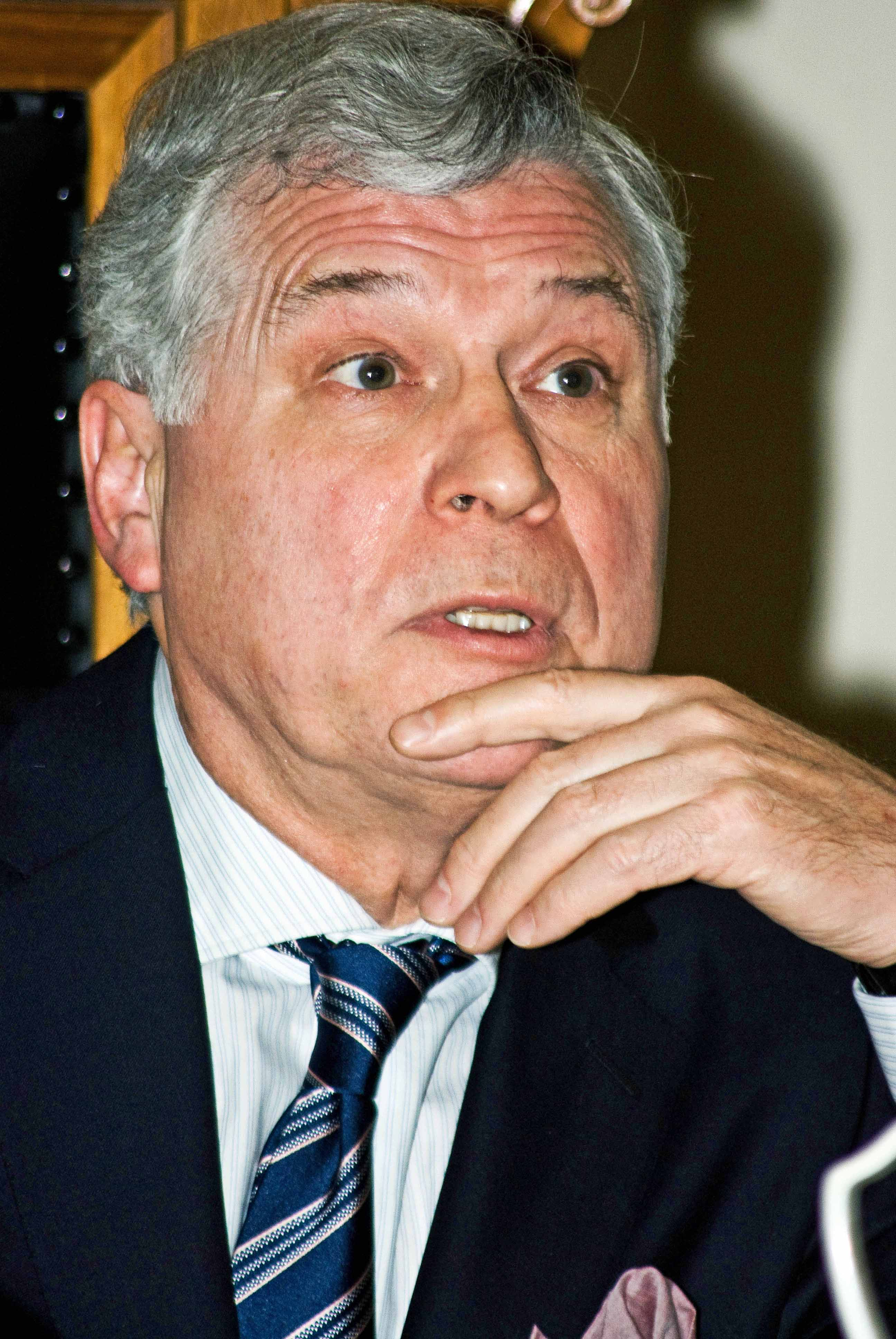

Former Mayor of Westmount, Quebec
- In office 2009–2017
- Preceded by: Karin Marks
- Succeeded by: Christina M. Smith
- In office 1991–2001
- Preceded by: May Cutler
- Succeeded by: Merged with Montreal

Personal details
- Born: Peter Francis Trent; 5 January 1946 (age 80) Loughborough, Leicestershire, England

Peter Francis Trent CQ (born 5 January 1946) is an English-born Canadian businessman and politician. He was mayor of Westmount, Quebec until his retirement in April 2017. He was first elected as councillor in 1983. He served as mayor from 1992 to 2001; he left politics at that time due to the forced merger with the City of Montreal. He again became Mayor of Westmount by acclamation during the 1 November 2009 municipal election.

Born in Loughborough, Leicestershire, England, Trent and his family immigrated to Toronto when he was 10. In 1968, at the age of 22 he left McMaster University in Hamilton, Ontario to work for a chemical company in Montreal. In 1972, he started his own company (with Raymond Charlebois), PBI/Plastibeton Inc. which he would later sell in 1989 to Shell Oil and Lone Star Industries. From 1982 to 1983, he taught marketing at Concordia University's Faculty of Commerce and Administration. In 1992, he received a medal marking the 125th anniversary of Canada. In 1994 he was named honorary lieutenant colonel of the Royal Montreal Regiment, and in 1999 honorary colonel. In 2005 he received the decoration of the Canadian Forces.

After the city of Westmount was amalgamated with Montreal in 2002, Trent resigned from office. He fought for three years for de-mergers as a non-elected official before retiring from politics. He eventually returned to politics and was elected mayor of Westmount in 2009. He retired from the mayor's position in April 2017.

He owns the licenses to many worldwide patents, which supplies him with a significant revenue stream, and this has allowed Trent to devote himself to public service.

Trent's book about the merger-demerger period in Montreal, The Merger Delusion was published in the fall of 2012 by McGill-Queen's University Press. The book was shortlisted for the 2012 Shaughnessy Cohen Prize for Political Writing. He planned to present ideas in the last book that would be the foundation for a debate starting in 2013 about governing the Montreal region. In 2018, he was made a Knight of the National Order of Quebec.
