= Ailbhe Ní Ghearbhuigh =

Irish poet (born 1984)

- Born: 1984 (age 41–42); Tralee, County Kerry
- Education: BA; MA; PhD
- Alma mater: NUI Galway
- Occupation: Poet
- Writing career
- Notable work: Péacadh

Ailbhe Ní Ghearbhuigh is an Irish poet who writes in the Irish language. Born in Tralee, County Kerry, in 1984, she graduated from NUI Galway in 2005 with a BA in Irish and French. She spent time in Bordeaux, France, before returning to Ireland to do an MA in Modern Irish, again at NUI Galway.

She went to New York in August 2007 to teach Irish with the Fulbright program in the CUNY Institute for Irish-American Studies at Lehman College in the Bronx. The Arts Council of Ireland (An Chomhairle Ealaíon) awarded her an artist's bursary in 2008. She has helped to translate her own work into English.

Ní Ghearbhuigh's first collection, Péacadh, was published in 2008. It has been noted that, although its general tenor is optimistic, many of the collection's stronger pieces are marked by a disorientating sense of alienation and an awareness of the world's capricious nature.

Her doctoral dissertation, “An Fhrainc Iathghlas? Tionchar na Fraince ar Athbheochan na Gaeilge, 1893-1922″ (NUI, Galway), won the Adele Dalsimer Prize for Distinguished Dissertation in 2014.

== Bibliography ==
- Péacadh (Coiscéim, 2008)
