= The Rhapsodic Fallacy =

'The Rhapsodic Fallacy' is an essay by United States poet Mary Kinzie in which she defines and attacks a "rhapsodic" conception of poetry. It was first published in Salmagundi of Fall 1984 and was collected in The Cure of Poetry in an Age of Prose: Moral Essays on the Poet's Calling, and a somewhat shorter version of the essay was later anthologized in Twentieth-Century American Poetics The essay was one of several of the mid-1980s that sparked a heated discussion over the role of form in American poetry, and was thus implicated in the formation of the New Formalism movement.

== The rhapsodic conception of poetry ==
Kinzie begins the essay by identifying two contradictory strands in the critical writing and poetry of Edgar Allan Poe which she perceives as "begetting" the "rhapsodic" conception of poetry. These strands are:

1. "intensity can only be achieved in spontaneous, fragmented utterance", and
2. "the mental epic is viable"

She moves on to lament the loss of many forms or genres of poetry that were widely used in earlier times, including satire, the epistle, georgic, pastoral, allegory, philosophical poem, epic, verse drama, and tragedy, and quotes an essay by Australian poet A. D. Hope: "One after another the great forms disappear".

Kinzie sees free verse as the "great equalizer" and ushering in an age of reduced scope and ambition. "When poems not only set themselves at a uniform pitch, but also contract themselves to recurrent, predictable five- or ten-line climaxes, pretty soon the surprises do not surprise us any more. The new prosaic-lyrical effusion is organized to get us into and out of the poem with extraordinary rapidity and no lasting effects."

Kinzie proceeds to identify three main contemporary "substyles" of the prosaic-rhapsodic:

1. the Objective Style
2. the Mixed Ironic Style
3. the Innocuous Surreal Style

== The objective style ==
Kinzie describes the Objective Style as gaining its effects from "the cumulative effect of a string of brief, bland declarative sentences". She lists the tools of the style as being: juxtaposition, portent, non sequitur, and passivity. The last of these, she notes, claims "a kind of reportorial honesty" for the poem.

== The mixed ironic style ==
In the Mixed Ironic Style the poet injects into the work a "stylistic agitation that at first feel rich, sensitive, conscious, attentive to response". Kinzie regards John Ashbery as a prime example of a poet of this style.

== The innocuous surreal style ==
In the third style described by Kinzie, the Innocuous Surreal Style, the poet whimsically and abruptly "violates" the "realistic surface" of the poem. Kinzie describes variants of this style: the Muted Innocuous Surreal and the Comic Surreal.
