= Mary Kinzie =

American writer

- Born: September 30, 1944 (age 81); Montgomery, Alabama, U.S.
- Education: Northwestern University; Johns Hopkins University
- Occupation: Poet

Mary Kinzie (born September 30, 1944) is an American poet and critic, who spent much of her career teaching and directing the Creative Writing Program at Northwestern University.

== Life ==
She received her B.A. from Northwestern University in 1967, and returned there to teach in 1975. She won Fulbright and Woodrow Wilson fellowships to do graduate work at the Free University of Berlin and Johns Hopkins University. She was awarded the John Simon Guggenheim Memorial Foundation Fellowship in 1985 and a National Humanities Center Fellowship in 2005.

Kinzie won the Folger Shakespeare Library's 2008 O. B. Hardison, Jr. Poetry Prize, the only major American prize to recognize a poet for teaching as well as writing.

== Bibliography ==
=== Poetry ===
- California Sorrow. Alfred A. Knopf. 2007. ISBN 978-0-307-26680-4.
- Drift. Alfred A. Knopf. 2005. ISBN 978-0-375-41463-3.
- The Ghost Ship. Alfred A. Knopf. 1996. ISBN 978-0-679-44645-3.
- Autumn Eros and Other Poems. Alfred A. Knopf. 1991. ISBN 978-0-394-58992-3.
- Summers of Vietnam and Other Poems. The Sheep Meadow Press. 1990. ISBN 978-0-935296-83-9.
- Masked Women (1990)
- The Threshold of the Year. University of Missouri Press. 1982. ISBN 978-0-8262-0361-8.

=== Essays ===
- The Cure of Poetry in an Age of Prose: Moral Essays on the Poet's Calling. University of Chicago Press. 1993. ISBN 978-0-226-43736-1. (which includes the influential and controversial essay "The Rhapsodic Fallacy").

=== Theory ===
- A Poet's Guide to Poetry. University of Chicago Press. 1999. ISBN 978-0-226-43739-2.
