= Legna Rodríguez Iglesias =

Cuban poet, playwright and short story writer

- Born: December 15, 1984 (age 41); Camaguey, Cuba
- Occupations: Playwright, poet
- Children: 1

Legna Rodríguez Iglesias (born 1984) is a Cuban poet, playwright, and short story writer. Her work is often characterized by absurdist humor and playfully perverse observations of everyday life in contemporary Cuba and Miami, as well as cross-genre experimentation with prose poetry and narrative poetry. Four of her poems, in the original Spanish and in English translation, were featured in The Kenyon Review's 2018 special issue on new Cuban poetry.

== Personal life ==
She is originally from Camagüey, Cuba and currently lives in Miami, Florida.

== Honors ==
She has won several Cuban awards including, Julio Cortázar Ibero-American Short Story Prize in 2011, the Casa de Las Américas Prize in Theater in 2016, and the Wolsan-Cuba Poetry Prize in 2013 for her collection La Gran Arquitecta. Since 1984, Miami Dade College (MDC) has organized an annual festival called Miami Book Fair, which lasts eight days every November. Miami Book Fair, in alliance with the National Poetry Series, announced the Cuban poet Legna Rodriguez was the winner of the 2016 Paz Prize for Poetry for the book Miami Century Fox. Miami Century Fox works with similar themes as her other poems' essence, dealing with immigrant experiences, identity problems, love, and body. In July 2018, her short story collection Mi novia preferida fue un bulldog francés (Alfaguara, 2017) was nominated for the Gabriel García Márquez Hispano-American Short Story Prize by the Colombian Ministry of Culture and the National Library of Colombia.

== Works ==
=== Poetry ===
- Chicle (ahora es cuando) (Havana: Cuba Editorial, 2016)
- Hilo + hilo (Leiden: Bokeh, 2015)
- Miami Century Fox (New York: Akashic Books, 2017)

=== Fiction ===
- "Ne Me Quite Pas" (Havana: Editorial Abril, 2009)
- Hasta Feldafing no paro y otros relatos (Havana: Editorial Letras Cubanas, 2012)
- Mayonesa bien Brillante (una novela de amor) (Matanzas: Ediciones Matanzas,2012)
- No sabe/no contesta (Havana: Editorial Caja China, 2015)
- Mi novia preferida fue un bulldog francés (Madrid: Alfaguara, 2017)
