= Sheldon Cohen (artist) =

Canadian illustrator and animator

Sheldon Cohen (born 1949) is a Montreal-based animator and children's book illustrator.

== Career ==
His film animation work includes the National Film Board of Canada (NFB) productions The Sweater, a 1980 adaptation of Roch Carrier's short story "The Hockey Sweater"; Pies, a 2004 adaptation of Wilma Riley's short story; I Want a Dog, a 2003 adaptation of the children's book of the same title by Dayal Kaur Khalsa; and My Heart Attack, a 2015 film based on an event in Cohen's own life.

== Filmography ==
- The Sweater (1980)
- Snow Cat (1998)
- I Want a Dog (2003)
- Pies (2004)
- Dreams Come True
- The Three Wishes (2006)
- My Heart Attack (2015)

== Awards ==
The Sweater received several prizes, including a BAFTA Award for Best Animated Film. Cohen followed this success with a picture book version of the film as well a sequel, Un champion, which won him the Governor General's Award for French-language children's illustration.
