= Roch Carrier =

French Canadian writer

Roch Carrier OC FRSC
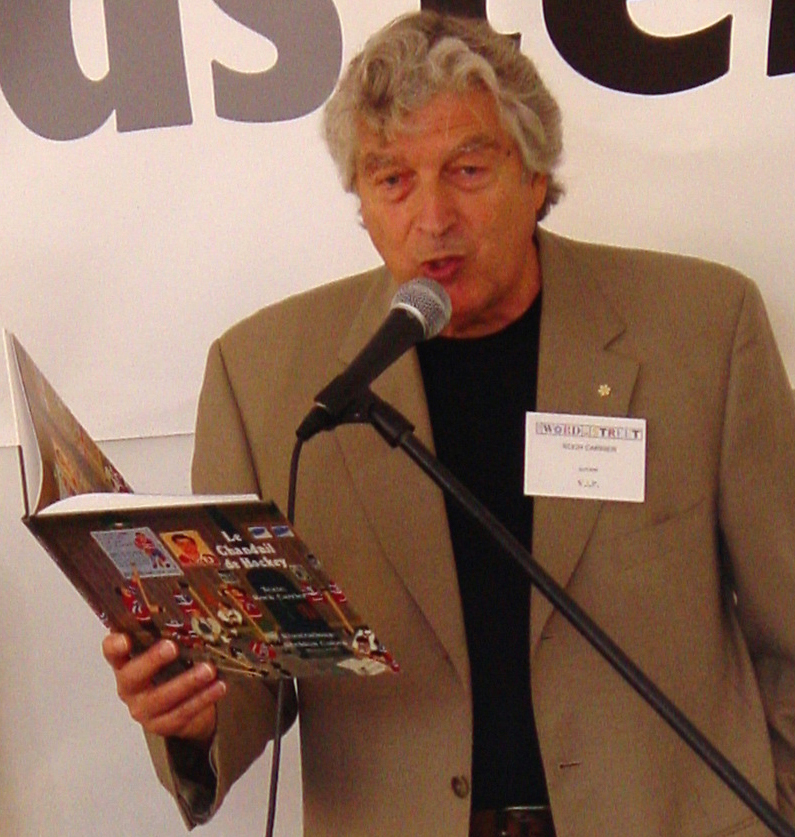
- Carrier in 2006
- Born: 13 May 1937 (age 89); Sainte-Justine, Quebec, Canada
- Writing career
- Language: French
- Notable work: The Hockey Sweater
- Notable awards: Order of Canada

Roch Carrier (born 13 May 1937) is a Canadian novelist and short story author. He is among the best known Quebec writers in English Canada.

== Life ==
He was born in Sainte-Justine, Quebec, and studied at Collège Saint-Louis in New Brunswick, the Université de Montréal in Quebec, and the University of Paris, in Paris, France, where he received a doctorate in literature.

From 1964 to 1994, Carrier was an instructor and administrator at the Royal Military College Saint-Jean. In 1991, he was made an Officer of the Order of Canada. From 1994 to 1997, he served as head of the Canada Council.

In 1998, he ran as an electoral candidate for the Quebec Liberal Party under Jean Charest, in the riding of Crémazie, coming in second place. From 1999 to 2004, Carrier was National Librarian of Canada. With Ian E. Wilson, the then National Archivist, he developed the process to unify the National Archive and National Library.

In 1992, Carrier's Prayers of a Very Wise Child (Prières d'un enfant très très sage) won the Stephen Leacock Memorial Medal for Humour.

Carrier championed Jacques Poulin's novel Volkswagen Blues in Canada Reads 2005.

Carrier has served as playwright at the Théâtre du Nouveau Monde. He has also adapted La guerre, yes sir! and Floralie, où es-tu? for the stage. La guerre, yes sir! was produced as a play in 1970, was performed in English at the Stratford Festival, and was made into a film. Floralie, où es-tu? was performed by Théâtre du Nouveau Monde in 1974. The trilogy consisting of these two novels and Il est par là, le soleil sold better in English than in French.

A quote from "Le chandail de hockey" ("The Hockey Sweater"), one of Carrier's short stories, was reprinted on the back of the Canadian five-dollar note. The story, about when Carrier was a young boy who ordered a Montreal Canadiens sweater from the Eaton's catalogue but received a Toronto Maple Leafs jersey instead, is considered by many to be a literary allegory for the linguistic and cultural tensions between English and French Canadians, although Carrier has stated this was not his intention and he simply wanted to tell a good children's story. The National Film Board of Canada made this story into an animated short film, narrated by Carrier in both the French and English versions.

Heartbreaks Along The Road (De l'amour dans la ferraille) is a work of satirical magical realism. Carrier pokes fun at political and religious figures, using ridiculous scenarios and exaggerated personality traits, while telling the story from different characters' points of view.

Sheila Fischman has won various awards for translation of his books into English.

Two schools are named after Carrier: Roch Carrier French Immersion Public School in Woodstock, Ontario, and Roch Carrier Elementary School in Kanata, Ontario.

Carrier was president of the board of directors for Experiences Canada from 2008 to 2009. Upon his retirement from the board he was made an honorary member.

== Selected works ==
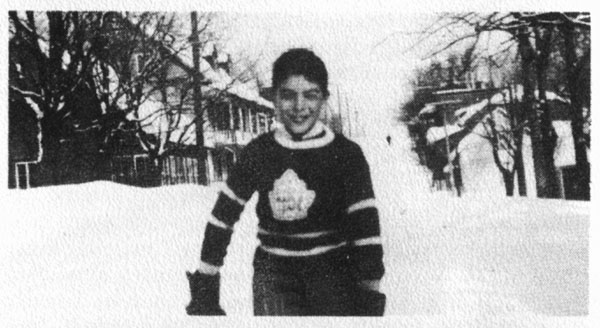
Roch Carrier as a child, wearing the sweater that inspired "The Hockey Sweater".

- Jolis deuils: Petites tragédies pour adults — 1964
- La guerre, yes sir! — 1968 (translated by Sheila Fischman as La Guerre, Yes Sir! — 1970)
- Floralie, où es-tu ? — 1969 (translated by Sheila Fischman as Floralie, Where Are You? — 1971)
- Il est par là, le soleil — 1970 (translated by Sheila Fischman as Is It the Sun, Philibert? — 1972)
- Le deux-millième étage — 1973 (translated by Sheila Fischman as They Won't Demolish Me! — 1974)
- Le jardin des délices — 1975 (translated by Sheila Fischman as The Garden of Delights — 1978)
- Il n'y a pas de pays sans grand-père — 1977 (translated by Sheila Fischman as No Country Without Grandfathers — 1981)
- Les Enfants du bonhomme dans la lune — 1979, (translated by Sheila Fischman as The Hockey Sweater and other stories — 1979, illustration by Sheldon Cohen)
- Les voyageurs de l'arc-en-ciel — 1980, illustration & book design by François Olivier
- Céleste bicyclette — 1980 (translated by Sheila Fischman as The Celestial Bicycle, 1982)
- La dame qui avait des chaînes aux chevilles — 1981 (translated by Sheila Fischman as Lady with Chains, 1984)
- Le cirque noir — 1982
- Ne faites pas mal à l'avenir — 1984
- De l'amour dans la ferraille — 1984 (translated by Sheila Fischman as Heartbreaks Along The Road, 1987)
- La fleur et autres personages — 1985
- Un chameau en Jordanie — 1988
- Enfants de la planète — 1989
- L'homme dans le placard — 1991 (translated by Sheila Fischman as The Man in the Closet, 1993)
- Le cannot dans les nuages — 1991
- Prières d'un enfant très très sage — 1991 (translated by Sheila Fischman as Prayers of a Very Wise Child, 1992)
- Fin — 1994 (translated by Sheila Fischman as The End, 1995)
- Petit homme tornade — 1996 (translated by Sheila Fischman as The Lament of Charlie Longsong, 1998)
- Prières d'un adolescent très très sage — 1998 (translated by Sheila Fischman as Prayers of a Young Man, 1999)
- Une chaise — 1999
- Les moines dans la tour — 2004
- Our Life with the Rocket: The Maurice Richard Story — 2001, translation by Sheila Fischman
- Montcalm et Wolfe — 2014 (translated by Donald Winkler as Montcalm and Wolfe, 2014)

== See also ==
- Canadian literature
