= The Umbrella Academy season 1 =

The Umbrella Academy
- Season 1
- Promotional poster
- Starring: Elliot Page (Note: Initially credited as Ellen Page in the first and second seasons, Netflix updated the onscreen credits from Ellen to Elliot for those seasons within a week (by 8 December 2020) of Page announcing his name change. Also changed were Page's credits in other works in Netflix's exclusive library of streaming products, including the films Tallulah (2016) and Flatliners (2017), and the miniseries Tales of the City (2019).); Tom Hopper; David Castañeda; Emmy Raver-Lampman; Robert Sheehan; Aidan Gallagher; Mary J. Blige; Cameron Britton; John Magaro; Adam Godley; Colm Feore
- No. of episodes: 10

Release
- Original network: Netflix
- Original release: February 15, 2019

Season chronology
- Next → Season 2

The first season of the superhero comedy drama television series The Umbrella Academy was released on Netflix on February 15, 2019 and consisted of 10 episodes. Created for television by Steve Blackman and developed Jeremy Slater, the series is an adaptation of the comic book series of the same name written by Gerard Way and illustrated by Gabriel Bá, both of whom serve as executive producers on the series. The first season adapts the first story arc of the comics, Apocalypse Suite, and revolves around the titular Academy (a group of adopted superhero siblings) reuniting after years apart to investigate the mystery of their father’s death and the threat of a looming apocalypse.

The first season features Elliot Page, Tom Hopper, David Castañeda, Emmy Raver-Lampman, Robert Sheehan, Aidan Gallagher, Cameron Britton, Mary J. Blige, John Magaro, Adam Godley, Colm Feore as the main cast, while Sheila McCarthy, Justin H. Min, Jordan Claire Robbins, Kate Walsh, and Ashley Madekwe appear in recurring roles. This season received positive reviews from critics and audiences alike, with many praising its humor, character dynamics, Sheehan and Gallagher's performances, and use of licensed music.

== Cast and characters ==
=== Main ===
- Elliot Page as Vanya Hargreeves / Number Seven
  - T.J. McGibbon as young Vanya
- Tom Hopper as Luther Hargreeves / Number One
  - Cameron Brodeur as young Luther
- David Castañeda as Diego Hargreeves / Number Two
  - Blake Talabis as young Diego
- Emmy Raver-Lampman as Allison Hargreeves / Number Three
  - Eden Cupid as young Allison
- Robert Sheehan as Klaus Hargreeves / Number Four
  - Dante Albidone as young Klaus
- Aidan Gallagher as Number Five
- Mary J. Blige as Cha-Cha
- Cameron Britton as Hazel
- John Magaro as Leonard Peabody / Harold Jenkins
- Adam Godley as Pogo
- Colm Feore as Sir Reginald Hargreeves

=== Recurring ===
- Sheila McCarthy as Agnes Rofa
- Justin H. Min as Ben Hargreeves / Number Six
  - Ethan Hwang as young Ben
- Jordan Claire Robbins as Grace Hargreeves / Mom
- Kate Walsh as The Handler
- Ashley Madekwe as Detective Eudora Patch
- Peter Outerbridge as The Conductor
- Rainbow Sun Francks as Detective Chuck Beaman

=== Notable guests ===
- Ken Hall as Herb
- Patrice Goodman as Dot

== Episodes ==
No. overall	No. in season	Title	Directed by	Teleplay by	Original release date
1	1	"We Only See Each Other at Weddings and Funerals"	Peter Hoar	Jeremy Slater	February 15, 2019
In 1989, forty-three women simultaneously give birth, despite showing no prior signs of pregnancy. Seven of the children are found and adopted by eccentric billionaire Sir Reginald Hargreeves, who raises them as a superhero team. Hargreeves calls the children by number, one through seven, but Grace, their android mother, gives them names. Years later the surviving children are grown, and reluctantly reunite for Hargreeves' funeral. The monocle that he always wore is missing after his death, leading Luther (Number One) to suspect foul play. Number Five, who disappeared 17 years before, appears in a ball of blue energy, claiming to have returned from the future. He has his 13-year-old body but claims that he is fifty-eight years old. Tensions emerge among the siblings, and Diego (Number Two) gets into a fight with Luther that destroys a statue of their dead brother, Ben (Number Six). Later, Five is visiting a doughnut shop when several armed men enter and open fire. After killing the men, he removes a tracker embedded in his arm. It is revealed that Diego has the monocle and that Klaus (Number Four) can talk to Ben's ghost. Five warns his estranged sister Vanya (Number Seven) that the world will end in eight days.
2	2	"Run Boy Run"	Andrew Bernstein	Steve Blackman	February 15, 2019
Vanya thinks Five's mind has been corrupted by time travel, and that the world will not really end. Agents Cha-Cha and Hazel arrive at a motel and begin to track their target. Luther learns that Diego had a boxing match at the time of their father's death, which rules him out as a suspect, and Vanya meets her latest violin student, Leonard. Partly assisted by Klaus, Number Five tries to find out the origin of a prosthetic eye he found in the future, knowing that its owner will soon destroy the world. The brothers learn, however, that the eye has yet to be manufactured in the present. Five visits a department store to see "Dolores", a store mannequin who was his companion for thirty years, and is attacked by Cha-Cha and Hazel. Diego's former friend, Detective Eudora Patch, investigates the deaths at the doughnut shop, but her only witness has already been interrogated by Diego. As Allison (Number Three) watches old surveillance videos of her childhood to cheer herself up, she finds a disturbing tape of her father. It is revealed that in the apocalyptic future, Five found his siblings dead and removes the prosthetic eye from Luther's clutch.
3	3	"Extra Ordinary"	Andrew Bernstein	Ben Nedivi & Matt Wolpert	February 15, 2019
After Allison shows Luther the videotape of what looks like Grace, the siblings' android "mother", serving poisoned tea to their father, the two ask their mother about the incident. The android claims to remember nothing about it, but the siblings suspect that she is hiding something. Vanya struggles with her violin skill and she and Leonard get to know each other better. Number Five starts an observation of the manufacturer of the prosthetic eye. Agnes, the waitress at the doughnut cafe, describes the umbrella tattoo of Number Five to Cha-Cha and Hazel, leading them to the Hargreeves's house. As Luther and Allison gather the rest of their siblings to watch the footage, Diego reveals he took the monocle from Grace after the funeral and threw it away. The siblings disagree on whether to turn off Grace or not. Cha-Cha and Hazel break into the Hargreeves's house and attack Luther, Diego, Allison, and Vanya, but flee and kidnap Klaus when the siblings fight back. Diego finally turns off Grace, as she is totally oblivious of the fight and shows other malfunctions.
4	4	"Man on the Moon"	Ellen Kuras	Lauren Schmidt Hissrich	February 15, 2019
Seven years ago, Hargreeves sends Luther on a mission that goes severely wrong. To save his life, Hargreeves injects Luther with a serum that also transforms his body into that of an ape. In the present, Allison and Luther find the deactivated Grace and assume the hit-men shut her off. Leonard and Vanya bond and agree to go to dinner. Meanwhile, Cha-Cha and Hazel torture Klaus to get information about Five. When they begin to destroy Klaus's drugs, he gives up information, and after sobering up, he begins to see their dead victims. Five threatens the man from Meritech to get more information about the prosthetic eye. Cha-Cha and Hazel, now aware of Five's investigation, go to the lab and set it aflame. Diego and Luther find Five passed out drunk. Patch goes to the motel to search for the two hit-men and frees Klaus but gets killed by Cha-Cha. Klaus escapes through the vents with the briefcase. As he opens the briefcase, he time travels.
5	5	"Number Five"	Ellen Kuras	Bob DeLaurentis	February 15, 2019
A flashback shows Number Five's life in the apocalyptic future. He is eventually approached by the Handler, representing an organization called the Commission. She offers him a job. He works some time for them by killing people throughout history until he finds a way to return to the present day. Allison suspects that Leonard is hiding something and makes inquiries, but Vanya dismisses her concerns and becomes angry with her. Vanya stops taking her pills. When she auditions for the first chair in her orchestra, she gets it, but at the same time, a mysterious power within her appears. Klaus destroys the briefcase after returning from his time travel. He fought in the Vietnam War, lost someone close to him, and is heavily traumatized. Luther and Number Five trick the hit-men into setting up a meeting with the Handler in exchange for a different briefcase. She offers Number Five a new job, which he accepts under the condition that his family survives. Vanya gets first chair and tells Leonard. Unbeknownst to her, he killed the former first chair violinist. Pogo reactivates Grace and asks her to keep a secret from the kids.
6	6	"The Day That Wasn't"	Stephen Surjik	Sneha Koorse	February 15, 2019
Klaus's time jump lands him in the Vietnam War, where he falls in love with a soldier named Dave. Cha-Cha is sent orders to terminate Hazel, and the Handler takes Five to the Commission's headquarters. Luther informs the Academy about the impending apocalypse but fails to inspire the group to fight. Vanya is angry at being excluded - she unknowingly causes a rainstorm and bends several streetlamps with her emerging powers. Klaus asks Diego to help him sober up, hoping to see Dave's ghost before the world ends. Luther feels betrayed when he discovers his Moon research was pointless. Diego is shocked to discover that Grace has been reactivated. Luther and Allison confess their romantic feelings. Five intercepts orders to protect a man named Harold Jenkins and sends orders to Cha-Cha and Hazel, telling each to kill the other. Vanya discovers her father's notebook at Leonard's house, reads it, and learns her father knew about her powers and suppressed them. Five steals a time-traveling briefcase and flees the Commission. He arrives at the beginning of the episode, altering the timeline, and rallies his siblings to stop the apocalypse.
7	7	"The Day That Was"	Stephen Surjik	Ben Nedivi & Matt Wolpert	February 15, 2019
In 1989, Harold Jenkins is born from a normal pregnancy although his mother dies in labor. Harold idolizes the Umbrella Academy and believes he is like them; Reginald rejects Harold, telling him there is nothing special about him. Harold murders his abusive and alcoholic father and is sentenced to 12 years in prison. Five reveals they must locate Harold and stop him from causing the apocalypse. Diego learns that he is the prime suspect for Detective Patch's murder and Allison recognizes Harold as Leonard from a police file. Diego, Allison, and Five break into Leonard's house, discovering destroyed Umbrella Academy memorabilia, but their hunt is cut short after Five passes out from a shrapnel wound. Luther becomes depressed upon learning the truth behind his mission to the Moon. He goes to a rave where he gets intoxicated. Klaus follows him and is knocked unconscious in a fight. He sees Reginald, who tells him that Klaus has not fully seen the potential of his powers, and that he orchestrated his own death in order to bring the six children together. Hazel receives orders to kill Cha-Cha but instead incapacitates her. Leonard and Vanya are harassed by a trio of thugs. They beat up Leonard, causing Vanya's powers to burst, killing two of them. Leonard recovers in the hospital, having lost his right eye in the event, while Allison goes looking for Vanya, and Diego is arrested.
8	8	"I Heard a Rumor"	Jeremy Webb	Lauren Schmidt Hissrich & Sneha Koorse	February 15, 2019
Unable to find Vanya, Allison accompanies a police officer investigating the attack on Leonard and Vanya under the guise that she is researching an acting role. As Leonard and Vanya leave the hospital, they learn that the third assailant survived. Allison and the officer question the assailant and learn that Leonard paid the thugs to attack him. Detective Beaman helps Diego break out of prison. Hazel runs away with Agnes, going on the trip she had always planned. Upon arriving at their first stop, he leaves her to take care of an issue but promises to return. Cha-Cha goes to Agnes' donut shop and discovers where they are heading. Leonard and Vanya go to the woods to train Vanya to develop her abilities, which grow stronger as she flashes back to her childhood training with Reginald. Reginald feared her powers were too great, so he isolated her and began medicating her to stabilize her emotions. Allison finally finds Vanya at the cabin and confesses that Reginald asked her to use her powers to convince Vanya she was ordinary. Vanya lashes out with her violin bow, slicing Allison's throat with her power. Leonard takes Vanya away and they leave Allison unconscious and bleeding.
9	9	"Changes"	Jeremy Webb	Bob DeLaurentis & Eric W. Phillips	February 15, 2019
A young Vanya uses her powers to attack several nannies before Reginald ultimately builds Grace. Leonard takes Vanya back to his home, where she is riddled with guilt. Allison is rescued by her brothers and survives. However, she is unable to speak. Klaus tries to get high again, prompting Ben to punch Klaus in the face and revealing that Ben was able to make physical contact thanks to Klaus' powers. At Leonard's, Vanya discovers Reginald's diary. Realizing Leonard's manipulation, she kills him in a fit of rage. His body is discovered by Vanya's siblings and Five matches the glass eye to Leonard. Hazel arrives at the Umbrella Academy to volunteer to help stop the apocalypse but learns from Five that with Jenkins dead, it is done. Hazel reveals Cha-Cha to be Patch's killer and leaves their guns to help exonerate Diego. Hazel returns to Agnes, only to find Cha-Cha has taken her hostage. Their fight is interrupted by the Handler. Allison awakes and reveals that Vanya has powers. Vanya returns to the house and Luther incapacitates her before locking her in an isolation chamber. The others protest but Luther refuses to release her. Heartbroken and furious, Vanya gives in to her dark powers and breaks out.
10	10	"The White Violin"	Peter Hoar	Steve Blackman	February 15, 2019
The opening sequence establishes “Reggie”'s origin on another planet. In the present, Vanya destroys the mansion, killing Pogo after he admits to knowing the truth about her. Ben manifests physically, saving Diego from falling debris. Grace is destroyed when the building collapses. Five realizes that Vanya is the Apocalypse; the siblings regroup at a bowling alley. The Handler orders Hazel and Cha-Cha to protect Vanya, promising Hazel a life with Agnes. Realizing it's a lie, he incapacitates Cha-Cha, shoots the Handler and embraces Agnes. Luther calls Claire for Allison, who cannot talk, speaking words of love to Allison. Commission troops attack the bowling alley and follow the siblings to the Icarus Theatre, where Vanya's concert is underway. The siblings have failed to stop her. Ben manifests through Klaus and defeats the gunmen, but Vanya traps the brothers in her energy. Allison breaks her concentration with the sound of a gunshot. Vanya's accumulated energy is redirected out into space, shattering the moon and causing the Apocalypse. Five suggests that they all travel back in time and try again, this time “fixing” Vanya. As the world is consumed, Hazel and Agnes—and the Umbrella Academy—escape into the past, while the world burns.

== Production ==
=== Development ===
A film version of the comic book series The Umbrella Academy was optioned by Universal Studios. Originally, screenwriter Mark Bomback was hired to write the screenplay; Rawson Marshall Thurber reportedly replaced him in 2010. There had been little talk of the film from that time. In an interview with Newsarama at the 2012 New York Comic Con, Way mentioned that there have been "good talks" and a "really good script", but that it was "kind of up to the universe".

On July 7, 2015, it was announced that The Umbrella Academy would be developed into a television series, rather than an original film, produced by Universal Cable Productions. On July 11, 2017, it was officially announced that Netflix had greenlit a live-action series adaptation of The Umbrella Academy premiering in 2019, with Way and Bá acting as executive producers. Jeremy Slater wrote the script for the pilot episode, and Steve Blackman serves as showrunner. The first season of The Umbrella Academy was released on Netflix on February 15, 2019.

=== Casting ===
On November 9, 2017, Netflix confirmed that Elliot Page had joined the cast and that he would play Vanya Hargreeves, also known as the White Violin. On November 30, 2017, it was revealed that Tom Hopper, David Castañeda, Emmy Raver-Lampman, Robert Sheehan and Aidan Gallagher had joined the cast as the rest of the Hargreeves siblings. On February 12, 2018, Netflix announced that Academy Award nominee Mary J. Blige would appear in the series as the sadistic time-travel assassin Cha-Cha. Colm Feore joined the cast as Sir Reginald Hargreeves, the adoptive father of the siblings, on February 16, 2018, alongside Cameron Britton, Adam Godley and Ashley Madekwe. On February 28, 2018, it was announced that John Magaro has been cast as a series regular character.

=== Filming ===
Principal photography for the first season began on January 15, 2018, in Toronto. Gerard Way posted on his Instagram account an illustration by Fabio Moon of the cast and crew doing the first table read of the script in Toronto. He also revealed a picture of the first day on the set. Additional filming took place in Hamilton, Ontario.

For the theatre where Vanya performed with her violin, the crew used the Elgin Theatre, alongside the Winter Garden Theatre. Mazzoleni Concert Hall was used to represent the theatre's exterior. The exterior of the mansion was filmed at a building in Hamilton, while the interiors were filmed in studio. The Joey & Toby Tanenbaum Opera Centre was filmed for an outside scene and LIUNA Station was used for a bank robbery scene. A laboratory at the University of Toronto was filmed to represent the Meritech Prosthetics building. The filming concluded on July 18, 2018.

=== Visual effects ===
Visual effects for the series are handled by SpinVFX, Weta Digital, Folks VFX, Soho VFX, Pixomondo, Deluxe VFX, Digital Film Tree, BOT VFX, Studio 8, Exceptional Minds and MARZ

VFX supervisor Everet Burrell confirmed that he used traditional art techniques for early concept art and referenced great actors with iconic faces. Burrell called Weta Digital, who previously worked for the rebooted Planet of the Apes series, to develop the visual effects for the character of Pogo. Ken Hall provided the motion capture for Pogo using a gray suit to later make additions to his captures to create the CGI of the chimpanzee, with Adam Godley making the facial expressions and voice acting of the character.

SpinVFX confirmed that they delivered at least 563 shots for the series. To make the effects of the show, the team required a series of complex effect simulations, creature development, and massive destructions.

For the effects of Number Five jumping through time and space, Burrell wanted to make the effects look organic, and liquidy, representing how much time and the world bends around him when he jumps, and how quick it should be. For these effects, he used more than 30 frames in the first episodes, however with the progress of the series, this reduced to only 10 frames. To that footage, the team iterated on several kinds of spatial jump effects, all the way from heavy distortion to subtler images. The visual effects team started with some R&D tests. At the end, the final effect, called the "jelly vision", was used to make the series, with Burrell expressing: "as if you're pushing your hand through a jelly membrane, just for a few seconds, and then it pops. It's really, really subtle, but you get a little bit of texture, you get a little bit of striations, almost like the universe is bending as he does his spatial jumps."

In an interview with Burrell he confirmed that to develop the sequences where time is frozen, they took several background shots on location before returning to their stage to shoot the dialogue between Five and The Handler in front of a green screen. They called this effect "Three-Strip" in honor of the Technicolor process used in the 1930s.

=== Music ===
The show’s score album, composed by Jeff Russo, was released on February 15, 2019, consecutively with the first season’s release. During an interview he revealed that the crew needed to use a subtle hand with the score and that he wanted the score to be thematic, by not trying to push too much on the weird and too much on the horrific aspect of the show and the story.

All music is composed by Jeff Russo except where noted.

The Umbrella Academy (Original Series Soundtrack)
No.	Title	Length
1.	"Russia 1989"	1:22
2.	"Sudden Birth"	1:36
3.	"Hazel and Cha Cha"	1:38
4.	"The Umbrella Academy"	5:17
5.	"Homecoming"	1:50
6.	"Klaus"	2:21
7.	"Hazel and Agnes"	2:01
8.	"Goodbye Dolores"	1:46
9.	"The Day That Wasn't"	3:23
10.	"Vanya Locked Up"	6:10
11.	"Vanya Orchestra"	1:48
12.	"Vanya Orchestra"	1:12
13.	"Apocalypse"	6:27
14.	"Dancing"	2:40
15.	"Vanya"	3:11

The Umbrella Academy (Original Series Soundtrack) [Deluxe Edition]
No.	Title	Music	Length
16.	"Stormy Weather"	Emmy Raver-Lampman	3:24
17.	"Stay with Me"	Mary J. Blige	3:26

== Reception ==
=== Audience viewership ===
On April 16, 2019, Netflix announced that the series had been streamed by over 45 million viewers on its service within its first month of release, with people at least having watched 70% percent of one episode of the series. It was the third most popular TV series on Netflix in 2019, falling behind The Witcher and the third season of Stranger Things.

=== Critical response ===
On the review aggregator Rotten Tomatoes, 77% of 94 critic reviews are positive for the first season, with an average rating of 7.2/10. Critics' consensus on the website reads, "The Umbrella Academy unfurls an imaginative yarn with furtive emotion and an exceptionally compelling ensemble, but the series' dour sensibility often clashes with its splashy genre trappings." Metacritic, which uses a weighted average, assigned the season a score of 61 out of 100 based on 22 critics, indicating "generally favorable" reviews.

Merrill Barr from Forbes praised the series, and wrote, "If you're looking for a pulpy show with lots of action, melodramatic plotting and eccentric characters then The Umbrella Academy is your ticket." Lorraine Ali from Los Angeles Times in a positive review wrote, "The Umbrella Academy stands out among the countless other superhero series splashed across billboards and your viewing queues." Catherine Gee from the Daily Telegraph gave the series a positive response and commented, "If it does return for a second run, it would be nice to see some more genuinely fresh ideas - without the over-reliance on tried, tested and tired tropes from years past." Adam Graham from The Detroit News commented the series is a worthy enrollment, praising the series for its themes about a dysfunctional family and the characters. Kambole Campbell from Little White Lies considered the series as something to enjoy with a plenty of surprises for someone who has not read the comics, and praised the way that the series interpreted the abusive parental childhood relationship and how at the end this affects the children in their adulthood.

Some critics pointed out similarities between The Umbrella Academy, DC Universe's Doom Patrol and Marvel Comics's X-Men series, both positively and negatively.

Some Jewish writers have criticized The Umbrella Academy for its portrayal of the Handler. In particular, her use of a Yiddish idiom and her membership in a secret society that discreetly causes catastrophic events were together perceived as an antisemitic stereotype of Jewish people secretly and malevolently controlling world events. Amanda Bowman, Vice President of the Board of Deputies of British Jews, wrote that "The use of a Yiddish saying by the evil boss of an organisation which controls the world's timeline is clearly an anti-Semitic trope."

=== Accolades ===
Year	Association	Category	Nominee(s)	Result	Ref.
2019	Teen Choice Awards	Choice Sci-Fi/Fantasy TV Actress	Elliot Page	Nominated	
2019	Saturn Awards	Best Streaming Superhero Television Series	The Umbrella Academy	Nominated	
2019	Saturn Awards	Best Supporting Actress in a Streaming Presentation	Elliot Page	Nominated	
2019	Primetime Emmy Awards	Outstanding Production Design for a Narrative Contemporary Program (One Hour or More)	Mark Worthington, Mark Steel & Jim Lambie (for "We Only See Each Other at Weddings and Funerals")	Nominated	
2019	Primetime Emmy Awards	Outstanding Special Visual Effects	Everett Burrell, Chris White, Jeff Campbell, Sebastien Bergeron, Sean Schur, Steve Dellerson, Libby Hazell, Carrie Richardson & Misato Shinohara (for "The White Violin")	Nominated	
2019	People's Choice Awards	The Bingeworthy Show of 2019	The Umbrella Academy	Nominated	
2019	People's Choice Awards	The Sci-Fi/Fantasy Show of 2019	The Umbrella Academy	Nominated	
2019	MTV Movie & TV Awards	Best Musical Moment	The Umbrella Academy	Nominated	
2020	Visual Effects Society Awards	Outstanding Animated Character in an Episode or Real-Time Project	Aidan Martin, Craig Young, Olivier Beierlein & Laurent Herveic (for "Pilot; Pogo")	Nominated	
2020	Casting Society of America	Television Pilot & First Season – Drama	Junie Lowry Johnson, Libby Goldstein, April Webster, Robin D. Cook, Samantha Garrabrant, Josh Ropiequet & Jonathan Oliveira	Nominated	
2020	Art Directors Guild Awards	One-Hour Contemporary Single-Camera Series	Mark Worthington (for "We Only See Each Other at Weddings and Funerals")	Won	
