= The Umbrella Academy season 2 =

The Umbrella Academy
- Season 2
- Promotional poster
- Starring: Elliot Page (Note: Initially credited as Ellen Page in the first and second seasons, Netflix updated the onscreen credits from Ellen to Elliot for those seasons within a week (by December 8, 2020) of Page announcing his name change. Also changed were Page's credits in other works in Netflix's exclusive library of streaming products, including the films Tallulah (2016) and Flatliners (2017), and the miniseries Tales of the City (2019).); Tom Hopper; David Castañeda; Emmy Raver-Lampman; Robert Sheehan; Aidan Gallagher; Justin H. Min; Ritu Arya; Yusuf Gatewood; Marin Ireland; Adam Godley; Kate Walsh; Colm Feore
- No. of episodes: 10

Release
- Original network: Netflix
- Original release: July 31, 2020

Season chronology
- ← Previous; Season 1 Next → Season 3

The second season of the superhero comedy drama television series The Umbrella Academy was released on Netflix on July 31, 2020, and consisted of 10 episodes. Created for television by Steve Blackman and developed by Jeremy Slater, the series is an adaptation of the comic book series of the same name written by Gerard Way and illustrated by Gabriel Bá, both of whom serve as executive producers on the series. The second season adapts the second story arc of the comics, Dallas, and revolves around the Hargreeves siblings being scattered throughout the '60s in Dallas, reuniting to put a stop to yet another incoming apocalypse caused by their timeline interference.

The second season features Elliot Page, Tom Hopper, David Castañeda, Emmy Raver-Lampman, Robert Sheehan, Aidan Gallagher, Justin H. Min, Ritu Arya, Yusuf Gatewood, Marin Ireland, Adam Godley, Kate Walsh, and Colm Feore as a part of the main cast, while Kevin Rankin, Jordan Claire Robbins, Justin Paul Kelly, John Kapelos, and Kris Holden-Ried appear in recurring roles. This season received positive reviews, with much praise to the music, humor, action sequences, character dynamics, and pacing, and many deeming it an improvement over the first season.

== Cast and characters ==
=== Main ===
- Elliot Page as Vanya Hargreeves / Number Seven
  - T.J. McGibbon as young Vanya
- Tom Hopper as Luther Hargreeves / Number One
  - Cameron Brodeur as young Luther
- David Castañeda as Diego Hargreeves / Number Two
  - Blake Talabis as young Diego
- Emmy Raver-Lampman as Allison Hargreeves / Number Three
  - Eden Cupid as young Allison
- Robert Sheehan as Klaus Hargreeves / Number Four
  - Dante Albidone as young Klaus
- Aidan Gallagher as Number Five
- Justin H. Min as Ben Hargreeves / Number Six
  - Ethan Hwang as young Ben
  - Min also portrays an alternate version of Ben (Number Two) that appears as a part of the Sparrow Academy in the final episode.
- Ritu Arya as Lila Pitts
- Yusuf Gatewood as Raymond "Ray" Chestnut
- Marin Ireland as Sissy Cooper
- Adam Godley as Pogo
- Kate Walsh as The Handler
- Colm Feore as Sir Reginald Hargreeves

=== Recurring ===
- Kevin Rankin as Elliott Gussman
- Jordan Claire Robbins as Grace
- Justin Paul Kelly as Harlan Cooper
- John Kapelos as Jack Ruby
- Kris Holden-Ried as Axel
- Jason Bryden as Otto
- Tom Sinclair as Oscar
- Stephen Bogaert as Carl Cooper
- Ken Hall as Herb
- Dov Tiefenbach as Keechie
- Robin Atkin Downes as A.J. Carmichael
- Mouna Traoré as Jill

== Episodes ==
No. overall	No. in season	Title	Directed by	Teleplay by	Original release date
11	1	"Right Back Where We Started"	Sylvain White	Steve Blackman	July 31, 2020
Five's time travel goes awry, scattering his siblings between February 1960 and October 1963 in Dallas. Five arrives there on November 25, 1963, minutes before a nuclear doomsday which he later surmises is linked to JFK not being assassinated. He finds his siblings battling Soviet soldiers, when an elderly Hazel appears, explains to Five that the nuclear missiles in the sky are the apocalypse, and that the Hargreeves siblings have ten days to stop it. They time travel back with the help of a briefcase, but three Swedish assassins (Axel, Otto, and Oscar) arrive and kill Hazel, who slips a roll of film in Five's back pocket before he dies. Five space travels, ending up in the house of a man named Elliott, who agrees to help Five. The other siblings' lives are revealed: Luther is a bodyguard for Jack Ruby; Diego is a mental asylum inmate and wants to prevent the JFK assassination; Allison (whose voice has healed) has married a civil rights activist named Ray; Klaus, still accompanied by Ben, has (accidentally) started a cult; and Vanya, who has amnesia, is living with a married couple, Sissy and Carl, and is the nanny of their son Harlan. After being chased by the Swedes, Diego escapes the asylum with Lila, a friend and fellow patient. Five finds Luther at Ruby's club and tells him about the situation, but Luther refuses to help.
12	2	"The Frankel Footage"	Stephen Surjik	Mark Goffman	July 31, 2020
Three months after being shot by Hazel, the Handler returns to the Commission and learns that she has been demoted by her boss, a talking fish named AJ. Carl is drunk at Jack Ruby's club – Vanya goes there to pick him up and Luther spots her. At Elliott's house, Five, Diego, and Lila watch a film that Hazel slipped into Five's pocket just before dying. Diego and Five see Reginald in the film holding an umbrella on Dealey Plaza, presumably during Kennedy's assassination. Ray is arrested, he and Klaus bond in jail, and Klaus gets released shortly after. When Allison visits Ray in jail, she notices someone with the same hand tattoos as Klaus. Luther comes to Sissy's farm and apologizes to Vanya. She does not remember him, and he leaves. Diego and Five sneak into Reginald's company, and Five comes across a young Pogo. Diego and Reginald fight and Reginald stabs Diego before walking away.
13	3	"The Swedish Job"	Stephen Surjik	Jesse McKeown	July 31, 2020
Back at Elliott's house, Lila is able to save Diego, and they have sex. Vanya goes out for the night and is intercepted by the Swedes. They chase her in a cornfield, shooting at her, but she uses her powers to stop them. Five finds her in the morning and explains the situation, noting that her powers are still dormant. Allison reunites with Klaus, who sends Ben to spook the police into releasing Ray. At his home, Ray finds Luther looking for Allison, for whom he still has feelings. Luther leaves after finding out that she is married. Allison participates in a sit-in in a whites only diner, organized by Ray and other African-Americans. Klaus finds a younger Dave working at a paint store, and tells Ben that he wants to prevent Dave from enlisting in the military, which he did after the Kennedy assassination. Ray goes to the diner but is arrested with the rest of the protestors. Before fleeing the scene with Klaus, Allison uses her powers to make a police officer stop beating Ray, who then runs away from her, confused about who she truly is. Lila leaves Diego and arrives at a hotel, where it is revealed that she works for the Commission alongside the Handler, her adoptive mother.
14	4	"The Majestic 12"	Tom Verica	Bronwyn Garrity	July 31, 2020
Before returning to Diego, Lila is instructed by the Handler to protect Five at all costs. Vanya learns that she caused the original apocalypse and returns to the Cooper family. Allison is unable to explain to Ray what happened without revealing her power. She leaves and finds Luther, who tells her about the upcoming apocalypse. Diego, Lila, and Five visit a gala that Reginald is attending. Diego encounters a human Grace, who is romantically involved with Reginald. The trio is attacked by the Swedes and fight them off, but Reginald leaves during the chaos of the fight. Lila chooses to protect Five and leaves Diego to fight two of the Swedes. Harlan hears Vanya's plan to leave and runs away. She goes after him, finds his toy in a lake, and uses her powers to rescue him. Realizing that Harlan could die if she left, Vanya decides to stay. After failing to change Dave's mind about joining the Army, Klaus begins to drink and spends the night at Allison's. At Elliott's house, Luther, high on nitrous oxide, reveals to Elliott that the apocalypse will arrive in seven days.
15	5	"Valhalla"	Tom Verica	Robert Askins	July 31, 2020
Vanya begins an intimate relationship with Sissy. At Elliott's house, Luther tells Five and Diego that when he first arrived in Dallas, he went to the Academy to see Reginald. Reginald kicked him out, stating that he hates children and would never adopt seven of them. The trio regroups with the rest of the Academy to explain their current situation. Together, they search for Reginald, believing they all showed up in Dallas to save JFK. Having been kicked out of the group by Five, Lila goes back with the Handler to lure Five into meeting with them at an abandoned warehouse. The Swedes are lured by finding one of Diego's knives in a tree, but it is a trap and Oscar is blown up. Vanya leaves the Cooper family after learning that Sissy is still sleeping with Carl. Luther and Diego receive an invitation to a light supper with Reginald, Klaus returns to his cult, and Allison tells Ray everything.
16	6	"A Light Supper"	Ellen Kuras	Aeryn Michelle Williams	July 31, 2020
At the warehouse, The Handler tells Five that she will send his family safely back to 2019 if he kills the Commission's board at their quarterly meeting. The six siblings receive invitations to dine with Reginald, where they try to explain their current situation. Allison shows Ray her powers, Diego tells Grace that Reginald plans to kill JFK, and Carl spies on Sissy and Vanya as they make love in a car. Having been told by the Handler that Diego killed their brother, the two remaining Swedes visit Elliott, kill him, and leave the message "Öga för öga" (an eye for an eye) written with his blood. Five agrees to the Handler's deal.
17	7	"Öga for Öga"	Ellen Kuras	Nikki Schiefelbein	July 31, 2020
Having killed the Commission's board, Five is given 90 minutes to regroup with the rest of the Academy to go back to a normal timeline in 2019. The Handler assumes control over the Commission. Vanya decides to take Sissy and Harlan with her to the new timeline and Allison decides to take Ray. As Ray and Allison prepare to leave, they are attacked by the two remaining Swedes. Allison uses her powers to make Axel kill Otto, after which he leaves. Klaus allows Ben to briefly possess his body so that Ben can communicate with Jill, a cult member with whom he has fallen in love. Ben also shares an emotional reunion with Diego before Klaus ejects him from his body. Sissy, Harlan, and Vanya are stopped by multiple police officers; Sissy admits that she left a note for Carl before leaving. Vanya uses her powers to fight them but is knocked unconscious. Because the Academy did not regroup in time, Five is forced to throw away the time-traveling briefcase that contained the new timeline.
18	8	"The Seven Stages"	Amanda Marsalis	Mark Goffman & Jesse McKeown	July 31, 2020
Because she can speak Russian, Vanya is suspected of being a KGB spy and is interrogated by FBI Special Agent Willy Gibbs. Vanya is drugged and tortured with electrical shocks and begins to remember her past. Following up on Diego's information, Grace finds evidence that Reginald plans to harm JFK and breaks up with him. Lila kidnaps Diego to force him to work at the Commission and remain her boyfriend. Five meets with an older version of himself to try to get old-Five's time-traveling briefcase to return to a new timeline. Old-Five tells Luther his plan to prevent Vanya from causing the original apocalypse, a plan which would result in the death of young-Five. Herb, a Commission analyst, helps Diego to see what will occur on November 22, 1963. Vanya destroys an FBI building and JFK is not assassinated, which leads to World War III when the Soviets are believed to be the cause. With the help of Herb, Diego escapes and he, Klaus, and Allison return to Dallas to prevent Vanya from blowing up the building. However, the combination of the torture and return of her memories causes Vanya's power to start building towards the explosion.
19	9	"743"	Amanda Marsalis	Bronwyn Garrity & Robert Askins	July 31, 2020
Ben enters Vanya's mind and calms her, averting the explosion and the apocalypse. She hugs him as his ghostly form departs for the afterlife. Meanwhile, Harlan has experienced her torture. When Carl tries to take him, Sissy holds Carl at gunpoint. They struggle, and Harlan deflects the bullet headed towards him, killing Carl. Thanks to a clue from AJ, Herb uncovers kill order 743, under which old-Five killed Lila's parents. But when Lila confronts her mother about it, The Handler convinces Lila that Diego has been manipulating her, and after Lila agrees to kill The Academy, eats AJ. Young-Five and old-Five's battle to the death ends with old-Five going to 2019–and the accidental destruction of the briefcase. Because the FBI building wasn't destroyed, the parade continues, and JFK is assassinated. Diego tackles Reggie on the grassy knoll, but it is a double. Furious at the assassination, Reginald visits Majestic 12, peels off the mask that conceals his alien form, and kills them all. At the Commission, a monitor discovers a huge anomaly. The Handler kills him, and recalls all agents to prepare for war. A screen reveals the barn flashing with blue light, presumably from Harlan's powers.
20	10	"The End of Something"	Jeremy Webb	Steve Blackman	July 31, 2020
The Academy learns that they are wanted as terrorists for supposedly aiding in Kennedy's assassination. Sensing that Harlan is in trouble, Vanya and the others go to Sissy's farm. The Handler arrives with an army of Commission agents, and Vanya kills them all. Lila reveals that she can mirror the powers of the Academy, and they realize that she is another one of the forty-three children who were born on the same day; the Handler had Five murder her parents to get Lila for herself. The siblings reveal the truth to Lila before the Handler kills everyone and is in turn shot by Axel, the last Swede. Mortally wounded, Five reverses time by a few minutes and stops the Handler. Axel kills the Handler anyway, but agrees to end his hunt for the Academy while Lila escapes. Vanya takes her powers back from Harlan, but later she and Sissy mutually end their relationship due to Vanya's dangerous life. Herb, now leading the Commission, allows the Academy to use a briefcase to return to 2019. Ray receives a goodbye letter from Allison, Axel seeks a fresh start with Klaus's cult, Dave joins the Marines (instead of the Army), and Sissy begins a new life with Harlan, who retains telekinetic abilities. In an altered 2019, the Academy discovers that a still-alive Reginald formed the "Sparrow Academy" instead of the Umbrella Academy, consisting of five different children, a floating green cube, and a still-alive Ben.

== Production ==
=== Development ===
Following the success of the first season, on April 2, 2019, the series was renewed for a second season, which was released on July 31, 2020. It was also confirmed that the second season will consist of ten episodes, like the previous season. The season release date remained unknown until May 18, 2020, when a teaser trailer concept was released where the main cast danced to "I Think We're Alone Now" by Tiffany. Steve Blackman confirmed to The Hollywood Reporter that he wants to stay in the course of what the comics are doing without deviating too much. On June 26 it was revealed that the series will be taking place at the 60s in Dallas, due to the time travel from the end of the previous season.

=== Casting ===
Following the renewal, Elliot Page, Tom Hopper, David Castañeda, Emmy Raver-Lampman, Robert Sheehan, and Aidan Gallagher were all confirmed to be returning to reprise their roles as the Hargreeves siblings. In January 2020, Justin H. Min and Kate Walsh were promoted to series regulars for the second season, following their recurring roles in the first season. On September 10, 2019, Netflix announced that three additional actors — Ritu Arya, Marin Ireland and Yusuf Gatewood — would join the cast. On October 17, 2019, John Kapelos announced that he would be joining the recurring cast as Jack Ruby, the man who killed Lee Harvey Oswald.

=== Filming ===
Principal photography for the second season began on June 16, 2019. Like the previous season, it was filmed in Toronto and Hamilton, Ontario, despite the series taking place in Dallas, Texas. Exterior shots were taken in Dallas such as the Dealey Plaza. Filming concluded on November 23, 2019.

=== Visual effects ===
The second season used 400 shots from the Folks VFX Montreal team under the guidance of VFX supervisor Laurent Spillemaecker to create time portal effects seen throughout the season, particularly Five's special ability. Meanwhile, Spillemaecker's crew recreated events surrounding JFK's fateful Dallas visit, while including The Umbrella Academy's superpower interactions. Pictures and references from the 60s were provided to create and later to be used as digital matte paintings and CG environments, to transform Canada into the show's setting, 1960s Dallas.

The opening scene of the second season, where the siblings fight the Soviets on a Dallas street, was the most complicated to do, being nearly completely CGI. It was released on a 360-degree bluescreen backlot set which was 15 feet tall and 200 feet by 60 feet. The only real things that weren't made of CGI, were the tank, soldiers, cast and the rubble on the ground. The set was LiDAR scanned so that the director, Sylvian White could walk around using a VR edition of the iPad. They used a Phantom running at 700 frames per second on a camera stick. The scene was also divided in seven parts, beginning with Number Five's arrival at 1963, and concluding before Diego's first lines. For safety reasons the crew couldn't fire the AK-47s at Diego so they were forced to do multiple passes.

=== Music ===
The show's score album, composed by Jeff Russo and Perrine Virgile, was released on November 6, 2020, a little over 3 months after the season's release.

All music is composed by Jeff Russo and Perrine Virgile.

The Umbrella Academy, Season 2 (Music from the Netflix Original Series)
No.	Title	Length
1.	"The Swedes"	1:23
2.	"Lila and Diego"	1:29
3.	"Allison's Sit In"	2:21
4.	"Klaus Practices Yoga"	1:41
5.	"Luther and Allison"	2:09
6.	"The Family is Reunited"	1:45
7.	"Ben Embodies Klaus"	1:46
8.	"Vanya and Sissy Kiss"	1:49
9.	"The Race Against Time"	1:47
10.	"Vanya is the Bomb"	2:02
11.	"The Family Tried to Stop Vanya"	4:20
12.	"Ben's Sacrifice"	3:45
13.	"Young Ben's Funeral"	3:25
14.	"Luckiest Man I Know"	1:23
15.	"One of Us"	2:19

== Reception ==
=== Audience viewership ===
On September 3, 2020, Netflix revealed the show broke numerous records in viewerships, following the second season debut. During the second season first week, the show was the most watched television series show on Netflix, being atop of the Nielsen ratings and thus confirming that 3 billion minutes of the show's two seasons were viewed. On October 21, 2020, Netflix published the Nielsen ratings and revealed that the show's second season was streamed by over 43 million viewers in its first 28 days. It made it the 6th most watched show of that year, behind shows like The Queen's Gambit and Ratched.

=== Critical response ===
For the second season, Rotten Tomatoes identified 91% of 89 reviews as positive, with an average rating of 7.9/10. The website's critical consensus states, "Proof that time can heal almost all wounds, The Umbrella Academy's exhilarating second season lightens its tonal load without losing its emotional core, giving the super siblings room to grow while doubling down on the time traveling fun." The season garnered a weighted average score of 67 out of 100 from 12 critics on Metacritic, signifying "generally favorable" reviews.

Scott Bryan from BBC commented, "The less you think about the plot, the more you enjoy the ride, and the funnier and more interesting it is too." Caroline Siede from The A.V. Club in a positive review wrote, "This season two premiere delivers a stronger, better version of The Umbrella Academy – one that finally starts to pay off the promise of the series." Laura Prudom of IGN praised the series for its action sequences, soundtrack, and the themes about family, and considered it an improvement on the previous season. Tom Long from The Detroit News gave a positive response for its representation of LGBT and race issues. Richard Lawson from The Vanity Fair praised the visual effects, and considered the season to be sleeker and more vivid than the first season. Sabrina Barr from The Independent commented: "Employing dry Wes Anderson-style humour and end-of-the-world exploits worthy of Heroes, the second season of The Umbrella Academy is just as – if not more – wacky than the first." Lacy Baugher of Paste praised the series for not being like any other superhero movie or series, giving a positive response about its family themes, and the siblings' struggles and addictions.

Despite some Jewish writers criticizing the character of The Handler for her use of antisemitic stereotypes in the first season, The Handler was again shown speaking Yiddish in the second season, leading some to complain that the show hadn't done enough to address Jewish viewers' concerns.

=== Accolades ===
Year	Association	Category	Nominee(s)	Result	Ref.
2020	Casting Society of America	Television Pilot & First Season – Drama	Junie Lowry Johnson, Libby Goldstein, April Webster, Robin D. Cook, Samantha Garrabrant, Josh Ropiequet & Jonathan Oliveira	Nominated	
2020	Art Directors Guild Awards	One-Hour Contemporary Single-Camera Series	Mark Worthington (for "We Only See Each Other at Weddings and Funerals")	Won	
2020	People's Choice Awards	The Sci-Fi/Fantasy Show of 2020	The Umbrella Academy	Nominated	
2021	Critics' Choice Super Awards	Best Superhero Series	The Umbrella Academy	Nominated	
2021	Hollywood Music in Media Awards	Best Music Supervision – Television	Jen Malone	Nominated	
2021	GLAAD Media Awards	Outstanding Drama Series	The Umbrella Academy	Nominated	
2021	Annie Awards	Best Character Animation – Live Action	Aidan Martin, Hunter Parks, Craig Young, Viki Yeo & Krystal Sae Eua	Nominated	
2021	Motion Picture Sound Editors Awards	Outstanding Achievement in Sound Editing – Episodic Short Form – Dialogue/ADR	John Benson & Jason Krane (for "The End of Something")	Nominated	
2021	Motion Picture Sound Editors Awards	Outstanding Achievement in Sound Editing – Episodic Short Form – Music	Jen Malone & Lodge Worster (for "Valhalla")	Nominated	
2021	MTV Movie & TV Awards	Best Performance in a Show	Elliot Page	Nominated	
2021	Saturn Awards	Best Superhero Adaptation Television Series	The Umbrella Academy	Nominated	
2021	Primetime Emmy Awards	Outstanding Cinematography for a Single-Camera Series (One Hour)	Neville Kidd (for "Right Back Where We Started")	Nominated	
2021	Primetime Emmy Awards	Outstanding Fantasy/Sci-Fi Costumes	Christopher Hargadon, Heather Crepp, William Ng & Jane Fieber (for "The Frankel Footage")	Nominated	
2021	Primetime Emmy Awards	Outstanding Sound Editing for a Comedy or Drama Series (One-Hour)	John Benson, Jason Krane, John Snider, AJ Shapiro, Dario Biscaldi, Lodge Worster, Lindsay Pepper & Zane D. Bruce (for "The End of Something")	Nominated	
2021	Primetime Emmy Awards	Outstanding Special Visual Effects in a Single Episode	Everett Burrell, Phillip Hoffman, Jesse Kawzenuk, Christopher Stack, Sophie Vertigan, Jeff Campbell, Laurent Spillemaecker, R. Christopher White & Ryan Freer (for "743")	Nominated	
