= The Umbrella Academy (TV series) =

American superhero television series (2019–2024)

- Genre: Action; Comedy drama; Science fantasy; Superhero
- Created by: Steve Blackman
- Based on: The Umbrella Academy by: Gerard Way; and Gabriel Bá
- Developed by: Jeremy Slater
- Showrunners: Steve Blackman; Jesse McKeown
- Starring: Elliot Page (Note: Initially credited as Ellen Page in the first and second seasons, Netflix updated the onscreen credits to Elliot for those seasons within a week of Page announcing his name change in December 2020.); Tom Hopper; David Castañeda; Emmy Raver-Lampman; Robert Sheehan; Aidan Gallagher; Mary J. Blige; Cameron Britton; John Magaro; Adam Godley; Colm Feore; Justin H. Min; Ritu Arya; Yusuf Gatewood; Marin Ireland; Kate Walsh; Genesis Rodriguez; Britne Oldford
- Music by: Jeff Russo; Perrine Virgile
- Country of origin: United States
- Original language: English
- No. of seasons: 4
- No. of episodes: 36

Production
- Executive producers: Gerard Way; Gabriel Bá; Jeremy Slater; Scott Stuber; Beau Bauman; Mike Richardson; Keith Goldberg; Peter Hoar; Jeff F. King; Jeremy Webb; Steve Blackman; Jesse McKeown; Jennifer Cecil; Pascal Verschooris; Abbey Morris
- Producers: Kevin Lafferty; Sneha Koorse; Jamie Neese; Jason Neese; Ted Miller; Steve Wakefield; D. J. Carson; Elizabeth Padden; Lauren Otero
- Production locations: Toronto, Ontario; Hamilton, Ontario
- Cinematography: Neville Kidd; Craig Wrobleski; Michael Marshall; Fraser Brown
- Editors: Jon Dudkowski; Timothy A. Good; Amy Duddleston; Wendy Tzeng; Todd Desrosiers; Brian Beal; Amanda Panella; Franklin Peterson; Amy Bostrom; Miklos Wright; Carol Stutz; Scott Turner
- Running time: 40–69 minutes
- Production companies: Borderline Entertainment; Irish Cowboy; Dark Horse Entertainment; Universal Content Productions

Original release
- Network: Netflix
- Release: February 15, 2019 – August 8, 2024

The Umbrella Academy is an American superhero comedy drama television series loosely based on the comic book series of the same name written by Gerard Way, illustrated by Gabriel Bá, and published by Dark Horse Comics. Created for Netflix by Steve Blackman and developed by Jeremy Slater, it revolves around a dysfunctional family of adopted sibling superheroes who reunite for their father's funeral and the threat of an imminent apocalypse. The series was produced by Borderline Entertainment (season 1–2), Irish Cowboy (season 3), Dark Horse Entertainment, and Universal Content Productions.

The cast features Elliot Page, Tom Hopper, David Castañeda, Emmy Raver-Lampman, Robert Sheehan, Aidan Gallagher, Cameron Britton, Mary J. Blige, John Magaro, Adam Godley, Colm Feore, Justin H. Min, Ritu Arya, Yusuf Gatewood, Marin Ireland, Kate Walsh, Genesis Rodriguez, and Britne Oldford. The adaptation began development as a film optioned by Universal Pictures in 2011. It was eventually shelved in favor of a television series in 2015, before being officially greenlit by Netflix in July 2017. The series was filmed in Toronto and Hamilton, Ontario.

The first season was released on Netflix on February 15, 2019. In April 2019, Netflix reported that 45 million households had watched season one during its first month of release, thus becoming one of the most-streamed series of the year. The second and third seasons subsequently followed on July 31, 2020, and June 22, 2022, respectively. In August 2022, the series was renewed for a fourth and final season, which was released on August 8, 2024. Netflix gave seasons 1 and 2 a TV-14 rating, while seasons 3 and 4 received a TV-MA rating.

The first three seasons received positive reviews from critics, while the final season was met with a more mixed reception with many calling it an unsatisfying conclusion. The series has received a number of accolades, including six Emmy nominations.

== Plot summary ==
The Umbrella Academy is set in a universe where 43 women around the world gave birth simultaneously at noon on October 1, 1989, although none had shown any sign of pregnancy until labor began. Seven of the children are adopted by eccentric billionaire Sir Reginald Hargreeves and turned into a superhero team that he calls "The Umbrella Academy." Hargreeves gives the children numbers rather than names, but their robot-mother, Grace, later names six of them: Luther, Diego, Allison, Klaus, Ben, and Vanya. (Note: In the third season, the character was renamed to Viktor, following the actor Elliot Page's transition.) Reginald puts six of the children to work fighting crime but keeps Vanya apart from her siblings' activities, claiming she demonstrates no powers of her own.

The first season is set in the present day, where Luther is part ape and has lived on the Moon for four years; Allison is a famous actress; Vanya is a violinist; Klaus has a drug addiction; Five disappeared seventeen years earlier; Ben, now deceased, is a ghost able to converse only with Klaus; Diego has become a vigilante. The estranged siblings learn that Reginald has died and gather for his funeral. Five returns from the future, revealing that a global apocalypse is imminent, but is chased by time-travelling Commission operatives Hazel and Cha-Cha. The reunited siblings try to uncover the secrets behind Reginald Hargreeves' life, and their dysfunctional relationships are strained. They band together to try to prevent the impending apocalypse.

The second season sees the siblings scattered in Dallas at different times in the early 1960s (as a result of the events of the first season), establishing lives for themselves. Five arrives there on November 25, 1963, minutes before a nuclear doomsday that is linked to JFK not being assassinated, but with the help of Hazel manages to travel back ten days. Five is hunted by a trio of Swedish assassins but finds his siblings, who have all made new lives, and attempts to reunite them in order to stop this new apocalypse.

In the third season, the siblings realize their actions in the past created a new timeline and returning to 2019 is vastly different where they have been replaced by another Hargreeves superhero group adopted by Reginald, dubbed "The Sparrow Academy". They also have to find a way to stop a kugelblitz from consuming and destroying the universe created as a result of the grandfather paradox the siblings caused through their time-travel. They successfully reset the universe, while losing their powers in the process, and go their separate ways.

In the final season, the siblings reconnect with the goal of stopping the "Cleanse". They also regain their powers in the process, and some have augmented or completely different powers. At the end they eventually realize that the only way to save the timeline is to erase themselves from the universe. They come to terms with this fact and let the Cleanse happen, resetting all timelines back to a single – normal – timeline, removing all traces of the Umbrella Academy's existence.

== Cast and characters ==
=== Main ===
- Elliot Page as Viktor/Vanya Hargreeves / Number Seven, a meek violinist, alienated from his siblings as he has no apparent supernatural abilities, who writes a damning tell-all book about his childhood. In reality, he can convert sound waves into physical force, an ability his father suppressed with drugs as he considered it too powerful and dangerous to control. The character was originally named Vanya and referred to as female until he comes out as a trans man in the third season, going then by Viktor and using he/him pronouns after the change. This change corresponds with Page's own transition in real life. T. J. McGibbon and Alyssa Gervasi portray the character as a teenager and a 4-year-old, respectively.
- Tom Hopper as Luther Hargreeves / Number One, an astronaut with super strength who lived on the Moon for four years on a mission from his father. He was severely injured during a mission and is the only sibling who did not leave the team. To save his life, Reginald injected him with a serum derived from a gorilla that turned his upper body into that of a gorilla. In season 1 and beginning of season 2, he secretly harbors romantic feelings for Allison. In season 3, he falls in love with Sloane. Cameron Brodeur portrays a younger Luther.
- David Castañeda as Diego Hargreeves / Number Two, a rebellious troublemaker with a mild telekinetic ability to curve the trajectory of moving objects, including knives and bullets. His jealousy of Luther for his father's affections led to him becoming a vigilante after leaving the Umbrella Academy. He starts a relationship with Lila in season 2, and eventually marries her and has three children with her in season 4. Blake Talabis portrays a younger Diego.
- Emmy Raver-Lampman as Allison Hargreeves / Number Three, a celebrity actress and mother with the ability to control minds and bend reality with the phrase "I heard a rumor ...". In season 3, she discovers she can now control minds without needing the phrase in moments of intense anger. Prior to her first marriage before season 1, she was romantically interested in Luther, and it is hinted that these feelings are continued in season 2. In season 2 she marries Raymond Chestnut. Eden Cupid and Jordana Blake portray Allison as a teenager and a 4-year-old, respectively.
- Robert Sheehan as Klaus Hargreeves / Number Four, a flamboyant drug addict possessing the ability to communicate with the dead and temporarily make them corporeal; he uses this ability to connect with Ben. In season 3, he discovers he also has the power of immortality and can thus revive himself and heal his own wounds after being killed, and even recreate his body if it is obliterated. Dante Albidone portrays a younger Klaus.
- Aidan Gallagher as Number Five, a boy with the ability to jump through space and time. After traveling to the future he ended up in a post-apocalyptic world, unable to get back. He survived on his own for decades before being recruited into The Commission, a secretive agency that keeps track of the established timeline of the world, finding and eliminating those who would threaten it. He eventually betrayed them in order to get back to his time (2019) to warn his family of the impending apocalypse. Returning to his time in the pilot episode causes him to revert to his 13-year-old body, played by Gallagher. Jim Watson plays an adult Five and Sean Sullivan portrays an elderly Five. In season 3, it is revealed that Five was the founder of the Commission, and a 100-year-old Five tells his younger self to not save the world a third time. In season 4, Five and Lila start a romantic relationship after getting trapped in alternate timelines for 7 years.
- Mary J. Blige as Cha-Cha (season 1), a Commission agent partnered with Hazel, she is "[a]ll-business" and the more sociopathic and ruthless of the two assassins who puts work above all else.
- Cameron Britton as Hazel (season 1; guest seasons 2 and 4), Cha-Cha's partner, a fellow assassin who is disillusioned with his life as an agent and leaves the Commission after falling in love with doughnut store-owner, Agnes. In season 2, an elderly Hazel appears to Five in 1963 to help him prevent doomsday.
- John Magaro as Leonard Peabody / Harold Jenkins (season 1), Vanya's (Note: Before transitioning to Viktor.) love interest in season 1. As a child, he was an admirer of the Umbrella Academy and begged to join, since he was born on the same day but was the result of a normal pregnancy, and in his childhood was publicly humiliated and rejected by Reginald. He later discovers Reginald's diary, detailing Vanya's potential, and inserts himself into her life with the goal of manipulating her into discovering and using her powers against the other Hargreeves siblings. However, Vanya kills him after discovering his ruse. Jesse Noah Gruman portrays a younger Harold.
- Adam Godley as Phinneus Pogo (seasons 1–3; guest season 4), an intelligent chimpanzee who is Reginald's close assistant. Godley provides the voice and facial performance capture, while Ken Hall serves as body-double for the motion capture to play the character on set. In season 2, a younger version of Pogo appears in 1963, who is treated like a son by Reginald and Grace.
  - Godley also portrays Pogo in the season 3 alternative timeline, where he left the Sparrow Academy because he grew disillusioned with Reginald, and became a tattoo artist.
- Colm Feore as Sir Reginald Hargreeves, the Umbrella Academy's adoptive father and a billionaire industrialist who died in 2019 by suicide, leading to the planned reunion of his children. In the alternate timeline, he is revealed to still be alive, having founded the Sparrow Academy after disliking the Umbrella Academy when they meet in 1963 and deciding to adopt different children instead in 1989. However, the new academy has kept him under control by giving him pills under Pogo's instructions so that Reginald wouldn't send them on their most dangerous mission.
- Justin H. Min as Ben Hargreeves / Number Six (season 2; recurring season 1), the deceased member of the Academy who can summon tentacled horrors from his body. Ben died on a mission, referred to as "the Jennifer incident", but appears regularly to Klaus and helps him occasionally, although the other children don't believe Klaus when he tells them Ben is still around. Ethan Hwang portrays a younger Ben.
  - Min also portrays Ben Hargreeves / Sparrow Number Two (seasons 2–4), an alternate version of Ben who, like his Umbrella counterpart, was adopted by Reginald alongside five other children, a result of Reginald not knowing about him in season 2. This Ben is still alive in 2019 as a member of the Sparrow Academy, with no memory of the Umbrella Academy.
- Ritu Arya as Lila Pitts (seasons 2–4), Diego's love interest and The Handler's adopted daughter who is revealed to be one of the super-powered children born on the same day. Originally, her powers allow her to mirror someone else's, but in season 4, she has gained the ability to project green lasers from her eyes. In season 3, she is pregnant by Diego. In season 4, she and Diego are married with three children, but she has an affair with Five after they both get stuck in alternate timelines for 7 years. Raya Korah and Anjana Vernuganan portray Lila as a teenager and a 4-year-old, respectively.
- Yusuf Gatewood as Raymond Chestnut (season 2; recurring season 3), Allison's second husband in season 2 and a 1960s civil rights activist. At the end of season 3, he becomes the father of Allison's daughter in the reset universe, but has left her by the time of season 4.
- Marin Ireland as Sissy Cooper (season 2; guest season 3), Vanya's love interest in season 2 who takes Vanya in when Vanya arrives in the 1960s and is hit by Sissy's car. She is also Harlan's mother and trapped in an abusive marriage with Carl.
- Kate Walsh as The Handler (season 2; recurring season 1; special guest seasons 3–4), the head of the Commission and Five's former boss. The Handler is also Lila's adopted mother, as she used the Commission to kill her parents and claim Lila for herself to use her powers. Walsh makes a speaking-only cameo in season 3 in the form of a letter to Lila.
- Genesis Rodriguez as Sloane Hargreeves / Sparrow Number Five (season 3), a member of the Sparrow Academy with the ability to manipulate gravity, who falls in love with Luther and later marries him.
- Britne Oldford as Fei Hargreeves / Sparrow Number Three (season 3), a member of the Sparrow Academy with the ability to control crows. She is blind and uses the crows as her eyes to spy on others.

=== Recurring ===
- Sheila McCarthy as Agnes Rofa (season 1; guest season 4), Hazel's love interest. She is the owner, waitress, and baker at Griddy's Doughnuts. Agnes died from cancer before the events of season 2 after 20 years with Hazel.
- Jordan Claire Robbins as Grace Hargreeves / Mom (seasons 1–3; guest season 4), a robot who acted as the mother of the Umbrella Academy children and has an especially close bond with Diego. She was built by Reginald after Vanya attacked several nannies. A human version of Grace was Reginald's girlfriend in 1963.
  - Robbins also portrays Grace in the alternate timeline, where she serves as a maid to the Sparrow Academy, but she gets corrupted by the Kugelblitz and sees it as a god.
- Ashley Madekwe as Detective Eudora Patch (season 1), Diego's former romantic partner who is killed by Cha-Cha.
- Peter Outerbridge as The Conductor (season 1), the leader of the orchestra which Vanya plays in.
- Rainbow Sun Francks as Detective Chuck Beaman (season 1), Eudora's colleague.
- Matt Biedel as Sgt. Dale Chedder (season 1), Eudora's colleague.
- Cody Ray Thompson (season 1, adult) and Calem MacDonald (season 2, teenager) as Dave Katz, Klaus' ill-fated lover during the Vietnam War whom he meets in season 1 when time-traveling, and later visits his younger self in 1963 prior to their meeting.
- Patrice Goodman as Dot (season 2; guest seasons 1, 3–4), a case manager for the Commission.
- Ken Hall as Herb (season 2; guest seasons 1, 3–4), an analytics specialist for the Commission.
- Kevin Rankin as Elliott (season 2), a conspiracy theorist who encounters and aids the Hargreeves in 1963.
- Kris Holden-Ried as Axel (season 2; guest season 4), the leader of a trio of Swedish triplet assassins working for the Commission.
- John Kapelos as Jack Ruby (season 2), a famous gangster in Dallas who employs Luther as his bodyguard.
- Stephen Bogaert as Carl Cooper (season 2), Sissy's abusive husband and Harlan's neglectful father.
- Raven Dauda as Odessa (season 2), owner of a Black beauty salon in South Dallas who takes Allison in when she arrives in 1961.
- Dewshane Williams as Miles (season 2), Raymond's friend and fellow civil rights activist.
- Jason Bryden as Otto (season 2; guest season 4), one of the triplet assassins.
- Tom Sinclair as Oscar (season 2; guest season 4), one of the triplet assassins.
- Justin Paul Kelly (season 2; guest season 3, child) and Callum Keith Rennie (season 3, adult) as Harlan Cooper / Lester Pocket, Sissy and Carl's eight-year-old son, who is nonverbal and has an unspecified disability. He is neglected by his father and finds a surrogate second parent in Vanya. After Vanya saves him from drowning, he receives his own powers. In season 3, he has aged into an elderly man and has learned to speak, but still struggles to control his unwanted powers.
- Dov Tiefenbach as Keechie (season 2), a devoted member of Klaus' 1960s cult.
- Robin Atkin Downes as A.J. Carmichael (season 2), a talking goldfish who is the leader of the Commission board.
- Mouna Traoré as Jill (season 2), a member of Klaus' 1960s cult with whom Ben falls in love.
- Justin Cornwell as Marcus Hargreeves / Sparrow Number One (season 3), a member and leader of the Sparrow Academy with superhuman strength.
- Jake Epstein as Alphonso Hargreeves / Sparrow Number Four (season 3), a physically scarred and injured member of the Sparrow Academy with the ability to reflect any physical harm back to his opponents.
- Cazzie David as Jayme Hargreeves / Sparrow Number Six (season 3), a member of the Sparrow Academy with the ability to spit hallucinogenic venom.
- Javon "Wanna" Walton as Stanley "Stan" (season 3), a twelve-year-old boy posing as Diego and Lila's son at Lila's request.
- Julian Richings as Chet Rodo (season 3), the eccentric manager of the Hotel Obsidian.
- David Cross as Sy Grossman (season 4), a man who Abigail Hargreeves, Reginald's wife, killed and assumed the identity of.
- Nick Offerman as Dr. Gene Thibedeau (season 4), Jean's husband and the co-creator of the Keepers.
- Megan Mullally as Dr. Jean Thibedeau (season 4), Gene's wife and the co-creator of the Keepers.
- Martin Roach as Lance Ribbons (season 4), a deputy director of the CIA.
- Liisa Repo-Martell as Abigail Hargreeves (season 4; guest seasons 1 and 3), Sir Reginald's wife, who dies on their home planet. She is brought back to life in the third season.
- Victoria Sawal as Jennifer (season 4), a girl infected with durango who Ben forms a romantic attachment to.
- Millie Davis (season 4) and Coco Assad (guest seasons 1 and 3) as Claire, Allison's daughter.

== Episodes ==
Season	Episodes	Originally released
1	10	February 15, 2019
2	10	July 31, 2020
3	10	June 22, 2022
4	6	August 8, 2024

=== Season 1 (2019) ===
No. overall	No. in season	Title	Directed by	Teleplay by	Original release date
1	1	"We Only See Each Other at Weddings and Funerals"	Peter Hoar	Jeremy Slater	February 15, 2019
2	2	"Run Boy Run"	Andrew Bernstein	Steve Blackman	February 15, 2019
3	3	"Extra Ordinary"	Andrew Bernstein	Ben Nedivi & Matt Wolpert	February 15, 2019
4	4	"Man on the Moon"	Ellen Kuras	Lauren Schmidt Hissrich	February 15, 2019
5	5	"Number Five"	Ellen Kuras	Bob DeLaurentis	February 15, 2019
6	6	"The Day That Wasn't"	Stephen Surjik	Sneha Koorse	February 15, 2019
7	7	"The Day That Was"	Stephen Surjik	Ben Nedivi & Matt Wolpert	February 15, 2019
8	8	"I Heard a Rumor"	Jeremy Webb	Lauren Schmidt Hissrich & Sneha Koorse	February 15, 2019
9	9	"Changes"	Jeremy Webb	Bob DeLaurentis & Eric W. Phillips	February 15, 2019
10	10	"The White Violin"	Peter Hoar	Steve Blackman	February 15, 2019

=== Season 2 (2020) ===
No. overall	No. in season	Title	Directed by	Teleplay by	Original release date
11	1	"Right Back Where We Started"	Sylvain White	Steve Blackman	July 31, 2020
12	2	"The Frankel Footage"	Stephen Surjik	Mark Goffman	July 31, 2020
13	3	"The Swedish Job"	Stephen Surjik	Jesse McKeown	July 31, 2020
14	4	"The Majestic 12"	Tom Verica	Bronwyn Garrity	July 31, 2020
15	5	"Valhalla"	Tom Verica	Robert Askins	July 31, 2020
16	6	"A Light Supper"	Ellen Kuras	Aeryn Michelle Williams	July 31, 2020
17	7	"Öga for Öga"	Ellen Kuras	Nikki Schiefelbein	July 31, 2020
18	8	"The Seven Stages"	Amanda Marsalis	Mark Goffman & Jesse McKeown	July 31, 2020
19	9	"743"	Amanda Marsalis	Bronwyn Garrity & Robert Askins	July 31, 2020
20	10	"The End of Something"	Jeremy Webb	Steve Blackman	July 31, 2020

=== Season 3 (2022) ===
No. overall	No. in season	Title	Directed by	Teleplay by	Original release date
21	1	"Meet the Family"	Jeremy Webb	Steve Blackman & Michelle Lovretta	June 22, 2022
22	2	"World's Biggest Ball of Twine"	Cheryl Dunye	Jesse McKeown	June 22, 2022
23	3	"Pocket Full of Lightning"	Cheryl Dunye	Robert Askins	June 22, 2022
24	4	"Kugelblitz"	Sylvain White	Aeryn Michelle Williams	June 22, 2022
25	5	"Kindest Cut"	Sylvain White	Elizabeth Padden	June 22, 2022
26	6	"Marigold"	Jeff F. King	Lauren Otero	June 22, 2022
27	7	"Auf Wiedersehen"	Kate Woods	Michelle Lovretta	June 22, 2022
28	8	"Wedding at the End of the World"	Paco Cabezas	Jesse McKeown & Aeryn Michelle Williams	June 22, 2022
29	9	"Seven Bells"	Paco Cabezas	Robert Askins	June 22, 2022
30	10	"Oblivion"	Jeff F. King	Steve Blackman & Robert Askins	June 22, 2022

=== Season 4 (2024) ===
No. overall	No. in season	Title	Directed by	Written by	Original release date
31	1	"The Unbearable Tragedy of Getting What You Want"	Jeremy Webb	Steve Blackman & Jesse McKeown	August 8, 2024
32	2	"Jean and Gene"	Jeremy Webb	Teleplay by : Molly Nussbaum & Robert Askins; Story by : Molly Nussbaum & Robert Askins and Jesse McKeown	August 8, 2024
33	3	"The Squid and The Girl"	Paco Cabezas	Aeryn Michelle Williams and Elizabeth Padden	August 8, 2024
34	4	"The Cleanse"	Paco Cabezas	Lauren Otero and Thomas Page McBee	August 8, 2024
35	5	"Six Years, Five Months, and Two Days"	Neville Kidd	Teleplay by : Jesse McKeown and Andrew Raab; Story by : Robert Askins & Christopher High and Jesse McKeown & Andrew Raab	August 8, 2024
36	6	"End of the Beginning"	Paco Cabezas	Teleplay by : Jesse McKeown and Robert Askins & Christopher High and Steve Blackman; Story by : Jesse McKeown	August 8, 2024

== Production ==
=== Development ===
A film version of the comic book series The Umbrella Academy was optioned by Universal Studios. Originally, screenwriter Mark Bomback was hired to write the screenplay; Rawson Marshall Thurber reportedly replaced him in 2010. There had been little talk of the film from that time. In an interview with Newsarama at the 2012 New York Comic Con, Gerard Way mentioned that there have been "good talks" and a "really good script", but that it was "kind of up to the universe".

==== Season 1 ====
On July 7, 2015, it was announced that The Umbrella Academy would be developed into a television series produced by Universal Cable Productions, rather than an original film. On July 11, 2017, it was officially announced that Netflix had greenlit a live-action series adaptation of The Umbrella Academy with Way and Gabriel Bá acting as executive producers, to premiere in 2019. The series was created by Steve Blackman, who served as showrunner. The pilot episode was written by series developer Jeremy Slater.

==== Season 2 ====
On April 2, 2019, the series was renewed for a ten-episode second season. It was also confirmed that the second season would consist of ten episodes, like the first season. The season release date remained unknown until May 18, 2020, when a teaser trailer concept was released where the main cast danced to "I Think We're Alone Now" by Tiffany. Steve Blackman confirmed to The Hollywood Reporter that he wanted to stay close to the content of the comics. On June 26, 2020, it was revealed that the series would be taking place in the 1960s in Dallas, due to the time travel from the end of the previous season.

==== Season 3 ====
On November 10, 2020, Netflix renewed the series for a ten-episode third season. While the series initially had a "TV-14" rating for its first two seasons, the maturity rating was increased to "TV-MA" for its third season, mainly due to an increase in profanity.

==== Season 4 ====
In June 2022, Blackman revealed that, should the series get renewed for a fourth season, it would most likely serve as the end to the series, although he did not rule out the possibility of Netflix pursuing further installments. In August 2022, Netflix renewed the series for a fourth and final season, with Jesse McKeown serving as co-showrunner with Blackman. The season consists of six episodes, the fewest of any season.

=== Writing ===
In June 2022, it was revealed, according to series creator Steve Blackman, that the Season 3 scripts were complete when Elliot Page called him to share the news of his transition, with Blackman feeling it was "very important" that he and Page collaborate on incorporating Viktor's transition into the existing scripts. This led to Thomas Page McBee, an author and television writer who previously worked with Page on 2019's Tales of the City, being brought onboard as a writer/producer to ensure that the storyline where Viktor comes out as trans was handled with care and respect.

=== Casting ===
On November 9, 2017, Netflix confirmed that Elliot Page had joined the cast and that he would play Vanya Hargreeves (now Viktor Hargreeves), also known as the White Violin. On November 30, 2017, it was revealed that Tom Hopper, David Castañeda, Emmy Raver-Lampman, Robert Sheehan and Aidan Gallagher had joined the cast as the rest of the Hargreeves siblings. On February 12, 2018, Netflix announced that Academy Award nominee Mary J. Blige would appear in the series as the sadistic time-travel assassin Cha-Cha. Colm Feore joined the cast as Sir Reginald Hargreeves, the adoptive father of the siblings, on February 16, 2018, alongside Cameron Britton, Adam Godley and Ashley Madekwe. On February 28, 2018, it was announced that John Magaro has been cast as a series regular character.

In January 2020, Justin H. Min and Kate Walsh were promoted to series regulars for the second season, following their recurring roles in the first season. On September 10, 2019, Netflix announced that three additional actors — Ritu Arya, Marin Ireland and Yusuf Gatewood — would join the cast. On October 17, 2019, John Kapelos announced that he would be joining the recurring cast as Jack Ruby, the man who killed Lee Harvey Oswald.

On January 11, 2021, it was announced that Justin Cornwell, Britne Oldford, Genesis Rodriguez, Cazzie David, and Jake Epstein joined the cast as part of the Sparrow Academy for the third season. In January 2022, Javon Walton revealed in an interview he joined the cast in an undisclosed role for the third season.

In February 2023, Megan Mullally, Nick Offerman, and David Cross joined the cast for the fourth season in undisclosed roles.

=== Filming ===
Principal photography for the first season began on January 15, 2018, in Toronto. Gerard Way's Instagram account shared an illustration by Fabio Moon of the cast and crew doing the first table read of the script in Toronto. Way also revealed a picture of the first day on the set. Additional filming took place in Hamilton, Ontario. The theatre scene of Vanya performing was filmed at the Elgin Theatre and the Winter Garden Theatre. Mazzoleni Concert Hall was used to represent the theatre's exterior. The exterior of the mansion was filmed at a building in Hamilton, while the interiors were filmed in studio. The Joey & Toby Tanenbaum Opera Centre was filmed for an outside scene and LIUNA Station was used for a bank robbery scene. A laboratory at the University of Toronto was filmed to represent the Meritech Prosthetics building. The filming concluded on July 18, 2018.

Filming for the second season began on June 16, 2019. Like the previous season, it was filmed in Toronto and Hamilton, Ontario, despite the series taking place in Dallas, Texas. Exterior shots, including scenes in Dealey Plaza, were taken in Dallas. Filming concluded on November 23, 2019.

Filming for the third season began on February 7, 2021, and concluded on August 28, 2021.

Filming for the fourth season began on February 6, 2023, and concluded on May 31, 2023. Filming for the season was finished before the 2023 Writers Guild of America strike occurred.

=== Visual effects ===
Visual effects for the series are handled by SpinVFX, Weta Digital, Folks VFX, Soho VFX, Pixomondo, Deluxe VFX, Digital Film Tree, BOT VFX, Studio 8, Exceptional Minds and MARZ.

VFX supervisor Everet Burrell used traditional art techniques for early concept art and referenced great actors with iconic faces. Burrell called Weta Digital, who previously worked for the rebooted Planet of the Apes series, to develop the visual effects for the character of Pogo. Ken Hall provided the motion capture for Pogo using a gray suit to later make additions to his captures to create the CGI of the chimpanzee, with Adam Godley making the facial expressions and voice acting of the character.

SpinVFX confirmed that they delivered at least 563 shots for the series. To make the effects of the show, the team required a series of complex effect simulations, creature development, and massive destructions.

For the effects of Number Five jumping through time and space, Burrell wanted to make the effects look organic, and liquidy, representing how much time and the world bends around him when he jumps, and how quick it should be. For these effects, he used more than 30 frames in the first episodes, however with the progress of the series, this reduced to only 10 frames. To that footage, the team iterated on several kinds of spatial jump effects, all the way from heavy distortion to subtler images. The visual effects team started with some R&D tests. At the end, the final effect, called the "jelly vision", was used to make the series, with Burrell expressing: "as if you're pushing your hand through a jelly membrane, just for a few seconds, and then it pops. It's really, really subtle, but you get a little bit of texture, you get a little bit of striations, almost like the universe is bending as he does his spatial jumps."

In an interview with Burrell he confirmed that to develop the sequences where time is frozen, they took several background shots on location before returning to their stage to shoot the dialogue between Five and The Handler in front of a green screen. They called this effect "Three-Strip" in honor of the Technicolor process used in the 1930s.

The second season used 400 shots from the Folks VFX Montreal team under the guidance of VFX supervisor Laurent Spillemaecker to create time portal effects seen throughout the season, particularly Five's special ability. Meanwhile, Spillemaecker's crew recreated events surrounding JFK's fateful Dallas visit, while including The Umbrella Academy's superpower interactions. Pictures and references from the 1960s were provided to create and later to be used as digital matte paintings and CG environments, to transform Canada into the show's setting, 1960s Dallas.

The opening scene of the second season, where the siblings fight the Soviets on a Dallas street, was the most complicated to do, being nearly completely CGI. It was realized on a 360 degree bluescreen backlot set which was 15 feet tall and 200 feet by 60 feet. The only real things that were not made of CGI, were the tank, soldiers, cast and the rubble on the ground. The set was LiDAR scanned so that the director, Sylvian White could walk around using a VR edition of the iPad. They used a Phantom running at 700 frames per second on a camera stick. The scene was also divided in seven parts, beginning with Number Five's arrival at 1963, and concluding before Diego's first lines. For safety reasons the crew could not fire the AK-47s at Diego so they were forced to do multiple passes.

=== Music ===
The show's score albums were released for seasons 1 and 2. Jeff Russo was hired to compose the show's score. During an interview he revealed that he "needed to use a subtle hand with the score" and that they "wanted the score to be thematic, by not trying to push too much on the weird and too much on the horrific aspect of the show and the story".

== Reception ==
=== Audience viewership ===
On April 16, 2019, Netflix announced that the series had been streamed by over 45 million viewers on its service within its first month of release, with people at least having watched 70% percent of one episode of the series. It was the third most popular TV series on Netflix in 2019. On September 3, 2020, Netflix revealed the show broke numerous records in viewerships, following the second season debut. During the second season first week, the show was the most watched television series show on Netflix, being atop of the Nielsen ratings and thus confirming that 3 billion minutes of the show's two seasons were viewed. On October 21, 2020, Netflix published the Nielsen ratings and revealed that the show's second season was streamed by over 43 million viewers in its first 28 days. It made it the 6th most watched show of that year, falling behind shows like The Queen's Gambit and Ratched.

=== Critical response ===
Critical response of The Umbrella Academy
Season	Rotten Tomatoes	Metacritic
1	77% (94 reviews)	61 (22 reviews)
2	91% (89 reviews)	67 (12 reviews)
3	91% (58 reviews)	74 (10 reviews)
4	55% (38 reviews)	59 (11 reviews)

On the review aggregator Rotten Tomatoes, 77% of 94 critic reviews are positive for the first season, with an average rating of 7.2/10. Critics' consensus on the website reads, "The Umbrella Academy unfurls an imaginative yarn with furtive emotion and an exceptionally compelling ensemble, but the series' dour sensibility often clashes with its splashy genre trappings." Metacritic, which uses a weighted average, assigned the season a score of 61 out of 100 based on 22 critics, indicating "generally favorable reviews".

For the second season, Rotten Tomatoes identified 91% of 89 reviews as positive, with an average rating of 7.9/10. The website's critics consensus states, "Proof that time can heal almost all wounds, The Umbrella Academy's exhilarating second season lightens its tonal load without losing its emotional core, giving the super siblings room to grow while doubling down on the time traveling fun." The season garnered a weighted average score of 67 out of 100 from 12 critics on Metacritic, signifying "generally favorable reviews".

For the third season, Rotten Tomatoes reported a 91% approval rating with an average rating of 7.6/10, based on 57 reviews. The website's critics consensus reads, "The Umbrella Academy unfurls a bit beyond a manageable scope in this overstuffed season, but there remains all the gonzo creativity and resonant character relationships that fans enroll for." Metacritic, which uses a weighted average, assigned a score of 74 out of 100 based on 10 critics, indicating "generally favorable reviews".

The fourth season holds an approval rating of 55% on Rotten Tomatoes, based on 38 reviews, with an average rating of 5.7/10. The website's critics consensus states, "Getting the band back together for one last haphazard race to the finish, The Umbrella Academy's fourth season rains on the series' parade a bit while still offering some sweet grace notes. On Metacritic, the fourth season received a score of 59 based on reviews from 11 critics, signifying "mixed or average reviews".

=== Accolades ===
Accolades received by The Umbrella Academy
Year	Award	Category	Recipient(s)	Result	Ref.
2019	Teen Choice Awards	Choice Sci-Fi/Fantasy TV Actress	Elliot Page	Nominated	
2019	Saturn Awards	Best Streaming Superhero Television Series	The Umbrella Academy	Nominated	
2019	Saturn Awards	Best Supporting Actress in a Streaming Presentation	Elliot Page	Nominated	
2019	Primetime Emmy Awards	Outstanding Production Design for a Narrative Contemporary Program (One Hour or More)	Mark Worthington, Mark Steel & Jim Lambie (for "We Only See Each Other at Weddings and Funerals")	Nominated	
2019	Primetime Emmy Awards	Outstanding Special Visual Effects	Everett Burrell, Chris White, Jeff Campbell, Sebastien Bergeron, Sean Schur, Steve Dellerson, Libby Hazell, Carrie Richardson & Misato Shinohara (for "The White Violin")	Nominated	
2019	People's Choice Awards	The Bingeworthy Show of 2019	The Umbrella Academy	Nominated	
2019	People's Choice Awards	The Sci-Fi/Fantasy Show of 2019	The Umbrella Academy	Nominated	
2019	MTV Movie & TV Awards	Best Musical Moment	"I Think We're Alone Now" scene	Nominated	
2020	Visual Effects Society Awards	Outstanding Animated Character in an Episode or Real-Time Project	Aidan Martin, Craig Young, Olivier Beierlein & Laurent Herveic (for Pilot; Pogo)	Nominated	
2020	Casting Society of America	Television Pilot & First Season – Drama	Junie Lowry Johnson, Libby Goldstein, April Webster, Robin D. Cook, Samantha Garrabrant, Josh Ropiequet & Jonathan Oliveira	Nominated	
2020	Art Directors Guild Awards	One-Hour Contemporary Single-Camera Series	Mark Worthington (for "We Only See Each Other at Weddings and Funerals")	Won	
2020	People's Choice Awards	The Sci-Fi/Fantasy Show of 2020	The Umbrella Academy	Nominated	
2021	Critics' Choice Super Awards	Best Superhero Series	The Umbrella Academy	Nominated	
2021	Hollywood Music in Media Awards	Best Music Supervision – Television	Jen Malone	Nominated	
2021	GLAAD Media Awards	Outstanding Drama Series	The Umbrella Academy	Nominated	
2021	Annie Awards	Best Character Animation - Live Action	Aidan Martin, Hunter Parks, Craig Young, Viki Yeo & Krystal Sae Eua	Nominated	
2021	Motion Picture Sound Editors Awards	Outstanding Achievement in Sound Editing – Episodic Short Form – Dialogue/ADR	John Benson & Jason Krane (for "The End of Something")	Nominated	
2021	Motion Picture Sound Editors Awards	Outstanding Achievement in Sound Editing - Episodic Short Form – Music	Jen Malone & Lodge Worster (for "Valhalla")	Nominated	
2021	MTV Movie & TV Awards	Best Performance in a Show	Elliot Page	Nominated	
2021	Saturn Awards	Best Superhero Adaptation Television Series	The Umbrella Academy	Nominated	
2021	Primetime Emmy Awards	Outstanding Cinematography for a Single-Camera Series (One Hour)	Neville Kidd (for "Right Back Where We Started")	Nominated	
2021	Primetime Emmy Awards	Outstanding Fantasy/Sci-Fi Costumes	Christopher Hargadon, Heather Crepp, William Ng & Jane Fieber (for "The Frankel Footage")	Nominated	
2021	Primetime Emmy Awards	Outstanding Sound Editing for a Comedy or Drama Series (One-Hour)	John Benson, Jason Krane, John Snider, AJ Shapiro, Dario Biscaldi, Lodge Worster, Lindsay Pepper & Zane D. Bruce (for "The End of Something")	Nominated	
2021	Primetime Emmy Awards	Outstanding Special Visual Effects in a Single Episode	Everett Burrell, Phillip Hoffman, Jesse Kawzenuk, Christopher Stack, Sophie Vertigan, Jeff Campbell, Laurent Spillemaecker, R. Christopher White & Ryan Freer (for "743")	Nominated	
2022	Saturn Awards	Best Streaming Action-Adventure Television Series	The Umbrella Academy	Nominated	
2022	Saturn Awards	Best Supporting Actor in a Streaming Television Series	Elliot Page	Won	
2022	People's Choice Awards	The Sci-Fi/Fantasy Show of 2022	The Umbrella Academy	Nominated	
2023	Visual Effects Society Awards	Outstanding Animated Character in an Episode or Real-Time Project	Aidan Martin, Hannah Dockerty, Olivier Beierlein, Miae Kang	Won	
2023	Critics' Choice Super Awards	Best Actor in a Superhero Series, Limited Series or Made-for-TV Movie	Elliot Page	Nominated	

== See also ==
- Civil rights movement in popular culture
- Time Variance Authority, a Commission-like organization in Marvel comics
