= Untitled Home Invasion Romance =

American action comedy film

- Theatrical release poster
- Directed by: Jason Biggs
- Written by: Jamie Napoli; Joshua Paul Johnson
- Produced by: Brad Krevoy; Charles Cohen; Jimmy Philémond-Montout; David Anselmo
- Starring: Jason Biggs; Justin H. Min; Meaghan Rath; Arturo Castro; Anna Konkle
- Cinematography: Zach Kuperstein
- Edited by: Mollie Goldstein
- Music by: Ryan Miller; Jay Lifton
- Production company: Motion Picture Corporation of America
- Distributed by: Republic Pictures
- Release dates: September 18, 2025 (Cinéfest); January 27, 2026 (United States)
- Running time: 85 minutes
- Countries: United States; Canada
- Language: English

Untitled Home Invasion Romance is a 2025 black comedy thriller film directed by and starring Jason Biggs in his directorial debut, alongside Justin H. Min, Meaghan Rath, Arturo Castro, and Anna Konkle.

== Plot ==
Kevin and his wife, Suzie, have been separated for two months. In an attempt to reconcile, Kevin arranges a romantic weekend getaway. To Suzie's dismay, she learns during the journey that he is taking her to her father's lake house in the town of Wapanoga, which she has avoided for more than 20 years because of traumatic memories. Unbeknownst to her, Kevin has enlisted his friend Ernie to stage a home invasion so that Kevin can heroically intervene and impress her.

Kevin's plan unravels when Suzie insists on going out drinking instead of staying at the house, and he is unable to contact Ernie due to the area's poor phone reception. At a local bar, Suzie reunites with her former best friend Heather, now the town's police chief, while Kevin realizes Ernie is also in the bar and confronts him about remaining unseen. Suzie confides in Heather that she is unhappy and feels that something is wrong with her, although she cannot identify what. Heather later drives Suzie home while Kevin returns separately. Distracted by reviewing the script for the staged invasion, Kevin crashes his car and is delayed returning home. Meanwhile, the unaware Ernie attacks a terrified Suzie, and she kills him in self-defense. On his return, Kevin hides Ernie's belongings to conceal his identity. As Kevin was seen with Ernie, Heather grows suspicious of Kevin. Suzie's former fiancé, Stu, arrives to act as her defense attorney, upsetting Kevin, who believes Stu still harbors feelings for her.

Later, Heather overhears an elderly couple discussing an incident involving Suzie during her teenage years. She confronts her father, the town's former police chief, who reveals that Suzie killed Gregory Doyle—a violent bully who tormented her and Heather—in self-defense at the lake house. He suggests that she deliberately provoked Gregory into attacking her and found her smiling in the aftermath. Following the incident, Suzie was sent away to the city. Heather's father also admits that Suzie frequently wrote letters to Heather afterward, but he destroyed them. Ernie's car is eventually discovered, revealing his identity. His brothers, Victor and Oscar, arrive to identify the body and learn that Ernie was seen with Kevin.

As Kevin and Suzie prepare to leave Wapanoga, Stu discovers Ernie's hidden belongings, confirming Kevin's involvement. Distraught by Kevin's deception, Suzie leaves with Stu, but the pair are abducted by Victor and Oscar, who mistakenly believe Stu is Kevin. They take Suzie and Stu onto a boat and attempt to force Suzie to confess to intentionally murdering Ernie. Stu lunges at Oscar, causing Oscar's gun to discharge accidentally and kill Stu. Suzie jumps from the boat and returns to the lake house. Meanwhile, Kevin telephones Heather and confesses his involvement, prompting her to head to the house.

Back at the house, Suzie passionately kisses Kevin and admits that she deliberately killed Gregory. She explains that therapy afterward conditioned her to see herself as a victim, but that defeating Gregory made her feel alive, a sensation she had been missing until the staged invasion and the threat of Victor and Oscar. Heather arrives and holds Victor at gunpoint, but Oscar fatally impales her with an axe while Suzie fails to warn her. Suzie then kills Victor and Oscar. As Heather dies, Suzie tearfully admits that she never stopped thinking about her and was hurt that Heather never replied to her letters or thanked her for killing Gregory.

When police arrive, they are told that Heather died heroically after killing Victor and Oscar, the masterminds behind the home invasion. Suzie tells Kevin that she is fortunate to have him because he accepts her true nature. As the couple drives away from Wapanoga, they clasp hands and smile.

== Cast ==
- Jason Biggs as Kevin Stanwell
- Meaghan Rath as Suzie Stone
  - Tianna Swaminathan as Young Suzie
- Anna Konkle as Heather
- Justin H. Min as Stu Cho
- Arturo Castro as Ernie Guerra
- Chris Young as Victor Guerra
- René Escobar Jr. as Oscar Guerra
- Steven Vlahos as Murphy

== Production ==
The screenplay, originally titled Getaway, won Script Pipeline's 2017 Screenwriting Contest. Jamie Napoli and Joshua Paul Johnson wrote the script for the film which is produced by the Motion Picture Corporation of America. Brad Krevoy, Charles Cohen, Jimmy Philémond-Montout and David Anselmo are producers. The film is directed by Jason Biggs who also leads the cast. The cast includes Justin H. Min, Meaghan Rath, Arturo Castro and Anna Konkle.

Principal photography began in August 2024 in Sudbury, Ontario.

== Release ==
Republic Pictures acquired global rights in October 2024.

The film was announced in the program of the 2025 Cinéfest Sudbury International Film Festival, under the title Untitled Home Invasion Romance. The film's title was subsequently confirmed in a short Instagram interview of Biggs by Dutch television personality Mario-Max Schaumburg-Lippe in August 2025.

The film screened at the Torino Film Festival in November 2025. It was released in the United States on January 27, 2026.

=== Critical reception ===
On the review aggregator website Rotten Tomatoes, 79% of 14 critics' reviews are positive, with an average rating of 6.3/10.
