= Wētā FX =

New Zealand-based media company

- Formerly: Weta Digital (1993–2021)
- Type: Private
- Industry: Visual effects; Computer graphics; Feature animation; Television animation
- Founded: 1993; 33 years ago
- Founders: Peter Jackson; Richard Taylor; Jamie Selkirk
- Headquarters: Miramar, Wellington, New Zealand
- Key people: Matt Aitken (Head of VFX); Kevin Sherwood (Head of Production)
- Owner: Peter Jackson
- Number of employees: 2,000 (2025)
- Subsidiaries: Wētā FX Melbourne; Wētā FX Vancouver
- Website: www.wetafx.co.nz

Wētā FX, formerly known as Weta Digital, is a New Zealand digital visual effects and computer animation company based in Miramar, Wellington. It was founded by Peter Jackson, Richard Taylor, and Jamie Selkirk in 1993 to produce the digital visual effects for Heavenly Creatures. The company went on to create the visual effects for some of the highest-grossing films ever made, such as the Lord of the Rings trilogy and the Avatar series. Considered one of the most influential film companies of the 21st century, Wētā FX has won several Academy Awards and BAFTA Awards. The company is named after the New Zealand wētā, one of the world's largest insects, which appeared in the original version of the company logo.

== History ==
=== 2000s ===
The studio has developed several proprietary software packages to achieve groundbreaking visual effects. The scale of the battles required for The Lord of the Rings film trilogy led to the creation of MASSIVE, a program which can animate huge numbers of agents—independent characters acting according to pre-set rules.

To recreate 1933 New York for King Kong, the company created CityBot, an application which could "build" the city on a shot by shot basis. Kong's fur also required the development of new simulation and modeling software. A set of tools that combined procedural and interactive techniques added wind to the five million individual strands of fur and modeled interaction with other surfaces. New shaders were written that accounted for the scattering of light from within each hair that added to the volumetric quality of the fur. Large chunks of fur were ripped out and filled in with scars, blood, and the mud of Skull Island. Each frame of fur took two gigabytes of data.

For James Cameron's Avatar, Weta Digital modified MASSIVE to give life to the flora and fauna on Pandora, for which the company did most of the visual effects with Joe Letteri, under a team led by executive and producer Eileen Moran. The film is regarded as a landmark for visual effects. (Note: Attributed to multiple references:) By 2017, Weta Digital had started visual effects development for the sequels. (Note: Attributed to multiple references:)

=== 2010s ===
In 2010, a texture painting application developed by the studio for Avatar called Mari has been bought by The Foundry Visionmongers. For The Adventures of Tintin and Rise of the Planet of the Apes, the studio developed a new grooming system called Barbershop where users can interactively manipulate digital hair. This tool received a Sci-tech award in 2015. The Adventures of Tintin was Weta Digital's first fully animated feature film.

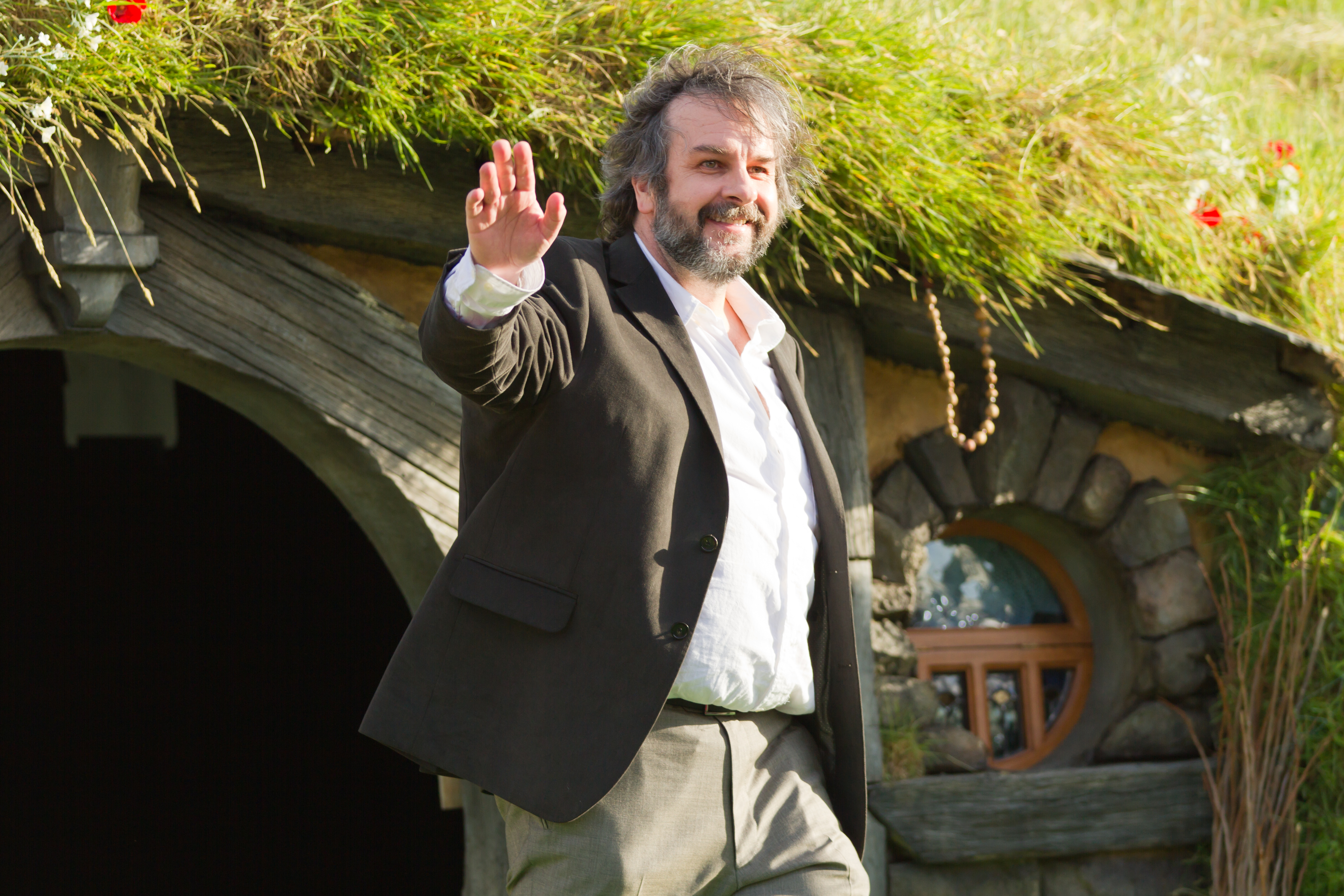
Peter Jackson, co-founder and owner of Wētā FX

For Rise of the Planet of the Apes (2011), Weta developed a motion capture technique that could be utilized while shooting on location. (Note: Attributed to multiple references:) The technology was improved for the sequel Dawn of the Planet of the Apes (2014), (Note: Attributed to multiple references:) and was further refined for War for the Planet of the Apes (2017). (Note: Attributed to multiple references:)

=== 2020s ===
On June 19, 2020, Weta Digital announced that it would be producing original animation content under the name Weta Animated. (Note: Attributed to multiple references:) The company also announced a new chief executive, Prem Akkaraju. (Note: Attributed to multiple references:) In September 2020, Weta was able to secure a multi-year deal with Amazon Web Services to use the Amazon cloud to forward its VFX and computer animation production.

In December 2020, Weta Digital CEO Akkaraju announced additional board members including Tom Staggs, Jeff Huber and Ken Kamins. They join current board members Peter Jackson, Fran Walsh, Sean Parker and Joe Letteri.

On June 17, 2021, Weta Digital announced they have partnered with Autodesk to productize Weta's proprietary tools based in Autodesk Maya for a cloud service called WetaM. It will first be released in Q4 as a private beta. On August 23, 2021, Weta Digital announced a collaboration with SideFX for a cloud service combining the studio's proprietary tools within SideFX's Houdini called WetaH.

Logo history

2009–2022

2013–2022

On November 9, 2021, Jackson sold the company's VFX tools development division to video games software company Unity Technologies for US$1.625 billion. (Note: Attributed to multiple references:) Unity's acquired tech assets of Weta would be called Weta Digital, while the visual effects company remained separate and was renamed Wētā FX. The acquisition was completed in December 2021. In April 2022, Wētā FX opened a new studio in Vancouver, Canada. It is the company's first dedicated VFX and animation studio outside New Zealand. In July 2022, Wētā FX opened a second studio outside New Zealand, a temporary facility in Melbourne, Australia.

For Avatar: The Way of Water in 2022, Wētā worked on 3,240 visual effects shots, 2,225 of which involved water. The studio developed new motion capture technology for the film's underwater sequences. (Note: Attributed to multiple references:) The digital water in the film was created by artists using Wētā's latest Loki simulation software. Wētā also refined their Facial Action Coding System (FACS) from Alita: Battle Angel for its use in Avatar: The Way of Water. (Note: Attributed to multiple references:) The company eventually ended up rendering close to 3.3 billion thread hours. Letteri won his fifth Academy Award for his work on the film. The studio also won their seventh Academy Award for Best Visual Effects.

On November 25, 2023, Unity and Wētā FX mutually agreed to terminate Unity’s service agreement with Wētā FX effective December 10, 2023; this comes after Unity laying off the entire Wētā Digital staff in a "company reset". Unity will continue to own the software from the Wētā Digital acquisition (with Wētā FX being able to continue using them), but the Wētā Digital name and related intellectual property will be transferred back to Wētā FX with no current plans to use the old Wētā Digital name. Wētā FX will be extending offers to as many of the Digital team as possible "as it looks to expand its research, development and support functions".

For Kingdom of the Planet of the Apes in 2024, Wētā used new techniques to create even more realistic apes, including the use of dual-camera facial rigs to capture performance with greater fidelity than the previous films in the franchise, as well as evolving software for tasks such as muscle simulation, facial animation and grooming. (Note: Attributed to multiple references:) Wētā also utilized machine learning, as well as new third-generation performance-capture suits for filming. In total, more than 1,000 artists were involved and the film contains over 1,500 visual effects shots. (Note: Attributed to multiple references:) Water simulation technology and techniques from Avatar: The Way of Water were carried over. The team also created high-resolution digital environments as well as hair and cape simulations tuned to interact correctly with the simulated wind and airflow for James Gunn's Superman in 2025. (Note: Attributed to multiple references:) For Avatar: Fire and Ash, Wētā collaborated with Industrial Light & Magic for the performance capture process. Wētā delivered 3,132 shots — 94% of the 195-minute film — requiring 1,248,087,308 render hours, or roughly 142,000 years of computation on a single processor. At peak production, the studio generated approximately 200–250TB of data per day, ultimately occupying 140PB of disk space. For their work on the film, the studio won their eighth Academy Award for Best Visual Effects. Wētā FX was responsible for 94% of the film's visual effects shots and over 1,200 artists worked on Avatar: Fire and Ash.

In April 2025, Wētā FX expanded its presence in Melbourne. After originally operating from a temporary facility during the production of Better Man, the company established a permanent Australian headquarters. On June 11, 2025, Lee Berger was appointed as business development senior producer. In early August 2025, Wētā proposed laying off 100 jobs in its support departments based in Wellington. In November 2025, Wētā and Amazon Web Services announced an agreement to explore the development of AI tools specifically designed for visual effects artists. On December 9, 2025, Wētā signed a memorandum of understanding with AMD to explore the development of next-generation rendering and AI tools aiming to optimize VFX workflows.

== Workplace culture ==
An investigation into Wētā's workplace culture by Kiwi public TV broadcaster 1News, begun in June 2020 following a social media post by former Wētā Workshop employee Layna Lazar, resulted in more than 40 current and former Weta Digital employees anonymously sharing accounts of "sexism, bullying and harassment" in September 2020. (Note: Attributed to multiple references:)

In their testimonies, workers identified the existence of a male-only pornographic mailing list called "Caveman", which originated in 2002 following a company-wide tradition known as Porn Friday, and continued to circulate until 2015. Several reports also alleged that the company's IT systems required upgrades in order to accommodate the volume of pornographic content hosted on the company intranet, in addition to numerous allegations of sexual harassment, bullying, intimidation, misogyny and homophobia.

In response to these allegations, Wētā owners, including Peter Jackson, Fran Walsh, and chief executive officer Prem Akkaraju, commissioned an independent review from barrister Miriam Dean, who stated in her report that she received 80 complaints of bullying behavior, 120 complaints of inappropriate conduct and 19 complaints of sexual harassment from amongst the company's 1,500 employees. (Note: Attributed to multiple references:)

Dean put forward 17 recommendations for internal reform, including the establishment of a code of conduct, restricting the executive team, expanding the diversity and inclusion program, and reviewing the company's pay structure. Her review also stated that the existing management systems were not sufficient to protect workers "from bullying, sexual harassment, sex discrimination and other inappropriate conduct". (Note: Attributed to multiple references:)

== Awards ==
As of 2026, Wētā FX has won the Academy Award for Best Visual Effects for its work on eight films:

- The Lord of the Rings: The Fellowship of the Ring (2001)
- The Lord of the Rings: The Two Towers (2002)
- The Lord of the Rings: The Return of the King (2003)
- King Kong (2005)
- Avatar (2009)
- The Jungle Book (2016)
- Avatar: The Way of Water (2022)
- Avatar: Fire and Ash (2025)

== Films ==
=== 1990s ===
Year	Films	Studio(s) and Distributor(s)
1994	Heavenly Creatures	Miramax Films
1995	Forgotten Silver	WingNut Films
1996	The Frighteners	Universal Pictures
1997	Contact	Warner Bros.

=== 2000s ===
Year	Films	Studio(s) and Distributor(s)
2001	The Lord of the Rings: The Fellowship of the Ring	New Line Cinema
2002	The Lord of the Rings: The Two Towers	New Line Cinema
2003	The Lord of the Rings: The Return of the King	New Line Cinema
2004	Van Helsing	Universal Studios
2004	I, Robot	20th Century Fox
2005	King Kong	Universal Studios
2006	X-Men: The Last Stand	20th Century Fox
2006	Eragon	20th Century Fox
2007	Bridge to Terabithia	Walt Disney Pictures
2007	Fantastic Four: Rise of the Silver Surfer	20th Century Fox
2007	Enchanted	Walt Disney Pictures
2007	The Water Horse: Legend of the Deep	Sony Pictures Releasing / Columbia Pictures
2007	30 Days of Night	Sony Pictures Releasing / Columbia Pictures
2008	Jumper	20th Century Fox
2008	The Chronicles of Narnia: Prince Caspian	Walt Disney Studios
2008	The Day the Earth Stood Still	20th Century Fox
2009	District 9	Sony Pictures Releasing / TriStar Pictures
2009	The Lovely Bones	Paramount Pictures; DreamWorks Pictures
2009	Avatar	20th Century Fox

=== 2010s ===
Year	Films	Studio(s) and Distributor(s)
2010	The A-Team	20th Century Fox
2010	Knight and Day	20th Century Fox
2010	Predators	20th Century Fox
2010	Gulliver's Travels	20th Century Fox
2011	X-Men: First Class	20th Century Fox
2011	Rise of the Planet of the Apes	20th Century Fox
2012	The Avengers	Walt Disney Studios; Paramount Pictures
2012	Prometheus	20th Century Fox
2012	Abraham Lincoln: Vampire Hunter	20th Century Fox
2012	The Hobbit: An Unexpected Journey	Warner Bros./ New Line Cinema Metro Goldwyn Mayer
2013	Iron Man 3	Walt Disney Studios; Paramount Pictures
2013	Man of Steel	Warner Bros.
2013	The Wolverine	20th Century Fox
2013	The Hunger Games: Catching Fire	Lionsgate
2013	The Hobbit: The Desolation of Smaug	Warner Bros./ New Line Cinema Metro Goldwyn Mayer
2014	Godzilla	Warner Bros.
2014	Dawn of the Planet of the Apes	20th Century Fox
2014	The Hobbit: The Battle of the Five Armies	Warner Bros./ New Line Cinema Metro Goldwyn Mayer
2014	What We Do in the Shadows	Paramount Pictures
2015	Furious 7	Universal Studios
2015	Fantastic Four	20th Century Fox
2015	Maze Runner: The Scorch Trials	20th Century Fox
2015	The Hunger Games: Mockingjay - Part 2	Lionsgate
2015	Krampus	Universal Studios
2015	Alvin and the Chipmunks: The Road Chip	20th Century Fox
2016	Deadpool	20th Century Fox
2016	Batman v Superman: Dawn of Justice	Warner Bros.
2016	The Jungle Book	Walt Disney Studios
2016	Central Intelligence	Warner Bros./ New Line Cinema; Universal Studios
2016	Independence Day: Resurgence	20th Century Fox
2016	Hunt for the Wilderpeople	Madman Entertainment
2016	The BFG	Walt Disney Studios
2016	Pete's Dragon	Walt Disney Studios
2017	Spectral	Netflix
2017	Guardians of the Galaxy Vol. 2	Walt Disney Studios
2017	Avatar Flight of Passage	Disney Parks
2017	Wonder Woman	Warner Bros.
2017	War for the Planet of the Apes	20th Century Fox
2017	Valerian and the City of a Thousand Planets	EuropaCorp Distribution; Lionsgate
2017	Justice League	Warner Bros.
2018	Maze Runner: The Death Cure	20th Century Fox
2018	Rampage	Warner Bros./ New Line Cinema
2018	Avengers: Infinity War	Walt Disney Studios
2018	Deadpool 2	20th Century Fox
2018	Animal World	Enlight Pictures
2018	Aquaman	Warner Bros.
2018	Mortal Engines	Universal Studios
2019	Alita: Battle Angel	20th Century Fox
2019	Avengers: Endgame	Walt Disney Studios
2019	Annabelle Comes Home	Warner Bros./ New Line Cinema
2019	Ad Astra	20th Century Fox (under Walt Disney Studios)
2019	Gemini Man	Paramount Pictures
2019	Terminator: Dark Fate	20th Century Fox; Paramount Pictures
2019	Lady and the Tramp	Walt Disney Studios; Disney+
2019	Jumanji: The Next Level	Sony Pictures Releasing / Columbia Pictures

=== 2020s ===
Year	Films	Studio(s) and Distributor(s)
2020	Birds of Prey	Warner Bros.
2020	Mulan	Walt Disney Studios; Disney+
2020	Shadow in the Cloud	Rertical Entertainment; Redbox Entertainment
2020	The Christmas Chronicles 2	Netflix
2020	We Can Be Heroes	Netflix
2021	Zack Snyder's Justice League	Warner Bros.
2021	Godzilla vs. Kong	Warner Bros.
2021	Black Widow	Walt Disney Studios
2021	The Tomorrow War	Amazon Studios; Paramount Pictures
2021	Jungle Cruise	Walt Disney Studios
2021	The Green Knight	A24
2021	The Suicide Squad	Warner Bros.
2021	Shang-Chi and the Legend of the Ten Rings	Walt Disney Studios
2021	Eternals	Walt Disney Studios
2021	The King's Man	20th Century Studios
2022	Kimi	Warner Bros./ New Line Cinema/ HBO Max
2022	No Exit	20th Century Studios
2022	The Batman	Warner Bros.
2022	Doctor Strange in the Multiverse of Madness	Walt Disney Studios
2022	Thor: Love and Thunder	Walt Disney Studios
2022	Black Adam	Warner Bros./ New Line Cinema
2022	Black Panther: Wakanda Forever	Walt Disney Studios
2022	Avatar: The Way of Water	20th Century Studios
2022	Glass Onion: A Knives Out Mystery	Netflix
2023	Cocaine Bear	Universal Pictures
2023	Shazam! Fury of the Gods	Warner Bros./ New Line Cinema
2023	Guardians of the Galaxy Vol. 3	Walt Disney Studios
2023	The Little Mermaid	Walt Disney Studios
2023	Transformers: Rise of the Beasts	Paramount Pictures
2023	The Flash	Warner Bros.
2023	Woaca	Woaca Productions Ltd
2023	Nyad	Netflix
2023	The Creator	20th Century Studios
2023	The Marvels	Walt Disney Studios
2023	Rebel Moon – Part One: A Child of Fire	Netflix
2023	Aquaman and the Lost Kingdom	Warner Bros. Pictures
2024	The Mountain	Piki Films
2024	Godzilla x Kong: The New Empire	Warner Bros. Pictures
2024	Rebel Moon – Part Two: The Scargiver	Netflix
2024	Kingdom of the Planet of the Apes	20th Century Studios
2024	Deadpool & Wolverine	Walt Disney Studios
2024	Alien: Romulus	20th Century Studios
2024	Better Man	Paramount Pictures
2024	Carry-On	Netflix
2025	Captain America: Brave New World	Walt Disney Studios
2025	A Minecraft Movie	Warner Bros. Pictures
2025	Fountain of Youth	Apple TV+
2025	Superman	Warner Bros. Pictures
2025	The Fantastic Four: First Steps	Walt Disney Studios
2025	Predator: Badlands	20th Century Studios
2025	Avatar: Fire and Ash	20th Century Studios
2026	In the Blink of an Eye	Searchlight Pictures
2026	Moana	Walt Disney Studios
2026	Resident Evil	Sony Pictures Releasing / Columbia Pictures/TriStar Pictures
2026	Wildwood	Laika Fathom Entertainment

=== Upcoming ===
Year	Films	Studio(s) and Distributor(s)
2026	Avengers: Doomsday	Walt Disney Studios
2027	Children of Blood and Bone	Paramount Pictures
2027	Narnia: The Magician's Nephew	Netflix Sony Pictures Releasing / Columbia Pictures
2027	The Legend of Zelda	Sony Pictures Releasing / Columbia Pictures
2027	The Lord of The Rings: The Hunt for Gollum	Warner Bros. Pictures / New Line Cinema

== Animation ==
Year	Films	Distributor(s)
2011	The Adventures of Tintin: The Secret of the Unicorn	Paramount Pictures / Sony Pictures Releasing
2020	Meerkat	Epic Games
2022	Overwatch 2: The Wastelander	Blizzard Entertainment
2023	War Is Over!	ElectroLeague
2024	The Lord of the Rings: The War of the Rohirrim	Warner Bros. Pictures / New Line Cinema

== Television ==
=== 1990s ===
Year	Series	Network
1995	Tales from the Crypt (Season 6); Episode: "You, Murderer"	HBO

=== 2010s ===
Year	Series	Network
2017	Game of Thrones (Season 7)	HBO
2019	Game of Thrones (Season 8)	HBO
2019	The Umbrella Academy (Season 1)	Netflix

=== 2020s ===
Year	Series	Network
2020	Space Force (Season 1)	Netflix
2020	The Umbrella Academy (Season 2)	Netflix
2020	The Wilds (Season 1)	Amazon Prime Video
2021	The Falcon and the Winter Soldier	Disney+
2021	Mr. Corman	Apple TV+
2021	Invasion (Season 1)	Apple TV+
2021	Hawkeye	Disney+
2022	Peacemaker (Season 1)	HBO Max
2022	Moon Knight	Disney+
2022	Star Wars: Obi-Wan Kenobi	Disney+
2022	The Umbrella Academy (Season 3)	Netflix
2022	She-Hulk: Attorney at Law	Disney+
2022	The Lord of the Rings: The Rings of Power (Season 1)	Amazon Prime Video
2023	The Last of Us (Season 1)	HBO
2023	Invasion (Season 2)	Apple TV+
2023	Monarch: Legacy of Monsters (Season 1)	Apple TV+
2024	Masters of the Air	Apple TV+
2024	Ripley	Netflix
2024	House of the Dragon (Season 2)	HBO
2024	The Umbrella Academy (Season 4)	Netflix
2024	Star Wars: Skeleton Crew	Disney+
2025	The Last of Us (Season 2)	HBO
2025	Peacemaker (Season 2)	HBO Max
2025	Stranger Things (Season 5)	Netflix
2026	House of the Dragon (Season 3)	HBO

=== Television films & specials ===
Year	Films	Network
2022	The Guardians of the Galaxy Holiday Special	Disney+

== See also ==
- Wētā Workshop
- WingNut Films
- Industrial Light & Magic
- Moving Picture Company (MPC)
- Blur Studio
- Animal Logic
- Blue Sky Studios
- Pacific Data Images
- Framestore
- Digital Domain
- DNEG
- Sony Pictures Imageworks
- Rhythm & Hues Studios
- Image Engine
- Visual Works
- Pixar
- Mainframe Studios
- Sunrise Productions
- Reel FX Animation
- House of Cool
- Pixomondo
