= Justin H. Min =

American actor (born 1989)

- Born: Justin Hong-Kee Min; March 20, 1990 (age 36); Cerritos, California, U.S.
- Education: Cornell University (BA)
- Occupation: Actor
- Years active: 2012–present
- Relatives: Ashley Park (second cousin)

Justin Hong-Kee Min (born March 20, 1990) is an American actor. He began his acting career with roles in several Wong Fu productions. He is known for portraying Ben Hargreeves in the Netflix original series The Umbrella Academy (2019–2024), and for portraying the title role in After Yang (2021).

== Early life and education ==
Min is a second-generation Korean American from Cerritos, California. He is improving his Korean, and wishes to participate in more Korean productions. He is also a second cousin of Ashley Park. Min is a Christian, and still uses the Bible his parents gave him when he was in middle school.

He graduated from Cerritos High School in 2007. He then attended Cornell University, where he served on the Student Assembly as the Minority Liaison; he graduated from the school's College of Arts & Sciences in 2011 with degrees in Government and English.

== Career ==
Prior to acting, Min was a journalist and photographer for various magazines. He completed photography assignments for the J.A.M. Awards, inVISIBLE, and The Served.

Min began acting in 2012. His early roles include appearances on TV series Faking It, CSI: Cyber, and Pure Genius. He is a collaborator of Wong Fu Productions, an independent production company based in Los Angeles, having starred in their 2017 short film How I Became an Adult and their 2019 web series Dating After College, among other projects.

In 2019, Min began starring in the Netflix series The Umbrella Academy as Ben Hargreeves. He was promoted to the main cast, from recurring character, in the second season. As the character was only shown in flashbacks in the comic books, Min was not part of the early publicity for the series in order to keep his role a secret. Min also used the expanded role in the television show to develop the character "from the ground up", and worked closely with Ethan Hwang, who played a young Ben, to ensure a "similar essence".

In April 2019, it was announced that Min had been cast in a main role in the science fiction film After Yang, starring Colin Farrell. The film was expected to be released in 2020 but was delayed to 2021 due to the COVID-19 pandemic.

Min participated in the second season of The Devil's Plan, a Korean Netflix reality competition series, streamed in May 2025, and was the 6th player eliminated.

== Filmography ==
=== Film ===
| Year | Title | Role | Notes |
|---|---|---|---|
| 2016 | Rebirth | Intern #2 | |
| 2021 | After Yang | Yang | |
| 2023 | Shortcomings | Ben Tagawa | |
| 2024 | The Greatest Hits | David Park | |
| 2024 | Detained | Isaac Barsi | |
| 2024 | Turn Me On | Christopher | |
| 2025 | Lost in Starlight | Jay (voice) | English dub |
| 2025 | Untitled Home Invasion Romance | Stu Cho | |
| 2025 | Journey There | Min-jun | |
| 2026 | Handle With Care | Cole | Post-production |
| 2026 | Slide Strum Mute | Nam-gi | |
| 2026 | Callback | Max | Short Film |

=== Television ===
| Year | Title | Role | Notes/Ref. |
|---|---|---|---|
| 2014 | Discord and Harmony | Michael | Episode: "You Think You Know Someone" |
| 2014 | Faking It | Bobby | Episodes: "The Ecstasy and the Agony", "Busted"; as Justin Min |
| 2015 | CSI: Cyber | College Kid | Episode: "Crowd Sourced" |
| 2016 | Pure Genius | Eugene | Episode: "Bunker Hill, We Have a Problem" |
| 2018 | Beerfest: Thirst for Victory | Kyle | Television film |
| 2019–2024 | The Umbrella Academy | Ben Hargreeves | Recurring role (season 1), main role (seasons 2–4); 36 episodes |
| 2019 | Dating After College | Cameron | Miniseries; main role; 7 episodes |
| 2020 | New Amsterdam | Jason Huang | Episode: "Liftoff" |
| 2023 | Beef | Edwin | Recurring role |
| 2025 | The Devil's Plan | Contestant | Second season |

=== Podcast ===
| Year | Title | Role | Notes |
|---|---|---|---|
| 2022 | Love and Noraebang | Jaesun Choi | Recurring role |

=== Theater ===
| Year | Title | Role | Notes |
|---|---|---|---|
| 2026 | Data | Alex | Off-Broadway, Lucille Lortel Theatre |
