= Yusuf Gatewood =

American actor (b. 1982)

- Born: September 12, 1982 (age 42); Hillsborough, North Carolina
- Occupation: Actor
- Years active: 2000–present
- Notable work: The Originals; The Umbrella Academy

Yusuf Gatewood (born Joseph Keith Gatewood, September 12, 1982) is an American actor best known for playing Vincent Griffith in The Originals and Doug in the 2005 film The Interpreter. His television work includes guest roles on the television series Hack (2003), Law & Order: Criminal Intent (2003), CSI: Crime Scene Investigation (2006) and CSI: Miami (2007). In 2020, he played the main cast role of Raymond Chestnut for season 2 of The Umbrella Academy.

== Filmography ==
Film roles
Year	Title	Role	Notes
2000	Wonder Boys	Howard	
2005	The Interpreter	Doug	
2016	Barbershop: The Next Cut	Derek	

Television roles
Year	Title	Role	Notes
2003	Hack	Truby	Episode: "Forgive, But Don't Forget"
2003	Law & Order: Criminal Intent	Detective Lewis	Episode: "Stray"
2006	CSI: Crime Scene Investigation	DJ	Episode: "Built to Kill: Part 1"
2007	CSI: Miami	Gary Howardwick	Episode: "Bang, Bang, Your Debt"
2008	Lincoln Heights		Episode: "Glass House"
2008	Mask of the Ninja	Ed	TV movie
2014–2018	The Originals	Vincent Griffith / Finn Mikaelson	Guest role (season 1); Main role (season 2–5)
2019	Good Omens	Famine	2019 Jacob’s Ladder Troubled Vet
2020, 2022	The Umbrella Academy	Raymond Chestnut	Main Cast (season 2); Recurring (season 3)
