= Jimmy Philémond-Montout =

Canadian-Martiniquais Author and Film Producer

- Born: 6 November 1986 (age 39); Canada
- Occupations: Screenwriter, film producer, film director, investor, writer

Jimmy Philémond-Montout (born 6 November 1986) is a Canadian-Martiniquais author, investor, film producer, film director and screenwriter.

== Selected filmography ==
- Galeriens (2007)
- Closed Door (2008)
- Popol- Vuh (2009)
- Our New Wave (2010)

Producer

- In the Shadow (2010)
- Sora no Otoshimono Final: Eternal My Master (2014)
- Let's Go, JETS! (2017)
- Getaway (2025)

Actor

- La Horde (2008)

== Publications ==
=== Novels ===
- To Build a Home (2021)
- Ride of the Valkyries (2021)
