= Cameron Britton =

American actor (born 1986)

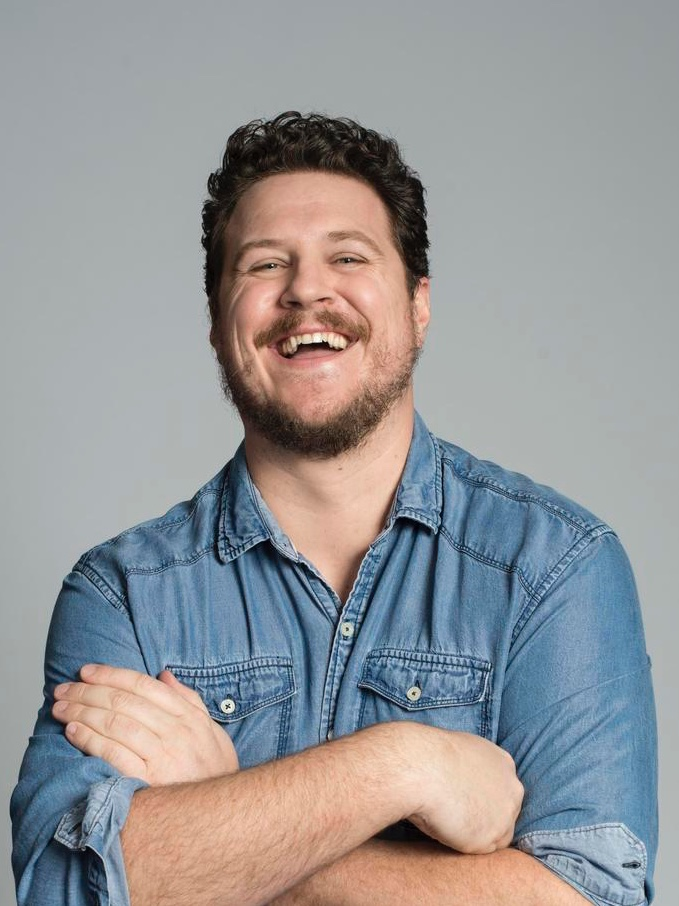
- Britton in 2017
- Born: June 6, 1986 (age 40); Burlington, Ontario, Canada
- Education: Analy High School
- Occupation: Actor
- Years active: 2014–present

Cameron Britton (born June 6, 1986) is an American actor known for his role as Ed Kemper in the Netflix crime drama television series Mindhunter, for which he received a Primetime Emmy Award nomination for Outstanding Guest Actor in a Drama Series, and Hazel in the Netflix television series The Umbrella Academy.

== Early life ==
Britton grew up in Sonoma County, California, graduating from Analy High School in Sebastopol in 2004. He worked as a preschool teacher for eight years, where he taught children with additional support needs ranging from 18 months to 3 years old.

== Career ==
Britton had his breakout role as Ed Kemper in the 2017 Netflix crime drama Mindhunter. He played hacker Plague in the 2018 crime thriller film The Girl in the Spider's Web. In the Netflix TV show The Umbrella Academy, he played the role of Hazel, a time-travelling assassin.

He stars as the falsely suspected 1996 Olympic Games bomber Richard Jewell in the second season of the Manhunt drama anthology series.

In September 2024, he was cast in a recurring role on the superhero series Spider-Noir.

== Filmography ==
=== Film ===
Year	Film	Role	Notes
2014	Camp Takota	Chet	
2014	Redeemed	Alex	
2014	Vice Versa	Tony	Short film
2015	Day Out Of Days	Mick	
2018	The Girl in the Spider's Web	Plague	
2022	A Man Called Otto	Jimmy	
2025	Mickey 17	Arkady	
2026	Hope	Va'migere	

=== Television ===
Year	Show	Role	Notes
2014	Unusual Suspects	Jeffrey Boyd	Episode: "Brute Force"
2014	Lab Rats	Security Guard	Episode: "Alien Gladiators"
2014	Vox Influx	Casper Simmons	Episode: "Vox"
2015	Battle Creek	Oliver Nathan	Episode: "Sympathy for the devil"
2015–2017	Stitchers	Tim/Engineering Manager	Main (22 episodes)
2017–2019	Mindhunter	Ed Kemper	Recurring (4 episodes); Nominated — Primetime Emmy Award for Outstanding Guest Actor in a Drama Series
2017	S.W.A.T.	Patrick	Episode: "Imposters"
2018	Barry	Detective Charlie Simmer	Recurring (2 episodes)
2019–2020; 2024	The Umbrella Academy	Hazel	Main role (season 1); Guest (seasons 2, 4)
2020	Manhunt: Deadly Games	Richard Jewell	Main
2021	Shrill	Will	Recurring (4 episodes)
2022	The Woman in the House Across the Street from the Girl in the Window	Buell	Recurring
2024	It's Florida, Man	John	Episode: "Saucy"
2026	Spider-Noir	Patrick Donegal	Recurring
2026	Paradise	Gary Jones	Recurring
2027	Wild Things	David Neal	Upcoming miniseries

== Awards and nominations ==
Year	Work	Award	Category	Result
2017	Mindhunter	IGN Summer Movie Awards	Best Dramatic TV Performance	Nominated
2018	Mindhunter	Online Film & Television Association Awards	Best Guest Actor in a Drama Series	Won
2018	Mindhunter	Primetime Emmy Award	Outstanding Guest Actor in a Drama Series	Nominated
2018	Mindhunter	Gold Derby Awards	Drama Guest Actor	Won
2018	N/A	Gold Derby Awards	Breakthrough Performer of the Year	Nominated
2019	Mindhunter	Gold Derby Awards	Drama Guest Actor of the Decade	Nominated
