= Cameron Brodeur =

Canadian actor (born 2002)

- Born: April 25, 2002 (age 24); Montreal, Quebec, Canada
- Occupation: Actor
- Years active: 2015-present
- Notable work: The Umbrella Academy, Helix, Midway

Cameron Brodeur (born April 25, 2002) is a Canadian actor, most noted for his recurring role as Young Luther Hargreeves in The Umbrella Academy on Netflix. He also gained recognition after playing the supporting role of Sully Brown in Midway, which marked his first theatrical appearance. He was nominated at the Young Artist Awards for Best Performance in a Feature Film by a Teen Artist and Best Performance in a Streaming Series by a Teen Artist, and won that same category the year prior. He also won Best Television Ensemble and Best Actor in a Recurring Role at The Joey Awards.

== Life and career ==
Cameron Brodeur was born in Montreal, Quebec, to French-speaking parents, but is fluent in both English and his mother tongue. Cameron started to pursue acting at the age of 10, and made his on-screen debut portraying Soren in the second series of Helix. Since, Cameron has starred in Amber Alert (2016), Amélie et Compagnie (2017-2019), Ghostwriter (2019), and Midway (2019).

Cameron's most recent project is portraying young Luther in The Umbrella Academy on Netflix. He won the Teen Actor in a Streaming Series category at the Young Artist Awards in 2019, and was nominated for two other awards for that same project.

== Filmography ==
=== Film ===
Year	Title	Role	Notes
2016	Amber Alert	Oliver Cross	
2018	Milk	Actor	Short film
2018	Everything Outside	Étienne	
2019	Midway	Sully Brown	

=== Television ===
Year	Title	Role	Notes
2015	Helix	Soren	6 episodes
2015	The Art of More	Young Graham	
2016	Fatal Vows	Charlie	
2017	The Bold Type	James Carlyle	
2017-2019	Amélie et Compagnie	Mathieu	44 episodes
2019	Ghostwriter	Camarillo Kid	3 episodes
2019-2020	The Umbrella Academy	Young Luther	
2020	L'Effet Secondaire	Matthew	

== Awards and nominations ==
Year	Award	Category	Work	Result
2019	The Joey Awards	Best Television or Webseries Ensemble	The Umbrella Academy	Won
2019	The Joey Awards	Best Actor in a Recurring Role Television Drama 14+	The Umbrella Academy	Won
2019	Young Artist Awards	Best Performance in a Streaming Series or Film: Teen Actor	The Umbrella Academy	Won
2020	Young Artist Awards	Best Performance in a Streaming Series - Leading Teen Artist	Ghostwriter	Nominated
2020	Young Artist Awards	Best Performance in a Feature Film - Teen Artist	Midway	Nominated
