= Steve Blackman (writer) =

Canadian television writer and producer

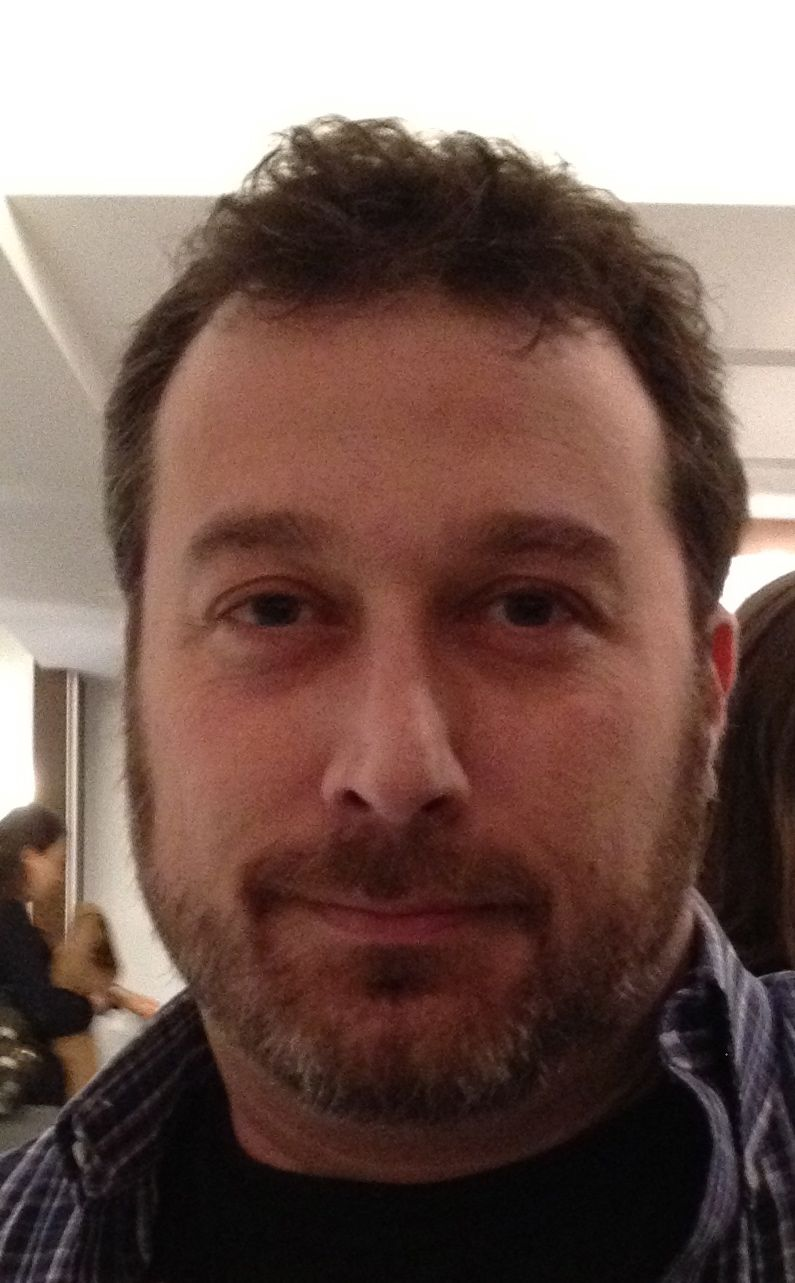
- Blackman in 2011
- Occupations: Television writer, television director, television producer, showrunner
- Years active: 1999–present
- Known for: The Umbrella Academy; Fargo; Altered Carbon

Steve Blackman is a Canadian television screenwriter, and executive producer. He served as the showrunner for The Umbrella Academy, a Netflix series based on the comic series of the same name by Gerard Way and Gabriel Bá. In 2016, Blackman won a Writers Guild of America Award for the second season of Fargo along with his fellow writers. In 2017, he was nominated for an Emmy for his work on Fargo along with other producers.

== Early and personal life ==
Blackman grew up in Edmonton, Canada. As a law student at the University of Alberta in 1996, he founded Law Show, an annual stage production written and performed by law students. As of 2018, it has raised over $300,000 for local charities. He also attended high school in Edmonton, Canada, at Ross Sheppard High School.

After The Umbrella Academy was being accused of antisemitism, Blackman released a statement saying: "The accusation of anti-Semitism in The Umbrella Academy is hurtful and, more importantly, factually incorrect. I wrote these episodes, created the character, and am myself Jewish. While I understand audiences sometimes receive things in a different way than creators intend, The Handler was not created as an anti-Semitic character."

== Career ==
Blackman passed the bar in 1998 and worked briefly as a divorce lawyer. Unhappy as a lawyer, he teamed with Greg Ball, another newly-practising lawyer, and together they created The Associates, a drama series based on their experiences as recent law school graduates. Ball and Blackman pitched and sold the series to CTV at the Banff Television Festival in 1999. When it aired, The Associates was the most expensive television series ever made in Canada. He produced 30 episodes of The Associates, which aired in 2001 and 2002.

In addition to his credits as a writer and producer on television shows, including Bones and Fargo, Blackman served as an executive producer and co-showrunner on Private Practice, Legion, and co-showrunner on Altered Carbon.

On November 9, 2017, Blackman was announced as an executive producer and showrunner of the Netflix series The Umbrella Academy.

In 2020, it was announced Blackman signed a multi-year overall deal with Netflix and would continue to produce The Umbrella Academy in addition to other projects under the company name, Borderline Entertainment. In 2022, Blackman announced his newly renamed company, Irish Cowboy Productions, would be developing two new projects: Horizon Zero Dawn and Orbital.

In 2024, actor Elliot Page, who plays a major role in the series and recently announced they had transitioned in 2020, praised Blackman for his support and collaboration, saying "he was the one who was very insistent on me having it be a part of the show and supported me to be able to access the care I was hoping to get at that time."

== Controversy ==
In June 2024, a report by Rolling Stone accused Blackman of creating a toxic working environment for writers and support staff. An HR complaint against Blackman, dating back to January 2023, detailed his "long history of toxic, bullying, manipulative, and retaliatory behavior." According to Universal Content Productions, Blackman worked with UCP's HR department to ensure the women’s contracts were concluded "in full compliance with all policies and regulations," and the decision was "solely based on performance and budget." Blackman also denied any other allegations of retaliation.

== Filmography ==
Year	Series	Notes
2001–2002	The Associates	Co-creator, producer (30 episodes)
2003–2005	Wild Card	Writer, supervising producer (36 episodes)
2004	NYPD Blue	Writer (1 episode)
2005–2006	Bones	Writer (3 episodes), producer (21 episodes)
2007	Hidden Palms	Writer (1 episode), producer (8 episodes)
2007–2008	Las Vegas	Writer (2 episodes), supervising producer (19 episodes)
2008–2012	Private Practice	Co-showrunner; writer (10 episodes), executive producer (44 episodes), co-executive producer (45 episodes)
2014–2017	Fargo	Writer (2 episodes), Co-executive producer (10 episodes), consulting producer (20 episodes)
2016	Outsiders	Consulting producer (13 episodes)
2017	Legion	Executive producer (4 episodes)
2017–2018	Altered Carbon	Writer (2 episodes), executive producer (10 episodes)
2019–2024	The Umbrella Academy	Creator, showrunner, writer, executive producer
