= Emmy Raver-Lampman =

American actress, singer (b. 1988)

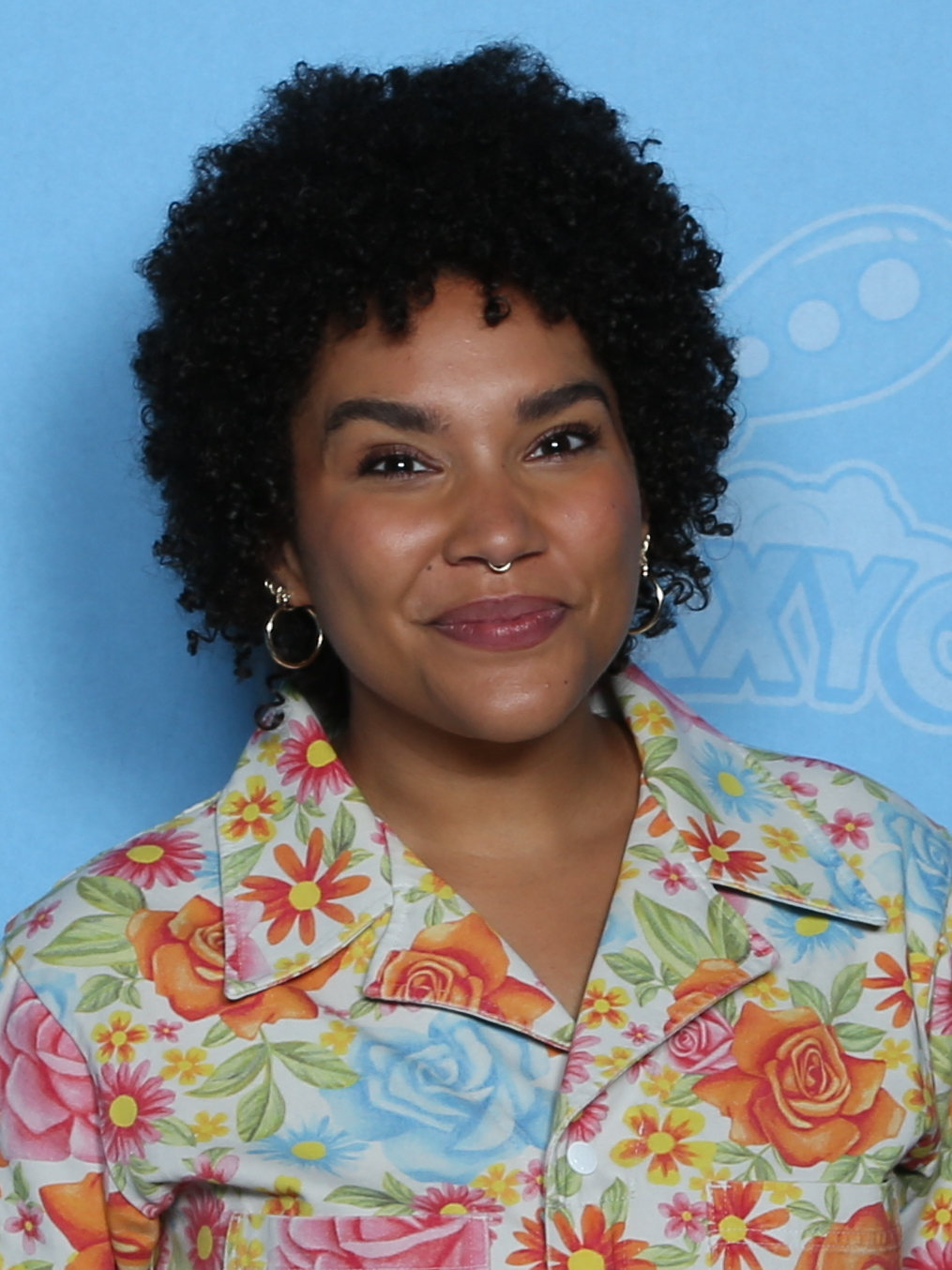
- Raver-Lampman in 2022
- Born: Emily Christine Raver Lampman; September 5, 1988 (age 38); Norfolk, Virginia, U.S.
- Education: Marymount Manhattan College
- Occupations: Actress; singer
- Years active: 2010–present
- Partner: Daveed Diggs (2015–present)
- Children: 1

Emmy Raver-Lampman (born Emily Christine Raver Lampman; September 5, 1988) is an American actress and singer. She began her career working in musical theater, and has performed in various Broadway and national touring productions such as Hair, Jekyll & Hyde, Wicked, and Hamilton. She played Allison Hargreeves in the Netflix series The Umbrella Academy.

== Early life and education ==
Raver-Lampman was born and raised in Norfolk, Virginia. She was adopted as a newborn; her mother Sharon is a professor at Old Dominion University, while her father Greg is a writer and teacher. She was raised an only child, has traveled widely (over 50 countries) and lived in the Czech Republic, Ukraine and India when she was young due to her mother's work. She has a half-sister, who is her junior by twenty years.

She attended a performing arts high school, Governor's School for the Arts, as well as Maury High in Norfolk. She then attended Marymount Manhattan College in New York City. She began working as a professional actress while in school and began studying remotely for her junior year. She landed a part in a production of Hair, and she left her course temporarily with just a semester left before graduation, but eventually returned to graduate with a Bachelor of Arts in Theater in 2012.

== Career ==
=== Musical theatre ===
Raver-Lampman's career began in musical theatre. Her first professional theater role was in a May 2010 production of Children of Eden, produced by the Astoria Performing Arts Center. She auditioned for the musical while she was a sophomore at college and won a leading role. She then auditioned for and subsequently joined the 2010 national tour of Hair, from which she earned her Equity card.

Raver-Lampman made her Broadway debut in Summer 2011, when Hair made a return to Broadway with its touring production. She left Hair when the production closed on Broadway that September. The following fall, Raver-Lampman joined the 3rd national tour of the musical Jekyll & Hyde as an ensemble member and understudy for the lead role, Lucy Harris. The production transferred to Broadway in April 2013 for a two-month limited engagement but closed after a month. Later in 2013, Raver-Lampman was cast in the Broadway original production of A Night with Janis Joplin. She performed as a swing until the show closed in February 2014 and was subsequently cast in the first U.S. tour of the musical Wicked as a standby for the lead role of Elphaba.

Following her one-year contract with Wicked, Raver-Lampman returned to New York in March 2015, and later auditioned for one of the two ensemble roles that Hamilton was adding to its show after its Off-Broadway run. She was cast and became part of the original ensemble cast of Hamilton on Broadway, as well as an understudy for all three lead female roles: Angelica, Eliza, and Peggy/Maria Reynolds. Hamilton opened in August 2015. In September 2015, Raver-Lampman was part of a star-studded reading of an original rock musical titled Galileo. In December of that year, she took part in an MCC Theater workshop of Alice By Heart.

In January 2016, it was announced that she was cast as Pearl Krabs in the Chicago production tryout of the musical SpongeBob SquarePants. She left Hamilton in April 2016, and is one of the two original cast members who did not take part in the filming of the production. She returned to Hamilton later that year as an original member of the show's Chicago production, which began previews in September 2016. In March 2017, she joined the show's first national tour, starring as Angelica. She toured with the show until the end of 2017, performing in San Francisco and Los Angeles.

In late 2019, it was announced that she would be joining her former Hamilton castmate Solea Pfeiffer as co-stars of the new original musical Gun & Powder, directed by Robert O'Hara. The show had a month-long regional engagement in Arlington, Virginia, which opened on January 28, 2020.

Raver-Lampman was featured on the 2019 album Seven Nights in Chicago by Daveed Diggs and Rafael Casal.

=== Film and television ===
Raver-Lampman landed her first major television role in 2017, portraying Allison Hargreeves in The Umbrella Academy, opposite actors Elliot Page and Tom Hopper, among others. The show was filmed during the first half of 2018 and was released on Netflix in February 2019. The show was Netflix's third most popular series in 2019, with more than 45 million viewers. Raver-Lampman filmed the second season over five months in 2019, with the season premiering in July 2020.

Throughout 2019, she also had guest roles in television shows like A Million Little Things and Jane the Virgin. In July 2020, it was announced that Raver-Lampman would be replacing Kristen Bell as the voice of Molly Tillerman in the Apple TV+ series Central Park. The announcement came after Bell resigned from her role, due to a controversy over her performance as a mixed-race character. Raver-Lampman voiced Molly in the second season of the series.

Raver-Lampman had a number of roles in films, including major roles as Mira Jones in Blacklight, and FBI Agent Verona Parker in The Beekeeper.

== Personal life ==
Raver-Lampman is in a relationship with Daveed Diggs, whom she met in 2015 while they were performing together in Hamilton. They announced the birth of their son in March 2024. Raver-Lampman and Diggs are expecting their second child.

== Acting credits ==
Key
†	Denotes films that have not yet been released

=== Film ===
Year	Title	Role	Notes
2019	Stucco	Relaxer	Short film
2020	aTypical Wednesday	Millie	
2021	Untitled Horror Movie	Alex	Also executive producer
2022	Dog	Bella	
2022	Blacklight	Mira Jones	
2022	Gatlopp	Sam	
2024	The Beekeeper	FBI Agent Verona Parker	
2027	The Beekeeper 2 †	FBI Agent Verona Parker	Post-production

=== Television ===
Year	Title	Role	Notes
2016	Odd Mom Out	Woman on Date	Episode: "Hamming It Up"
2018	A Million Little Things	Rebecca	Episode: "Friday Night Dinner"
2019	American Dad!	Travel Agent	Voice; episode: "Stompe le Monde"
2019	Jane the Virgin	Lily Lofton	Episodes: "Chapter Ninety-seven"; "Chapter Ninety-eight"
2019	Robot Chicken	Peppermint / Boy's Mother	Voice; episode: "Robot Chicken's Santa's Dead (Spoiler Alert) Holiday Murder Thing Special"
2019–2024	The Umbrella Academy	Allison Hargreeves / Number Three / The Rumor	Main cast
2021–2022	Central Park	Molly Tillerman	Voice; main cast (seasons 2-3)
2022	Nailed It!	Herself	Guest judge; episode: "Umbrella Academy"
2022	Family Guy	Mary Elizabeth Becca Ryan	Voice; episode: "Get Stewie"
2022	Tuca & Bertie	Baking mentee	Voice; episode: "Salad Days"
2023	Heels	Jen Lussier	Main cast (Season 2)

=== Theater ===
Year	Title	Role	Venue	Notes
2010	Children of Eden	Eve / Mama Noah	Astoria Performing Arts Center: May 2010	Off-off-Broadway production
2010–2011	Hair	Ensemble; Understudy: Dionne, Abraham Lincoln	National Tour: October 2010 – June 2011	National tour
2010–2011	Hair	Ensemble; Understudy: Dionne, Abraham Lincoln	St. James Theatre: July – September 2011	Broadway return of tour
2012–2013	Jekyll & Hyde	Ensemble; Understudy: Lucy Harris	National Tour: October 2012 – March 2013	Third national tour
2012–2013	Jekyll & Hyde	Ensemble; Understudy: Lucy Harris	Marquis Theatre: April – May 2013	Broadway revival
2013–2014	A Night with Janis Joplin	Swing; Understudy: Joplinaires	Lyceum Theatre: October 2013 – February 2014	Original Broadway cast
2014–2015	Wicked	Elphaba (standby)	National Tour: February 2014 – March 2015	First national tour replacement
2015–2017	Hamilton	Ensemble; Understudy: Angelica, Eliza, Peggy / Maria Reynolds	Richard Rodgers Theatre: July 2015 – April 2016	Original Broadway production
2015–2017	Hamilton	Ensemble; Understudy: Angelica, Eliza, Peggy / Maria Reynolds	Eliza Tour: September 2016 – February 2017	Chicago production
2015–2017	Hamilton	Angelica	Angelica Tour: March – December 2017	First national tour
2016	SpongeBob SquarePants	Pearl Krabs	Oriental Theatre: June – July 2016	Original Chicago production
2020	Gun & Powder	Martha	Signature Theatre: January – February 2020	Original Virginia production

== Discography ==
- Hamilton (Original Broadway Cast Recording) (2015); company member
- Bonnie and Clyde and a Whole Lotta Jazz (Live at 54 Below) (2016), composed by Frank Wildhorn; featured vocalist
- SpongeBob SquarePants, The New Musical (2017); company member and featured on "Daddy Knows Best"
- Blindspotting: The Collin EP (2018), by Daveed Diggs and Rafael Casal; featured artist on "Something in the Water"
- The Umbrella Academy (Original Series Soundtrack) (2019), composed by Jeff Russo; featured vocalist on "Stormy Weather"
- Seven Nights in Chicago (2019), by Daveed Diggs and Rafael Casal; featured artist on "At this Point" and "No Feels"
- The Good & The Bad (2019), by Anthony Ramos; background vocalist on "Come Back Home"
- Three Points of Contact (2019), concept album composed by Ryan Scott Oliver; featured artist on "Bleed You Dry"
