= The Elaborate Entrance of Chad Deity =

2009 dramatic comedy play by Kristoffer Diaz

- Original language: English
- Written by: Kristoffer Diaz
- Characters: Vigneshwar Paduar; Chad Deity; Macedonio Guerra; Billy Heartland; Old Glory; Everett K. Olson
- Genre: dramatic comedy

Premiere
- Date: September 25, 2009
- Place: Biograph Theater

The Elaborate Entrance of Chad Deity is a dramatic comedy play by Kristoffer Diaz about a professional wrestler, "driven by narratives of the American dream and neoliberal capitalism."

== Synopsis ==
=== Act One ===
Macedonio Guerra is a professional wrestler at THE Wrestling. Despite being the superior wrestler Mace is delegated to playing the heel to the champion, Chad Deity. Everett K Olson, CEO of THE Wrestling, capitalizes on racial stereotypes to win support from the audience. Tired of being “the guy who loses to make the winners look good,'' Mace recruits Vigneshwar Paduar (VP) to THE Wrestling. Unable to fit the racially ambiguous VP into his show, Olson initially refuses. But with the help of Chad Deity, Olson brings VP on as The Fundamentalist, with Mace playing his partner, Che Chavez Castro. The pair, billed as anti-American extremists, quickly become fan favorite villains. Act One ends with The Fundamentalist calling out Chad Deity on stage.

=== Epilogue ===
VP watches the fight from his home in bed. He is happy to see Macedonio Guerra on stage, not Che Chavez Castro. In the final moments of the play, Mace is powerbombed by Chad Deity. Prompting his girlfriend to ask “Why are they rooting for the bad guy?”

== Production history ==
The Elaborate Entrance of Chad Deity had its world premier at Chicago's Biograph Theater on September 25, 2009 in a Victory Gardens Theater production starring Usman Ally (Vigneshwar Paduar), Kamal Angelo Bolden (Chad Deity), Desmin Borges (Macedonio Guerra), Jim Krag (Everett K. Olson), and Christian Litke (Billy Heartland, Old Glory).

Directed by Edward Torres, Designed by Brian Sidney Bembridge (scenery), Jesse Klug (lights), John Boesche (projections), and Christine Pascual (costumes)

Other Productions
Theater	Location	Date	Ref.
InterAct Theatre Company	Philadelphia, Pennsylvania	October 2009	
Mixed Blood Theatre Company	Minneapolis, Minnesota	April 2010	
Second Stage Theater	New York City, New York	May 2010	
Geffen Playhouse	Los Angeles, California	September 2011	
Actors Theatre of Louisville	Louisville, Kentucky	January 2012	
Woolly Mammoth Theatre Company	Washington, D.C.	September 2012	
Curious Theatre Company	Denver, Colorado	September 2012	
Dallas Theater Center	Dallas, Texas	October 2012	
Carolina Actors Studio Theatre	Charlotte, North Carolina	April 2013	
Capital Stage	Sacramento, California	July 2013	
Barebones Productions	Pittsburgh, Pennsylvania	February 2017	
Play-PerView	Online reading via Zoom	August 2020	
Profile Theatre	Portland, Oregon	October 2022	
Zach Theatre	Austin, TX	October 2022	

== Reception ==
Variety (magazine) published a positive review of the original production at the Biograph Theater, complimenting the "vigorous physicality and wickedly intelligent humor." Critic Steve Oxman commented that "[Kristoffer] Diaz has found a vehicle to tell a much deeper narrative about how our culture digests racial identity, and how commerce, as well as commercial storytelling, is at its core about generating passion, with the exploitation of our baser instincts often the easiest means of doing so."

The New York Times said the production at the Off Broadway Second Stage Theatre "has the delicious crackle and pop of a galloping, honest-to-God, all-American satire." The New York Daily News called the same production, "flashy, fleshy and ridiculously entertaining". The Los Angeles Times said the play "leaps out of the proscenium frame at every opportunity, exhorting, drop-kicking and body-slamming its way into an immediacy that is more familiar to sporting events and rap concerts than to a traditional night of theater."

== Awards and nominations ==
- Winner 2008 National Latino Playwriting Award
- Finalist for the 2010 Pulitzer Prize for Drama.
- Winner 2011 Obie Award for Best New American Play.
- New York Times Outstanding Playwright Award to Kristoffer Diaz (for Chad Deity) in 2011
- Henry Hewes Design Awards Nomination for Best Scenic Design Brian Sidney Bembridge
- Henry Hewes Design Awards Nomination for Best Production Design Brian Sidney Bembridge, Jesse Klug, Christine Pasquale, Peter Nigrini, and Mikhail Fiksel
- Chicago Jeff Awards (2010) for Best New Work, Best Director, Best Actor and Best Fight Choreography
