= Ian Merrigan =

American actor (born 1983)

- Education: North Carolina School of the Arts (BA)
- Occupations: actor, playwright

Ian Merrigan (born February 12, 1983) is an American actor, playwright and musician known for his roles in Paradise and The Chi.

Merrigan gained recognition for his portrayal of Trent, the town librarian in the 2025 Hulu series Paradise.

His musical, The Unfortunates, co-created by Merrigan, Jon Beavers, Ramiz Monsef, Casey Hurt, and Kristoffer Diaz, premiered at the Oregon Shakespeare Festival in 2013. It was later produced at ACT San Francisco in 2016 before being made available for theatrical licensing in 2021 with Uproar Theatrics.
