= Nicole Brydon Bloom =

American actress (born 1994)

- Born: March 23, 1994 (age 32); Chicago, Illinois, U.S.
- Education: Elon University
- Occupation: Actress
- Years active: 2013–present
- Spouse: Justin Theroux (m. 2025)
- Children: 1
- Parent: David Bloom (father)

Nicole Brydon Bloom (born March 23, 1994) is an American actress. Starting with bit parts in 2013, she came to attention in 2023 with a recurring role in season 2 of the HBO series The Gilded Age, followed by joining the main cast character of Agent Jane Driscoll, starting in 2025, in the Hulu series Paradise.

== Early life ==
The daughter of Melanie and David Bloom, a television news journalist, she was nine years old when her father died in April 2003 as he was covering the war in Iraq. She graduated from Elon University in 2017 with a degree in acting despite first enrolling with a journalism major.

== Career ==
She had early screen appearances in long-running television series The Affair and Law & Order: Special Victims Unit. In 2019, she had the lead role in horror film 1BR.

She appeared as Maud Beaton, based on real life swindler Cassie Chadwick, in seasons two and three of The Gilded Age. That series was nominated for Best Ensemble in a Drama Series at the 30th Screen Actors Guild Awards.

In 2024, she appeared in historical drama We Were the Lucky Ones. That year, she had a main role as Agent Jane Driscoll in the Dan Fogelman series Paradise alongside Sterling K. Brown. In December 2024, it was confirmed that shooting for her film Handle with Care, co-starring alongside Justin H. Min, had been completed.

In 2026, she reprised her role in the second season of Paradise.

== Personal life ==
In August 2024, she became engaged to fellow actor Justin Theroux after he proposed in Venice, Italy. The pair had publicly revealed their relationship the year prior. The couple married in March 2025. In December 2025 they announced they were expecting their first child together. Bloom announced that she gave birth to a son on April 18, 2026.

== Filmography ==
Key
†	Denotes works that have not yet been released

=== Film ===
Year	Title	Role	Notes
2016	Better Off Single	Sorority Girl	
2016	An Ideal Marriage	Julia	Short film
2019	1BR	Sarah	Video on demand
2019	Here on Out	Francis	
2020	A Small Family Affair	Jane Heller	Short film
TBA	Handle with Care†	Reese	filmed in 2024

=== Television ===
Year	Title	Role	Notes
2013	The Michael J. Fox Show	Amy	Episode: "Teammates"
2017	The Affair	Lila	Episode: "#3.6"
2019	Law & Order: Special Victims Unit	Chloe Cooper	Episode: "At Midnight in Manhattan"
2023, 2025	The Gilded Age	Maud Beaton	Recurring role (season 2), 2 episodes (season 3)
2024	We Were the Lucky Ones	Caroline	2 episodes
2025–present	Paradise	Agent Jane Driscoll	Main cast
