= Jorge Diaz (actor) =

American actor

Jorge Diaz is an American actor. He has had roles in the films Paranormal Activity: The Marked Ones and The 33, the drama miniseries The Long Road Home, and The Epic Tales of Captain Underpants.

== Career ==
Diaz had recurring roles in the television shows Days of Our Lives, Jane the Virgin and the Hulu drama East Los High, and has provided voice work for the animated shows Elena of Avalor, The Lion Guard, and Lost in Oz. His guest appearances include roles in Arrested Development and The Good Place.

== Background ==
He is of Mexican descent.

== Filmography ==
=== Film ===
Year	Title	Role	Notes
2007	2 Hitmen	Hector	Video
2009	Crush	Michael Lopez	
2011	American Trash	Brett D	
2011	Budz House	Ooley	
2012	Filly Brown	Eddie Vargas	
2012	Love, Concord	Gerry	
2014	Paranormal Activity: The Marked Ones	Hector Estrella	
2015	The 33	Igor Proestakis	
2016	Other People	Male Grocery Store Employee	
2018	Puppy Star Christmas	Julio	Voice
2018	Pup Star: World Tour	Julio	Voice
2021	Unknown Dimension: The Story of Paranormal Activity	Himself	Documentary film

=== Television ===
Year	Title	Role	Notes
2002–2003	Boston Public	Blake	2 episodes
2002–2003	The Brothers García	Arturo	2 episodes
2010	True Blood	Husband	
2011	The Secret Life of the American Teenager	Waiter	
2011	Iceland	Chris	Pilot
2012	Raising Hope	Randy	
2012	GCB	Paramedic	
2012	Oh Noah!	Noah, additional voices	Voice, 9 episodes
2013–2016	East Los High	Paulie	21 episodes
2015	Inbetween	Gregorio	4 episodes
2015	Days of Our Lives	Jorge	5 episodes
2015	Twelve Forever	Tristan	Voice, pilot
2015	Everstar	George	Voice, television film
2015–2017	Jane the Virgin	JD Guzman	5 episodes
2016	Hopeless, Romantic	Adam	Television film
2016	The Good Place	Antonio	2 episodes
2016	Code Black	Ken	
2016–2018	The Lion Guard	Mapigano, Nduli	Voice, 3 episodes
2016–2018	Lost In Oz	Ojo, Triplet #1, Huckster #2, Train Conductor, Pink Trooper Nome, Aqua Trooper Nome, Citizen, Guard #2, Sand Ghost Twin #1, Sand Ghost Twin #2, Hammerhead, Metro Announcer, Blue Trooper Nome #2	Voice, 26 episodes
2016–2020	Elena of Avalor	Gabe	Voice, 39 episodes
2017–2018	Runaways	Security Guard Earl	2 episodes
2017	The Long Road Home	SPC. Israel Garza	Miniseries; 8 episodes
2017	High & Mighty	Chelo	8 episodes
2018	Arrested Development	Worker Noah	2 episodes
2018	Big City Greens	Carlos	Voice, episode: "Swimming Fool"
2018	We Bare Bears	El Oso	Voice, episode: "El Oso"
2018–2020	The Epic Tales of Captain Underpants	Melvin Sneedly, Mr. Rected, Stanley Peet, Dr. Vil Endenemys, Ptolemy, Melvin's Dad	Voice, 37 episodes
2019–2021	Fast & Furious Spy Racers	Cisco Renaldo, Manny, Local Hunter	Voice, main role (52 episodes)
2020	Cleopatra in Space	Brian	Voice, 12 episodes
2020–2023	The Owl House	Matt Tholomule	Voice, 8 episodes
2021	Fairfax	Nine Inch Nips	Voice, episode: "Smells Like E-Spirit"
2021	Head of the Class	Elliot Escalante	Main role
2022–present	For All Mankind	Victor Diaz	11 episodes

=== Video games ===
Year	Title	Role	Notes
2013	Grand Theft Auto V	The Local Population	
2013	Dead Rising 3		Uncredited
2016	The Technomancer	Jeffrey Hunter, Additional voices	
2017	Tom Clancy's Ghost Recon Wildlands	DJ Perico	
2021	Fast & Furious Spy Racers: Rise of SH1FT3R	Cisco Renaldo	
