= Charlie Evans (actor) =

Australian actor

- Born: January 1, 2004 (age 22); Byron Bay, New South Wales, Australia
- Occupation: Actor
- Years active: 2020–present

Charlie Evans (born January 1, 2004) is an Australian actor and musician. He is known for his roles in the Netflix film Leave The World Behind (2023) and Hulu series Paradise (2025–present).

== Early life ==
Evans was born in Byron Bay to musician parents. At age six he began performing in various theatre groups. At age 10, his family moved to Los Angeles, where he further pursued the arts. Evans plays piano, bass guitar, and has trained as a classical and opera singer.

As of early 2026, Evans pursues music education through online classes at the Berklee College of Music.

== Career ==
Evans made his television debut in 2020, in the role of Leonard on the Freeform series Everything’s Gonna Be Okay.

He made his film debut as Archie Sandford in Leave The World Behind (2023) alongside Julia Roberts, Mahershala Ali and Ethan Hawke.

In 2025, Evans began starring as Jeremy Bradford, the son of the president (portrayed by James Marsden) in the Hulu thriller series Paradise (2025–present).

Evans also appears in the Amazon Prime Video series Off Campus (2026–present), as Hunter Davenport.

== Filmography ==
=== Film ===
| Year | Title | Role | Notes |
|---|---|---|---|
| 2023 | Leave The World Behind | Archie Sandford | |

=== Television ===
| Year | Title | Role | Notes |
|---|---|---|---|
| 2020–2021 | Everything's Gonna Be Okay | Leonard | Recurring role |
| 2025–present | Paradise | Jeremy Bradford | Main role |
| 2026–present | Off Campus | Hunter Davenport | Guest role |
