= Alan Blumenfeld =

American actor

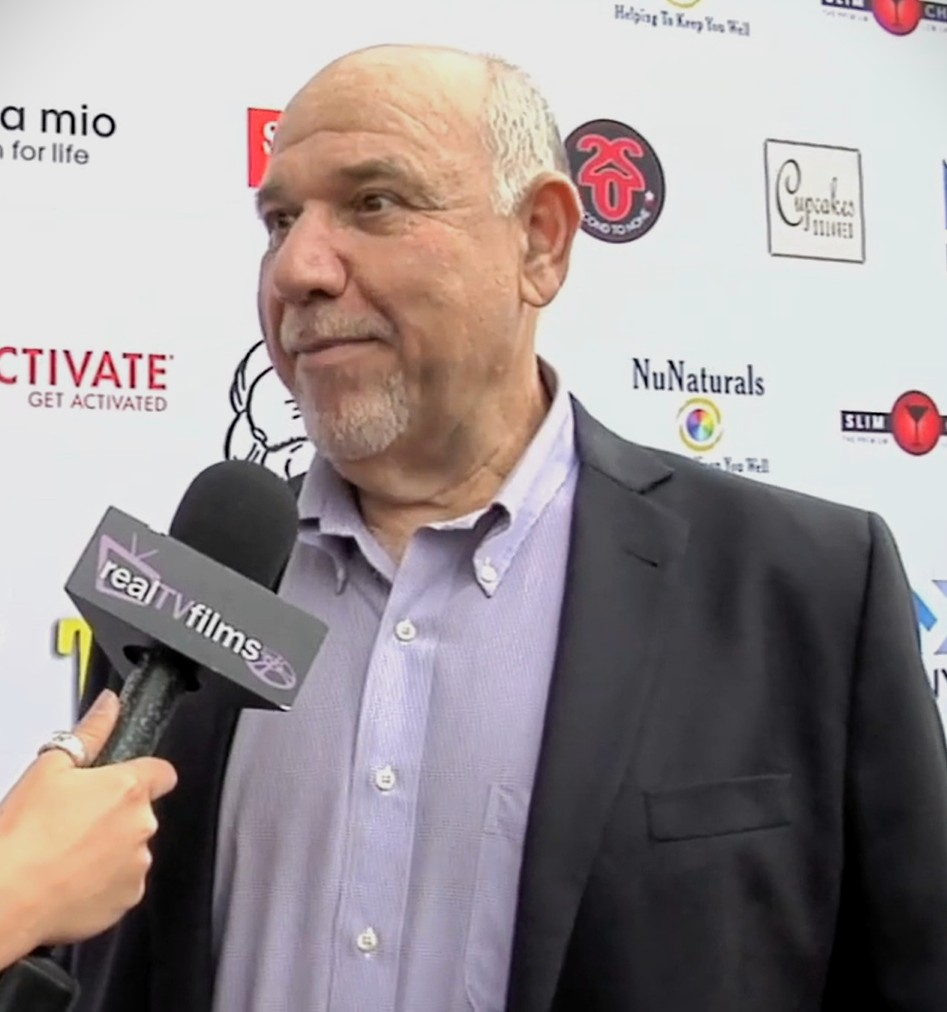
- Blumenfeld in 2013
- Born: September 4, 1952 (age 74); Rockville Centre, New York, U.S.
- Occupation: Actor
- Years active: 1983–present
- Website: alanblumenfeld.com

Alan Blumenfeld (born September 4, 1952) is an American character actor, best known for his role in NBC's TV series Heroes as Maury Parkman, the telepath father of Matt Parkman played by Greg Grunberg, and as Bob Buss in the telefilm 2gether. He has played Greg Grunberg's father in both Felicity and Heroes.

== Life and career ==
Blumenfeld has been acting since the age of 7 in his first grade, and has appeared in prime time television shows such as Grey's Anatomy, JAG, Gilmore Girls, CSI: Crime Scene Investigation, Without a Trace, and Judging Amy. He has also appeared in movies, including The Ring, In Her Shoes, and Friday the 13th Part VI: Jason Lives. He was also the voice of Glottis and Boyd Cooper on the cult video-games Grim Fandango and Psychonauts respectively.

Blumenfeld currently lives in Los Angeles and is still active in theater, film, voice and television acting. He also teaches acting at Pomona College in Claremont, CA.

== Filmography ==
=== Film ===
- 1983 WarGames as Mr. Liggett
- 1986 Friday the 13th Part VI: Jason Lives as Larry
- 1987 Tin Men as Stanley
- 1987 Innerspace as Man With Camera
- 1989 Out Cold as Lew
- 1989 K-9 as Rental Salesman
- 1989 Worth Winning as Frank
- 1989 Night Life as Howard Larimore
- 1990 Instant Karma as Oscar Meyer
- 1990 The Dark Side of the Moon as Dreyfuss Steiner
- 1991 Problem Child 2 as Aron Burger
- 1992 Blackbelt as Will Sturges
- 1993 Dragonstrike as King Halvor II
- 1994 Holy Matrimony as Married Man
- 1994 The Flintstones as Fred Look-A-Like
- 1995 Dillinger and Capone as Sal
- 1996 Jingle All the Way as Cop At Santa's Warehouse
- 1997 Dinner and Driving as Barry
- 1999 After Romeo
- 2001 Heartbreakers as Man In Gas Station
- 2002 The Ring as Harvey
- 2003 Deep Toad as The Trainer
- 2003 Dickie Roberts: Former Child Star as Mr. Rollins
- 2003 Nobody Knows Anything! as The Mayor
- 2005 In Her Shoes as Mr. Stein
- 2005 Callback as Joseph Wilt
- 2006 Curt's Brain as The Boss
- 2006 The TV Set as Dr. Schwartz
- 2006 The Elder Son as Mr. Kleeman
- 2007 Saints No Angels
- 2007 Box One Fory-Seven as The Bartender
- 2008 Pathology as Mr. Williamson
- 2008 Righteous Kill as Martin Baum
- 2008 How to Be a Hitman
- 2010 Anderson's Cross as George Green
- 2010 Confession as George
- 2011 Oliver's Ghost as Randall
- 2013 Hot Guys with Guns as Jimmy Peppicelli
- 2013 Crystal Lake Memories: The Complete History of Friday the 13th (Documentary film) as himself
- 2014 The Interview as Israeli Prime Minister (uncredited)
- 2014 How to Be a Hitman as Jimmy "Big Jimmy"
- 2019 1BR as Sarah's Father

=== Television ===
- 1983 Diff'rent Strokes as Mr. Gordon
- ‘’Family Ties’’, multiple characters
- 1985 Badge of the Assassin as Charlie
- 1988 Just in Time as Steven Birnbaum
- 1988 Frank Nitti: The Enforcer
- 1988 Shakedown on the Sunset Strip
- 1989 The Preppie Murder
- 1990 She'll Take Romance as Arthur Prinzmetal
- 1991 Payoff as Mother Goose
- 1991 Brooklyn Bridge
- 1992 In the Arms of a Killer
- 1993 Dying to Love You as Max
- 1993 Perry Mason: The Case of the Telltale Talk Show Host as Russell Farnsworth
- 1995 Ed McBain's 87th Precinct: Lightning as Detective Ollie Weeks
- 1995 The Barefoot Executive
- 1997 Murder One: Diary of a Serial Killer as Carl Runsdorf
- 1997 Breast Men as Michael
- 1999 Jackie's Back as Ivan (Theatre Manager)
- 2000 2gether as Bob Buss

=== Television guest appearances ===
- 1983 Diff'rent Strokes as Doug Gordon
- 1983-1984 Remington Steele as Bernard Geiger / Cameraman
- 1983-1985 Hill Street Blues as Officer Schwartzman / Driver / Maitre d'
- 1984 Cheers as Customer #1
- 1984-1987 Family Ties as George Bellack / Mr. Krewson / George / Mr. Gleason / Man At Garage Sale / Lou Stone
- 1985 Growing Pains as Walter (2 episodes)
- 1985 Moonlighting as Charles
- 1985 Hunter as "Ziggie", Police Mechanic
- 1986 Fame as Charlie
- 1986 The Twilight Zone as Edwin Dewett (segment "The Library")
- 1986 The Facts of Life as Mr. Simmons
- 1986-1987 The Golden Girls as Mr. Ha Ha / Lou
- 1987 Valerie as Coach Bracco
- 1987-1989 Matlock as Steven Gabriel / Harry Craven
- 1989-1993 L.A. Law as Ed Hicks / Dr. Robert Ingram
- 1988 Day by Day as Joe Miltman
- 1989 Roseanne as Zack
- 1989 Free Spirit as Ted Crenshaw
- 1990 The Marshall Chronicles as Ray Weinstein
- 1990-1992 Life Goes On as John Katchadorian
- 1991 Beverly Hills, 90210 as Jake
- 1992 Room for Two as Merle Filbert
- 1993 Flying Blind as Dr. Rossman
- 1993 Hangin' with Mr. Cooper as Wally, Earvin's Father
- 1994 Law & Order as Defense Attorney Novello
- 1994 The Commish as Lenny Fletcher
- 1994 Monty as Jerry
- 1995 Step by Step as Tom Flynn
- 1995 Bless This House as Louie
- 1996 Hudson Street as Hamlisch
- 1996 Life with Roger as Paulie Costello
- 1996 Murphy Brown as Eddie
- 1997 Dave's World as Al
- 1997 Diagnosis Murder as Sid Gordon
- 1997 Murder One as Carl Runsdorf
- 1997 NYPD Blue as Paul Angelos
- 1997-1998 The Practice as Attorney For Carnival Owner / Attorney for Mrs. Kramer
- 1998 ER as Rob Savage
- 1998 Chicago Hope as Herb Parker
- 1999 Vengeance Unlimited as Anthony Martinelli
- 1999 Pacific Blue as Phil Cross
- 1999 Any Day Now
- 2000 Walker, Texas Ranger as Artie Stanton
- 2001 That's Life
- 2001 Becker as Vinny DeLuca
- 2001 Sabrina Teenage Witch as Marvin "Marv"
- 2001 Felicity as Manny Blumberg
- 2001-2002 Philly as Judge Paul DaCosta
- 2001-2004 The Division as Prison Guard Representative / Ed Reynolds
- 2002 The Agency
- 2002 Special Unit 2 as Dr. Marcus
- 2002 Judging Amy as Mr. Fisher
- 2002-2006 Gilmore Girls as Rabbi David Barans
- 2003 Without a Trace as Dr. Kreutzer
- 2003-2010 CSI: Crime Scene Investigation as Bernard Higgins / Alan Sobel, Comedy Club Owner
- 2004 Curb Your Enthusiasm as Joe Figg (uncredited)
- 2004 Century City as Duke La Pointe
- 2004 JAG as Josh Flanzer
- 2006 Grey's Anatomy as Shawn Sullivan
- 2006-2007 Smith as Don Gardner
- 2007 Pandemic (TV Movie) as Bill Smith
- 2007 Jane Doe: Ties That Bind (TV Movie) as Bannister
- 2007 While the Children Sleep (TV Movie) as Del Olson
- 2007 Dirty Sexy Money as Judge
- 2007-2008 Heroes as Maury Parkman
- 2008 Mad Men as George Rothman
- 2008 Stargate Atlantis as Dimas
- 2009 Numbers as Store Owner
- 2010 Cold Case as Wilson Katz '10
- 2011 The Mentalist as Nathan Vella
- 2011 Zeke and Luther as Mr. Smorlov
- 2026 Scrubs as Arthur

=== Video games ===
- 1998 Grim Fandango as Glottis
- 2001 Jak and Daxter: The Precursor Legacy as Willard
- 2003 Jak II as Brutter / Mog / Grim
- 2005 Psychonauts as Boyd Cooper / Second Peasant
- 2006 Daxter as Brutter
- 2006 SpyHunter: Nowhere to Run as IES Soldiers / Kryo / Nostra Scientist
- 2012 The Darkness II as Additional Voices
- 2015 Fallout 4 as Skinny Malone / Clarence Codman / Evan Watson
