= David Bloom =

American journalist (1963–2003)

- Born: David Jerome Bloom; May 22, 1963; Edina, Minnesota, U.S.
- Died: April 6, 2003 (aged 39); Iraq
- Cause of death: Pulmonary embolism from deep vein thrombosis
- Education: Pitzer College
- Occupation: Television journalist
- Years active: 1988–2003
- Spouse: Melanie Bloom
- Children: 3, including Nicole

David Jerome Bloom (May 22, 1963 – April 6, 2003) was an American television journalist (co-anchor of Weekend Today and reporter) until his sudden death in 2003 after a deep vein thrombosis (DVT) became a pulmonary embolism at the age of 39.

== Early life ==
David Bloom was born in Edina, Minnesota, the son of Laura Jean (née Carmichael) and Harold James Bloom. He was an avid ice hockey player and state champion in high school debating in the National Forensic League. Bloom attended Pitzer College in Claremont, California, from 1981 to 1985, where he majored in political science.

In 1985, Bloom was ranked top in the nation for intercollegiate policy debate. He and his partner, Greg Mastel, were ranked the top debate team in the nation before entering the National Debate Tournament of 1985. They lost in quarter-finals to Loyola Marymount.

== Professional career ==
He began his television career at WKBT-TV in La Crosse, Wisconsin, covering local government stories. Bloom worked as a general assignment reporter at KWCH-TV in Wichita, Kansas from 1988 to 1989.

In 1989, Bloom joined NBC's WTVJ in Miami. He covered Hurricane Andrew and while reporting the aftermath he chased off would-be looters. In 1991, he won a regional Emmy for investigative journalism for his report on South Florida's role in the shipment of arms to Iraq. He received the Peabody Award and was awarded the Edward R. Murrow Award by the Radio-Television News Directors Association for his hurricane coverage.

In 1993, Bloom joined NBC News as correspondent in Chicago, Illinois, and moved to Los Angeles, California in 1995. Bloom covered the presidential campaigns of 1996 and 2000 for the network and in 1997 became NBC's White House correspondent. Former President Clinton said that Bloom's "integrity and good humor will be missed."

During his tenure with NBC, Bloom reported on major stories including presidential races, the September 11 attacks, the Washington-area sniper shootings, and the war in Bosnia. According to the late Tim Russert, former NBC Washington bureau chief, "You couldn't keep him away from a story. Whenever something was breaking, he wanted to be there." In March 2000, Bloom became co-anchor of Weekend Today along with Soledad O'Brien, a position in which he served until his death.

== Iraq reporting and death ==
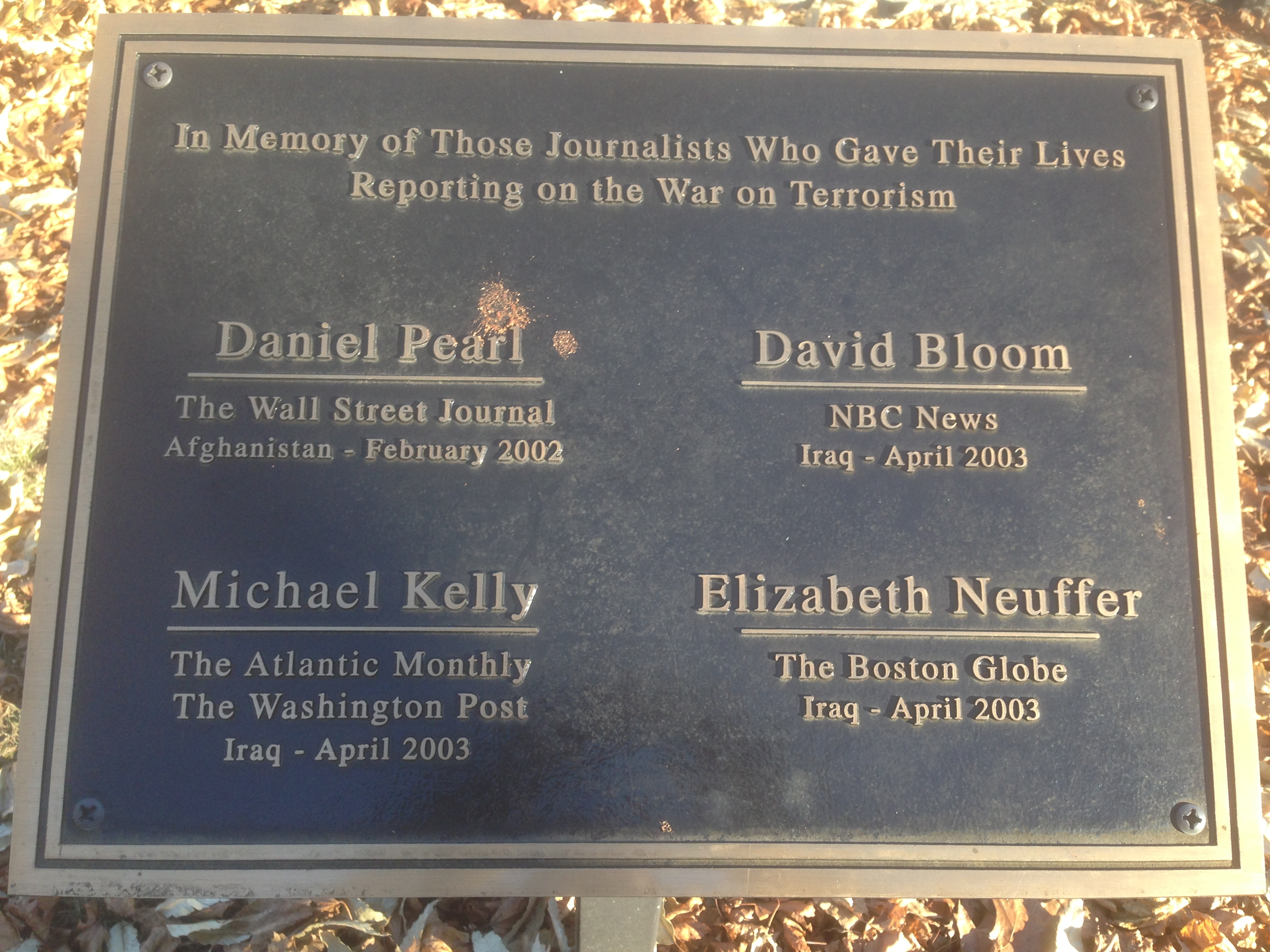
Plaque at National War Correspondents Memorial, Gathland State Park

On April 6, 2003, Bloom was traveling with the U.S. Third Infantry Division in Iraq while covering the Iraq War in a vehicle pegged after his name, the "Bloom Mobile." It was a Ford F250 4 wheel drive Flatbed truck retrofitted with live television and satellite transmission equipment so he could continuously broadcast reports as troops made their way toward Baghdad. Reporting live, round-the-clock, as the American armored column fought north across the desert toward Baghdad, Bloom commented offhandedly on the cramped conditions, excessive heat and lack of sleep that came with the mission.

He had been on assignment in Iraq for several weeks when a blood clot in his leg (deep vein thrombosis) traveled to an artery in his lungs, causing a fatal pulmonary embolism. "The clot in Bloom's leg was likely brought on by spending long days and nights cramped inside armored vehicles. One night he called Melanie from a satellite phone in the middle of the night, exposing himself to hostile fire just to get a few minutes outside of an armored tank because his legs had been cramping up."

== Personal life ==
Bloom was survived by his wife, Melanie, and three daughters: Nicole, an actress, Christine, and Ava. The Blooms were residents of Pound Ridge, New York at the time of his death. After his death, his widow began working with the Coalition to Prevent DVT and married Daniel McNulty in 2008.

== The David Bloom Award ==
In 2006 The National Association of Radio and Television Broadcasters established an award to honor excellence in enterprise reporting. ABC World News Tonight co-anchor Bob Woodruff received the award in its first year.
