= Paradise (2025 TV series) =

American television series

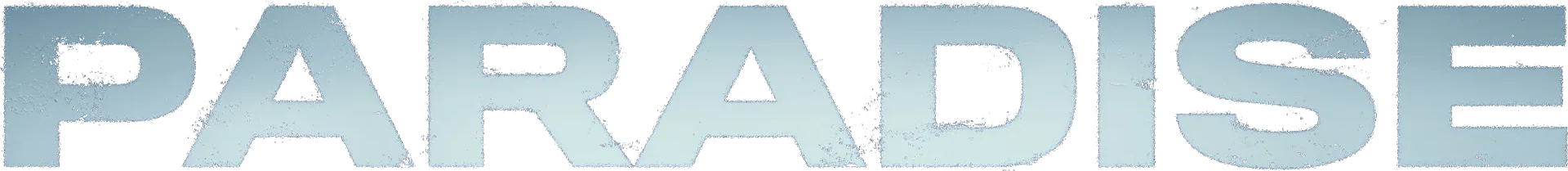
- Genre: Political thriller; Post-apocalyptic; Science fiction
- Created by: Dan Fogelman
- Showrunner: Dan Fogelman
- Starring: Sterling K. Brown; Julianne Nicholson; Sarah Shahi; Nicole Brydon Bloom; Aliyah Mastin; Percy Daggs IV; James Marsden; Krys Marshall; Enuka Okuma; Charlie Evans
- Music by: Siddhartha Khosla
- Country of origin: United States
- Original language: English
- No. of seasons: 2
- No. of episodes: 16

Production
- Executive producers: Sterling K. Brown; Dan Fogelman; John Requa; Glenn Ficarra; Jess Rosenthal; John Hoberg; Steve Beers
- Producers: Chris Nguyen-Gia; Randol Perelman-Taylor
- Running time: 45–59 minutes
- Production companies: Rhode Island Ave. Productions; 20th Television

Original release
- Network: Hulu
- Release: January 26, 2025 – present

Paradise is an American post-apocalyptic political thriller television series created by Dan Fogelman and starring Sterling K. Brown, Julianne Nicholson, and James Marsden. It was released on Hulu in the United States on January 26, 2025. The series has received generally positive reviews from critics, with praise for its premise, writing, and performances (particularly those of Brown, Nicholson, Marsden and Shailene Woodley). The series has been nominated for eleven Primetime Emmy Awards, including two nominations for Outstanding Drama Series and acting nominations for Brown, Nicholson, Marsden and Woodley.

In February 2025, the series was renewed for a second season, which premiered on February 23, 2026. In March 2026, the series was renewed for a third and final season.

== Premise ==
The series is set in a city-sized underground bunker in Colorado three years after a doomsday event. It follows United States Secret Service agent Xavier Collins as he seeks to discover the truth behind the killing of the president of the United States. Xavier comes under suspicion for President Bradford's death, so he searches for answers about what really happened―though he is unsure whom he can trust, as his questions lead to many shocking revelations.

== Cast ==
=== Main ===
- Sterling K. Brown as Xavier Collins, the lead special agent on the president's Secret Service security detail
- Julianne Nicholson as Samantha "Sinatra" Redmond, a rich self-made woman and the chief decision maker in the bunker
- Sarah Shahi as Gabriela Torabi, a psychotherapist and grief specialist
- Nicole Brydon Bloom as Jane Driscoll, a special agent who is a member of the president's Secret Service detail
- Aliyah Mastin as Presley Collins, Xavier's teenage daughter
- Percy Daggs IV as James Collins, Xavier's 10-year-old son
- James Marsden as Cal Bradford (season 1, recurring season 2), the president of the United States, Secret Service code name "Wildcat", found murdered in the series premiere and seen alive only in flashbacks
- Krys Marshall as Nicole Robinson (season 2, recurring season 1), a Secret Service SAIC who was having an affair with President Bradford
- Enuka Okuma as Teri Rogers-Collins (season 2, recurring season 1), a mycologist and Xavier's wife
- Charlie Evans as Jeremy Bradford (season 2, recurring season 1), the president's teenage son

=== Recurring ===
- Jon Beavers as Billy Pace, a special agent who is a member of the president's Secret Service detail and a former mercenary
- Kate Godfrey as Hadley Redmond, Samantha "Sinatra" Redmond's daughter
- Tuc Watkins as Tim Redmond (seasons 1–2), Sinatra's husband and Hadley's father
- Cassidy Freeman as Jessica Bradford (season 1), the first lady of the United States and Cal's estranged wife
- Gerald McRaney as Kane Bradford (season 1, guest season 2), Cal's dementia-afflicted father and a former oil baron
- Richard Robichaux as Carl (season 1), a neighbor of Collins who works in the dome light control station
- Matt Malloy as Henry Baines (seasons 1–2), the vice president of the United States and Bradford's designated successor
- Ian Merrigan as Trent (season 1), a former project manager who adopts the identity of Eli Davis, the Liberty Grove librarian
- Michelle Meredith as a woman who adopts the identity of Maggie Davis (season 1), the lead waitress at the Liberty Grove diner
- Shailene Woodley as Annie Clay (season 2), a survivor and former medical student
- Thomas Doherty as Link (season 2), a survivor and part of Geiger's group searching for the bunker
- Michael McGrady as Geiger (season 2), the leader of a survivor group searching for the bunker
- Cameron Britton as Gary Jones (season 2), a survivor and former mailman
- Julianna Margulies (season 3)

=== Guest ===
- Patrick Fischler as Henry Miller (season 2), a quantum scientist and former owner of Vestige Quantum
- Simon Templeman as Dr Chase (season 2), a scientist working for "Sinatra"

== Episodes ==
=== Series overview ===
Season	Episodes	Originally released	
Season	Episodes	First released	Last released
1	8	January 26, 2025	March 4, 2025
2	8	February 23, 2026	March 30, 2026

=== Season 1 (2025) ===
No. overall	No. in season	Title	Directed by	Written by	Original release date
1	1	"Wildcat Is Down"	Glenn Ficarra & John Requa	Dan Fogelman	January 26, 2025
Agent Xavier Collins, a United States Secret Service agent, discovers the body of President Cal Bradford in the presidential residence. Collins examines the premises and realizes that the president's safe has been raided, and that security footage froze for a few hours after his last contact with Bradford. Collins asks Agent Billy Pace and Agent Jane Driscoll, who are in a relationship, to secure the residence and inform others. Collins suspects Agent Nicole Robinson, who was sleeping with Bradford. In the past, President Bradford personally recruits Agent Collins to be his lead Secret Service agent after Collins saved Bradford by taking a bullet on his behalf. Bradford informs Collins of a top-secret project being built inside the mountains in Colorado in preparation for an extinction-level event. The night before Bradford's death, Collins is resentful towards Bradford for an unapparent reason and tells him that he will forgive Bradford and sleep peacefully when Bradford is dead. A digital signboard indicates that dawn is delayed by two hours due to scheduled maintenance, and it is revealed that the entire commune exists in a domed bunker inside a mountain with a large, powerful light source supplying artificial sunlight.
2	2	"Sinatra"	Glenn Ficarra & John Requa	Dan Fogelman & Katie French	January 28, 2025
In the past, then-Senator Bradford meets with billionaire Samantha Redmond at an almost-empty conference where a speaker warns that the world will end due to natural causes. Later, Redmond brings a team to a secret excavation inside a mountain and asks them to build her a city. In the present, Collins dreams of a memory where he speaks to his wife over a satellite phone before the white flash of an explosion blinds him. Collins is taken for questioning by Agent Robinson, who claims to have a strong alibi. Under interrogation using lie detector equipment, Collins openly shares that Robinson was sleeping with the president. Dr. Torabi, the bunker's mental health expert, interrupts them and asks Collins if a part of him is happy that Bradford is dead, and prompts him to answer "yes" with a hidden note on her hand. The public is called to the town hall, where Bradford's death is announced and Vice President Baines is sworn in as his successor. Collins tells Pace that he is suspicious of Redmond (nicknamed Sinatra), and he plans to bring her down.
3	3	"The Architect of Social Well-Being"	Gandja Monteiro	Jason Wilborn	January 28, 2025
A pathologist informs Redmond and Robinson that Bradford was killed using a blunt object, but DNA results will arrive later. Robinson traces the camera blackouts using digital footprints. Pace and Driscoll are worried about being caught in the presidential residence, disappointing Robinson when she finds out they had only been in the presidential residence to play on his entertainment systems while he slept. Collins demands Dr. Torabi to tell him why she interfered with his interrogation, to which she tells him that Bradford seemed disturbed before his death. Dr. Torabi asks Collins to tell her about his father, to which Collins reveals that he filed for his father's retirement from being a commercial pilot due to the onset of Parkinson's disease, which was against his father's wishes. Dr. Torabi shares that she specially selected Collins, and they begin a tryst. When they get in the shower together, Dr. Torabi whispers to Collins that Bradford believed Pace to be dangerous. Pace waits outside Collins' residence with a revolver.
4	4	"Agent Billy Pace"	Gandja Monteiro	Scott Weinger	February 4, 2025
In the past, Pace experienced an abusive upbringing under his uncle, who he killed to save his dog. After surviving in juvenile detention, Pace becomes a ruthless mercenary. In the bunker, Pace embraces the new normal, seeing it as a second chance. Pace forms a bond with Collins, who introduces him to his daughter Presley and son James. Three months in, Pace suggests to Bradford that people need closure about the world outside. A surface expedition is conducted by some scientists, but they do not return. Under Redmond's orders, Pace eliminates the scientists, although the scientists reveal that the air is breathable and the surface is still habitable. In the present, Collins begins to doubt Pace. When confronted, Pace denies involvement in Bradford's death but is hurt by Collins' suspicion. Pace confronts Redmond, demanding she leave Collins and his family alone. Redmond dismisses him, reminding him that a barely habitable world is meaningless, and he only exists to serve as her enforcer. Pace enjoys time with Collins' family, telling Collins he will tell him the whole truth in the morning. At their house, Driscoll poisons Pace so that Redmond can silence him.
5	5	"In the Palaces of Crowned Kings"	Hanelle Culpepper	Stephen Markley	February 11, 2025
Washington, D.C., is submerged under 500 feet (150 m) of ocean. (Note: Only the 55-foot (17 m) pyramidion of the Washington Monument is shown protruding from the ocean; later, the USS Gerald R. Ford, damaged and lifeless, is shown nearby.) In 1997, Bradford tells his father that he wanted to be a teacher, but his father forces him into politics. Later, in the bunker, Bradford accesses files on his tablet describing a potential supervolcanic eruption caused by deglaciation in Antarctica and its social effects, including a nuclear exchange, but finds he can not access files related to the surface expedition. Bradford uses his sleeping father's handprint to gain access, learning that Pace was ordered to kill the scientists; he confronts Redmond, who warns him to keep it secret. On what would be his final night, Bradford suddenly makes a CD of music files for his son Jeremy, and he tells Robinson where to access a stockpile of guns, which are outlawed in the settlement. Later, Bradford talks with his father about a bookmark used as a secret signal with his (since deceased) mother. In the present, Jeremy despises his father for only allowing billionaires to enter the bunker, but he speaks kindly at his father's Presidential funeral. Collins suspects that a camera is being installed in his street lamp, finding out from Robinson that the DNA samples from the crime scene disappeared, so she suspects Redmond. After the funeral, Collins and Driscoll find Pace dead in his house and Driscoll feigns grief. Robinson tells Collins about the guns, and they plan to take Redmond down. Bradford's father, suffering from dementia, believes Jeremy is Cal and apologizes for how he treated him. Collins tells his daughter Presley about Pace's death and asks her to prepare to escape with her brother James, but Presley is seen looking at the President's tablet, hidden under her mattress. On Collins' instruction, the message "They're lying to you" appears on the nighttime dome.
6	6	"You Asked for Miracles"	Hanelle Culpepper	Gina Lucita Monreal	February 18, 2025
Before going to the bunker, Collins acts as the President's security detail. Bradford refuses to divulge details about the incoming disaster, but he promises to pick up Collins' wife. In the present, Dr. Torabi meets with Collins while Robinson raids the lethal weapons cache. In the control station of the bunker, Redmond tries to track Collins and his children, but their mandatory tracking wristbands are offline, so she dispatches Driscoll to find the children. The message on the dome changes to "Do you want to know the truth?". Jeremy helps Presley by asking his grandfather to unlock the tablet, where they discover the secrets and decide to tell the public. Collins and Robinson assemble a team of rebels against the leadership, starting a countdown on the dome, and shooting decoy flares at the control station's window. Redmond calls for a reboot of the dome lighting, plunging the settlement into darkness and allowing the billionaire board members to head to a bunker. However, the bunker gets ambushed by Robinson's team. Dr. Torabi redirects Redmond and herself to a house, where Collins finds them. When he confronts Redmond, she admits to killing Pace and offers Collins a chance to find his wife, who is still alive.
7	7	"The Day"	Glenn Ficarra & John Requa	John Hoberg	February 25, 2025
On the day of the Antarctic supervolcanic eruption, thousands of cubic miles of ice melt instantly, causing a world-encircling megatsunami. The US government is caught unprepared, as scientific analysis had predicted weeks of warning, rather than minutes, and the White House begins its evacuation plan. When Collins learns that his wife Teri is stranded in Atlanta, he tries to secure a seat for her on a military flight, inadvertently alerting unauthorized White House staff that his family will be saved while theirs will not. A guilt-ridden Bradford decides to give a live address to America, so people can decide how to spend their final moments. Realizing that this will spark desperate violence from abandoned White House staff, Collins and Robinson lead the agents hurriedly evacuating Bradford, shooting several staff. Arriving at Air Force One, Collins blames Bradford for keeping the impending disaster a secret and for leaving Teri no hope of evacuation. Bradford tells Collins to get onto the plane to be there for his children, who were safely evacuated. Planes carrying the Supreme Court, Congress and Joint Chiefs of Staff crash before reaching the bunker. Russia and China launch all of their nuclear weapons to claim what is left of Earth's resources. Airborne to Colorado, Bradford provides Collins with a satellite phone so he can say goodbye to Teri. Bradford activates a secret EMP network installed after the Cuban Missile Crisis to deactivate all nuclear weapons and allow people to survive, at the cost of taking out the world's electronics, which Redmond disagrees with. In the present, Redmond reveals to Collins that Atlanta was not destroyed by missiles, but also that the DNA samples from Bradford's murder implicate a perpetrator from outside the bunker. Redmond demands that Collins surrender and capture the murderer if he wants to see Presley and Teri again, after playing a recording of Teri sending a message to her family.
8	8	"The Man Who Kept the Secrets"	Glenn Ficarra & John Requa	Nadra Widatalla	March 4, 2025
Collins, Robinson and their team surrender and return the weapons. Driscoll assures Redmond that Presley will stay quiet, but is not rewarded for her loyalty. Robinson and Dr. Torabi examine the arrival list and confront a waitress, "Maggie", who confesses that she was forced to sneak into the bunker. Collins finds notes hidden by Bradford in library books, but librarian Trent knocks him unconscious and steals the notes. During the bunker's construction, Trent was fired for protesting against the workers contracting arsenopyrite poisoning. Aware of the predicted imminent destruction, Trent attempted to assassinate Bradford at a press conference, but missed and shot Collins instead. After escaping prison on the day of the disaster, Trent and the waitress stole the identities of a librarian, Eli and his wife, Maggie. Despite initially living comfortably in the bunker, Trent's hatred of Bradford resurfaced upon meeting him. Trent snuck in Bradford's bedroom, killing him with a construction tool on display at the library. Trent commits suicide in front of Collins and Robinson by jumping off the skylight's maintenance station. Collins confronts Redmond, but Driscoll arrives and shoots her non-lethally. Presley and Robinson encourage Collins to find Teri and other survivors using Bradford's notes, leading Collins to pilot an aircraft out of the bunker.

=== Season 2 (2026) ===
No. overall	No. in season	Title	Directed by	Written by	Original release date
9	1	"Graceland"	Glenn Ficarra & John Requa	Dan Fogelman & Eric Wen	February 23, 2026
Annie Clay, an orphaned medical school dropout, becomes a guide at Graceland. After the disaster, volcanic ash plunges the world into darkness and freezing temperatures and the EMP disables electric devices. Annie and her injured colleague Gayle take refuge in Graceland, but Gayle dies after 45 days. Nearly 23 months after the disaster, sunlight returns, and a group of survivors led by Geiger enter Graceland. They give Annie fresh food, scavenge car parts and explain they are shutting down nuclear power plants across the country. The group theorizes a bunker exists in Colorado, where they plan to kill a figure dubbed "Alex" and use the exclusive resources to try and re-start civilization. Annie becomes close with a survivor, Link. They sleep together, but she refuses to travel with the group to the bunker. Months later, Annie is pregnant and Link has not returned, despite vowing to. When a plane crashes nearby in a danger zone in Arkansas across the river, she travels there on horseback and discovers an unconscious Collins.
10	2	"Mayday"	Glenn Ficarra & John Requa	Jason Wilborn	February 23, 2026
In 2004, Collins injures his knee at the Secret Service Training Academy and meets Teri in hospital as he recovers from surgery. They grow closer as he cares for her during recovery from perioperative vision loss after scoliosis surgery, and the two confirm their love when Teri regains her sight. In the present, Collins crashes his plane during a violent hailstorm and dislocates his patella. He is rescued by a group of survival-hardened children, led by Daniel, whose parents died in the disaster. Daniel confirms they are in Arkansas, not Georgia. Collins puts his kneecap back in place but is attacked by a predatory adult survivor who was following the children. Collins kills the man, but he is stabbed during the fight and falls unconscious. The children abandon Collins and steal his belongings and notes, minus a photo of Presley and James, after dressing his wound. Collins passes out again and is taken in by Annie. Upon discovering he is from the bunker, she holds him at gunpoint and demands he take her to Colorado.
11	3	"Another Day in Paradise"	Ken Olin	Scott Weinger	February 23, 2026
Before the disaster, Redmond is told Earth will experience uninhabitable temperature and pressure after the eruption due to build-up of greenhouse gases. She starts a secret side-project to counteract this, and hires Pace to force quantum scientist Henry Miller to sell his company to her. Miller euthanises his sick wife, and urges Pace to spare his protégé, revealed to be Link, before being killed. Pace obliges and Redmond hires him. In the present, President Baines has assumed control of the bunker, arresting dissidents including Jeremy and Anders, the bunker's architect. He discovers a large amount of power is reserved for Redmond's second project. Redmond wakes up from her coma and Driscoll informs Redmond she told everyone Collins was her shooter. Redmond is placed under house arrest and Torabi bugs her house. After being demoted, Robinson suspects Driscoll killed Pace. Having been given a code phrase by Redmond to assassinate Baines, Driscoll does so while she and Baines are jogging, framing Robinson and the rebels. In a prison deep under the bunker, Jeremy asks Anders to help destroy the bunker's doors.
12	4	"A Holy Charge"	Ken Olin	Stephen Markley	March 2, 2026
Three years prior, Redmond offers to help with the first baby born in the bunker. She tells him in secret that one day he will live outside again. Geiger's group joins a large convoy and arrives outside the bunker. Annie treats Xavier's wounds and they bond as he recovers. After a heartfelt discussion about parenthood, which Xavier describes as a "holy charge", they agree to first find Teri in Atlanta and then go to Colorado. Xavier inexplicably recognizes Link's photo on his Caltech student ID card Annie kept and tells her he has been having strange dreams. Annie, suffering from pre-eclampsia, goes into premature labor. Xavier goes to a nearby farm to get help, and despite Annie's pessimism and distrust of others, several survivors help her give birth to a baby girl. Annie urges Xavier to take her unnamed daughter to Link in Colorado. She gives him a letter she wrote for her daughter and urges him to remind her not to be scared of people, then dies of severe postpartum bleeding. Xavier and the baby travel to the disused post office in Atlanta where Teri messaged from. On arrival, they are met by Gary, who says Teri has been taken from him.
13	5	"The Mailman"	Liza Johnson	Katie French	March 9, 2026
Five years prior, mailman Gary Jones discovers his post office has a fallout shelter from the Cold War. After reading conspiracy theories, he joins a group of online survivalists with his friend Ennis and plans for the worst. On the day, he and Ennis rescue a neglected boy, Bean, and encounter Teri as the EMP activates. They take shelter with the rest of Gary's group. Teri and Gary grow close and try to keep spirits up, but Ennis becomes controlling. Gary builds a transmitter for Teri to broadcast, but Ennis later destroys it. Teri synthesises biofuel, planning to drive to Colorado with Bean. A large group arrives by freight train, telling Ennis and Gary they are going to Colorado to restart the world. Having fallen in love with Teri, Gary kills Ennis to stop him telling her, not wanting to lose her or Bean. In the present, Gary lies to Xavier, saying the group is hostile and took Teri and the others by force after Ennis betrayed them. Xavier plans to rescue her, and builds an IED with the help from Gary's friends, Crystal and Jack.
14	6	"Jane"	Liza Johnson	Nadra Widatalla	March 16, 2026
In 1997, a man is sent several messages warning "a killer will be born" at a precise time and date. The baby is Driscoll, and he confronts her single mother about this. Driscoll struggles with mental health issues and abuse in childhood. After joining the CIA, she overcomes many issues during training at The Farm, but later mutilates an instructor who was promoted over her mentor Stacy. In the present, Robinson is detained and Redmond resumes control. Torabi discovers the importance of "Alex" to Redmond, and is told by Robinson that Driscoll is dangerous. Redmond sends Driscoll to negotiate meeting terms with Link's growing militia, later giving her praise and validation that she relishes. Driscoll warns Torabi against intervening. Anders tells Jeremy the bunker doors will open if the oxygen supply is cut, and they escape from prison with Robinson. Meanwhile, Gary sabotages Collins by detonating the IED early, but he narrowly dodges the explosion. Teri, revealed to have joined the train group voluntarily, rushes out and sees him.
15	7	"The Final Countdown"	Hanelle M. Culpepper	Melissa Glenn	March 23, 2026
Collins and Teri reunite and negotiate a return to the bunker with the train group. Teri convinces Gary to give up Bean peacefully. Torabi confronts Redmond about "Alex", but is dismissed. Redmond meets with Link, where he reveals the group's intent to take "Alex". As Link leaves the bunker, Redmond mistakenly reveals "Alex" is not a person, and discovers Link shares the same name and birthday as her deceased son, Dylan. The two experience nosebleeds, as does Collins on the train. Presley and Redmond's daughter Hadley become trapped while trying to rescue Robinson and Jeremy. Anders, Jeremy and Robinson sabotage the oxygen supply to force open the bunker doors. At the same time, the advisory council initiates a full lockdown, creating a command conflict that overloads the system and pushes the bunker’s reactors towards nuclear meltdown. Torabi kills Driscoll when the latter tries to assassinate her. Redmond takes a subterranean transport to a secret facility, seen in Collins' and Link's visions, and greets "Alex".
16	8	"Exodus"	Hanelle M. Culpepper	John Hoberg & Seena Haddad	March 30, 2026
Before the disaster, Link presents Miller with a briefcase-sized AI quantum supercomputer he has built, and Redmond funds its further development. However, the AI, named after Miller's wife Alex, begins to manipulate time itself and Miller urges Redmond to end the project. In the present, Redmond is at Alex's bunker, 100 miles from Paradise; it has started to make correct predictions about events, with the next prediction being her death. With Redmond gone and the militia approaching, Torabi orders the doors to be opened to stabilize the reactors. The cooling systems explode, killing Anders, and Torabi is forced to order the bunker's complete evacuation. The militia enters, and Collins and Teri reunite with James. Link helps Redmond and Collins in rescuing their daughters, Geiger dies trying to fix the cooling system, and the militia rescues Robinson and Jeremy. Link and Collins experience time hallucinations and nosebleeds in each other's presence, and Collins persuades Link to temporarily stop pursuing Alex after revealing the existence of his and Annie's daughter. Redmond, understanding Alex's time manipulation, tells Link that he is her son Dylan. During the evacuation, Driscoll is no longer seen lying in Torabi's shower. Having been told by Alex to send Collins, she tells Collins to find Alex at the distant bunker – underneath Denver Airport – as time manipulation implies he will "already have" saved the world. Redmond sacrifices herself to lock the bunker's doors, containing the reactors' nuclear explosions inside. Collins escapes and reunites with his family, while Link meets his baby daughter, who he names Annie.

== Production ==
In April 2023, it was reported that Hulu had commissioned the series by 20th Television written by Dan Fogelman who is also executive producer via Rhode Island Ave. Productions, along with Jess Rosenthal. Sterling K. Brown and John Hoberg are also executive producers. Brown was also expected to star in the series.

In February 2024, James Marsden was cast as the president, with Julianne Nicholson and Sarah Shahi also joining the cast. In November 2024, Nicole Brydon Bloom, Aliyah Mastin and Percy Daggs IV joined the cast. In February 2025, Hulu renewed the series for a second season. In March 2025, Shailene Woodley joined the second season in a recurring role. In April 2025, Thomas Doherty, Michael McGrady, and Timothy Omundson were added to the cast of the second season as recurring guest stars. In June 2025, Ryan Michelle Bathe joined the second season in a guest capacity. In October 2025, Patrick Fischler joined the cast in a recurring capacity for the second season. In April 2026, Julianna Margulies joined the cast in a recurring capacity for the third season.

Filming began under the title Paradise City in Los Angeles in February 2024. Production on the second season began in March 2025.

In March 2026, Hulu renewed the series for a third and final season, which concluded filming on August 14, 2026.

== Release ==
Promotional poster

Paradise premiered on Hulu early on January 26, 2025. The series was originally set to premiere with the first three episodes on January 28, 2025. Internationally, the series was released on Disney+. ABC aired the first season starting April 7, 2025.

In December 2025, it was announced the second season would premiere with the release of its first 3 episodes on February 23, 2026, with subsequent episodes planned to be released weekly.

== Reception ==
=== Viewership ===
The premiere of Paradise drew 1.4 million viewers in a special 10:09 p.m. broadcast on ABC on January 29, according to Nielsen's Live + 5 Day ratings. Its cable debut on FX on February 1 at 10 p.m. attracted 250,000 viewers per Live + 2 Day data. Hulu reported that the show's TikTok account received the most views and shares among first-season scripted Hulu shows in the past twelve months. The Walt Disney Company announced that the premiere episode of Paradise garnered seven million views globally within its first nine days of streaming. Luminate, which measures streaming performance in the U.S. by analyzing viewership data, audience engagement metrics, and content reach across various platforms, calculated that Paradise was the ninth most-streamed show from Q1 2025, with 3.9 billion minutes of watch time.

Paradise debuted on Hulu's "Top 15 Today"—a daily updated list of the platform's most-watched titles—on its release day and remained on the list for its entire first week. JustWatch, a guide to streaming content with access to data from more than 45 million active users across more than 4,500 services worldwide, reported that the show was the top streaming series in the U.S. from January 27 to February 2. It was also the top-ranked show in Canada during the same week. Paradise remained the most-streamed series in the U.S. from February 24 to March 2.

Analytics company Samba TV, which gathers viewership data from certain smart TVs and content providers, announced that Paradise was the third most-streamed program in the U.S. from February 3—9. The streaming aggregator Reelgood, which tracks 20 million monthly viewing decisions across all U.S. streaming platforms for original and acquired content on SVOD and AVOD services, reported that it was the second most-streamed series during the week of February 13. It subsequently reached the first place for the week ending February 27. Paradise also ranked No. 1 on Hulu's "Top 15 Today" list on March 7. Nielsen Media Research, which records streaming viewership on U.S. television screens, reported that from June 1, 2024, to May 31, 2025, Paradise was streamed for a total of 97.4 million hours.

=== Critical response ===
Critical response of Paradise
Season	Rotten Tomatoes	Metacritic
1	86% (81 reviews)	70% (36 reviews)
2	90% (90 reviews)	72% (21 reviews)

==== Season 1 ====
On the review aggregator website Rotten Tomatoes, 86% of 81 critics' reviews are positive, with an average rating of 7.75/10. The website's consensus reads: "Teeming with heady concepts and themes, Paradise is an overstuffed but addictively ambitious reunion of Sterling K. Brown and creator Dan Fogelman." Metacritic, which uses a weighted average, assigned a score of 70 out of 100 based on 36 critics, indicating "generally favorable" reviews.

==== Season 2 ====
On the review aggregator website Rotten Tomatoes, 90% of 90 critics' reviews are positive, with an average rating of 7.75/10. The website's consensus reads: "Paradise season 2 invests in its genre fare and delivers another gripping season filled with deeper intrigue, a stellar cast, and captivating drama." Metacritic, which uses a weighted average, assigned a score of 72 out of 100 based on 21 critics, indicating "generally favorable" reviews.

=== Accolades ===
Year	Award	Category	Nominee(s)	Result	Ref.
2025	Astra TV Awards	Best Actor in a Drama Series	Sterling K. Brown	Nominated	
2025	Astra TV Awards	Best Cast Ensemble in a Streaming Drama Series	Paradise	Nominated	
2025	Astra TV Awards	Best Supporting Actor in a Drama Series	James Marsden	Nominated	
2025	Astra TV Awards	Best Supporting Actress in a Drama Series	Julianne Nicholson	Nominated	
2025	Critics' Choice Super Awards	Best Actor in an Action Series, Limited Series or Made-for-TV Movie	Sterling K. Brown	Nominated	
2025	Critics' Choice Super Awards	Best Villain in a Series, Limited Series or Made-for-TV Movie	Julianne Nicholson	Nominated	
2025	Golden Trailer Awards	Most Original TV Spot – TV/Streaming Series	Hulu (for "Revelation")	Nominated	
2025	Gotham TV Awards	Outstanding Lead Performance in a Drama Series	Sterling K. Brown	Nominated	
2025	Gotham TV Awards	Outstanding Supporting Performance in a Drama Series	James Marsden	Nominated	
2025	Online Film & Television Association	Best Actor in a Drama Series	Sterling K. Brown	Nominated	
2025	Online Film & Television Association	Best Drama Series	Paradise	Nominated	
2025	Online Film & Television Association	Best Supporting Actor in a Drama Series	James Marsden	Nominated	
2025	Primetime Emmy Awards	Outstanding Drama Series	Dan Fogelman, Jess Rosenthal, John Hoberg, Sterling K. Brown, Steve Beers, Glenn Ficarra, John Requa, Gina Lucita Monreal, Jason Wilborn, Scott Weinger, and Chris Nguyen-Gia	Nominated	
2025	Primetime Emmy Awards	Outstanding Lead Actor in a Drama Series	Sterling K. Brown	Nominated	
2025	Primetime Emmy Awards	Outstanding Supporting Actor in a Drama Series	James Marsden	Nominated	
2025	Primetime Emmy Awards	Outstanding Supporting Actress in a Drama Series	Julianne Nicholson	Nominated	
2025	Television Critics Association Awards	Outstanding New Program	Paradise	Nominated	
2026	Actor Awards	Outstanding Performance by a Male Actor in a Drama Series	Sterling K. Brown	Nominated	
2026	Artios Awards	Television Series – Drama	Paradise	Nominated	
2026	Astra TV Awards	Best Drama Series	Paradise	Nominated	
2026	Astra TV Awards	Best Actor in a Drama Series	Sterling K. Brown	Nominated	
2026	Astra TV Awards	Best Supporting Actor in a Drama Series	James Marsden	Nominated	
2026	Astra TV Awards	Best Guest Actress in a Drama Series	Shailene Woodley	Nominated	
2026	Astra TV Awards	Best Streaming Drama Ensemble	Paradise	Nominated	
2026	Astra TV Awards	Best Directing in a Drama Series	Paradise	Nominated	
2026	Astra TV Awards	Best Writing in a Drama Series	Paradise	Nominated	
2026	Critics' Choice Awards	Best Actor in a Drama Series	Sterling K. Brown	Nominated	
2026	Critics' Choice Awards	Best Drama Series	Paradise	Nominated	
2026	Golden Globe Awards	Best Performance by an Actor in a Television Series – Drama	Sterling K. Brown	Nominated	
2026	Primetime Emmy Awards	Outstanding Directing for a Drama Series	Hanelle M. Culpepper (for "Exodus")	Nominated	
2026	Primetime Emmy Awards	Outstanding Drama Series	Dan Fogelman, Jess Rosenthal, John Hoberg, Sterling K. Brown, Steve Beers, Glenn Ficarra and John Requa, Jason Wilborn, Scott Weinger and Melissa Glenn, Chris Nguyen-Gia, and Randol Perelman-Taylor	Nominated	
2026	Primetime Emmy Awards	Outstanding Lead Actor in a Drama Series	Sterling K. Brown	Nominated	
2026	Primetime Emmy Awards	Outstanding Supporting Actress in a Drama Series	Julianne Nicholson	Nominated	
2026	Primetime Emmy Awards	Outstanding Casting for a Drama Series	Tiffany Little Canfield, Josh Einsohn, and Brian Sutow	Nominated	
2026	Primetime Emmy Awards	Outstanding Guest Actress in a Drama Series	Shailene Woodley (for "Graceland")	Won	
2026	Primetime Emmy Awards	Outstanding Special Visual Effects in a Single Episode	John Weckworth, John Stewart, Chapel Folger, John Brennick, Evan Underwood, Christian Day, Chris Messineo, Scott Gastellu, Linda Tremblay, Meliza Fermin, Kristofer Cross, and Blair Foord (for "Exodus")	Nominated	
2026	Satellite Awards	Best Actor in a Drama or Genre Series	Sterling K. Brown	Nominated	
