= Cassie Chadwick =

Con artist who claimed to be the illegitimate daughter and heiress of Andrew Carnegie

Cassie L. Chadwick
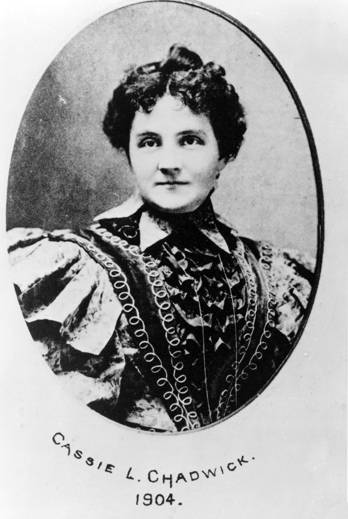
- 1904 cabinet card image of Chadwick
- Born: Elizabeth Bigley; 10 October 1857; Eastwood, United Province of Canada
- Died: 10 October 1907 (aged 50); Columbus, Ohio, U.S.
- Other names: Elizabeth Cunard; Emily Heathcliff; Lydia DeVere; Lydia Springsteen; Marie LaRose; Cassie Hoover; Cassie Chadwick; Cassie L. Chadwick
- Occupations: Clairvoyant, fortune teller, pimp
- Spouses: Dr. Wallace S. Springsteen; John R. Scott; Dr. Leroy S. Chadwick
- Children: 1
- Status: Died in prison
- Motive: Money
- Convictions: 9½ years
- Criminal charges: forgery seven counts forgery and seven counts conspiracy
- Penalty: 14 years prison and $70,000 fine

Cassie L. Chadwick (10 October 1857 – 10 October 1907) was the most well-known pseudonym used by Canadian con artist Elizabeth Bigley, who defrauded several American banks out of millions of dollars during the late 1800s and early 1900s by claiming to be an illegitimate daughter and heiress of the Scottish-American industrialist Andrew Carnegie. Newspaper accounts of the time described her as one of the greatest con artists in American history. She pulled off the scam in the Gilded Age of American history, during which time women were not allowed to vote or get loans from the banks, leading some historians to refer to her bank heist as one of the greatest in American history.

== Early life ==
Cassie Chadwick was born Elizabeth Bigley on October 10, 1857, in Appin, Canada West. She was the third daughter in a family of two boys and six girls born to Daniel and Mary Ann Bigley. Daniel was a railroad section hand. Three years later, the Bigleys moved to a small farm near Eastwood, Canada West. At sixteen, Betsy ran away from home, but was apprehended by police after attempting to obtain a $250 promissory note from a prosperous farmer. In 1878, Betsy was arrested for attempting to borrow money on a stolen pocket watch. Her father settled with the victim. Within the year, in Toronto, Betsy attempted to present herself as Elizabeth Cunard of the wealthy shipping family using a forged letter of introduction and a bogus check. After acquiring $10,000 in goods on credit, the scheme collapsed and Betsy fled Toronto. In March 1879, Betsy was arrested in Woodstock, Ontario, for attempting to negotiate forged promissory notes. She supplemented the notes with a calling card that read "Miss Bigley, Heiress to $15,000." Betsy stood trial on March 22, 1879, for passing forged notes. Her lawyers employed the insanity defense bolstered by Betsy's aberrant behavior in court. The jury found her not guilty. Her family sent her to live with her married sister, Alice York, whose husband was a Cleveland machinist.

== Start in the United States ==
After a brief stay with her sister and brother-in-law, Chadwick rented the lower floor of a house at 149 Garden Street, Cleveland from a Mrs. Brown. Claiming to be widowed, Chadwick assumed the name Madame Lydia DeVere and set up shop as a clairvoyant with funds from a bank loan on her sister and brother-in-law's furniture.

In 1882, as Lydia DeVere, Chadwick married Dr. Wallace Scott Springsteen in Cleveland. Springsteen was a veteran of the civil war. The couple exchanged vows before a justice of the peace on 21 November. She took the name Mrs. Lydia Springsteen and moved into the doctor's house at 3 Garden Street. A photograph and story of the wedding appeared in The Plain Dealer newspaper. The article led Chadwick's sister, Alice York, and various tradespeople to the home of Springsteen to demand payment for debts his wife had accumulated. After Springsteen confirmed the stories about Chadwick's past, he threw her out of the house. Springsteen filed for divorce (which was granted early in 1883) and settled her debts. They had been married twelve days.

After the dissolution of her first marriage, Chadwick re-established herself as a clairvoyant. As Madame Marie LaRose, she married John R. Scott, a farmer from Trumbull County, Ohio. She convinced Scott to sign a prenuptial agreement, citing abuse from her first husband. After four years of farm life, Chadwick went to a lawyer in Youngstown and left a sworn statement confessing adultery. She directed her lawyer to file for divorce from Scott.

After Chadwick's marriage to Scott was dissolved, she married yet again, this time to a wealthy businessman by the name of C.L. Hoover.

Chadwick would go on to give birth to a son in 1886 or 1887, who went by the name of Emil Hoover in Cleveland. It is unknown if he was the son of Chadwick's third husband. At the death of her third husband in 1888, it was claimed that he left Chadwick about $50,000 in his will.

== First U.S. fraud trial ==
In 1889 Chadwick was convicted and sentenced to 9 1/2 years in a penitentiary in Toledo for forgery. She was paroled in 1893 and returned to Cleveland.

== Chadwick's fourth husband ==
Upon returning to Cleveland in 1893, Chadwick assumed the name Mrs. Cassie Hoover and opened a brothel on the city's west side. At the brothel, she met her next husband, a wealthy widower doctor named Leroy Chadwick. Knowing of the doctor's recent loss, Chadwick played the part of a genteel widow who ran a respectable boarding house for women. When Leroy Chadwick responded that the establishment was a well-known brothel, "Mrs. Hoover" fainted. Once revived, she claimed that she would never run such an establishment. She begged the doctor to immediately take her from the building, lest anyone think she was complicit in its operation.

== As Cassie Chadwick ==
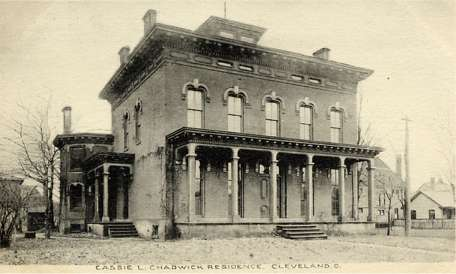
The Euclid Avenue residence of Cassie Chadwick

In 1897 Cassie and Leroy were married. During her time as the wife of the highly respected Dr. Chadwick, it is unclear whether he knew that she had a son. Also, it is unclear whether Dr. Chadwick knew that Emil was in the care of one of the women at the brothel. When charged with forgery, Chadwick identified herself in court records as single with no children. However, in the 1900 United States census (District 97, Cleveland, Cuyahoga County Ohio), she identified herself as Cassie Chadwick, born 3 February 1862 in Pennsylvania. Her son Emil was enumerated as Emil Chadwick, born September 1886 in Canada. Chadwick's spending habits exceeded those of her richer neighbours along Cleveland's Euclid Avenue, then known as "Millionaires' Row". Instead of being welcomed into the exclusive enclave of the Rockefellers, the Hannas, the Hays and the Mathers, Chadwick was thought of as a curious woman who tried in vain to buy the favors of some of the wealthiest families in the nation. When invited to social events, it was only out of obligation to her husband.

== The Carnegie con ==
Following her marriage in 1897, Chadwick began her largest, most successful con game: that of establishing herself as Andrew Carnegie's daughter. During a visit to New York City, she asked one of her husband's acquaintances, a lawyer named Dillon, to take her to Carnegie's home. In reality, Chadwick visited Carnegie's housekeeper while ostensibly trying to check credentials. When Chadwick came back, she dropped a paper. Dillon took it up and noticed it was a promissory note for $2 million with Carnegie's signature. When Dillon promised to keep Chadwick's secret, she "revealed" that she was Carnegie's illegitimate child. Carnegie was supposedly so wracked with guilt that he showered huge amounts of money on her. Chadwick also claimed that there was $7 million in promissory notes tucked away in her Cleveland home, and she was to inherit $400 million upon Carnegie's death. Dillon arranged a safe deposit box for her document.

The information leaked to the financial markets in northern Ohio, and banks began to offer their services to Chadwick. For the next eight years, she used her fake background to obtain loans that eventually totaled around $2 million ($72 million in today's currency). Chadwick relied on the assumption that no one would ask Carnegie about an illegitimate daughter for fear of embarrassing him. Since the loans also came with usurious interest rates, the bankers would not admit to granting them. Chadwick forged securities in Carnegie's name for further proof. Bankers assumed that Carnegie would vouch for any debts and that they would be fully repaid once Carnegie died.

Chadwick carried out a lavish lifestyle as a result of her con. She bought diamond necklaces, enough clothes to fill 30 closets, and a gold organ. She became known as "the Queen of Ohio." She claimed to give money to the poor and to the suffrage movement.

In November 1904, Chadwick received a $190,000 loan from Herbert B. Newton, a Brookline, Massachusetts banker. Newton was shocked when he learned of the other loans Chadwick had received, and called his loan in. Chadwick could not pay, and Newton sued. At the time, she had accumulated debts over $1 million. It was also discovered that a number of securities being held for her in various banks were worthless. When Carnegie was later asked about her, through a spokesman he denied ever knowing her. Carnegie further stated he had not signed a promissory note in more than 30 years. Chadwick fled to New York, but was soon arrested at her apartment at the Hotel Breslin and taken back to Cleveland. When she was arrested, she was wearing a money belt containing over $100,000. Leroy Chadwick and his adult daughter hastily left Cleveland for a European tour when the scandal broke. He filed for divorce before leaving on the tour.

The news sent shock waves through the Cleveland banking community. Citizen's National Bank of Oberlin, which had loaned her $800,000, suffered a massive run that forced it into bankruptcy.

== Second U.S. fraud trial ==
Andrew Carnegie attended Chadwick's trial, wishing to see the woman who had successfully conned the nation's bankers into believing that she was his heir. Other attendees included members of the Millionaires' Row families from whom she had tried so hard to gain acceptance. The trial was a media circus. On 10 March 1905 a Cleveland court sentenced her to 14 years in prison and a fine of $70,000 for conspiracy to bankrupt the Citizen's National Bank and conspiracy against the government (Citizen's Bank, as a federally chartered bank, was an agent of the federal government).

== Prison ==
On 1 January 1906, Chadwick was sent to the Ohio State Penitentiary in Columbus. She brought with her trunks of goods for her prison cell, including clothing, photographs, and furniture. The prison warden allowed this due to her celebrity status.

As her health deteriorated, Chadwick began writing explicit instructions for her funeral. She instructed her son Emil to send a portion of her hidden funds to Canada for the purchase of a tombstone for the family plot. Chadwick suffered a "nervous collapse" on 17 September 1907, leaving her blind. The New York Times reported on 9 October 1907 that Chadwick was suffering from heart and stomach problems.

== Death ==
Chadwick died on her 50th birthday in the Columbus penitentiary, 10 October 1907. The funeral service was officiated by Reverend F.W. Thompson. Her interment was 16 October 1907 in the Episcopal Cemetery (present day Woodstock Anglican Cemetery "A" section VanSittart Avenue) in Woodstock, Ontario.

== Fallout ==
For a time, the Chadwick Mansion on Euclid Avenue and East 82nd Street in Cleveland became a tourist destination. In the early 1920s, it was torn down for the construction of the Euclid Avenue Temple (now Liberty Hill Baptist Church).

Chadwick's housekeeper, Mary Londraville, took a satchel apparently for Chadwick's son that the receiver wanted as he thought it to have contained valuables.

Andrew Carnegie himself was so distressed about how his name had been misused, he made a gift that helped build the Oberlin Carnegie Building, used by Oberlin College Library.

== In popular culture ==
Chadwick was the subject of the Canadian TV movie Love and Larceny (1985), where the role of Betsy Bigley was played by Jennifer Dale.

Wendy Crewson portrays Chadwick in "The Murdoch Sting" (January 27, 2014), episode 13 of season 7 of the Canadian television period drama Murdoch Mysteries.

In Seasons 2 and 3 of the HBO TV series The Gilded Age, the character of Maud Beaton, portrayed by Nicole Brydon Bloom, is loosely based on Cassie Chadwick.
