= The Long Road Home (miniseries) =

American drama miniseries

- Television release poster
- Genre: Drama
- Created by: Mikko Alanne
- Based on: The Long Road Home: A Story of War and Family by Martha Raddatz
- Starring: Michael Kelly; Jason Ritter; Kate Bosworth; Sarah Wayne Callies; Jeremy Sisto; Noel Fisher; Jon Beavers; E. J. Bonilla; Jorge Diaz; Ian Quinlan; Darius Homayoun; Patrick Schwarzenegger
- Composer: Jeff Beal
- Country of origin: United States
- Original language: English
- No. of episodes: 8

Production
- Executive producers: Peter Carrick; Mikko Alanne; Benjamin Anderson; Edward McGurn; Mike Medavoy; Jason Clark; Mikael Salomon
- Running time: 42 minutes
- Production companies: Fuzzy Door Productions; Finngate Television; Phoenix Pictures

Original release
- Network: National Geographic
- Release: November 7 – December 19, 2017

The Long Road Home is an American drama miniseries created by Mikko Alanne. It is based on the 2007 book The Long Road Home: A Story of War and Family by Martha Raddatz, which tells the story of a U.S. Army unit during the first day of the siege of Sadr City in 2004. The series stars Michael Kelly, Jason Ritter, Kate Bosworth, Sarah Wayne Callies, Jeremy Sisto, Noel Fisher, Jon Beavers, E. J. Bonilla, Jorge Diaz, Ian Quinlan, Darius Homayoun and Patrick Schwarzenegger. The miniseries premiered on National Geographic on November 7, 2017.

== Cast ==
- Michael Kelly as LTC Gary Volesky
- Jason Ritter as Troy Denomy
- Kate Bosworth as Gina Denomy
- Sarah Wayne Callies as Leann Volesky
- Jeremy Sisto as SGT Robert Miltenberger
- Noel Fisher as PFC Tomas Young
- Jon Beavers as SGT Eric Bourquin
- E. J. Bonilla as LT Shane Aguero
- Jorge Diaz as SPC Israel Garza
- Ian Quinlan as SPC Robert Arsiaga
- Darius Homayoun as Jassim Al-Lani
- Patrick Schwarzenegger as SGT Ben Hayhurst
- Katherine Willis as Cathy Smith
- Franklin Silverio as SPC Acevedo
- Joshua Brennan as SGT Jackson
- Joey Luthman as SPC Jonathan Riddell
- Thomas McDonell as SPC Carl Wild
- Devonne Palmer as CPL Allan Alexander
- Charlie Parrish as Burkholder
- Micah Pediford as CPL Coleman
- Devyn Placide as PVT Derrick Perry
- Alex Ross as SFC Jerry Swope
- Ezekiel Z. Swinford as SPC Matt Fisk
- Roland Buck III as SPC Rafael Martin
- May Calamawy as Faiza
- Rana Haddad as Samira
- Peter Malek as Essam
- Laith Nakli as Alim
- Bruce Peacock as SSG Haubert
- Carter Redwood as Pedro Guzman
- Jill Blackwood as Belinda Miltenberger
- Mike Davis as CPT Dylan Randazzo
- Andrew Michael Johnson as SPC Joshua Rogers
- Ian Pala as SPC Seth Weibley
- Christopher Dontrell Piper as SGT Reginald Butler
- John Trentacoste Jr. as SPC Sean Crabbe
- Luis Amory as SGT Miranda
- Brandon Charles Chesser as SPC Jonathan Denny
- Karina Ortiz as Lupita Garza
- Sebastian Cook as Denomy's Soldier
- Kenny Leu as SGT Eddie Chen
- Parker Weathersbee as Elijah Aguero
- Roby Attal as CPT David Mathias
- Josh Cavazos as LT Clay Spicer
- David DeLao as Chaplain Pena
- Cotie Domm as PFC Luke Fournier
- Garrett Graham as CPT John Moore
- Charlotte Delaney Riggs as Chapel Kid
- Gurie Sheffield as SFC Butler
- Oriana Ledesma as High-school Student and Denomy’s Soldier
- Duncan Coe as LT Cannon
- Patrick Gathron as SPC Ahmed Cason
- Joshua Phipps as SPC Stephen Hiller
- Rochelle Robinson as Cindy Sheehan
- Josh Vinyard as Jerry Bune
- Josh Blaylock as SPC Packwood
- Rumor Ledesma as Child Church Attendee

== Episodes ==
No.	Title	Directed by	Written by	Original release date	US viewers (millions)
1	"Black Sunday, Part 1"	Phil Abraham	Mikko Alanne	November 7, 2017	1.099
The First Cavalry Division launches a rescue mission when one of their platoons is ambushed by thousands of enemy insurgents in the City of Sadr, a Shīʿa-majority suburb district of Baghdad. As news break, the lives of the soldiers' families at Fort Hood faced with uncertainty.
2	"Black Sunday, Part 2"	Phil Abraham	Lana Cho	November 7, 2017	1.099
3	"Into the Unknown"	Mikael Salomon	Alan DiFiore	November 14, 2017	0.693
Denomy (Jason Ritter) leads the first rescue into Sadr City under heavy fire. It is clear the locals have been preparing for this ambush for weeks.
4	"In the Valley of Death"	Mikael Salomon	Mikko Alanne	November 21, 2017	0.517
Before Staff Sergeant Robert Miltenberger’s (Jeremy Sisto) deployment, he believes to have a premonition that he will die in Iraq.
5	"The Choice"	Phil Abraham	Mikko Alanne & Scott Gold	November 28, 2017	0.727
Jassim’s troubled past is revealed and his allegiance is tested. Aguero is forced to make a choice that his has lasting psychological effects on platoon.
6	"A City Called Heaven"	Phil Abraham	Mikko Alanne & Alan DiFiore	December 5, 2017	0.593
Tomas Young (Noel Fisher) experiences active combat, setting of a long process of personal development in him with consequences to those around him.
7	"Abandon Hope"	Mikael Salomon	Amy Louise Johnson & Kelly Wiles	December 12, 2017	0.553
8	"Always Dream of Me"	Phil Abraham	Mikko Alanne	December 19, 2017	0.611

== Reception ==
=== Critical reception ===
On the review aggregator website Rotten Tomatoes, the miniseries holds a score of 77% based on 13 reviews. The website's consensus reads: "Though narrow in scope, The Long Road Home is a sobering and respectfully told tribute to soldiers and their families."

Maureen Ryan writing for Variety gave the show a mixed review, citing some strengths but perceiving it as painful to watch and propagandistic in tone at times with major weaknesses throughout. She lauded the show's success at depicting the logistics of war and creating empathy for American soldiers and the ethical choices they were faced with during their missions in the US Invasion of Iraq. However, she argued that these intimate psychological portrayals of extreme situations lack well-written characterizations of the protagonists with whom one is meant to empathize. She did, however, laud the actors for their performances in these roles, locating the fault instead in the show’s writing. In Ryan’s view, the dialogue was cumbersome and cliché, and the scenes away from the battlefield are superfluous and needlessly stretch the show's runtime thereby sacrificing a lot of its watchability. Ryan described the tone of the show to at times be highly propagandistic, making the show itself almost feel like propaganda for either the United States Army or a "narrowly defined vision of America" whose ability to create any kind of poignant psychological effect however is foiled by the show's generic and predictable writing outside of combat scenes. According to her the show at times attempts to create empathy for the Iraqis and their experience of the invasion and subsequent massacres. These attempts fall short based on a lack of development for any single Iraqi character; a quality they supposedly share with most characters in the show.

=== Awards and nominations ===
Year	Ceremony	Category	Recipient(s)	Result	Ref.
2017	23rd Critics' Choice Television Awards	Best Limited Series	The Long Road Home	Nominated	
2018	MovieGuide Awards	Epiphany Prize®	The Long Road Home	Won	
2018	MovieGuide Awards	Faith & Freedom	The Long Road Home	Won	
