= Lost in Oz =

American animated television series

- Genre: Fantasy
- Based on: The Wonderful Wizard of Oz by: L. Frank Baum
- Developed by: Abram Makowka; Darin Mark; Jared Mark; Mark Warshaw
- Directed by: Craig George
- Voices of: Ashley Boettcher; Nika Futterman; Jorge Diaz; Chris Cox; Eric Bauza; Keith Ferguson; Jennifer Hale; Gina Gershon; Garrett McQuaid; Stephen Stanton; Fred Tatasciore
- Theme music composer: Mark Mothersbaugh
- Composer: Adam Berry
- Country of origin: United States
- Original language: English
- No. of seasons: 2
- No. of episodes: 26

Production
- Executive producers: Abram Makowka; Darin Mark; Jared Mark; Mark Warshaw
- Producer: Therese Trujillo
- Running time: 24 minutes
- Production companies: Bureau of Magic; Amazon Studios

Original release
- Network: Amazon Prime Video
- Release: June 26, 2015 – June 8, 2018

Lost in Oz is an American animated television series that premiered on June 26, 2015, on Amazon Prime Video. Originally part of a pilot program, the pilot episode was later re-released as Lost in Oz: Extended Adventure on November 2, 2016, combining the first three episodes. The full series was released later.

== Synopsis ==
In episodes 1–13, Dorothy Gale is a precocious child who, with her dog Toto, is swept up to the Land of Oz without a clear way home. To travel back, Dorothy must collect all the different types of magical elements with her newfound friends, the streetwise witch West and friendly Munchkin Ojo, while a sinister plot unfolds around them.

In episodes 14–26, Dorothy and Toto, working together with their friends, must find their way out of the Deadly Desert and save Emerald City from the Nome Kingdom to have any chance of getting back to Kansas.

== Cast ==
- Ashley Boettcher as Dorothy Gale
- Nika Futterman as West
- Jorge Diaz as Ojo
- Chris Cox as Toto, Pugmill, Patchwork Doll
- Alexander Polinsky as Fitz
- Keith Ferguson as Reigh the Cowardly Lion
- Stephen Stanton as Scarecrow, Xandort
- Gina Gershon as Langwidere
- Jennifer Hale as Glinda, the Good Witch
- Allison Mack (originally season 1), Grey DeLisle (season 1 redub-ROS) as Evelyn, Dorothy’s mother. As of June 2018, Allison Mack was dubbed out of her role for future airings due to her arrest in connection with controversial organization NXIVM.
- Garrett McQuaid as Nome King
- Eric Bauza as Kaliko, Axel
- Bumper Robinson as Smith and Tinker
- Kath Soucie as Cyra
- Fred Tatasciore as General Guph, Jo
- Debra Wilson as Brenda

== Episodes ==
Season	Episodes	Originally released	
Season	Episodes	First released	Last released
1	13	June 26, 2015	August 4, 2017
2	13	June 8, 2018	June 8, 2018

=== Season 1 (2015–17) ===
No. overall	No. in season	Title	Directed by	Written by	Original release date	Prod. code
1	1	"Go Forth"	Paul Stodolny	Abram Makowka, Darin Mark & Jared Mark	June 26, 2015	101
After being transported from Kansas to Oz on a magical tornado, twelve-year-old Dorothy Gale finds herself lost in a strange new land with her trusty dog Toto. With the help of some new Ozian friends, Dorothy and Toto begin their search for the magic they need to get back home. In The Yellow Brick Line Station, Fitz makes West use her "weird evil self". Dorothy arrives, Fitz turns West and Ojo into stone, The look Out arrives, more.....
2	2	"Dorothy Meets a Lion"	Jae Hong Kim	Abram Makowka, Darin Mark & Jared Mark	December 2, 2016	102
In her search for magic to get home, Dorothy goes looking for Glinda the Good, the most powerful witch in Emerald City. But when she crosses paths with Reigh, the Cowardly Lion, he steals her magic travel journal forcing Dorothy to track him down to retrieve it.
3	3	"Monkeys Fly"	Jae Hong Kim	Abram Makowka, Darin Mark & Jared Mark	December 2, 2016	103
After getting key information from Reigh, Dorothy unravels a puzzle to reveal Glinda's mysterious castle and must outsmart evil apprentice magician Fitz and his Winged Monkeys to get inside.
4	4	"Dorothy Meets the Scarecrow"	Jae Hong Kim	Shion Takeuchi	August 3, 2017	104
Dorothy enters Glinda's castle only to find that the good witch is missing! Dorothy sets out to unravel the mystery with the only other inhabitant of the deserted castle, Scarecrow, whose faulty memory proves less than useful.
5	5	"The Pearl of Pingaree"	Jae Hong Kim	Abram Makowka	August 3, 2017	105
Dorothy's investigation into Glinda's disappearance leads her to the Munchkin Farm where she discovers a magical pearl that reveals the truth. Before she can use it to get closer to home, however, she's confronted by an emboldened Fitz.
6	6	"Wake Up, Wake Up, Wake Up!"	Jae Hong Kim	Jared Mark	August 3, 2017	106
After Dorothy identifies Fitz as the Crooked Magician, he kidnaps Toto, forcing Dorothy to team up with Agent Pugmill to go on a mission to rescue her dog.
7	7	"Little Black Lies"	Jae Hong Kim	Amy Wolfram	August 3, 2017	107
West's evil aunt Langwidere persuades the team to retrieve Glinda's magical pearl, but when Dorothy and West can't agree on which rules they're willing to break to get it, Dorothy finds herself even farther from home.
8	8	"The Sticks"	Jae Hong Kim	Darin Mark	August 3, 2017	108
Dorothy and West go in search of Langwidere, but come face to face with Glinda herself. The Good Witch has a plan to send Dorothy home... but first they'll have to retrieve the stolen magic of Emerald City.
9	9	"Down the Yellow Brick Line"	Jae Hong Kim	May Chan	August 3, 2017	109
On their way to find the stolen magic, Dorothy, West, Ojo, and Toto are taken prisoner by Fitz. After they're captured, the team must to put aside their differences and work together to defeat a dangerous band of Growleywogs.
10	10	"Bogspeed, Little Shanks!"	Jae Hong Kim	Shion Takeuchi	August 3, 2017	110
As the team zeroes in on the location of the missing magic, and Dorothy's ticket home, they enlist the help of the Growleywogs to defeat the Nomes.
11	11	"11:11"	Jae Hong Kim	Abram Makowka	August 3, 2017	111
When Langwidere imprisons Dorothy and Toto inside a magical painting, our heroes find a secret portal that leads to an unexpected ally. Together, they must escape their painted prison before Langwidere takes over Emerald City, and makes Dorothy's return home an impossibility.
12	12	"Welcome Back, Glinda"	Jae Hong Kim	Jared Mark	August 3, 2017	112
Dorothy, Toto, and Glinda must escape their painted prison and rally their friends before Langwidere magically erases them from everyone's memories, changes the course of history in Oz, and leaves Dorothy and Toto stranded there forever.
13	13	"Go For Kansas"	Jae Hong Kim	Darin Mark	August 4, 2017	113
Dorothy and her friends must sneak into Glinda's castle, now occupied by Langwidere, and defeat the wicked witch in order to restore Emerald City's memories and finally send Dorothy home. When they reach her house, Dorothy finds Scarecrow and they are not in Kansas.

=== Season 2 (2018) ===
No. overall	No. in season	Title	Directed by	Written by	Original release date	Prod. code
14	1	"The Deadly Desert"	Jae Hong Kim	Abram Makowka	June 8, 2018	201
When Dorothy, Toto, and Scarecrow find themselves stranded in the Deadly Desert, they follow a mysterious beacon in search of help... but will it lead them to friends or foes?
15	2	"Magic from Nothing"	Jae Hong Kim	Jared Mark	June 8, 2018	202
West struggles to control the powerful magic she's been experiencing ever since she and Dorothy defeated Langwidere. Meanwhile, in the Nome Kingdom, Dorothy hatches a plan to escape with Toto and Scarecrow before it's too late.
16	3	"The Still Season"	Craig George	Darin Mark	June 8, 2018	203
Dorothy finishes building her escape sandboat, but she'll need the wind in order to get back to Emerald City with her friends, and the Still Season is fast approaching. Meanwhile, West discovers the missing ingredient necessary to control her magical powers.
17	4	"Villa Roquat"	Jae Woo Kim	Shion Takeuchi & Abram Makowka	June 8, 2018	204
Dorothy, Toto, and Scarecrow sail across the Deadly Desert with their new "frenemy" Roquat along for the ride, but an unexpected detour lands them in serious trouble.
18	5	"The Magic Map"	Craig George	Amy Wolfram	June 8, 2018	205
When General Guph sends his fiercest henchman after Dorothy and her friends, our heroes in both Emerald City and the Deadly Desert find themselves on the run.
19	6	"Shortcut to Emerald City"	Jae Woo Kim	Shion Takeuchi & Abram Makowka	June 8, 2018	206
Dorothy, Toto, Scarecrow, and Roquat find themselves at the entrance to a mysterious tunnel that connects Emerald City and the Deadly Desert, but nothing can prepare them for what they find on the other side.
20	7	"Going Forth"	Craig George	Gavin Hignight	June 8, 2018	207
After General Guph fills Dorothy's journal with magic and sends her house flying away on another tornado, she and all her Emerald City friends find themselves lost again.
21	8	"Kansas Magic"	Jae Woo Kim	Ernie Altbacker	June 8, 2018	208
Dorothy and her friends are trapped in Kansas, but with the shocking discovery that magic also exists in Dorothy's world, they may find a way back to Oz.
22	9	"The Eclipse"	Craig George	May Chan	June 8, 2018	209
Dorothy finds all the magic she needs to send her friends back to Oz, but first they'll all have to join forces to save Reigh from Animal Control.
23	10	"Saving Cyra"	Jae Woo Kim	Abram Makowka	June 8, 2018	210
Dorothy and her friends arrive back in Emerald City, where a desperate attempt to save Cyra leads West to seek help from an old foe.
24	11	"The Nome King’s Belt"	Craig George	Eugene Son	June 8, 2018	211
Dorothy and her friends must find the Nome King's Belt before Guph can get his hands on this magical artifact and take control of the Fairylands.
25	12	"Escape from Nome Kingdom"	Jae Woo Kim	Ernie Altbacker	June 8, 2018	212
After Guph swaps the populations of Emerald City and the Nome Kingdom, Dorothy and her friends once again have to escape and find their way home.
26	13	"We Speak Mirror"	Craig George	Darin Mark & Jared Mark	June 8, 2018	213
Outnumbered and out of magic, Dorothy and her friends must outwit Guph to retrieve the Nome King's Belt and save Emerald City.

== Awards ==
At the 44th Daytime Creative Arts Emmy Awards, the series won Outstanding Children's Animated Program, Outstanding Sound Editing - Animation, Outstanding Sound Mixing - Animation, and was nominated for Outstanding Writing in an Animated Program, and Outstanding Casting for an Animated Series or Special.
