= Jon Beavers =

American actor (born 1984)

- Beavers in 2026
- Born: May 21, 1984 (age 42); Iowa City, Iowa, U.S.
- Occupations: Actor, playwright
- Spouse: Hannah Beavers (m. 2012)

Jon Beavers (born May 21, 1984) is an American actor and playwright known for starring in The Fresh Beat Band, The Long Road Home, Horizon: An American Saga, and Paradise. Beavers co-created the musical The Unfortunates with Ian Merrigan, Ramiz Monsef, Casey Hurt, and Kristoffer Diaz. The musical premiered at the Oregon Shakespeare Festival in 2013 and was produced again at ACT San Francisco in 2016.

== Filmography ==
=== Film ===
Year	Film	Role	Notes
2020	The Only One	David	
2021	Licorice Pizza	Number 12 Creep	
2022	Soft & Quiet	Craig	
2024	Horizon: An American Saga – Chapter 1	Junior Sykes	
2024	Horizon: An American Saga – Chapter 2	Junior Sykes	
2025	One Battle After Another	1776 James	
2026	Being Heumann	Jim Pechin	

=== Television ===
Year	Title	Role	Notes
2005	Malcolm in the Middle	Man	Episode: "Burning Man"
2009–2013	The Fresh Beat Band	Twist	Main role
2014	Gotham	Comedian	Episode: "Pilot"
2015	NCIS	Sam Butler	Episode: "Spinning Wheel"
2015–2016	Fresh Beat Band of Spies	Twist	Main role
2017	The Long Road Home	Sgt. Eric Bourquin	Miniseries
2018	S.W.A.T.	Scott	Episode: "Fences"
2018	Criminal Minds	Tony Capilano	Episode: "The Capilanos"
2018–2021	Liza on Demand	Luke / DJ Nuke	3 episodes
2019	Unbelievable	Officer Curran	Episode: "Episode 1"
2019–2021	Animal Kingdom	Jake Dunmore	24 episodes
2019–2020	Briarpatch	Floyd Ferness	3 episodes
2020	9-1-1: Lone Star	Eric	Episode: "Bum Steer"
2021	Chicago P.D.	Elliot Knox	Episode: "The One Next to Me"
2021	That Girl Lay Lay	Noodles	Episode: "Make Room for Lay Lay"
2022	Bel-Air	Kylo	5 episodes
2024	Sugar	Carl	Episodes: "Olivia" and "These People, These Places"
2025–2026	Paradise	Billy Pace	7 episodes
2025	Watson	William "Fitz" Fitzgerald	Episode: "Livvy Sees the Doctor"
2026	Tracker	James Clark	Episode: "The Field Trip"

=== Video games ===
Year	Title	Role	Notes
2011	Nickelodeon Dance	Twist	
2012	Nickelodeon Dance 2	Twist	
