= Handle with Care (upcoming film) =

American drama film

- Directed by: Matthew James Thompson
- Screenplay by: Matthew James Thompson
- Produced by: Ashim Ahuja; Barret Hacia
- Starring: Justin H. Min; Nicole Brydon Bloom
- Production company: White Whale
- Country: United States
- Language: English

Handle with Care is an upcoming film written and directed by Matthew James Thompson, and starring Justin H. Min and Nicole Brydon Bloom as a divorcing couple.

== Premise ==
The film examines the emotional and legal fall out from a short lived marriage and the subsequent divorce.

== Cast ==
- Justin H. Min as Cole
- Nicole Brydon Bloom as Reese
- Elizabeth Paige
- Jon Rudnitsky
- Peter Gerety
- Michael Cyril Creighton
- Amir Arison
- Catherine Curtin
- Winslow Bright

== Production ==
The film is the feature length debut of writer and director Matthew James Thompson. It is produced by Barret Hacia and Ashim Ahuja for White Whale. Thompson is also an executive producer along with Justin H. Min.

The cast is led by Justin H. Min and Nicole Brydon Bloom with Elizabeth Paige and Jon Rudnitsky and includes Peter Gerety, Michael Cyril Creighton, Amir Arison, Catherine Curtain, and Winslow Bright.

Principal photography took place in New York in October 2024.

Makeup by Lauren Bridges, founder of Barbara Jean Agency.
