= 1BR =

2019 film by David Marmor

- Release poster
- Directed by: David Marmor
- Written by: David Marmor
- Produced by: Alok Mishra; Sam Sandweiss; Shane Vorster; Allard Cantor; Jarrod Murray; Nic Izzi; Jake Alden-Falconer; Austin Thomas
- Starring: Nicole Brydon Bloom; Giles Matthey; Taylor Nichols; Alan Blumenfeld; Celeste Sully; Susan Davis; Clayton Hoff; Earnestine Phillips; Naomi Grossman
- Cinematography: David Bolen
- Edited by: Rich Fox; David Marmor; Anna Rottke
- Music by: Ronen Landa
- Production company: Malevolent Films
- Distributed by: Dark Sky Films
- Release dates: July 19, 2019 (Fantasia); April 24, 2020 (United States)
- Running time: 90 minutes
- Country: United States
- Language: English
- Box office: $16,125

1BR is a 2019 American horror thriller film written and directed by David Marmor, in his directorial debut. The title is an abbreviation of "one bedroom," commonly seen in real estate listings. The film premiered at Fantasia International Film Festival in July 2019, and was released in the United States in 2020. The film follows the story of Sarah, an aspiring costume designer who moves into a one-bedroom apartment in Los Angeles, unaware that the complex is owned by a cult who uses torture to force new residents to join their community.

== Plot ==
After recently moving to Los Angeles to seek independence, as well as enroll in a fashion and costume design course, Sarah goes apartment hunting and secures a one-bedroom apartment in a seemingly friendly neighborhood complex that houses approximately 30 residents. Sarah bonds with some of the residents, most notably Jerry, the manager; Brian, her neighbor; and Edie, an elderly lady. Sarah develops sleep deprivation and lethargy after moving into her new apartment due to loud noises that she hears at night. Because of her lack of sleep, she forgets to hand in her portfolio to her enrollment course. She confides in her co-worker and friend Lisa, who comforts her. During a barbeque party, Lester, a resident, recommends the book The Power of Community by Charles D. Ellerby to Sarah, which she politely declines.

One night, while unable to sleep, Sarah is attacked and drugged unconscious by Brian and some other residents. As Sarah awakens in a sealed room, Jerry and Brian inform her that all the residents in the apartment complex are part of a cult and that she has been chosen as a new member. The cult was started 30 years earlier by a man named Charles D. Ellerby, whose book The Power of Community includes four key principles that the cult members live by. Jerry and Brian have cut off all her contact from the outside world and ensured that no one will try to find her now that she is in the cult's captivity.

Sarah unwillingly undergoes a torturous initiation process that every resident before her also had to endure. Once it is over, she is given a copy of The Power of Community and she is told to read and study the book. Sarah is also given a few other tasks to perform in order to contribute to the cult, such as marrying Lester, carrying out surveillance of the members via CCTV footage, and cooking for the children. Initially resistant to the cult, Sarah is slowly brainwashed into accepting and joining it as they promise her a sense of belonging and purpose. Eventually, Sarah is branded with the cult's logo after taking a lie detector test that shows she has truly become sincere about wanting to be in the cult.

Some time later, the cult reopens its doors to find a new member under a guise of an open house seeking a new resident. Sarah discovers that Lisa has come to the open house. She is shocked when she learns that Jerry has chosen Lisa as the next member and she warns Jerry that the strong-minded Lisa will be hard to convert. During Lisa's forced initiation process, Sarah reveals herself to Lisa and tells her that joining the cult will change her life for the better. Lisa, however, manages to get Sarah back to sanity and Sarah realizes she has to escape the cult. They attempt an escape together, but Lisa is shot dead by Jerry in the process.

Sarah grabs Jerry's gun from him and she proceeds to kill Jerry and Brian who try to stop her from escaping. Sarah escapes the apartment complex and runs happily into the streets thinking she is free. Once outside, she realizes that all the houses on the surrounding property belong to CDE residences (abbreviation of Charles D. Ellerby, the founding father of the cult) and the logo for CDE residences is the same as that for the cult. An alarm sounds for all of the buildings and she realizes that she will be hunted by the cult members. Sarah runs down the street, determined to escape.

== Cast ==
- Nicole Brydon Bloom as Sarah, a young woman who has just moved to Los Angeles. She is shy and rarely stands up for herself. Sarah takes a job at an office while waiting to get into a design program.
- Giles Matthey as Brian, Sarah's next door neighbor at the apartment complex, and Jerry's right-hand man. He served in Iraq before coming to Los Angeles.
- Taylor Nichols as Jerry, the manager of the apartments and the overseer of Sarah's branch of the Community
- Alan Blumenfeld as Sarah's estranged father, who cheated on his wife (Sarah's mother) while she was ill. Sarah moves away and becomes financially independent because of him.
- Naomi Grossman as Janice, a member of the apartment Community
- Celeste Sully as Lisa, Sarah's friend and colleague from work. Unlike Sarah she is assertive and self-assured. Her mantra is "it's my fucking life." She lands the same apartment after Sarah is accepted into the Community.
- Susan Davis as Miss Stanhope, the oldest tenant of the Community, who quickly befriends Sarah. Miss Stanhope suffers from heart problems and is cared for by the Community residents. During Sarah's torture sessions she is brought in to break her.
- Clayton Hoff as Lester, an antisocial disfigured tenant who recently lost his wife to cancer. He later becomes Sarah's arranged husband.
- Earnestine Phillips as Esther, an accomplished doctor who handles all medical procedures within the apartments.
- Curtis Webster as Charles D. Ellerby, the founder of the apartment complexes in Los Angeles and author of The Power of Community. His teachings use various forms of torture to encourage conformity and unity.

== Production ==
During the early stages of production, the film's offices were victim of the Skirball Fire in 2017, and were forced to use producer Alok Mishra's home in View Park-Windsor Hills as the base of operations during filming. The outside exteriors of the apartments were used on-location in Los Angeles, with the indoor scenes being shot on a soundstage.

== Release ==
The film premiered at Fantasia International Film Festival on July 18, 2019. The film had a limited theatrical release and VOD release on April 24, 2020, before beginning to stream on Netflix on August 28.

Over its first week of release on Netflix, the film was among the top five most-streamed films, reaching number one in the film section of the site.

== Reception ==
On the review aggregator website Rotten Tomatoes, the film holds an approval rating of 88% based on 80 reviews, with an average rating of 6.6/10. The website's critics consensus reads, "1BR's occasionally ordinary storytelling is more than outweighed by tight direction, interesting ideas, and an effective blend of horror and thoughtful drama." On Metacritic, the film has a weighted average score of 56 out of 100 based on 8 critic reviews, indicating "mixed or average" reviews.

John DeFore of The Hollywood Reporter wrote: "Taken on its own terms, it's a solid if hardly revolutionary thriller that bodes well for the filmmaker's future in genre films."
