= Kristoffer Diaz =

American writer

Kristoffer Díaz
- Education: New York University (BA) (MFA); Brooklyn College (MFA)
- Occupations: Playwright, screenwriter, educator
- Website: kristofferdiaz.com

Kristoffer Díaz is an American playwright, screenwriter, and educator. In 2010, he was a finalist for the Pulitzer Prize for Drama for The Elaborate Entrance of Chad Deity. The play gave him the Lucille Lortel Awards for Outstanding Play and the New York Times Outstanding Playwright Award. He wrote the book for the jukebox musical Hell's Kitchen, for which he received a nomination for the Tony Award for Best Book of a Musical as well as the Lucille Lortel Award for Outstanding Musical, with Alicia Keys.

He has worked with television networks like HBO, FX, Fox, ESPN, and Netflix. Díaz currently teaches at New York University's Gallatin School of Individualized Study. Díaz is the Head of Admissions and an associate professor at New York University Tisch School of the Arts. Diaz teaches dramatic writing and contemporary US theater. Diaz's primary focus is American plays and musicals.

Diaz has lived and worked in the New York City area, which has served as the setting for a number of his works. Diaz has credited a 1992 experience seeing John Leguizamo's Spic-o-Rama at the Westside Theater in New York City as an early influence on his work as a Latino playwright.

== Theater ==
=== Notable involvement ===
Díaz is a resident playwright for Teatro Vista, a nonprofit theater company in Chicago, Illinois. For Teatro Vista's 2008–2009 season, Díaz co-produced with Victory Gardens Theater for the world premiere of his play The Elaborate Entrance of Chad Deity. His next world premiere with Teatro Vista was The Upstairs Concierge, a farcical comedy produced by Goodman Theatre in the 2014–2015 season. Later in 2015, Díaz was the first recipient of the New Playwright Residency Program Award from Temple University and commissioned to write a play for the Department of Theater. Díaz also collaborated directly with staff and the student body, "conducting master classes for students in the MFA playwriting program and observing the work of the MFA acting students". In 2017, Díaz received a Tisch School of the Arts Dean's Faculty Grant to conduct research at the MIT Sloan Sports Analytics conference. He is recognized as an alumni playwright for New Dramatists from 2011 to 2018. In addition, Díaz co-founded the Unit Collective and is a recipient of the Jerome Fellowship, the Future Aesthetics Artist Regrant, inaugural Gail Merrifield Papp Fellowship, and the Van Lier Fellowship.

Diaz has worked at New York University's Tisch School of the Arts for almost ten years and has worked with many theaters throughout his time as a professor and director.

The theaters and theater companies with which Diaz has worked and produced various plays include The Public Theater, Dallas Theater Center, Geffen Playhouse, Center Theatre Group, The Goodman, Second Stage, Victory Gardens, Oregon Shakespeare Festival, Actors Theatre of Louisville, American Theater Company, The Atlantic, InterAct, Mixed Blood, The Orchard Project, Hip-Hop Theater Festival, The Lark, Summer Play Festival, Donmar Warehouse, and South Coast Repertory.

=== Involvement with theater during COVID-19 ===
During the time of COVID-19 lockdowns, Diaz was involved with initiatives in theatre to stage virtual performances. In collaboration with State Theatre New Jersey, Diaz made the script for his 2020 play The Bridge available for home audiences to cast and produce as part of the Play at Home project. The Bridge was one of the plays that he showed virtually during COVID, and the State Theatre had instructions and rules on how to find these plays and offered certain plays on a household Marquee to see these plays.

Also during COVID-19 shutdowns, in August 2020, Diaz collaborated on and directed a virtual reading of The Elaborate Entrance of Chad Deity with the members from the original cast, including Justin Kirk. The virtual reading was presented on Zoom.

=== Notable works ===
Díaz has written short work for The 24 Hour Plays and The 24 Hour Musicals on Broadway. He co-wrote Brink!, a full-length play featured in the Humana Festival of New American Plays in 2009. Other plays include Things With Friends, Swag (or Fucking Vigwan), #therevolution, Guernica, Rebecca Oaxaca Lays Down a Bunt, and Going Left.

Díaz's most highly awarded play is The Elaborate Entrance of Chad Deity, as it qualified him as a Pulitzer Prize finalist. The play is Diaz's most well-known, and like many of his works is set in New York City, and deals with aspects of popular culture, in this case focusing on wrestling.

Diaz wrote the full-length play Welcome to Arroyo's, a hip-hop influenced comedy-drama about a Latinx family set in New York City's Lower East Side centered on themes of gentrification, authenticity, and individual obligation to culture. The play premiered at American Theatre Company on April 15, 2010, and was directed by Jaime Castañeda. The play tells the story of a Puerto Rican family living on the Lower East Side of Manhattan. The teenage daughter, Molly, commits herself to the graffiti elements of hip-hop culture, which causes a conflict in values between her and her brother. The play is narrated by a DJ and MC chorus, who incorporate elements of hip-hop and spoken word poetry to comment on the action.

Diaz collaborated with Jon Beavers, Casey Hurt, Ian Merrigan and Ramiz Monsef on the musical The Unfortunates. Diaz was credited with adding additional materials to the war-set musical. The musical was initially produced by and developed for the Oregon Shakespeare Festival and has since been produced by the American Conservatory Theater as well. The musical was made available for theatrical licensing in 2021 with Uproar Theatrics.

Diaz wrote The Upstairs Concierge, a satirical comedy about celebrity culture following an upstairs concierge at a hotel. The play premiered in 2015 at Goodman's Owen Theatre, and was directed by KJ Sanchez, with performances by Theo Allen, Sandra Delgado, and Tawny Newsome as the titular upstairs concierge.

As the first-ever recipient of the Temple University Theatre Department's Playwright Residency Program, Diaz was commissioned to write Reggie Hoops, a full-length play initially developed in collaboration with Temple's Theatre Department to be performed during their 2016–2017 season, and premiered February 3, 2017. The play was created with the guidance of Temple's Edward Sobel, who developed the university's Playwright Residency Program.

In 2019, Diaz wrote the book for The Public Theater's Hercules, a stage adaptation of the 1997 Disney film, with music by Alan Menken, lyrics by David Zippel, and choreography by Chase Brock. The production was directed by Lear deBessonet and featured performances by Jelani Alladin as Hercules, and 1997 film cast member Roger Bart, originator of the Hercules role, as Hades.

== Awards ==
Year	Award	Category	Work	Result	Ref.
2010	Pulitzer Prize	Drama	The Elaborate Entrance of Chad Deity	Finalist	
2011	Lucille Lortel Awards	Outstanding Play	The Elaborate Entrance of Chad Deity	Won	
2011	Obie Award	Best New American Play	The Elaborate Entrance of Chad Deity	Won	
2011	The New York Times Outstanding Playwright Award		The Elaborate Entrance of Chad Deity	Won	
2015	Guggenheim Fellowship	Drama and Performance Art		Won	
2024	Lucille Lortel Awards	Outstanding Musical	Hell's Kitchen	Nominated	
2024	Tony Awards	Best Book of a Musical	Hell's Kitchen	Nominated	

== Television ==
Díaz has written series' pilots for HBO and FX and was the editor for Season 1 of GLOW, an original television show on Netflix. He adapted the Jonathan Larson musical Rent into a partially live show, Rent: Live, for Fox. For ESPN, Díaz wrote The Butt Fumble: A One-Man Play.
