= Brian Sidney Bembridge =

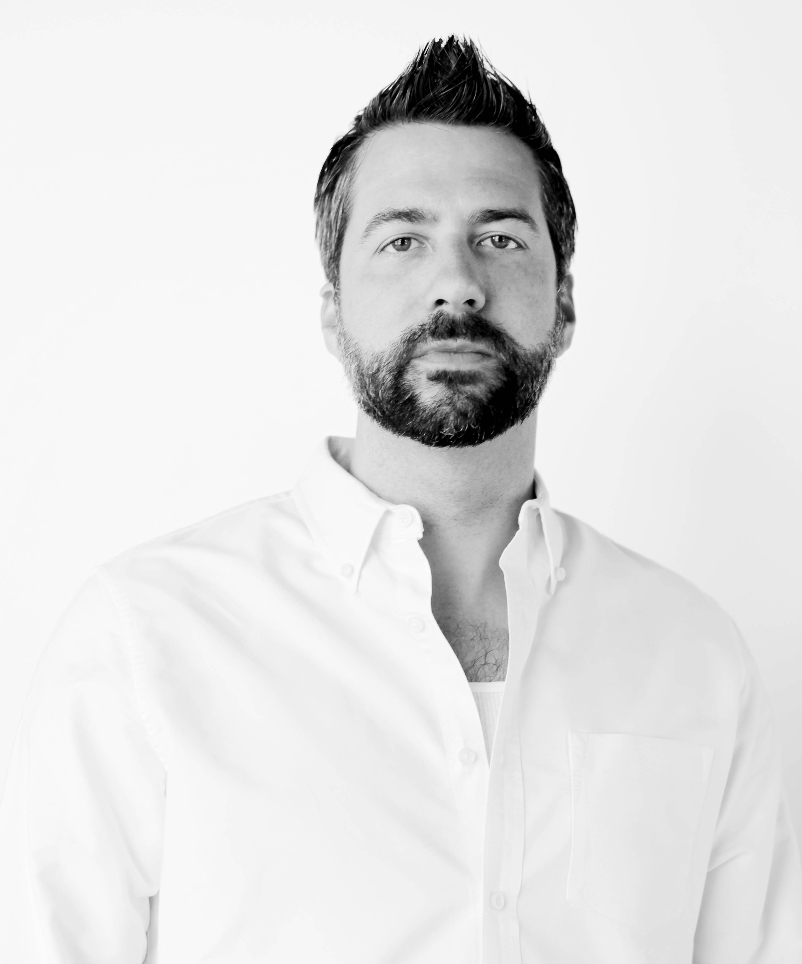

Background information
- Born: Brian Sidney Bembridge; July 18, 1973 (age 53) (United States) Lawrence, MA, USA
- Genres: Theater and Film
- Occupations: Scenic and Lighting Designer
- Years active: 1996 – Present
- Website: http://www.briansidneybembridge.com

Brian Sidney Bembridge (born 1973) is an American scenic, lighting, and costume designer for theater and film. His work has been seen on stages and screens throughout the country and Internationally in Australia, Germany, Prague, Ireland, and Great Britain. Mr. Bembridge has also taught and lectured at many universities across the country. He holds a BFA from University of North Carolina School of the Arts.

== Career ==
Bembridge has designed sets, lights, and costumes for many Off-Broadway productions and regional theaters. He has also taught and/or lectured at the Art Institute of Chicago, Northwestern University, Southern Methodist University, Webster University, the Theater School at DePaul University, Loyola University Chicago, University of North Carolina School of the Arts, and Lake Forest College.

=== Theaters ===
Mr. Bembridge's work has been seen Off Broadway at The Public Theater, Second Stage Theatre, Jean Cocteau Repertory Theatre at Bouwerie Lane Theatre, Firework Theater Company, Theatre at St Clements and The Flea Theater. Internationally his work played at Illawarra Performing Arts Centre, Platform Hip Hop Festival, Sydney, Civic Theatre, Wagga Wagga, and BMEC, Bathurst, Australia, Theatre Royal Stratford East, London, Galway Arts Festival, Ireland, Prague, Czech Republic, and on screen in Hamburg, Germany. His regional work has been seen at Steppenwolf Theatre, Goodman Theatre, California Shakespeare Theater, Chicago Shakespeare Theater, Guthrie Theater, Children's Theatre Company, Alliance Theatre, Cincinnati Playhouse in the Park, Dallas Theater Center, ACT Theatre, Geffen Playhouse, Court Theatre, Lookingglass Theatre Company (Artistic Associate), Virginia Opera, Opera Omaha, Arden Theatre Company, The Second City Chicago/Toronto, Milwaukee Repertory Theater, The Repertory Theatre of St. Louis, Asolo Repertory Theatre, Madison Repertory, Actors Theatre of Louisville, Pittsburgh Public Theater, City Theatre, Chicago Theatre, Writers Theatre (Artistic Council), Ravinia Music Festival, Circle X Theatre (Company Member), Theatre Alliance, TimeLine Theatre Company (Artistic Associate), UMA Productions (Artistic Associate), Teatro Vista (Artistic Associate), Route 66 Theater Company (Artistic Associate), Quintessence Theatre Group, About Face Theatre Company, Visceral Dance Company, Luna Negra Dance Theatre, Chicago Civic Ballet, Drury Lane Water Tower Place, Drury Lane Oakbrook Terrace, Next Theater Company, Victory Gardens, Famous Door Theater Company, The Gift Theatre, Naked Eye Theatre Company, Bailiwick Repertory, Noble Fool Theatricals, Live Bait Theater, among many others.

=== Film ===
His film work includes the production designs for Holding Out, Stray Dogs, Manfast, Wallace Shawn's Marie and Bruce, and Late for Church, and designed scenery for Muppets from Space.

== Awards ==
Mr. Bembridge has received seven Joseph Jefferson Awards, five After Dark Awards including Outstanding Season, three Los Angeles Drama Critics Circle Awards, three Back Stage West Garland Awards, two Gregory Awards, an Ovation Award and a LA Weekly Theater Award. Brian was named one of the top nine emerging designers in North America, Entertainment Design Magazine and has been featured in Live Design, Lighting Dimensions, Stage Dimensions, Stage Directions, Chicago Tribune, Chicago Sun-Times, Timeout Chicago, Chicago Social and on Chicago Public Radio.
