= Cancer (song) =

2006 song by My Chemical Romance

Song by My Chemical Romance

from the album The Black Parade
- Released: October 23, 2006
- Recorded: 2006
- Studio: Eldorado Recording (Burbank); Capitol (Hollywood) (Note: Strings)
- Genre: Emo
- Length: 2:22
- Label: Reprise
- Songwriters: Bob Bryar; Frank Iero; Ray Toro; Gerard Way; Mikey Way
- Producers: Rob Cavallo; My Chemical Romance

Audio
- "Cancer" on YouTube

"Cancer" is a song by the American rock band My Chemical Romance, released as the eighth track from their third studio album, The Black Parade (2006). A piano ballad, "Cancer" was conceived by Gerard Way and written in eight minutes by him and Rob Cavallo. The song was written by band members Bob Bryar, Frank Iero, Ray Toro, Gerard Way, and Mikey Way, and was produced by the group alongside Cavallo.

The song's lyrics focus on The Patient, the dying protagonist of The Black Parade, and depict his struggles with cancer. "Cancer" was praised by music critics for its sentimentality, though its bleakness was deemed excessive by some; nonetheless, it has been regarded as one of the best songs in the band's discography as a whole. The song has been certified gold in the United States by the Recording Industry Association of America (RIAA), and silver in the United Kingdom by the British Phonographic Industry (BPI). "Cancer" has notably been covered by American duo Twenty One Pilots in 2016.

== Background, writing, and recording ==
My Chemical Romance began writing their third studio album, The Black Parade, in early 2006 at S.I.R. Studios in New York. However, the majority of the album was written after the band moved to the Paramour Estate, a haunted mansion in Los Angeles. During the band's time there, Frank Iero recalled seeing Gerard Way in his room, "submerged" in a sheet of paper with "Cancer" written on it. Later, the band moved again to Eldorado Recording Studios to record the album. There, Gerard Way told Ray Toro that he had written a song, and Toro began to place chords onto his melody with his guitar. However, Toro realized that the song would benefit from a piano rather than a guitar, and advised Way to wait until producer Rob Cavallo arrived at the studio. The next day, Cavallo accompanied Way on the piano, following Way's instructions on how he wanted the chords to sound; according to Cavallo, the pair composed "Cancer" in eight minutes, and recorded and finalized the song half an hour later. Way later said that writing "Cancer" was "almost like an attempt to write the darkest song ever".

The band played "Cancer" during an October 2006 episode of Saturday Night Live in promotion of the album, alongside "Welcome to the Black Parade". The band continued to play "Cancer" in live shows up to 2012, but Gerard Way said in 2019 that the song was "too hard" to play following the death of their former manager, Lauren Valencia, to cancer; on May 22, 2022, the band performed "Cancer" for the first time in ten years during their reunion tour.

== Composition and lyrics ==
"Cancer" is a piano ballad with a length of two minutes and twenty-two seconds. The song is in the key of E major and is set in common time, and runs at the slow tempo of 70 beats per minute. In addition to a "melancholic" piano, the song's instrumentation consists of violins and "big and present" yet restrained drums. Sia Michel of The New York Times called "Cancer" the "unlikeliest power ballad ever", while Alternative Press instead classified the song as emo. The song has been stylistically compared to those by the Beatles, with Christopher Weingarten of The New York Times comparing it to "Let It Be" and Ed Thompson of IGN comparing it to "Fixing a Hole". Weingarten also likened "Cancer" to the Ozzy Osbourne song "So Tired", calling both songs "symphonic, string-soaked piano ballads".

Lyrically, "Cancer" takes the perspective of The Patient, the protagonist of The Black Parade whose life is flashing before his eyes as he dies. In the context of the album, "Cancer" acts as a "bridging sequence" in the middle of the album, revealing that The Patient is dying from cancer. The song takes on a first-person perspective, depicting The Patient's struggle with the disease as he bemoans his "fading appearance" and wishes to bid his family goodbye. However, Gerard Way has also said that cancer was "being used as a metaphor", and My Chemical Romance biographer Tom Bryant suggested that the song was about Way's depression, as it "crawled over him like an illness", and his relationship troubles.

== Release ==
"Cancer" was first announced as the ninth song on The Black Parade's on September 13, 2006, and was released alongside the album on October 23, 2006. The song was included on the 2008 live album and DVD The Black Parade is Dead!, which featured the final show performed on The Black Parade Tour; Sophie Bruce of the BBC noted that Gerard Way's vocals "shined brightest" on the track. On March 25, 2014, "Cancer" was released as part of May Death Never Stop You, the band's greatest hits album. The song was also released on September 23, 2016 as part of The Black Parade/Living with Ghosts, the 10th-anniversary reissue of The Black Parade. The band would later play the song live during performances of The Black Parade as a whole, including during the 2024 When We Were Young festival and the Long Live The Black Parade tour. It was certified gold by the Recording Industry Association of America (RIAA) in October 2021, and later certified silver by the British Phonographic Industry (BPI) in August 2026.

== Critical reception ==
"Cancer" received generally positive reviews from music critics, with NME writing that it "packs an emotional punch so devastating and graphic that you could never call it rock'n'roll". The song has ranked well amongst those on The Black Parade, with Mackenzie Templeton of Alternative Press ranking it fourth for the "pure honesty and vulnerability" of Gerard Way's vocals. Ariana Bacle of Entertainment Weekly ranked "Cancer" at sixth on The Black Parade, arguing that the "overtly bleak" nature of the track suited the album well. However, Tom Shepherd of Kerrang! wrote that the song's bleakness made it "not one you want to have on repeat too often", placing it at ninth on his ranking of the album. Similarly, Lauren Boisvert of American Songwriter placed the song at twelfth, calling it "hard to listen to" despite being a "masterpiece of narrative".

The song has also been deemed as one of the best in My Chemical Romance's discography as a whole, with particular praise towards its sentimentality. Guitarist Ben Bruce from Asking Alexandria declared "Cancer" his favorite song by the band, praising its sadness and calling it "very brave" to include the song within the otherwise-flamboyant album. The staff of Billboard included the song in their list of the 15 best My Chemical Romance songs, similarly lauding it as "proof that [the band] can nail a heartbreaking slower song". Andy Belt of PopMatters ranked "Cancer" as the eighth-best song by the band, calling it their "most affecting ballad", while Marianne Eloise of Louder Sound included it in her list of the 20 best songs by the band, calling it "mournful and visceral".

== Credits and personnel ==
Credits are adapted from the liner notes of The Black Parade and Apple Music.

My Chemical Romance
- Gerard Way – lead vocals, songwriter, producer
- Raymond Toro – background vocals, guitar, bass, songwriter, producer
- Frank Iero – background vocals, rhythm guitar, songwriter, producer
- Bob Bryar – drums, percussion, songwriter, producer
- Mikey Way – songwriter, producer

Additional performing artists

- Rob Cavallo – piano, producer
- Jamie Muhoberac – keyboards, synthesizer, Hammond organ
- David Campbell – string arranger

Additional personnel
- Chris Lord-Alge – mixing engineer
- Ted Jensen – mastering engineer
- Lars Fox – recording engineer
- Chris Steffen – recording engineer
- Mike Fasano – drum technician
- Andrew Busher – guitar technician
- Tyler Dragness – guitar technician
- Doug McKean – engineer
- Keith Armstrong – assistant engineer
- Jon Herroon – assistant engineer
- Jimmy Hoyson – assistant engineer

== Certifications ==
Region	Certification	Certified units/sales
United Kingdom (BPI) with "House of Wolves"	Silver	200,000^{‡}
United States (RIAA)	Gold	500,000^{‡}
^{‡} Sales+streaming figures based on certification alone.

== Twenty One Pilots version ==
"Cancer"

Promotional single by Twenty One Pilots

from the album Rock Sound Presents: The Black Parade
- Released: September 14, 2016
- Length: 3:56
- Label: Fueled by Ramen
- Songwriters: Bob Bryar; Frank Iero; Ray Toro; Gerard Way; Mikey Way
- Producer: Tyler Joseph

Twenty One Pilots promotional singles chronology
"We Don't Believe What's on TV" (2016)	"Cancer" (2016)	"Heavydirtysoul" (2016)

Lyric video
- "Cancer" (Lyric Video) on YouTube

American musical duo Twenty One Pilots recorded a cover of "Cancer" for the 2016 tribute album Rock Sound Presents: The Black Parade. The song was released as a standalone single on September 14, 2016, with an accompanying lyric video being released a day prior to the band's YouTube channel. Unlike the original song, the Twenty One Pilots cover featured electronic elements and differently-ordered verses. The song was well-received by music critics, who considered it a strong cover. "Cancer" appeared at number 91 on the Billboard Hot 100 and has been certified gold in the United States by the RIAA.

=== Background and release ===
Twenty One Pilots has been stylistically compared to My Chemical Romance, with Paul Travers of Kerrang! writing that the bands both "write their own musical and aesthetic rules" in similar fashions, and Christopher Weingarten of The New York Times noting similarities between "Cancer" and the Twenty One Pilots song "Goner". In July 2016, a video of Tyler Joseph covering "Cancer" surfaced on social media. Later, on August 8, 2016, British rock magazine Rock Sound announced Rock Sound Presents: The Black Parade, a tribute album celebrating the 10th anniversary of The Black Parade; this included the announcement of Twenty One Pilot's cover of "Cancer".

On September 13, 2016, a lyric video for "Cancer" was released to the band's YouTube channel, featuring mostly-black-and-white animated visuals such as books with lyrics written on their pages and a chessboard. The song was then released as a standalone digital single for digital download and streaming the following day.

=== Composition ===
As opposed to the original song, which was a piano ballad, the Twenty One Pilots cover of "Cancer" features synthesizers, layered vocals, and other electronic elements to lend the song a "dark" and "atmospheric" sound. The cover also shuffles around and reprises certain verses from the original song, with Gerard Way noting that the cover "almost sounds like a remix". The cover is in the key of D Major and is set in common time, with a slow tempo of 72 to 76 beats per minute.

=== Reception ===
"Cancer" received positive reviews from music critics, who considered it a strong cover. Althea Legaspi of Rolling Stone wrote that the cover "stays faithful to the already melancholic song while ratcheting up the somberness a tad." Joe DeAndrea of Billboard called "Cancer" one of the band's best covers, complimenting how "they made the track their own". Alternative Press called "Cancer" one of the best covers of a My Chemical Romance song, praising Tyler Joseph's vocals for having the "same kind of grace that he conveys on his albums". Gerard Way also praised the cover, commenting in an interview with PopBuzz that he was "really impressed" by the cover and "liked the sound" of Twenty One Pilots in general.

Commercially, "Cancer" sold 25,000 digital downloads in its first week. In the United States, the song debuted peaked at number 91 on the Billboard Hot 100 and at number 6 on the Hot Rock & Alternative Songs chart. The song also appeared at number 53 on the year-end Billboard Hot Rock & Alternative Songs chart. Outside the United States, "Cancer" charted on the Canadian Hot 100 (75), on the UK Singles chart (93), in Slovakia (96), and in the Czech Republic (99). The song also topped the Heatseekers chart in New Zealand. On February 1, 2019, "Cancer" was certified gold in the United States by the RIAA.

=== Credits and personnel ===
Credits are adapted from Apple Music.

Twenty One Pilots

- Tyler Joseph – vocals, programming, synthesizer, bass, producer
- Josh Dun – drums

My Chemical Romance

- Bob Bryar – songwriter
- Frank Iero – songwriter
- Gerard Way – songwriter
- Mikey Way – songwriter
- Raymond Toro – songwriter

=== Chart performance ===
Chart (2016)	Peak position
Canada Hot 100 (Billboard)	75
Czech Republic Singles Digital (ČNS IFPI)	99
New Zealand Heatseekers (Recorded Music NZ)	1
Slovakia Singles Digital (ČNS IFPI)	96
UK Singles (Official Charts)	93
US Billboard Hot 100	91
US Hot Rock & Alternative Songs (Billboard)	6

=== Year-end charts ===
Chart (2016)	Position
US Hot Rock & Alternative Songs (Billboard)	53

=== Certifications ===
Region	Certification	Certified units/sales
United States (RIAA)	Gold	500,000^{‡}
^{‡} Sales+streaming figures based on certification alone.
