= Mama (My Chemical Romance song) =

2006 song by My Chemical Romance featuring Liza Minnelli

Song by My Chemical Romance featuring Liza Minnelli

from the album The Black Parade
- Released: October 23, 2006
- Recorded: 2006
- Studio: Eldorado Recording, Burbank
- Genre: Punk rock; polka; gothic rock; dark cabaret
- Length: 4:39
- Label: Reprise
- Songwriters: Bob Bryar; Frank Iero; Ray Toro; Gerard Way; Mikey Way
- Producers: Rob Cavallo; My Chemical Romance

Audio
- "Mama" on YouTube

"Mama" is a song by the American rock band My Chemical Romance, released as the ninth track from their third studio album, The Black Parade (2006). A "goth cabaret" song featuring actress Liza Minnelli, "Mama" was conceived after lead guitarist Ray Toro was bet that he could not write a polka in the band's style. "Mama" was written by band members Bob Bryar, Frank Iero, Ray Toro, Gerard Way, and Mikey Way, and was produced by the group alongside Rob Cavallo.

The song's lyrics focus on The Patient, the dying protagonist of The Black Parade, and his relationship with his mother. Music critics praised "Mama" for its theatricality, its ambition, and Minnelli's appearance on the track. It is regarded as one of the best songs on the album, as well as in the band's discography as a whole. "Mama" has been certified platinum in the United States by the Recording Industry Association of America (RIAA), and silver in the United Kingdom by the British Phonographic Industry (BPI).

== Background and recording ==
My Chemical Romance began writing their third studio album, The Black Parade, in early 2006 at S.I.R. Studios in New York. During these sessions, the band bet that lead guitarist Ray Toro could not write a polka in the band's style. Inspired by the theatrical nature of the song "You Know What They Do to Guys Like Us in Prison" from their previous album Three Cheers for Sweet Revenge (2004), Toro constructed the polka instrumentation of "Mama" while Gerard Way wrote the song's melody. Later, the band played "Mama" for Rob Cavallo, who responded toward the song enthusiastically and agreed to produce The Black Parade.

"Mama" was demoed at the Paramour Estate, a haunted mansion in Los Angeles; Cavallo noted the demo of "Mama" was recorded in "a giant living room with forty-feet high ceilings and big windows overlooking Los Angeles". Afterwards, the band moved to Eldorado Recording Studios to record the album. During this period, Gerard Way wanted a "voice to ... talk back" to him in the song, and began searching for a guest vocalist who was a motherly figure, a "survivor", and "rooted in theater". Way wanted Broadway actress Liza Minnelli to feature as he frequently watched Cabaret, a movie introduced to him by his grandmother, while making The Black Parade, and wanted to give his grandmother "a nod". Upon jokingly suggesting to Cavallo that Minnelli be included, Cavallo called Minnelli's publicist and quickly convinced the actress to appear on "Mama". Minnelli performed her part in New York, while the crew remotely recorded it in Capitol Studios through a control board.

Gerard Way has declared "Mama" one of his favorite tracks on The Black Parade, alongside "Sleep". He has called working with Minnelli an "amazing experience", saying "I think she got as much of a kick out of 'Mama' as we did." Minnelli has also reacted positively towards the collaboration, telling The New York Times that the band was "so much fun, but truly professional".

== Composition and lyrics ==
"Mama" is a "hyperoperatic" and "goth cabaret" song which explores multiple movements and genres. As a whole, the song takes influence from the works of playwright Bertolt Brecht and composer Kurt Weill, particularly the song "Alabama Song" and its cover by the Doors. The song also contains elements of Pink Floyd's album The Wall, with Ed Thompson of IGN calling "Mama" an "homage" to the song "The Trial".

The song begins with the sound of exploding bombs over a polka instrumental. "Mama" then takes on a "maniacal polka-punk beat", gradually building up through "four or five increasingly agitated forms". Afterwards, Minnelli sings two lines, with her voice "sounding like [it] is coming through on an old-fashioned radio", before Gerard Way "sing[s] back at her with vicious obscenity". The song ends with a section reminiscent of a "pirate shanty", featuring vocal performances by the Way brothers' parents and Frank Iero's mother.

Lyrically, "Mama" takes the perspective of The Patient, the protagonist of The Black Parade whose life is flashing before his eyes as he dies. Framed as a letter, "Mama" sees The Patient plead his mother for forgiveness over his inadequacies as a son, while "bluntly pointing out her failures in raising him". Within the narrative of the album, Minnelli's lines are from the perspective of Mother War, the character representing The Patient's mother. However, My Chemical Romance biographer Tom Bryant suggested that "Mama" also had a more personal meaning for the band, writing that the song "was actually about alienation on tour and, deep down, sometimes just needing your mother".

== Release ==
"Mama" was first announced as the ninth song on The Black Parade on September 13, 2006, and was released alongside the album on October 23, 2006. The song was included on the 2008 live album and DVD The Black Parade Is Dead!, which featured the final show performed on The Black Parade Tour. On March 25, 2014, "Mama" was released as part of May Death Never Stop You, the band's greatest hits album. The song was also released on September 23, 2016 as part of The Black Parade/Living with Ghosts, the 10th-anniversary reissue of The Black Parade, alongside a live demo of the track. The band would later play the song live during performances of The Black Parade as a whole, including during the 2024 When We Were Young festival and the 2025 Long Live The Black Parade tour.

== Critical reception ==
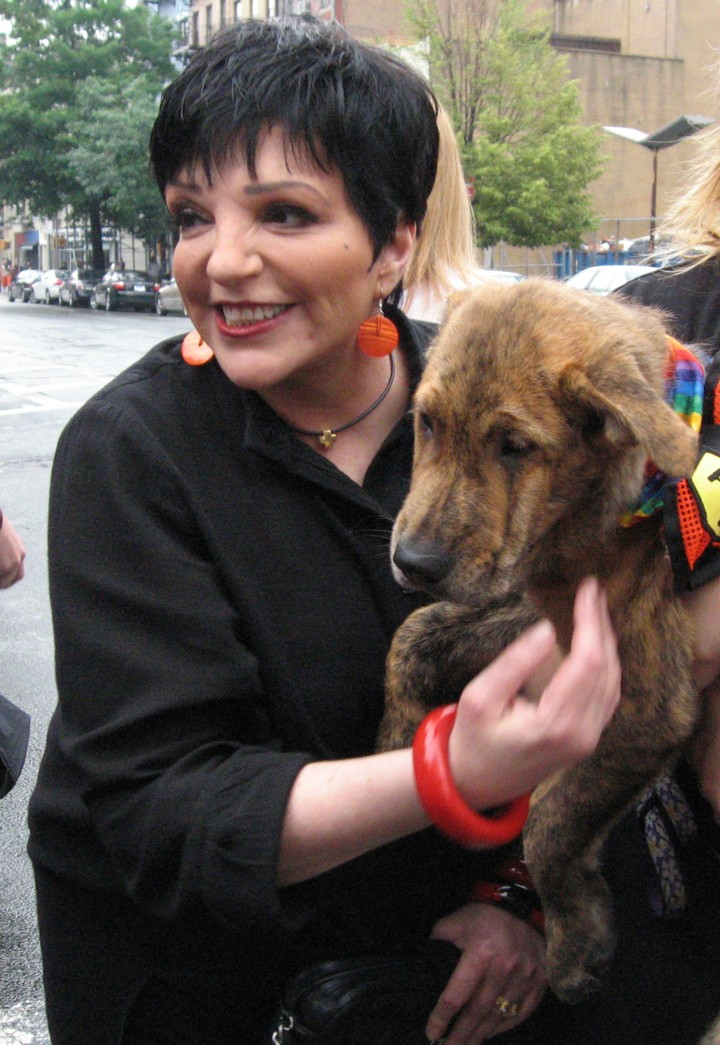
Liza Minnelli (pictured in 2006) received praise from music critics for her appearance on "Mama".

"Mama" received acclaim from music critics, with NME calling the song a "vaudeville riot that manages to out-Gogol Bordello Gogol Bordello", and has been considered a highlight in The Black Parade. Musician Deryck Whibley of the band Sum 41 called "Mama" a "stand-out track" on the album, saying he was "really impressed by the theatricality of it". Both Mackenzie Templeton of Alternative Press and Tom Shepherd of Kerrang! ranked "Mama" as the third best song on the album, with the latter writing that "perhaps no song better captures the mad ambition of The Black Parade". Ariana Bacle of Entertainment Weekly ranked "Mama" at fifth in her ranking of The Black Parade, calling it "irresistible" and praising its ambition.

The song has also been deemed as one of the best in My Chemical Romance's discography as a whole, with particular praise towards its scope, its theatrical nature, and Minnelli's appearance. The staff of Billboard included the song in their list of The 15 Best My Chemical Romance Songs, writing that it "still stands as one of the craziest and most entertaining songs" released by the band on account of its "constantly-changing musical styles" and "legendary featured guest". Margaret Farrell of Stereogum called "Mama" one of the band's 10 best songs, commending it as "one of the most theatrically intriguing MCR tracks to date". Marianne Eloise of Louder Sound included the song in her list of the band's 20 greatest songs, calling "Mama" one of the band's "weirdest" songs, yet acknowledging that "it works" due to Minnelli's "iconic" performance and the prevalence of show tunes in the band's discography. Bryant, also writing for Louder Sound, and Cassie Whitt of Loudwire ranked "Mama" as the fifth- and tenth-best song in the band's discography respectively, both praising its riskiness. Andy Belt of PopMatters ranked the song as the band's eleventh-best due to its lyrics and chorus evocative of "vintage MCR". Sam Law of Kerrang! ranked the song as the band's twelfth-best, noting that, despite "Mama" not being "the best song MCR have ever written", it "might just be the most they've ever packed into one".

== Credits and personnel ==
Credits are adapted from Apple Music.

My Chemical Romance
- Gerard Way – lead vocals, songwriter, producer
- Raymond Toro – background vocals, lead guitar, songwriter, producer
- Frank Iero – background vocals, rhythm guitar, songwriter, producer
- Mikey Way – bass guitar, songwriter, producer
- Bob Bryar – drums, percussion, songwriter, producer

Additional performing artists

- Rob Cavallo – piano, producer
- Donald James – additional vocals
- Donna Lee Way – additional vocals
- Linda Iero – additional vocals
- Liza Minnelli – vocals
- Jamie Muhoberac – synthesizer, Hammond organ, Wurlitzer piano
Additional personnel
- Chris Lord-Alge – mixing engineer
- Ted Jensen – mastering engineer
- Lars Fox – recording engineer
- Chris Steffen – recording engineer
- Mike Fasano – drum technician
- Andrew Busher – guitar technician
- Tyler Dragness – guitar technician
- Doug McKean – engineer
- Keith Armstrong – assistant mixing engineer
- Jon Herroon – assistant engineer
- Jimmy Hoyson – assistant engineer

== Certifications ==
Region	Certification	Certified units/sales
New Zealand (RMNZ)	Gold	15,000^{‡}
United Kingdom (BPI)	Silver	200,000^{‡}
United States (RIAA)	Platinum	1,000,000^{‡}
^{‡} Sales+streaming figures based on certification alone.
