= Teenagers (song) =

2007 single by My Chemical Romance

Single by My Chemical Romance

from the album The Black Parade
- Released: July 9, 2007
- Recorded: 2006
- Studio: Eldorado Recording Studios, Burbank
- Genre: Punk rock; glam rock; southern rock; emo
- Length: 2:41
- Label: Reprise
- Songwriters: Bob Bryar; Frank Iero; Ray Toro; Gerard Way; Mikey Way
- Producers: Rob Cavallo; My Chemical Romance

My Chemical Romance singles chronology
"I Don't Love You" (2007)	"Teenagers" (2007)	"Desolation Row" (2009)

Music video
- "Teenagers" on YouTube "Teenagers" (Outtake Version) on YouTube

"Teenagers" is a song by the American rock band My Chemical Romance from their third studio album, The Black Parade (2006). An "anthemic" song which has been described as punk rock, glam rock, southern rock, and emo, "Teenagers" was inspired by frontman Gerard Way's fear of teenagers, with lyrics addressing apprehension towards teenagers and teenage gun crime. The song was written by band members Bob Bryar, Frank Iero, Ray Toro, Gerard Way, and Mikey Way, and was produced by the group alongside Rob Cavallo.

The track was released as the album's fourth and final single on July 9, 2007. "Teenagers" has charted in multiple countries, including in the United States where it reached number 67 on the Billboard Hot 100 in 2007, and number 16 on the Hot Rock & Alternative Songs chart in 2019 following the announcement of the band's reunion. The track was certified six-times platinum by the Recording Industry Association of America, signifying certified sales of six million units. The single also peaked at number 9 on the UK Singles Chart, becoming one of three by the band to reach the top 10, and was certified three-times platinum by the British Phonographic Industry (BPI).

The accompanying music video for "Teenagers", directed by frequent collaborator Marc Webb, depicted the band performing in a high school gymnasium before being attacked by a horde of fans. The song has received positive reviews from music critics, who praised its catchiness and considered it a standout both on The Black Parade and in the band's discography as a whole. My Chemical Romance has included "Teenagers" on the set lists of their various live performances, including that of their reunion tour, and the track has been covered by various recording artists. "Teenagers" has also been widely used on the app TikTok, particularly in July 2022 as both a protest song against the overturning of Roe v. Wade and as part of a social media trend.

== Background and release ==
My Chemical Romance began writing their third studio album, The Black Parade, in early 2006 at S.I.R. Studios in New York. There, frontman Gerard Way expressed an interest to create an album which explored life and death, but contained his real fears "buried under layers of pomp and circumstance". "Teenagers" was conceived as part of these early sessions; Gerard Way explained in an interview with Take 40 Australia that the song was primarily written while he was riding the New York City Subway, as he found himself scared of high schoolers in a train car and began to wonder if he was out of touch with the youth.

Following the completion of The Black Parade, My Chemical Romance biographer Tom Bryant noted how certain executives at Warner Records wished for "Teenagers" to be released as the album's first single; this was ultimately rejected in favor of "Welcome to the Black Parade". The song was first announced as the eleventh song on the album on September 13, 2006, and was released alongside the album on October 23, 2006. "Teenagers" was subsequently released to American alternative radio stations on May 15, 2007, and was officially released as the album's fourth single on July 9, 2007. The song was later included on the 2008 live album and DVD The Black Parade Is Dead!, which featured the final show performed on The Black Parade Tour. The song was also included on May Death Never Stop You, the band's 2014 greatest hits album, and on The Black Parade/Living with Ghosts (2016), the 10th-anniversary reissue of The Black Parade.

== Composition and lyrics ==
"Teenagers" is an anthemic song which has been described as punk rock, glam rock, southern rock, and emo. According to sheet music published at Musicnotes.com by EMI Music Publishing, "Teenagers" is set in the key of E major and runs at a tempo of 108 beats per minute in common time. Instrumentally, the song begins with a simple guitar riff consisting of hammer-on notes and palm muting; a vibraslap can also be heard prior to each chorus. During the song's bridge, a "funky" guitar solo, described by Sam Roche of Guitar World as being "sing-along", is played. Both David Fricke of Rolling Stone and Christopher R. Weingarten of The New York Times stylistically compared "Teenagers" to songs by T. Rex, while both NME and Bryant compared it to those by Status Quo. Weingarten additionally noted how "Teenagers" seemed influenced by the Slade song "Mama Weer All Crazee Now", while NME also compared the track to those by Roxy Music.

Lyrically, "Teenagers" was inspired by Gerard Way's fear of teenagers. It is distinctive from the rest of The Black Parade in that it does not directly follow the album's overarching narrative about the death of The Patient; Way instead described the song as a "commentary on kids being viewed as meat; by the government and by society". April Prince of Alternative Press noted how the song was both a "rallying cry" for teenagers against the prejudice placed on them by adults, and commentary on how adults like Way could adopt those prejudices. Josiah Gogarty of GQ also perceived "Teenagers" as a self-referential look at the band's own teenage fanbase.

The song's lyrics also address teenage violence and gun crime. Andy Greenwald of Spin interpreted the track as Way taking the role of a military recruiter drafting teenagers, while Sia Michel of The New York Times observed how it blamed teenage violence on adults. In an interview with NME, Way brought up the Smiths song "The Headmaster Ritual", which Weingarten called a "direct lyrical influence" on "Teenagers" due to their similar lyrical depictions of violence in schools. He also acknowledged the severity of gun crime among teenagers in the United States, and explained how the track "almost didn't fit on the record, but it's a topic that's so important to our culture".

== Critical reception ==
"Teenagers" received positive reviews from music critics, who praised its sound and wit. Stephen Thomas Erlewine of AllMusic called it the best and simplest song by the band. Fricke highlighted the energy of the song's chorus, and wrote how it would have been the best song to close the album with. In a review of the single for the BBC, Fraser McAlpine gave it a five-star review, noting its upbeat sound juxtaposed against its themes of teen angst. Wren Graves of Consequence praised "Teenagers" for its "mocking humor" in a retrospective review of the album, while Entertainment Weekly's Clark Collis lauded its theatricality. Rou Reynolds of the band Enter Shikari called the song his favorite by the band due to its catchiness and lyrical content. However, Sean Howe of The Village Voice criticized the line "If you're troubled and hurt / What you got under your shirt / Will make them pay for the things that they did" for being "too Trenchcoat Mafia for comfort".

The track has performed generally well in rankings of songs on The Black Parade, with both Robert Christgau and Theon Weber of Stylus identifying "Teenagers" as a standout on the album. American Songwriter's Lauren Boisvert called the song the third-best song on The Black Parade, noting how it resonated with her both as an adult and as a teenager. Ariana Bacle of Entertainment Weekly placed "Teenagers" fourth, writing of its "confident, captivating swagger". Tom Shepherd of Kerrang! ranked the song at seventh, recognizing it as a "black sheep" on the album yet praising its themes and chorus. However, Alternative Press's Mackenzie Templeton called "Teenagers" the album's third-worst song, writing that it "didn't age as gracefully" as the other tracks on the album.

"Teenagers" has also been featured in rankings of My Chemical Romance's discography as a whole. The staff of Billboard included the track in their list of the band's 15 best songs, highlighting how many fans — being teenagers during the band's peak of popularity — began to fear teenagers themselves, thus causing the song to "slap even harder". Similarly, Louder's Marianne Eloise placed "Teenagers" in her list of the 20 greatest songs by the band due to its relatability. Margaret Farrell of Stereogum ranked it as My Chemical Romance's fourth-best song, calling it a "disturbingly fun anthem for exploited youth", while the staff of Spin included "Teenagers" in their list of their 10 best songs, noting how it served as a good break within the otherwise-dramatic album. Roche specifically lauded the track as being one of My Chemical Romance's 6 greatest guitar moments, highlighting the simplicity of its guitar riff and solo, and praised the track's "infectiously interactive" nature. A Rolling Stone list of the best songs of 2007 placed "Teenagers" at number 25, calling it the band's "catchiest and most fun song".

== Commercial performance ==
In the United States, "Teenagers" debuted at number 2 on the Bubbling Under Hot 100 Singles chart on June 23, 2007, before debuting at number 87 on the Hot 100 the following week and peaking at number 67 on August 4, 2007. The single also peaked at number 23 on the Pop Airplay chart. In 2019, following the announcement of the band's reunion, "Teenagers" debuted and peaked at number 16 on the Hot Rock & Alternative Songs chart. The Recording Industry Association of America (RIAA) certified "Teenagers" six-times platinum in the United States on July 11, 2025. In Canada, "Teenagers" reached number 53 on the Canadian Hot 100 chart on September 15, 2007, and peaked at number 21 on the Canada Rock chart; Music Canada certified "Teenagers" six-times platinum in the country on January 16, 2026.

In Europe, "Teenagers" reached number 13 on the Euro Digital Tracks chart. In the United Kingdom, the single peaked at number 9 on both the UK Singles and the UK Singles Downloads charts, becoming one of three songs by the group to reach the top 10 on the former. The song was also listed at number 87 on the UK Singles year-end chart of 2007, and was certified three-times platinum by the British Phonographic Industry (BPI). "Teenagers" has also charted on the Scottish Singles Chart (6), the Irish Singles Chart (7), the Czech Republic's Rádio – Top 100 chart (21), Austria's Ö3 Austria Top 40 chart (50), and Germany's singles chart (74). The song has been certified platinum in Austria by IFPI Austria, and gold in Italy by the Federazione Industria Musicale Italiana (FIMI), in Denmark by IFPI Danmark, and in Spain by Productores de Música de España. Additionally, "Teenagers" peaked at number 6 on New Zealand's singles chart, number 15 on Venezuela's pop rock chart, and at number 16 on Australia's singles chart. The song was certified three-times platinum in New Zealand by Recorded Music NZ. "Teenagers" has become the band's most-played song on Spotify, being their first track to surpass one billion streams on the platform in September 2024.

== Music video ==
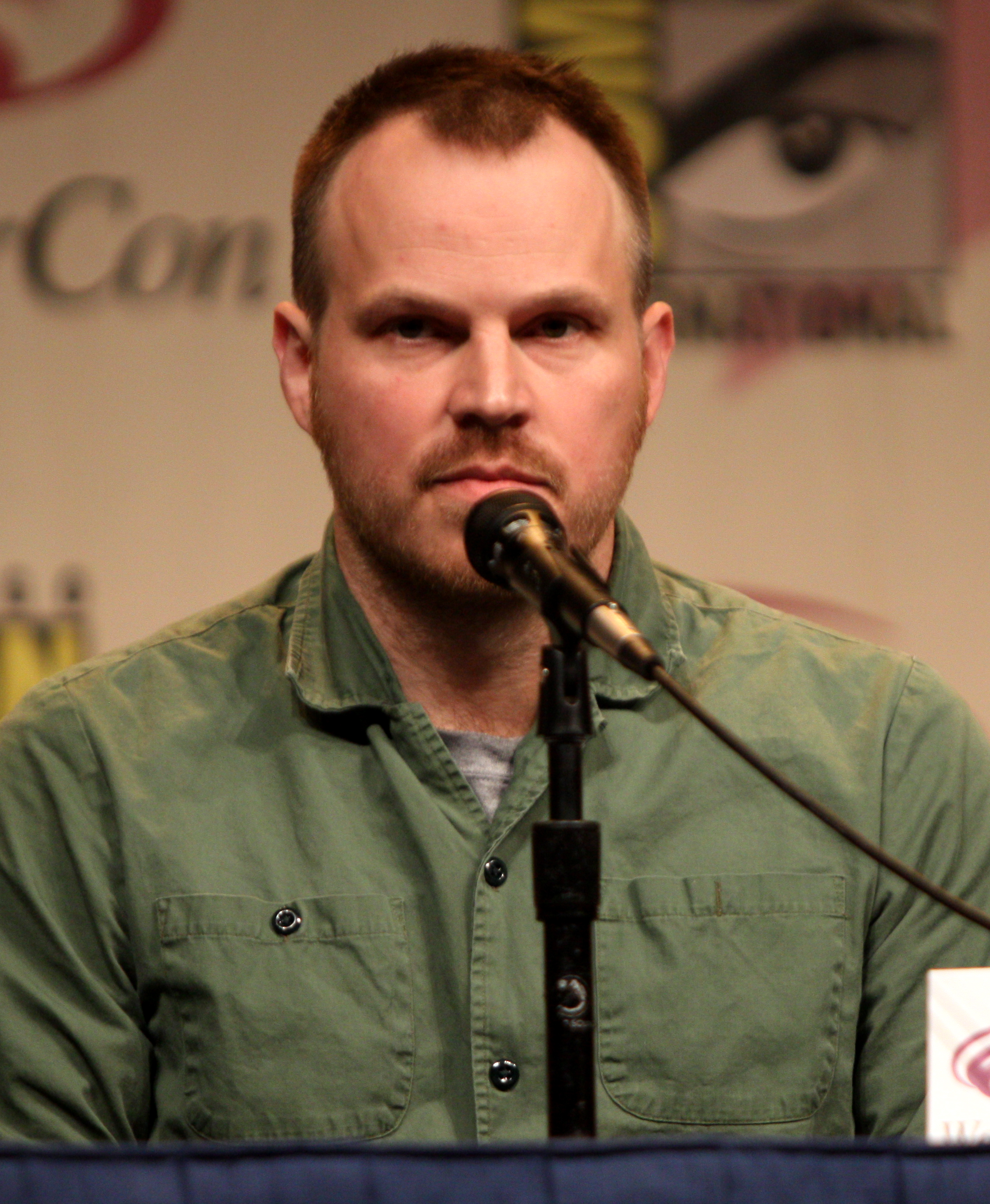
The music video of "Teenagers" was directed by Marc Webb (pictured), a frequent collaborator of the band.

An accompanying music video for "Teenagers", directed by frequent collaborator Marc Webb, was released on May 30, 2007. The video depicts the band performing the song inside a high school gymnasium to a group of teenage fans, while cheerleaders with gas masks and batons dance. The group of fans pump the air in unison, before a riot ensues and the band members are "attacked without any regard for their safety". The video ends with a message supporting National Save, a youth violence prevention organization.

The music video pays homage to the Pink Floyd film The Wall, with both containing a similar scene of teenagers breaking through a padlocked door. The video was nominated for Best Video at the 2008 NME Awards, losing to that of "Teddy Picker" by Arctic Monkeys. Aliya Chaudhry of Kerrang! ranked the music video for "Teenagers" the sixth best by the band, praising its over-the-top yet captivating nature.

== Live performances and legacy ==
"Teenagers" has been a staple in My Chemical Romance live performances, having been performed during events such as the 2007 Projekt Revolution tour, the 2007 MTV Europe Music Awards, the 10th Annual Honda Civic Tour, the 2011 Reading and Leeds Festivals, the 2022 Riot Fest and When We Were Young festivals, and the band's reunion tour. The band has also played the song in performances of The Black Parade as a whole, including during the Black Parade Tour, the 2024 When We Were Young festival, and the Long Live The Black Parade tour. Additionally, "Teenagers" has been covered by various artists, including by Palaye Royale in live performances, Macy Gray, Save Face, and Against the Current for the compilation album Rock Sound Presents: The Black Parade.

Prior to July 2022, "Teenagers" had been used by some TikTok users to soundtrack videos of politically active members of Generation Z. The track was also adopted by parents on the platform, who used it in videos of rebellious actions taken by their teenage children. In July 2022, "Teenagers" saw a significant renewal in popularity on the app due to a trend where users would post pictures of their parents as teenagers, followed by popularity as a protest song used by Generation Z after the overturning of Roe v. Wade.

== Credits and personnel ==
Credits are adapted from the liner notes of The Black Parade and Apple Music.

Locations

- Recorded at Eldorado Recording Studios (Burbank, California)
- Mixed at Resonate Music (Burbank, California)
- Mastered at Sterling Sound (New York City, New York)

Credits

My Chemical Romance
- Gerard Way – lead vocals, songwriter, producer
- Raymond Toro – background vocals, lead guitar, songwriter, producer
- Frank Iero – background vocals, rhythm guitar, songwriter, producer
- Mikey Way – bass guitar, songwriter, producer
- Bob Bryar – drums, percussion, songwriter, producer

Additional performing artists

- Rob Cavallo – piano, producer
- Jamie Muhoberac – keyboards, synthesizer, Hammond organ, Wurlitzer piano
Additional personnel
- Chris Lord-Alge – mixing engineer
- Ted Jensen – mastering engineer
- Lars Fox – recording engineer
- Chris Steffen – recording engineer
- Mike Fasano – drum technician
- Andrew Busher – guitar technician
- Tyler Dragness – guitar technician
- Doug McKean – engineer
- Keith Armstrong – assistant engineer

== Charts ==
=== Weekly charts ===
2007–2008 weekly chart positions for "Teenagers"
Chart (2007–2008)	Peak position
Australia (ARIA)	16
Austria (Ö3 Austria Top 40)	50
Canada Hot 100 (Billboard)	53
Canada Rock (Billboard)	21
Czech Republic Airplay (ČNS IFPI)	21
Euro Digital Tracks (Billboard)	13
Finland Airplay (Radiosoittolista)	20
Germany (GfK)	74
Ireland (IRMA)	7
New Zealand (Recorded Music NZ)	6
Scottish Singles Sales (Official Charts)	6
UK Singles (Official Charts)	9
UK Airplay (Music Week)	14
UK Singles Downloads (Official Charts)	9
US Billboard Hot 100	67
US Pop Airplay (Billboard)	23
Venezuela Pop Rock (Record Report)	15

2019 weekly chart positions for "Teenagers"
Chart (2019)	Peak position
US Hot Rock & Alternative Songs (Billboard)	16

=== Year-end charts ===
2007 year-end chart positions for "Teenagers"
Chart (2007)	Position
Australia (ARIA)	65
New Zealand (Recorded Music NZ)	35
UK Singles (OCC)	87

== Certifications ==
Region	Certification	Certified units/sales
Austria (IFPI Austria)	Platinum	30,000^{*}
Canada (Music Canada)	6× Platinum	480,000^{‡}
Denmark (IFPI Danmark)	Gold	45,000^{‡}
Italy (FIMI)	Gold	50,000^{‡}
New Zealand (RMNZ)	4× Platinum	120,000^{‡}
Spain (Promusicae)	Gold	30,000^{‡}
United Kingdom (BPI)	3× Platinum	1,800,000^{‡}
United States (RIAA)	6× Platinum	6,000,000^{‡}
^{*} Sales figures based on certification alone.^{‡} Sales+streaming figures based on certification alone.

== Release history ==
Region	Date	Format	Label(s)	Ref.
United States	May 15, 2007	Alternative radio	Reprise	
United Kingdom	July 9, 2007	CD single	Warner	
Various	July 30, 2007	Digital extended play (EP)	Reprise; Warner	
Australia	August 31, 2007	CD single	Warner	
Germany	September 14, 2007	CD single	Warner	

== See also ==
- Ephebiphobia
