= Dead! (song) =

2006 song by My Chemical Romance

Song by My Chemical Romance

from the album The Black Parade
- Released: October 23, 2006
- Genre: Pop-punk
- Length: 3:15
- Label: Reprise
- Songwriters: Bob Bryar; Frank Iero; Ray Toro; Gerard Way; Mikey Way
- Producers: Rob Cavallo; My Chemical Romance

Audio
- "Dead!" on YouTube

"Dead!" is a song by the American rock band My Chemical Romance from their third studio album The Black Parade (2006). A pop-punk song, "Dead!" was originally created while the band was touring for their previous album, Three Cheers for Sweet Revenge (2004), as part of a side project that was never meant to be released. The song was originally created as a result of criticism towards the band, making fun of those who felt the band would not succeed at the time. It was finished in early 2006 while the band was creating The Black Parade, with the final version of the song being produced by the band alongside Rob Cavallo.

Within the context of the album, "Dead!" focuses on the central character, the Patient, as he reaches the end of his life. The song takes this idea of death and interprets it in a sarcastic, upbeat manner; it utilizes dark humor and features several guitar solos, as well as a horn section. The songs composition was inspired by Electric Light Orchestra's "Mr. Blue Sky" and Cheap Trick's "I Want You To Want Me". "Dead!" was well received by critics, who considered it among the best songs from The Black Parade, as well as one of the band's best songs. It has been certified gold by the RIAA, and certified silver by the BPI.

== Background and production ==
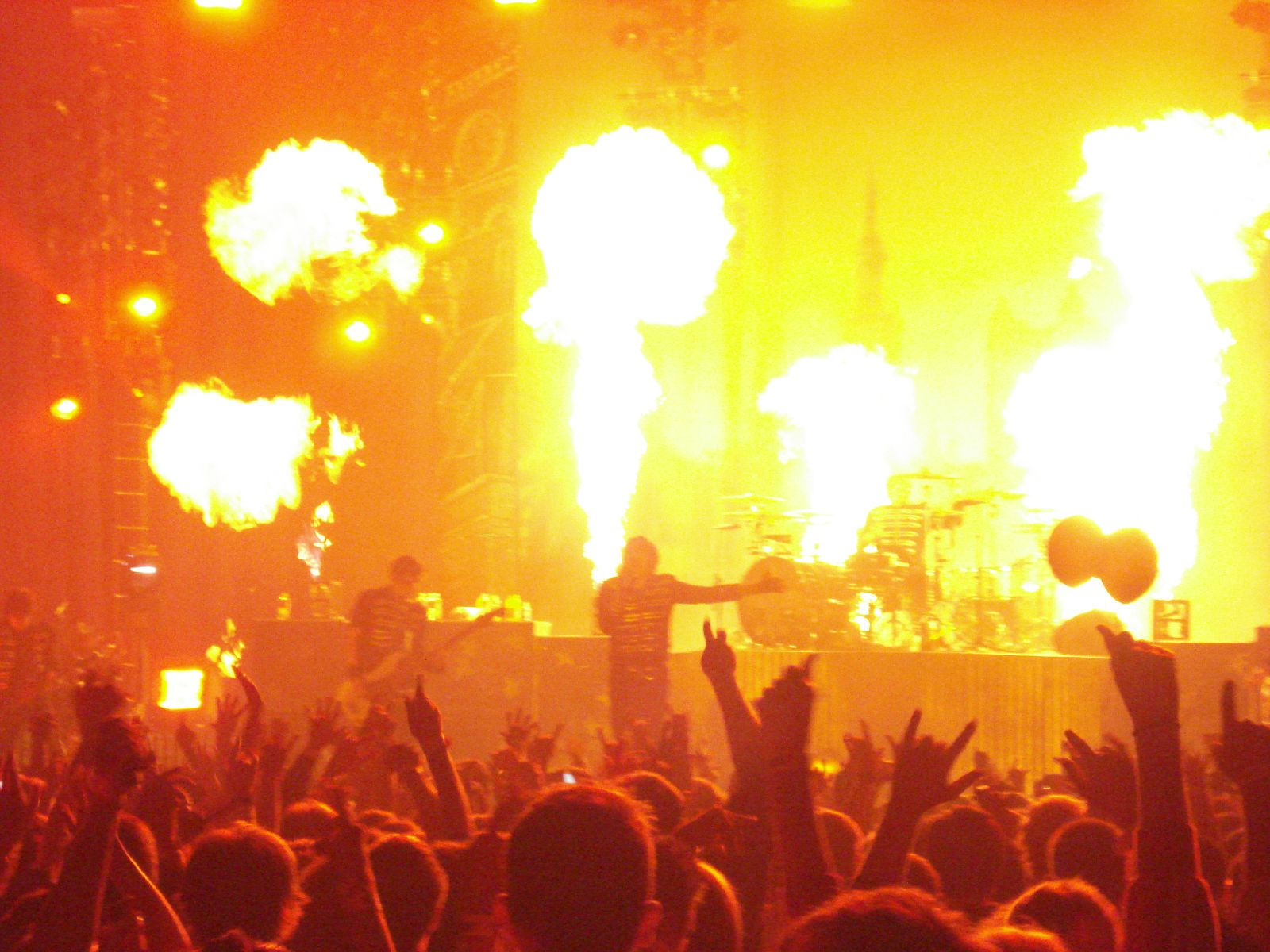
My Chemical Romance performing in 2007

While touring for their second studio album, Three Cheers for Sweet Revenge (2004), My Chemical Romance wrote and recorded demos for several songs in their tour bus's makeshift studio. Gerard Way referred to these demo recordings as "Cheers part two", a side project the band initially had no plans of releasing. These demo recordings included an early version of "Dead!". In early 2006, the band began going through the material they had written while touring, and while positively viewing their work, felt that it wasn't ambitious enough. They then went to S.I.R. Studios in New York City to begin writing their third studio album, The Black Parade (2006), and finished work on their original bus demos. This included "Dead!", which by that point was largely completed.

"Dead!" was written as a commentary on the criticism towards the band. At the time of writing the song, the band repeatedly faced criticism from the general public, inspiring the band to write "Dead!" as a song that on the idea of being dead and people not caring. The band described writing the song as them stating "here we are, and we’re better. Here we are and we’re more daring and more defiant than ever". When creating the song, the band was musically inspired by the Electric Light Orchestra's "Mr. Blue Sky" and Cheap Trick's "I Want You To Want Me". The song's horn section was a result of the band's Frank Iero experimenting with a tuba while recording. The band produced the final song with Rob Cavallo.

== Composition and lyrics ==
"Dead!" is a pop-punk song that is three minutes and fifteen seconds long. It is the first full song in the album after the introductory track "The End." The song begins with a flatlining heart rate monitor, making a transition from the abrupt conclusion of "The End." and the beeping monitor sound it features. before cutting into a "pyrotechnic" guitar section. The song features several guitar solos, as well as a horn section during its bridge. NME found the song to be similar to "Holiday", a song from Green Day's American Idiot (2004), while The New York Times found some parts of the song to be similar to "Maxwell's Silver Hammer" by the Beatles.

Within the context of The Black Parade, the song is about the album's central character, the Patient, as he reaches the end of his life. The song takes this idea of death and then interprets it in a sarcastic, cheerful manner. Billboard described Gerard Way's singing in the song as "milking every syllable with a fiendish glee". The song's chorus starts with the lyric "Have you heard the news that you're dead?", and other lyrics from the song incorporate dark humor ("No one ever had much nice to say / I think they never liked you anyway"). When The Black Parade first released, The Daily Mail believed My Chemical Romance was initiating a "cult of emo", resulting in widespread hatred towards the band. At that time, "Dead!" was often highlighted as a song that many believed encouraged its listeners to commit suicide.

== Release ==
The Black Parade was released on October 23, 2006 through Reprise Records; "Dead!" is the second song on the track list. The song was included on the 2008 live album and DVD The Black Parade is Dead!, which featured the final show performed on The Black Parade Tour. The song was also released as part of The Black Parade/Living with Ghosts, the 10th-anniversary reissue of The Black Parade, on September 23, 2016. The song was also available for the Xbox 360 version of Guitar Hero II (2006). The song received a gold certification from the Recording Industry Association of America (RIAA) in October 2021, and a silver certification from the British Phonographic Industry (BPI) in January 2023.

== Critical reception ==
Entertainment Weekly's Ariana Bacle and Mackenzie Templeton of Alternative Press both ranked the song as the second best from The Black Parade. Bacle wrote that the song was "spectacularly fun and darkly funny" for a song about dying, and described the song as My Chemical Romance "rejecting" the title as an emo band. Templeton highlighted the song's introductory guitar segment, and the transition between "The End." and "Dead!". Cassie Whitt of Loudwire described the song as "three minutes of OTT pop-punk glory" that highlighted the band's "scrappy punk upbringing" as well as the style of music that defined The Black Parade. She also highlighted Ray Toro and Frank Iero's guitar solos.

The editorial team of Billboard shared similar thoughts as Whitt, highlighting Toro's work, while also describing Gerard Way's performance as "some of his best work as a frontman". They further wrote that if The Black Parade was an album about dying, then "Dead!" was a "bullet straight to the heart". Similarly, Marianne Eloise of Louder described Way's performance in the song as "unforgettable". Sam Law of Kerrang! described the song as "full of life", built around "defiance" instead of depression. Eloise and Whitt ranked the song as the 11th and 14th best song in the band's discography respectively, while Law placed it at sixth and Billboard staff ranked it third.

== Personnel ==
Personnel are taken from iTunes.

- Gerard Way – lead vocals
- Rob Cavallo – piano
- Michael James Way – bass
- Raymond Toro – background vocals, lead guitar
- Jamie Muhoberac – synthesizer, Hammond organ, Wurlitzer piano
- Frank Iero – rhythm guitar, background vocals
- Bob Bryar – drums

== Certifications ==
Region	Certification	Certified units/sales
United Kingdom (BPI)	Silver	200,000^{‡}
United States (RIAA)	Gold	500,000^{‡}
^{‡} Sales+streaming figures based on certification alone.
