= The Black Parade Is Dead! =

2007 live album by My Chemical Romance

Live album by My Chemical Romance
- Released: June 27, 2008
- Recorded: October 7 and 24, 2007
- Venues: Palacio de los Deportes (Mexico City); Maxwell's (Hoboken)
- Length: 56:15 (CD); 124:31 (DVD)
- Label: Reprise

My Chemical Romance chronology
| The Black Parade (2006) | The Black Parade Is Dead! (2008) | Danger Days: The True Lives of the Fabulous Killjoys (2010) |

The Black Parade Is Dead! is a live album by the American rock band My Chemical Romance, released on June 27, 2008 through Reprise Records. Featuring a CD and a DVD, the release includes live recordings of two performances from the band's Black Parade World Tour, in support of their third studio album The Black Parade (2006).

These performances include their finale as the "Black Parade" alter-ego band at the Palacio de los Deportes in Mexico City, and a later performance at Maxwell's in Hoboken, New Jersey. The Mexico City performance portion of the release only features The Black Parade, while the Maxwell's performance features a more varied track list of material from that album and their previous works, including a previously unreleased song which has been retroactively named "Someone Out There Loves You" by lead singer Gerard Way.

The album received positive reviews from critics. Many believed that the album was a good release for fans of the band, and some believed that it represented The Black Parade and the band at its best. However, others were critical about whether the concept of The Black Parade was overdone, and felt that the live performances were unable to retain a similar level of quality as the original album. The album charted in several countries, and has been certified gold by the Recording Industry Association of America, the British Phonographic Industry, and Recorded Music NZ.

== Background and release ==
My Chemical Romance released their third studio album, The Black Parade, on October 23, 2006, through Reprise Records. It is a concept album about a man dying from cancer, known as "the Patient", who reflects upon his life as he nears his death, which is presented to him in the form of his fondest childhood memory: seeing a marching band. On The Black Parade World Tour, the band performed the entire album in the persona of an alter ego band, known as the "Black Parade". They played as the Black Parade alter-ego until October 7, 2007, when the alter-ego was killed off at their performance at the Palacio de los Deportes in Mexico City. Their performances as the Black Parade were noted for their "theatrical"-styled production, featuring elaborate stage designs and elements like pyrotechnics that would go off during certain songs.

The band's performance at the Palacio de los Deportes was recorded, and released as The Black Parade Is Dead! live album on June 27, 2008. The release features both a CD and a DVD; the CD features the recordings of their performance in Mexico City, while the DVD features the live footage of that performance as well as one of their later performances at Maxwell's in Hoboken, New Jersey. As part of a fan competition, the band created a limited-edition version of the album. It featured three masks themed around imagery based on the Day of the Dead, three downloadable live recordings, and faux death certificates for each member of the band. They released the full footage from the DVD onto YouTube in 2019. That year, the live recording was released on vinyl as part of Record Store Day.

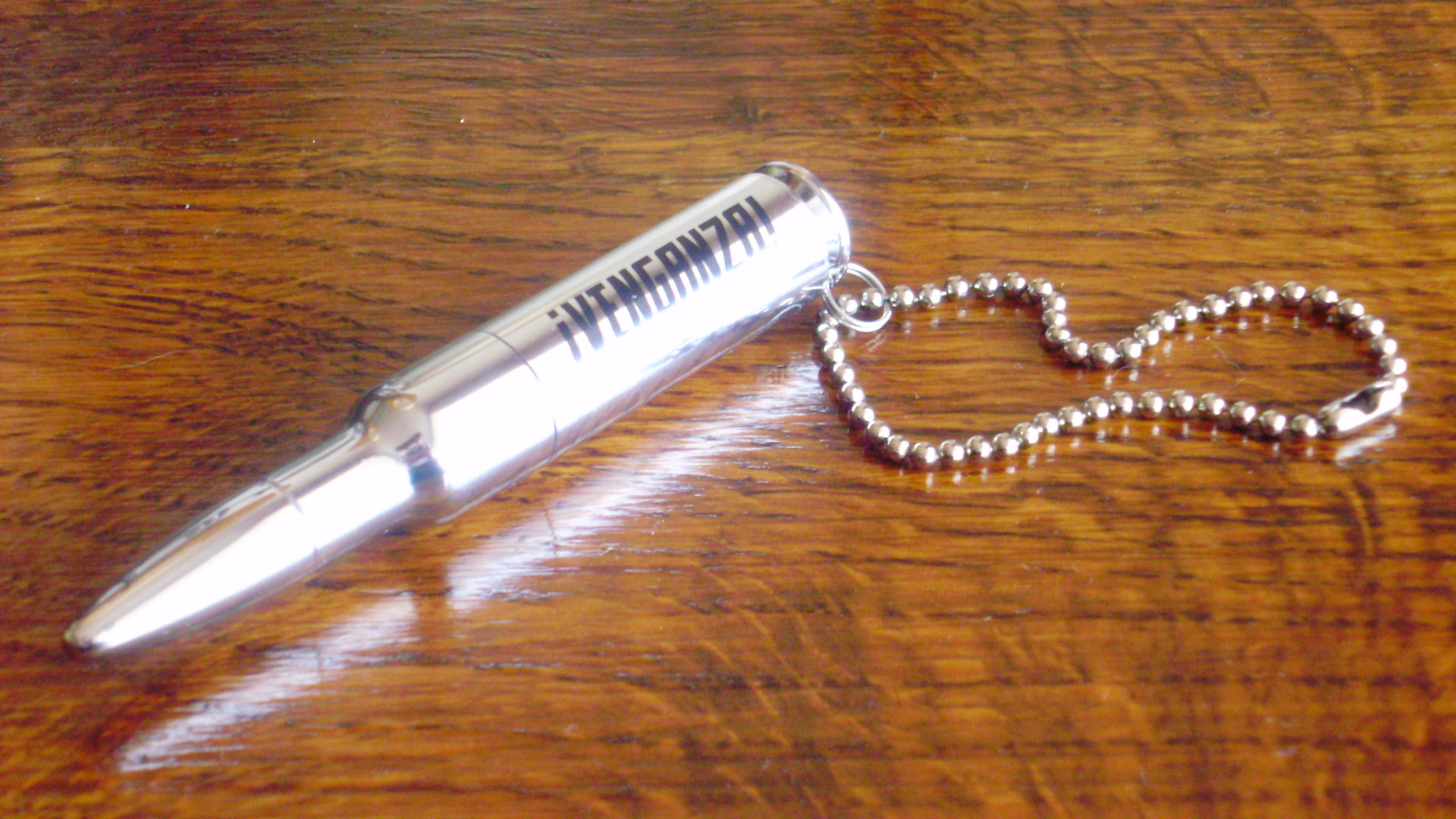
The USB flash drive that ¡Venganza! was released on.

During the Black Parade World Tour, each performance where the band played as The Black Parade would be followed by them returning to the stage to play an assortment of songs from their earlier albums. While this also occurred at the band's performance in Mexico City, the footage was excluded from The Black Parade Is Dead! and instead released as ¡Venganza! on March 31, 2009. The release came in the form of a USB flash drive in the shape of a bullet and was limited to only 5,000 copies. It has since been considered a collector's item.

== Content ==
My Chemical Romance performing as The Black Parade in 2007

The Black Parade Is Dead! features two discs: a CD containing the live recordings of the band's Mexico City performance, and a DVD with footage of that performance and their later one at Maxwell's. The full track list of the CD is the same as that of The Black Parade, but played live and with one new track added, "The Black Parade Is Dead!", where lead singer Gerard Way announces to the audience that that performance would be the Black Parade's last.

The tracklist of the Maxwell's performance is more varied, with only about half of it being songs from The Black Parade and the rest of it consisting of live performances of their other material. It additionally features a live performance of a song that is referred to as simply "Untitled" on the tracklist, but has retroactively been named "Someone Out There Loves You" by Way. A demo or complete version of the song was never recorded, making the version of the song present on The Black Parade Is Dead! the only surviving version of the song.

== Critical reception ==
Professional ratings
Review scores
| Source | Rating |
|---|---|
| AllMusic | 3.5/5 stars |
| BBC | (positive) |
| IGN | 8.6/10 |
| Rolling Stone | 2/5 stars |
| Thrash Hits | 6/6 stars |
| Sputnikmusic | 3.5/5 |

Sophie Bruce of BBC Music wrote that the album demonstrated how My Chemical Romance was the "perfect live band", and that the album was "a must-have" for fans who were unable to see them live. Anne Waites of Thrash Hits shared a similar opinion, giving the album a perfect rating and claiming that it demonstrated the "power they wield in the lowliest of circumstances", in reference to the quality of songs from The Black Parade even without the "bells and whistles". IGN's Ed Thompson wrote that The Black Parade Is Dead! was better than the original album, stating that the live performances gave it an "extra dose of the excess that made the studio album so good in the first place".

Some reviews felt that the concept of The Black Parade was overdone with the release of the live album, and ambitious to the point of being detrimental to the original album. Kyle Anderson of Rolling Stone wrote that The Black Parade's ambitious production and instrumentals did not translate well into live performances, commenting that the recordings lacked the amount of energy present on the original album. Heather Phares of AllMusic wrote that, although the performances and content featured on the album could come off as "overdone", she considered it an appropriate conclusion to The Black Parade—particularly for fans of the album.

A reviewer at Sputnikmusic praised the album's production and recording quality, saying that "everything is clear", and that the "variety of camera angles provided is more than sufficient". He further highlighted the Maxwell's performance footage, which he believed "excellently capture" the atmosphere and energy of the show, and that viewers could feel getting "knocked around by the predictably enthusiastic audience".

== Commercial performance ==
In the United States, The Black Parade Is Dead! reached number 22 on the Billboard 200 chart. In the United Kingdom, it reached number 12, and in New Zealand, the album reached number 6. Elsewhere, the album reached number 10 in Australia, number 19 in Ireland, number 21 in Canada, number 24 in Austria, number 29 in Sweden, and number 40 in Portugal. It also reached number 51 and number 120 in Germany and France, respectively. The album has been certified gold by the Recording Industry Association of America, British Phonographic Industry and Recorded Music NZ.

== Personnel ==
My Chemical Romance

- Bob Bryar – drums
- Frank Iero – rhythm guitar, backing vocals
- Ray Toro – lead guitar, backing vocals
- Gerard Way – lead vocals
- Mikey Way – bass

Additional musicians

- James Dewees – keyboards, percussion, backing vocals
- Matt Cortez – acoustic guitar

Production

- Atom Rothlein – director
- Jennifer Destiny Rothlein – producer
- Devin Sarno – executive producer
- Kelly Norris Sarno – executive producer

== Track listing ==
=== CD and vinyl ===
From the Palacio de los Deportes in Mexico City, Mexico on October 7, 2007
| No. | Title | Length |
|---|---|---|
| 1. | "The End." | 2:34 |
| 2. | "Dead!" | 3:17 |
| 3. | "This Is How I Disappear" | 3:51 |
| 4. | "The Sharpest Lives" | 3:18 |
| 5. | "Welcome to the Black Parade" | 5:06 |
| 6. | "I Don't Love You" | 3:47 |
| 7. | "House of Wolves" | 3:38 |
| 8. | "Interlude" | 1:01 |
| 9. | "Cancer" | 3:17 |
| 10. | "Mama" | 5:21 |
| 11. | "Sleep" | 5:31 |
| 12. | "Teenagers" | 3:04 |
| 13. | "The Black Parade Is Dead!" | 1:01 |
| 14. | "Disenchanted" | 4:59 |
| 15. | "Famous Last Words" | 5:10 |
| 16. | "Blood" (studio recording) | 1:22 |
| Total length: | | 56:15 |

Vinyl edition bonus tracks
| No. | Title | Length |
|---|---|---|
| 17. | "Kill All Your Friends" (studio recording) | 4:28 |
| 18. | "My Way Home Is Through You" (studio recording) | 2:58 |
| 19. | "Heaven Help Us" (studio recording) | 2:55 |
| Total length: | | 65:56 |

=== DVD ===
From the Palacio de los Deportes in Mexico City, Mexico on October 7, 2007
| No. | Title | Length |
|---|---|---|
| 1. | "The End." | 2:34 |
| 2. | "Dead!" | 3:17 |
| 3. | "This Is How I Disappear" | 3:51 |
| 4. | "The Sharpest Lives" | 3:18 |
| 5. | "Welcome to the Black Parade" | 5:06 |
| 6. | "I Don't Love You" | 3:47 |
| 7. | "House of Wolves" | 3:38 |
| 8. | "Interlude" | 1:01 |
| 9. | "Cancer" | 3:17 |
| 10. | "Mama" | 5:21 |
| 11. | "Sleep" | 5:31 |
| 12. | "Teenagers" | 3:04 |
| 13. | "The Black Parade Is Dead!" | 1:01 |
| 14. | "Disenchanted" | 4:59 |
| 15. | "Famous Last Words" | 5:10 |
| 16. | "Blood" (studio recording) | 1:22 |
| Total length: | | 56:15 |

From Maxwell's in Hoboken, New Jersey, on October 24, 2007
| No. | Title | Length |
|---|---|---|
| 1. | "Welcome to the Black Parade" | 5:11 |
| 2. | "Thank You for the Venom" | 4:23 |
| 3. | "Dead!" | 5:05 |
| 4. | "The Sharpest Lives" | 4:40 |
| 5. | "This Is How I Disappear" | 3:53 |
| 6. | "Teenagers" | 4:07 |
| 7. | "I'm Not Okay (I Promise)" | 4:05 |
| 8. | "You Know What They Do to Guys Like Us in Prison" | 4:04 |
| 9. | "Famous Last Words" | 5:08 |
| 10. | "Give 'Em Hell, Kid" | 2:45 |
| 11. | "House of Wolves" | 3:42 |
| 12. | "It's Not a Fashion Statement, It's a Fucking Deathwish" | 4:38 |
| 13. | "I Don't Love You" | 4:27 |
| 14. | Untitled | 4:19 |
| 15. | "Mama" | 4:45 |
| 16. | "Helena" | 4:54 |
| 17. | "Cancer" | 2:46 |
| Total length: | | 68:16 |

== Charts ==
2008 chart performance for the album
| Chart (2008) | Peak position |
|---|---|
| Australian Albums (ARIA) | 10 |
| Austrian Albums (Ö3 Austria) | 24 |
| Canadian Albums (Billboard) | 21 |
| Czech Albums (ČNS IFPI) | 35 |
| European Albums (Billboard) | 25 |
| French Albums (SNEP) | 120 |
| German Albums (Offizielle Top 100) | 51 |
| Irish Albums (IRMA) | 19 |
| Italian Albums (FIMI) | 62 |
| Japanese Albums (Oricon) | 52 |
| Mexican Albums (Top 100 Mexico) | 9 |
| New Zealand Albums (RMNZ) | 6 |
| Portuguese Albums (AFP) | 40 |
| Scottish Albums (Official Charts) | 13 |
| Spanish Albums (Promusicae) | 78 |
| Swedish Albums (Sverigetopplistan) | 29 |
| UK Albums (Official Charts) | 12 |
| UK Rock & Metal Albums (Official Charts) | 1 |
| US Billboard 200 | 22 |
| US Top Alternative Albums (Billboard) | 7 |
| US Top Rock Albums (Billboard) | 10 |

2008 chart performance for the video
| Chart (2008) | Peak position |
|---|---|
| Australian Music DVD (ARIA) | 3 |
| New Zealand Music DVD (RIANZ) | 2 |

2020 chart performance for the album
| Chart (2020) | Peak position |
|---|---|
| Croatian International Albums (HDU) | 26 |

== Certifications ==
Certifications and sales
| Region | Certification | Certified units/sales |
|---|---|---|
| New Zealand (RMNZ) album | Gold | 7,500^{‡} |
| United Kingdom (BPI) album | Silver | 60,000^{‡} |
| United States (RIAA) video | Gold | 50,000^{^} |
^{^} Shipments figures based on certification alone.^{‡} Sales+streaming figures based on certification alone.
