= Famous Last Words (My Chemical Romance song) =

2007 single by My Chemical Romance

Single by My Chemical Romance

from the album The Black Parade
- B-side: "My Way Home Is Through You"; "Kill All Your Friends"
- Released: January 22, 2007
- Studio: Eldorado Recording Studios, Burbank
- Genre: Hard rock; emo; pop
- Length: 4:59
- Label: Reprise
- Songwriters: Bob Bryar; Frank Iero; Ray Toro; Gerard Way; Mikey Way
- Producers: Rob Cavallo; My Chemical Romance

My Chemical Romance singles chronology
"Welcome to the Black Parade" (2006)	"Famous Last Words" (2007)	"I Don't Love You" (2007)

Music video
- "Famous Last Words" on YouTube "Famous Last Words" (Outtake Version) on YouTube

"Famous Last Words" is a song by the American rock band My Chemical Romance from their third studio album, The Black Parade (2006). Originally titled "The Saddest Music in the World", the track was written by the band following Mikey Way's premature departure from the album's writing sessions due to mental health issues. While the lyrics were initially about Gerard Way's criticisms of Mikey's decision, they eventually broadened out to be about the band as a whole, and took on themes of optimism and making the most out of life. Compositionally, "Famous Last Words" is an upbeat hard rock, emo and pop song. It was written by band members Bob Bryar, Frank Iero, Ray Toro, Gerard Way, and Mikey Way, and was produced by the group alongside Rob Cavallo.

"Famous Last Words" was initially released as the last song on The Black Parade, and was officially released as the album's second single on January 22, 2007. The single has charted in multiple countries, including in the United Kingdom where it topped the UK Rock & Metal Singles Chart and reached number 8 on the UK singles chart. It was certified platinum by the British Phonographic Industry (BPI) in 2025. "Famous Last Words" also charted in the United States, where it reached number 4 on the Alternative Airplay chart and number 88 on the Billboard Hot 100. In 2025, it was certified as two-times platinum by the Recording Industry Association of America (RIAA). The track has also been certified platinum by Recorded Music NZ (RMNZ).

A music video for "Famous Last Words" was released on January 11, 2007. Recorded directly after the one for "Welcome to the Black Parade", it features the band performing the track while the set burns down around them. The track received generally positive reviews from music critics, and has been identified as a standout on both The Black Parade and in the band's discography as a whole. "Famous Last Words" was included on the setlist of the Black Parade World Tour, the band's 2007–2008 concert tour in support of The Black Parade, and has been featured in multiple later live performances.

== Background and writing ==
My Chemical Romance began work on their third studio album, The Black Parade, in early 2006 at S.I.R. Studios in New York. The band's lead singer Gerard Way aimed to create an album centered around life and death. He eventually came up with idea of a concept album centered around a man dying of cancer, known as the Patient, as he nears the end of his life. Death then presents itself to the Patient in the form of his fondest childhood memory: his father taking him to see a marching band when he was a child.

During the album's development, the band went to the Paramour Mansion to record part of the album. The band considered the mansion scary and felt uneasy within it; all of the band members believed that the nature of the mansion "bled" into the sound of the music itself and left a significant impact on them all. In particular, Mikey Way, the band's bassist and Gerard Way's brother, developed depression and alcoholism from living within the mansion, exacerbated by his preexisting anxiety. Ultimately, with the support of the band, he left the mansion and sessions temporarily to seek medical advice.

Right away I felt like I was singing about the thing I was most afraid of [...] It felt like what it meant to be in this band, it felt like it was about Mikey, and it felt like it was about our lives, thinking of yourself as despicable or hated.

— Gerard Way on the meaning of "Famous Last Words"

Around this time, Ray Toro, the band's guitarist, began to construct a song titled "The Saddest Music in the World". Subsequently, Gerard Way joined Toro in writing the song; inspired by his brother leaving the recording sessions, the lyrics saw Gerard criticizing his brother's decision to leave the mansion. As the writing process went on, the remaining band members at the Paramour Mansion joined in, and "The Saddest Music in the World" shifted from being about Mikey Way to one about the band in general. The song's chorus was constructed late in the process; Toro recalled that it was written in an hour when Gerard Way was alone in the studio. The final song, renamed "Famous Last Words", was produced by the band alongside Rob Cavallo. All five band members are credited as writers on the song.

== Composition and lyrics ==
"Famous Last Words" is an upbeat and anthemic hard rock, emo, and pop song, with elements of stadium rock and post-hardcore. Instrumentally, the song primarily consists of a dense arrangement of guitar, bass, drums, and an orchestra. "Famous Last Words" contains a guitar solo played by Toro, inspired by those of Randy Rhoads. According to Toro, he wrote the solo after having listened to many of Rhoads' solos the night before, and playing the first thing he thought of after waking up. Additionally, during the song's bridge, much of the instrumentation drops out before it returns to its previous "riotous" self. "Famous Last Words" makes extensive use of stacked vocal tracks, with Gigwise's Chloe Spinks noting how its harmonies and counter-melodies add power to the song. Christopher Weingarten of The New York Times compared the sound of "Famous Last Words" to that of other New Jersey bands like Lifetime and Midtown.

Lyrically, "Famous Last Words" focuses on themes of optimism and making the most out of life. In an interview with MTV, Gerard Way called the track one of the most important on The Black Parade, as it "leaves you with a sense of redemption and hope" not otherwise found on the album. Additionally, Dan Martin of NME observed how the track served as both the climax and moral lesson of the narrative of the record, which featured its protagonist, The Patient, dying of cancer. However, both Tom Shepherd of Kerrang! and Margaret Farrell of Stereogum noticed that the song, as "one final twist", does not reveal The Patient's fate.

== Release and live performances ==
The first appearance of "Famous Last Words" was on The Black Parade. The album was released on October 23, 2006, through Reprise Records; "Famous Last Words" is the final song on the standard track list. (Note: While "Famous Last Words" is considered the album's final track on the liner notes, a secret track titled "Blood" plays after roughly a minute and a half of silence following the conclusion of "Famous Last Words".) Later, it was released onto radio on January 9, 2007 in the United States, and was officially released as the album's second single on January 22 in the United Kingdom. CD and 7" records of the song were released on the same day. Both of the physical releases included "My Way Home Is Through You" as a B-side, while the CD also featured "Kill All Your Friends". According to Craig Aaronson, "Famous Last Words" was originally considered to be the album's lead single, although "Welcome to the Black Parade" was chosen instead. A live recording of the song is featured on The Black Parade is Dead!, which includes the final show performed on The Black Parade World Tour (2007–2008). It was later featured on the track list for the band's greatest hits album, May Death Never Stop You, released in 2014. The song was also released as part of The Black Parade/Living with Ghosts, the 10th-anniversary reissue of The Black Parade, on September 23, 2016.

"Famous Last Words" has been featured on the set lists for multiple of My Chemical Romance's concert tours. It was played during the Black Parade World Tour, the 2007 Projekt Revolution tour, the World Contamination Tour (2010–2012), their reunion tour (2019–2023), and the Long Live The Black Parade tour in 2025. It was also performed at the Reading and Leeds Festivals in 2011, the 2022 Riot Fest, and at the When We Were Young festival in 2024.

== Critical reception ==
"Famous Last Words" has received generally positive reviews from music critics in reviews of The Black Parade. Dan Martin of NME lauded the song for being "pure Hollywood melodrama", and Sputnikmusic's DaveyBoy identified the track as a standout on the record. Andy Greenwald of Spin found the song to be an effective closer to the album; however, David Fricke of Rolling Stone felt that the album had already "[lost] luster" by that point due to its "excess". Upon its release as a single, "Famous Last Words" similarly received mixed-to-positive reviews from critics. The staff of NME similarly wrote that the band was "at their pulverising, pug-ugly best" on the track, while Fraser McAlpine of the BBC gave the single a five-star review, despite recognizing it as a safe pick for a single. The Skinny's Jamie Borthwick similarly critiqued the song for being "safe, glamorous sounding rock" in his three-star review, despite praising its catchiness. Mike Diver of Drowned in Sound gave the single a five-out-of-ten review, calling it "hackneyed" and comparing it negatively to the band's previous single "Welcome to the Black Parade".

The track has performed well in professional rankings of songs on The Black Parade. Shepherd placed it atop his ranking of the record, giving particular praise towards its authenticity and sound. American Songwriter's Lauren Boisvert ranked the track second, seeing it as the embodiment of the album's message of understanding towards the "broken, scared, [and] lonesome" children who looked to the band for comfort. Ariana Bacle of Entertainment Weekly put the song at third, writing how the song epitomized the "rousing anthems that find light in the darkness" which the band embraced on The Black Parade. Alternative Press's Mackenzie Templeton ranked the track fifth, lauding its chorus and guitar solo.

Additionally, "Famous Last Words" has been featured in rankings of My Chemical Romance's discography as a whole. The staff of Billboard included it in their list of the band's 15 best songs, with Taylor Weatherby commenting on the song's optimistic message in light of The Black Parade's themes of death. Both Sam Law of Kerrang! and Tom Bryant, writing for Louder Sound identified "Famous Last Words" as the band's best song, with the latter describing the track as "haunting, angry, wistful, regretful, and imploring". Marianne Eloise, also of Louder Sound, ranked it fourth in her list of the band's twenty best songs, giving particular attention towards the track's positivity. Cassie Whitt and Jake Richardson of Loudwire, in a review of the band's entire discography, similarly placed the song fourth, with the former calling it the band's "butterfly effect song" due to its role in reinvigorating the band following Mikey Way's departure. Margaret Farrell of Stereogum ranked the song as the band's fifth-best song, while Chloe Spinks of Gigwise ranked it at number eight. Guitar World's Sam Roche specifically included "Famous Last Words" in his list of the band's six greatest guitar moments, highlighting its riff and restrained guitar solo.

== Commercial performance ==
In the United States, "Famous Last Words" debuted at No. 20 on the Bubbling Under Hot 100 Singles chart on the week of January 27, 2007, before peaking at No. 88 on the Billboard Hot 100 three weeks later. The single has additionally reached No. 4 on the Alternative Airplay chart and No. 23 on the Mainstream Rock chart. In 2025, the Recording Industry Association of America (RIAA) certified the song two-times platinum. In Canada, "Famous Last Words" peaked at No. 3 on the Canada Rock chart, and reached No. 57 on the Canadian Hot 100. In addition, the track reached No. 2 on the Venezuelan Pop Rock chart.

In the United Kingdom, the track debuted and topped the UK Rock & Metal Singles chart the week of January 27, 2007, and reached No. 8 on the UK Singles chart. The British Phonographic Industry (BPI) certified the song platinum in 2025. The song also reached No. 2 in Scotland. Throughout the rest of Europe, "Famous Last Words" reached No. 11 in Norway, No. 30 in Ireland, No. 37 in Sweden, No. 57 in Austria, No. 68 in Germany, and No. 84 in the Czech Republic. Additionally, "Famous Last Words" charted at No. 6 in New Zealand and at No. 20 in Australia. Recorded Music NZ (RMNZ) certified the song platinum in 2024.

== Music video ==
The music video for "Famous Last Words" features the band performing the song in front of a burning fire. Bob Bryar received several burns to his leg during the shooting, along with Gerard Way and Ray Toro receiving additional injuries

The music video for "Famous Last Words" was conceived after the band's record label requested that they create a second music video in the same shoot as that of "Welcome to the Black Parade", to save money and effort. The video, directed by Samuel Bayer, was recorded on August 3, 2006. It features the band playing the song in front of the first video's burning set. During the shoot, several of the band's members were injured. Drummer Bob Bryar suffered third degree burns to his leg from playing too close to the burning float, which caused gangrene and became infected with staphylococcus aureus. The infection later spread across Bryar's body, nearly causing him to die and forcing him into surgery. Gerard Way broke his foot when Frank Iero tackled him near the end of filming, resulting in him briefly having to use crutches to walk. Additionally, Ray Toro fractured several of his fingers, which were already blistered from the extreme heat caused by the flames.

The video was released on January 11, 2007. It has been generally well received by critics, with Hanif Willis-Abdurraqib of MTV News calling it "perhaps the album's finest moment" due to its emotional rawness and its connection to the record's mission. Spin's Jeremy Gordon similarly noted how the music video connected to The Black Parade's theme of overcoming setbacks and moving forward, highlighting Way's injury as a "blurring of the lines between real and performed pain". In rankings of the band's eighteen music videos, Alternative Press placed "Famous Last Words" sixth for being "stunning", while Aliya Chaudhry of Kerrang! ranked it tenth for exemplifying the band's commitment to their work.

== Personnel ==
Credits are adapted from the liner notes of The Black Parade and Apple Music.

Locations

- Recorded at Eldorado Recording Studios (Burbank, California)
- Mixed at Resonate Music (Burbank, California)
- Mastered at Sterling Sound (New York City, New York)

Credits

My Chemical Romance
- Gerard Way – lead vocals, songwriter, producer
- Ray Toro – background vocals, lead guitar, songwriter, producer
- Frank Iero – background vocals, rhythm guitar, songwriter, producer
- Mikey Way – bass guitar, songwriter, producer
- Bob Bryar – drums, percussion, songwriter, producer

Additional performing artists

- Rob Cavallo – piano, producer
- Jamie Muhoberac – keyboards, synthesizer, Hammond organ, Wurlitzer piano
Additional personnel
- Chris Lord-Alge – mixing engineer
- Ted Jensen – mastering engineer
- Lars Fox – recording engineer
- Chris Steffen – recording engineer
- Mike Fasano – drum technician
- Andrew Busher – guitar technician
- Tyler Dragness – guitar technician
- Doug McKean – engineer
- Keith Armstrong – assistant engineer
- Jimmy Hoyson – assistant engineer

== Charts ==
=== Weekly charts ===
Weekly chart performance for "Famous Last Words"
Chart (2007)	Peak position
Australia (ARIA)	20
Austria (Ö3 Austria Top 40)	57
Canada Hot 100 (Billboard)	57
Canada Rock (Billboard)	3
Czech Republic Airplay (ČNS IFPI)	84
European Hot 100 Singles (Billboard)	30
Germany (GfK)	68
Ireland (IRMA)	30
New Zealand (Recorded Music NZ)	6
Norway (VG-lista)	11
Scottish Singles Sales (Official Charts)	2
Sweden (Sverigetopplistan)	37
UK Singles (Official Charts)	8
UK Airplay (Music Week)	30
UK Rock & Metal (Official Charts)	1
US Billboard Hot 100	88
US Alternative Airplay (Billboard)	4
US Mainstream Rock (Billboard)	23
Venezuela Pop Rock (Record Report)	2

=== Year-end charts ===
Year-end chart performance for "Famous Last Words"
Chart (2007)	Position
UK Singles (OCC)	163
US Alternative Airplay (Billboard)	24

== Certifications ==
Certifications for "Famous Last Words"
Region	Certification	Certified units/sales
New Zealand (RMNZ)	Platinum	30,000^{‡}
United Kingdom (BPI)	Platinum	600,000^{‡}
United States (RIAA)	2× Platinum	2,000,000^{‡}
^{‡} Sales+streaming figures based on certification alone.

== Release history ==
Release dates and formats for "Famous Last Words"
Region	Date	Format	Label	Ref.
United States	January 9, 2007	Mainstream radio	Reprise	
United Kingdom	January 22, 2007	Mainstream radio	Reprise	
United Kingdom	January 22, 2007	7" vinyl	Reprise	
United Kingdom	January 22, 2007	CD single	Reprise	
Australia	January 22, 2007	CD single	Reprise	
