= I Don't Love You =

2007 single by My Chemical Romance

Single by My Chemical Romance

from the album The Black Parade
- Released: April 2, 2007
- Recorded: 2006
- Studio: Eldorado Recording, Burbank
- Genre: Emo
- Length: 3:58
- Label: Reprise
- Songwriters: Bob Bryar; Frank Iero; Ray Toro; Gerard Way; Mikey Way
- Producers: Rob Cavallo; My Chemical Romance

My Chemical Romance singles chronology
"Famous Last Words" (2007)	"I Don't Love You" (2007)	"Teenagers" (2007)

Music video
- "I Don't Love You" on YouTube "I Don't Love You (Outtake Version)" on YouTube

"I Don't Love You" is a song by the American rock band My Chemical Romance from their third studio album, The Black Parade (2006). It was released as the album's third single on April 2, 2007. An emo power ballad, the song's lyrics focus on the Patient, the main protagonist of The Black Parade, as he breaks up with his lover. Written by all five of the band members and produced by them alongside Rob Cavallo, it was one of the first songs created for the album. The song's music video, directed by Marc Webb, was filmed entirely in black-and-white, and goes between shots of a couple breaking up and the band performing.

The song has received positive reviews from music critics, with many praising its emotional message. It charted in multiple countries, reaching number 35 on the overall European Hot 100 Singles chart and number 13 on the UK singles chart. It has been certified Platinum by Music Canada and the Recording Industry Association of America (RIAA), and Gold by the British Phonographic Industry (BPI) and Recorded Music NZ. It has been performed during multiple of the band's concert tours.

== Background and production ==
"I Don't Love You" was created while My Chemical Romance was touring in support of their second studio album, Three Cheers for Sweet Revenge (2004). At the time, they wrote and recorded demos for several songs in their tour bus's makeshift studio. Lead singer Gerard Way referred to these demo recordings as "Revenge part two", a side project the band initially had no plans of releasing. Among these several demos was an early version of "I Don't Love You".

In 2006, the band went to S.I.R. Studios in New York City to begin writing their next studio album, The Black Parade (2006). "I Don't Love You" was selected as one of three songs that they carried over from their bus demos. The song was among the first from the album to be finalized, and was inspired by the Creedence Clearwater Revival single "Have You Ever Seen the Rain" (1971). All five band members are credited with writing the song. An early version of the song was shown on the band's 2006 DVD Life on the Murder Scene.

== Composition and lyrics ==
"I Don't Love You" is an emo power ballad that is three minutes and fifty-eight seconds long. The song starts with an opening guitar riff that David Fricke of Rolling Stone compared it to the works of the Buzzcocks and Iron Maiden. In addition, the song contains a guitar solo played by Toro. Multiple critics compared the song to Coldplay's single "Yellow", and the New York Times likened the song to the Smiths's "Please Please Please Let Me Get What I Want". NME compared to Green Day's "Boulevard of Broken Dreams" (2004), as well as the works of the band Keane.

Lyrically, the song revolves around the Patient as he realizes his relationship is certain to end as he nears his death. Eventually, he begins pressuring his loved one to admit that she doesn't love him anymore. The track has multiple instances of Way yelling "baby get out". Sawdey and Chloe Spinks of Gigwise referred to it as an "anti-love song", while Ryan Dombal of Pitchfork interpreted it as one about an abusive relationship.

== Release and live performances ==
"I Don't Love You" was first announced as the sixth song on The Black Parade on September 13, 2006, originally titled as "I Don't Love You Like I Did". The song was released alongside the album on October 23, 2006. It was later released as the album's third single on April 2, 2007. The song was included on the 2008 live album and DVD The Black Parade Is Dead!, which featured the final show performed on the Black Parade World Tour. The song was also released on September 23, 2016 as part of The Black Parade/Living with Ghosts, the 10th-anniversary reissue of The Black Parade.

"I Don't Love You" has been played live during performances of The Black Parade as a whole, including the band's Black Parade World Tour from 2007 to 2008, the 2024 When We Were Young festival, and the 2025 Long Live The Black Parade tour. They also performed it during their reunion show in 2019, and their ensuing reunion tour in 2022.

== Critical reception ==
Ryan Dombal of Pitchfork called "I Don't Love You" the band's "first proper power ballad", containing everything that they believed a ballad should have and evoking the style of older power ballads such as "Yellow". Ariana Bacle of Entertainment Weekly called it a "break-up anthem for the ages" with the added emotional weight of the Patient's impending death in the song. She also wrote that the song was a departure from My Chemical Romance's usual sound, using it as an opportunity to "prove their versatility". Chloe Spinks of Gigwise called it a powerful ballad that wasn't "soppy" or "malleable". Marianne Eloise of Louder described it as one of the more simple songs from The Black Parade, and a "sob-inducing examination of true heartbreak", both within and outside of the context of The Black Parade's story. Margaret Farrell of Stereogum and Taylor Weatherby of Billboard both highlighted Way's vocal performance, the former calling it "bitter and resentful".

In their retrospective rankings of My Chemical Romance's discography, Farrell ranked it as the band's seventh best song, while Eloise and Billboard ranked it eighth. Writing for PopMatters, Andy Belt ranked it as the band's thirteenth best song, and Spinks ranked it nineteenth. Cassie Whitt and Jake Richardson of Loudwire ranked it fifty-sixth. Weatherby called it one of the band's most underrated singles.

== Commercial performance ==
In Europe, the single reached number 35 on the overall European Hot 100 Singles chart. On individual national charts, it reached number 27 on the Irish Singles chart, 64 on the Czech Republic Airplay chart, and 89 in Germany. In the United Kingdom, it reached number 13 on the UK Singles chart and number three on the Scotland Singles chart. In 2025, "I Don't Love You" charted at number four on the Southeast Asia chart, and number five on the Malaysia International chart. The song has been certified platinum by the Recording Industry Association of America (RIAA) and Music Canada, and certified gold by the British Phonographic Industry (BPI) and Recorded Music NZ (RMNZ).

== Music video ==
The music video for "I Don't Love You" was directed by Marc Webb and shot entirely in black and white. The first part of the video focuses on two lovers in an abstract world, where their relationship ends with the two physically breaking apart into pieces and the female lover crying blood. The second part cuts between shots of the band performing and their instruments exploding. The video was the first one for The Black Parade that was directed by Webb; the record's preceding videos were directed by Samuel Bayer.

Anna Pickard, writing for The Guardian, called it a "sad video" where neither story "wins the heart of his or her quarry". Aliya Chaudhry of Kerrang! ranked it as the band's eighth best music video, calling it a "concept-driven masterpiece" that used the black-and-white color scheme as abiding by The Black Parade's color scheme while also creating a "powerful tribute to classic cinema". Alternative Press ranked it as their eleventh best music video, calling it a "proper tear-jerker" that went alongside the "ultimate emo heartbreak anthem".

== Credits and personnel ==
Credits are adapted from the liner notes of The Black Parade and Apple Music.

Locations

- Recorded at Eldorado Recording Studios (Burbank, California)
- Mixed at Resonate Music (Burbank, California)
- Mastered at Sterling Sound (New York City, New York)

Credits

My Chemical Romance
- Gerard Way – lead vocals, songwriter, producer
- Ray Toro – background vocals, guitar (lead and acoustic), songwriter, producer
- Frank Iero – background vocals, rhythm guitar, songwriter, producer
- Mikey Way – bass guitar, songwriter, producer
- Bob Bryar – drums, songwriter, producer

Additional performing artists

- Rob Cavallo – piano, producer
- Jamie Muhoberac – organ, Wurlitzer piano
Additional personnel
- Chris Lord-Alge – mixing engineer
- Ted Jensen – mastering engineer
- Lars Fox – recording engineer
- Chris Steffen – recording engineer
- Mike Fasano – drum technician
- Andrew Busher – guitar technician
- Tyler Dragness – guitar technician
- Doug McKean – engineer
- Keith Armstrong – assistant mixing engineer
- Jon Herroon – assistant engineer
- Jimmy Hoyson – assistant engineer

== Charts ==
2007 chart performance for "I Don't Love You"
Chart (2007)	Peak position
Australia (ARIA)	64
Czech Republic Airplay (ČNS IFPI)	37
European Hot 100 Singles (Billboard)	35
Finland Airplay (Radiosoittolista)	11
Germany (GfK)	89
Ireland (IRMA)	27
Scottish Singles Sales (Official Charts)	3
UK Singles (Official Charts)	13
UK Airplay (Music Week)	15

2025 chart performance for "I Don't Love You"
Chart (2025)	Peak position
Malaysia (IFPI)	5
Malaysia International (RIM)	4

== Certifications ==
Certifications for "I Don't Love You"
Region	Certification	Certified units/sales
Canada (Music Canada)	Platinum	80,000^{‡}
New Zealand (RMNZ)	Gold	15,000^{‡}
United Kingdom (BPI)	Gold	400,000^{‡}
United States (RIAA)	Platinum	1,000,000^{‡}
^{‡} Sales+streaming figures based on certification alone.
