= Remember the Laughter =

Studio album by Ray Toro
- Released: November 18, 2016
- Recorded: 2013–2016
- Studio: Ray Toro home studio
- Genre: Alternative rock
- Length: 41:20
- Label: We're All A Little Crazy
- Producer: Ray Toro

Singles from Remember the Laughter
- 1. "Isn't That Something" Released: 2013

Remember the Laughter is the first solo studio album by American guitarist Ray Toro. The album was self-released on November 18, 2016. It was Toro's first album since the original disbandment of American rock band My Chemical Romance.

== Track listing ==
All tracks are written by Ray Toro.

No.	Title	Length
1.	"Isn't That Something"	3:03
2.	"Walking in Circles"	3:01
3.	"Wedding Day"	0:40
4.	"We Save"	3:27
5.	"Ascent"	0:13
6.	"The Great Beyond"	4:21
7.	"Take the World"	3:51
8.	"Father's Day"	0:25
9.	"The Lucky Ones"	2:53
10.	"Requiem"	4:11
11.	"Look At You Now"	4:56
12.	"Eruption"	0:21
13.	"Hope for the World"	3:34
14.	"Waiting Room"	0:20
15.	"Remember The Laughter"	6:15
Total length:		41:20

== Personnel ==
Additional Personnel

- Ray Toro: guitars, vocals, drums, bass, keyboards, samples, overdubs
- Jarrod Alexander: drums on "Walking In Circles", "We Save", "Take The World", "The Lucky Ones", and "Remember The Laughter"
- Jamie Muhoberac: keyboards, piano, programming on "Walking In Circles", "Requiem", "Look At You Now", and "Hope For The World"
- Tim Pierce: guitars on "Requiem" and guitars and villette gryphon on "Look At You Now"
- Chris Chaney: bass on "Requiem" and "Look At You Now"
- Steve Boeddeker: background vocals on "We Save"
- David C. Hughes: background vocals on "We Save"
- Andre Zweers: background vocals on "We Save"
- Tom Rasulo: drums and additional programming on "Requiem" and "Look At You Now"
- Doug McKean: arranging, engineering
- David C. Hughes: mixer
- Gene Grimaldi: mastering
