= The Black Parade =

2006 studio album by My Chemical Romance

Studio album by My Chemical Romance
- Released: October 23, 2006
- Recorded: April–August 2006
- Studios: El Dorado (Burbank); Capitol (Hollywood) (Note: Strings and horns; Liza Minnelli's vocals on "Mama".)
- Genres: Emo; alternative rock; pop-punk; hard rock; punk rock; glam rock
- Length: 51:53
- Label: Reprise
- Producers: Rob Cavallo; My Chemical Romance

My Chemical Romance chronology
Life on the Murder Scene (2006)	The Black Parade (2006)	The Black Parade Is Dead! (2008)

Vinyl cover

Singles from The Black Parade
- 1. "Welcome to the Black Parade" Released: September 12, 2006; 2. "Famous Last Words" Released: January 22, 2007; 3. "I Don't Love You" Released: April 2, 2007; 4. "Teenagers" Released: July 9, 2007

The Black Parade is the third studio album by the American rock band My Chemical Romance, first released on October 23, 2006, through Reprise Records. A concept album, it is centered on the story of a man suffering from terminal cancer known as "The Patient", as he nears the end of his life. It has predominantly been considered an emo, alternative rock, pop-punk, hard rock, punk rock, and glam rock record. It was produced by the band alongside Rob Cavallo.

Work on The Black Parade began in early 2006, with the band being influenced by the success and expectations of their previous studio album, Three Cheers for Sweet Revenge (2004); Gerard Way sought to create a concept album as the follow up to Three Cheers For Sweet Revenge. Recording for The Black Parade took place from April to August 2006, during which, the band secluded themselves in the Paramour Mansion. Due to their self-imposed isolation, the band's members, particularly bassist Mikey Way, faced mental health issues that impacted the album's production and influenced several of its songs.

The Black Parade received generally favorable reviews from critics upon release. It debuted at number two on both the Billboard 200 and the UK Albums Chart. It has been certified as 4× platinum in the United States, Canada and the United Kingdom, platinum in Australia, and gold in Argentina, Chile, and Italy. It was also given the Platinum Europe Award by the International Federation of the Phonographic Industry. The album was supported by four singles: "Welcome to the Black Parade", which was the band's first number-one single in the United Kingdom, "Famous Last Words", "I Don't Love You", and "Teenagers". In support of the album, My Chemical Romance embarked on The Black Parade World Tour from February 2007 to May 2008.

In the years since its release, The Black Parade has been revered as one of, if not the most important, album in emo, as well as My Chemical Romance's defining work. The album's popularity ended the dominance of emo pop, and influenced metalcore, pop and hip hop artists, and film soundtracks, as well as alternative culture and fashion. A tenth anniversary reissue, The Black Parade/Living with Ghosts, was released in 2016, while a 20th anniversary deluxe edition including a selection of bonus tracks was released in 2026; the 20th anniversary edition propelled The Black Parade to number one on the Billboard 200 and UK Albums Chart for the first time. In 2020, Rolling Stone ranked The Black Parade number 361 in its updated list of the "500 Greatest Albums of All Time".

== Background ==
My Chemical Romance released their second studio album, Three Cheers for Sweet Revenge, in 2004. A commercial and critical success, it helped the band become one of the most popular emo acts of the time. After returning home from that album's promotional tour in late 2005, the band became worried about whether or not their success was a "flash-in-the-pan" moment that would solely amount to nothing more than Revenge. Under increased scrutiny, the band worried that the stardom raised expectations for their future work. Frontman Gerard Way was concerned that the band's image would be permanently attached to Three Cheers For Sweet Revenge and its themes fueled by the band members' mental health.

When looking on where to begin with their next album, the band started by reviewing and finalizing a series of demos they wrote in a makeshift studio while touring in 2005, which were part of a side project that the band simply referred to as "Revenge part two". These demos would go on to become "Dead!", "Disenchanted", and "I Don't Love You". "Dead!", in particular, was based on the scrutiny and criticism the band faced while touring and written as a statement on defying the expectations of their critics. The ideas behind what inspired the creation of "Dead!" would influence the band's ideas and concepts for their work when they went to the S.I.R. Studios in New York City to begin work on their third album in early 2006.

== Production and writing ==
While writing new material, the band aimed to replicate the emotional rush that went into Revenge, while also surpassing it in scale as much as possible. They wanted to create an album that would be considered a "classic", something passed on from generation to generation. While Revenge was largely an album composed of whatever each band member could individually come up with, they aimed to try and make their third album more coherent, with shared general themes and a storyline. Gerard Way would create a storyline centered around life and death, which would later evolve into one centered around a man dying of cancer, whilst death presents itself to him in the form of his fondest childhood memory: his father taking him to see a marching band while he was a child. From there, he created a plethora of characters that would exist within the album's world: Mother War, Fear and Regret, The Soldiers, and The Escape Artist. The album would adopt this story, becoming a concept album. The album's working title was The Rise and Fall of My Chemical Romance, although its name was later changed into The Black Parade. Shortly after the band entered S.I.R. Studios, they created early versions of songs that would become "The End.", which was originally known as "Intro", "Mama", and "Teenagers".

To work on The Black Parade, My Chemical Romance traveled to Los Angeles in April 2006. They chose to record the majority of the album in the Paramour Mansion. They also got in contact with Rob Cavallo, a producer known for his work on albums from other artists like Green Day, to help produce the album. By the time that the band arrived at the Paramour, only about a third of the record had been written. The mansion itself at the time of the album's production was noted by the musicians as being scary and uneasy to be in, with all of the band members believing that the nature of the mansion "bled" into the sound of the music itself and left a significant impact on them all. Gerard Way, in particular, felt a necessity to "cut himself open" in order to write good music and completely engulfed himself within the atmosphere of living in the Paramour. He also found that he would often struggle to sleep while living in the mansion due to "night terrors". Bassist Mikey Way developed depression and alcoholism from the toll that living in the mansion left on him, particularly due to a lack of communication to the outside world.

After straining themselves for a long period of time, the band took a short break to play at Emo's in Austin, Texas. While this significantly helped out with the band's mental health, it led to them hitting a creative roadblock and the album's writing process halted. While Frank Iero managed to write one song during this brief period, "House of Wolves", it was apparent to all of the band members that they were struggling to get back on track. Motivated by their own frustrations towards their lack of creativity at the time, Ray Toro toyed around with a song titled "The Saddest Music in the World". Gerard Way helped Toro with the song, motivated by his fears about Mikey's mental health, and it eventually became "Famous Last Words". After that song was created as a method of letting out his emotions, Gerard Way along with the rest of the band managed to start coming up with new music again. Around the same time that "Famous Last Words" was created, Gerard wrote "Sleep", which was based on the troubles he faced falling asleep at the time.

Shortly afterwards, the band revisited a song concept they had originally sketched out in their earliest recording sessions, "The Five of Us Are Dying". It was the hardest song that the band tried to make for the record, having to rewrite it several times and never being satisfied with the result. In the middle of the song's creation, Gerard broke up with his girlfriend of six years, causing further distress during its production. It was not until Cavallo showed the band a short piano piece that he had written, which was then attached to the beginning of the song, that the band realized what they wanted to do with the song. It later evolved into the album's centerpiece, "Welcome to the Black Parade". A lot of music was written for the album would end up being cut by its final release, including a scrapped unknown cover song that was never recorded. In 2016, Gerard Way stated that The Black Parade "could have been, and almost was, a double album". One such example of a cut song was "Kill All Your Friends", which Gerard Way would go on to regret not putting on the album. Recording for The Black Parade would end by August 2006. The band would assist Cavallo with the final production of the album, while Chris Lord-Alge would mix the album and Doug McKean would serve as its engineer.

== Composition and lyrics ==
The Black Parade has been considered an emo, alternative rock, pop-punk, hard rock, punk rock, glam rock, progressive rock, and post-hardcore album. It also features several influences from 1970s classic rock, pop music, soft rock, arena rock, metal, and gothic rock. The album focuses on the aforementioned story of a man dying of cancer, known as "the Patient", as he nears the end of his life and goes on a journey to the afterlife. Throughout his journey, the "Patient" reflects on his life and the traumas that went along with it; death itself is primarily presented to the Patient in the form of his fondest childhood memory, a marching band that his father took him to see when he was young.

=== Songs ===
"Welcome to the Black Parade"
Two 15-second samples from "Welcome to the Black Parade". The song has been distinctively recognized for its opening piano note of G5, and has been classified as the band's signature song.

The album opens up with "The End", a track that uses a heart rate monitor and follows the Patient as he nears his death. "The End." then leads into the albums first proper full song, "Dead!" as the heart rate monitor from former flat lines. Lyrically, "Dead!" also follows the Patient's impending death, but interprets his fate in a sarcastic, cheerful manner. The album then leads into "This Is How I Disappear" and "The Sharpest Lives", two songs that are fairly similar. The former showcases a different way of discussing death, calling for one to "drain all the blood and give the kids a show". Meanwhile, the latter is about the idea of living life without caring about the consequences of one's actions, as the Patient looks back on his messy youth. The album's centerpiece, "Welcome to the Black Parade", focuses on the Patient's childhood memory before his death. The song opens up a brief piano introduction that later transforms into a grand-scale song that incorporates several aspects of various rock music sub-genres. Following that song, "I Don't Love You" serves as the album's first power ballad, with its themes being self-explanatory.

"House of Wolves" covers the Patient as he experiences the afterlife, and seemingly ends up in hell. Meanwhile, "Cancer" is where the character comes to terms with the titular disease and the effects that it has left on his appearance and life. "Mama" is centered around the character of Mother War, who represents the Patient's mother, while the Patient begs her for forgiveness for his actions throughout his life. The song features Liza Minnelli, who acts on the behalf of Mother War. Following afterwards, "Sleep" marks a slower point in the album as a second power ballad. "Teenagers" is unique from the rest of the album in the sense that it is not related to the story of the Patient at all, instead being based around Gerard Way's concerns about the youth being viewed by the government and society as "meat". After that song, the album returns to the story of the Patient with "Disenchanted", the album's final power ballad that follows the Patient as he finally nears his demise, and amounts life to nothing more than a "lifelong wait for a hospital stay" in the process. The album closes with "Famous Last Words", (Note: While "Famous Last Words" is considered the album's final track on the liner notes, a hidden track titled "Blood" plays after roughly a minute and a half of silence following the conclusion of "Famous Last Words".) which instead of being a final track exclusively about death, is about making a promise to carry on and making the most of life while you're still alive.

== Release and promotion ==
The band formally announced their third studio album on July 31, 2006, with the title of The Black Parade being revealed on August 25 alongside several details about the album, such as song titles and touring information. Six days later, the band performed at the 2006 MTV Video Music Awards pre-show in New York, and debuted "Welcome to the Black Parade" during their performance. The song was released for streaming two days later. On September 12, the album's artwork and the full track list was revealed. The music video for "Welcome to the Black Parade" was released on September 28. On October 21, the band was the musical guest on an episode of Saturday Night Live, where they performed "Welcome to the Black Parade" and "Cancer".

The Black Parade was made available for streaming on October 19, and was released through Reprise on October 23 in Europe, with the official release date as October 24. The band played a record release show at Vintage Vinyl in the parking lot to celebrate its release on October 23. In Japan, the album was released on an enhanced CD, and also contains the song "Heaven Help Us" and a music video for "Welcome to the Black Parade". The album was supported by four singles, including the aforementioned "Welcome to the Black Parade". The album's second single, "Famous Last Words", was released on January 22, 2007. It was followed by "I Don't Love You" and "Teenagers", which were released on April 2 and July 9 respectively. In 2009, a compilation of B-sides from the album's singles was released, titled The Black Parade: The B-Sides.

In July 2016, the band announced a 10th anniversary reissue of the album, titled The Black Parade/Living with Ghosts. It was released on September 23, and features The Black Parade alongside a second disc titled Living With Ghosts. The second disc contains 11 demos and live tracks, many of which were for previously unreleased songs. It also contains an early version of "Welcome To The Black Parade", titled "The Five of Us Are Dying", which was released on streaming services two months before the reissue's release.

A 20th anniversary deluxe edition of the album was released on October 23, 2026. Advertised as including "everything [the band] finished during those sessions in a single collection", it includes the original album and six bonus tracks: the album's three B-sides, and three live recordings, including "Someone Out There Loves You".

== Tours ==
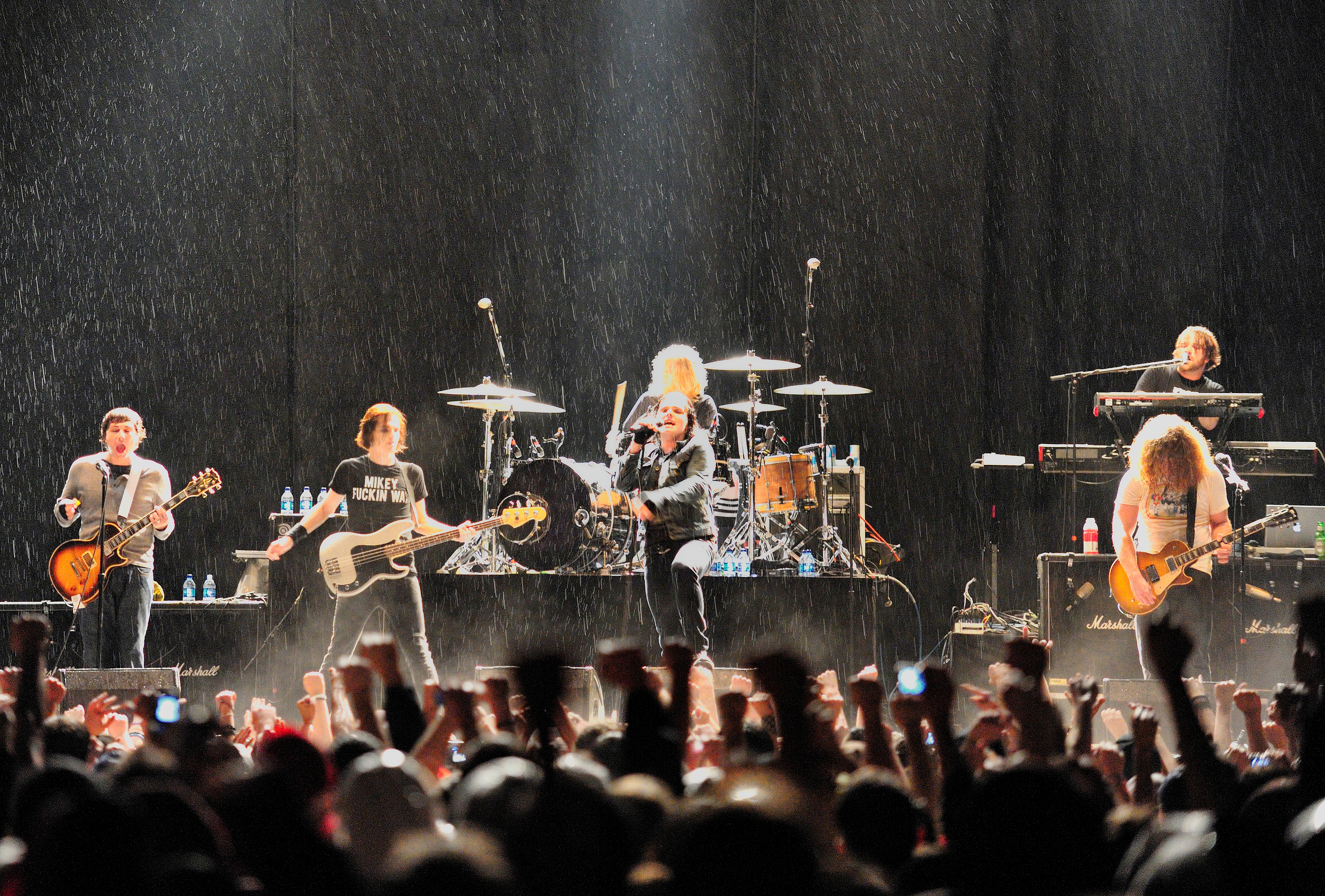
My Chemical Romance performing during the Black Parade World Tour in 2008

My Chemical Romance began the Black Parade World Tour on February 22, 2007, in Manchester, New Hampshire's Verizon Wireless Arena. Throughout the tour, the band would play The Black Parade in its entirety as the "Black Parade", an alter-ego band that the album was named after. The tour featured 133 performances worldwide. The band quit playing as the "Black Parade" on October 7, 2007, at the Palacio de los Deportes in Mexico City, Mexico, where the alter-ego was killed off. The tour ended on May 9, 2008 at Madison Square Garden. Their final show as the Black Parade, alongside another standalone show that the band performed later that month in New Jersey, were both recorded for The Black Parade Is Dead! , a live album and DVD released in June 2008.

During the tour, there were several cancellations and some members had to leave the tour for personal or medical reasons. Six shows were cancelled from April 29, 2007, to May 4, 2007, after the band and crew contracted food poisoning. The band Circa Survive had to replace Muse, whose members also suffered from the same food poisoning. On January 11, 2007, Frank Iero left the tour because of an unspecified illness. He was replaced by Drive By guitarist Todd Price. Mikey Way took time off to get married and spend time with his new wife, Alicia Simmons, and was replaced by guitar tech Matt Cortez from April 18, 2007, until October 4, 2007. Bob Bryar suffered injuries relating to his wrists during the tour which led to the cancellation of the show at the University of Maine on October 27, 2007. Bryar left the tour on November 9, 2007, and was replaced by a friend of the band, who wished to remain anonymous. Following the November 11, 2007, show in Newcastle upon Tyne, Frank Iero left the tour to return home after learning about a family member's illness. He was replaced by Matt Cortez.

In October 2024, the band performed The Black Parade in its entirety for the first time since 2007 at When We Were Young 2024. A month later, the band announced a second tour centered around the album, Long Live The Black Parade. The tour began at Seattle's T-Mobile Park on July 11, 2025, and concluded in Jakarta, Indonesia, on November 22, 2026.

== Critical reception ==
Professional ratings
Aggregate scores
Source	Rating
Metacritic	79/100
Review scores
Source	Rating
AllMusic	5/5 stars
Entertainment Weekly	A−
The Guardian	4/5 stars
Los Angeles Times	4/4 stars
MusicOMH	5/5 stars
NME	9/10
Rolling Stone	4/5 stars
Spin	4/5 stars
Sputnikmusic	4.5/5
Uncut	4/5 stars

The Black Parade has received critical acclaim. At Metacritic, which assigns a normalized rating out of 100 to reviews from mainstream critics, the album received an average score of 79, based on 24 professional critic reviews, which indicates "generally favorable reviews".

Dan Martin from NME compared the album to Green Day's American Idiot, positing that "it's a piece of work that will challenge every preconception you ever had about the people who made it." Tim Karan of Alternative Press called The Black Parade "MCR's whole raison d'etre rolled up into one mega-decibel calling card". IGN's Ed Thompson wrote, "The Black Parade is a rock and roll gem that celebrates everything that was over the top about the 1970s rock scene." David Fricke of Rolling Stone praised the classic rock feel of the album. Entertainment Weekly stated that "On their third studio album, a musical H-bomb of an effort, the Jersey quintet combine the rock-opera pomp of Queen with the darker, dirtier tones of their screamo past: Call it a Bro-hemian Rhapsody. Even without its broad concept — a dying cancer patient seeks revenge and redemption — Parade stands as one of the most cohesive, engaging rock records of 2006." Robert Christgau gave the album a two-star honorable mention saying, "In prog, a good sense of humor means so much."

The Observer gave the album a one star review, saying, "...it reeks of a band with ideas above its station." Theon Weber of Stylus praised the album's use of Queen influences, but went on to summarize the album as "...a goofy record of bubblegum punk, with Queen lapping at its edges and enough good tracks to justify the smattering of empty screamfests."

=== Accolades ===
The Black Parade was ranked by several publications as among the best albums to release in 2006. Among those publications was Rolling Stone, Kerrang!, and Rock Sound. Additionally, Wizard magazine praised the album in their "Best of 2006" issue, declaring it "an instant classic." The limited edition boxed set also earned My Chemical Romance a nomination for Best Boxed/Special Limited Edition at the 50th Annual Grammy Awards in 2008.

Accolades for The Black Parade
Publication	Country	Accolade	Year	Rank
Kerrang!	UK	The 50 Best Rock Albums Of The 2000s	2016	2
NME	UK	NME's top 50 albums of 2006	2006	10
Q	UK	Q Magazine Recordings Of The Year	2006	32
Rock Sound	UK	Top 75 Albums of the Year	2006	6
Rock Sound	UK	The 250 Greatest Albums of Our Lifetime	2019	1
Rolling Stone	US	50 Best Albums of 2006	2006	20
Rolling Stone	US	The 500 Greatest Albums of All Time	2020	361
Spin	US	The 40 Best Albums of 2006	2006	5
The Village Voice	US	Pazz & Jop: 2006's Top 25 Albums	2006	17

== Commercial performance ==
According to Tom Bryant, writing in Not the Life it Seems: The True Lives of My Chemical Romance, "When [The Black Parade] came out, it did not explode. Instead, it grew and grew as the band toured it ferociously." The album debuted at number two in the United States on the Billboard 200 behind Hannah Montana (2006). It also debuted at number two on the UK Albums Chart, behind Robbie Williams' Rudebox (2006). Following the release of the 20th anniversary deluxe edition, it reached number one on both charts, becoming My Chemical Romance's first chart-topping album in either country. In its first week, the album sold 240,000 copies in the US, far surpassing the 38,000 best-week sales of the band's previous album, Three Cheers for Sweet Revenge (2004). The Black Parade debuted at number two on the Canadian Albums Chart, with first-week sales of over 21,000 copies. It was held off the top spot by Gregory Charles' I Think of You (2006), moving an additional 10,000 units in its second week. The album debuted at number three on the Australian ARIA Albums Chart and was certified platinum after shipping more than 70,000 copies. It debuted atop the charts in New Zealand and was certified platinum there, with shipments of more than 15,000 and has since gone 3× Platinum by the RMNZ.

The band achieved its first number-one single in the United Kingdom with "Welcome to the Black Parade". The same song also became My Chemical Romance's first and only top 10 single in the United States.

In 2012, The Black Parade was certified Platinum by the International Federation of the Phonographic Industry (IFPI) for one million sales in Europe, and was also certified four-times Platinum by the RIAA, selling over 1.1 million physical copies. It has been certified 4× Platinum in the UK, and has sold just over 1,200,000 units there as of 2026. It received Gold certifications in Argentina (by the CAPIF), Chile (by the IFPI Chile), and Italy (by the FIMI). As of January 2018 the album had sold over three million copies in the U.S. The album was also certified 4× Platinum in Canada by Music Canada.

== Legacy and impact ==
The Black Parade has frequently been considered one of, if not the most important album to the emo music genre and sub-culture, as well as My Chemical Romance's defining work that made them a global phenomenon. Some have deemed it the emo or pop-punk equivalent to Sgt. Pepper's Lonely Hearts Club Band (1967), and others have labeled it as the greatest emo album ever made. The sound of emo music was permanently altered following the success of The Black Parade, with the album being attributed to the end of emo pop's mainstream popularity. The album also influenced several rappers that would gain prominence in the coming years, numerous metalcore bands, and contemporary pop artists, as well as film soundtracks. Alternative Press stated that The Black Parade would "carry on forever as the most technically ambitious and thematically magnificent record in all of emo", and Kerrang! wrote that the album "defined a generation and changed the landscape of rock forever", and was the "ultimate emo album". Luke Morgan Britton of NME wrote that the album "exploded the boundaries of its genre". In 2017, Clint Hale of Houston Press described The Black Parade as a "rock opera done right" and a "truly great record", the latter of which he believed most bands were unable to create, and that the album was "impossible to forget".

The Black Parade left a significant impact on alternative culture and fashion. Terry Bezer of Louder wrote that The Black Parade became a "way of life that changed the cultural landscape of the world", and that the themes demonstrated by the album were "embraced by an entire generation". Furthermore, the album's lead single, "Welcome to the Black Parade", has been considered an "emo anthem" as well as My Chemical Romance's best song. Kerrang! wrote that it was one of the "biggest, best and most important rock songs of the 21st century", and a "rallying cry for all who feel the world's dealt them a cruel hand". In 2008, British tabloid newspaper The Daily Mail attacked My Chemical Romance over the popularity of The Black Parade, accusing them of promoting suicide and describing emo culture as a "cult". In their story, the writers interpreted the idea of the "joining the black parade" as a genuine afterlife that emos seemingly believed in, and described emo culture as a whole as "characterised by depression, self-injury and suicide". They further highlighted the suicide of a young fan who started following the band shortly before her death. In response, more than 300 fans of the band protested outside of the newspaper's office in London, criticizing the newspaper for its inaccuracies, and accusing it of using the death of a young girl to prove a point, as well as taking advantage of an older audience that they believed was naturally more hostile towards alternative cultures. The newspaper later edited the story and issued an apology.

While The Black Parade did not receive much retroactive praise for several years, it began receiving more acclaim in the 2020s. In 2020, The Black Parade was included by Rolling Stone on their "500 Greatest Albums of All Time" list at number 361. The same publication later ranked it in 2022 as one of the best concept albums ever made. In 2011, IGN named The Black Parade one of the best rock albums of the 2000s decade. That same year, Kerrang! included the album in its "666 Albums You Must Hear Before You Die!" list with a score of 5 "K" 's, calling it a "genre-defining album". In 2021, Kerrang! considered The Black Parade to be the greatest emo album ever made. It was included in Rock Sound's 101 Modern Classics list at number nine, and, in April 2019, was named the best album released since the publication's launch in March 1999.

== Track listing ==
All tracks are written by Bob Bryar, Frank Iero, Ray Toro, Gerard Way and Mikey Way.

Standard edition
No.	Title	Length
1.	"The End."	1:52
2.	"Dead!"	3:15
3.	"This Is How I Disappear"	3:59
4.	"The Sharpest Lives"	3:20
5.	"Welcome to the Black Parade"	5:11
6.	"I Don't Love You"	3:58
7.	"House of Wolves"	3:04
8.	"Cancer"	2:22
9.	"Mama" (featuring Liza Minnelli)	4:39
10.	"Sleep"	4:43
11.	"Teenagers"	2:41
12.	"Disenchanted"	4:55
13.	"Famous Last Words"	4:59
14.	"Blood" (hidden track; not available on all editions)	2:53
Total length:		51:53

Japanese edition
No.	Title	Length
14.	"Heaven Help Us"	2:55
15.	"Welcome to the Black Parade" (music video)	5:14
Total length:		60:02

20th anniversary deluxe edition
No.	Title	Length
15.	"Heaven Help Us"	2:55
16.	"Kill All Your Friends"	4:29
17.	"My Way Home Is Through You"	2:58
18.	"Dead!" (live)	3:51
19.	"The Sharpest Lives" (live)	3:27
20.	"Someone Out There Loves You" (live)	3:28

== Personnel ==
=== My Chemical Romance ===
- Bob Bryar – drums, percussion
- Frank Iero – guitars, backing vocals
- Ray Toro – guitars, backing vocals; bass guitar on "Cancer"
- Gerard Way – lead and backing vocals
- Mikey Way – bass guitar (except on "Cancer")

=== Additional musicians ===
- David Campbell – string and horn arrangements
- Rob Cavallo – acoustic piano
- Cheech Iero – additional percussion on "Welcome to the Black Parade"
- Linda Iero, Donald James & Donna Lee Way – additional vocals on "Mama"
- Liza Minnelli – guest vocals on "Mama" as "Mother War"
- Jamie Muhoberac – Hammond B3 organ, synthesizer, and Wurlitzer electronic piano; acoustic piano and additional vocals on "Blood"

=== Technical ===
- Rob Cavallo – producer
- My Chemical Romance – producers
- Doug McKean – engineer
- Chris Steffen – recording engineer (El Dorado)
- Jimmy Hoyson – assistant engineer (Capitol)
- Jon Herroon – assistant engineer
- Chris Lord-Alge – mixing
- Keith Armstrong – assistant engineer
- Ted Jensen – mastering
- Lars Fox – additional Pro Tools
- Andrew "Hans" Busher – guitar technician
- Tyler Dragness – guitar technician
- Mike "Sack" Fasano – drum technician
- Chris Anthony – photography
- Matt Taylor – additional photography on Limited Edition, art direction, design
- Gerard Way – additional photography on Limited Edition, art direction
- Ray Toro – additional photography on Limited Edition
- Ellen Wakayama – art direction
- James Jean – illustrations

== Charts ==
=== Weekly charts ===
2006–2007 weekly chart performance for The Black Parade
Chart (2006–2007)	Peak position
Argentine Albums (CAPIF)	2
Australian Albums (ARIA)	3
Austrian Albums (Ö3 Austria)	4
Belgian Albums (Ultratop Flanders)	33
Belgian Alternative Albums (Ultratop Flanders)	15
Belgian Albums (Ultratop Wallonia)	91
Canadian Albums (Billboard)	2
Croatian Albums (HDU)	43
Czech Albums (ČNS IFPI)	31
Danish Albums (Hitlisten)	29
Dutch Albums (Album Top 100)	39
Dutch Alternative Albums (Alternative Top 30)	8
European Albums (Billboard)	4
Finnish Albums (Suomen virallinen lista)	11
French Albums (SNEP)	69
German Albums (Offizielle Top 100)	11
Greek Albums (IFPI)	42
Irish Albums (IRMA)	5
Italian Albums (FIMI)	20
Japanese Albums (Oricon)	10
Malaysian International Albums (RIM)	3
Mexican Albums (Top 100 Mexico)	8
New Zealand Albums (RMNZ)	1
Norwegian Albums (VG-lista)	11
Scottish Albums (Official Charts)	3
Swedish Albums (Sverigetopplistan)	4
Swiss Albums (Schweizer Hitparade)	18
Taiwanese Albums (Five Music)	11
UK Albums (Official Charts)	2
UK Rock & Metal Albums (Official Charts)	1
US Billboard 200	2
US Indie Store Album Sales (Billboard)	1
US Top Rock Albums (Billboard)	1

2018 weekly chart performance for The Black Parade
Chart (2018)	Peak position
South Korean International Albums (Gaon)	58

2020 weekly chart performance for The Black Parade
Chart (2020)	Peak position
Portuguese Albums (AFP)	44
US Top Alternative Albums (Billboard)	6

2026 weekly chart performance for The Black Parade
Chart (2026)	Peak position
Belgian Albums (Ultratop Flanders)	15
Belgian Albums (Ultratop Wallonia)	48
Dutch Albums (Album Top 100)	33
German Albums (Offizielle Top 100)	7
German Rock & Metal Albums (Offizielle Top 100)	3
Greek Albums (IFPI)	14
Hungarian Albums (MAHASZ)	9
Polish Physical Albums (ZPAV)	56
Scottish Albums (Official Charts)	1
Spanish Albums (Promusicae)	15
Swiss Albums (Schweizer Hitparade)	15
Swiss Rock Albums (Schweizer Hitparade)	3
UK Albums (Official Charts)	1
UK Rock & Metal Albums (Official Charts)	1
US Billboard 200	1

=== Year-end charts ===
2006 year-end chart performance for The Black Parade
Chart (2006)	Position
Australian Albums (ARIA)	60
Mexican Albums (Top 100 Mexico)	80
UK Albums (OCC)	77
US Billboard 200	164
US Top Rock Albums (Billboard)	24

2007 year-end chart performance for The Black Parade
Chart (2007)	Position
Australian Albums (ARIA)	41
Japanese Albums (Oricon)	61
New Zealand Albums (RMNZ)	27
Swedish Albums (Sverigetopplistan)	96
UK Albums (OCC)	61
US Billboard 200	51
US Top Rock Albums (Billboard)	12

2018 year-end chart performance for The Black Parade
Chart (2018)	Position
US Top Rock Albums (Billboard)	95

2020 year-end chart performance for The Black Parade
Chart (2020)	Position
US Top Alternative Albums (Billboard)	30
US Top Rock Albums (Billboard)	57

2021 year-end chart performance for The Black Parade
Chart (2021)	Position
US Top Alternative Albums (Billboard)	29
US Top Rock Albums (Billboard)	41

2022 year-end chart performance for The Black Parade
Chart (2022)	Position
US Top Rock & Alternative Albums (Billboard)	37

2023 year-end chart performance for The Black Parade
Chart (2023)	Position
US Top Rock & Alternative Albums (Billboard)	65

2025 year-end chart performance for The Black Parade
Chart (2025)	Position
US Top Rock & Alternative Albums (Billboard)	48

== Certifications ==
Certifications and sales for The Black Parade
Region	Certification	Certified units/sales
Argentina (CAPIF)	Gold	20,000^{^}
Australia (ARIA)	Platinum	70,000^{^}
Canada (Music Canada)	4× Platinum	400,000^{‡}
Chile	Gold	7,500
Denmark (IFPI Danmark)	2× Platinum	40,000^{‡}
Ireland (IRMA)	Platinum	15,000^{^}
Italy (FIMI) sales since 2009	Gold	25,000^{‡}
Japan (RIAJ)	Platinum	250,000^{^}
Mexico (AMPROFON)	Gold	50,000^{^}
New Zealand (RMNZ)	3× Platinum	45,000^{‡}
United Kingdom (BPI)	4× Platinum	1,200,000^{‡}
United States (RIAA)	4× Platinum	4,000,000^{‡}
Summaries
Europe (IFPI)	Platinum	1,000,000^{*}
^{*} Sales figures based on certification alone.^{^} Shipments figures based on certification alone.^{‡} Sales+streaming figures based on certification alone.

== See also ==
- Concept albums
