= Canfield-Moreno Estate =

Historic site in Los Angeles, California

- The Paramour Mansion during the 1930s

- Location within the Los Angeles metropolitan area
- 34.09475°N 118.272°W
- Location: 1923 Micheltorena St.

History
- Built: 1923

Site notes
- Architect: Robert D. Farquhar
- Architectural style: Mediterranean Revival
- Governing body: private

Los Angeles Historic-Cultural Monument
- Designated: 1988
- Reference no.: 391

The Canfield-Moreno Estate is a historic residence and estate located in the Moreno Highlands neighborhood of Silver Lake, Los Angeles, California. It was designated as a Los Angeles Historic-Cultural Monument in 1988. Originally known as Crestmount, the estate also is called the Paramour Estate.

== History ==
The mansion is a 22,000-square-foot (2,000 m^{2}) Mediterranean Revival complex on 4.5 acres. It was designed by architect Robert D. Farquhar and built in 1923. It was commissioned by Daisy Canfield, daughter of pioneer oilman Charles A. Canfield, when she was married to Jay Morris Danziger, then vice-president of Mexico Petroleum Company. When Daisy Canfield remarried to silent film star Antonio Moreno, it was the scene for lavish Sunday afternoon parties for members of high society and silent screen notables.

In 1929, the estate was deeded to the Chloe P. Canfield Memorial Home for girls by Daisy Canfield and her three sisters, Florence, Eileen and Caroline (wife of 1st Beverly Hills mayor Silsby Spalding). The school—named for Daisy's mother, who was murdered by her former coachman in 1906—was a stipulation of Charles A. Canfield's will.

On February 23, 1933, Daisy Canfield died of injuries she sustained in a car crash; her chauffeur-driven car plunged off Mulholland Drive while en route home from a party.

In 1953, the Archdiocese of Los Angeles bought the estate, and turned in into the Immaculate Conception Home for Girls. In 1988, the estate was designated Los Angeles Historic-Cultural Monument No. 391. In 1998, the property was sold $2.25 million to designer Dana Hollister, who named the property The Paramour Estate.

== In popular culture ==
=== Music ===
In 1999, the band Shivaree performed and recorded their song "Goodnight Moon" in the drained out pool of the estate.

In 2004, Britney Spears shot the music video for her cover of Bobby Brown's "My Prerogative" at the Paramour Mansion. The song was the first single off of her first compilation album, Greatest Hits: My Prerogative.

In 2006, My Chemical Romance lived in the mansion while writing their third album, The Black Parade. Frontman and lyricist Gerard Way suffered from night terrors while staying there, which he recorded his accounts of and used in the track "Sleep" on the album. The band claims they experienced paranormal activity in the mansion. Bassist Mikey Way was so negatively affected by the atmosphere that he experienced a mental health crisis, eventually moving out to seek treatment.

The estate was used as the filming location for the music video of Sofia Carson's song "Glowin' Up", which was featured in the 2021 Netflix film, My Little Pony: A New Generation.

=== Film and television ===
Throughout the early 2000s and early 2010s, the property was used in a multitude of different reality television series, including From G's to Gents, Love Games 2, Rock of Love: Charm School, Charm School with Ricki Lake, Rock Star: INXS, Rock Star: Supernova, and The X Effect.

The estate was used as a filming location for the horror films Halloween H20: 20 Years Later, Scream 3, and The Neon Demon. It also appears in Gangster Squad, Under the Silver Lake, and Clockstoppers.

== See also ==
- Owlwood Estate
