= Bob Bryar =

American rock drummer (1979–2024)

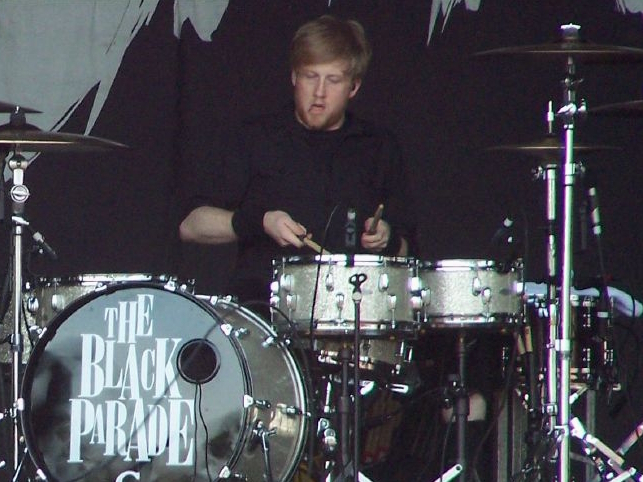
- Bryar performing with My Chemical Romance in 2007

Background information
- Born: Robert Cory Bryar; December 31, 1979; Chicago, Illinois, U.S.
- Died: November 24, 2024 (aged 44) Shelbyville, Tennessee, U.S.
- Occupations: Musician; sound engineer; tour manager; songwriter
- Instruments: Drums; percussion
- Years active: 2000–2014
- Formerly of: My Chemical Romance

Robert Cory Bryar (December 31, 1979 – November 24, 2024) was an American musician, sound engineer, songwriter, and touring manager who served as the drummer for the American rock band My Chemical Romance from 2004 to 2010. Born in Chicago, Bryar learned how to play the drums at the age of four, and played in several school bands. He later formed his own band before he went to the University of Florida to study sound engineering. By 2000, Bryar had joined the crews of several touring bands, including rock bands the Used and Thrice.

In 2004, he joined My Chemical Romance shortly after the release of the band's second studio album Three Cheers for Sweet Revenge (2004), replacing former drummer Matt Pelissier. He appeared in several of their subsequent music videos, and performed and co-wrote their third studio album, The Black Parade (2006). In 2010, for reasons that were undisclosed, Bryar departed from My Chemical Romance. He received co-writing credits for some songs on their fourth studio album, Danger Days: The True Lives of the Fabulous Killjoys (2010), and performed on their Conventional Weapons (2013) compilation album, which was recorded in 2009 prior to his departure.

Following his departure from the band, Bryar became a behind-the-scenes figure in tours for several bands. He retired from the music industry in 2014 and went on to become a real estate agent and an active supporter of dog rescue charities and sanctuaries, auctioning off his old drumming equipment and one of his My Chemical Romance outfits and donating the money. In November 2024, Bryar was found dead in his home in Shelbyville, Tennessee. His autopsy report ruled his cause of death as inconclusive.

== Early life and career ==
Robert Cory Bryar was born in Chicago, Illinois, on December 31, 1979. He began playing drums at the age of four, and when he later joined his school bands, he chose to play the instrument. Throughout his life up until high school, Bryar participated in his school's jazz band, marching band, and orchestra. Once he reached high school, he quit participating in school bands, believing that nobody took them seriously. He began playing as part of a separate jazz band, which would mainly play at parties and coffee shops. He later joined a punk rock band, and a King Crimson cover band as their second drummer.

One of Bryar's main influences was Rush drummer Neil Peart. According to Bryar, whenever he practiced drumming at the time, he would have Rush music playing in the background and try to keep up, and that his experience from doing so taught him more about drumming than any lesson he took. He also claimed that, eventually, he learned how to play every Rush song on drums, and that this accomplishment "continued through [his] drumming days". Another one of his inspirations was jazz fusion drummer Dave Weckl.

After the King Crimson cover band, Bryar formed his own punk rock band. He stated that, at the time, he believed that a band had to perform as much as possible. This conflicted with the lives of his bandmates, and Bryar gave up on the band. Afterwards, Bryar studied for a degree in sound engineering at the University of Florida. He later became the audio engineer of the House of Blues in Chicago, where he worked for a couple of years. Starting in 2000, he joined the crews of several touring bands, also as an audio engineer. These bands included the Used and Thrice. He also served as a tour manager.

=== My Chemical Romance ===
Bryar first met My Chemical Romance while working with the Used on a tour that the two bands were doing together. In 2004, My Chemical Romance kicked their then-drummer Matt Pelissier out of the band. Immediately after his departure, the band asked Bryar to be their new drummer, despite never hearing him play prior. He accepted the offer, subsequently relearning how to play the drums and quitting his current job. These events took place shortly after the band had released their second studio album, Three Cheers for Sweet Revenge (2004), with Bryar performing as part of the band's promotional tour for that album within a week of Pelissier's departure. During his time with My Chemical Romance, Bryar utilized a custom C&C drum kit.

Bryar appeared with the band on clip for "I'm Not Okay (I Promise)" (2004), where Bryar overcame an ankle injury he had endured prior to filming out of fear that he would be seen as unskilled. He later appeared on further music videos and the live album Life on the Murder Scene (2006). On the band's third studio album The Black Parade (2006), Bryar performed on and co-wrote all of its songs. The album was the first time that Bryar received credits on one of the band's works. During the filming of the music video for "Famous Last Words" (2007), Bryar endured significant third degree burns to his leg, which subsequently was infected with staphylococcus aureus. The infection later spread across his body, reaching his face and putting pressure on his brain. His injuries led to the cancellation of several promotional shows the band had scheduled for the album.

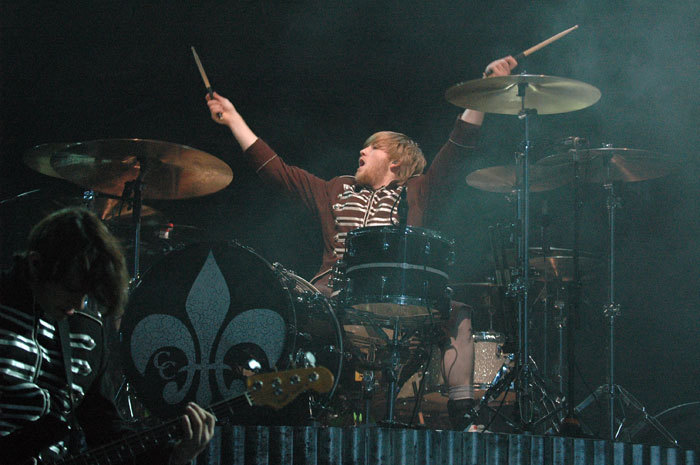
Bryar performing with My Chemical Romance in 2007

During the band's Black Parade World Tour (2007-08), Bryar had to pull out of several shows due to injuries to his wrist that later evolved into carpal tunnel syndrome. On the band's Myspace page, Bryar apologized for having to withdraw, stating that he had been experiencing wrist issues for a long time, with a "golf ball-sized lump" developed on his wrist while starting to "lose control and feeling in [his] fingers". One of the band's shows in Maine was fully cancelled, while Bryar was replaced with Saves the Day’s Pete Parada or Thursday’s Tucker Rule on certain dates. However, he still came with the band on these dates to help set up the stage, and later returned to drumming by January 2008.

In February 2010, Bryar parted ways with My Chemical Romance; according to biographer Tom Bryant, he was kicked out of the band. In March, rhythm guitarist Frank Iero shared the news on the band's official website, stating that it was a "painful decision for all of us to make and was not taken lightly". The reasons behind his departure were left vague, and none of the band members spoke on the matter at the time. In a 2024 tribute following Bryar's death, Iero stated that prior to Bryar's departure, one of his dogs was killed after being scammed by a dog trainer. Iero explained that the incident was a turning point in Bryar's relationship with the band, stating that "he just couldn't keep it together anymore" and that his "sadness, anger and distrust were too much to handle and took over all aspects".

The band released their fourth studio album Danger Days: The True Lives of the Fabulous Killjoys in 2010. Bryar is credited as a songwriter on five songs. Later from 2012 to 2013, the band released Conventional Weapons, a compilation album consisting of ten unreleased songs that were recorded in 2009, which feature Bryar as they were recorded prior to his departure. In March 2013, My Chemical Romance announced their breakup. In September 2016, Bryar was featured in an exclusive interview with Alternative Press to promote the band's reissue of The Black Parade. In his first interview since departing from the band, Bryar recalled several memories of recording and touring the album. When the band reunited in 2019, Bryar was not included as part of the lineup.

== Later life and death ==
Following his departure from My Chemical Romance, Bryar continued being involved in the music business as a behind-the-scenes figure in tours for several bands. He largely avoided media attention. In 2015, five years after his departure from the band, he said that the event resulted in him becoming depressed and suicidal, though that with the assistance of medication, he had been recovering. By October 2014, Bryar announced his departure from music, becoming a real estate agent. In January 2020, Bryar participated in a remembrance for then-recently-deceased Peart, recalling his "teenage obsession" and friendship with him.

In June 2021, Bryar announced that he had officially retired from drumming, citing his ongoing wrist issues, age, weight, and his desire to pursue "something new". That month, Bryar auctioned off his C&C drum kit from the "Helena" (2005) music video on eBay, and dedicated the money to the Williamson County Animal Control and Adoption Center located in Franklin, Tennessee. In October 2022, Bryar auctioned his uniform from The Black Parade on eBay and dedicated the money to abandoned and sheltered animals in Florida and South Carolina that were affected by Hurricane Ian, stating that "it's just sitting in a box doing nothing and people need help with money right now".

Bryar was last seen alive on November 4, 2024. On November 26, Bryar was found dead in his home in Shelbyville, Tennessee. According to his obituary, he died two days earlier. His autopsy report labeled his cause of death as "best classified as undetermined", with factors such as his significant decomposition making it hard to figure out the cause. The report noted that three open canisters of nitrous oxide were found next to his body, raising concerns of a possible overdose. It also stated that his body seemed to have experienced animal scavenging. My Chemical Romance paid tribute to Bryar through social media, while Iero penned a separate tribute to Bryar on Instagram, recounting his friendship with him and revealed a tattoo dedicated to Bryar. During the band's concert in Chicago (Bryar's hometown) on August 29, 2025, they projected Bryar's image onstage during the show as a tribute.

== Discography ==
=== My Chemical Romance ===
Studio albums

- The Black Parade (2006)
- Danger Days: The True Lives of the Fabulous Killjoys (2010; songwriting credit only)
- The Black Parade/Living with Ghosts (2016; reissue of The Black Parade)

Compilation albums

- Conventional Weapons (2012–2013)
