= Ray Toro =

American musician (born 1977)

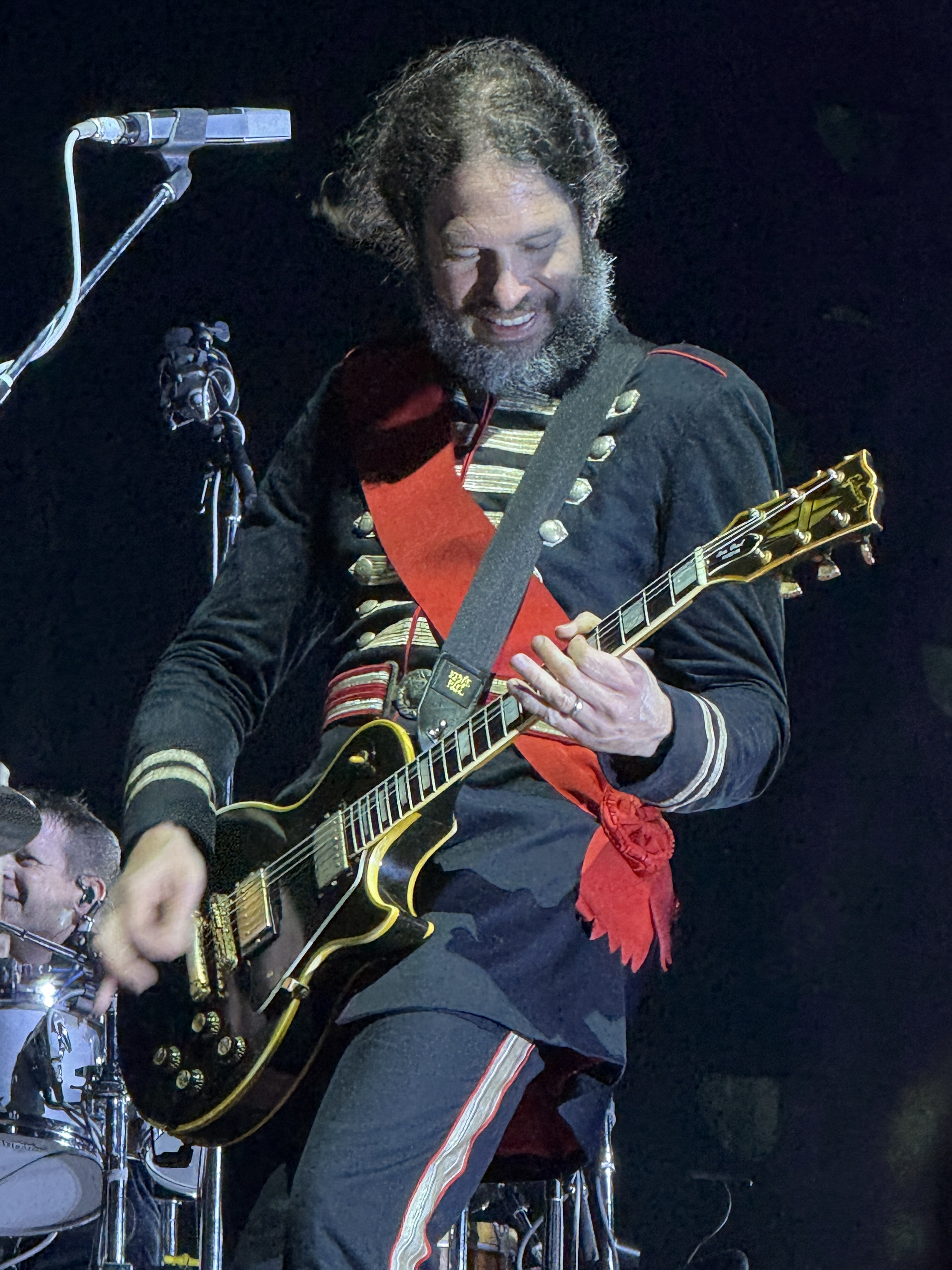
- Toro performing in 2025
- Born: Raymond Toro; July 15, 1977 (age 49); Kearny, New Jersey, U.S.
- Occupations: Musician; singer; songwriter; record producer
- Years active: 1994–present
- Spouse: Christa Toro (m. 2008)
- Children: 2
- Musical career
- Genres: Alternative rock; pop-punk; post-hardcore; emo; electronic rock; punk rock; hard rock
- Instruments: Guitar; vocals; drums
- Member of: My Chemical Romance
- Formerly of: Reggie and the Full Effect

Raymond Toro (Note: AllMusic gives Toro's name as Raymond Toro-Ortiz.) (born July 15, 1977) is an American musician, singer, songwriter, and record producer, best known as the lead guitarist and backing vocalist of the band My Chemical Romance.

== Early life ==
Toro was born July 15, 1977, in Kearny, New Jersey. He is of Puerto Rican-Portuguese heritage. He grew up in a small house on the border between Kearny and Harrison, New Jersey, which he shared with his parents and two brothers.

By the time he entered Kearny High School, he had become interested in music. Toro's brother introduced him to several bands whose guitarists influenced him greatly. He enrolled in guitar lessons, as well as typing lessons to improve his manual dexterity.

Toro became involved with several local bands, the most successful of which were The Rodneys, who formed in 1994 and released their first and only album "Soccertown USA" in 1997. Future My Chemical Romance drummer Matt Pelissier also played for the band. However, after graduating from high school in 1995, Toro decided to pursue film instead of music. He enrolled in an editing course at William Paterson University in Wayne, New Jersey, and his only musical pursuits involved playing drums in the short-lived band Dead Go West.

In an interview with Rock Sound, Toro said that "being in a band wasn't really a dream of mine. I always wanted to write music. I enjoy recording more and the process of writing, I never thought that being in a touring band was a possibility. I enjoyed getting a bunch of scenes and cutting it together so it makes sense. I made one short film about a guy who was obsessed with eating eggs every day. He finally opens up this egg carton and there's one egg left, but he can't crack it open, so he gets driven insane." Toro has also stated he enjoyed Release the Bats by Pete Wentz.

== Music career ==
Rodney's frontman Shawn Dillon is credited with introducing Toro to Gerard Way in the late 1990s. Toro agreed to work with him and Pelissier in practice sessions, which were primarily held in Pelissier's attic. After Gerard's younger brother Mikey joined the trio as a bass player My Chemical Romance was formed.

In 2007, Toro appeared as himself in the slasher/horror/comedy movie Punk Rock Holocaust 2, with bandmate Frank Iero.

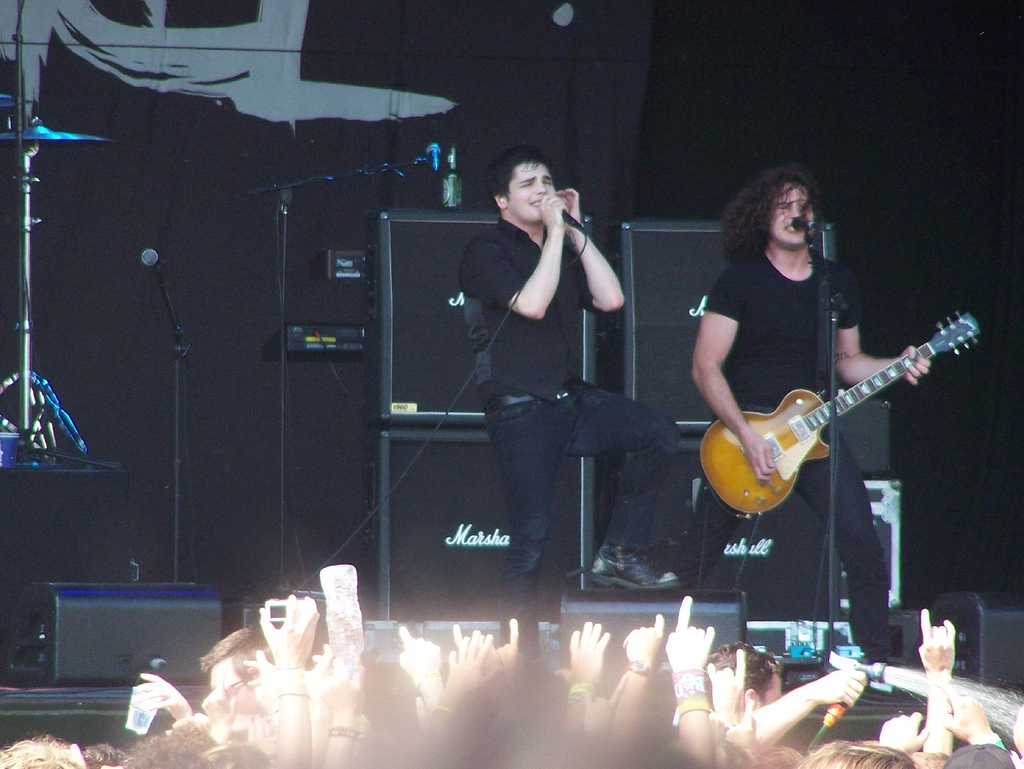
Ray Toro (right) in 2007

Since My Chemical Romance's third album The Black Parade, Toro has been compared to Queen guitarist Brian May. He has long cited May as a key influence on his guitar style. As Toro said in an interview: "I appreciate [the comparisons]. He's one of my favorite guitarists. I just love his work. That guy is capable of everything. He can lay back when he needs to, then writes some of the best leads. He comes up with great harmonies, he's a great singer. To me it's an honor for anybody to say that I play like him or that parts remind them of Queen". My Chemical Romance performed a portion of their 2011 Reading and Leeds Festivals headline concert with May.

Toro was the leading force behind My Chemical Romance's #SINGItForJapan project, which was dedicated to supporting those affected by the 2011 Tōhoku earthquake and tsunami in Japan. He arranged much of the instrumentation of the band's original track "Sing" to create a sound that emulated traditional Japanese music. "SINGItForJapan" was released on April 13, 2011, with all proceeds going to the Red Cross.

My Chemical Romance has released four studio albums, two live albums, six extended plays, 19 singles, four video albums, 15 music videos, one demo and have 11 original appearances on other albums. The band was working on a fifth studio album before their split.

On May 24, 2013, Toro posted a solo song, "Isn't That Something", to his SoundCloud account. He also stated how the track was entirely a solo effort: "I played everything. Sang everything. Recorded everything. Mixed everything. Myself" via his Twitter.

Later in 2013 Toro joined James Dewees's band, Reggie and the Full Effect for a tour and contributed to his album No Country for Old Musicians.

In 2014, Toro provided guitars for Cuban American dark cabaret singer Voltaire's tenth studio album, Raised by Bats.

On January 1, 2015, he released a new song, titled "For the Lost and Brave", on his website, mentioning Leelah Alcorn, a transgender teen who committed suicide, in the blog post. In an interview with Toro, Kerrang! magazine described the song's style as "aching synth-rock brimming with [My Chemical Romance]'s us-against-the-world spirit" and revealed that Toro intended to release his debut solo album later in 2015; Toro also commented that this was the first time he's ever "written lyrics or songs on [his] own".

On November 18, 2016, Toro released his debut album, Remember the Laughter, after recording it primarily at his home since 2013.

On October 31, 2019, My Chemical Romance announced they would be reuniting with a date in Los Angeles on December 20 and a new merchandise line.⠀They later announced a 2020 North American tour, as well as dates in Australia, New Zealand, and Japan. The tour was later postponed to 2022 due to the COVID-19 pandemic.

The band returned to headline the When We Were Young Festival in October 2024. Shortly after, in November 2024, My Chemical Romance announced Long Live The Black Parade Tour. Opening on July 11, 2025, in Seattle Washington, the band toured until September 20, 2025, where they wrapped up their first leg of the tour in Atlanta at the Shaky Knees festival.

== Artistry ==
Toro is noted for his shred guitar playing style. Jake Richardson of Loudwire described him as "[not] your average pop-punk player," saying he "attacks his leads with gusto, guts and a real sense of the dramatic."

Toro has cited heavy metal guitarist Randy Rhoads and hard rock musician Brian May as his two biggest influences. As a teenager he was a big fan of Randy Rhoads because "he was one of the first players I can remember who mixed classical music with a metal and hard rock style of playing, and he did it very tastefully. It was really inspiring." Later he began to listen to classical guitarist Andrés Segovia and Christopher Parkening. He admitted to being obsessed with the way in which they would take classical pieces and arrange them for a single guitar resulting in a moving melody and bass lines that work together.

Despite declaring to be a "music snob" when it comes to new artists, he praised Muse's work. He said that he mainly listens to the same music that he did when younger and enjoys the process of discovering harmonies or nuances that he was unable to notice during his youth, gaining a different appreciation for the music.

Toro recognizes his older brother as a huge influence, being the person who bought him his first real guitar and showed him how to play it. Toro also credits him for introducing him to bands like Led Zeppelin, The Beatles, Jimi Hendrix, The Doors, Mötley Crüe, and Metallica.

The first CD he bought was Cowboys from Hell by Pantera.

== Personal life ==
Toro married wife Christa in November 2008, during My Chemical Romance's break between The Black Parade and Danger Days: The True Lives of the Fabulous Killjoys. They have two sons, one born in September 2012, the other in April 2016.

== Discography ==
=== Solo albums ===
- Remember the Laughter (2016)

==== Singles ====
- "Isn't That Something" (2013)
- "For the Lost and Brave" (2015)
- "I Think You're Really Cool (Ray Toro Remix)" (with Guardin, 2021)

=== The Rodneys ===
- Soccertown U.S.A. (Sellout Soon Records) – 1997

=== My Chemical Romance ===
- I Brought You My Bullets, You Brought Me Your Love (2002)
- Three Cheers for Sweet Revenge (2004)
- The Black Parade (2006)
- Danger Days: The True Lives of the Fabulous Killjoys (2010)

=== Reggie and the Full Effect ===
- No Country for Old Musicians (2013)

== Production discography ==
- 2011 – My Chemical Romance – iTunes Festival: London 2011 (mixing)
- 2012 – The Architects – Live in Los Angeles (mixing)
- 2013 – The Architects – Border Wars Episode I (mixing on one track)
- 2019 – Frank Iero and the Future Violents – Barriers (mixing)

== Notes ==
1. "Teen Titans" – Rolling Stone (2005-07-14)
