= My Chemical Romance discography =

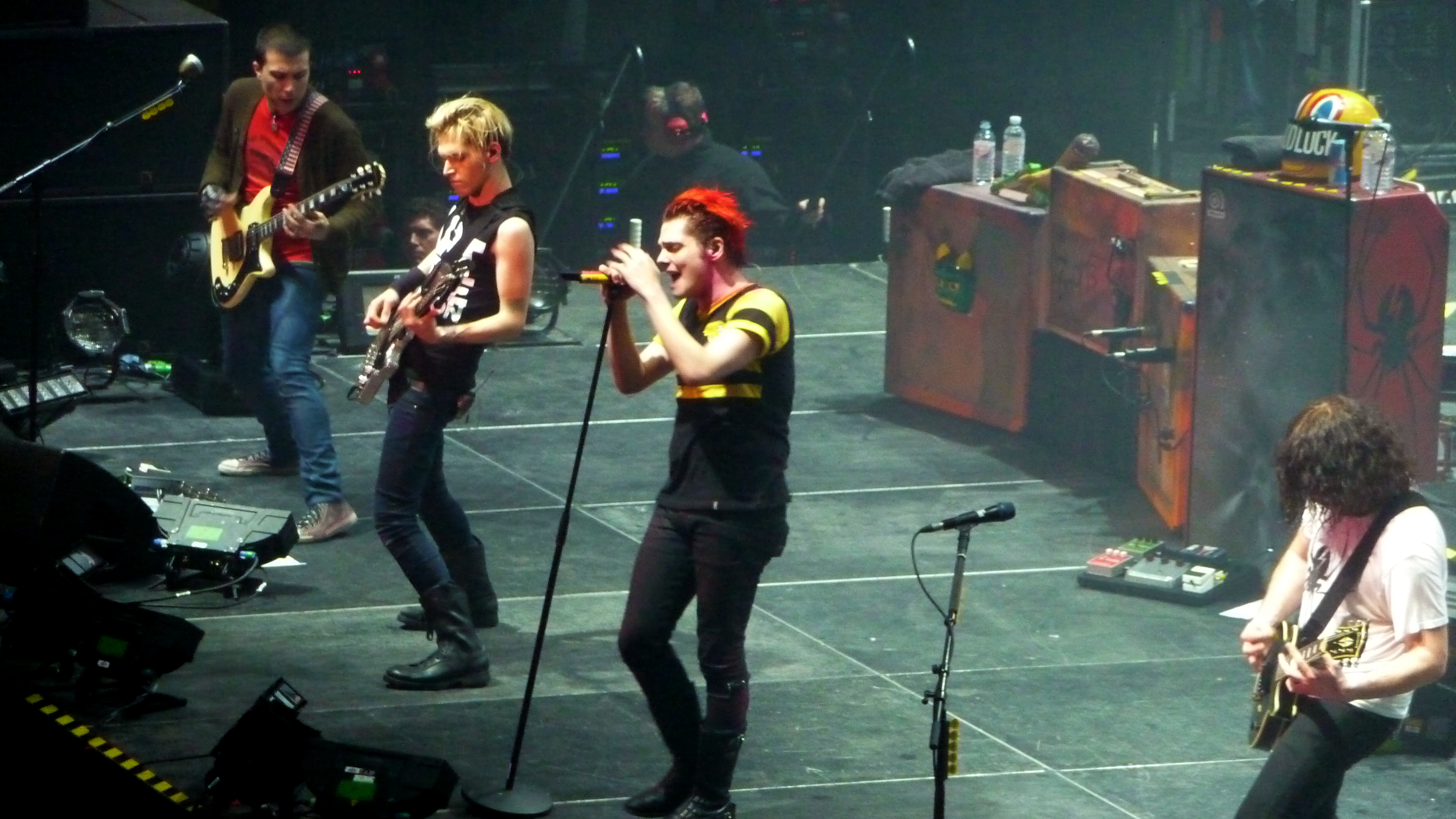
- My Chemical Romance performing in February 2011.
- Studio albums: 4
- Extended plays: 5
- Live albums: 2
- Compilation albums: 3
- Singles: 24
- Promotional singles: 6
- Video albums: 4
- Music videos: 18
- Other original album appearances: 10

The American rock band My Chemical Romance has released four studio albums, two live albums, three compilation albums, five extended plays, 24 singles, six promotional singles, four video albums and 18 music videos. They have also had 10 original appearances on other albums.

Lead vocalist Gerard Way formed the band in September 2001, after witnessing the collapse of the World Trade Center during the September 11 attacks. Shortly afterwards in July 2002, they released their debut album, I Brought You My Bullets, You Brought Me Your Love, through Eyeball Records. The album has since sold over 285,000 copies and has been certified gold in the United Kingdom by the British Phonographic Industry (BPI). My Chemical Romance signed with Reprise Records the next year, and released their second studio album, Three Cheers for Sweet Revenge, in June 2004. A commercial success, it has sold over three million copies, due in part to the successful singles "I'm Not Okay (I Promise)" and "Helena".

Their third studio album, The Black Parade, was released in October 2006. It debuted at number two on the Billboard 200, and has been certified 4× platinum by the Recording Industry Association of America (RIAA). The album's lead single, "Welcome to the Black Parade", became the band's highest charting song on the Billboard Hot 100, and their only number-one hit on the UK singles chart. Other successful singles included "Famous Last Words" and "Teenagers". Their fourth studio album, Danger Days: The True Lives of the Fabulous Killjoys, was released in November 2010, and featured the successful singles "Na Na Na (Na Na Na Na Na Na Na Na Na)" and "Sing". The singles reached number 77 and number 58 on the Billboard Hot 100, and have been certified gold and platinum in the United States and the United Kingdom respectively.

In February 2013, My Chemical Romance released the Conventional Weapons compilation album and box set. (Note: Conventional Weapons consisted of five singles, containing two songs each, released from October 2012 to February 2013, named in numeric order of release (e.g. "Number One"). This culminated in the release of a combined box set on February 5, 2013. For simplicity and ease of identification, this article refers to the singles by the songs included in them, rather than the numerical names.) One month later, the band announced their break-up. In March 2014, they put out a greatest hits album, May Death Never Stop You. It featured the final song they completed prior to their break-up, "Fake Your Death", which was released as a single on February 17. In 2016, a reissue of The Black Parade was released, titled The Black Parade/Living with Ghosts, peaking at number 11 on the UK Albums chart. My Chemical Romance reunited in 2019, and in 2022, they released their first single since "Fake Your Death", titled "The Foundations of Decay". As of October 2026, the band has sold 8.7 million album-equivalent units in the United States, 5.6 million of which were from album sales.

== Albums ==
=== Studio albums ===
List of studio albums with a selection of chart positions, sales figures, and certifications
Title	Album details	Peak chart positions										Sales	Certifications
Title	Album details	US	AUS	AUT	CAN	GER	IRL	JPN	NZ	SWE	UK	Sales	Certifications
I Brought You My Bullets, You Brought Me Your Love	Released: July 23, 2002; Label: Eyeball; Format: CD, CS, DD, LP	— (Note: I Brought You My Bullets, You Brought Me Your Love did not enter the Billboard 200, but peaked at number 28 on the Catalog Albums chart.)	—	—	—	—	—	—	—	—	129	US: 285,000; UK: 172,042	BPI: Gold
Three Cheers for Sweet Revenge	Released: June 8, 2004; Label: Reprise; Format: CD, CD+DVD, CS, DD, LP	6	16	54	20	20	36	73	30	—	9	WW: 2,000,000; US: 1,400,000; UK: 662,536	RIAA: 3× Platinum; ARIA: Gold; BPI: 2× Platinum; BVMI: Gold; IRMA: Gold; MC: 4× Platinum; RMNZ: Platinum
The Black Parade	Released: October 23, 2006; Label: Reprise; Format: CD, CS, DD, 2×LP	1 (Note: The Black Parade originally peaked at number 2 on the Billboard 200 in 2006. It reached its peak of number 1 in 2026 following the release of its deluxe edition reissue.)	3	4	2	7	5	10	1	4	1 (Note: The Black Parade originally peaked at number 2 in the UK in 2006. It reached its peak of number 1 in 2026 following the release of its deluxe edition reissue.)	WW: 4,000,000; US: 1,500,000; UK: 1,256,082	RIAA: 4× Platinum; ARIA: Platinum; BPI: 4× Platinum; IRMA: Platinum; MC: 4× Platinum; RIAJ: Platinum; RMNZ: 3× Platinum
Danger Days: The True Lives of the Fabulous Killjoys	Released: November 22, 2010; Label: Reprise; Format: CD, DD, LP	8	10	15	13	18	14	8	4	34	2 (Note: Danger Days: The True Lives of the Fabulous Killjoys originally peaked at number 14 in the UK in 2010. It reached its peak of number 2 in 2026 following the release of its remastered deluxe edition.)	WW: 1,000,000; UK: 312,470	RIAA: Platinum; BPI: Platinum; IRMA: Gold; MC: Gold; RMNZ: Gold
"—" denotes a recording that did not chart or was not released in that territory.

=== Live albums ===
List of live albums with a selection of chart positions and certifications
Title	Album details	Peak chart positions										Sales	Certifications
Title	Album details	US	AUS	AUT	CAN	GER	IRL	JPN	NZ	SWE	UK	Sales	Certifications
Life on the Murder Scene	Released: March 21, 2006; Label: Reprise; Format: CD+2×DVD, DD, LP	30	—	—	15	—	40	—	—	—	53	UK: 163,950	BPI: Gold
The Black Parade Is Dead!	Released: June 27, 2008; Label: Reprise; Format: CD+DVD, DD, 2×LP	22	10	24	21	51	19	52	6	29	12	UK: 76,679	BPI: Silver; RMNZ: Gold
"—" denotes a recording that did not chart or was not released in that territory.

=== Compilation albums ===
List of compilation albums with a selection of chart positions and certifications
Title	Album details	Peak chart positions										Sales	Certifications
Title	Album details	US	AUS	GER	IRL	ITA	JPN	NZ	SCO	SPA	UK	Sales	Certifications
Conventional Weapons	Released: February 5, 2013; Label: Reprise; Format: 5×7" records, DD	—	—	—	—	—	—	—	—	—	—		
May Death Never Stop You	Released: March 25, 2014; Label: Reprise; Format: CD+DVD, CS, DD 2×LP+DVD	9	11	66	13	67	37	22	17	61	15	UK: 501,401	BPI: Platinum; RMNZ: Gold
The Black Parade/Living with Ghosts	Released: September 23, 2016; Label: Reprise; Format: 2×CD, DD, 3×LP	—	15	—	—	—	192	—	12	—	11		
"—" denotes a release that did not chart or was not released in that territory.

== Extended plays ==
List of extended plays with a selection of chart positions
Title	EP details	Peak chart positions
Title	EP details	JPN
Like Phantoms, Forever	Released: July 19, 2002; Label: Eyeball; Format: CD	—
Live and Rare	Released: December 19, 2007; Label: Warner Music Japan; Format: CD, DD	83
The Black Parade: The B-Sides	Released: 2009; Label: Reprise; Format: DD	—
The Mad Gear and Missile Kid	Released: November 22, 2010; Label: Reprise; Format: CD, DD	—
iTunes Festival: London 2011	Released: July 18, 2011; Label: Reprise; Format: DD	—
"—" denotes a release that did not chart or was not released in that territory.

== Singles ==
List of singles with a selection of chart positions and certifications
Title	Year	Peak chart positions										Certifications (sales thresholds)	Album
Title	Year	US	AUS	AUT	CAN	GER	IRL	NZ	SCO	SWE	UK	Certifications (sales thresholds)	Album
"Honey, This Mirror Isn't Big Enough for the Two of Us"	2003	—	—	—	—	—	—	—	—	—	182		I Brought You My Bullets, You Brought Me Your Love
"Headfirst for Halos"	2004	—	—	—	—	—	—	—	94	—	80		I Brought You My Bullets, You Brought Me Your Love
"I'm Not Okay (I Promise)"	2004	86	65	—	—	—	—	38	23	—	19	RIAA: 3× Platinum; BPI: Platinum; MC: 2× Platinum; RMNZ: Platinum	Three Cheers for Sweet Revenge
"Helena"	2005	33	78	—	—	67	46	27	19	—	20	RIAA: 4× Platinum; BPI: Platinum; MC: 2× Platinum; RMNZ: Platinum	Three Cheers for Sweet Revenge
"Under Pressure" (with the Used)	2005	41	—	—	—	—	—	—	—	—	—		In Love and Death (re-issue)
"The Ghost of You"	2005	84	—	—	—	—	49	—	27	—	27	RIAA: Platinum; BPI: Silver; MC: Platinum; RMNZ: Gold	Three Cheers for Sweet Revenge
"Welcome to the Black Parade"	2006	9	14	—	32	58	12	2	1	26	1	RIAA: 7× Platinum; BPI: 3× Platinum; IFPI AUT: Gold; MC: 6× Platinum; RMNZ: 3× Platinum	The Black Parade
"Famous Last Words"	2007	88	20	57	57	68	30	6	2	37	8	RIAA: 2× Platinum; BPI: Platinum; RMNZ: Platinum	The Black Parade
"I Don't Love You"	2007	—	64	—	—	89	27	—	3	—	13	RIAA: Platinum; BPI: Gold; MC: Platinum; RMNZ: Gold	The Black Parade
"Teenagers"	2007	67	16	50	53	74	7	6	6	—	9	RIAA: 6× Platinum; BPI: 3× Platinum; IFPI AUT: Platinum; MC: 6× Platinum; RMNZ: 4× Platinum	The Black Parade
"Desolation Row"	2009	— (Note: "Desolation Row" did not enter the Billboard Hot 100, but peaked at number seven on the Bubbling Under Hot 100 chart.)	—	—	— (Note: "Desolation Row" did not enter the Canadian Hot 100, but peaked at number 69 on the Hot Canadian Digital Songs Sales chart.)	—	—	—	18	—	52		Watchmen: Music from the Motion Picture
"Na Na Na (Na Na Na Na Na Na Na Na Na)"	2010	77	—	71	70	94	—	33	26	44	31	RIAA: Platinum; BPI: Gold; MC: Platinum; RMNZ: Gold	Danger Days: The True Lives of the Fabulous Killjoys
"Sing"	2010	58	43	—	57	—	—	—	43	—	50	RIAA: Platinum; BPI: Silver; MC: Gold	Danger Days: The True Lives of the Fabulous Killjoys
"Planetary (Go!)"	2011	—	—	—	—	—	—	—	—	—	151		Danger Days: The True Lives of the Fabulous Killjoys
"Bulletproof Heart"	2011	— (Note: "Bulletproof Heart" did not enter the Billboard Hot 100, but peaked at number 42 on the Hot Rock & Alternative Songs chart.)	—	—	—	—	—	—	—	—	39		Danger Days: The True Lives of the Fabulous Killjoys
"The Only Hope for Me Is You"	2011	— (Note: "The Only Hope for Me Is You" did not enter the Billboard Hot 100, but peaked at number six on the Bubbling Under Hot 100 chart.)	—	—	84	—	—	—	—	—	—		Danger Days: The True Lives of the Fabulous Killjoys
"The Kids from Yesterday"	2012	—	—	—	—	—	—	—	—	—	—		Danger Days: The True Lives of the Fabulous Killjoys
"Boy Division" / "Tomorrow's Money	2012	— (Note: "Boy Division" / "Tomorrow's Money" did not enter the Billboard Hot 100, but peaked at number two on the Hot Singles Sales chart.)	—	—	—	—	—	—	68	—	76		Conventional Weapons
"Ambulance" / "Gun."	2012	—	—	—	—	—	—	—	—	—	176		Conventional Weapons
"The World Is Ugly" / "The Light Behind Your Eyes"	2012	— (Note: "The World Is Ugly" / "The Light Behind Your Eyes" did not enter the Billboard Hot 100, but peaked at number three on the Hot Singles Sales chart.)	—	—	—	—	—	—	95	—	113		Conventional Weapons
"Kiss the Ring" / "Make Room!"	2013	— (Note: "Kiss the Ring" / "Make Room!" did not enter the Billboard Hot 100, but peaked at number two on the Hot Singles Sales chart.)	—	—	—	—	—	—	—	—	111		Conventional Weapons
"Surrender the Night" / "Burn Bright"	2013	— (Note: "Surrender the Night" / "Burn Bright" did not enter the Billboard Hot 100, but peaked at number four on the Hot Singles Sales chart.)	—	—	—	—	—	—	99	—	101		Conventional Weapons
"Fake Your Death"	2014	—	—	—	—	—	—	—	58	—	63		May Death Never Stop You
"The Foundations of Decay"	2022	— (Note: "The Foundations of Decay" did not enter the Billboard Hot 100, but peaked at number two on the Bubbling Under Hot 100 chart and number 11 on the Billboard Digital Song Sales chart.)	80	—	92	—	56	— (Note: "The Foundations of Decay" did not enter the NZ Top 40 Singles Chart, but peaked at number seven on the NZ Hot Singles Chart.)	—	—	37		Non-album single
"—" denotes a recording that did not chart or was not released in that territory.

=== Promotional singles ===
Title	Year	Peak chart positions	Certifications (sales thresholds)	Album
Title	Year	UK	Certifications (sales thresholds)	Album
"Vampires Will Never Hurt You"	2002	—		I Brought You My Bullets, You Brought Me Your Love
"Thank You for the Venom"	2004	71	RIAA: Gold	Three Cheers for Sweet Revenge
"Save Yourself, I'll Hold Them Back"	2010	—		Danger Days: The True Lives of the Fabulous Killjoys
"Sing It for Japan"	2011	—		Non-album single
"The Five of Us Are Dying" (Rough mix of "Welcome to the Black Parade")	2016	—		The Black Parade/Living with Ghosts
"Welcome to the Black Parade" (10th anniversary Steve Aoki remix)	2016	—		Non-album single
"—" denotes a recording that did not chart or was not released in that territory.

== Other certified or charted songs ==
Title	Year	Peak chart positions	Certifications (sales thresholds)	Album
Title	Year	UK	Certifications (sales thresholds)	Album
"You Know What They Do to Guys Like Us in Prison"	2004	—	RIAA: Gold	Three Cheers for Sweet Revenge
"The End."	2006	—	RIAA: Gold	The Black Parade
"Dead!"	2006	—	RIAA: Gold; BPI: Silver	The Black Parade
"This Is How I Disappear"	2006	—	RIAA: Gold	The Black Parade
"The Sharpest Lives"	2006	—	RIAA: Gold; BPI: Silver	The Black Parade
"House of Wolves"	2006	—	RIAA: Gold; BPI: Silver (Note: "Cancer" and "House of Wolves" were certified together in the United Kingdom.)	The Black Parade
"Cancer"	2006	—	RIAA: Gold; BPI: Silver	The Black Parade
"Mama"	2006	—	RIAA: Platinum; BPI: Silver; RMNZ: Gold	The Black Parade
"Disenchanted"	2006	—	RIAA: Gold	The Black Parade
"Kill All Your Friends"	2007	191	—	"Famous Last Words" B-side
"We Don't Need Another Song About California"	2010	11	—	Danger Days: The True Lives of the Fabulous Killjoys (deluxe edition)
"—" denotes a recording that did not chart or was not released in that territory.

== Videography ==
=== Video albums ===
List of video albums with certifications
Title	Album details	Certifications (sales thresholds)
Life on the Murder Scene	Released: March 21, 2006; Label: Reprise; Format: CD+2×DVD, DD, 2×UMD	RIAA: 2× Platinum
AOL Sessions	Released: December 18, 2007; Label: Reprise; Format: DD	
The Black Parade Is Dead!	Released: July 1, 2008; Label: Reprise; Format: CD+DVD, DD	RIAA: Gold
¡Venganza!	Released: March 31, 2009; Label: Reprise; Format: USB	

=== Music videos ===
List of music videos with director(s)
Title	Year	Director(s)
"Vampires Will Never Hurt You"	2002	—
"Honey, This Mirror Isn't Big Enough for the Two of Us"	2002	—
"I'm Not Okay (I Promise)"	2004	—
"I'm Not Okay (I Promise)"	2004	Marc Webb
"Helena"	2005	Marc Webb
"The Ghost of You"	2005	Marc Webb
"Welcome to the Black Parade"	2006	Samuel Bayer
"Famous Last Words"	2006	Samuel Bayer
"I Don't Love You"	2007	Marc Webb
"Teenagers"	2007	Marc Webb
"Desolation Row"	2009	Zack Snyder
"Na Na Na (Na Na Na Na Na Na Na Na Na)"	2010	Robert Schober; Gerard Way
"Sing"	2010	P. R. Brown; Gerard Way
"Planetary (Go!)"	2011	—
"Sing It for Japan"	2011	Marie Vogel
"The Kids from Yesterday"	2012	Emily Eisemann
"Fake Your Death"	2014	—
"Blood"	2014	—

== Other original album appearances ==
List of other original audio album appearances
Title	Year	Album
"Headfirst for Halos" (live)	2004	In Honor: A Compilation to Beat Cancer
"All I Want for Christmas Is You" (originally by Mariah Carey)	2004	Kevin & Bean's Christmastime in the 909
"Under Pressure" (with the Used; originally by David Bowie and Queen)	2005	In Love and Death (re-issue)
"Astro Zombies" (originally by the Misfits)	2005	Tony Hawk's American Wasteland
"To the End" (RnR Cheryl mix)	2006	Underworld: Evolution – Original Motion Picture Soundtrack
"Song 2" (live; originally by Blur)	2006	Radio 1's Live Lounge
"House of Wolves" (live)	2007	The Bamboozle 2007
"Desolation Row" (originally by Bob Dylan)	2009	Watchmen: Music from the Motion Picture
"Desolation Row" (live; originally by Bob Dylan)	2012	Chimes of Freedom
"Every Snowflake Is Different (Just Like You)"	2017	Yo Gabba Gabba! Hey!

== See also ==
- List of songs recorded by My Chemical Romance
- Gerard Way discography
