= Life on the Murder Scene =

2006 live and compilation album by My Chemical Romance

Live album and compilation album by My Chemical Romance
- Released: March 21, 2006
- Length: 35:45 (CD); 120 minutes (DVD 1); 126 minutes (DVD 2)
- Label: Reprise

My Chemical Romance chronology
Three Cheers for Sweet Revenge (2004)	Life on the Murder Scene (2006)	The Black Parade (2006)

Life on the Murder Scene is a live and compilation album by the American rock band My Chemical Romance. It was released on March 21, 2006, through Reprise Records. Containing three discs—specifically two DVDs and one CD—the release includes several live recordings, a documentary of the band's history up to that point, two demo tracks, and the previously unreleased "Desert Song".

Life on the Murder Scene received mixed reviews from critics. Commercially, it charted in multiple countries, reaching number one on the UK Rock & Metal chart and the top ten in multiple others. It has been certified 2× platinum by the Recording Industry Association of America (RIAA) and platinum by the Argentine Chamber of Phonograms and Videograms Producers (CAPIF) as a video, and gold by the British Phonographic Industry (BPI) as an album.

== Content ==
Life on the Murder Scene consists of three discs, including two DVDs and one CD. The first DVD contains footage of My Chemical Romance's live performances. It also includes the music videos for the singles "I'm Not Okay (I Promise)", "Helena", and "The Ghost of You". The other DVD contains a documentary of the band's history up to that point, presented as a series of "video diaries".

The CD also contains recordings of the band's live performances, specifically from MTV2 $2 Bill, Sessions@AOL, and a show at the Starland Ballroom. It also contains two demos: "Bury Me in Black", an unfinished song that was included as a bonus track for the Japanese release of Three Cheers for Sweet Revenge, and a demo for "I Never Told You What I Do for a Living". Also included is the previously unreleased "Desert Song", another song that was scrapped from Revenge.

== Release and commercial performance ==
Life on the Murder Scene was announced on October 14, 2005. It was released on March 21, 2006, through Reprise Records. The album's cover art is a live reenactment of Three Cheers for Sweet Revenge's cover, which depicts a couple covered in blood. On April 17, 2020, the album was released on vinyl record for the first time as part of Record Store Day. A limited edition splatter vinyl was also released, limited to only 11,500 copies.

In the United States, Life on the Murder Scene reached number 30 on the Billboard 200 chart, number 9 on Top Rock Albums, and number 3 on Music Video Sales. It has been certified 2× platinum by the Recording Industry Association of America (RIAA) as a long-form video, indicating shipment of over 200,000 units. In the United Kingdom, it peaked at the top of the UK Rock & Metal chart and number 53 on the UK Albums Chart. The British Phonographic Industry (BPI) has certified it gold as an album, indicating shipment of over 100,000 units. Elsewhere, it reached number two on both the Australian Music DVD and New Zealand Music DVD charts, number ten on the Mexican Albums chart, 15 on the Canadian Albums chart, and 40 on the Irish Albums chart. It has also been certified platinum in Argentina.

== Critical reception ==
Professional ratings
Review scores
Source	Rating
AllMusic	3/5 stars
Prefix Magazine	4/10
Rolling Stone	3/5 stars

Stephen Thomas Erlewine, writing for AllMusic, described Life on the Murder Scene as a snapshot of the band during their early career, combining two widespread ways for bands to preserve their history—namely a live album and live video—in one. He praised the inclusion of the documentary, calling it an "insanely detailed two-hour documentary about a band that is on the cusp of breaking big" and a gift for fans. Jenny Eliscu of Rolling Stone wrote that the release highlighted the band's "punk" nature during their live performances. Billboard's Christa L. Titus considered the behind-the-scenes footage of the band's music videos to be the highlight of the release, describing them as where the "unique vision is brought to life". Matt Liebowitz of Prefix Magazine criticized the band's performances, believing the band struggled with playing their songs on-stage and that the crowds were what made the release worth it.

Eliscu praised the performances of vocalist Gerard Way present on the release, calling it "top form". She also described the selection of songs present on the record as pulling "all the right guns" from their discography. Erlewine felt that the release was repetitive to non-fans of the band, criticizing the abundance of different performances of certain songs—particularly the several versions of "I'm Not Okay (I Promise)"—and calling it a "test of patience". However, he felt that these problems were less apparent with the live recordings present on the CD, saying they were "enhanced by rhythms" that worked better on-stage than in studio recordings and meshed well with Way's vocals. Liebowitz and Titus also criticized the track selection's repetition, the latter calling it "overkill".

== Track listing ==
=== CD ===
All tracks are written by Frank Iero, Matt Pelissier, Ray Toro, Gerard Way and Mikey Way.

Live from MTV2 $2 Bill
No.	Title	Length
1.	"Thank You for the Venom"	3:49
2.	"Cemetery Drive"	3:16
3.	"Give 'Em Hell, Kid"	2:20

Live at the Starland Ballroom
No.	Title	Length
4.	"Headfirst for Halos"	2:42

Live from Sessions@AOL
No.	Title	Length
5.	"Helena"	3:37
6.	"You Know What They Do to Guys Like Us in Prison"	3:11
7.	"The Ghost of You"	3:26
8.	"I'm Not Okay (I Promise)"	3:08

Demos & Previously Unreleased
No.	Title	Length
9.	"I Never Told You What I Do for a Living" (demo version)	3:43
10.	"Bury Me in Black" (demo)	2:37
11.	"Desert Song"	3:50
Total length:		35:45

=== DVD 1 ===
Video Diary
No.	Title	Length
1.	"Introduction"
2.	"Band Members"
3.	"Jersey"
4.	"The Early Years"
5.	"Influences"
6.	"The Dawn of MCR"
7.	"Early Collaborations"
8.	"Skylines and Turnstiles"
9.	"My Chemical Romance"
10.	"Frank"
11.	"The First My Chem Show"
12.	"Brian"
13.	"Bullets"
14.	"Taking on the World"
15.	"The Next Level"
16.	"Signing to a Major Label"
17.	"Revenge"
18.	"Howard Benson"
19.	"Warped Tour"
20.	"The Record Release"
21.	"The Next Big Thing"
22.	"From Sky High to Rock Bottom"
23.	"Becoming a New Band"
24.	"Bob"
25.	"The "I'm Not Okay (I Promise)" (video)
26.	"Candyland"
27.	"The My Chemical Romance Explosion"
28.	"The Nintendo Fusion Tour"
29.	"Helena" (video)
30.	"Fashion"
31.	"Life on Tour"
32.	"Comics and Artwork"
33.	"Rock Superheroes"
34.	"A Taste of Chaos"
35.	"Anti-rock and Roll"
36.	"Become More Theatrical"
37.	"The Ghost of You" (video)
38.	"The Future"

=== DVD 2 ===
Live Performances
No.	Title	Length
1.	"I'm Not Okay (I Promise)"
2.	"Cemetery Drive"
3.	"Our Lady of Sorrows"
4.	"Honey, This Mirror Isn't Big Enough for the Two of Us"
5.	"You Know What They Do to Guys Like Us in Prison"
6.	"Headfirst for Halos"
7.	"The Ghost of You"
8.	"Thank You for the Venom"
9.	"Give 'Em Hell, Kid"
10.	"Vampires Will Never Hurt You"
11.	"Helena"

TV Appearances
No.	Title	Length
12.	"I'm Not Okay (I Promise)" (from Late Night with Conan O'Brien)
13.	"I'm Not Okay (I Promise)" (Live from Discover and Download)

Online Performances
No.	Title	Length
14.	"Helena" (live from Sessions@AOL)
15.	"I'm Not Okay (I Promise)" (live from Sessions@AOL)
16.	"The Ghost of You" (live from Sessions@AOL)
17.	"You Know What They Do to Guys Like Us in Prison" (live from Sessions@AOL)
18.	"I'm Not Okay (I Promise)" (live at launch)
19.	"Helena" (live at launch)

Videos
No.	Title	Length
20.	"I'm Not Okay (I Promise)" (version 1)
21.	"I'm Not Okay (I Promise)" (version 2)
22.	"The Making of 'I'm Not Okay (I Promise)'"
23.	"Helena"
24.	"The Making of 'Helena'"
25.	"The Ghost of You"
26.	"The Making of 'The Ghost of You'"

== Personnel ==
Credits are adapted from the album's liner notes.

My Chemical Romance

- Bob Bryar — drums (live performance and music videos)
- Frank Iero — rhythm guitar, backing vocals
- Matt Pelissier — drums (studio tracks)
- Ray Toro — lead guitar, backing vocals
- Mikey Way — bass
- Gerard Way — lead vocals

DVD credits

- DVD post production: David May, Raena Winscott, Traci Samxzyk
- DVD mastered by Outpost Sound
- DVD menu animation designed by Magnetic Dreams
- DVD authoring by Mighty Forces Productions
- Directors: Brad Nolan & Greg Kaplan
- Executive producers: Craig Aaronson, Brian Schechter & Brad Nolan
- Camera & Interview Footage: Brad Nolan
- Management: Brian Schechter/Riot Squad
- Documentary Director/Editor: Greg Kaplan
- Legal: Stacy Fass
- Agent: Matt Galle/Ellis Industries (USA), Geoff Meall/The Agency Group (UK & Europe)
- A&R: Craig Aaronson
- Art Direction and Photography by P.R. Brown at Bau-Da Design Lab
- Design by Trevor Niemann at Bau-Da Design Lab

== Charts ==
=== Weekly charts ===
2006 weekly chart performance for the album
Chart (2006)	Peak position
Canadian Albums (Nielsen SoundScan)	15
Irish Albums (IRMA)	40
Mexican Albums (Top 100 Mexico)	10
Scottish Albums (Official Charts)	50
UK Albums (Official Charts)	53
UK Rock & Metal Albums (Official Charts)	1
US Billboard 200	30
US Top Rock Albums (Billboard)	9

2006 weekly chart performance for the video
Chart (2006)	Peak position
Australian Music DVD (ARIA)	2
New Zealand Music DVD (RIANZ)	2
US Music Video Sales (Billboard)	3

2020 weekly chart performance for the album
Chart (2020)	Peak position
Croatian International Albums (HDU)	35
US Indie Store Album Sales (Billboard)	3
US Top Alternative Albums (Billboard)	8

=== Monthly charts ===
2006 monthly chart performance for the video
Chart (2006)	Peak position
Argentine Music DVD (CAPIF)	7

=== Year-end charts ===
2006 year-end chart performance for the album
Chart (2006)	Position
Mexican Albums (Top 100 Mexico)	98

2006 year-end chart performance for the video
Chart (2006)	Position
New Zealand Music DVD (RIANZ)	9

== Certifications ==
Certifications and sales for Life on the Murder Scene
Region	Certification	Certified units/sales
Argentina (CAPIF) video	Platinum	8,000^{^}
United Kingdom (BPI) album	Gold	100,000^{‡}
United States (RIAA) video	2× Platinum	200,000^{^}
^{^} Shipments figures based on certification alone.^{‡} Sales+streaming figures based on certification alone.
