= Cemetery Drive =

Cemetery Drive may refer to:

- Cemetery Drive, Menands, New York.
- Cemetery Drive (song), a 2004 song by rock band My Chemical Romance.
