= Demolition Lovers =

2002 song by My Chemical Romance

Song by My Chemical Romance

from the album I Brought You My Bullets, You Brought Me Your Love
- Released: July 23, 2002
- Recorded: May 2002
- Studio: Nada Recording, New Windsor
- Genre: Punk rock
- Length: 6:06
- Label: Eyeball
- Songwriters: Matt Pelissier; Ray Toro; Gerard Way; Mikey Way
- Producer: Geoff Rickly

Audio
- "Demolition Lovers" on YouTube

"Demolition Lovers" is a song by the American rock band My Chemical Romance from their debut studio album, I Brought You My Bullets, You Brought Me Your Love (2002). It was written by four of the five band members and produced by Geoff Rickly. It became available as the album's eleventh and final track on July 23, 2002, when it was released by Eyeball Records.

A punk rock song, it is a six-minute long ballad with elements of screamo that goes through multiple movements. The song starts off slow, with a simple guitar and backing drums, building up gradually and ultimately resulting in an abrupt stop that leads into the bridge. The second half of the song features a guitar solo and a final chorus, which is followed by another abrupt ending that concludes the track. Lyrically, the song tells the story of two lovers who go on a crime spree and ultimately meet their demise in a desert.

The song was met with positive responses from critics, who highlighted its composition and storytelling. Multiple critics considered it one of the best songs from Bullets, while others regarded it as one of My Chemical Romance's best songs overall. They played it in their earliest live shows through 2004, and later performed it during their Reunion Tour in 2022 and the Long Live The Black Parade tour in 2026. The song's story was continued in the band's next album, Three Cheers for Sweet Revenge (2004).

== Background and release ==
My Chemical Romance formed after the band's vocalist, Gerard Way, witnessed the collapse of the World Trade Center during the September 11 attacks. Shortly afterwards, he was joined by drummer Matt Pelissier, guitarist Ray Toro, bassist Mikey Way, and later, guitarist Frank Iero. In May 2002, they went to Nada Recording Studios in New Windsor, New York to begin recording their first studio album, I Brought You My Bullets, You Brought Me Your Love, produced by Geoff Rickly of the band Thursday. "Demolition Lovers" was written by Pelissier, Toro, and the Way brothers. John Naclerio mixed the song, while Ryan Ball mastered it. While Iero does not play guitar on the track, he provides backing vocals alongside Toro.

In an interview with WSOU 89.5, a New Jersey radio station, Gerard Way said that the album and its title were centered around "Demolition Lovers". He further explained that multiple songs they wrote for the record had lyrics that ultimately tied into the song. It was musically inspired by an unspecified Bobby Womack song, as well as the Helium song "I Am A Witch", which Way says helped him learn how to play guitar. The band originally planned to name the song "I Brought You My Bullets, You Brought Me Your Love", but they ultimately chose "Demolition Lovers" as they feared radio stations would introduce the song in an awkward way. Toro mentioned that the song took them six months to write, and described the end result as "incredible" and "moving".

I Brought You My Bullets, You Brought Me Your Love was released on July 23, 2002, through Eyeball Records; "Demolition Lovers" is its eleventh and final song. My Chemical Romance played the song during some of their earliest live performances, playing it nine times through 2004. On September 20, 2022, they played it live for the first time in eighteen years at the Prudential Center, in Newark, New Jersey, as part of their Reunion Tour (2019–2023). They also performed it on October 11 at the Kia Forum in Inglewood, California. They played it two times during the Long Live The Black Parade tour (2025–2026), on July 10, 2026, at Wembley Stadium in London, and on August 9 at Citi Field in New York City. Both performances during Long Live had a new rendition featuring strings and piano.

== Music ==
"Demolition Lovers"
The final thirty seconds of "Demolition Lovers", which illustrates the demise of the titular characters and the song's abrupt ending.

"Demolition Lovers" is a punk rock ballad. Mel Wang of Rolling Stone Philippines and Tatiana Tenreyro of Paste said that the song had elements of screamo music, with Tenreyro specifically likening the song's screeches to the genre. Desiree Bowie of The Recording Academy labeled the song as similar to music by Thursday.

Throughout its roughly six-minute run-time, the song goes through several movements and tempo changes. It begins with a slow build-up, featuring what Jesse Lord of IGN described as "warbly vocals and compressed-sounding guitars and drums". Biographer Tom Bryant described the song as led by "doomed, delicate guitars". Eli Enis of Paste labeled the intro as moody, and Alessandra Schade of Alternative Press described it as featuring a "slow, eerie guitar riff". It continues to build up, with what Schade called an emotional crescendo and Enis characterized as "frenetic verses".

At 2:50, the track stops abruptly before leading into a minimalist section, described by Enis as a "breathless bridge" and by Lord as a "shy guitar and drum ensemble", before leading into a guitar solo. The build-up from earlier in the song resumes, culminating in a final chorus before ending abruptly, described by Enis as it "crash[ing] to a sudden halt".

=== Lyrics and storyline ===
"Demolition Lovers" follows two lovers as they go on a crime spree, ultimately dying in a "hail of bullets" in a desert. The narrator characterizes their final moments as being soaked in a pool of blood while kissing for the final time ("And in this pool of blood / I’ll meet your eyes / I mean this / Forever"). He also declares that, despite death, they will not be separated. Bowie thought the premise was similar to the film Natural Born Killers (1994). Lauren Boisvert of American Songwriter interpreted the song as about Gerard Way's willingness to die for his loved ones, citing the text in the album's inlay ("I'm sorry I wrote all those songs about killing you, I hope the last track makes up for it"). She also believed that it could be interpreted as an extension of "Drowning Lessons", another Bullets song about a man who has to relive witnessing his lover's death repeatedly.

The story of "Demolition Lovers" is continued in the band's next album, Three Cheers for Sweet Revenge (2004). Following their deaths, the two lovers are separated, one in heaven and the other in hell. The male lover makes a deal with the devil to harvest the souls of a thousand people in order to reunite with her, and returns to Earth. The story concludes with Revenge's closing track, "I Never Told You What I Do for a Living", where the male lover realizes the final person he must kill is himself, ending in his suicide. Boisvert cited the line "1,000 bodies piled up" in "Drowning Lessons" as a reference to the thousand souls the protagonist of Revenge must collect. He considered this evidence of "Drowning Lessons", "Demolition Lovers", and Revenge being part of the same narrative.

== Critical reception ==
Multiple music critics praised the song's composition. Lord said that it combined two different sounds—specifically the quiet moments and the high energy parts—throughout its runtime to create an example on "proper intensity-building". He said that, while listeners could feel lost when listening to the two parts separately, the full song "makes sense". DaveyBoy, a staff writer of Sputnikmusic, called it an "emotional rollercoaster" that made good use of its six-minute run time with "effective changes of pace and structure". Mala Mortensa of Alternative Press said it was a "fireworks display" of multiple "successful elements" present throughout the rest of Bullets. Wang said that the song differed from the rest of Bullets as a somber love song where "screamo, shredding guitars, and driving percussion" contrasted with its "haunting melodies".

Em Moore of Exclaim! praised the song's lyrics, calling them "wonderfully crafted" with imagery to transport listeners into another world. He also likened the story as more akin to a film rather than a song. Wang said that the song had some of the most "edgy" lyrics that the band had ever written. Cassie Whitt of Loudwire called it a "romantic and frantic love song". Schade described it as a "melancholic track" with all elements of a good My Chemical Romance song, including a great storyline. She also praised Gerard Way's vocal performance as "brooding and forceful, holding pain in every note". Enis said that the song was representative of the storytelling that the band would focus on with their future works, though called it a "disorienting first stab".

In their initial reviews of Bullets, Lord and DaveyBoy both considered "Demolition Lovers" to be one of its best songs. Tenreyro wrote that the song, alongside "Vampires Will Never Hurt You" and "Honey, This Mirror Isn't Big Enough for the Two of Us", represented a trilogy of Bullets songs that put My Chemical Romance "on the map". Retrospective opinions on "Demolition Lovers" have generally considered it one of the band's better songs, and the song has also been noted as a fan-favorite. Moore ranked it as their second best song, Marianne Eloise of Louder ranked it 15th, Chloe Spinks of Gigwise ranked it 24th, and Loudwire ranked it 27th. A readers' poll for Alternative Press ranked it as the band's 4th best song.

== Credits and personnel ==
Credits are taken from the I Brought You My Bullets, You Brought Me Your Love CD booklet.

=== My Chemical Romance ===
- Gerard Way – vocals
- Ray Toro – guitars
- Mikey Way – bass guitar
- Matt Pelissier – drums

=== Technical personnel ===
- Geoff Rickly – producer
- John Naclerio – recording, mixing
- Ryan Ball – mastering
