= Skylines and Turnstiles =

2002 song by My Chemical Romance

Song by My Chemical Romance

from the album I Brought You My Bullets, You Brought Me Your Love
- Released: July 23, 2002
- Recorded: May 2002
- Studio: Nada Studios, New Windsor
- Genre: Hardcore punk; pop-punk
- Length: 3:23
- Label: Eyeball
- Songwriters: Matt Pelissier; Ray Toro; Gerard Way; Mikey Way
- Producer: Geoff Rickly

"Skylines and Turnstiles" is a song by the American rock band My Chemical Romance, released as the seventh track from their debut studio album, I Brought You My Bullets, You Brought Me Your Love (2002). A hardcore punk and pop-punk song whose lyrics focus on the September 11 attacks, Gerard Way initially wrote "Skylines and Turnstiles", his first song, after witnessing the attacks; subsequently, the song continued to be fleshed out as Way formed My Chemical Romance. The song was written by band members Matt Pelissier, Ray Toro, Gerard Way, and Mikey Way, and was produced by Geoff Rickly.

"Skylines and Turnstiles" received mixed retrospective reviews from music critics, with the track being deemed both as a standout and as an unpolished inclusion on the album. Nonetheless, critics have also identified it as one of the best songs in My Chemical Romance's discography, highlighting its role in establishing the band and its sound. "Skylines and Turnstiles" was the first song that the band performed during their debut live show, and was later performed as part of their reunion tour. A demo of "Skylines and Turnstiles" was also released on the band's greatest hits album, May Death Never Stop You (2014).

== Background, writing, and composition ==
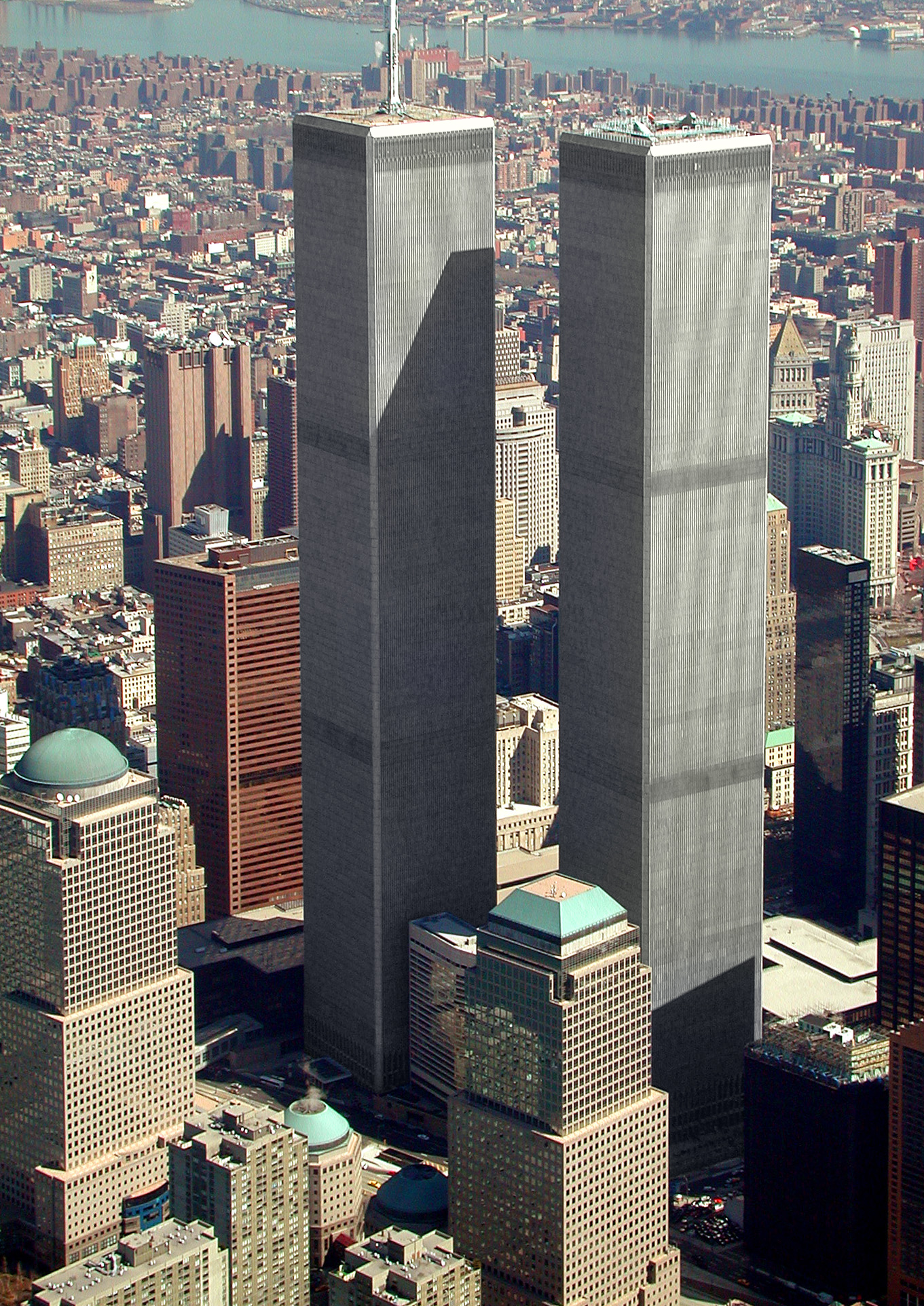
"Skylines and Turnstiles", written after Gerard Way witnessed the September 11 attacks, includes lyrical references to the fall of the Twin Towers (pictured in March 2001).

Prior to the formation of My Chemical Romance, Gerard Way worked in the art industry. (Note: Sources disagree on where Way worked at the time. My Chemical Romance biographer Tom Bryant wrote that he worked as an action figure designer at Fun House, a company in Hoboken, New Jersey, while Tom Shepherd of Kerrang! wrote that he worked as an intern at Cartoon Network in New York.) However, upon witnessing the September 11 attacks, Way decided to give up art and start a band in order to "see the world" and "make a difference". The same day, he penned "Skylines and Turnstiles", his first song, in his parents' basement with a guitar and practice amp in reaction to the attacks. He then recruited Matt Pelissier, who played in a local rock band, to bring percussion onto the track. Later, Way and Pelissier played "Skylines and Turnstiles" to Ray Toro — who was in the same band with Pelissier — whereupon according to Way he "improved it tenfold instantly". The group subsequently recorded The Attic Demo in Pelissier's attic, a set of three demos including that of "Skylines and Turnstiles". My Chemical Romance would later record the song, as well as the majority of their debut studio album I Brought You My Bullets, You Brought Me Your Love, in May 2002 at Nada Studios in New Windsor, New York with Thursday frontman Geoff Rickly as producer.

With a length of three minutes and twenty-three seconds, "Skylines and Turnstiles" is a hardcore punk and pop-punk song, with an element of horror punk. The song contains "scabrous and shimmering" guitar and "throat-shredding screams", which would go on to be staples of My Chemical Romance's music. Lyrically, "Skylines and Turnstiles" focuses on the fear, uncertainty, and hope Way felt as a result of the September 11 attacks. The lyrics include references to the fall of the Twin Towers and the "futility" of daily life.

== Release and live performances ==
"Skylines and Turnstiles" made its live debut in October 2001, being the first song performed during the band's debut show. The song was later released on July 23, 2002, as the seventh track on I Brought You My Bullets, You Brought Me Your Love. The demo of "Skylines and Turnstiles" was later included on May Death Never Stop You, the band's 2014 greatest hits album, alongside the other "attic demos". My Chemical Romance rarely perform "Skylines and Turnstiles" live; however, the band performed the song as part of early shows following the release of the album. "Skylines and Turnstiles" was also played during the 10th Annual Honda Civic Tour (2011), where it was played live for the first time in 7 years in Detroit. They also played it as part of their reunion tour, notably as the second song of their performance on September 11, 2022 at Barclays Center in New York City, and the opening track for the B-stage set-list as part of the Long Live The Black Parade tour's show at Metlife Stadium in East Rutherford, New Jersey.

== Critical reception ==
The song received mixed retrospective reviews from music critics; Austin Saalman of Under the Radar praised it as a standout track, while a 2008 review for Sputnikmusic instead described it as being unpolished and "of poor quality in almost every department". Dillon Eastoe of Gigwise included "Skylines and Turnstiles" in his list of the band's underrated songs, praising Way's "raw" vocals and its "harrowing" lyrics as being evocative of the September 11 attacks. Paste's Tatiana Tenreyro similarly praised the rawness of the song's lyrics, yet conceded that it was not "one of the best tracks sonically". Writing for The Ringer, Rob Harvilla also emphasized that the track was not the best on I Brought You My Bullets, yet as a first song written it "got [Gerard Way] where he needed to go, which was firmly on the road to leading everyone where they needed to go".

Music critics have placed "Skylines and Turnstiles" among the best songs in My Chemical Romance's discography as a whole, due to its role in establishing the band and its sound. The staffs of Spin and Billboard included the song in their lists of the 10 and 15 best My Chemical Romance songs respectively, with Taylor Weatherby of the latter praising its emotional resonance and writing that the song would "largely inform the group’s music for the rest of their career". Cassie Whitt and Jake Richardson of Loudwire similarly declared "Skylines and Turnstiles" the fifth-best song by the band, with the former writing that it was "perhaps the most important song" in their catalog due to being their first written. Em Moore of Exclaim! also ranked it as the band's fifth best song, describing it as a "great introduction to the band" for its sound and "visual and visceral" lyrics. Law ranked the track at number 19 in his list of the band's 20 greatest songs, writing that it was a "jagged work in progress, but glowed with undeniable burning promise".

== Credits and personnel ==
Credits are taken from I Brought You My Bullets, You Brought Me Your Love CD booklet.

My Chemical Romance

- Gerard Way – vocals
- Ray Toro – guitars
- Mikey Way – bass guitar
- Matt Pelissier – drums

Technical personnel

- Geoff Rickly – producer
- John Naclerio – recording, mixing
- Ryan Ball – mastering
