= May Death Never Stop You =

2014 greatest hits album by My Chemical Romance

Greatest hits album by My Chemical Romance
- Released: March 25, 2014
- Length: 73:20
- Label: Reprise
- Producers: Rob Cavallo; Doug McKean; My Chemical Romance; Geoff Rickly; Alex Saavedra; Howard Benson

My Chemical Romance chronology
Conventional Weapons (2012-2013)	May Death Never Stop You (2014)	The Black Parade/Living with Ghosts (2016)

Singles from May Death Never Stop You
- 1. "Fake Your Death" Released: February 17, 2014

May Death Never Stop You (Note: Also known as May Death Never Stop You: The Greatest Hits (2001-2013).) is a greatest hits compilation album by the American rock band My Chemical Romance. It was released on March 25, 2014, through Reprise Records and is a collection of 19 songs from across My Chemical Romance's discography from 2001 to 2013. Most of those songs are from previous albums, ranging from their commercially successful singles to fan-favorite songs. In addition to those songs, the album contains a previously unreleased song, "Fake Your Death", and three demos.

The album was announced after My Chemical Romance announced their breakup in 2013. The album was supported by "Fake Your Death", which was released as a single on February 17 and was the final song that the band had made before their breakup. The album received generally positive reviews from critics, who viewed the release as a good overview of the band's history, though some had mixed opinions on its track selection. It charted in several countries and was later certified platinum by the British Phonographic Industry and gold by Recorded Music NZ.

== Background and release ==
On March 22, 2013, My Chemical Romance announced that they would be breaking up through a blog post on their official website. (Note: My Chemical Romance later reunited in 2019, and has since released new music.) Two days later, band member Gerard Way confirmed the break up through a post on his Twitter account. Later that year on December 13, the band announced that they would be releasing a greatest hits album, titled May Death Never Stop You, in celebration of the band's history. In addition to containing songs from each of the band's studio albums, the band announced that the album would contain previously unreleased material. The album's cover art was designed by Way, who previously revealed it on November 30. It features a ruined, half-destroyed statue in the center in a marching uniform from The Black Parade (2006), as well as memorabilia representing the band's other albums scattered throughout. In January 2014, it was announced that the album would contain "Fake Your Death", the final finished song that the band had created. It was originally intended for the band's scrapped fifth album, The Paper Kingdom.

Pre-orders for the album started on January 21, 2014. On February 17, "Fake Your Death" was released as a single on iTunes and BBC Radio 1. A trailer for the album was released that same day, containing clips of the band's music videos accompanied by the song. May Death Never Stop You was released on March 25, 2014 through Reprise Records. The album was available in three editions: a standard version released on CD, a Deluxe edition containing a DVD with extra content, and a "Physical Deluxe" edition that included the CD as well as a two-piece vinyl set.

== Music ==
May Death Never Stop You is a greatest hits compilation album containing 19 songs from across My Chemical Romance's discography from 2001 to 2013. Most of these are from their previous studio albums, with two songs from I Brought You My Bullets, You Brought Me Your Love (2002), four each from Three Cheers for Sweet Revenge (2004) and Danger Days: The True Lives of the Fabulous Killjoys (2010), and five from The Black Parade (2006).

While the majority of songs featured on the album were successful singles, some were never released as such, instead being fan-favorites. These include "You Know What They Do to Guys Like Us in Prison", "Cancer", and "Mama". Similarly, two of the band's singles, "Thank You for the Venom" and "I Don't Love You" were excluded, despite the latter's commercial success in the United Kingdom. Alongside their songs from previous albums, May Death Never Stop You features the aforementioned "Fake Your Death" and three songs from their "Attic Demo" sessions: "Cubicles", "Skylines and Turnstiles", and "Knives/Sorrow", the third of which is a demo of "Our Lady of Sorrows". The album's deluxe edition comes with a DVD that features twelve of the band's music videos. Among these is the previously unreleased video for "Blood" and the scrapped introduction to the clip for "Na Na Na (Na Na Na Na Na Na Na Na Na)".

"Fake Your Death" is a piano ballad. Alongside the band's regular members, the song features James Dewees on keyboard. It is the album's opening track. Evan Sawdey of PopMatters described the song as "bombastic", and felt that it was comparable to a song from The Black Parade. It was previously recorded for their scrapped fifth studio album, and ended up being the last song the band had completed before breaking up. According to Frank Iero, the song was the only recording from the project that was suitable for release, saying that the other tracks from it were unsalvageable and unlikely to ever be released officially. Gerard Way stated that he viewed the song as a "eulogy for the band", as well as its "final fully realized collaboration", though he did not initially create the song with the idea that it would be the band's last.

== Reception ==
Professional ratings
Aggregate scores
Source	Rating
Metacritic	79/100
Review scores
Source	Rating
AllMusic	4/5 stars
Alternative Addiction	3.5/5 stars
Drowned in Sound	7/10
PopMatters	7/10

May Death Never Stop You received generally positive reviews from critics. On review aggregator Metacritic, it holds a score of 79 based on 4 critic reviews.

Evan Sawdey of PopMatters described May Death Never Stop You as a "fitting monument" to My Chemical Romance's legacy and discography. Similar thoughts were written by Carla Washbourne of Drowned in Sound. Sawdey felt that, in most cases, creating a compilation of the band's work would have been difficult, and highlighted band's decision to use fan-favorite songs over what he considered to be "less interesting" radio singles as helping combat this. Similar thoughts were echoed by Washbourne and AllMusic's Stephen Erlewine. Erlewine further described the compilation as highlighting how most of the band's best songs were able to stand on their own, even when taken out of their associated albums.

Sawdey criticized the demos included in the album, describing them as "weak and disposable". He also criticized the lack of some fan-favorite songs, such as B-sides or songs from Conventional Weapons, feeling that those should have been included over the demos. Alternative Addiction felt that the songs included on the album were not the best choices, criticizing the lack of material from Conventional Weapons and the exclusions of "Thank You for the Venom" and "Dead!"; while he believed that these omissions were flaws, he felt that they did not significantly impact the release. Washbourne liked the inclusion of the demos and felt that while the album slightly prioritized the band's more popular material, the track list effectively functioned as an "evolutionary tree" of My Chemical Romance's discography, with the addition of "Fake Your Death" converting it into a "smartly chronological last hurrah".

== Commercial performance ==
In the United States, May Death Never Stop You debuted and peaked at number 9 on the Billboard 200, spending 6 weeks on that chart. In the United Kingdom, it reached number 15 on the UK Albums chart, and was later certified platinum by the British Phonographic Industry. In New Zealand, it peaked at number 22 on the New Zealand Albums chart and has been certified gold by Recorded Music NZ. Elsewhere, it charted on the album charts for Hungary (number 2), Australia (number 11), Ireland (number 13), Scotland (number 17), and Czechia (number 25).

== Track listing ==
Standard tracklist
No.	Title	Writer(s)	Originally from	Length
1.	"Fake Your Death"	James Dewees, Frank Iero, Ray Toro, Gerard Way, Mikey Way	Previously unreleased	3:21
2.	"Honey, This Mirror Isn't Big Enough for the Two of Us"	Iero, Matt Pelissier, Toro, G. Way, M. Way	I Brought You My Bullets, You Brought Me Your Love	3:53
3.	"Vampires Will Never Hurt You"	Iero, Pelissier, Toro, G. Way, M. Way	I Brought You My Bullets, You Brought Me Your Love	5:26
4.	"Helena"	Iero, Pelissier, Toro, G. Way, M. Way	Three Cheers for Sweet Revenge	3:26
5.	"You Know What They Do to Guys Like Us in Prison"	Iero, Pelissier, Toro, G. Way, M. Way	Three Cheers for Sweet Revenge	2:55
6.	"I'm Not Okay (I Promise)"	Iero, Pelissier, Toro, G. Way, M. Way	Three Cheers for Sweet Revenge	3:08
7.	"The Ghost of You"	Iero, Pelissier, Toro, G. Way, M. Way	Three Cheers for Sweet Revenge	3:57
8.	"Welcome to the Black Parade"	Bob Bryar, Iero, Toro, G. Way, M. Way	The Black Parade	5:14
9.	"Cancer"	Bryar, Iero, Toro, G. Way, M. Way	The Black Parade	2:25
10.	"Mama"	Bryar, Iero, Toro, G. Way, M. Way	The Black Parade	4:39
11.	"Teenagers"	Bryar, Iero, Toro, G. Way, M. Way	The Black Parade	2:42
12.	"Famous Last Words"	Bryar, Iero, Toro, G. Way, M. Way	The Black Parade	5:00
13.	"Na Na Na (Na Na Na Na Na Na Na Na Na)"	Bryar, Iero, Toro, G. Way, M. Way	Danger Days: The True Lives of the Fabulous Killjoys	3:26
14.	"Sing"	Iero, Toro, G. Way, M. Way	Danger Days: The True Lives of the Fabulous Killjoys	4:31
15.	"Planetary (Go!)"	Iero, Toro, G. Way, M. Way	Danger Days: The True Lives of the Fabulous Killjoys	4:07
16.	"The Kids from Yesterday"	Iero, Toro, G. Way, M. Way	Danger Days: The True Lives of the Fabulous Killjoys	5:26
17.	"Skylines and Turnstiles" (demo version)	Pelissier, Toro, G. Way, M. Way	Previously unreleased	3:30
18.	"Knives/Sorrow" (demo version)	Pelissier, Toro, G. Way, M. Way	Previously unreleased	2:14
19.	"Cubicles" (demo version)	Pelissier, Toro, G. Way, M. Way	Previously unreleased	4:00
Total length:				73:20

Bonus "Video Outtakes" DVD
No.	Title	Length
1.	"I'm Not Okay (I Promise)" (version 1)	1:48
2.	"I'm Not Okay (I Promise)" (version 2)	7:43
3.	"Helena"	23:06
4.	"The Ghost of You"	4:26
5.	"Welcome to the Black Parade"	24:20
6.	"Famous Last Words"	11:30
7.	"I Don't Love You"	14:54
8.	"Teenagers"	6:07
9.	"Blood" (previously unreleased)	1:30
10.	"Na Na Na (Na Na Na Na Na Na Na Na Na)" / "Art Is the Weapon"	9:34
11.	"Sing"	4:37
12.	"Planetary (Go!)"	16:55

== Personnel ==
Credits adapted from iTunes.

My Chemical Romance

- Bob Bryar – drums, percussion (on tracks 8–12); production (8–12)
- James Dewees – keyboards (on track 1); production (1)
- Frank Iero – guitars, backing vocals (on tracks 1–2, 4–16); production (1, 8–16)
- Matt Pelissier – drums, percussion (on tracks 2–7, 17–19)
- Ray Toro – guitars, backing vocals; bass guitar (on track 9); production (1, 8–16)
- Gerard Way – lead vocals; production (1, 8–16)
- Mikey Way – bass guitar (except track 9); production (1, 8–16)

Additional musicians

- Jarrod Alexander – drums, percussion (on track 1)
- John Miceli – drums, percussion (on tracks 13–16)
- Rob Cavallo – acoustic piano (on tracks 8–12)
- Howard Benson – organ (on tracks 4–7)
- Jamie Muhoberac – keyboards (on tracks 8–16); organ, synthesizers, Wurlitzer (on tracks 8–12)
- Cheech Iero – additional percussion (on track 8)
- Bert McCracken – additional vocals (on track 5)
- Liza Minnelli – additional vocals (on track 10)

Production

- Rob Cavallo – production (on tracks 1, 8–16)
- Doug McKean – production (on track 1)
- Geoff Rickly – production (on tracks 2, 3)
- Alex Saavedra – production (on track 3)
- Howard Benson – production (on tracks 4–7)
- Ted Jensen – mastering

== Charts ==
2014 chart performance
Chart (2014)	Peak position
Australian Albums (ARIA)	11
Belgian Albums (Ultratop Flanders)	147
Czech Albums (ČNS IFPI)	25
German Albums (Offizielle Top 100)	66
Hungarian Albums (MAHASZ)	2
Irish Albums (IRMA)	13
Italian Albums (FIMI)	67
Japanese Albums (Oricon)	37
Mexican Albums (Top 100 Mexico)	16
New Zealand Albums (RMNZ)	22
Polish Albums (ZPAV)	37
Scottish Albums (Official Charts)	17
South Korean Albums (Gaon)	29
Spanish Albums (Promusicae)	61
UK Albums (Official Charts)	15
UK Rock & Metal Albums (Official Charts)	1
US Billboard 200	9
US Indie Store Album Sales (Billboard)	16
US Top Alternative Albums (Billboard)	2
US Top Rock Albums (Billboard)	2

2025 chart performance
Chart (2025)	Peak position
Croatian International Albums (HDU)	19

== Certifications ==
Certifications and sales
Region	Certification	Certified units/sales
New Zealand (RMNZ)	Gold	7,500^{‡}
United Kingdom (BPI)	Platinum	300,000^{‡}
^{‡} Sales+streaming figures based on certification alone.
