= Honey, This Mirror Isn't Big Enough for the Two of Us =

2003 single by My Chemical Romance

Single by My Chemical Romance

from the album I Brought You My Bullets, You Brought Me Your Love
- B-side: "This Is the Best Day Ever"
- Released: December 15, 2003
- Recorded: May 2002
- Studio: Nada Studios, New Windsor
- Genre: Emo
- Length: 3:53
- Label: Eyeball
- Songwriters: Frank Iero; Matt Pelissier; Ray Toro; Gerard Way; Mikey Way
- Producer: Geoff Rickly

My Chemical Romance singles chronology
| "Honey, This Mirror Isn't Big Enough for the Two of Us" (2003) | "Headfirst for Halos" (2004) |

"Honey, This Mirror Isn't Big Enough for the Two of Us" is a song by the American rock band My Chemical Romance from their debut studio album, I Brought You My Bullets, You Brought Me Your Love (2002). An emo song, its lyrics reference Gerard Way simultaneously taking antidepressants and alcohol, his body image, and a break-up. "Honey, This Mirror Isn't Big Enough for the Two of Us" was written by band members Frank Iero, Matt Pelissier, Ray Toro, Gerard Way, and Mikey Way, and was produced by Geoff Rickly.

The second song on the album, it was recorded in May 2002 at Nada Studios and was released as the band's debut single in the United Kingdom on December 15, 2003. A music video for the track, inspired by and based on the horror film Audition, was produced in 2002, and received a wider release in 2005. "Honey, This Mirror Isn't Big Enough for the Two of Us" received generally positive reviews from music critics, who praised its lyrical rawness and the early hints of the band's future sound. The track reached number 26 on the UK Rock & Metal Singles Chart and number 182 on the UK singles chart.

== Background and release ==
My Chemical Romance formed after Gerard Way witnessed the September 11 attacks and decided to start a band in an attempt to "take stock of his own life". In May 2002, the band set out to record the majority of their first studio album, I Brought You My Bullets, You Brought Me Your Love, at Nada Studios in New Windsor, New York. There, "Honey, This Mirror Isn't Big Enough for the Two of Us" was one of the first songs that Frank Iero took part in the songwriting of, having joined the band after the majority of the album's contents had been written; Ray Toro recalled the song's recording as being one of the first times the two musicians "really clicked", due to their different guitar-playing styles. According to Gerard Way in an interview with WSOU 89.5, a New Jersey radio station, he stated "Honey, This Mirror Isn't Big Enough for the Two of Us" was inspired by bassist Mikey Way and his ex–girlfriend at the time. He also confirmed that it was the last song the band wrote before recording the album.

The song was first released on July 23, 2002, as the second song on I Brought You My Bullets, You Brought Me Your Love, placed between "Romance" and "Vampires Will Never Hurt You". The track was later released on December 15, 2003, as a single in the United Kingdom, with a CD and a 7" vinyl being released by Twenty-20 Records. Both of the physical releases included "This Is the Best Day Ever" as a B-side. The song was also included on May Death Never Stop You, the band's 2014 greatest hits album. My Chemical Romance has performed "Honey, This Mirror Isn't Big Enough for the Two of Us" live on various occasions, including as part of their early shows directly after the album's release, the World Contamination Tour (2010-2012), and the Long Live The Black Parade tour (2025-2026). Gerard Way would introduce the song in live performances by claiming it was about "sucking dick for cocaine".

=== Music video ===
An accompanying music video for "Honey, This Mirror Isn't Big Enough for the Two of Us" was produced, originally being shown in 2002 during an album release party and being more widely released in 2005. The video follows the story of the 1999 horror film Audition, where a man is tortured and has his foot cut off by a woman he previously interviewed when looking for a wife. Retrospective rankings of the band's music videos have placed the one for "Honey, This Mirror Isn't Big Enough for the Two of Us" as being one of the band's worst, with Alternative Press calling it "weird" and Aliya Chaudhry of Kerrang! noting that it was "merely a glimpse at what they were capable of".

== Composition and lyrics ==
"Honey, This Mirror Isn't Big Enough for the Two of Us"
A 16-second sample from the pre-chorus of "Honey, This Mirror Isn't Big Enough for the Two of Us". An emo song, it employs a "loud-quiet-loud" dynamic.

"Honey, This Mirror Isn't Big Enough for the Two of Us" is an emo song which the author Dan Ozzi described as "shifting abruptly between styles like a car with a broken transmission". The song begins with a guitar riff which has been described as being metalcore, before a second rhythm guitar enters rendering the song "downright sinister". The song is then followed by melodic verses "randomly peppered with abrasive screaming" before an "anthemic" chorus enters. The song contains a "loud-quiet-loud" song structure, with its bridge providing a "brief moment of soft respite" before an "explosive payoff" occurs. Gerard Way's vocals employ a shift between quiet "wails" and loud "screams", and the song has a "combination of heavy instrumentals" throughout.

Lyrically, "Honey, This Mirror Isn't Big Enough for the Two of Us" is about Gerard Way simultaneously consuming antidepressants and alcohol, with the song's first line being "The amount of pills I'm taking counteracts the booze I'm drinking". According to My Chemical Romance biographer Tom Bryant, the song also explores Way's body image through "rich imagery". Desiree Bowie, writing for the Recording Academy, noted that the song's lyrics additionally concern a breakup.

== Critical reception ==
"Honey, This Mirror Isn't Big Enough for the Two of Us" received generally positive reviews from retrospective music critics, with Alternative Press writing that it "offered early inklings of what MCR would later become". A review of the album on Sputnikmusic described the song as "solid", while Austin Saalman of Under the Radar considered it one of the band's "finest songs" and a staple in emo culture. Jesse Lord of IGN similarly praised the song for being a "solid tune that any emo/screamo fan will be able to relate to", yet criticized the song for being "straightforward". Chris Payne of Stereogum particularly praised Ray Toro's guitar performance on the track, calling it "certifiably filthy".

The song has placed well in rankings of the band's discography, with James Veck-Gilodi of the band Deaf Havana calling it his favorite track by My Chemical Romance due to its lyrical rawness. Chad Childers of Loudwire and Margaret Farrell of Stereogum ranked the track as the band's ninth- and tenth-best song in their respective lists of the band's best 10 song, with the latter praising its wordplay and noting that the song "foreshadows [the band's] brilliant signatures". Chloe Spinks of Gigwise placed the song at number 18 (of 79) in her ranking of the band's discography as a whole, at the highest position for a track from I Brought You My Bullets, You Brought Me Your Love, citing its vulnerability and comparing it to a "time capsule from before the introduction of fancy production and targeted branding". A similar ranking by Cassie Whitt and Jake Richardson, also for Loudwire, placed the song at number 35 (of 71), with the latter writing that it "possessed both the snarl and charm that would define [the band's] later work".

== Credits and personnel ==
Credits are adapted from Apple Music.

My Chemical Romance
- Gerard Way – songwriter, lead vocals
- Raymond Toro – songwriter, background vocals, guitar
- Frank Iero – songwriter, background vocals
- Mikey Way – songwriter, bass guitar
- Matt Pelissier – songwriter, drums, percussion
Additional personnel
- Geoff Rickly – producer
- John Naclerio – mixing engineer, recording engineer
- Ryan Ball – mastering engineer

== Charts ==
| Chart (2003) | Peak position |
|---|---|
| UK Singles (OCC) | 182 |
| UK Rock & Metal (Official Charts) | 26 |
