= Helena (song) =

2005 single by My Chemical Romance

Single by My Chemical Romance

from the album Three Cheers for Sweet Revenge
- Released: March 8, 2005
- Recorded: 2004
- Genre: Emo
- Length: 3:22
- Label: Reprise
- Songwriters: Frank Iero; Matt Pelissier; Ray Toro; Gerard Way; Mikey Way
- Producer: Howard Benson

My Chemical Romance singles chronology
"I'm Not Okay (I Promise)" (2004)	"Helena" (2005)	"Under Pressure" (2005)

Music video
- "Helena" on YouTube "Helena (Outtake Version)" on YouTube

"Helena" (alternatively titled "Helena (So Long & Goodnight)") is a song by the American rock band My Chemical Romance from their second studio album, Three Cheers for Sweet Revenge (2004). It was released as the album's second single on March 8, 2005. An emo song, it was created in memory of band members Gerard Way and Mikey Way's late grandmother, who died while the band was touring and unable to visit her during the last year of her life. Although it was one of the last tracks on the album to be written, the direction that Gerard Way took it in influenced the rest of Three Cheers for Sweet Revenge's tracks. A music video, directed by Marc Webb and filmed at a church in Los Angeles, was also released.

The song and its music video were well received by critics. It was a commercial success, charting in several countries and becoming the band's first major hit on the Billboard Hot 100, as well as reaching number one on the UK Rock & Metal chart. It has been certified 4x Platinum by the Recording Industry Association of America, 2x Platinum by Music Canada, and Platinum by both the British Phonographic Industry and Recorded Music NZ. The song was nominated for five awards at the 2005 MTV Video Music Awards, although it did not win in any of the categories.

"Helena" is often considered by journalists to be the band's breakout hit, a contributor to the commercial success of Three Cheers for Sweet Revenge, and an influential track on the emo music genre. Some have considered it as one of My Chemical Romance's best songs, as well as one of the best emo and goth songs in history. It is among the band's most played songs at live concerts, typically being used as a closing track.

== Background and release ==
While touring in 2003 for their first studio album, My Chemical Romance began writing material for their second studio album, Three Cheers for Sweet Revenge (2004). By the time the band had concluded the tour in November, a large part of the album was already written, and they had also signed a record deal with Reprise Records to publish it. The same day that the band had finished touring, the grandmother of band members Gerard and Mikey Way, whose name was Elena, died. The brothers were heavily impacted by her death, with Gerard being upset over how he was unable to see her one final time. Determined to honor her legacy, Gerard began writing "Helena".

While "Helena" was one of the latter tracks from Three Cheers for Sweet Revenge to be created, the direction that Gerard took the song in influenced how the rest of the album would be produced. He said that "the emotions I went through [when she died] and over the next six days were what completely fuelled Revenge", and that every emotion that someone could cope with loss with was present on the album. The band began recording the album in 2004 after concluding a short, already scheduled tour in the United Kingdom. The album, including "Helena", was produced by Howard Benson.

Three Cheers for Sweet Revenge was released on June 8, 2004, through Reprise; "Helena" is the album's opening track. On streaming services such as iTunes, its full title is "Helena (So Long & Goodnight)". It was released onto radio as the album's second single on March 8, 2005, also through Reprise. A live recording of the track, performed at the Starland Ballroom in Sayreville, New Jersey was released on iTunes on May 23. "Helena" was later included on the band's greatest hits album, May Death Never Stop You, released on March 25, 2014. Additionally, a remastered version of the track, produced by Rich Costey, appeared on a deluxe edition of Three Cheers for Sweet Revenge, alongside a 2005 live recording from BBC Radio 1's The Lock Up.

== Composition and lyrics ==
"Helena"
An excerpt of the introduction of "Helena", demonstrating Gerard Way's whispering and the beginning of the main song, which Arielle Gordon compared to a jump scare.

"Helena" has been described as an emo song. It is 3 minutes and 22 seconds long. It begins with an introduction of a muffled, reverberating guitar with Gerard Way whispering the track's opening lines. 16 seconds later, the song fully begins with what Billboard described as a "captivating raucous" of guitars and drums. Pitchfork compared that moment in the song to a jumpscare. The song is generally fairly fast-paced, being sung at "manic speed", though each chorus slows the track down temporarily. Pitchfork described it as going "from funereal poise to unbound abandon".

While Three Cheers for Sweet Revenge itself follows a specific narrative, "Helena" is completely separated from the story. As aforementioned, the song's lyrics are about Gerard Way and Mikey Way's deceased grandmother, with a large amount of Gerard's self-hatred being incorporated into the track. He stated that he wrote the track with a lot of self-hatred towards himself, for not being there during the last year of his grandmother's life. The song demonstrates this meaning with dark, "edgy" lyrics such as "just like the hearse you die to get in again". Sam Law of Kerrang! believed that the track, alongside its original meaning as a personal song, also could fit as a continuation of a previous song by the band, "Demolition Lovers". Similarly, Variety's Katie Reul wrote that "Helena" could also be interpreted as a mournful breakup song.

== Commercial performance ==
"Helena" is considered My Chemical Romance's first commercial success, being the band's first high-charting single on the US Billboard Hot 100 with a number-33 peak position. The song also debuted and peaked at number 19 on the Hot Rock & Alternative Songs chart in 2019, as a result of the band's reunion being announced. It was certified 4× platinum by the Recording Industry Association of America. The song also made the top-40 of sales charts for the UK, where it was certified platinum by the British Phonographic Industry, and New Zealand, where it was certified platinum by Recorded Music NZ. it was also certified 2x Platinum by Music Canada.

== Critical reception ==
Upon its release, several reviewers highlighted "Helena" as a standout track on Three Cheers for Sweet Revenge. A staff editor of IGN described "Helena" as a song that "covers every base", featuring every element that one would typically expect out of an emo song. Emily Zemler of Alternative Press stated that Gerard Way's performance on the song was "breathlessly compelling", and Ian Mathers of Stylus highlighted the song's usage as an opening track. Upon the song's release as a single, Billboard staff described the track as one that "bursts with energy" and considered it more catchy than the album's lead single, "I'm Not Okay (I Promise)". In retrospective rankings, "Helena" is often regarded as one of the best songs from My Chemical Romance's discography. Louder's Marianne Eloise and Stereogum's Margaret Farrell both ranked it as the second best in the band's discography, while Loudwire ranked it third and both Exclaim! and Kerrang! ranked it fourth. "Helena" has also been considered one of the best emo songs of all time by Variety and Vulture, as well as one of the best goth songs by Rolling Stone and NME.

== Legacy ==
"Helena"'s commercial success is often credited by journalists as helping popularize and commercialize emo music in the 2000s, with the song and its associated music video being cultural touchstones for emo and pop-punk. It has also been considered My Chemical Romance's breakout hit. With the popularity of "Helena" and its music video, My Chemical Romance became one of the most popular emo bands of the 2000s. It also contributed to the commercial success of its parent album, Three Cheers for Sweet Revenge, which went on to sell three million units. It remains My Chemical Romance's second most successful song in the United States, behind "Welcome to the Black Parade". Bryan Reesman of American Songwriter described "Helena" as a song that not only stood out among the rest of My Chemical Romance's discography, but early 2000s rock music as a whole.

== Music video ==
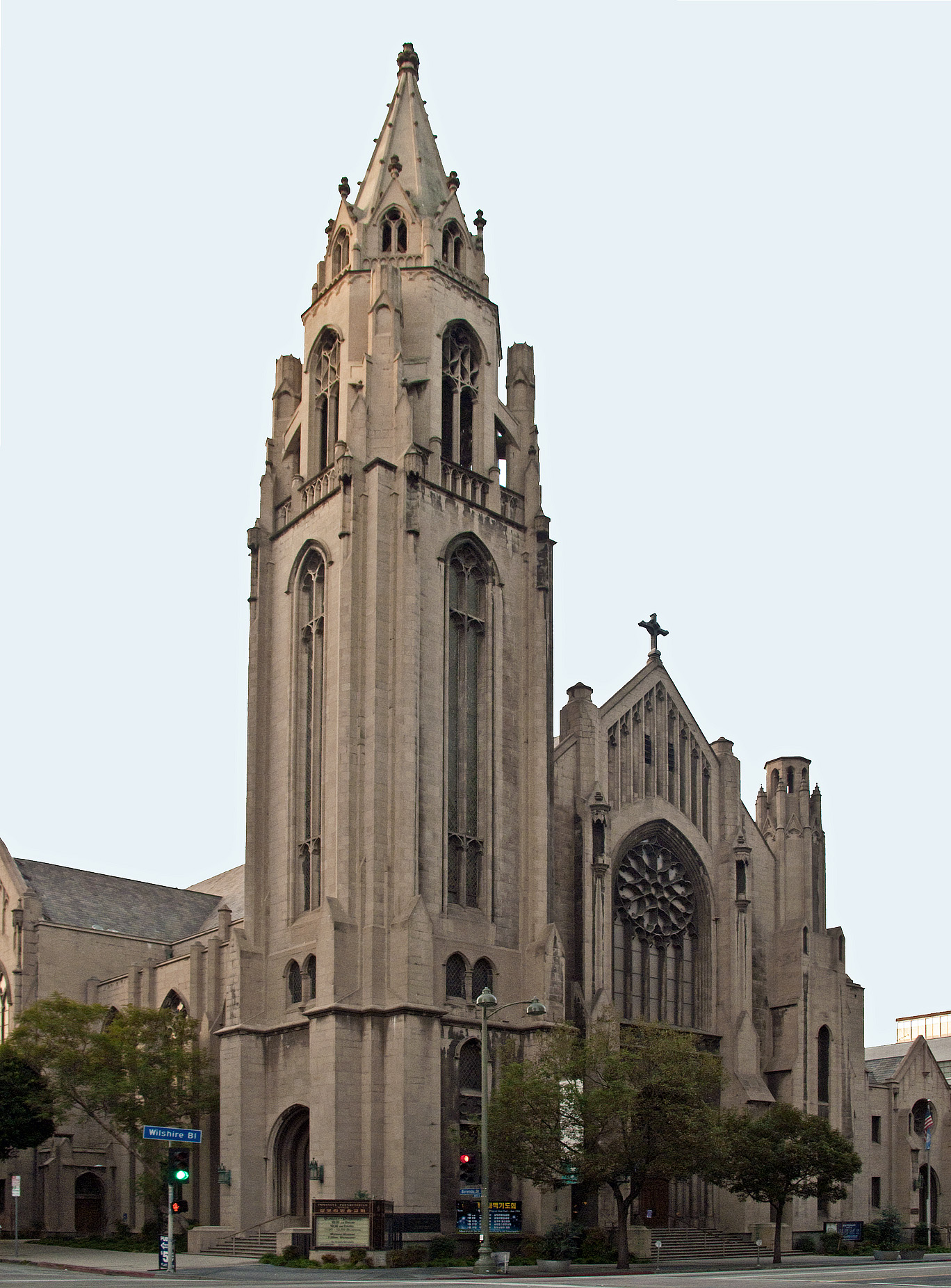
The music video for "Helena" was filmed at the Immanuel Presbyterian Church (pictured in 2013) in Los Angeles.

The song's music video was directed by Marc Webb. It was filmed from January 7–8, 2005 at the Immanuel Presbyterian Church in Los Angeles. During filming, fans of the band were invited to appear in the video as mourners at a funeral. While the original focus of the song was a real-world death, the music video shifts over its context to tell the story of a young woman (played by Tracy Phillips) who died, with Gerard Way standing in the pulpit. Throughout the music video, it cuts between shots of the band performing in the church and the funeral attendees participating in a dance number.

After a while, the woman rises from her coffin and begins to dance through the church aisle, interacting with the attendees and at one point grabbing the camera to join her. Eventually, she collapses back into her casket, and is carried out of the church in the rain by six pallbearers: the band's five members, plus one fan. As the woman is carried out, the funeral attendees dance around the casket with black and red umbrellas. This scene was not created with the rain in mind, though the crew felt that it made the video look better. The dances in the video were choreographed by Michael Rooney.

The music video was among the 100 most requested videos on MTV2 for several weeks in 2005, reached number one over a dozen times on Total Request Live, and was frequently played on Fuse. It was nominated for five awards at the 2005 MTV Video Music Awards: Best Rock Video, Best New Artist in a Video, Best Choreography, MTV2 Award, and Viewer's Choice. It did not win any of these nominations. In 2017, Paste's Ashley Laderer ranked it as the best music video for an emo song. In 2024, a readers poll for Alternative Press placed "Helena" as the best music video from the 2000s, with staff writers describing the video as one of My Chemical Romance's "most stunning and impressive performances". Aliya Chaudhry of Kerrang! ranked it as the band's best music video, believing that it demonstrated the band's artistic ability. They further wrote that the music video could be considered one of the greatest ever made.

== Live performances ==
"Helena" is among My Chemical Romance's most performed songs at their concerts, where it is typically played as a closing track. By February 2024, it had been performed over 600 times and was the band's second most performed song live behind "I'm Not Okay (I Promise)". "Helena" was performed at the 2005 MTV Video Music Awards, with audience members participating in the performance by unfolding white umbrellas. During the band's 2007 tour to promote their third studio album The Black Parade (2006), "Helena" was typically the last song performed on the standard set list. Before the band's temporary breakup in 2013, "Helena" was the last song they performed live, as the closing track of their final performance on May 19, 2012, at Asbury Park, New Jersey.

== Credits and personnel ==
Credits adapted from iTunes.

My Chemical Romance

- Gerard Way – lead vocals, songwriter
- Ray Toro – lead guitar, backing vocals, songwriter
- Frank Iero – rhythm guitar, backing vocals, songwriter
- Mikey Way – bass guitar, songwriter
- Matt Pelissier – drums, percussion, songwriter

Additional personnel

- Howard Benson – Hammond organ, samples, producer, mixing engineer
- Paul DeCarli - editing engineer
- Rich Costey - mixing engineer
- Tom Baker - mastering engineer
- Keith Nelson - guitar technician
- Jon Nicholson - drum technician
- Eric Miller - engineer
- Mike Plotnikoff - engineer

== Charts ==
=== Weekly charts ===
2005 weekly chart performance for "Helena"
Chart (2005)	Peak position
Australia (ARIA)	78
Germany (GfK)	67
Ireland (IRMA)	46
New Zealand (Recorded Music NZ)	27
Scottish Singles Sales (Official Charts)	19
UK Singles (Official Charts)	20
UK Rock & Metal (OCC)	1
US Billboard Hot 100	33
US Alternative Airplay (Billboard)	11
US Pop 100 (Billboard)	32

2019 weekly chart performance for "Helena"
Chart (2019)	Peak position
US Hot Rock & Alternative Songs (Billboard)	19

2025 chart performance for "Helena"
Chart (2025)	Peak position
Malaysia (IFPI)	15
Malaysia International (RIM)	12

=== Year-end charts ===
2005 year-end chart performance for "Helena"
Chart (2005)	Position
US Modern Rock Tracks (Billboard)	25

== Certifications ==
Certifications for "Helena"
Region	Certification	Certified units/sales
Canada (Music Canada)	2× Platinum	160,000^{‡}
New Zealand (RMNZ)	Platinum	30,000^{‡}
United Kingdom (BPI)	Platinum	600,000^{‡}
United States (RIAA)	4× Platinum	4,000,000^{‡}
^{‡} Sales+streaming figures based on certification alone.
