= Headfirst for Halos =

2004 single by My Chemical Romance

Single by My Chemical Romance

from the album I Brought You My Bullets, You Brought Me Your Love
- B-side: "Our Lady of Sorrows" (live)
- Released: April 3, 2004
- Recorded: May 2002
- Studio: Nada Studios, New Windsor
- Genre: Punk rock; Pop-punk; glam rock
- Length: 3:30
- Label: Eyeball
- Songwriters: Frank Iero; Matt Pelissier; Ray Toro; Gerard Way; Mikey Way
- Producer: Geoff Rickly

My Chemical Romance singles chronology
"Honey, This Mirror Isn't Big Enough for the Two of Us" (2003)	"Headfirst for Halos" (2004)	"I'm Not Okay (I Promise)" (2004)

"Headfirst for Halos" is a song by the American rock band My Chemical Romance from their debut studio album, I Brought You My Bullets, You Brought Me Your Love (2002). It was released as a single on April 3, 2004. A punk rock, pop-punk, and glam rock song, the song combines an upbeat "arena style" composition with lyrics about drug addiction and suicide. The idea of the song was originally conceived as a joke, though as the band continued work on it, the band realized that being able to finish the song would challenge themselves, as well as expand their potential.

The song received positive responses from critics, who highlighted the song's juxtaposition of pop-like instrumentals with strong lyrics, and some have considered it one of the My Chemical Romance's best songs. The song charted in the United Kingdom, reaching number 80 on the UK singles chart and 13 on the UK indie chart. The music style present in the song has been attributed to helping establish the tone of the band's future work. My Chemical Romance has included "Headfirst for Halos" on the set lists of their various live performances, including during their 2019-2023 reunion tour, and the 2025-2026 Long Live The Black Parade tour.

== Background, production and release ==
My Chemical Romance was formed after the band's frontman, Gerard Way, witnessed the collapse of the World Trade Center during the September 11 attacks. Shortly afterwards, he was joined by drummer Matt Pelissier, guitarist Ray Toro, bassist Mikey Way, and later on guitarist Frank Iero. In May 2002, the band went to Nada Record Studio in New Windsor, New York to begin recording their first studio album, I Brought You My Bullets, You Brought Me Your Love.

In-between recording sessions for the album during its production, the band conceived "Headfirst for Halos", a more pop-like song that was intended as a joke. However, as the band continued work on the idea, they realized that the song would not only allow the band to challenge themselves, but also expand their potential; during its creation, the band described it as "jagged bubblegum punk" and compared it to a knock-off of a song by the Beatles; Gerard Way said that the song didn't "sound like anything" during production, and its potential was only fully realized when it was completed. The beginning guitar to "Headfirst for Halos" was musically inspired by the works of Van Halen and Queen. Way would later state on Twitter that they wanted the song to sound like "thrash Beatles". The album, including "Headfirst for Halos", was produced by Geoff Rickly.

I Brought You My Bullets, You Brought Me Your Love was released on July 23, 2002 through Eyeball Records; "Headfirst for Halos" is the sixth song on the standard track list. The song was released as a single on April 3, 2004, with a live version of "Our Lady of Sorrows" being included as a B-side on both of the physical releases. In the United Kingdom, the song reached number 80 on the UK singles chart, number 13 on the UK Indie chart, and number 94 on the Scottish Singles Chart. Live recordings of the song were released on both the 2006 live album, Life on the Murder Scene, and the compilation album, In Honor: A Compilation to Beat Cancer (2004). Additionally, the band has performed "Headfirst for Halos" live on various occasions, including during their 2019-2023 reunion tour, and the 2025-2026 Long Live The Black Parade tour.

== Composition and lyrics ==
"Headfirst for Halos" is a punk rock, pop-punk, and glam-rock song; it is three minutes and thirty seconds long. It opens up with "fanfare" of "Queen-esque guitars", and is the "poppiest" song from I Brought You My Bullets, You Brought Me Your Love; Mike McClelland of Kludge described the song as "arena style". The song's style has been credited towards helping the band establish the sound of the band's future albums, specifically Three Cheers for Sweet Revenge (2004) and The Black Parade (2006).

Lyrically, the song is about both drug addiction and suicide, inspired by Gerard's real world mental health struggles from the time, as well as his prior experiences in musical theater as a child. The track contains lyrics such as "The red ones make me fly / And the blue ones help me fall / And I think I’ll blow my brains against the ceiling". The tone in the song's lyrics are a direct contrast with its fairly upbeat sound and production. The song ends with Gerard repeating "think happy thoughts" in a progressively aggressive manner.

== Critical reception ==
Several reviews for I Brought You My Bullets, You Brought Me Your Love highlighted "Headfirst for Halos" as a standout track from the album. Jesse Lord of IGN wrote that the song's combination of upbeat music and strong lyrics as "showcasing their morose cleverness in the bargain", and that the "sheer brilliance of this juxtaposition" was why he liked My Chemical Romance. McClelland described the song as a song that was "primed and ready for radio", and "sets you tumbling into olde tyme punk memories". A staff writer of Sputnikmusic, who was largely critical of the full album, described "Headfirst for Halos" as a "very good" song. Megan Ritt of Consequence wrote that "Headfirst for Halos" was "all rises and falls, the sweet up and down, the essential and opposing halves of a greater universal whole", and that the song's contrasting music and lyrics made it "utterly irresistible".

The song has appeared on several rankings for the band's best songs. Margaret Farrell of Stereogum considered "Headfirst for Halos" as the band's eighth best song, describing it as a "chaotic masterpiece" and a "deeply graphic depiction of depression and suicide." Cassie Whitt of Loudwire and Chloe Spinks of Gigwise ranked it twelfth and twenty-third in the band's discography respectively, with Spinks describing it as the first taste listeners would get of My Chemical Romance's "penchant for the grandiose, complex guitar riffs, and their commanding sound", and that the song was "messy" in a way that encouraged the listener to "let go and kick and flail" to the song.

== Credits and personnel ==
Credits are taken from I Brought You My Bullets, You Brought Me Your Love CD booklet, except where noted.

My Chemical Romance

- Gerard Way – vocals
- Ray Toro – guitars
- Mikey Way – bass guitar
- Matt Pelissier – drums
- Frank Iero – songwriter

Technical personnel

- Geoff Rickly – producer
- John Naclerio – recording, mixing
- Ryan Ball – mastering

== Charts ==
Chart (2004)	Peak position
Scotland (OCC)	94
UK Singles (OCC)	80
UK Indie (OCC)	13
