= The Black Parade/Living with Ghosts =

2016 studio album reissue by My Chemical Romance

Studio album (reissue) by My Chemical Romance
- Released: September 23, 2016
- Length: 89:54
- Label: Reprise
- Producers: Rob Cavallo; My Chemical Romance

My Chemical Romance chronology
May Death Never Stop You (2014)	The Black Parade/Living with Ghosts (2016)

Singles from The Black Parade/Living with Ghosts
- 1. "The Five of Us Are Dying – Rough Mix" Released: July 29, 2016

The Black Parade/Living with Ghosts is a reissue of the American rock band My Chemical Romance's third studio album, The Black Parade (2006). It was released on September 23, 2016, through Reprise Records. The reissue features two discs: the first disc contains the original album, while the second disc, Living with Ghosts, contains several unreleased demos. The demos range from early versions of songs that were included on the final record, such as "Welcome to the Black Parade" and "House of Wolves", to ones that were scrapped, like "Emily" and "All the Angels".

The reissue was originally announced in July 2016 when the band posted a teaser video of a waving flag with a black cross on it, with the piano introduction of "Welcome to the Black Parade" used as background music. Before the formal announcement of the reissue itself, many interpreted the video as indicating a possible reunion from the band, sparking rumors. It reached number 3 on the Rock & Metal Albums chart and at number 11 on the regular Albums Chart in the United Kingdom, and number 15 on the Australian Albums chart.

== Background and release ==
My Chemical Romance released their third studio album, The Black Parade, in 2006. A critical and commercial success, it went on to be certified multi-platinum by the Recording Industry Association of America (RIAA) and the British Phonographic Industry (BPI), and listed as one of Rolling Stone's 500 Greatest Albums of All Time. On July 20, 2016, My Chemical Romance posted a cryptic video of a waving flag with a black cross on it, with the piano introduction of "Welcome to the Black Parade" (2006) used as background music. At the end of the video was the date September 23, 2016. This video sparked rumors regarding the band possibly reuniting, fueled further by fans noting that the band deleted their original break-up announcement from Twitter.

Shortly after the announcement, the band announced a tenth-anniversary reissue of The Black Parade, The Black Parade/Living With Ghosts, which would include several unreleased tracks. They further clarified that the clip was related to the reissue's announcement and that the band had no intention of reuniting at the time. Two months before the release of the reissue, the band released "The Five of Us Are Dying", an early version of "Welcome to the Black Parade" that is featured on the reissue. The reissue was released on September 23, 2016 through Reprise Records. It charted at number 3 on the Rock & Metal Albums chart and at number 11 on the regular Albums Chart in the United Kingdom, and at number 15 on the Australian Albums chart.

== Content ==
The Black Parade/Living With Ghosts consists of two discs. The first disc contains a remastered version of The Black Parade, which is a concept album centered around a man dying of cancer, known as the Patient, as he nears the end of his life and reflects upon his past. It was produced by Rob Cavallo.

The second disc, Living with Ghosts, features eleven demos of songs created for The Black Parade. The demos range from unfinished versions of "Disenchanted", "House of Wolves", and "Welcome to the Black Parade", to songs that were completely cut from the final album like "Emily", "All the Angels", "Not That Kind of Girl", and "Party at the End of the World". A demo of the B-side's "Kill All Your Friends" and "My Way Home Is Through You", which were initially cut from the final album, are also included. Some of the demos share similar themes as tracks that would be included on the final album, such as "All the Angels", which is thematically similar to "Cancer". Meanwhile, others depict themes or characters that were completely cut. An example of this is "Emily", which depicts the story of someone who went missing. A studio demo of "Someone Out There Loves You"—formerly known as "Stay" by fans—was going to be included, but guitarist Frank Iero said that "we didn't feel we were ready to put it out there", explaining that "it had lyrical reservations" that prevented its release.

== Critical reception ==
Professional ratings
Review scores
Source	Rating
AllMusic	4.5/5 stars
Rock Sound	8/10

Stephen Thomas Erlewine of AllMusic believed that reissuing The Black Parade with demos included provided great insight into the production and writing process of My Chemical Romance's work. He wrote that the tracks allowed a listener to experience how the band developed The Black Parade throughout its production and described that the relationship between the two discs demonstrated My Chemical Romance at their polished best, while Living with Ghosts "reveals them as an exposed nerve".

Discussing the differences between the tracks included on Living with Ghosts and those that made it onto The Black Parade, Cassie Whitt and Jason Pettigrew of Alternative Press said that playing "spot the difference" was a "truly enlightening treasure hunt". They further highlighted the song "Emily", believing it to be "without competition, My Chemical Romance's darkest song" and one that provided the most insight behind the development of The Black Parade's narrative. Gav Lloyd of Rock Sound echoed similar thoughts, stating that it provided "fascinating insight into the makings of such a landmark album", and described it as essential listening for My Chemical Romance fans.

== Track listing ==
All tracks are written by Bob Bryar, Frank Iero, Ray Toro, Gerard Way and Mikey Way.

Disc 1 (The Black Parade)
No.	Title	Length
1.	"The End."	1:52
2.	"Dead!"	3:15
3.	"This Is How I Disappear"	3:59
4.	"The Sharpest Lives"	3:20
5.	"Welcome to the Black Parade"	5:11
6.	"I Don't Love You"	3:58
7.	"House of Wolves"	3:04
8.	"Cancer"	2:22
9.	"Mama" (featuring Liza Minnelli)	4:39
10.	"Sleep"	4:43
11.	"Teenagers"	2:41
12.	"Disenchanted"	4:55
13.	"Famous Last Words"	4:59
14.	"Blood" (hidden track; starts at 1:31)	2:53
Total length:		51:51

Disc 1 (The Black Parade) (Japanese Version)
No.	Title	Length
15.	"Heaven Help Us"	2:56
Total length:		54:07

Disc 2 (Living with Ghosts)
No.	Title	Length
1.	"The Five of Us Are Dying" (rough mix)	3:49
2.	"Kill All Your Friends" (live demo)	4:22
3.	"Party at the End of the World" (live demo)	2:47
4.	"Mama" (live demo)	3:59
5.	"My Way Home Is Through You" (live demo)	2:45
6.	"Not That Kind of Girl" (live demo)	3:03
7.	"House of Wolves (version 1)" (live demo)	4:00
8.	"House of Wolves (version 2)" (live demo)	2:52
9.	"Emily" (rough mix)	3:11
10.	"Disenchanted" (live demo)	4:01
11.	"All the Angels" (live demo)	3:13
Total length:		38:02

== Personnel ==
My Chemical Romance

- Bob Bryar – drums, percussion
- Frank Iero – guitars, backing vocals
- Ray Toro – guitars, backing vocals
- Gerard Way – lead vocals
- Mikey Way – bass guitar

== Charts ==
Chart (2016)	Peak position
Australian Albums (ARIA)	15
Japanese Albums (Oricon)	192
Scottish Albums (Official Charts)	12
UK Albums (Official Charts)	11
UK Rock & Metal Albums (Official Charts)	3
