= Vampires Will Never Hurt You =

2002 song by My Chemical Romance

Promotional single by My Chemical Romance

from the album I Brought You My Bullets, You Brought Me Your Love
- B-side: "Skylines and Turnstiles"; "Cubicles"
- Released: July 23, 2002
- Recorded: March 3, 2002
- Studio: Nada, New Windsor
- Genre: Emo
- Length: 5:26
- Label: Eyeball
- Songwriters: Matt Pelissier; Ray Toro; Gerard Way; Mikey Way
- Producers: Geoff Rickly; Alex Saavedra

"Vampires Will Never Hurt You" is a song by the American rock band My Chemical Romance from their debut album, I Brought You My Bullets, You Brought Me Your Love (2002). The song was written by band members Matt Pelissier, Ray Toro, Gerard Way, and Mikey Way, and was produced by Geoff Rickly and Alex Saavedra. The third track on the album, it was recorded on March 3, 2002 at Nada Studios; while the recording was intended to be a demo, the group decided to use it as the song's final version due to its intensity. The song was posted on My Chemical Romance's Myspace page soon after its recording, being the first song the band released online.

An emo song, the lyrics of "Vampires Will Never Hurt You" tell the story of a person transforming into a vampire, viewed as a metaphor for resisting daily forces of corruption. The song received generally positive reviews from music critics, having been regarded as being one of the best songs in the band's discography despite criticism towards its lyrics. An accompanying music video was produced, having a wider release in 2005. The song was also included on May Death Never Stop You, the band's 2014 greatest hits album.

== Background and recording ==
Before Gerard Way formed My Chemical Romance, he was a comic book artist who was working on comics about vampires. Upon witnessing the September 11 attacks, however, he decided to start a band in an attempt to "take stock of his own life"; Way spent time writing music in his parents' basement using only his guitar, including the majority of "Vampires Will Never Hurt You". Initially, the band had trouble convincing Geoff Rickly, the lead singer of Thursday, to take part in the creation of their first album, I Brought You My Bullets, You Brought Me Your Love. However, upon hearing an early demo CD of "Vampires Will Never Hurt You", Rickly agreed to produce the album, as he had "never heard anything quite like it" before.

Later, on the advice of Alex Saavedra, the founder of Eyeball Records, My Chemical Romance set out to record a demo of "Vampires Will Never Hurt You" on March 3, 2002, at Nada Studios in New Windsor, New York. However, on the day of the recording, an abscess in Way's tooth led to him being in too much pain to sing; in the middle of the session, he left with the mother of their then-manager Sarah Lewitinn to get emergency dental work. Following the procedure, Way returned to the studio; however, due to being under the influence of pain medication, Way was "woozy and slurring", and his vocal takes became emotionless.

Because of budget constraints, which prohibited the band from affording another day in the studio, Saavedra initially attempted to get a good vocal take by hiding Way's pain medication, before deciding to punch him in the mouth. Enraged, Way proceeded to "unleash everything into the mic", which Rickly described as "sounding like a really pissed-off kid wanting to tear himself apart". My Chemical Romance biographer Tom Bryant later wrote that the punch served as a way for Way to more easily method act the character, with Way noting in an interview that the recording of "Vampires Will Never Hurt You" was the first time he used the technique when singing. The group later decided to use this version, despite initially recording it as a demo, as the final, finished recording due to its intensity. The song was written by band members Matt Pelissier, Ray Toro, Gerard Way, and Mikey Way, and was produced by Rickly and Saavedra. Way would later say that "Vampires Will Never Hurt You" gave the band a "real sense of identity", and called the song, and his vocal performance on it, his favorites of all time on Twitter in 2013.

== Composition and lyrics ==
Musically, "Vampires Will Never Hurt You" is an emo song, which Harper Lane of Gigwise characterized as blending "punk energy with dark themes". The song begins with a "lulling" intro consisting of pulsing percussion and a "slow-burning" guitar riff, before the first chorus changes its tone into "hardcore aggressive rock" for the remainder of the track. Frank Iero recalled that Toro recorded "about fourteen different guitar parts", most of which overlapped on top of each other, for the song.

Lyrically, "Vampires Will Never Hurt You" tells the story of a person lamenting his transformation into a vampire, asking his lover to stake his heart and wanting to "shoot holy water like cheap whiskey". However, Gerard Way revealed that the song was actually about the "early signs of [his] alcoholism", his feelings of wasting his life, and "feeling generally like a scumbag". Sam Law of Kerrang! noted how certain lyrics in the song talk of "everyday forces of corruption and the struggle to keep hold of oneself"; Cassie Whitt of Loudwire suggested that the vampires metaphorically represented these forces of corruption. Bryant observed how the song consists of "gothic imagery", owing to Rickly encouraging Way to see his band and songwriting as a comic book.

== Release and promotion ==
According to Iero, "Vampires Will Never Hurt You" was the first song My Chemical Romance released online, having been posted on their Myspace page soon after it was recorded. The song was later released on July 23, 2002, as the third track on their debut album I Brought You My Bullets, You Brought Me Your Love (2002). The track was later submitted to and aired on the local college-radio station WSOU; the radio single was released with demos of "Skylines and Turnstiles" and "Cubicles" as B-sides. "Vampires Will Never Hurt You" was also included on May Death Never Stop You, the band's 2014 greatest hits album. In 2022, in honor of the 20th anniversary of I Brought You My Bullets, the track was released on a limited-edition flexi disc via the Spotify Fans First program.

An accompanying music video was produced, being widely released in 2005. The video has performed poorly in rankings of My Chemical Romance's music videos, despite praise towards Gerard Way's "energetic and expressive" performance. My Chemical Romance performed "Vampires Will Never Hurt You" live as part of their early shows, directly after the album's release. Additionally, the song remains one of the only from I Brought You My Bullets to continue appearing regularly in the band's live sets, with performances in both the setlists and encores of their reunion tour, and during their Long Live The Black Parade tour.

== Reception ==
"Vampires Will Never Hurt You" has been recognized as a fan favorite, and was met with generally positive reviews from both contemporary and retrospective music critics. The staff of Alternative Press wrote that the song "stands up as one of the better songs the band have written", despite the rest of the album being otherwise unrefined. Desiree Bowie, writing for the Recording Academy, similarly praised the song as a "hint at the future of the band's sound", while Caroline Sullivan of The Guardian instead described the track as being "the juiciest tune the Ramones never wrote". However, the song's lyrics have come under criticism: DaveyBoy's review of the album for Sputnikmusic described the track as having an "overlong mumbo-jumbo of lyrics" despite its ambition, while Stephen Haag of PopMatters instead criticized the lyrics for "truly seem[ing] to be about vampires" and being "bereft of metaphor". Nonetheless, the lyrical themes of "Vampires Will Never Hurt You" have also resonated with critics, with the track appearing on multiple lists of the best songs about vampires.

The song has been identified as being one of the most well-known songs from I Brought You My Bullets, and has placed well in rankings of My Chemical Romance's discography. The staff of Billboard included the track in their list of the band's 15 best songs, with Taylor Weatherby declaring the lyric "And these thoughts of endless night / Bring us back into the light / Can you stake my heart?" as being one of the band's "most outlandishly emo" lyrics. Bryant, writing for Louder Sound, ranked "Vampires Will Never Hurt You" as their sixth-best song due to being "brooding, building, intense and dark", while Law ranked the song as the band's fifteenth-best, calling it a "gleefully theatrical, blood-sucking earworm". In a ranking of the band's entire discography, Cassie Whitt and Jake Richardson of Loudwire placed the song at number 8 (of 71), with the former citing the song's role in establishing the sound and aesthetic for the band. In contrast, Chloe Spinks of Gigwise placed the song at number 60 (of 79) in her ranking of the band's entire discography, despite praising it as being "one of more complex and interesting compositions" on I Brought You My Bullets.

== Credits and personnel ==
Credits are taken from I Brought You My Bullets, You Brought Me Your Love CD booklet.

My Chemical Romance

- Gerard Way – vocals
- Ray Toro – guitars
- Mikey Way – bass guitar
- Matt Pelissier – drums

Technical personnel

- Geoff Rickly – producer
- Alex Saavedra – producer
- John Naclerio – recording, mixing
- Ryan Ball – mastering
