= I Brought You My Bullets, You Brought Me Your Love =

2002 studio album by My Chemical Romance

Studio album by My Chemical Romance
- Released: July 23, 2002
- Recorded: May 2002
- Studio: Nada Recording (New Windsor, New York)
- Genres: Post-hardcore; emo; punk rock; pop-punk
- Length: 40:57
- Label: Eyeball
- Producers: Geoff Rickly; Alex Saavedra

My Chemical Romance chronology
I Brought You My Bullets, You Brought Me Your Love (2002)	Three Cheers for Sweet Revenge (2004)

Singles from I Brought You My Bullets, You Brought Me Your Love
- 1. "Honey, This Mirror Isn't Big Enough for the Two of Us" Released: December 15, 2003; 2. "Headfirst for Halos" Released: April 3, 2004

I Brought You My Bullets, You Brought Me Your Love (often shortened to Bullets) is the debut studio album by the American rock band My Chemical Romance, released on July 23, 2002, through Eyeball Records. It was produced by Geoff Rickly and recorded at the Nada Recording Studio in New Windsor, New York. The album was initially conceived in 2002 during the band's recording sessions for existing music that they had written prior, and was produced and recorded over the course of seven days.

A post-hardcore, emo, punk rock and pop-punk album, I Brought You My Bullets, You Brought Me Your Love features a composition style that was unique from contemporary emo music at the time of its release. The album's eleven songs cover a variety of subjects, though the album's central themes include depression, pessimism, anger, and disillusionment. Some have considered it to be a concept album, although significant connections between tracks have generally only been made by fans. The album was supported by the promotional single "Vampires Will Never Hurt You", as well as the singles "Honey, This Mirror Isn't Big Enough for the Two of Us" and "Headfirst for Halos".

The album did not receive much attention from critics or listeners upon its initial release, with the album only charting beginning in 2004 and reviews being scarce. As the album received more attention, it was met with mixed reviews from critics on the album, who were divided on its lyrics, themes, and composition. It has been considered influential on the emo music genre for its unique style and has been certified gold by the British Phonographic Industry.

== Background ==
My Chemical Romance was formed after the band's frontman, Gerard Way, witnessed the collapse of the World Trade Center during the September 11 attacks. Joining him to create the band was drummer Matt Pelissier, guitarist Ray Toro, and bassist Mikey Way. Shortly after the band formed, they created three songs—"Skylines and Turnstiles", "Cubicles", and "Bring More Knives"—in a makeshift studio set up in Pelissier's attic. These recordings have since been referred to as the "Attic Demos".

These recordings were then brought to Eyeball Records' Alex Saavedra, who was impressed by the band's work and continued working with them during their beginnings. He later sent a demo of another song that the band was working on, "Vampires Will Never Hurt You", to music producer and Thursday lead vocalist Geoff Rickly. Shortly afterwards, the band would play their first live concert in Ewing, New Jersey, in October 2001, and played several more shows afterwards. They also worked on new material in-between performances.

== Production and writing ==
By March 2002, the band began properly recording new demos at the Nada Recording Studio, contemplating whether or not to start work on a proper album while continuing work on "Vampires Will Never Hurt You". After the song's final version was complete, Pencey Prep frontman Frank Iero, who had previously already witnessed the band's past recording sessions, joined My Chemical Romance. In May 2002, the band began work on I Brought You My Bullets, You Brought Me Your Love. which would serve as their debut record.

The album was recorded and produced in the span of only a week with practically no budget; during production, all five members of the band and some of the production crew shared a single hotel room. Rickly served as the album's producer, and Alex Saavedra produced two of the album's tracks along with Rickly. John Naclerio helped record and mix the album, and Ryan Ball mastered the album. Its cover was designed by Marc Debiak and Gerard, and Saavedra provided additional photography. Despite joining the band a couple of days before production had begun, Iero was only able to perform on two of the album's tracks, namely "Honey, This Mirror Isn't Big Enough for the Two of Us" and "Early Sunsets Over Monroeville", due to time constraints. My Chemical Romance biographer Tom Bryant described the development of the album as "rushed", and that the band "struggled with direction" while writing it due to their experimentation with what kind of music they wanted to create.

When creating the songs on the album, Gerard wrote them to be akin to their own individual short stories, reusing titles from his past works for song names; the album's title was also named after a short story that Gerard had written prior. His writing process involved writing lyrics from the perspectives of characters within each story, and acting as that said character while recording the song. During recording, Rickly recommended to Gerard that he interpret the creation of the album as like writing a comic book, based on Gerard's prior experience as an artist. Several songs on the album were influenced by comic book themes, implementing ideas such as gothic imagery and zombies.

== Composition and themes ==
I Brought You My Bullets, You Brought Me Your Love is considered an emo, post-hardcore, punk-rock, and pop-punk album. It also features influences from hardcore punk, heavy metal and horror punk. The style of the album, which combined several genres to create a unique style and sound, greatly differed from traditional emo acts of the time like Taking Back Sunday and the Used. Due to the differences in sound and lyrics between those bands and My Chemical Romance, the latter frequently rejected the emo label, though they have still been considered figureheads within the genre. Lyrically, the album's central themes include depression, pessimism, anger, and disillusionment, though the settings of each song varies. Some have considered I Brought You My Bullets, You Brought Me Your Love to be a concept album, with a story centered around two lovers inspired by Bonnie and Clyde, an idea later affirmed by Rickly. However, many of the alleged connections between songs have only been noticed by fans.

=== Songs ===
I Brought You My Bullets, You Brought Me Your Love consists of 11 songs. It opens up with an instrumental based on the "Romance" guitar piece, before directly leading into "Honey, This Mirror Isn't Big Enough For The Two of Us", a metalcore influenced song about consuming antidepressants and alcohol. "Vampires Will Never Hurt You" tells the story of someone lamenting their transformation into a vampire, while also being an auto-biographical song about the early stages of Gerard's alcoholism. It starts off as a slower song, before turning into hardcore punk. "Drowning Lessons" is a song where the band explores the "question of mortality". While its true meaning was never officially disclosed by Gerard, the song is seemingly about a man who either kills his lover, or witnesses their death, and must relive the experience over and over again. "Our Lady of Sorrows" is a "raw, adrenaline-inducing punk-rock" song about revenge, and uses metaphors to reference the "dark forces" that led Gerard to begin writing stories.

"Headfirst for Halos" is about both welcoming suicide and overdosing on drugs. It is considered to be the origin of how the band's future works would sound, and was conceived as a joke song before the band decided to challenge themselves by completing it; during production, the band described it as "jagged bubblegum punk" and something that sounded like the Beatles, before they completed it and realized that the song could influence their future work. "Skylines and Turnstiles" is centered around the September 11 attacks, focusing on the emotions that Gerard felt after witnessing the events. "Early Sunsets Over Monroeville" was inspired by the 1978 zombie horror film Dawn of the Dead, telling the story of a group of lovers attempting to survive the apocalypse. "This Is The Best Day Ever" is about the idea of trying to break free from everyday life, and features additional vocals by Rickly. The tenth song on the album is "Cubicles".

"Demolition Lovers"
An excerpt of the ending of "Demolition Lovers", which illustrates the demise of the titular characters in a "hail of bullets"

The final song on the album is "Demolition Lovers", which has been considered an extension of "Drowning Lessons". At about six minutes long, it starts off slow, and during its buildup suddenly stops at around the 2:50 mark before starting back up again in a completely different, minimalist style. Throughout its runtime, the song goes through several unique movements before its abrupt ending. The song follows the titular Demolition Lovers as they go on a crime spree, ultimately dying in a "hail of bullets". The song has generally been considered an analogy on Gerard's willingness to die for his loved ones based on the text present in the album's inlay. The premise of "Demolition Lovers" has been tied to the concept of the band's next studio album, Three Cheers for Sweet Revenge (2004), which loosely follows the story of two separated lovers that can only reunite if one of them kills a thousand people. It has also been considered representative of the band's future, grander scale recordings.

== Release and commercial performance ==
I Brought You My Bullets, You Brought Me Your Love was released on July 23, 2002, through Eyeball Records. Due to the lack of awareness surrounding the band and the album at its initial release, Saavedra tried to promote the album by sending copies of it to local radio stations, journalists, and DJs. Saavedra also pushed My Chemical Romance to play at as many shows as possible as part of this effort. Over the course of six months, the band would play a variety of shows at different venues, ranging from garages and basements to dive bars. In a 2016 interview with Alternative Press, Iero stated that the original pressing of I Brought You My Bullets, You Brought Me Your Love was the band's rarest release, limited to 100 copies. He also said that a large amount of the original copies were misprints, consisting entirely of unknown mariachi songs instead of My Chemical Romance tracks. Due to Eyeball Records being a smaller record label that did not have the manufacturing capabilities of larger publishers, sales of I Brought You My Bullets, You Brought Me Your Love were slow even after the band gained traction.

The first song from the album to be aired onto radio stations from the album was "Vampires Will Never Hurt You", which local DJ Mario Comesanas played on college-radio station WSOU. Upon the song's positive response from audiences, the record label began expanding its workforce and the band gained popularity, prompting the band's aforementioned promotional shows. Following the radio premiere of "Vampires Will Never Hurt You", two singles from the album were released: "Honey, This Mirror Isn't Big Enough for the Two of Us" on December 13, 2003, and "Headfirst for Halos" on April 3, 2004.

I Brought You My Bullets, You Brought Me Your Love first appeared on the UK Independent Albums chart in 2004, peaking at number 31 that year. Its all-time peak on the chart was number 8 in 2007. It later appeared at number 129 on the UK Albums chart. In 2007, the album was certified gold by the British Phonographic Industry, selling a confirmed 100,000 units.

== Critical reception ==
Professional ratings
Review scores
Source	Rating
AllMusic	2.5/5 stars
Alternative Press	5/5 stars
Drowned in Sound	8/10 stars
The Guardian	3/5 stars
IGN	7.9/10
Rolling Stone	3/5 stars

I Brought You My Bullets, You Brought Me Your Love did not receive many critic reviews upon its release. Media outlets and magazines that generally wrote about the genre the album was associated with, such as Alternative Press, did not review it at first, while magazines such as Kerrang! and The Guardian did. The album was reviewed by more critics as time went on, with reviews being published by outlets such as IGN and the aforementioned Alternative Press, and future retrospective pieces being published by websites such as Consequence of Sound.

Critics were divided on the album's writing and themes. Jesse Lord of IGN wrote that the album was a "truly unique listening experience", one where lyrics that would otherwise be viewed as "standard emo-ish lyrics" were presented in a way that made the album "vastly darker and more sinister" than an average emo record. They further described the album as "one of the most interesting aural experiences" that they had had. Rolling Stone described the album as reading like a list of things that caused Gerard to "grow up too fast", and that it was "designed to make you feel sixteen-years-old again, experiencing every heartache as if it's on scale with the World Trade Center crumbling down". Megan Ritt of Consequence of Sound highlighted what she believed was the album's emotional value. AllMusic's Alex Henderson believed that the album's lyrics were similar to other songs written by other bands, and that the album simply "fell short of exceptional" in comparison, though he believed that the album was a good debut for the band. Drowned in Sound felt that album's lyrics when viewed separately sounded "ridiculous".

The album's music style and composition were met with a mixed response. Rolling Stone praised the music, writing that it combined with the lyrics to help create what he compared to the "frenetic build-up to an over-the-top climax that you find in horror movies". Emily Zemler of Alternative Press described the album as being "relatively makeshift" with moments that were "haphazard", though felt that the style and those moments helped give the album its charm. Drowned in Sound believed that the album had "undeniable fragmentation" as a lack of consistency between its tracks, though felt that this allowed the songs to stand on their own.

== Legacy ==
The music style that My Chemical Romance demonstrated in I Brought You My Bullets, You Brought Me Your Love has been considered influential of the sound of the emo music genre, due to its unorthodox composition style compared to contemporary emo bands at the time. In a 2022 retrospective article, Chris Payne of Stereogum wrote that while the album wasn't My Chemical Romance's best work, it helped combine several different genres into one, and stated that the album was a good start to "one of the greatest three-album runs in rock history", with the other two being Three Cheers for Sweet Revenge and The Black Parade (2006).

While very few songs from I Brought You My Bullets, You Brought Me Your Love have been consistently performed at My Chemical Romance's live shows, "Vampires Will Never Hurt You" and "Our Lady Of Sorrows" became concert staples. "Drowning Lessons" stopped being played by 2004 since the band considered it bad luck to perform live. Since their reunion tour, "This Is the Best Day Ever" and "Demolition Lovers" were played for the first time in over twenty years.

Two songs from the album, namely "Vampires Will Never Hurt You" and "Honey, This Mirror Isn't Big Enough for the Two Of Us", were included on the band's greatest hits album May Death Never Stop You, released on March 25, 2014. The compilation also features the band's three "Attic Demos".

== Track listing ==
All tracks are written by My Chemical Romance. (Note: "Romance" is a guitar piece which has no known author.)

Standard edition
No.	Title	Length
1.	"Romance" (instrumental)	1:02
2.	"Honey, This Mirror Isn't Big Enough for the Two of Us"	3:51
3.	"Vampires Will Never Hurt You"	5:26
4.	"Drowning Lessons"	4:23
5.	"Our Lady of Sorrows"	2:05
6.	"Headfirst for Halos"	3:28
7.	"Skylines and Turnstiles"	3:23
8.	"Early Sunsets Over Monroeville"	5:05
9.	"This Is the Best Day Ever"	2:12
10.	"Cubicles"	3:51
11.	"Demolition Lovers"	6:06
Total length:		40:57

Re-release/iTunes deluxe edition bonus videos
No.	Title	Length
12.	"Honey, This Mirror Isn't Big Enough for the Two of Us" (video)	3:53
13.	"Vampires Will Never Hurt You" (video)	5:37
Total length:		50:27

== Personnel ==
My Chemical Romance

- Gerard Way – vocals
- Ray Toro – guitars
- Mikey Way – bass guitar
- Matt Pelissier – drums
- Frank Iero – guitars (tracks 2 and 8)

Technical

- Geoff Rickly – producer (all tracks)
- Alex Saavedra – producer (tracks 3 and 8), photos
- John Naclerio – recording, mixing
- Ryan Ball – mastering
- Marc Debiak and Gerard Way – cover art design

== Charts ==
2007 chart performance for I Brought You My Bullets, You Brought Me Your Love
Chart (2007)	Peak position
UK Albums (OCC)	129
UK Independent Albums (Official Charts)	8

2015 chart performance for I Brought You My Bullets, You Brought Me Your Love
Chart (2015)	Peak position
UK Rock & Metal Albums (Official Charts)	29
US Top Catalog Albums (Billboard)	28
US Vinyl Albums (Billboard)	2

2022 chart performance for I Brought You My Bullets, You Brought Me Your Love
Chart (2022)	Peak position
US Top Album Sales (Billboard)	86

== Certifications ==
Certifications for I Brought You My Bullets, You Brought Me Your Love
Region	Certification	Certified units/sales
United Kingdom (BPI)	Gold	100,000^{^}
^{^} Shipments figures based on certification alone.
