= Three Cheers for Sweet Revenge =

2004 studio album by My Chemical Romance

Studio album by My Chemical Romance
- Released: June 8, 2004
- Recorded: 2003–March 2004
- Studios: Bay 7 Studios (Valley Village, California); Sparky Dark Studios (Calabasas, California)
- Genres: Emo; alternative rock; pop-punk; post-hardcore; punk rock
- Length: 39:36
- Label: Reprise
- Producer: Howard Benson

My Chemical Romance chronology
| I Brought You My Bullets, You Brought Me Your Love (2002) | Three Cheers for Sweet Revenge (2004) | Life on the Murder Scene (2006) |

2025 Deluxe Edition cover

Singles from Three Cheers for Sweet Revenge
- 1. "I'm Not Okay (I Promise)" Released: September 28, 2004; 2. "Helena" Released: March 8, 2005; 3. "The Ghost of You" Released: August 29, 2005

Three Cheers for Sweet Revenge (also shortened to Three Cheers or Revenge) is the second studio album by the American rock band My Chemical Romance, released on June 8, 2004, by Reprise Records. The album was produced by Howard Benson, and was written and recorded from late 2003 to March 2004. Writing sessions were highly influenced by the mental health and personal lives of the band members, particularly the death of Gerard and Mikey Way's grandmother.

Three Cheers has been characterized as multiple genres: emo, alternative rock, pop-punk, post-hardcore, punk rock, and pop rock. The album featured an extended production period, which marked a shift from the band's preceding release, I Brought You My Bullets, You Brought Me Your Love (2002). The style of tracks on the album range from punk rock and pop-structured tracks, while its central themes include love, loss, and revenge, while some songs also explore gender identity and sexuality. Revenge follows a loose narrative that serves as a continuation of "Demolition Lovers" from Bullets; following the titular characters deaths, they are separated between heaven and hell, only able to re-unite should the male lover harvest the souls of a thousand men.

The album received positive reviews from critics upon release for its brevity and polished sound. It was certified platinum by the Recording Industry Association of America (RIAA) less than a year after its release, and has sold over three million copies in the United States, becoming a commercial success for the band and Reprise. The album produced three singles—"I'm Not Okay (I Promise)", "Helena", and "The Ghost of You". A "deluxe edition" of the album, with all of the original tracks remixed and four live recordings, was released on June 6, 2025.

== Background ==
My Chemical Romance released their debut studio album I Brought You My Bullets, You Brought Me Your Love in July 2002 through Eyeball Records. While moderately successful, its success was limited by the band's small fan base at the time. Their popularity grew as the band continued promoting the album by opening for more popular bands, and they began to receive offers from several record labels. Among them was Reprise, a subsidiary of Warner Records. After several meetings with Craig Aaronson, a representative of Reprise, they signed a deal with the label in August 2003.

They began writing material for their second album while touring in late 2003, still supporting Bullets. By the time that touring had concluded in November, they had already created a good amount of songs from the album. One day after the band's touring concluded, the grandmother of lead singer Gerard Way and bassist Mikey Way, Elena, died. The two brothers were heavily impacted by her death, with Gerard Way being left frustrated with himself over not being able to see her one last time. Determined to honor her, he began writing a song in her memory, "Helena", where he expressed great self-hatred in its lyrics. The tone and theming of "Helena" would go on to influence the tone of their album, with Gerard Way stating that "the emotions I went through [when she died] and over the next six days were what completely fueled" the album.

== Production, writing, and recording ==
Following another shorter tour throughout the United Kingdom in early 2004, the band traveled to Los Angeles to start work on their second studio album. The impact that the death of Elena left was still being felt by the brothers at this point, who believed that working on new material was one of the only places where they felt peace. The band got into contact with Warner in search of a producer and ultimately chose Howard Benson; the band submitted a demo of songs from Revenge to him shortly afterwards. The sound of the demo was highly influenced by "Headfirst for Halos", a "flamboyant" song from Bullets. Though Benson initially expressed disapproval, he wished to work with the band further. He ultimately asked if the band was willing to "piss off [their] current fans" to create the best album that they could.

Pre-production for Revenge took three weeks. This was longer than the full recording and production process of Bullets, which took only one week. With assistance from Benson, the band began to rework the material that they had already written for the album, and writing several new songs. The first song written for Revenge was "It's Not a Fashion Statement, It's a Fucking Deathwish", which was originally intended for Bullets and was written a week after the album's release. Benson wanted the band to focus on improving their songwriting and arrangement skills, and to create more elaborate choruses whenever possible; Benson's focus was on wanting the album to sound as elaborate as it could be, even if his ideas conflicted with that of the band members. Frank Iero stated that, while he sometimes disagreed with Benson's vision for the album, he often found it as working out in the end despite being unable to understand his decisions. A major focus for Benson was the album's singles; he picked what songs would be released as singles early in the album's production. He was more strict about what the band could do with these songs, though allowed for more creative freedom on other tracks.

Once songwriting and pre-production concluded, the band moved to the Bay 7 Studios to begin recording Revenge. Ray Toro took control over the composition of the album itself, effectively serving as a "musical director". The band aimed for every song on the album to sound distinct from one another, with Gerard Way putting on a different "persona" for each song and going to extremes to properly fit into the role that a song required. These extremes including playing pornography in the background of a song, taking off clothes, or attempting to manipulate his emotions. At one point, he attempted to perform while being completely drunk, resulting in what he described as the "worst take [he] ever did". The track, "Desert Song", ended up being cut from the final record.

My Chemical Romance quit working on the album by March 2004, when they went on tour throughout the United States. Benson was left to work on the album, which at the time remained mostly unmixed. Uncertain on how to handle the album's production without the band's input, he received assistance from another music producer, Rich Costey, who worked on four songs from the album to give Benson an idea on where to start.

== Music ==
=== Composition ===
Three Cheers for Sweet Revenge has been described as emo, alternative rock, pop-punk, post-hardcore, punk rock, and pop rock. The album's sound is more refined than its predecessor Bullets, which Ed Walton of Distorted Sound Magazine considered rough and unpolished. Aliya Chaudhry of Stereogum described Revenge's sound as a fusion of Toro's metal-influenced style and Iero's punk-influenced style. She also described the album's pacing as "controlled chaos", and that when it seemed like a song was about to go in a specific direction, it did the opposite.

The style of the tracks on Revenge vary. "Give 'Em Hell, Kid", "To the End", and "Thank You for the Venom" take heavier, punk-inspired approaches. Meanwhile, songs like "I'm Not Okay (I Promise)" and "Helena" are more aligned with traditional pop music. Other genre influences on specific songs include western music-influenced sound of "Hang 'Em High"; the arena rock and gothic rock sound on the power ballad "The Ghost of You"; and the glam rock inspired guitar solos on "Thank You for the Venom". Guest performances from Bert McCracken of the Used, and Keith Morris, a singer for the bands Black Flag and Circle Jerks, are featured on "You Know What They Do to Guys Like Us in Prison" and "Hang 'Em High", respectively. There are thirteen tracks in the album total, including a brief interlude midway through where Gerard Way recites a prayer.

=== Lyrics and themes ===
Revenge's central themes include love, loss, and revenge. The meanings of several songs are deeply rooted into the personal lives of the band's members, particularly the Way brothers following the death of their grandmother. Gerard Way said that "every single emotion you go through when you're grieving is on Revenge", and that "when you really break down the record, it's about two little boys losing their grandmother". Themes of coping with loss appear on songs such as "Helena", "To the End", and "Cemetery Drive". "The Ghost of You" reflects on similar themes, while also touching on the impact of war. Resurrection is referenced on "It's Not a Fashion Statement, It's a Fucking Death Wish". The final track on the album, "I Never Told You What I Do for a Living", circles back to these themes with the final acceptance of death. Other personal themes, such as exploring one's gender identity or sexuality, also appear on several songs. "To the End" loosely adapts William Faulkner's "A Rose for Emily", with themes of homosexuality from it and other works by Faulkner lingered throughout the track. "You Know What They Do to Guys Like Us in Prison" references dressing up in drag. Gerard Way stated the latter was about experiences while touring with McCracken, and the "touches on lost masculinity" experienced at the time.

Originally, Revenge was going to be a concept album that served as a continuation of the story of "Demolition Lovers", a song from Bullets. Following the death of the song's titular characters, the duo would be separated, with one in heaven and the other in hell, only able to reunite should the male partner harvest one thousand souls. The album's liner notes describes the story as "the story of a man. A woman. And the corpses of a thousand evil men". During his murder spree, he ends up in New Orleans ("Give 'Em Hell, Kid"), participates in a Western-styled shoot-out ("Hang 'Em High"), and ends up in jail ("You Know What They Do to Guys Like Us in Prison"). After his massacres are complete, he realizes that the last person he must kill is himself, resulting in his suicide ("I Never Told You What I Do for a Living"). Due to the band's shift towards making a more personal record, the final album only loosely follows the "Demolition Lovers" narrative.

Multiple songs on the album are either barely relevant to the story or are completely separated, like "Helena". In an interview with Alternative Press, Gerard Way said that his grandmother's death resulted in the band questioning how they would handle the story concept, ultimately concluding that he would only write songs that he felt like writing. "Thank You for the Venom" was written in response to critics that berated the band's music, themes, and lifestyle, and encouraging their fans to defy outside pressure. "You Know What They Do to Guys Like Us in Prison" incorporates dark humor into its lyrics, working in unison with the existing themes of sexuality in the track.

== Release and promotion ==
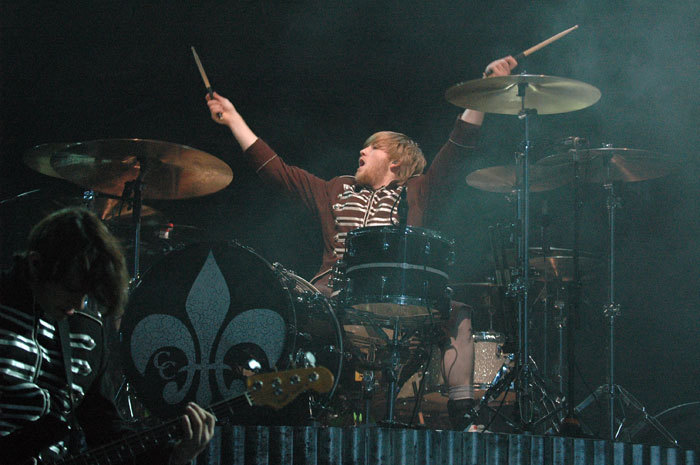
Bob Bryar (pictured in 2007) replaced Matt Pelissier as the band's drummer shortly after the release of Three Cheers.

Three Cheers for Sweet Revenge was released on June 8, 2004. The Japanese version of Three Cheers features a demo of the scrapped album track "Bury Me in Black" as a bonus. The band held a launch party for the album on July 11 at the Starland Ballroom, which 2,500 people attended. Two promotional flash games were made by the band to promote the album: "Revenge", where players would play as a saint traversing through a cathedral in order to save the Demolition Lovers, and "Helena", which put players in the role of a titular character at their funeral while they attempt to come back to life and escape their own grave.

Shortly after the release of Three Cheers for Sweet Revenge, My Chemical Romance kicked out their then-drummer Matt Pelissier, believing that he was unreliable when it came to live performances. He was replaced by Bob Bryar in less than a week. Bryar would go on to appear on most of the associated music videos for Three Cheers for Sweet Revenge.

=== Singles and music videos ===
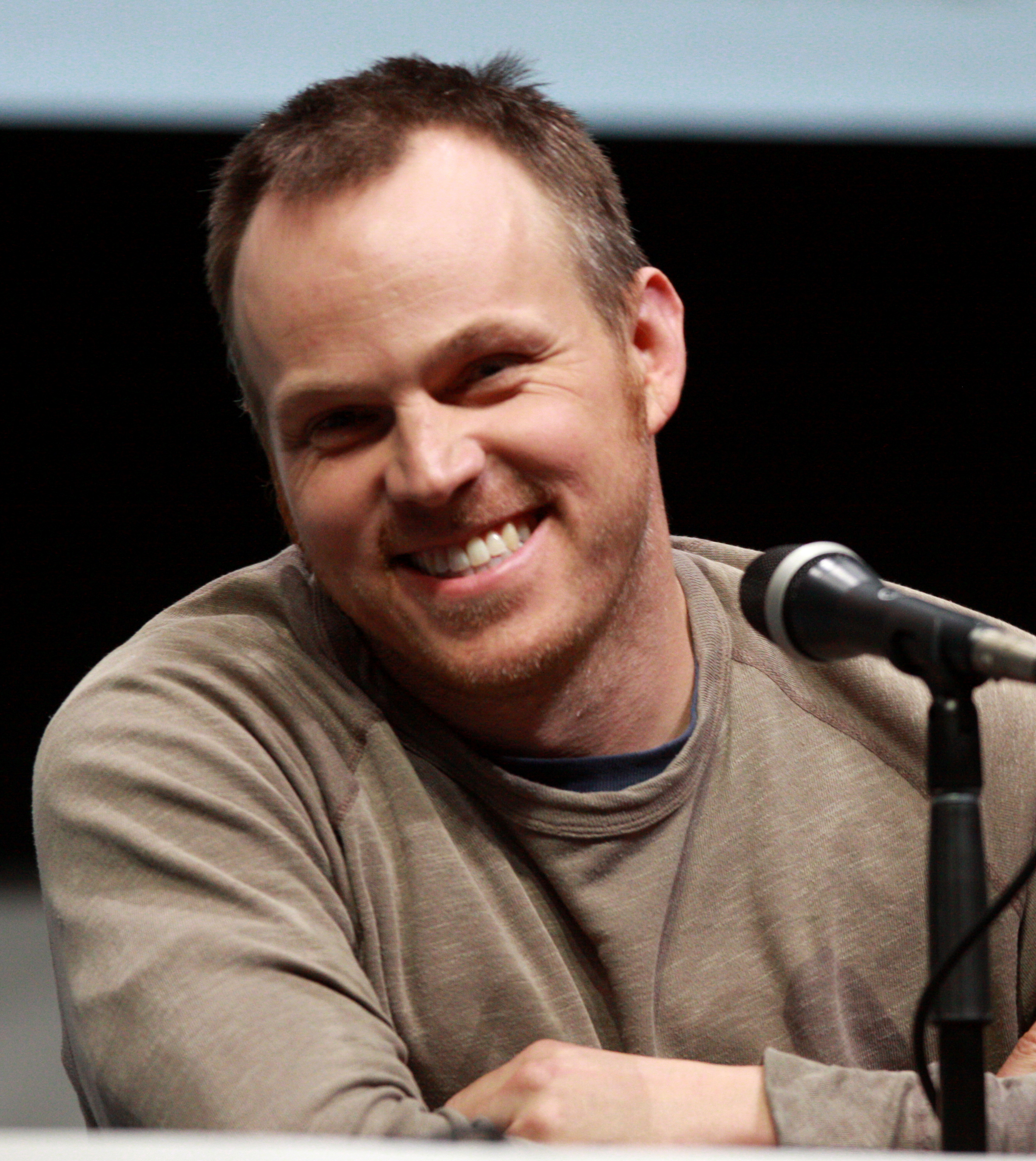
Marc Webb (pictured in 2013) directed all of Three Cheers' music videos.

Three singles were released from the album, starting with "I'm Not Okay (I Promise)" as the lead single on September 28, 2004. The song reached number 86 on the Billboard Hot 100, and has been certified 3× Platinum by the Recording Industry Association of America (RIAA). It has been considered My Chemical Romance's breakout hit. The album's second single, "Helena", was released on March 8, 2005. It reached number 33 on the Hot 100, and significantly contributed to the album's success. It has been certified 4× Platinum by the RIAA. As of 2024, "Helena" is the band's second most successful single in the United States, behind "Welcome to the Black Parade" (2006). "The Ghost of You" was released as the album's third single on August 29, 2005. It reached 84 on the Hot 100, and has been certified platinum only once. Additionally, "Thank You for the Venom" was released as a promotional single in 2004.

All three of the singles were accompanied by music videos directed by Marc Webb. "I'm Not Okay (I Promise)" received two music videos, with the first one being a collage of concert footage and pictures of the Way brothers as children. The second clip, directed by Webb, promoted the single release, and takes place in a high school and cuts between footage of the band members being bullied by school jocks and them performing the song. The music video for "Helena" takes place at the funeral for a young girl, going between shots of the band performing and the funeral attendees engaging in a dance number. "The Ghost of You" clip is set during World War II, and goes between shots of the band performing the song at a United Service Organizations dance event and them participating in D-Day. It is one of the most-expensive music videos ever made.

=== Artwork and aesthetic ===
The album's cover art, officially titled "Demolition Lovers II", was designed by Way. It was inspired by René Magritte's painting The Lovers. Originally, the artwork was created as a reference sketch for a photographer, but it became the artwork for the record after the record label saw it and requested to use it for the cover. During the promotional phase of the album, My Chemical Romance adopted a black-and-red aesthetic. In photo shoots and live performances, they would typically appear in attire consisting of black suits, red ties, red or white button-downs, and bulletproof vests.

== Reception and legacy ==
Professional ratings
Review scores
| Source | Rating |
|---|---|
| AllMusic | 4/5 stars |
| Alternative Press | 4.5/5 stars |
| Blender | 3/5 stars |
| IGN | 7.1/10 |
| Kludge | 7/10 |
| Melodic | 4/5 stars |
| Pitchfork | 8.2/10 |
| Rolling Stone | 3/5 stars |
| The Rolling Stone Album Guide | 3.5/5 stars |
| Stylus Magazine | B |

Johnny Loftus of AllMusic wrote that "with the aid of production major-leaguer Howard Benson, they've edited the slight rookie excesses of I Brought You My Bullets You Brought Me Your Love, resulting in a rewarding, pretty damn relentless product." Andy Greenwald of Blender noted Way's integration of elements of his life into the songs on the album and remarked that his "gulping, gasping whine turns stompers like 'I'm Not Okay (I Promise)' into after-school poetry". Ian Mathers of Stylus Magazine felt that the album contained "twelve near-flawless songs and an interlude in thirty-nine minutes" and that "even when it lets up, [it] doesn't let up", while Kirk Miller of Rolling Stone described it as "a hell of a good time." IGN critic JR was more reserved in his praise, calling Three Cheers for Sweet Revenge "a good album" that nonetheless "isn't nearly as varied or daring as it could have been". In The Village Voice, Robert Christgau gave it a "dud" rating.

Em Casalena of American Songwriter wrote that the album is "a golden record in emo rock history." NME listed the album as one of "20 Emo Albums That Have Resolutely Stood the Test of Time". The album was ranked at number 260 on Spin's "The 300 Best Albums of the Past 30 Years (1985–2014)" list. Rock Sound wrote that the album is "an era-defining release", striking "a nerve both musically and emotionally with millions around the world." Andrew Sacher of BrooklynVegan noted that the album's tracks "are so embedded in the DNA of pop culture that even non-MCR-fans tend to know every word."

In 2016, Rolling Stone declared Three Cheers for Sweet Revenge the tenth greatest emo album out of 40, saying that "Three Cheers wasn't just a concept record, it was a concept sequel, expanding the small-screen story of 2002's I Brought You My Bullets, You Brought Me Your Love into a big-budget production, complete with ruminations on life and death ("Helena") biting kiss-offs ("I'm Not Okay") and a series of dramatic music videos that made them MTV darlings."

Three Cheers for Sweet Revenge has sold over three million units in the United States and has been certified 3× platinum by the RIAA as of December 2017. It has also been certified quadruple platinum in Canada, double platinum in the United Kingdom, platinum in New Zealand, and gold in Argentina, Australia, Chile, Germany, Ireland, and Mexico. By November 2006, the album had sold over two million copies worldwide.

=== Accolades ===
| Publication | Country | Accolade | Year | Rank |
|---|---|---|---|---|
| Rock Sound | UK | Top 50 Albums of the Year | 2004 | 5 |
| Spin | US | The 40 Best Albums of 2004 | 2004 | 34 |
| Kerrang! | UK | Albums of the Year | 2004 | 3 |
| Metal Hammer | UK | Albums of 2004 | 2004 | 7 |

== Deluxe edition reissue ==
In April 2025, My Chemical Romance announced a deluxe edition reissue of Revenge, which was released on June 6, 2025, in honor of the album's twenty-first anniversary. Costey returned to lead the project, with assistance from Ray Toro.

The deluxe edition features remixed and remastered versions of all songs from the album. In addition, live recordings of "I'm Not Okay (I Promise)", "Helena", "The Ghost of You", and "You Know What They Do to Guys Like Us in Prison" were included; all except for the last one were previously unreleased. The original album's "Demolition Lovers" themed artwork and aesthetic was dropped for the reissue, instead featuring artwork that depicts a rosary. The release was issued digitally and physically on CD and vinyl, with over eight differently-colored variants of the latter being issued.

In the lead-up to the release, 4K remastered versions of the album's music videos were released. The live recording of "I'm Not Okay (I Promise)" was also published on streaming services in April. The reissue charted at number 6 on the Billboard 200, a jump from the number 28 spot that the album achieved on its original release, and also topped Billboard's Vinyl Albums, Top Rock & Alternative Albums, Top Rock Albums, Top Alternative Albums, and Catalog Albums charts. It also reached number 9 on the UK Albums chart, a jump from the original release position of 34.

== Track listing ==
Standard edition

All tracks are written by Frank Iero, Matt Pelissier, Ray Toro, Gerard Way, and Mikey Way.

| No. | Title | Length |
|---|---|---|
| 1. | "Helena" | 3:22 |
| 2. | "Give 'Em Hell, Kid" | 2:18 |
| 3. | "To the End" | 3:01 |
| 4. | "You Know What They Do to Guys Like Us in Prison" (featuring Bert McCracken of the Used) | 2:53 |
| 5. | "I'm Not Okay (I Promise)" | 3:08 |
| 6. | "The Ghost of You" | 3:22 |
| 7. | "The Jetset Life Is Gonna Kill You" | 3:37 |
| 8. | "Interlude" | 0:57 |
| 9. | "Thank You for the Venom" | 3:41 |
| 10. | "Hang 'Em High" | 2:47 |
| 11. | "It's Not a Fashion Statement, It's a Fucking Deathwish (Note: Alternatively titled without the fucking, as "It's Not a Fashion Statement, It's a Deathwish".)" | 3:30 |
| 12. | "Cemetery Drive" | 3:08 |
| 13. | "I Never Told You What I Do for a Living" | 3:51 |
| Total length: | | 39:36 |

Japanese edition bonus track
| No. | Title | Length |
|---|---|---|
| 14. | "Bury Me in Black" (demo) | 2:37 |
| Total length: | | 42:13 |

Japanese special edition DVD

Live from Summer Sonic 2004 in Tokyo on August 8, 2004
| No. | Title | Length |
|---|---|---|
| 1. | "I'm Not Okay (I Promise)" (music video version 2) | 3:29 |
| 2. | "I'm Not Okay (I Promise)" (music video version 1) | 3:33 |
| 3. | "Thank You for the Venom" (live) | 4:38 |
| 4. | "Helena" (live) | 3:38 |
| 5. | "Give 'Em Hell, Kid" (live) | 2:34 |
| 6. | "The Ghost of You" (live) | 3:48 |
| 7. | "You Know What They Do to Guys Like Us in Prison" (live) | 3:15 |
| 8. | "I'm Not Okay (I Promise)" (live) | 3:11 |
| Total length: | | 28:06 |

Deluxe edition bonus tracks

Live for BBC Radio 1's "The Lock Up", 2005
| No. | Title | Length |
|---|---|---|
| 14. | "I'm Not Okay (I Promise)" | 3:19 |
| 15. | "Helena" | 3:21 |
| 16. | "The Ghost Of You" | 3:26 |
| 17. | "You Know What They Do to Guys Like Us in Prison" | 3:25 |
| Total length: | | 53:14 |

== Personnel ==
My Chemical Romance

- Gerard Way – lead and backing vocals
- Ray Toro – lead guitar, backing vocals
- Frank Iero – rhythm guitar, backing vocals
- Mikey Way – bass guitar
- Matt Pelissier – drums, percussion
- Bob Bryar – drums, percussion (deluxe edition bonus tracks)

Additional musicians

- Bert McCracken – additional vocals on "You Know What They Do to Guys Like Us in Prison"
- Rinat Arinos – additional vocals on "The Ghost of You"
- Keith Morris – additional vocals on "Hang 'Em High"
- Howard Benson – 1958 Hammond B3

Production

- Howard Benson – producer, mixing (all except "Helena" and "Give 'Em Hell, Kid", "I'm Not Okay (I Promise)" and "The Ghost of You")
- Rich Costey – mixing on "Helena" and "Give 'Em Hell, Kid", "I'm Not Okay (I Promise)" and "The Ghost of You"
- Mike Plotnikoff – recording, editing
- Eric J. Miller – additional engineering
- Paul Decarli – Pro Tools and programming
- Jon Nicholson – drum tech
- Keith Nelson – guitar tech
- Tom Baker – mastering
- Matt Griffen – production coordinator
- Dana Childs – production coordinator
- Mark Holley – design assistance

== Charts ==
=== Weekly charts ===
2004–2006 weekly chart performance for Three Cheers for Sweet Revenge
| Chart (2004–2006) | Peak position |
|---|---|
| Argentine Albums (CAPIF) | 10 |
| Australian Albums (ARIA) | 38 |
| Austrian Albums (Ö3 Austria) | 73 |
| Canadian Albums (Nielsen SoundScan) | 20 |
| German Albums (Offizielle Top 100) | 57 |
| Irish Albums (IRMA) | 36 |
| Japanese Albums (Oricon) | 73 |
| Mexican Albums (Top 100 Mexico) | 19 |
| New Zealand Albums (RMNZ) | 30 |
| Scottish Albums (Official Charts) | 46 |
| Singaporean Albums (RIAS) | 9 |
| UK Albums (Official Charts) | 34 |
| UK Rock & Metal Albums (Official Charts) | 1 |
| US Billboard 200 | 28 |
| US Top Rock Albums (Billboard) | 14 |

2015 weekly chart performance for Three Cheers for Sweet Revenge
| Chart (2015) | Peak position |
|---|---|
| US Top Tastemaker Albums (Billboard) | 23 |

2018 weekly chart performance for Three Cheers for Sweet Revenge
| Chart (2018) | Peak position |
|---|---|
| Czech Albums (ČNS IFPI) | 83 |

2020–2022 weekly chart performance for Three Cheers for Sweet Revenge
| Chart (2020–2022) | Peak position |
|---|---|
| Greek Albums (IFPI) | 20 |
| Portuguese Albums (AFP) | 8 |
| US Top Alternative Albums (Billboard) | 6 |
| US Top Tastemaker Albums (Billboard) | 19 |

2025 weekly chart performance for Three Cheers for Sweet Revenge
| Chart (2025) | Peak position |
|---|---|
| Argentine Albums (CAPIF) | 7 |
| Australian Albums (ARIA) | 16 |
| Austrian Albums (Ö3 Austria) | 54 |
| Belgian Albums (Ultratop Flanders) | 183 |
| Belgian Albums (Ultratop Wallonia) | 181 |
| Canadian Albums (Billboard) | 25 |
| Croatian International Albums (HDU) | 5 |
| Dutch Vinyl Albums (Vinyl 33) | 16 |
| German Albums (Offizielle Top 100) | 20 |
| German Rock/Metal Albums (GfK) | 8 |
| Hungarian Albums (MAHASZ) | 13 |
| Polish Albums (ZPAV) | 89 |
| Scottish Albums (Official Charts) | 4 |
| Spanish Vinyl Albums (Promusicae) | 25 |
| UK Albums (Official Charts) | 9 |
| UK Rock & Metal Albums (Official Charts) | 1 |
| US Billboard 200 | 6 |
| US Indie Store Album Sales (Billboard) | 2 |
| US Top Rock & Alternative Albums (Billboard) | 1 |

=== Year-end charts ===
2005 year-end chart performance for Three Cheers for Sweet Revenge
| Chart (2005) | Position |
|---|---|
| Mexican Albums (Top 100 Mexico) | 57 |
| UK Albums (OCC) | 116 |
| US Billboard 200 | 58 |

2021 year-end chart performance for Three Cheers for Sweet Revenge
| Chart (2021) | Position |
|---|---|
| Portuguese Albums (AFP) | 98 |
| US Top Alternative Albums (Billboard) | 27 |
| US Top Rock Albums (Billboard) | 51 |

2022 year-end chart performance for Three Cheers for Sweet Revenge
| Chart (2022) | Position |
|---|---|
| US Top Rock & Alternative Albums (Billboard) | 83 |

2024 year-end chart performance for Three Cheers for Sweet Revenge
| Chart (2024) | Position |
|---|---|
| US Top Rock & Alternative Albums (Billboard) | 80 |

2025 year-end chart performance for Three Cheers for Sweet Revenge
| Chart (2025) | Position |
|---|---|
| Croatian International Albums (HDU) | 31 |
| US Top Rock & Alternative Albums (Billboard) | 72 |

== Certifications ==
Certifications and sales for Three Cheers for Sweet Revenge
| Region | Certification | Certified units/sales |
|---|---|---|
| Argentina (CAPIF) | Gold | 20,000^{^} |
| Australia (ARIA) | Gold | 35,000^{^} |
| Canada (Music Canada) | 4× Platinum | 400,000^{‡} |
| Chile | Gold | 7,500 |
| Germany (BVMI) | Gold | 100,000^{‡} |
| Ireland (IRMA) | Gold | 7,500^{^} |
| Mexico (AMPROFON) | Gold | 50,000^{^} |
| New Zealand (RMNZ) | Platinum | 15,000^{‡} |
| United Kingdom (BPI) | 2× Platinum | 600,000^{‡} |
| United States (RIAA) | 3× Platinum | 3,000,000^{‡} |
^{^} Shipments figures based on certification alone.^{‡} Sales+streaming figures based on certification alone.
