= List of My Chemical Romance members =

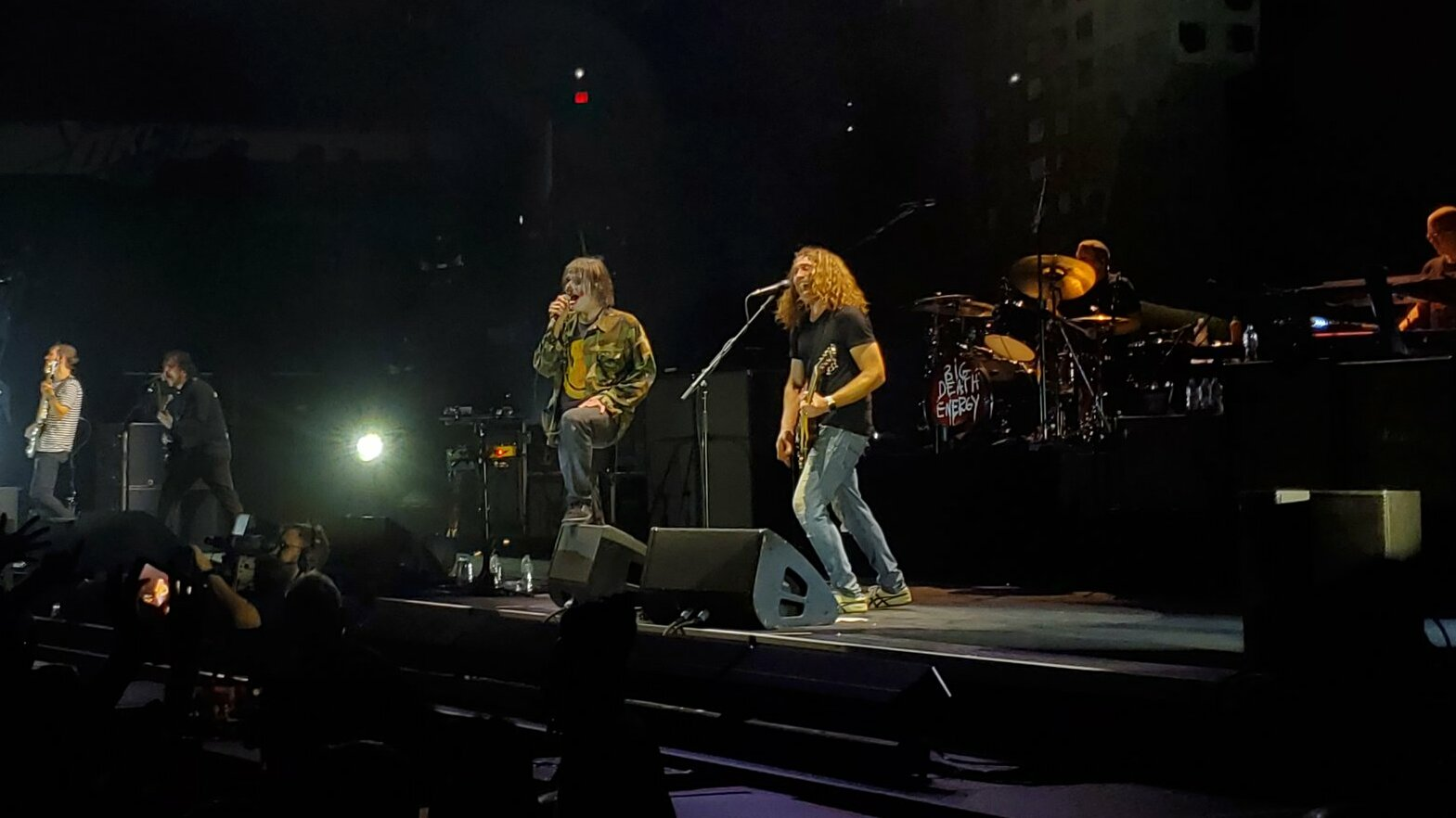
My Chemical Romance performing in Oklahoma City in 2022 during their reunion tour.

My Chemical Romance is an American rock band from New Jersey. It was formed in 2001 by vocalist Gerard Way, with drummer Matt Pelissier, guitarist Ray Toro, and bassist Mikey Way joining shortly after. Guitarist Frank Iero joined by the time they released their debut studio album, I Brought You My Bullets, You Brought Me Your Love, in 2002. The band's current lineup consists of Gerard and Mikey Way, Toro, and Iero. Alongside the main lineup, the band has had several touring musicians throughout its history. Among these are drummer Jarrod Alexander and keyboardist Jamie Muhoberac, who have played with the band since their reunion, including on their most recent studio release, "The Foundations of Decay" (2022).

== History ==
My Chemical Romance was formed by Gerard Way in 2001. Drummer Matt Pelissier joined one week after the band was formed. Guitarist Ray Toro and bassist Mikey Way, the latter of whom is Gerard's brother, followed not long after. In 2002, the band met and was joined by guitarist Frank Iero. The band went on to release their debut studio album, I Brought You My Bullets, You Brought Me Your Love, that year. Due to time constraints, Iero was only able to contribute to two songs on the record. In 2004, the band released their second studio album, Three Cheers for Sweet Revenge.

In 2004, My Chemical Romance kicked Pelissier out of the band while touring for Revenge. Shortly after, he was replaced by Bob Bryar, who appeared on the music videos for Revenge despite not playing on the album. He went on to appear on Life on the Murder Scene (2006) and the band's third studio album, The Black Parade (2006), where he received co-writing credits for all songs on the album. James Dewees joined the band at this time as their tourist keyboardist. While the band was touring to promote the album, several members of the band were temporarily replaced due to injuries or illness. In January 2007, Iero temporarily left the tour because of an unspecified illness, being replaced by Drive By guitarist Todd Price. Mikey Way took time off to get married and spend time with his new wife, Alicia Simmons, and was replaced by guitar tech Matt Cortez from April to October 4. Bryar was replaced with Saves the Day’s Pete Parada or Thursday’s Tucker Rule on certain dates. Bryar returned to drumming by January 2008.

Bryar parted ways with My Chemical Romance in early 2010. According to biographer Tom Bryant, he was kicked out of the band. The band released their fourth studio album Danger Days: The True Lives of the Fabulous Killjoys in 2010. While Bryar is credited as a songwriter on five songs, he did not perform on any of it. Most of the album featured John Miceli on drums, with Dorian Crozier performing on "Bulletproof Heart". Mike Pedicone performed on the extended play, The Mad Gear and Missile Kid (2010); the band initially wanted him to take the role of their touring drummer, though he was removed by September 2011 and replaced by Jarrod Alexander. In 2012, the band began work on their fifth studio album, The Paper Kingdom, which was never released. Dewees joined the band officially and contributed to the writing sessions, while Alexander was set to play on it. From 2012 to 2013, the band released Conventional Weapons, a compilation album consisting of ten unreleased songs that were recorded in 2009. These songs feature Bryar as a songwriter and performer, as they were recorded prior to his departure.

My Chemical Romance broke up in March 2013. One of the songs that was intended to be part of The Paper Kingdom, "Fake Your Death", was later included in the band's greatest hits album May Death Never Stop You (2014). My Chemical Romance reunited in 2019, with the Way brothers, Iero, and Toro all returning. For their Reunion Tour, they were joined by Alexander and Jamie Muhoberac as their touring drummer and keyboardist, respectively. Muhoberac previously served as a session musician for The Black Parade and Danger Days. The two later performed on the band's first single since their reunion, "The Foundations of Decay". In 2025, the band embarked on their Long Live The Black Parade tour. Alongside Alexander and Muhoberac, the band was joined by violinist Kayleigh Goldsworthy and cellist Clarice Jensen, the latter of whom played a solo in-between the band's sets. Rule also returned, playing percussion.

== Members ==
=== Current ===
| Image | Name | Years active | Instruments | Release contributions (Note: In this list, major releases mainly refers to My Chemical Romance's studio albums. Other significant releases to this specific line-up, such as specific songs, are included if a full album was not released in the given time-span or are otherwise important.) |
|---|---|---|---|---|
| | Gerard Way | 2001–2013; 2019–present | lead vocals; synthesizer | All My Chemical Romance releases |
| | Ray Toro | 2001–2013; 2019–present | lead guitar; backing vocals | All My Chemical Romance releases |
| | Mikey Way | 2001–2013; 2019–present | bass guitar | All My Chemical Romance releases |
| | Frank Iero | 2002–2013; 2019–present | rhythm guitar; backing vocals | Two songs on I Brought You My Bullets, You Brought Me Your Love (2002); All releases starting with and following Three Cheers for Sweet Revenge (2004) |

=== Former ===
| Image | Name | Years active | Instruments | Release contributions |
|---|---|---|---|---|
| | Matt Pelissier | 2001–2004 | drums; percussion | I Brought You My Bullets, You Brought Me Your Love (2002); Three Cheers for Sweet Revenge (2004) |
| | Bob Bryar | 2004–2010 (died 2024) | drums; percussion | The Black Parade (2006); Conventional Weapons (2013) |
| | James Dewees | 2007–2012 (touring); 2012–2013 | keyboards; synthesizer; percussion; backing vocals | "Fake Your Death" (2014) |

=== Touring ===
| Image | Name | Years active | Instruments | Release contributions |
|---|---|---|---|---|
| | Jarrod Alexander | 2011–2013; 2019–present | drums; percussion | "Fake Your Death" (2014); "The Foundations of Decay" (2022) |
| | Jamie Muhoberac | 2006 (additional studio musician); 2010 (additional studio musician); 2019–present (touring) | keyboards; synthesizer | The Black Parade (2006); Danger Days: The True Lives of the Fabulous Killjoys (2010); "The Foundations of Decay" (2022) |
| | Todd Price | 2007; (substitute for Frank Iero) | rhythm guitar | None |
| | Matt Cortez | 2007; (substitute for Mikey Way) | bass | None |
| | Pete Parada | 2007–2008; (substitute for Bob Bryar) | drums; percussion | None |
| | Tucker Rule | 2007–2008 (substitute for Bob Bryar); 2025-present | drums; percussion | None |
| | Mike Pedicone | 2010-2011 | drums; percussion | The Mad Gear and Missile Kid (2010) |
| | Kayleigh Goldsworthy | 2025-present | violin; backing vocals | None |
| | Clarice Jensen | 2025-present | cello | None |

=== Session musicians ===
| Image | Name | Years active | Instruments | Release contributions |
|---|---|---|---|---|
| | John Miceli | 2010 | drums; percussion | Performing on most of Danger Days: The True Lives of the Fabulous Killjoys (2010) |
| | Dorian Crozier | 2010 | drums; percussion | Performing on "Bulletproof Heart" from Danger Days: The True Lives of the Fabulous Killjoys (2010) |

== Lineups ==
| Period | Members (Note: Excludes touring musicians.) | Studio releases |
|---|---|---|
| 2001–2004 (Line-up by Bullets) (Note: While the band started with only Gerard Way and the other members joined over the course of several months, this list uses their line-up by their first album for simplicity.) | Gerard Way – lead vocals; Ray Toro – lead guitar, backing vocals; Frank Iero – rhythm guitar, backing vocals; Mikey Way – bass; Matt Pelissier – drums, percussion | I Brought You My Bullets, You Brought Me Your Love (2002); Three Cheers for Sweet Revenge (2004) |
| 2004–2010 | Gerard Way – lead vocals; Ray Toro – lead guitar, backing vocals; Frank Iero – rhythm guitar, backing vocals; Mikey Way – bass; Bob Bryar – drums, percussion | The Black Parade (2006); Conventional Weapons (2012–2013) |
| 2010–2012 | Gerard Way – lead vocals; Ray Toro – lead guitar, backing vocals; Frank Iero – rhythm guitar, backing vocals; Mikey Way – bass | Danger Days: The True Lives of the Fabulous Killjoys (2010) |
| 2012–2013 | Gerard Way – lead vocals; Ray Toro – lead guitar, backing vocals; Frank Iero – rhythm guitar, backing vocals; Mikey Way – bass; James Dewees – keyboard, percussion, backing vocals | "Fake Your Death" (2014) |
Temporary breakup (March 2013 – October 2019)
| 2019–present | Gerard Way – lead vocals, synthesizer; Ray Toro – lead guitar, backing vocals; Frank Iero – rhythm guitar, backing vocals; Mikey Way – bass | "The Foundations of Decay" (2022) |

== Timeline ==
Main band timeline

Touring musicians timeline
