= Disenchanted (My Chemical Romance song) =

2006 song by My Chemical Romance

Song by My Chemical Romance

from the album The Black Parade
- Released: October 23, 2006
- Recorded: 2006
- Genre: Emo
- Length: 4:55
- Label: Reprise
- Songwriters: Bob Bryar; Frank Iero; Ray Toro; Gerard Way; Mikey Way
- Producers: Rob Cavallo; My Chemical Romance

Audio
- "Disenchanted" on YouTube

"Disenchanted" is a song by the American rock band My Chemical Romance from their third studio album The Black Parade (2006). An emo power ballad that is almost five minutes long, the song is centered around the album's central figure, the Patient, as he nears the end of his life and reflects on his past. It was among the first songs to be written for the album, and an earlier version of the song titled "Shut Up and Play" was performed throughout the band's tour for Three Cheers for Sweet Revenge (2004).

The song was almost cut from The Black Parade, but bassist Mikey Way advocated for its inclusion in the final album. The song has been met with mixed responses from critics, with some viewing it as well-written, and others considering the song to be forgettable. Following the Black Parade World Tour, the band didn't play "Disenchanted" for over seventeen years before playing it at the When We Were Young festival in 2024; in a 2011 interview, they labeled "Disenchanted" as their least favorite song to play live. In 2025, the song was certified gold by the Recording Industry Association of America (RIAA) and charted in Malaysia.

== Background and release ==
While touring for their second studio album, Three Cheers for Sweet Revenge (2004), My Chemical Romance wrote and recorded demos for several songs in their tour bus's makeshift studio. Gerard Way referred to these demo recordings as "Revenge part two", a side project the band initially had no plans of releasing. Among these demo recordings was an early version of "Disenchanted", originally titled "Shut Up and Play". The song was worked on as the tour continued, being played during soundchecks for their concerts.

In early 2006, the band went to S.I.R. Studios in New York City to begin writing their next studio album, The Black Parade (2006). During this time, the band went through their bus demos and began finishing work on them. "Disenchanted", in particular, would receive a complete lyrical overhaul over the next few months. The song was almost cut from the track list of The Black Parade, but bassist Mikey Way advocated for its inclusion on the final record. The song, alongside the rest of the album, was produced by Rob Cavallo and collectively written by all members of the band.

The Black Parade was released on October 23, 2006, via Reprise Records; "Disenchanted" is the twelfth song in the standard tracklist. It was later included on the 2008 live album and DVD The Black Parade is Dead!, which featured a recording of the final show of the Black Parade World Tour where the band played the album in full. The song was included as part of The Black Parade/Living with Ghosts, a 10th anniversary reissue of The Black Parade, alongside a live demo of the song. In 2025, "Disenchanted" was certified gold by the Recording Industry Association of America (RIAA). That same year, the song reached number 23 on the Billboard Malaysia Songs chart.

== Music and lyrics ==
"Disenchanted" is an emo power ballad that is four minutes and fifty-five seconds long. The song starts with an acoustic guitar, an instrument that the band hadn't dominantly used in any prior songs. Towards the end of the song as the main instruments of the song—including additional guitars and drums—fade away, the acoustic medley returns as the song concludes. Andrew Blackie of PopMatters described "Disenchanted" as anthemic and compared it to songs present on the Jimmy Eat World album Bleed American (2001). Christopher R. Weingarten and Aliza Aufrichtig of the New York Times likened it to "Supersonic" by Oasis and "Chemical World" by Blur.

Lyrically, the song revolves around the Patient as he reflects upon his life as he nears his death. The predominant theme of the song is nostalgia, with the Patient noting that while his life started off alright, it would amount to nothing more than a "lifelong wait for a hospital stay". Eli Enis of Paste described the song as "suspiciously uplifting" in style, despite its emotional tone.

== Critical reception ==
Reactions towards "Disenchanted" have been mixed, with some believing it to be a memorable, well-written power ballad, and others believing it to forgettable. In a 2023 readers poll for Alternative Press, "Disenchanted" was voted as the third best song by My Chemical Romance. The magazine's Alessandra Schade described the song as overlooked in comparison to other ballads from The Black Parade, though still stood out from the rest of the album. She said that the tone of the songs lyrics were some that the band had written, describing it as a "truly masterful power-ballad that ruminates on the futility of life." In 2024, another readers poll from the same magazine ranked the song as the second best from The Black Parade, behind "Sleep". Enis wrote that the song's lyrics were "some of the most tragic subject matters" on The Black Parade, serving as a "gut-punching reminder of our inescapable morality" as well as a "right-hook to the rockstar facade." He described the song as of My Chemical Romance's "most poignant artistic statements". Louder's Marianne Eloise described the song as a "Queen-like" effort, and said that the band wrote ballads like nobody else.

Ariana Bacle of Entertainment Weekly felt that the song wasn't "worth writing home about on its own", but viewed it as a nice "calm before the storm" song as the final track in the album before "Famous Last Words", as well as a break from the rest of the album's energetic songs. Writing in a retrospective ranking of My Chemical Romance's discography for Loudwire, Cassie Whitt described "Disenchanted" as one of the worst songs created by the band. In a play on the song's title, Whitt felt that the song delivered a "disenchanted message to anyone trying to make the band anything other than what they wanted to be" during the band's rise in popularity. Another editor for Alternative Press, Mackenzie Templeton, felt that while the songs lyrics and their delivery were able to pull the listener in, it was not as unique as other songs from The Black Parade. In retrospective rankings of the band's discography, Eloise ranked "Disenchanted" as the band's 14th best song, and Chloe Spinks of Gigwise ranked it at 38th.

== Live performances ==
Due to the song being performed during the band's promotional tours for Three Cheers for Sweet Revenge, "Disenchanted" was the first song from The Black Parade to ever be performed live. It was later included in the set lists for the Black Parade World Tour (2007–2008), where My Chemical Romance would perform The Black Parade in its entirety. By the end of 2007, the band stopped playing "Disenchanted" live, and wouldn't play it again for seventeen years. In a 2011 live stream with fan-submitted questions, the band expressed their dislike towards the song, saying that it had become their least-favorite to play live. In 2024, the band played the song at that year's When We Were Young festival, once again as part of The Black Parade in its entirety. It was later played during the band's Long Live The Black Parade tour (2025–2026), where it was also part of the album being played in full.

== Personnel ==
Credits adapted from the digital liner notes.

Musicians

- Gerard Way – vocals, songwriter, producer
- Frank Iero – guitar, background vocals, songwriter, producer
- Michael James Way – bass, songwriter, producer
- Raymond Toro – guitar (lead and acoustic), songwriter, producer
- Bob Bryar – drums, percussion, songwriter, producer
- Jamie Muhoberac – synthesizer

Technicals

- Rob Cavallo – producer
- Doug McKean – engineer
- David Campbell – string arranger, string arranger
- Keith Armstrong – assistant engineer
- Jon Herroon – assistant engineer
- Jimmy Hoyson – assistant engineer
- Chris Steffen – assistant engineer
- Lars Fox – editing engineer
- Ted Jenson – mastering engineer
- Chris Lord-Alge – mixing engineer

== Charts ==
Chart performance for "Disenchanted"
Chart (2025)	Peak position
Malaysia (Billboard)	23
Malaysia International (RIM)	19

== Certifications ==
Certifications for "Disenchanted"
Region	Certification	Certified units/sales
United States (RIAA)	Gold	500,000^{‡}
^{‡} Sales+streaming figures based on certification alone.
