= The Paper Kingdom =

Unreleased studio album by My Chemical Romance

Studio album (unfinished) by My Chemical Romance
- Released: N/A; Leaked on February 1, 2026
- Recorded: 2012
- Genre: Alternative rock
- Producer: Doug McKean

My Chemical Romance chronology
Danger Days: The True Lives of the Fabulous Killjoys (2010)	The Paper Kingdom (N/A)	Conventional Weapons (2012–2013)

The Paper Kingdom (also referred to as MCR5) is an unreleased studio album by the American rock band My Chemical Romance. Intended to be the band's fifth record, recording began in 2012, with Doug McKean producing the album. Described by people present during the writing sessions as alternative rock and gothic-sounding, it would've been a concept album following a story about a support group of parents whose children had died.

The album's writing was highly impacted by the mental health of the band members. Gerard Way, despite his depression and lack of motivation, pushed himself to write music anyway, leading to the creation of the support group story. Other band members were unsatisfied with the album's direction. In March 2013, My Chemical Romance announced their break up, and The Paper Kingdom was scrapped.

One song from the album, "Fake Your Death", was included on their greatest hits album May Death Never Stop You (2014). Another song, "War Beneath the Rain", was played live in 2025 after the band's reunion. According to guitarist Frank Iero, most of the album was unsalvageable. It was later subject to rampant speculation throughout My Chemical Romance's fandom, with fans believing that the band was hinting towards its release. An incomplete version of the record was leaked online on February 1, 2026.

== Overview and music ==
The Paper Kingdom was going to be a concept album, telling the story of a support group of parents whose children had died, and would make up a narrative about how their children were actually lost in the woods fighting against a witch. The style of music being written for the album was described by those present at its writing and recording sessions as the darkest music the band had ever written. Some described it as alternative rock and "gothic", drawing comparisons between the band's sound and Radiohead. One of the people present at the sessions was comic book artist Grant Morrison, who said that the music almost did not sound like My Chemical Romance at all.

Two songs have been confirmed by the band to have been made for the album: "Fake Your Death", which was officially released in 2014, and "War Beneath the Rain", which was performed live in 2025. However, internet leaks in the years after the album's cancellation suggest that it would've had either twelve or sixteen tracks; the unfinished workprint of the album leaked in 2026 contains sixteen tracks.

== Development ==
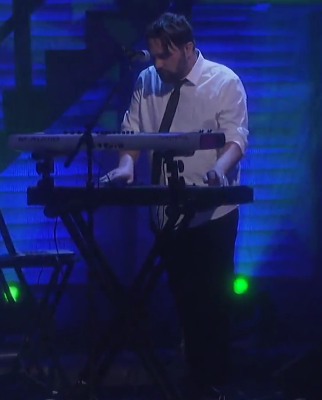
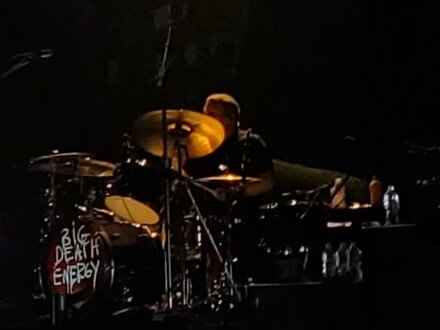
The Paper Kingdom was going to feature My Chemical Romance's touring musicians James Dewees (left, pictured in 2014) and Jarrod Alexander (right, pictured in 2022). Dewees assisted with writing the record and became an official member of the band by the end of the year.

After touring concluded for their previous album Danger Days: The True Lives of the Fabulous Killjoys, My Chemical Romance reconvened in early 2012 to begin work on their fifth studio album, with the working title of The Paper Kingdom. They rented out a space in Los Angeles to convert into their own recording studio. The band hoped that, with their own space, they could write new music whenever they wanted to rather than having to adhere to a strict recording deadline. Their touring keyboardist James Dewees was going to be included as part of the writing sessions for the album; he became an official member of the band shortly before their breakup. Furthermore, touring drummer Jarrod Alexander was set to perform on the record.

Recording sessions started in June 2012, with audio engineer Doug McKean helping with production. In an interview on Spoilers with Kevin Smith, front man Gerard Way stated that progress on the album was going "rather quickly" and described it as "very dark so far". In early 2013, Way told Kerrang! that six songs for the album were complete. When the band was not working on the music itself, they would instead work on designing costumes and stage sets related to it. These costumes were set to be designed by Colleen Atwood, who had previously done costume work with the band starting with The Black Parade (2006).

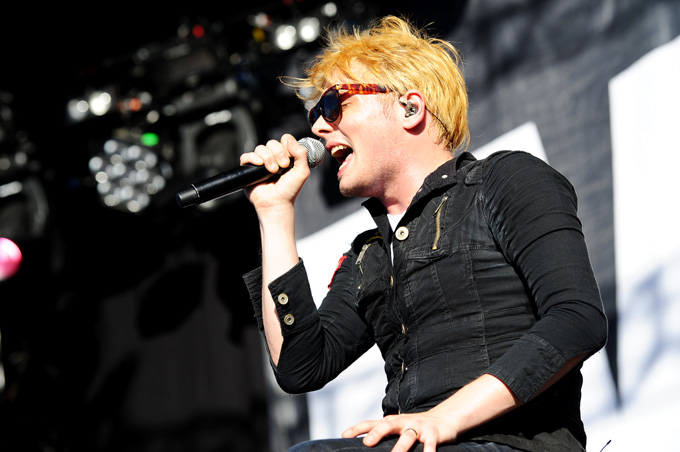
Gerard Way at the festival Big Day Out in February 2012 in Australia

The direction of the album was influenced by the mental health of the band members at the time, specifically Way. Despite his depressive state at the time and lack of motivation to create music—which he referred to as "the haze", he pushed himself to write anyways, leading to the creation of the support group story concept. In an interview, he said that it was "not a story I wanted to tell – and the songs reflected that, you could hear it. All the joy was just gone." Way was also driven by a desire to replicate the success of The Black Parade, as Danger Days was not as much of a cultural phenomenon. Way felt that, since fans already saw My Chemical Romance as a "super dark" band, he thought that the band's direction should reflect that, and that part of him was hoping that The Paper Kingdom would replicate The Black Parade's energy. Retrospectively, Way saw this as going against his values as an artist—to always move forward with unique ideas rather than try to replicate something else, a decision that he only made because of his deteriorating mental health. Guitarist Frank Iero described the making of the album as bleak, and the music itself as having a "weird sparseness to it". He said that even though over an hour of music had been conceptualized, most of it was unfinished. He also claimed that the band overall struggled with direction at the time, and was unable to make decisions on where to take the music.

On March 22, 2013, My Chemical Romance officially announced their break up. The Paper Kingdom was scrapped completely. In an interview with My Chemical Romance biographer Tom Bryant, Iero told him that nothing worthwhile had come out of the album's writing sessions, and that if anything positive had come out of it, the album likely would have been released and the band would not have broken up. "Fake Your Death" was included in the band's greatest hits album, May Death Never Stop You (2014), poised as the band's final song. It was released as a single from the compilation on February 17, 2014. According to Iero, it was the only song from The Paper Kingdom that was suitable for release, and that the rest of it was likely unsalvageable. In a 2014 interview, Way stated that he might revisit The Paper Kingdom's story in the future, though it could be through a different medium.

== Legacy ==
Some material published by the band, such as the logo used for the Long Live The Black Parade tour (pictured), was speculated by fans as alluding to The Paper Kingdom

My Chemical Romance reunited in 2019, and released "The Foundations of Decay" in 2022, their first new song since "Fake Your Death" and The Paper Kingdom's cancellation. The band hoped to make more music after "Foundations", including another attempt at a fifth record, but McKean's death in 2022 led to these plans being cancelled. The band played "Fake Your Death" live for the first time on October 17, 2022, during their Reunion Tour. "War Beneath the Rain" was debuted on July 26, 2025, during their Long Live The Black Parade tour (2025-2026). The performance was dedicated to the family of McKean.

The Paper Kingdom has also become the subject of speculation within the band's fandom, with multiple instances where fans have tried to connect promotional material to the record and speculating that the band was teasing the project's completion. Blunt Magazine described the album as "unreleased gem that’s become a thing of fan lore". Media that fans connected to The Paper Kingdom includes certain imagery from the band's initial reunion announcements, and a video that they released titled "An Offering...", which was speculated by some as being a possible song title. Similarly, when My Chemical Romance released a teaser in 2024, several people noticed that the initials for The Paper Kingdom, when translated into Russian and then rotated, roughly resembled the logo present within the teaser. The teaser ended up being for Long Live The Black Parade.

=== Leaks ===
In 2022, a user on an internet forum (under the username of "Excalibur") claimed to have the entirety of The Paper Kingdom and posted an offer allowing users to purchase the demos for $15,000. He claimed that the album featured twelve tracks, and posted three snippets of the songs "Dark Cloud", "Wake Up!", and "Witch". The snippets were taken down shortly afterwards for copyright, and only one user seemingly purchased the album before posts with any mentions of The Paper Kingdom were covered up. "Witch" was later posted online in full due to a dispute between leakers over alleged scamming.

On February 1, 2026, an unfinished workprint of the full album was leaked online by an unknown source. The leak contained sixteen tracks, thirteen of which were brand new; "Fake Your Death", "War Beneath the Rain", and "Witch" were already publicly available or leaked in some capacity. In the following days, several more demos were leaked: "Eggman", "Into Your Arms", "Stars Align", "Watching the World", and "Wednesday", all of which were claimed to be related to The Paper Kingdom. Multiple online communities dedicated to My Chemical Romance condemned users that listened to or discussed the leaks, questioning the ethics of listening to an album that the band did not want released. The subreddit r/MyChemicalRomance prohibited discussion of the leaks entirely.

== Track listing ==
The following track listing, and track lengths, are taken from the leaked workprint of the album in February 2026, as reported by Jason Tate. It is not an official track list, and only two of these tracks, "Fake Your Death" and "War Beneath the Rain", have been confirmed by the band themselves to be planned for the record.

No.	Title	Writer(s)	Additional sources and info	Length
1.	"Fake Your Death"	James Dewees, Frank Iero, Ray Toro, Gerard Way, Mikey Way	Confirmed, released in 2014	3:31
2.	"Witch"			5:30
3.	"Bike Thief"			5:02
4.	"Operation Day"			4:30
5.	"Falling Down"			3:00
6.	"Birthday Girl"			3:17
7.	"Dark Cloud"			6:10
8.	"Wake Up!"			3:12
9.	"Louder"			3:47
10.	"Narita Airport"			2:32
11.	"War Beneath the Rain"		Confirmed, performed in 2025	4:09
12.	"Paper Swords"			5:32
13.	"Dive"			5:29
14.	"High Hopes"			4:59
15.	"Dogs"			4:30
16.	"Perfectly Well"			2:15
