= The World Is Ugly / The Light Behind Your Eyes =

"The World Is Ugly" / "The Light Behind Your Eyes"
- "Number Three" single cover art

Single by My Chemical Romance

from the album Conventional Weapons
- Released: December 18, 2012
- Genre: Rock
- Length: 4:54 ("The World Is Ugly"); 5:12 ("The Light Behind Your Eyes")
- Label: Reprise
- Songwriters: Gerard Way; Ray Toro; Frank Iero; Mikey Way; Bob Bryar
- Producer: Brendan O'Brien

Audio
- "The World Is Ugly" on YouTube "The Light Behind Your Eyes" on YouTube

"The World Is Ugly" and "The Light Behind Your Eyes" are songs by the American rock band My Chemical Romance from their compilation album, Conventional Weapons (2013). Together, they were released as the third single from the compilation, "Number Three", on December 18, 2012. They were created in 2009 when the band first worked on Conventional Weapons and intended for it to be their fourth studio album, before scrapping the project in favor of Danger Days: The True Lives of the Fabulous Killjoys (2010).

Both songs are rock ballads; "The World Is Ugly" tells the listener to not let the world change who they are, while "The Light Behind Your Eyes" covers death and leaving a message for those who are still alive. Critical reception towards "The World Is Ugly" has been mixed, while "The Light Behind Your Eyes" has been reviewed more positively, with some critics considering it one of My Chemical Romance's best songs. The single topped the UK Rock & Metal chart and reached number 113 on the UK singles chart. "The World Is Ugly" has been performed during multiple of the band's concert tours, while "The Light Behind Your Eyes" made its live debut during the Long Live The Black Parade tour in 2026.

== Background and release ==
My Chemical Romance began work on Conventional Weapons, intending for it to be their fourth studio album, in 2009. Unlike their previous concept albums, the band wanted to create a "straight-ahead rock 'n' roll record" with no story or characters, and had songs that worked better within party settings. Writing for the album began in February, while production began in June. Recording took place at A&M Studios, while Brendan O'Brien served as the producer.

Among the songs written for the album were "The World Is Ugly" and "The Light Behind Your Eyes". The former was written and first performed by the band while they were touring for their third album, The Black Parade (2006), where it was met with a positive response by audiences. Gerard Way said that he wrote the song while in a hotel room in Seoul during the Black Parade World Tour. "The Light Behind Your Eyes" was conceived by singer Gerard Way as a song dedicated to his daughter. Way said he wanted the song to sound like "High Hopes" by Pink Floyd. Eventually, the band scrapped Conventional Weapons, and released Danger Days: The True Lives of the Fabulous Killjoys (2010) as their fourth album.

In late 2012, My Chemical Romance announced that they would be releasing ten songs from Conventional Weapons, two each month across five singles, from October 2012 to February 2013. The third single, officially titled "Number Three", was released on December 18, 2012, featuring "The World Is Ugly" as the main A-side track and "The Light Behind Your Eyes" as the B-side. The single topped the UK Rock & Metal chart and reached number 113 on the UK singles chart. "The World Is Ugly" was first performed live in 2008, a year before it was recorded, and has also been performed during the band's 2019-2023 reunion tour, and the 2025-2026 Long Live The Black Parade tour, while "The Light Behind Your Eyes" made its live debut at Chase Field in Phoenix, Arizona, on September 6, 2026, during the Long Live The Black Parade tour.

== Music ==
Both "The World Is Ugly" and "The Light Behind Your Eyes" are rock ballads. "The World Is Ugly" tells the listener that to not let the world change them or "take [their] heart". The core lyric of the song is "The World Is Ugly / But you're beautiful to me". The vocals at the end of the song utilizes a vocoder, and references one of the band's earliest songs, "Vampires Will Never Hurt You" (2002).

Meanwhile, "The Light Behind Your Eyes" covers the inevitability of death and saying goodbye to loved ones, while leaving behind a message to the ones that are still alive. The track is led by violins and an acoustic guitar, before introducing electric guitars later into its runtime. Marianne Eloise of Louder described it as a "rumination on mortality, life, and their time as a band before fading away". Raul Stanciu of Sputnikmusic likened the song to a lullaby.

== Critical reception ==
Reception towards "The World Is Ugly" was mixed. Chloe Spinks of Gigwise felt that the song's message was better achieved by its B-side, and the core lyric was a "slightly vapid backwards compliment that is hard to get behind". She also believed it was a moment that exemplified how Conventional Weapons was, fundamentally, a series of demos. Cassie Whitt and Jake Richardson of Loudwire compared the song to others by the band with similar messaging, described it as "one of the strongest representations of that sentiment".

Conversely, reception towards "The Light Behind Your Eyes" was generally positive. Stanciu described "The Light Behind Your Eyes" as having a "beautiful acoustic rhythm with nostalgic slide leads" and labeled it as My Chemical Romance's best power ballad up to that point. Sam Law of Kerrang! called the song one of the "softest cuts" in My Chemical Romance's discography, with its orchestration and acoustic instruments making it distinct from the band's other songs; he labeled it as a "diamond in the rough" in the band's work. Spinks praised the song for its lack of "cringey lyricism" that she felt was present on other songs, and called it a simple, yet interesting and "cinematic-feeling" track. However, she felt that the song could've been shorter. Whitt and Richardson wrote that, "if you have ever experienced the grief of losing someone dear to you, this song is guaranteed to give you chills and, most likely, make you cry". Em Moore of Exclaim! said that the song was "beautiful, even though it hurts", describing the instrumentals as containing an "almost unbearable amount of emotion".

Both songs have placed in retrospective rankings of My Chemical Romance's discography, with "The Light Behind Your Eyes" generally being ranked higher than "The World Is Ugly". Moore ranked the former as the band's tenth-best song. Law and Eloise both ranked it as the band's twentieth best song. Whitt and Richardson ranked it at twenty-second, and Spinks ranked it at forty-eight. Meanwhile, "The World Is Ugly" was ranked by Whitt and Richardson as the band's thirty-seventh best song. Spinks placed it at seventy-two; comparatively, she placed it as the band's seventh-worst song.

== Personnel ==
Credits are adapted from the digital liner notes.

Musicians

- Gerard Way – vocals, songwriter
- Bob Bryar – drums, songwriter
- Frank Iero – guitar, vocals, songwriter
- Mikey Way – bass, songwriter
- Ray Toro – guitar, songwriter

Technicals

- Brendan O'Brien – producer
- Rich Costey – audio mixing

== Charts ==
Chart performance
Chart (2012–2013)	Peak position
Scottish Singles Sales (Official Charts)	95
UK Singles (Official Charts)	113
UK Rock & Metal (Official Charts)	1
US Hot Singles Sales (Billboard)	3
