= Boy Division / Tomorrow's Money =

2012 songs by My Chemical Romance

"Boy Division" / "Tomorrow's Money"
- "Number One" single cover art

Single by My Chemical Romance

from the album Conventional Weapons
- Released: October 30, 2012
- Genre: Pop-punk ("Boy Division"); Garage punk ("Tomorrow's Money")
- Length: 2:55 ("Boy Division"); 3:13 ("Tomorrow's Money")
- Label: Reprise
- Songwriters: Gerard Way; Ray Toro; Frank Iero; Mikey Way; Bob Bryar
- Producer: Brendan O'Brien

Audio
- "Boy Division" on YouTube "Tomorrow's Money" on YouTube

"Boy Division" and "Tomorrow's Money" are songs by the American rock band My Chemical Romance from their compilation album, Conventional Weapons (2013). Together, they were released as the first single from the compilation, "Number One", on October 30, 2012. They were originally created in 2009 when the band first worked on Conventional Weapons and intended for it to be their fourth studio album, before scrapping the project in favor of Danger Days: The True Lives of the Fabulous Killjoys (2010).

"Boy Division" is a pop-punk song that consists of a series of one-liners and independent hooks, while "Tomorrow's Money" is a garage punk track with surf rock influences. Upon the release of Conventional Weapons, both songs were met with a positive response from critics. Retrospective opinions have generally ranked "Boy Division" higher than "Tomorrow's Money". In the United Kingdom, the single reached number 2 on the UK Rock & Metal chart, and number 76 on the UK singles chart. It reached number 30 on the Billboard Hot Rock & Alternative Songs chart in the United States. "Boy Division" was later played during the band's reunion tour in 2022.

== Background and release ==
My Chemical Romance began work on Conventional Weapons, intending for it to be their fourth studio album, in 2009. Unlike their previous works that were typically concept albums, the band wanted to create a "straight-ahead rock ’n’ roll record" with no story or characters, with songs that worked better in party settings. Writing for the album began in February, and production began in June. Recording took place at A&M Studios; Brendan O'Brien served as the producer.

Among the songs written for the album were "Boy Division" and "Tomorrow's Money". The title of the former was believed to have been mentioned in discussions by the band as early as during the production of their previous album The Black Parade (2006). However, it is unclear whether or not the song itself was actually made at the time, or if it was just the title. The band ultimately scrapped Conventional Weapons in favor of Danger Days: The True Lives of the Fabulous Killjoys (2010), which would be their fourth studio album.

In late 2012, My Chemical Romance announced that they would be releasing ten songs from Conventional Weapons, two each month across five singles, from October 2012 to February 2013. The first single, officially titled "Number One", was released on October 30, 2012, featuring "Boy Division" as the main A-side track and "Tomorrow's Money" as the B-side. Upon release, the single reached number 76 on the UK singles chart and number two on the UK Rock & Metal chart in the United Kingdom, and number 30 on the Billboard Hot Rock & Alternative Songs chart in the United States. Both songs were first played live by the band during their reunion tour in 2022, with "Boy Division" being played on May 17 and "Tomorrow's Money" being played on May 24.

== Music ==
"Boy Division" is a pop-punk song; Alternative Press described it as "emo-punk". Raul Stanciu of Sputnikmusic said that it was "high octane", and David Renshaw of NME compared it to one of the band's singles, "I'm Not Okay (I Promise)" (2004). Lyrically, the song consists of a series of "violent" one-liners and hooks, most of which are unrelated to each other. Katie Clare of Louder Than War believed that the song's lyrics were about the success and popularity the band faced after the release of The Black Parade. Sam Law of Kerrang! described the lyrics as "playful".

"Tomorrow's Money" is a garage punk song with aspects of surf rock. Renshaw felt that it had a "spaghetti Western sound". According to Claire, some of the song's lyrics—particularly the line "Who kills a boy without a T-shirt to sell / You keep your money / I’ll see you in hell"—could be interpreted in multiple ways, from cyberbullying to intrusion in one's personal life. The song's lyrics touch on the success the band found with The Black Parade ("I stopped bleeding 3 years ago / While you keep screaming for revolution").

== Critical reception ==
Writing for Kerrang!, Jake Richardson described "Boy Division" as the song that stood out the most from Conventional Weapons, writing that it was for the song's "sheer ferocity". Similarly, Clare said that the song "checks all the pop punk boxes", and helped make listeners attached to Conventional Weapons and look forward to the other songs in the collection that had yet to be released. Cassie Whitt and Richardson of Loudwire said that the song was a "final masterpiece" that could have been worked on for several years, saying that it was "perfectly executed" and lyrically clever". Renshaw described it as a "fast and furious punk anthem". Chloe Spinks of Gigwise believed that the song was an example of what made the band "alluring", highlighting front man and singer Gerard Way's performance.

Discussing "Tomorrow's Money", Spinks said that songs like it were "ultimately unspecial, rock songs" propped up by the production quality of Conventional Weapons. She highlighted the song's percussion and the line delivery of "I stopped bleeding three years ago", deeming the latter as "primed for a jumping, yelling, mass to become one with the music". Clare thought that the song had more "depth and texture" than "Boy Division", but felt they were largely similar, describing them as "born of the same creative mixing jar".

In their retrospective rankings of the band's discography, Sam Law of Kerrang! ranked "Boy Division" as the eighth-best song that the band had made, while Whitt and Richardson of Loudwire ranked it at seventeenth. On both lists, it was the highest-ranking song from "Conventional Weapons". Spinks of Gigwise ranked it at fifty-first. In a readers poll by Alternative Press for the most underrated My Chemical Romance songs, "Boy Division" was voted as the band's fourth most underrated. "Tomorrow's Money" was generally ranked lower than "Boy Division", with Whitt and Richardson ranking it at sixty-seventh and Spinks ranking it at sixty-first.

== Personnel ==
Adapted from the digital liner notes.

Musicians

- Gerard Way – vocals, songwriter
- Bob Bryar – drums, songwriter
- Frank Iero – guitar, vocals, songwriter
- Mikey Way – bass, songwriter
- Ray Toro – guitar, songwriter

Technicals

- Brendan O'Brien – producer

== Charts ==
Chart performance for "Boy Division"
| Chart (2012) | Peak position |
|---|---|
| Scottish Singles Sales (Official Charts) | 68 |
| South Korea International (Circle) | 37 |
| UK Singles (Official Charts) | 76 |
| UK Rock & Metal (Official Charts) | 2 |
| US Hot Rock & Alternative Songs (Billboard) | 30 |
| US Hot Singles Sales (Billboard) | 2 |
