= Bulletproof Heart (song) =

2011 single by My Chemical Romance

Single by My Chemical Romance

from the album Danger Days: The True Lives of the Fabulous Killjoys
- Released: June 13, 2011
- Genre: Pop rock; power pop
- Length: 4:56
- Label: Reprise
- Songwriters: Bob Bryar; Frank Iero; Ray Toro; Mikey Way; Gerard Way
- Producers: Rob Cavallo; My Chemical Romance

My Chemical Romance singles chronology
"Planetary (Go!)" (2011)	"Bulletproof Heart" (2011)	"The Only Hope for Me Is You" (2011)

Official audio
- "Bulletproof Heart" on YouTube

"Bulletproof Heart" is a song by the American rock band My Chemical Romance from their fourth studio album, Danger Days: The True Lives of the Fabulous Killjoys (2010). Originally titled "Trans Am", "Bulletproof Heart" has been characterized as a pop rock and power pop song; its lyrics focus on running away from home. It was one of the last songs recorded for Danger Days, being a favorite amongst the band. The song was written by Bob Bryar, Frank Iero, Ray Toro, Gerard Way, and Mikey Way, and was produced by the group alongside Rob Cavallo.

"Bulletproof Heart" was released as the album's fourth single on June 13, 2011. It peaked at number 39 on the UK Rock & Metal Singles chart in the United Kingdom, number 42 on the Hot Rock & Alternative Songs chart in the United States, and at number 28 on the Mexico Ingles Airplay charts. A music video for "Bulletproof Heart" was intended to start production in April 2011, but was scrapped by early 2012. It received positive reviews from critics, with many praising its composition. The band performed the song during the World Contamination Tour (2010–2012), their 2019-2023 reunion tour, and the 2025-2026 Long Live The Black Parade tour.

== Background ==
Following the critical success of their third studio album, The Black Parade (2006). My Chemical Romance began to work on their fourth studio album in June 2009; however, the band abruptly shelved the project due to being unsatisfied with the result. The band decided to restart production of the album, wanting to create an album that was the direct opposite of The Black Parade. During this process, they had started developing a song titled "Trans Am", which was about a boy named Johnny and a girl named Jenny running away from home, it would later resurface as "Bulletproof Heart". According to frontman Gerard Way, it was one of the last songs they recorded for the album, claiming that it was a favorite amongst the band. "Bulletproof Heart" was among one of the four songs from the original recording sessions that made it onto the album, following "The Only Hope for Me Is You", "Party Poison", and "Save Yourself, I'll Hold Them Back".

== Composition and lyrics ==
It's a fictional, metaphorical song really, but one about leaving home and running away – about doing whatever you can to run away. Because that's the point of starting a band – you get in the van to run away.

— Gerard Way on the meaning of "Bulletproof Heart"

"Bulletproof Heart" is a pop rock and power pop song that is four minutes and fifty-six seconds long. Eli Enis of Paste referred to it as "a beaming space shuttle of crunchy riffs". It opens with quiet synth sound that grows ever more captivating, it then jumps into an appreciable alt-rock anthem. Over the course of the run-time, it is full of synthesizers and powerful guitars, featuring a guitar solo played by Ray Toro and "glam-tinged" vocals from Way. Lyrically, the song is about running away from home and taking your car, with references to the song "Jenny Was a Friend of Mine" (2004) by the Killers, particularly in the lyric "Jenny, could you come back home?". The track has multiple instances of Way yelling "These pigs are after me" over a stripped-down guitar riff. The track was written by all five members of the band and was produced by the group alongside Rob Cavallo. "Bulletproof Heart" is one of the few songs from Danger Days that drummer Bob Bryar received songwriting credits on, prior to his departure from the band in March 2010.

== Release ==
Danger Days: The True Lives of the Fabulous Killjoys was released on November 22, 2010 through Reprise Records, with "Bulletproof Heart" as the third track, placed between "Na Na Na (Na Na Na Na Na Na Na Na Na)" and "Sing". In the United States, it was subsequently released onto alternative radio stations on March 22, 2011, and was later released in the United Kingdom as the fourth single from the album on June 13. In the United Kingdom, the song peaked at number 39 on the Rock & Metal Singles chart the week of June 25, 2011, and peaked at number 42 on the Hot Rock & Alternative Songs chart in the United States. It also peaked at number 28 on the Mexico Ingles Airplay charts. My Chemical Romance also performed "Bulletproof Heart" live on various occasions after its release, including during the World Contamination Tour (2010–2012), their 2019-2023 reunion tour, and the 2025-2026 Long Live The Black Parade tour. According to Craig Aaronson, "Bulletproof Heart" was originally considered to be the album's lead single, however "Na Na Na (Na Na Na Na Na Na Na Na Na)" was chosen instead.

=== Music video ===
Production for a music video began in April 2011, the band were initially unsure if the Killjoys, a group of rebellious rogues living in a post-apocalyptic California in the year 2019, would make a return, after being killed off in the previous music video for "Sing". Way stated that the band was "unsure if it's going to go back to that world". The video never materialized, and in January 2012, it was announced that it had been scrapped.

== Critical reception ==
"Bulletproof Heart" received generally positive reviews from critics. Melissa Maerz of Rolling Stone described it as a "Red Bull-fueled stomp". Additionally, Enis placed the song at number 1 out of 10 in a list of the band's most underrated songs, calling it an "utterly soaring pop-rock song" which was "criminally underrated since its release". Xenophanes, a staff writer of Sputnikmusic, praised the song for its guitar solo and bass lines. Jonah Bayer of Alternative Press also praised the song for Toro's solo. In contrast, David Edwards of Drowned in Sound claimed the song managed to drift into repetitive circles after its stop-start guitar riff at the beginning. chorus.fm's Adam Grundy deemed "Bulletproof Heart" his favorite on the album, calling it a "impressive deep cut".

In retrospective rankings of the band's discography, Jake Richardson of Loudwire placed the song at number 34 out of 71, characterizing it as a "shiny blend of pomp, punk and a splash of pizzazz." Marianne Eloise of The Forty-Five claimed the track was "a lot of fun" and that "it'll have you imagining that you’re running through the desert with My Chemical Romance". Chloe Spinks of Gigwise placed it at number 58 out of 79 in her ranking of the band's songs, particularly praising it for its bridge, also stating that it is one of her favorite things My Chemical Romance created.

== Credits and personnel ==
Credits are adapted from Apple Music.

My Chemical Romance

- Gerard Way – lead vocals, songwriter, producer
- Ray Toro – background vocals, lead guitar, songwriter, producer
- Frank Iero – background vocals, rhythm guitar, songwriter, producer
- Mikey Way – bass guitar, songwriter, producer

Additional performing artists

- Dorian Crozier - drums
- Jamie Muhoberac – keyboards, sound design

Additional personnel

- Bob Bryar – songwriter, producer
- Rob Cavallo – producer
- Chris Lord-Alge – mixing engineer
- Doug McKean – recording engineer
- Lars Fox – recording engineer
- Dan Chase – recording engineer, additional engineer
- Joe Libretti – drum technician
- Alan Bergman – guitar technician
- R.J. Ronquillo – guitar technician, recording technician
- Todd Schofield – guitar technician, recording technician
- Joe Libretti – drum technician, recording technician
- Andrew Schubert – additional engineer
- Brad Townsend – additional engineer
- Steve Rea – assistant recording engineer
- Russ Waugh – assistant recording engineer
- Keith Armstrong – assistant mixing engineer
- Nik Karpen – assistant mixing engineer

== Charts ==
Chart performance
Chart (2011)	Peak position
Mexico Ingles Airplay (Billboard)	28
UK Rock & Metal (Official Charts)	39
US Hot Rock & Alternative Songs (Billboard)	42

== Release history ==
Release history
Region	Date	Format	Label	Ref.
United States	March 22, 2011	Alternative radio	Reprise	
United Kingdom	June 13, 2011	CD single	Reprise	
