= Fake Your Death =

2014 single by My Chemical Romance

Single by My Chemical Romance

from the album May Death Never Stop You
- Released: February 17, 2014
- Recorded: 2012
- Length: 3:20
- Label: Reprise
- Songwriters: James Dewees; Frank Iero; Ray Toro; Gerard Way; Mikey Way
- Producers: Rob Cavallo; Doug McKean; My Chemical Romance

My Chemical Romance singles chronology
"The Kids from Yesterday" (2012)	"Fake Your Death" (2014)	"The Foundations of Decay" (2022)

Music video
- "Fake Your Death" on YouTube

"Fake Your Death" is a song by the American rock band My Chemical Romance. The track was originally written during the band's unsuccessful 2012 sessions for their fifth studio album. It was later released as a single for their greatest hits album, May Death Never Stop You (2014), on February 17, 2014. "Fake Your Death" was written by band members James Dewees, Frank Iero, Ray Toro, Gerard Way, and Mikey Way, and was produced by the group alongside Rob Cavallo and Doug McKean.

A "bittersweet" song which begins as a piano ballad, the lyrics of "Fake Your Death" have been interpreted as being about the band's 2013 breakup, with Gerard Way referring to the song as being an unintentional "eulogy" for the band. An accompanying music video for the track, additionally serving as a trailer for May Death Never Stop You, featured a montage of clips from the band's previous music videos. The song received generally positive reviews from music critics, who deemed "Fake Your Death" as a strong final effort for the band. The song topped the UK Rock & Metal Singles Chart, and appeared on various other charts.

== Background and release ==
In 2012, following the end of the tour cycle for their fourth studio album Danger Days: The True Lives of the Fabulous Killjoys (2010), My Chemical Romance returned to Los Angeles to set up a studio and begin writing their fifth studio album under the working title of The Paper Kingdom. Originally, the record was planned to be a concept album about a "group of parents in a support group because they had all lost their children in a horrible way". One of the songs written for the album was "Fake Your Death". Gerard Way noted that it was written during the 2012 Stanley Cup Final, and "started to form" later that day when the other band members arrived at the studio after the game. However, the album was ultimately scrapped, with the majority of the songs from the sessions being too unfinished to be released; the band would break up the following year in March 2013.

On January 21, 2014, May Death Never Stop You, the band's greatest hits album, was announced, with a release date of March 24, 2014; "Fake Your Death", billed as a "previously-unreleased song", was announced as being the album's first track. The song debuted on BBC Radio 1 ahead of the album's release on February 17, 2014, and was released to iTunes as a single the same day. The track was released to other streaming services starting the following day. Additionally, an accompanying music video for "Fake Your Death" was released to the My Chemical Romance's YouTube channel on the 17th. The video, also serving as a trailer for May Death Never Stop You, features a montage of clips from the band's previous music videos, as well as behind-the-scenes footage. The song made its live debut on October 17, 2022 at the Kia Forum in Inglewood, California during the band's reunion tour.

== Composition and lyrics ==
"Fake Your Death" is a "bittersweet" song, which starts as a piano ballad before drums, guitar, and handclaps are introduced; My Chemical Romance biographer Tom Bryant observed how the song had an "almost AOR-like stomp". It is in the key of G major and is set in common time, and runs at the tempo of 104 beats per minute. Various critics noted the song's stylistic similarity to those on the band's 2006 studio album The Black Parade, with Hanif Willis-Abdurraqib of MTV News considering the song a "companion piece" to the album.

Lyrically, the song was interpreted as being on the band's breakup, with Gerard Way noting in a statement that the song unintentionally served as a "eulogy" for the band. James Montgomery of MTV News wrote that "Fake Your Death" was a reflection on the band's rise, while also serving as a "farewell to MCR's fervent fans". Similarly, Jake Richardson of Loudwire highlighted the lyric "I choose defeat, I walk away and leave this place the same today" as reflecting the song's interpretation as a eulogy. Willis-Abdurraqib provided an alternate view on the song's lyrics, suggesting that the song was instead about "shedding old skin and stepping into a newer, lighter version of oneself".

== Reception ==
"Fake Your Death" received generally positive reviews from music critics, with Montgomery calling it a "fitting send-off" for the band and a "true testament to [their] enduring greatness". In reviews of the compilation, Evan Sawdey of PopMatters praised "Fake Your Death" for being a "solid anthem" though "a bit mainstream in intent", while Alternative Addiction described the song as "decent", comparing it to the quality of the band's 2013 Conventional Weapons singles. Ali Cooper of Alternative Press placed "Fake Your Death" at the second spot of a list of the 10 most underrated My Chemical Romance songs, noting how it was overshadowed by the announcement of May Death Never Stop You but remained the "swan song fans needed". In reviews of the band's discography as a whole, Cassie Whitt and Jake Richardson of Loudwire placed the song at number 43 of 71, with the latter praising it as being "one final reminder" of the band's music while Chloe Spinks of Gigwise placed the song at number 53 of 79, calling it "simple but effective".

In the United Kingdom, "Fake Your Death" topped the UK Rock & Metal Singles Chart, and reached a peak position of 63 on the UK singles chart. In Europe as a whole, the song reached the Finnish Airplay chart (49), and the Czech Republic's Rádio – Top 100 chart (66). The song also appeared on the Mexico Ingles Airplay chart (45) and the US Hot Rock & Alternative Songs chart (47).

== Credits and personnel ==
Credits are adapted from Apple Music.

My Chemical Romance
- Gerard Way – lead vocals, songwriter, producer
- Ray Toro – background vocals, lead guitar, songwriter, producer
- Frank Iero – background vocals, rhythm guitar, songwriter, producer
- Mikey Way – bass guitar, songwriter, producer
- James Dewees – keyboards, songwriter, producer

Additional performing artists

- Jarrod Alexander – drums, percussion
Additional personnel
- Doug McKean – producer, engineer
- Rob Cavallo – producer
- Chris Lord-Alge – mixing engineer
- Ted Jensen – mastering engineer
- Lars Fox – additional engineer
- Nik Karpen – assistant mixing engineer
- Keith Armstrong – assistant mixing engineer
- Dmitar Krnjaic – assistant engineer
- Andrew Law – assistant engineer
- Tom Rasulo – assistant engineer

== Charts ==
Weekly chart positions for "Fake Your Death"
Chart (2014)	Peak position
Czech Republic Airplay (ČNS IFPI)	66
Finland Airplay (Radiosoittolista)	49
Mexico Ingles Airplay (Billboard)	45
Scottish Singles Sales (Official Charts)	58
UK Singles (Official Charts)	63
UK Rock & Metal (Official Charts)	1
US Hot Rock & Alternative Songs (Billboard)	47

== Release history ==
Release history for "Fake Your Death"
Region	Date	Format	Label(s)	Ref.
Various	February 17, 2014	Digital download; streaming	Reprise	
Italy	February 28, 2014	Radio airplay	Reprise	
