= Kiss the Ring (disambiguation) =

Kiss the Ring is a 2012 studio album by DJ Khaled

Kiss the Ring may also refer to:

- Kiss the Ring (Rome Streetz album), 2022 studio album by Rome Streetz
- "Kiss the Ring" (My Chemical Romance song), 2013 song by My Chemical Romance, from Conventional Weapons
- "Kiss the Ring" (The Offer), a 2022 television episode

== See also ==
- Kissing the ring, a diplomatic gesture
