= The Foundations of Decay =

2022 single by My Chemical Romance

Single by My Chemical Romance
- Released: May 12, 2022
- Genre: Progressive rock; gothic rock; post-hardcore
- Length: 6:00
- Label: Reprise; Warner
- Songwriters: Frank Iero; Ray Toro; Gerard Way; Mikey Way
- Lyricist: Gerard Way
- Producers: Doug McKean; Gerard Way; Ray Toro

My Chemical Romance singles chronology
| "Fake Your Death" (2014) | "The Foundations of Decay" (2022) |

Music video
- "The Foundations of Decay" on YouTube

"The Foundations of Decay" is a song by the American rock band My Chemical Romance. It was surprise-released as a single on May 12, 2022, by Reprise Records. It was written by all four band members with lyrics by lead singer Gerard Way, and produced by Doug McKean, Way, and guitarist Ray Toro. Alongside the band's main lineup, it features drummer Jarrod Alexander and keyboardist Jamie Muhoberac. It was the band's first release since the single "Fake Your Death" (2014).

The song has been described as progressive rock, gothic rock, and post-hardcore, with elements from several rock and heavy metal genres. Its lyrics focus on the band's history and legacy, as well as the September 11 attacks, which resulted in the band's creation. They also explore ideas such as incorruptibility, canonization, and misogyny.

"The Foundations of Decay" was well received by critics, who praised its composition and themes. Several publications considered it one of the best songs released in 2022. It charted in several countries, reaching number 1 on the Rock & Metal chart in the United Kingdom and number 132 on the Billboard Global 200. On May 16, the band debuted it live at the Eden Project, and Warner Records released the song onto mainstream rock radio a day later. It was used as the opening song for every show of the band's Reunion Tour afterwards.

== Background, production and release ==
Six years after their break-up, My Chemical Romance reunited for a reunion show on December 20, 2019. They subsequently scheduled more shows worldwide, including a run of summer festival shows in mainland Europe and a North American tour. In June 2021, the band's lead singer Gerard Way stated in an interview that he was working on music with Doug McKean, the engineer behind two of the band's past studio albums, The Black Parade (2006) and Danger Days: The True Lives of the Fabulous Killjoys (2010).

McKean produced "The Foundations of Decay" alongside Way and guitarist Ray Toro. McKean also engineered the song, Rich Costey and Jeff Citron mixed it and Mike Bozzi mastered it. Alongside the main band lineup of Gerard Way, guitarists Toro and Frank Iero, and bassist Mikey Way, it features Jarrod Alexander on drums and Jamie Muhoberac on keyboard. Gerard Way wrote the lyrics, and all four members are credited for songwriting. "The Foundations of Decay" was the last project McKean worked on before his death in July 2022. In 2026, Gerard Way said that the band planned to make more music after "The Foundations of Decay", but that McKean's death caused these plans to be cancelled.

"The Foundations of Decay" was surprise-released digitally on May 12, 2022, by Reprise Records. Warner Records released it to mainstream rock radio on May 17. It was the band's first single since "Fake Your Death" in 2014. The cover art and visualizer video on YouTube, the former of which was designed by Aaron Hymes, depict mounds of swarming flies. The song was used as the opening track for every show of the band's Reunion Tour; the first show of the tour at the Eden Project on May 16 marked the song's first live performance. They later performed it at 2022's Riot Fest and during their Long Live The Black Parade tour (2025).

== Music ==
=== Composition ===
"The Foundations of Decay" is a six-minute long song that has been described as progressive rock, gothic rock, and post-hardcore. It also incorporates elements of doom metal, basement punk, arena rock, post-metal, metalcore, and noise rock. Em Moore of Exclaim! described it as featuring several "acts" that individually showcase the "myriad ways the band have expanded their sound, bringing in more elements from noise rock, doom and prog". The New York Times characterized it as "prog-emo".

The song opens up with static noise before introducing a mellow electric guitar, piano, and a "laid-back drumbeat" paired with Gerard Way's distorted vocals. It then crescendos into the chorus, which Hannah Dailey of Billboard described as having "anthemic force" in a similar vein to the band's 2006 single "Welcome to the Black Parade". Ali Shutler of NME compared the opening guitar to the intro of Aerosmith's "Dream On" (1973). "The Foundations of Decay" goes between guitar breakdowns and slower-paced moments that highlight the lyrics, which were described by Dailey as "electric guitar-stamped rage fests" and "simmering moments of storytelling", respectively. Shutler opined that the composition combined elements from their past studio albums, viewing the guitar breakdown as similar to one from The Black Parade. Maria Sherman of NPR compared the song to ones found on the band's first album, I Brought You My Bullets, You Brought Me Your Love (2002). Sherman and Moore compared it to that album's "Demolition Lovers", Moore likening their usage of multiple acts and Sherman viewing their opening guitar segments as similar.

=== Lyrics ===
"The Foundations of Decay"
An excerpt of the second part of "The Foundations of Decay", which references the band's origins and the September 11 attacks. Cassie Whitt of Alternative Press viewed this verse as referencing the hero's journey trope.

The lyrics discuss the band's origins and legacy. Shutler described the song's opening as Gerard Way "wrestling" his legacy and age ("Let the flesh submit itself to gravity"), and viewed some of the lyrics as him battling nihilism, nostalgia, as well as finding safety behind doing nothing. When discussing the group's beginnings, the song references the September 11 attacks, Gerard Way describing his experiences that day which led to the creation of My Chemical Romance.

As the song continues, it becomes more optimistic and hopeful as Gerard Way says to go "against faith". The guitar breakdown in the middle of the track consists of Gerard Way screaming in a manner that Eli Enis of Revolver viewed as reminiscent of black metal. By the end of the track, Gerard Way softly expresses his desire to continue doing nothing ("Yes, it comforts me much more" / "To lay in the foundations of decay") as the song begins to fade out, before he yells "get up coward". Dailey described the ending as a "scream-filled free-for-all".

Cassie Whitt of Alternative Press suggested that the lyrics also contain Catholic imagery and themes, with laying in the "foundations of decay" representing incorruptibility and waiting for canonization; she opined that the same verse also covers misogyny ("And so he gets to die a saint" / "But she will always be a whore"). Whitt also viewed the verse about the September 11 attacks as similar to the hero's journey trope, seeing each lyric as representing a specific stage of the trope: the call to adventure, the adventure begins, the allies made, and the trials and ordeals. She also suggested that the full song can be interpreted as someone refusing to accept the call to adventure until a supernatural force intervenes, represented by the "get up coward" line.

== Critical reception and legacy ==
Many writers praised the song's composition. Sarah Jamieson of DIY viewed it as combing the band's past works into one, describing it as a "slow burning offering that swells into frenetic life" throughout its runtime and highlighting its latter half. Shutler considered it to be a reinvention for the band with "fire, urgency and plenty of joy". Mitchell Peters of Billboard highlighted Gerard Way's performance, calling it as "impeccable". Dailey described the song as going from "guitar-stamped rage fests" to "simmering moments of storytelling"; Enis characterized it as their heaviest release since Three Cheers for Sweet Revenge (2004).

Several writers commended the lyrics and themes, Peters writing that they demonstrated My Chemical Romance's storytelling capabilities. Shutler believed that the song's lyrics demonstrated that the band had not lost any of its talent during their time apart. He further wrote that while the band writing new music could have been risky due to the reverence for their past works, it was "never [...] bogged down with legacy". Jack Rodgers of Rock Sound described it as "six minutes of dark, destitute and dramatic story-telling and world-building" unlike anything the band had released up to that point.

Jamieson described the release as a "grand statement" and a "return of epic proportions", and Shutler called it a "fierce, fearless return". Rodgers deemed it a "defining moment" in the band's return that showed that they "[meant] serious business". In her review of the band's live performance at the Barclays Center in September 2022, Danielle Chelosky of Alternative Press described "The Foundations of Decay" as a quintessential song in My Chemical Romance's discography. In 2025, Moore ranked "The Foundations of Decay" as My Chemical Romance's fifteenth-best song, writing that the "wait for new music was well worth it".

Several media outlets listed it as one of the best songs of 2022; the staff teams of The Los Angeles Times and NME ranked it as the twenty-second- and twenty-third-best song of the year, respectively. Suzy Exposito of The Los Angeles Times described it as a "fist, bursting defiantly from the soil" towards people who thought that emo music was no longer relevant. NME called it a comeback that exceeded the expectations of both older and newer emo music fans. Rodgers included it in an un-ranked list of the year's ten best songs.

== Commercial performance ==
"The Foundations of Decay" debuted at number 132 on the Billboard Global 200. In the United States, "The Foundations of Decay" received 497,000 streams and sold 1,900 digital copies within a few hours of its release. In its first few days, it received 1.1 million radio audience impressions. In a Billboard readers' poll, it was voted by over 40% of readers as the week's best song.

It peaked at number 2 on the Bubbling Under Hot 100 chart, 7 on Hot Rock & Alternative Songs, 11 on Digital Song Sales, and 16 on Rock & Alternative Airplay. On the Year-End charts, "The Foundations of Decay" ranked at number 24 on the US Hot Hard Rock Songs chart. In the United Kingdom, it reached number one on the Rock & Metal chart and number 37 on the UK Singles Chart. It was the band's ninth top-40 single in the country. Elsewhere, the song reached number 7 on the New Zealand Hot Singles Chart, 56 in Ireland, 80 in Australia, and 92 in Canada.

== Personnel ==
Credits are adapted from the digital liner notes.

Musicians

- Gerard Way – lead vocals, synthesizer, songwriter, producer, lyricist
- Jarrod Alexander – drums
- Frank Iero – rhythm guitar, backing vocals, songwriter
- Jamie Muhoberac – keyboards
- Mikey Way – bass, songwriter
- Ray Toro – lead guitar, songwriter, producer

Technicals

- Mike Bozzi – mastering engineer
- Rich Costey – mixing engineer
- Doug McKean – recording engineer, producer
- Jeff Citron – assistant mixing engineer

== Charts ==
=== Weekly charts ===
Weekly chart performance for "The Foundations of Decay"
| Chart (2022) | Peak position |
|---|---|
| Australia (ARIA) | 80 |
| Canada Hot 100 (Billboard) | 92 |
| Global 200 (Billboard) | 132 |
| Ireland (IRMA) | 56 |
| New Zealand Hot Singles (RMNZ) | 7 |
| UK Singles (Official Charts) | 37 |
| UK Rock & Metal (Official Charts) | 1 |
| US Bubbling Under Hot 100 (Billboard) | 2 |
| US Digital Song Sales (Billboard) | 11 |
| US Hot Rock & Alternative Songs (Billboard) | 7 |
| US Rock & Alternative Airplay (Billboard) | 16 |

=== Year-end charts ===
Year-end chart performance for "The Foundations of Decay"
| Chart (2022) | Position |
|---|---|
| US Hot Hard Rock Songs (Billboard) | 24 |

== Release history ==
Release history for "The Foundations of Decay"
| Region | Date | Format | Label | Ref. |
|---|---|---|---|---|
| Various | May 12, 2022 | Digital download; streaming | Reprise | |
| United States | May 17, 2022 | Mainstream rock radio | Warner | |
