= Conventional Weapons =

2013 compilation album by My Chemical Romance

Compilation album by My Chemical Romance
- Released: February 5, 2013 (box set)
- Recorded: 2009
- Length: 38:26
- Label: Reprise
- Producer: Brendan O'Brien

My Chemical Romance chronology
Danger Days: The True Lives of the Fabulous Killjoys (2010)	Conventional Weapons (2012–2013)	May Death Never Stop You (2014)

Singles from Conventional Weapons
- 1. "Boy Division" / "Tomorrow's Money" Released: October 30, 2012; 2. "Ambulance" / "Gun." Released: November 23, 2012; 3. "The World is Ugly" / "The Light Behind Your Eyes" Released: December 18, 2012; 4. "Kiss the Ring" / "Make Room!!!!" Released: January 8, 2013; 5. "Surrender the Night" / "Burn Bright" Released: February 5, 2013

Conventional Weapons is a compilation album by the American rock band My Chemical Romance comprising five singles released between October 2012 and February 2013. Created in 2009 with Brendan O'Brien serving as producer, it was planned to be released as the band's fourth studio album as part of their initial vision to create a "straight-ahead rock 'n' roll record" that had no story or characters. As the band worked more on the album, they became increasingly dissatisfied with the result, and eventually scrapped it in favor of Danger Days: The True Lives of the Fabulous Killjoys (2010).

In late 2012, the band decided to release ten songs from the scrapped material from Conventional Weapons over the course of a few months. When the release cycle concluded on February 5, 2013, a box set containing all five singles was released through Reprise Records. The songs from Conventional Weapons vary in genre and themes, ranging from punk-sounding tracks to power ballads. One month after the release cycle for Conventional Weapons concluded, My Chemical Romance broke up, making it their final release as a band until their 2019 reunion.

== Background and production ==
Following the release of The Black Parade (2006), My Chemical Romance began work on their fourth studio album in June 2009. Unlike the band's previous works, which were typically concept albums, the band wanted to create a "straight-ahead rock 'n' roll record" with no story or characters, and songs that worked better in party settings. Writing for the album began in February, while production began in June. Brendan O'Brien served as the producer and recording took place at A&M Studios. The album was going to be called Save Yourself, I'll Hold Them Back, with Conventional Weapons Were No Match for Them also considered.

Their decision to create an album that had no overarching story or concept would go on to hinder their perspective on the album. Front man Gerard Way often found himself inconclusive on which songs he viewed as being of acceptable quality, and believed that the project lacked a vision due to its lack of a story or setting, something that previous My Chemical Romance albums had. The band began appearing on interviews in new attire that suggested a more mature rock era. The album's promotional cycle, including singles, was already selected. Multiple songs from the project had also been debuted live to positive responses from audiences.

As the band's concerns about the project grew, they contacted Rob Cavallo, the producer of The Black Parade, hoping he could help rework it or advise them on where to take it. He was initially confused about the band's direction for the project and said it sounded "like a band who had been in a car accident". Eventually, the band's vision for their fourth studio album would shift over as they began work on a completely separate idea from Conventional Weapons, based on the comic book idea The Killjoys. The band moved on from the Conventional Weapons material, with Cavallo encouraging them to effectively start over and prohibiting them from working any more on it unless they completely redid the songs or released them outright in their current state.

Four songs from Conventional Weapons would be reworked into songs for their new album—namely "The Only Hope for Me Is You", "Party Poison", "Save Yourself, I'll Hold Them Back" and "Bulletproof Heart"—while the rest of the project would be completely scrapped. It is believed that up to 28 songs were created during the Conventional Weapons recording sessions. Unreleased songs believed to have been made for Conventional Weapons include "The Drugs" and "Still Alive". The project that replaced Conventional Weapons would be released as Danger Days: The True Lives of the Fabulous Killjoys on November 22, 2010.

== Release ==
In late 2012, My Chemical Romance announced they would release ten songs from Conventional Weapons, two each month, from October 2012 to February 2013. The decision to release it as a series of singles was out of the band's desire to not want the material to be treated as a proper album, and not held to a similar standard as their previous work. Each single was named in numerical order of release, and only released digitally and through 7" vinyl physically. At the end of the release cycle, a box set was released that included the physical versions of each single, digital download codes for all of the songs, and a poster.

The first songs to be released from Conventional Weapons were "Boy Division" and "Tomorrow's Money", which were released on October 30, 2012. "Ambulance" and "Gun." were released on November 23, while "The World is Ugly" and "The Light Behind Your Eyes" were released on December 18. "Kiss the Ring" and "Make Room!!!!" were released on January 8, 2013, and "Surrender the Night" and "Burn Bright' were released on February 5.

== Music ==
Raul Stanciu of Sputnikmusic described the musical style of Conventional Weapons as a fusion of the "more down-to-earth Three Cheers For Sweet Revenge" and the "arena sized Black Parade", stating that the collection demonstrated a more calculated approach by the band towards their sound. The style and genre of each track from Conventional Weapons varies. Songs like "Boy Division", "Kiss the Ring", "Make Room!!!!", and "Tomorrow's Money" have been described as having a punk-like sound, the former of which has been compared to the band's single "I'm Not Okay (I Promise)", while "Gun." has been described as power-pop. Meanwhile, "The World is Ugly" and "The Light Behind Your Eyes" are power ballads, with the latter utilizing violins and acoustic guitars before introducing electric guitars later into its runtime. Lyrically, the topics covered on Conventional Weapons include accepting death and saying goodbye to your loved ones ("The Light Behind Your Eyes"), anti-war messages and seizing firearms from the civilization population ("Gun."), and love ("Surrender the Night").

== Reception and legacy ==
In their initial review of Conventional Weapons, Stanciu said that the compilation was one of the band's most satisfying records, believing that there was "little to no filler" and that none of the tracks "sound too bloated or cheesy". He also believed that it should've been completed and released when planned, and felt that it was superior to Danger Days, which he described as "horrid". In a retrospective article from Jake Richardson of Kerrang!, he described it as featuring some of My Chemical Romance's best songs, though felt that it demonstrated some of the problems that the band faced during its production, primarily the lack of a proper vision. He said that the songs, while good on their own, would sometimes clash and make the album feel disjointed when listened to from start to finish.

One month after the full release of Conventional Weapons, My Chemical Romance announced their break up on March 22, 2013, making it the band's last release until their reunion in 2019. During the band's reunion tour, several songs from Conventional Weapons were played during their shows, often marking the first time that those songs had been performed live. "Boy Division" and "Surrender the Night" were first played on May 17, 2022, at the Eden Project. "Burn Bright" was debuted on August 27 at the PNC Arena. "The World is Ugly" and "Make Room!!!!" were also performed during the tour. "Ambulance" was played live for the first time on July 4, 2026, at Bellahouston Park during their Long Live The Black Parade tour.

== Track listing ==
All tracks are written by Gerard Way, Ray Toro, Frank Iero, Mikey Way, and Bob Bryar.

Number One
No.	Title	Length
1.	"Boy Division"	2:55
2.	"Tomorrow's Money"	3:16
Total length:		6:13

Number Two
No.	Title	Length
3.	"Ambulance (Note: Stylized in all caps.)"	3:52
4.	"Gun."	3:39
Total length:		7:45

Number Three
No.	Title	Length
5.	"The World Is Ugly"	4:54
6.	"The Light Behind Your Eyes"	5:12
Total length:		10:06

Number Four
No.	Title	Length
7.	"Kiss the Ring"	3:09
8.	"Make Room!!!!"	3:42
Total length:		6:51

Number Five
No.	Title	Length
9.	"Surrender the Night"	3:27
10.	"Burn Bright"	4:17
Total length:		7:44

== Personnel ==
My Chemical Romance

- Gerard Way – lead vocals
- Frank Iero – guitars, backing vocals
- Ray Toro – guitars, backing vocals
- Mikey Way – bass guitar
- Bob Bryar – drums

Additional

- Brendan O'Brien – production
- Rich Costey – mixing
- Matt "Varnish" Taylor – art & design
