= Long Live The Black Parade =

2025–2026 concert tour by My Chemical Romance

- Tour by My Chemical Romance
- Promotional poster for the initial North America leg
- Location: Asia; Europe; North America; South America
- Associated album: The Black Parade
- Start date: July 11, 2025
- End date: November 22, 2026
- Legs: 7
- No. of shows: 47
- Attendance: 812,900
- Box office: $122,200,000+

My Chemical Romance concert chronology
- Reunion Tour (2019–2023); Long Live The Black Parade (2025–2026)

Long Live The Black Parade (Note: Originally titled Long Live: The Black Parade North American Tour. Also referred to as just Long Live. Later tour dates were announced under the title The Black Parade 2026.) was a concert tour by the American rock band My Chemical Romance in celebration of their third studio album, The Black Parade (2006). The tour began on July 11, 2025, in Seattle, and concluded on November 22, 2026, in Jakarta, Indonesia. For the tour, the band played The Black Parade in its entirety, as well as multiple other songs on a separate B-stage set.

A theatrical-styled production, Long Live follows an overarching narrative centered around the fictional authoritarian country of Draag. It sees the return of the band's Black-Parade alter-ego from the Black Parade World Tour in 2007, who in the show are performing to appease Draag's leader, known as the Grand Immortal Dictator (played by Wayne Jay). Each show of the tour progresses the story, which is told through interactions between the band and multiple other characters, such as the Clerk (Charlie Saxton) and Marianne (Lucy Joy Altus). Multiple songs from The Black Parade have been given modifications for the tour, ranging from new sections and introductions, to extended outros.

Long Live has been met with positive reviews, with several journalists praising its production, the creation of a new story for The Black Parade, and the B-stage sets. The tour's political messaging, which is a parody of political authoritarianism, were also widely discussed; some viewed it as an analogy of real world politics. The tour has grossed over $122 million, with an attendance of over 800,000.

== Background and history ==
My Chemical Romance released their third studio album, The Black Parade, in 2006. It was supported by The Black Parade World Tour, which began on February 22, 2007, where the band would play the album in its entirety as the "Black Parade" alter-ego band. They played as the alter-ego until October 7, 2007, when they declared the Black Parade as dead and stopped performing as them. On October 19 and 20, 2024, My Chemical Romance headlined the When We Were Young music festival, where they performed The Black Parade in its entirety for the first time since 2007.

My Chemical Romance announced Long Live The Black Parade on November 12, 2024. Initially, ten shows across North America were announced, spanning across 2025, with most of the shows taking place at Major League Baseball stadiums. Most dates on the tour have a unique opening act (e.g. Evanescence, 100 gecs). Due to high demand, the band had to schedule a second date in Los Angeles after tickets went on sale. In February 2025, it was announced that the band would be headlining that year's Shaky Knees Music Festival on September 20, 2025.

In May 2025, the band announced a show in Mexico City on February 13, 2026, officially advertised as "The Black Parade – Alive!". A second show in Mexico City taking place on February 14 was announced a few days later. In June, the band announced a series of dates throughout South America. Dates throughout Southeast Asia were announced in July. In August, the band announced two shows at Wembley Stadium in London for July 10 and July 11, 2026. On September 22, 2025, the band announced a second leg throughout the United States alongside multiple other dates in the United Kingdom and Europe, specifically Spain and Italy. All of the new dates went under the title "The Black Parade 2026".

In November 2025, two final dates for the tour at the Hollywood Bowl on October 30 and 31, 2026, advertised as "Devil's Night" in reference to them taking place on Halloween weekend. In combination with the final three dates of the previously announced leg taking place at the Hollywood Bowl, the concerts make My Chemical Romance the first band to perform at the venue five times and were also intended to be the final dates of the tour. In December, the band announced that the Southeast Asia leg of the tour would be delayed until November 2026, making the last scheduled date November 22, 2026 in Jakarta. They also delayed the first show of the Southern American leg in Colombia from January 22 to February 10.

=== Promotion ===
To promote the tour, My Chemical Romance released a series of teasers and trailers with cryptic meanings, sparking fan debate and speculation. On the day before the initial announcement of the tour in November, the band posted a teaser image on their Instagram page, depicting the skyline of a white city with pieces of confetti floating around, with the letters KCR arranged in a new logo. The post had the caption "If you could be anything, what would you be?". Several fans speculated that the announcement was for The Paper Kingdom, the band's planned fifth studio album that was scrapped before their initial break up in 2013.

When the tour was announced, the band released a trailer which features a dictator walking out onto a balcony to a cheering crowd in a white-colored dystopian city. The description of the trailer references the time that had passed since the last appearance of the Black Parade alter-ego, and made numerous references to a fictional dictatorship known as Draag. Other teasers related to the tour that were released included ones simply titled "Opera" and "Good Boy".

== Production ==
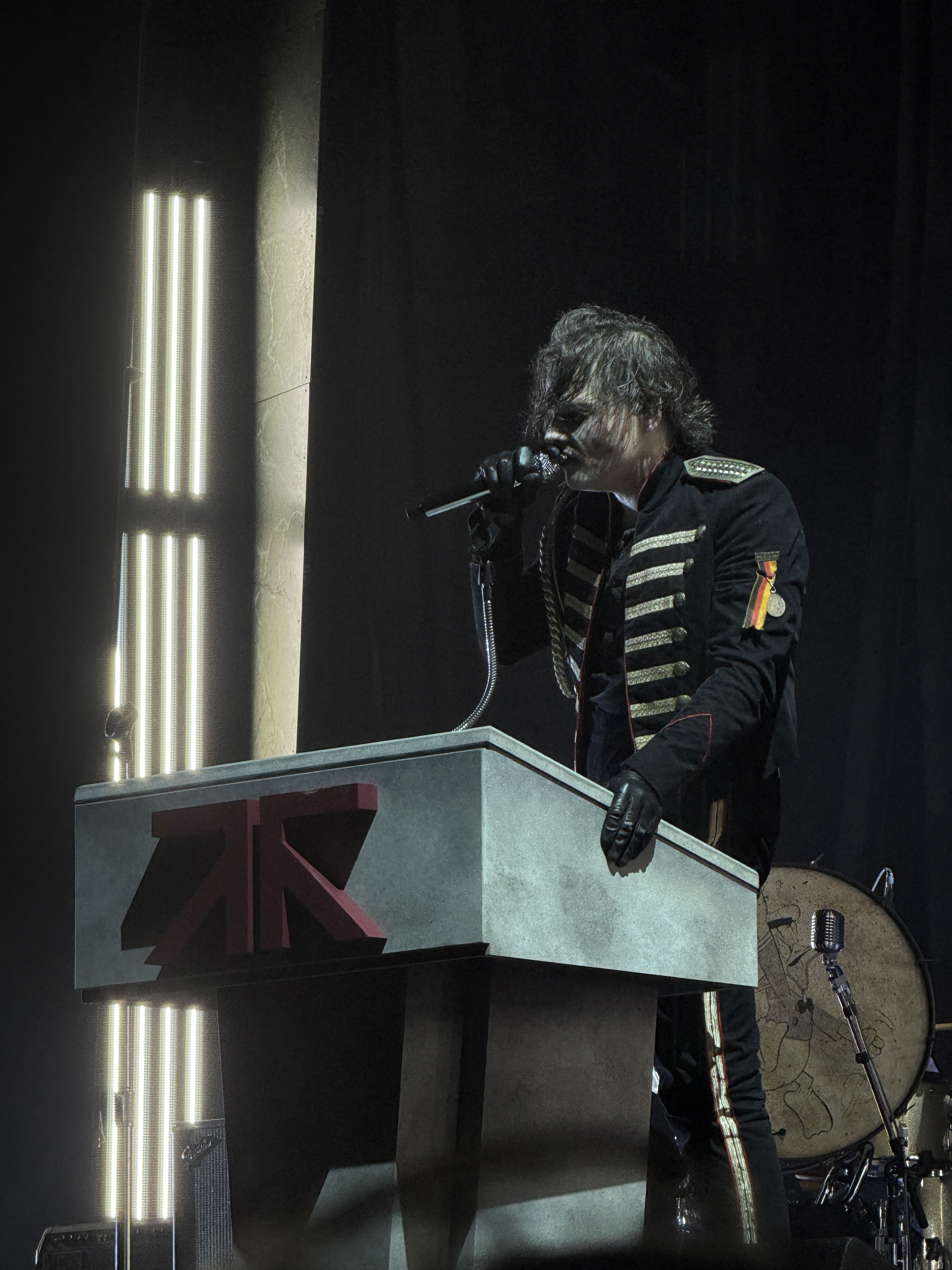
Lead singer Gerard Way, pictured in his Black Parade uniform

For Long Live The Black Parade shows, the band performs two different sets. For the first set, they dress up as their Black Parade alter-egos, performing The Black Parade in its entirety. Their outfits are updated versions of their original Black Parade uniforms. The set features a theatrical-styled production, with the band fully placing themselves into the role of the Black Parade while interacting with multiple other characters. The second set takes place on a B-stage, and features songs from the rest of My Chemical Romance's discography. Rob Sinclair serves as a lighting and production designer for the tour. According to Mike Shinoda, the co-vocalist of the rock band Linkin Park, the two bands planned to do a co-headling tour, but these did not develop further once Linkin Park learned that My Chemical Romance was planning Long Live.

In addition to the band's main line-up, the tour features several additional musicians, including drummer Jarrod Alexander, keyboardist Jamie Muhoberac, violinist Kayleigh Goldsworthy (who joins the band on "Cancer" and "Mama", specifically), and percussionist Tucker Rule. Other characters established for the tour include the Grand Immortal Dictator, the leader of the fictional country of Draag and played by Wayne Jay and watches the band from afar; the Gentleman, a ventriloquist dummy that the band met while in prison; Marianne, a guest opera singer played by Lucy Joy Altus; and The Clerk, played by Charlie Saxton. On certain dates, Marianne is replaced by another opera singer, Sylvia, who is played by Charlotte Kelso. The Dictator is also sometimes accompanied by his protégé, Veronika.

For the 2026 Latin American leg, the band were required to alter the tour production after they concluded that bringing the full Long Live production to the region was logistically impossible. For example, the band would've been unable to have a separate B-stage, which the North American dates had. As a result, Sinclair proposed that the Latin America dates serve as a prequel to the tour's overarching story, with a scaled back production.

The band's run of shows at the Hollywood Bowl feature their own unique production as well. Among the additions made to the performance were cheerleaders that came on stage while the band performed "Teenagers", and later performed in an on-stage choreographed gunfight during "Disenchanted". These cheerleaders had almost identical outfits to the Dallas Cowboys Cheerleaders, which led to a lawsuit from the cheerleader's brand owner, Pro Silver Star, to get My Chemical Romance to stop using the cheerleading teams likeliness. The motion was filed on October 22, after the first performance at the Hollywood Bowl. The band resumed using the same costumes on the following performance on October 23.

=== Draag ===
The production for Long Live The Black Parade is centered around Draag, a fictional authoritarian country ruled by the Grand Immortal Dictator. Throughout the tour, several ministries of the country were either referenced or made appearances, including the "Ministry of Menial Tasks", the "Ministry of Complimentary Reconditioning", and the "Ministry of Operatic Relations". Draag's national anthem is "Over Fields", which the band later uploaded onto social media. In the description of the trailer which announced the tour, it states that the Black Parade alter-ego had its work privilege reinstated to celebrate the culture and accomplishments of the regime. The Black Parade's ceremonial title is "His Grand Immortal Dictator's National Band", and the performance of the alter-ego is solely to appease the dictator. The production is intended to be a parody of political authoritarianism.

The band's logo for the tour is their acronym, "MCR", in Keposhka.

The band's vocalist Gerard Way commissioned typographer Nate Piekos to design a language for the tour, to serve as the language for Draag and to be used on merchandise. The language is known as Keposhka. It contains more letters than the standard English alphabet, while certain letter combinations will lead to the creation of unique symbols. The language features more of these symbols than standard letters. The language is utilized in multiple aspects of the tour, including being used for the washing instructions on tour merchandise. A total of fourteen different Keposhkan fonts were made by Piekos. Fan attempts to decipher the language resulted in the creation of online tools for translating English to Keposhka, as well as a version of Wordle featuring exclusively Keposhkan words.

=== Song adjustments and live debuts ===
For the main Black Parade set, My Chemical Romance made adjustments to multiple songs from the album. "Mama" received updated lyrics and an extension known as the "Dagger" section. Several songs received extended introductions and endings; "Sleep" and "Disenchanted" were both given extended introductions, titled "The Big Sky" and "The Button Pressed", respectively. A reprise version of "The End.", The Black Parade's opening track, was added to the end of the set and also features an extended ending. For the Latin America leg, the band added a reprise version of "Welcome to the Black Parade" to the end of "Famous Last Words" and created a new intro for "The Sharpest Lives", known as "The Eye".

Several songs were either played for the first time during Long Live, or for the first time in over a decade. During the B-stage set of the band's performance in San Francisco on July 19, they premiered a cover of the Smashing Pumpkins song "Bullet with Butterfly Wings". At the Chicago performance on August 29, Billy Corgan of Smashing Pumpkins joined them for another performance of "Bullet with Butterfly Wings" to close the show. They premiered a cover of Bon Jovi's "Livin' on a Prayer" on August 9 in East Rutherford, New Jersey. In their first night at Los Angeles on July 26, they played "War Beneath the Rain", a previously unreleased song recorded for The Paper Kingdom. The song was dedicated to the family of their past producer Doug McKean, who were attending the show. On July 8, 2026, during their first night at Wembley Stadium, My Chemical Romance performed a cover of Morrissey's "Jack the Ripper", for the first time since 2003. "Ambulance" was played live for the first time during the band's performance at Bellahouston Park in Glasgow, Scotland, on July 4. The tour also marked the first time that "To the End" and "My Way Home Is Through You" were played live since 2006 and 2008, respectively.

== Concert synopsis ==
=== Main shows ===
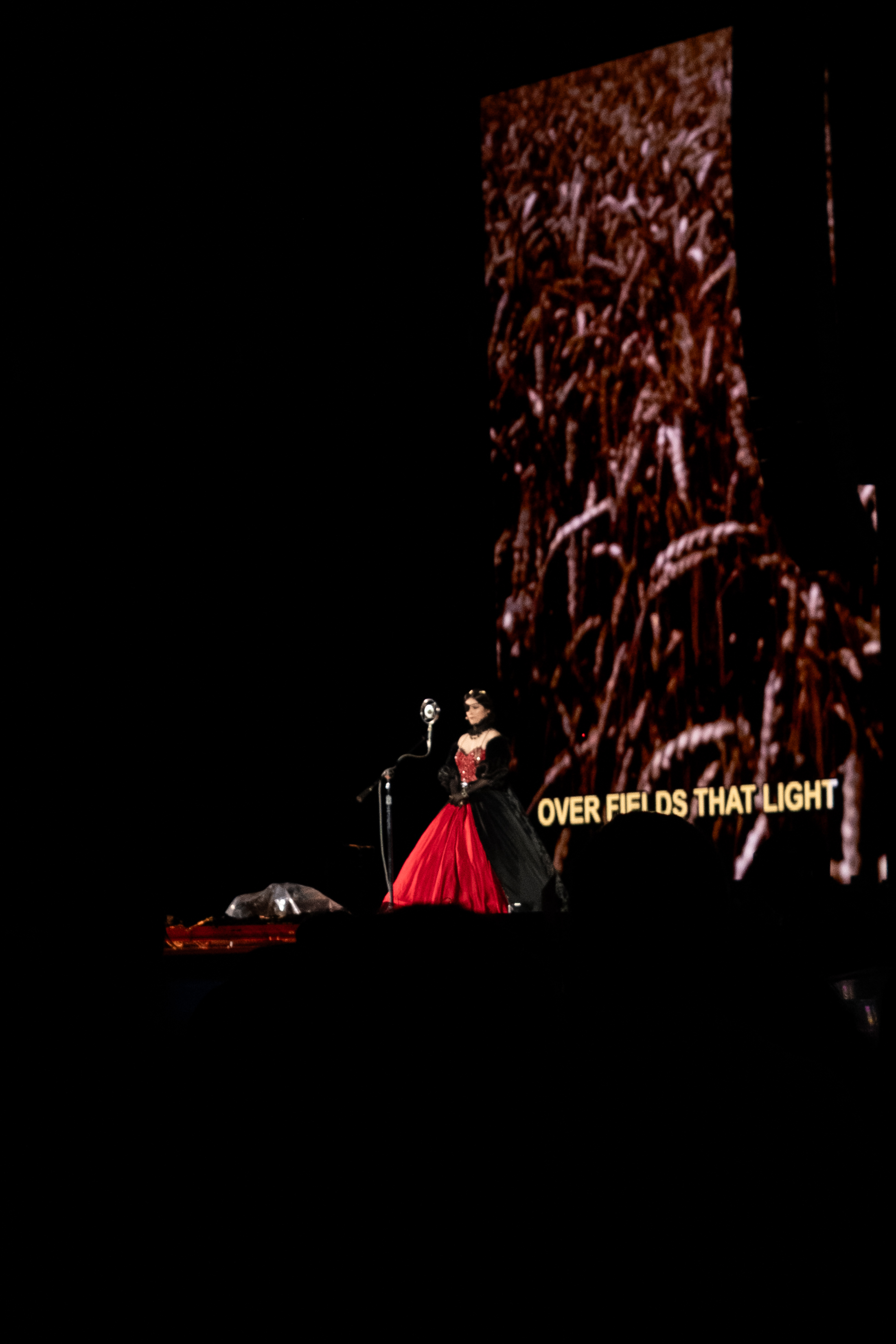
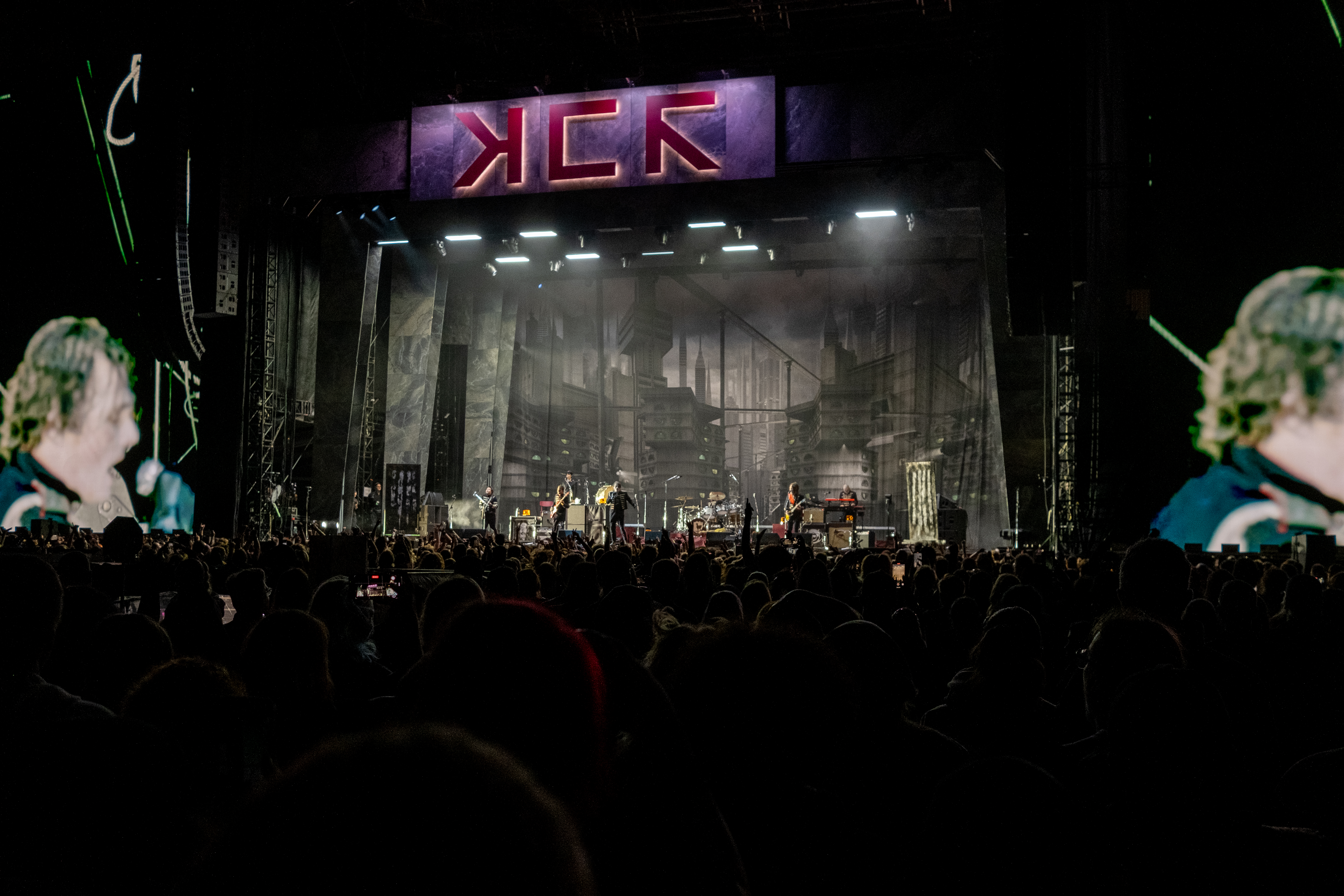
Shows of Long Live The Black Parade opened up with a guest opera singer performing the Draag national anthem, "Over Fields" (left), before the band walked on stage in their Black Parade uniforms (performance pictured right)

Before the show started, wanted posters and various mock "rules" appeared on the show screen; an example of one of the rules is "reading more than one has written is strictly prohibited". The 2025 shows started with a recording of "Tonight You Belong to Me" (1956) by American vocal duo Patience and Prudence, while in 2026, Vera Lynn's cover of "We'll Meet Again" (1953) played over the PA system. The show opened up with Marianne, the opera singer, performing the National Anthem of Draag, "Over Fields", and requesting the audience to partake in the performance.

The band then came out on stage in their Black Parade outfits and began performing The Black Parade in full, starting with "The End.", "Dead!", "This Is How I Disappear", and "The Sharpest Lives". In-between song performances there were short interactions between characters that progressed the tour's overarching story. Examples included Gerard Way's character receiving orders from other characters and being punished when refusing to comply, and introducing the Grand Immortal Dictator. These interactions also included localized ones specific to the city the show was taking place in, such as the band being given Dodger Dogs during their performances in Los Angeles, and them inviting the mayor of Belleville, New Jersey on stage in East Rutherford. Each show on the tour featured minor differences from the preceding one. In the last two stadium shows of the band's 2026 North America leg, the Grand Immortal Dictator was replaced. In San Diego, he was overthrown by his protégé, Veronika, while San Antonio, he was executed on stage by Gerard Way's character, who declared himself the new leader of Draag.

The album's centerpiece, "Welcome to the Black Parade", was contextualized in the show as a nationalist speech, delivered by Gerard Way from a podium and accompanied by footage of Draag propaganda. After the song, Way invited the audience to participate in a mock election. Prior to the show, attendees were handed voting cards for the election (which say "yea" and "nay"), (Note: During the Toronto show, the "yea" and "nay" signs were replaced by ones that said "chicken" and "fish", with chicken supplementing for "yea". For the Tampa show, the option to vote "nay" was removed, with signs only having "yea” as an option.) which were then used to vote on whether or not to execute four people. The execution then took place before the band continued performing the album, moving on to "I Don't Love You". The band continued to receive messages from the Clerk, while also expressing rebellion towards Draag, with Gerard Way at one point removing his Black Parade jacket after tearing up a message.

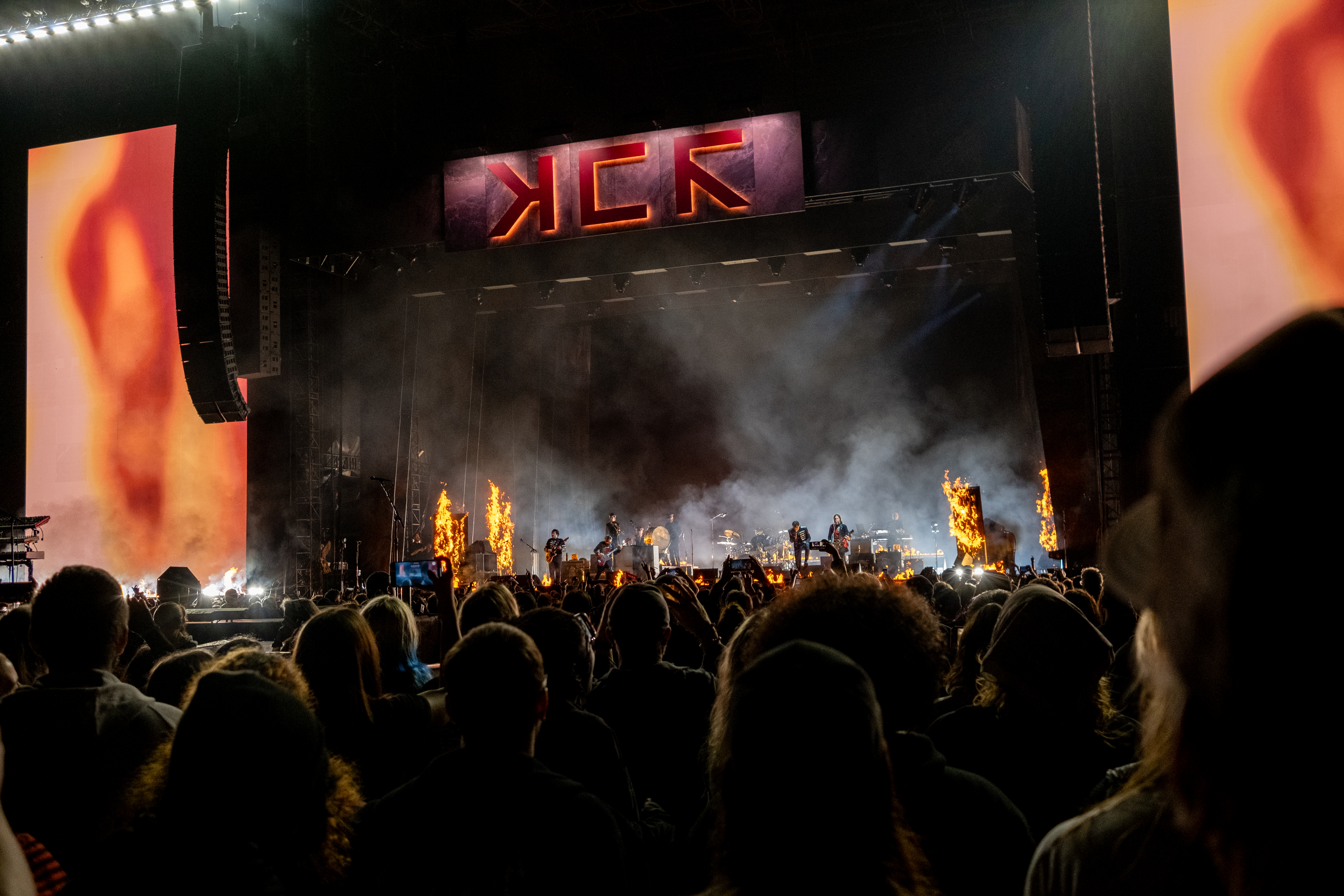
Pyrotechnics are utilized during the band's performance of "Famous Last Words" (pictured)

The latter part of the set simulated nuclear warfare against Draag. During the extended portion of "Mama", Gerard Way stole a dagger from one of the Dictator's servants, and described it as "a tool for our treasonous needs". The opera singer Marianne was also brought out to perform part of the song from the stadium's smaller B-stage. "Sleep" was accompanied by a simulation of Draag launching several nuclear missiles. For "Teenagers", the show screen was flashed with multiple advertisements related to in-universe products from Draag. "Disenchanted" was preceded by a video which addresses the audience regarding nuclear warfare; the Grand Immortal Dictator appeared on screen during the performance. The album's closing song, "Famous Last Words", utilized pyrotechnics as the stage erupted into flames.

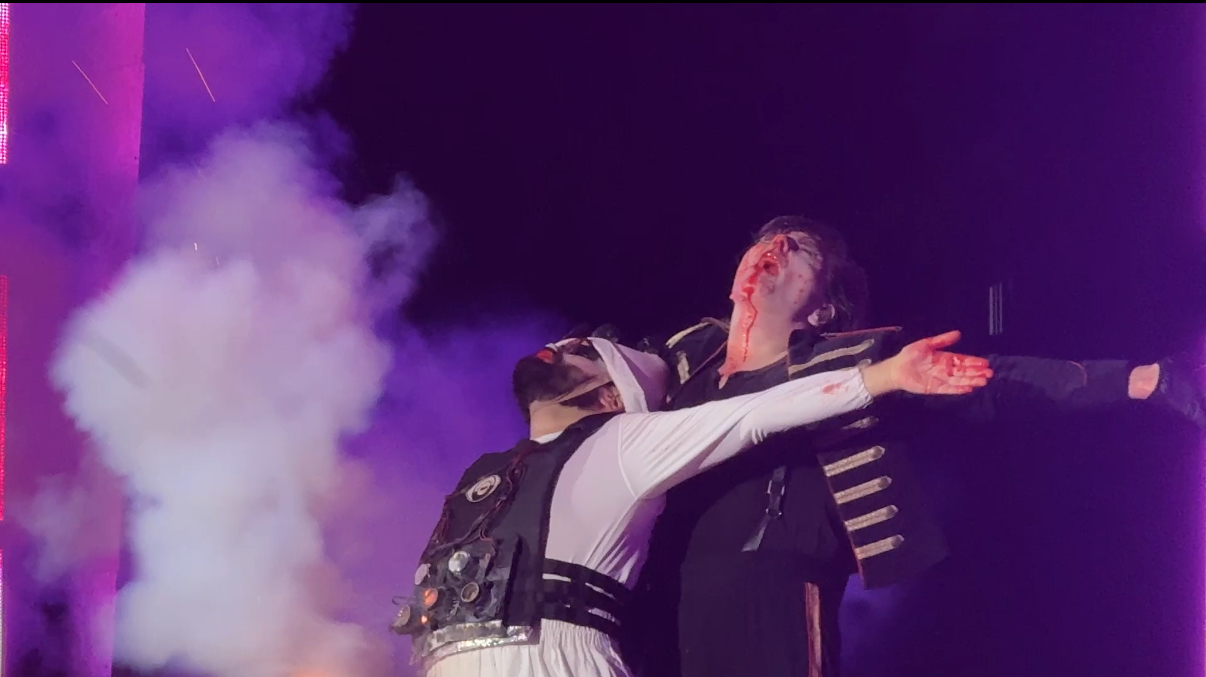
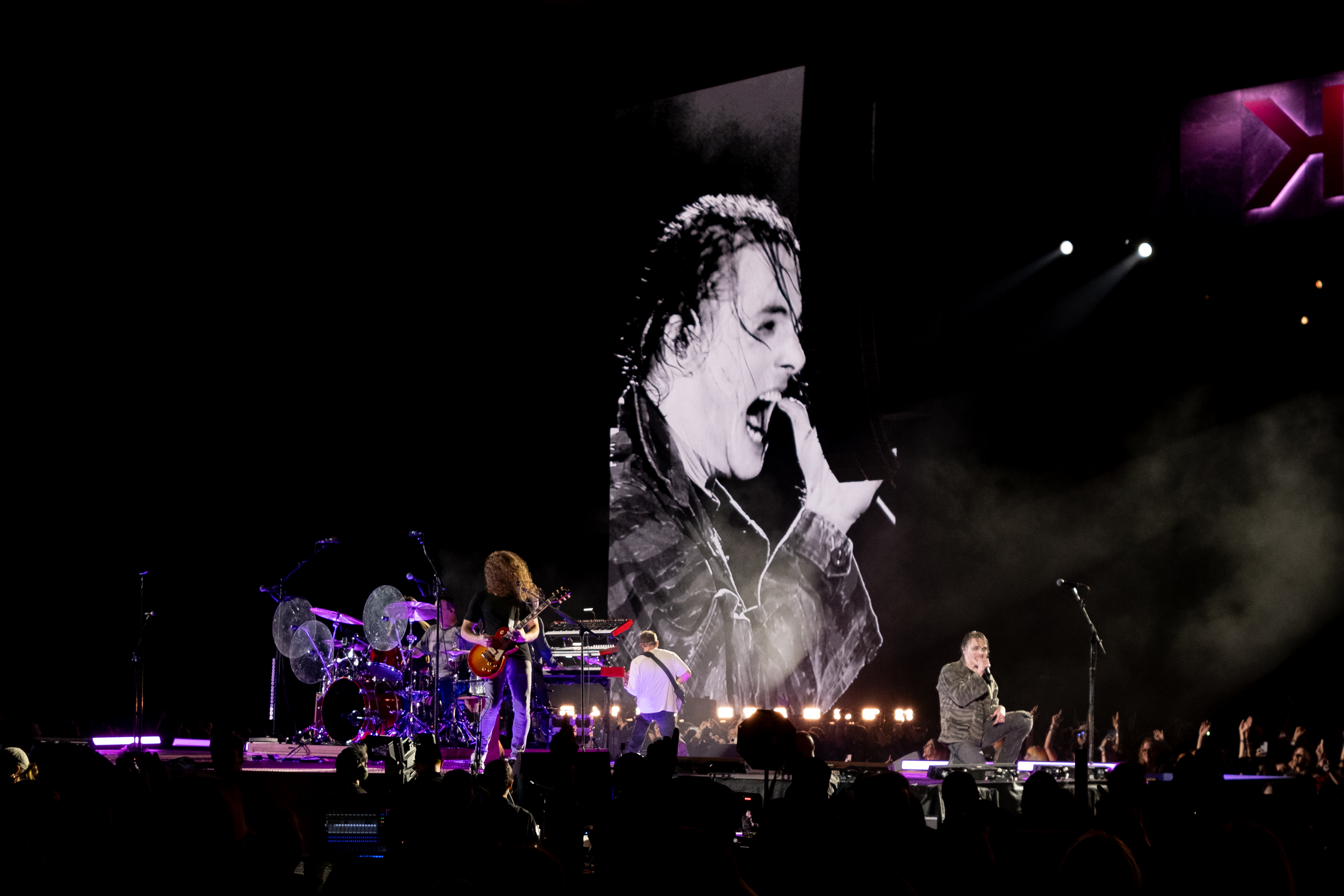
The main Black Parade set closed with the Pierrot (pictured left; center-image next to Gerard Way) setting off a bomb vest. The Black Parade is then followed by a shorter, more varied set list (performance pictured right).

At the end of the Black Parade set, the band performed a reprise version of "The End." Mid-way through the performance, the Clerk came on stage, now dressed up as a Pierrot, and stabbed Gerard Way's character in the throat. The rest of the band was then forcefully removed from the stage by Draag soldiers, except for Muhoberac, who was escorted off of the stage while holding a plane ticket. Afterwards, the Pierrot danced in victory to the album's hidden track "Blood". He later revealed a bomb vest underneath his costume, which detonated and closed the first set. For the intermission between the two sets, cellist Clarice Jensen played "From A to B". For the second set, the band removed their Black Parade costumes and went onto the B-stage to play an assortment of songs from the rest of their discography.

=== Prequel shows ===
In addition to the main shows, certain shows of the tour acted as a prequel to the main story, starting with the 2026 Latin American leg, where "Mr. Blue Sky" (1977) by the Electric Light Orchestra was used as an intro instead. These shows follow the Black Parade being held in the M.O.A.T., a prison-like government entity, where they are "reconditioned" to perform for the Grand Immortal Dictator. During these shows, the Black Parade outfits were closer to their ones from the original 2007 tour, rather than the redesigned ones. The same characters were present, but had altered designs and behavior. For example, the Clerk—who is originally depicted as an antagonist during the previous leg—was instead an institutionalized patient. Shows also ended with Gerard Way's character murdering the Clerk during "Blood", rather than vice-versa.

Other alterations included additional propaganda speeches before songs, the lack of mock executions, and updated visuals during "Teenagers" that depicted the set of a children's program rather than a game show. The second set of songs also takes place on the main stage rather than a separate B-stage. The leg being a prequel was revealed during its final night in Mexico City, where Gerard Way was handed his updated jacket from the 2025 leg.

=== Hollywood Bowl shows ===
The October 2026 dates at the Hollywood Bowl featured their own production separate from both the main shows and prequel shows. These shows are focused on a fictional conquest of the United States by Draag, known as the "United States of Draag". These shows open up a mockumentary on Draag's history, focused on the First Battle of Gubrick, with actors engaging in an on-stage gunfight. The fight is followed by Marianne performing the "United States of Draag National Anthem", while the Black Parade started playing in-front of a Draag flag waving in the background.

Between songs, Gerard Way gave a presentation about how the United States loved the Grand Immortal Dictator, and therefore made it very easy for Draag to conquer the country. He then presented all of the improvements that Draag made to American life under this regime, including alterations to national monuments such as the White House and Mount Rushmore, and the abolition of currency in favor of bartering. The presentation was followed by Way singing part of Woody Guthrie's "This Land Is Your Land". Similarly to the main shows, the latter part of the performance feature a nuclear missile, now an on-stage prop. Throughout the performances are also dancing segments featuring soldiers and cheerleaders, more gunfights, and an assassination by gunshot of the Grand Immortal Dictator. Similarly to the prequel shows, My Chemical Romance performs their selection of non-Black Parade songs on the main stage rather than a B-stage.

== Ticket sales ==
Tickets for the initial ten North American dates went on sale on November 15, 2024. Within a few hours, all tickets to each show had sold out, with 365,000 tickets sold in total. The prices of tickets sold for the concerts were noted by fans online as being exceptionally high, with some seats having starting prices of over US$700. It was widely speculated that the band had opted into Ticketmaster's dynamic pricing feature, which scales the prices of tickets based on their demand. Prices were further accelerated by bot accounts, which were used to automatically purchase tickets and resell them at artificially inflated prices. Some fans criticized the band directly for their handling of ticket sales and alleged use of dynamic pricing, while others debated whether the band willingly opted into the practice, if they were forced into it by Ticketmaster, or if the practice was in use at all. Tickets for the Mexico City dates went on sale on May 24, 2025, while London's went on sale on August 15.

== Commercial performance ==
The tour has grossed over $122,200,000, with a total attendance of over 812,900. It was the 28th highest-grossing concert tour of 2025. The first four dates of Long Live earned over $29,900,000, with a total attendance of 158,000. It was the eleventh highest-grossing tour of July 2025; their two shows in Los Angeles, in particular, became the twelfth highest-grossing concert dates of July 2025. In August 2025, the tour grossed over $42,200,000 with an attendance of 207,000. It was the sixth highest-grossing tour of that month. The two final non-festival dates of the initial North American leg in September grossed $16,400,000 with an attendance of 83,100. The three January 2026 dates grossed over $8,400,000 with an attendance of 94,900. The February dates grossed over $25,200,000, with an attendance of 270,000.

== Critical reception ==
Long Live The Black Parade received positive reviews from journalists. Lin Yang of The Michigan Daily labeled it the best concert she had ever been to, as a "piece of art, crafted with purpose and poignancy" rather than just a mere nostalgia tour for the album. Michael Rietmulder, writing for the Seattle Times declared that, if anything could be inferred from the performance, it was that the band could still put on an unforgettable show. Loudwire's Brian Rolli said that the tour cemented the band's status as one of the most significant rock bands in the past 20 years. Jonah Krueger of Consequence said that through its production, the band further established The Black Parade as of relevant as an album was it was when it first released. In an Alternative Press readers poll, Long Live was voted as the best concert tour of 2025; the magazine described the tour as a "one-of-a-kind performance" that elevated The Black Parade's concept and theatrics to that of a Broadway production.

Several writers praised the production of the tour and the establishment of a new narrative for The Black Parade. Writing for Paste, Tatiana Tenreyro praised the new narrative created for the tour, saying that Gerard Way managed to create a "both eerily real and absolutely absurd" fictional world, and that doing so for a tour rather than an album was a "next-level achievement". Dallas Observer's Austin Zook wrote that, despite the drab atmosphere of Draag, the show was never boring, and the setting worked with each song from The Black Parade. He further highlighted the adjustments that the band made to the album's songs, saying that they were "incredible" and "stay[ed] true to the spirit of the original work". The Hollywood Reporter's Nicole Fell praised the show's theatrics, and wrote that, while a show with The Black Parade played in full would've been successful regardless, the band dedicated themselves to storytelling and made the show the "perfect way to experience [The Black Parade]". Jake Harris of the Fort Worth Star-Telegram thought that, while the worldbuilding was impressive and immersive, the new narrative took away from the original album's concept about life and death, calling it a "touch-up on the album when it didn't need one".

Mikael Wood of the Los Angeles Times, while praising the theatrics, said that the most important part of the experience was how great The Black Parade's songs still were. Rolli said that The Black Parade's songs had still aged well after 20 years, and labeled the show as a "theatrical emo extravaganza". Rietmulder said that Gerard Way's performance during the Black Parade set captivated everyone in the crowd. Krueger wrote that, beyond the theatrics, the band's performance was both "well-rehearsed and energetic", and the energy carried over between both sets. Multiple critics praised the B-stage sets of the tour. Zook felt that, while less of a spectacle than the Black Parade set, the B-stage compensated with pure energy. Both Wood Rolli deemed the B-stage as the better part of the show; Rolli said that, while the Black Parade set was impressive, the B-stage contained the "biggest surprises and thrills". Marko Djurdjić of Exclaim! described the set as a "straight-up rock show", and "unadulterated ripping" with no theatrics or costumes.

Multiple critics commented on the authoritarian themes of the Black Parade set, with many interpreting it as an analogy of 2025's political landscape, which they viewed as increasingly authoritarian. Focusing on the show's new context for "Welcome to the Black Parade" as a nationalist speech, Yang interpreted it as calling for the audience to "reflect on [their] own role as both spectators and participants in an increasingly authoritarian and decreasingly democratic [United States], and how easily nationalism can obscure the degradation of democracy until it’s too late". She also believed that the execution vote was an analogy on deportations in the United States throughout 2025. Mikael Wood of the Los Angeles Times labeled the show as increasingly important in an era where he felt other popular artists were afraid to speak out politically out of fear of alienating their fans. Djurdjić believed that any potential message of the performance was muddied by its scale, and it was unclear whether it was an analogy of authoritarianism in the United States, or the Cold War. He believed that the visuals in particular were lackluster, which he described as attempting to cover several political ideologies like Communism and Nazism all at once, and that the usage of historical imagery made contemporary political commentary harder to understand.

== Sample set list ==
The following set list was performed at Globe Life Field in Arlington, Texas on August 2, 2025. It is not representative of all shows during the tour.

Act I: The Black Parade

1. "The End."
2. "Dead!"
3. "This Is How I Disappear"
4. "The Sharpest Lives"
5. "Welcome to the Black Parade"
6. "I Don't Love You"
7. "House of Wolves"
8. "Cancer"
9. "Mama"
10. "Sleep"
11. "Teenagers"
12. "Disenchanted"
13. "Famous Last Words"
14. "The End." (Reprise)
15. "Blood" (played from tape)
16. "From A to B" (intermission, performed by Clarice Jensen)

Act II: B-Stage

17. "Na Na Na (Na Na Na Na Na Na Na Na Na)"
18. "Our Lady of Sorrows"
19. "Planetary (Go!)"
20. "I'm Not Okay (I Promise)"
21. "Bullet with Butterfly Wings" (Smashing Pumpkins cover)
22. "The World Is Ugly"
23. "Thank You for the Venom"
24. "Kill All Your Friends"
25. "Helena"
26. "War Beneath the Rain"

== Tour dates ==
List of 2025 shows
Date	City	Country	Venue	Opening act(s)	Attendance (Note: A "—" indicates that no information regarding the shows attendance or revenue has been reported, the show has not happened yet, or it is inapplicable (e.g. a festival).)	Revenue
July 11	Seattle	United States	T-Mobile Park	Violent Femmes	36,500	$8,100,000
July 19	San Francisco	United States	Oracle Park	100 gecs	33,946	—
July 26	Los Angeles	United States	Dodger Stadium	Wallows	87,400	$15,000,000
July 27	Los Angeles	United States	Dodger Stadium	Wallows	87,400	$15,000,000
August 2	Arlington	United States	Globe Life Field	Garbage	38,246	—
August 9	East Rutherford	United States	MetLife Stadium	Death Cab for Cutie; Thursday	45,500	$9,300,000
August 15	Philadelphia	United States	Citizens Bank Park	Alice Cooper	—	—
August 22	Toronto	Canada	Rogers Centre	Pixies	—	—
August 29	Chicago	United States	Soldier Field	Devo	46,400	$10,700,000
September 7	Boston	United States	Fenway Park	Idles	—	—
September 13	Tampa	United States	Raymond James Stadium	Evanescence	—	—
September 20 (Note: Part of the 2025 Shaky Knees Music Festival.)	Atlanta	United States	Piedmont Park	—N/a	—N/a	—N/a

List of 2026 shows
Date	City	Country	Venue	Opening act(s)	Attendance	Revenue
January 25	Lima	Peru	National Stadium of Peru	The Hives	54,200	$5,200,000
January 28	Santiago	Chile	Estadio Bicentenario de La Florida	The Hives; Hvnvbi	40,700	$3,200,000
January 29	Santiago	Chile	Estadio Bicentenario de La Florida	The Hives; Hvnvbi	40,700	$3,200,000
February 1	Buenos Aires	Argentina	Estadio Huracán	The Hives	35,600	$3,500,000
February 5	São Paulo	Brazil	Allianz Parque	The Hives	75,100	$6,300,000
February 6	São Paulo	Brazil	Allianz Parque	The Hives	75,100	$6,300,000
February 10	Bogotá	Colombia	Vive Claro	The Hives	—	—
February 13	Mexico City	Mexico	Estadio GNP Seguros	The Hives	130,000	$12,200,000
February 14	Mexico City	Mexico	Estadio GNP Seguros	The Hives	130,000	$12,200,000
May 10 (Note: Part of the 2026 edition of Welcome to Rockville.)	Daytona Beach	United States	Daytona International Speedway	—N/a	—N/a	—N/a
May 14 (Note: Part of the 2026 edition of Sonic Temple.)	Columbus	United States	Historic Crew Stadium	—N/a	—N/a	—N/a
June 30	Liverpool	England	Anfield	Echo & The Bunnymen	—	—
July 4	Glasgow	Scotland	Bellahouston Park	Idlewild	—	—
July 8	London	England	Wembley Stadium	Skunk Anansie	—	—
July 10	London	England	Wembley Stadium	Joan Jett and the Blackhearts	—	—
July 11	London	England	Wembley Stadium	Sunny Day Real Estate; Anthony Green	—	—
July 15	Florence	Italy	Visarno Arena	Interpol	—	—
July 18	Madrid	Spain	Iberdrola Music	Mogwai	—	—
August 9	New York City	United States	Citi Field	Franz Ferdinand	—	—
August 13	Nashville	United States	Nissan Stadium	Pierce the Veil	—	—
August 18	Washington, D.C.	United States	Nationals Park	Modest Mouse	—	—
August 21	Detroit	United States	Comerica Park	Iggy Pop	—	—
August 24	Minneapolis	United States	Target Field	Sleater-Kinney	—	—
August 27	Denver	United States	Coors Field	The Breeders	—	—
August 30	San Diego	United States	Petco Park	Babymetal	—	—
September 6	Phoenix	United States	Chase Field	Jimmy Eat World	—	—
September 12	San Antonio	United States	Alamodome	The Mars Volta	—	—
September 18 (Note: Part of the 2026 edition of Louder Than Life.)	Louisville	United States	Highland Festival Grounds	—N/a	—N/a	—N/a
October 1 (Note: Part of the 2026 Aftershock Festival.)	Sacramento	United States	Discovery Park	—N/a	—N/a	—N/a
October 21	Los Angeles	United States	Hollywood Bowl	—	—	—
October 23	Los Angeles	United States	Hollywood Bowl	—	—	—
October 24	Los Angeles	United States	Hollywood Bowl	—	—	—
October 30	Los Angeles	United States	Hollywood Bowl	The Used	—	—
October 31	Los Angeles	United States	Hollywood Bowl	Thrice	—	—
November 7	Incheon	South Korea	Paradise City	—	—	—
November 10	Singapore		Singapore Indoor Stadium	—	—	—
November 11	Singapore		Singapore Indoor Stadium	—	—	—
November 14	Bocaue (Note: Labeled as Bulacan, the province where Bocaue is, or Manila in promotional material.)	Philippines	Philippine Arena	—	—	—
November 17	Pak Kret (Note: Labeled as Bangkok in promotional material.)	Thailand	Impact Challenger Hall 1	—	—	—
November 19	Kuala Lumpur	Malaysia	Bukit Jalil National Stadium	—	—	—
November 20	Kuala Lumpur	Malaysia	Bukit Jalil National Stadium	—	—	—
November 22	Jakarta	Indonesia	Jakarta International Stadium	—	—	—

== Personnel and cast ==
My Chemical Romance

- Frank Iero – rhythm guitar, backing vocals
- Ray Toro – lead guitar, backing vocals
- Gerard Way – lead vocals
- Mikey Way – bass

Additional musicians

- Jarrod Alexander – drums, percussion
- Kayleigh Goldsworthy – violin
- Clarice Jensen – cello
- Jamie Muhoberac – keyboards
- Tucker Rule – percussion

Actors

- Lucy Joy Altus – Marianne
- Wayne Jay – The Grand Immortal Dictator
- Charlotte Kelso – Sylvia
- Charlie Saxton – The Clerk
