= Jamie Muhoberac =

American keyboardist

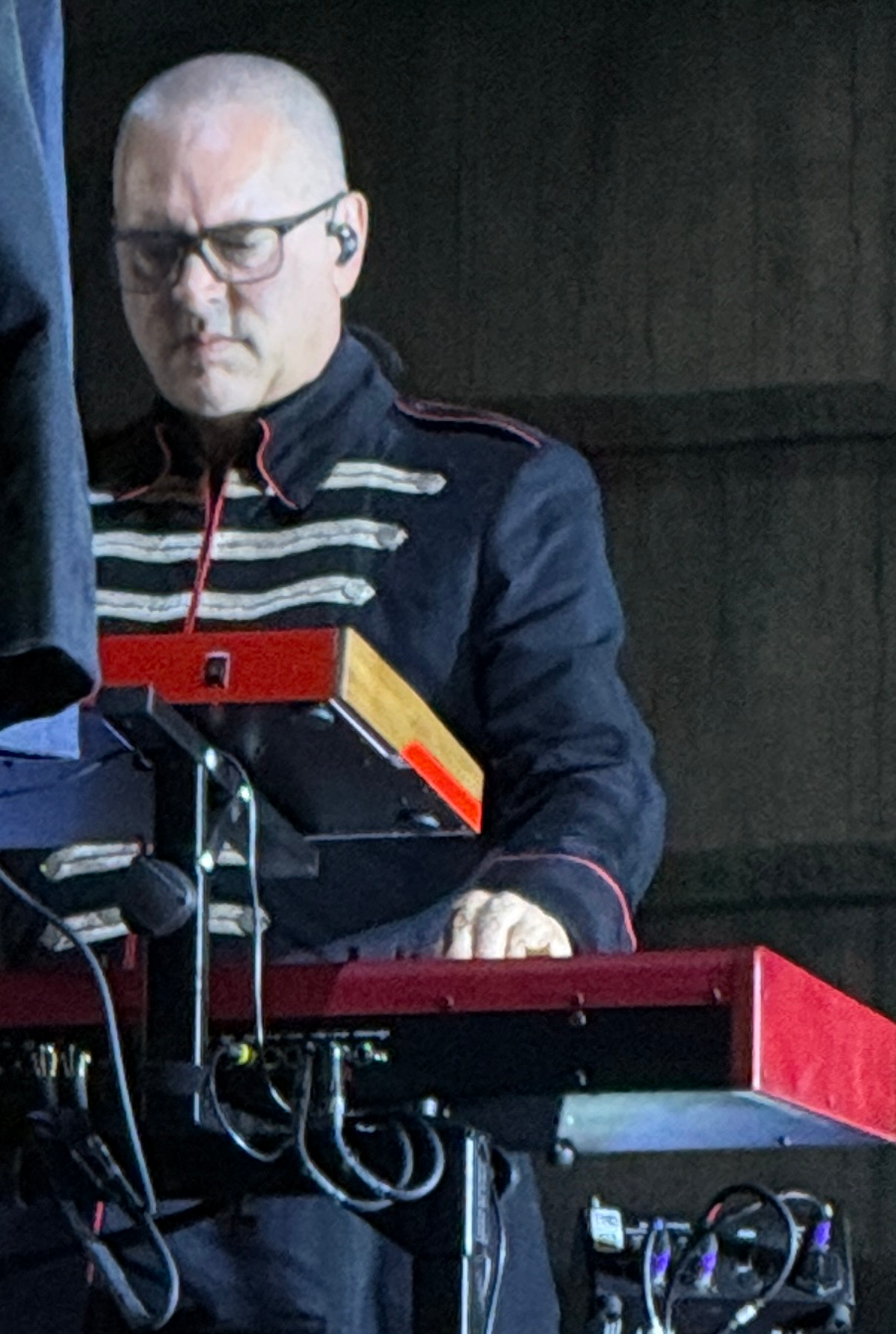
- Muhoberac in 2025

Background information
- Born: Benjamin Edward Muhoberac; September 11, 1965 (age 61); Dallas, Texas, U.S.
- Genres: Punk rock; pop-punk; emo; alternative rock; pop; country; dance-pop; synth-pop
- Occupations: Musician; composer
- Instrument: Keyboard
- Years active: 1990–present
- Member of: Was (Not Was)

Benjamin Edward "Jamie" Muhoberac (born September 11, 1965) is an American session keyboardist with numerous credits. He is best known for his work with Seal and Was (Not Was). He is a touring member with John Mayer and New Jersey rock band My Chemical Romance.

== Biography ==
Muhoberac has worked with acts including The All-American Rejects, Fleetwood Mac, Bob Dylan, The Rolling Stones, Backstreet Boys, Chris Cornell, Paradise Lost, Bowling For Soup, Eric Prydz, Genesis, Ofra Haza and Pet Shop Boys. He has often worked with producer Trevor Horn including for Seal and Rod Stewart. In recent years, he has worked with Jane's Addiction, Avenged Sevenfold, Sum 41, Joe Cocker, Phil Collins, John Mayer, Front Line Assembly, My Chemical Romance, Jon Hassell, Lasso, Tommy Henriksen, and John Sykes. Kid Harpoon said of him, "I know Jamie Muhoberac, he's one of the best keyboard players in the world and has played with everyone."

His first tour was with Was (Not Was). He was Seal's musical director in the 1990s.

He has had a writing partnership with Carmen Rizzo. They co-wrote Paul Oakenfold's 2002 single "Southern Sun", which reached #16 in the UK singles chart. They also co-wrote multiple songs on Delerium's 2003 album Chimera, including the single "Truly", which reached #54 in the UK.

He played live with John Doe in 2002. In 2019, he became the touring keyboardist for My Chemical Romance. In 2022, he also toured with John Mayer.

== Personal life ==
He lives in Los Angeles.

His father was pianist, producer, and arranger Larry Muhoberac, who worked with Barbra Streisand, Neil Diamond, Dean Martin, Elvis Presley, Silverchair, Sir John Rowles and numerous others. His brother is Parrish Muhoberac, a multi-instrumentalist musician, producer and performer.

== Discography ==
- Bob Dylan, Under the Red Sky, 1990 (certified Silver in the UK)
- Iggy Pop, Brick by Brick, 1990 (#50 in the UK, #34 in Germany, #13 in Switzerland)
- Paula Abdul, Spellbound, 1991 (#1 in the US, #4 in the UK)
- Seal, Seal, 1991 (#1 in the UK, #27 in the US)
- Mike Oldfield, Tubular Bells II, 1992 (#1 in the UK, #7 in Germany)
- Ringo Starr, Time Takes Time, 1992
- The B-52's, Good Stuff, 1992 (#8 in the UK, #16 in the US)
- Billy Idol, Cyberpunk, 1993 (#20 in the UK, #48 in the US)
- Khaled, "N'Sissi N'Sissi, 1993
- Seal, Seal, 1994 (#1 in the UK, #15 in the US)
- Tina Turner, Wildest Dreams, 1996 (#4 in the UK, #1 in New Zealand)
- The Rolling Stones, Bridges to Babylon, 1997 (#6 in the UK, #3 in the US, #1 in Germany)
- Goo Goo Dolls, Dizzy Up the Girl, 1998
- Seal, Human Being, 1998
- Chocolate Genius, Black Music, 1998
- John Sykes, Nuclear Cowboy, 1998
- Jon Hassell, Fascinoma, 1999
- various artists, The Million Dollar Hotel: Music from the Motion Picture, 2000
- Paul Oakenfold, Bunkka, 2002
- Alanis Morissette, Under Rug Swept, 2002 (#1 in the US and Italy, #2 in the UK)
- Goo Goo Dolls, Gutterflower, 2002
- Faith Hill, Cry, 2002 (#1 in the US, #2 in Australia)
- Michelle Branch, Hotel Paper, 2003 (#2 in the US, #4 in New Zealand)
- Seal, Seal IV, 2003 (#4 in the UK, #3 in the US, #1 in Switzerland)
- Melissa Etheridge, Lucky, 2004 (#15 in the US)
- Alanis Morissette, So-Called Chaos, 2004 (#5 in the US, #8 in the UK, #1 in Germany)
- Pet Shop Boys, Fundamental, 2006 (#5 in the UK, #4 in Germany)
- My Chemical Romance, The Black Parade, 2006
- Avenged Sevenfold, Avenged Sevenfold, 2007
- Gavin Rossdale, Wanderlust, 2008 (#40 in Austria)
- Escala, Escala, 2009 (#2 in the UK)
- John Legend, Evolver, 2009 (#4 in the US)
- Jon Hassell, Last Night the Moon Came Dropping Its Clothes in the Street, 2009
- Meat Loaf, Hang Cool Teddy Bear, 2010, co-wrote "Song of Madness" (#4 in the UK, #27 in the US)
- My Chemical Romance, Danger Days: The True Lives of the Fabulous Killjoys, 2010
- Taylor Swift, Red, 2012 (#1 in the US, UK, Canada, Australia, New Zealand)
- Florence K, I'm Leaving You, 2013
- Seal, 7, 2015 (#13 in the UK)
- Josh Groban, All That Echoes, 2016
- Beth Hart, A Tribute to Led Zeppelin, 2022 (#17 in the UK)
- My Chemical Romance, The Foundations of Decay, 2022
- Goo Goo Dolls, Chaos in Bloom, 2022
- Trevor Horn, Echoes: Ancient and Modern, 2023
- The Offspring, Supercharged, 2024

== Filmography ==
- Fetishes, 1996: music composer
- The Million Dollar Hotel, 2000
- Brother Bear, 2003: performer
- Rent, 2005: keys
- Sarah Palin: You Betcha!, 2011: music composer
