= Mikey Way =

American bassist (born 1980)

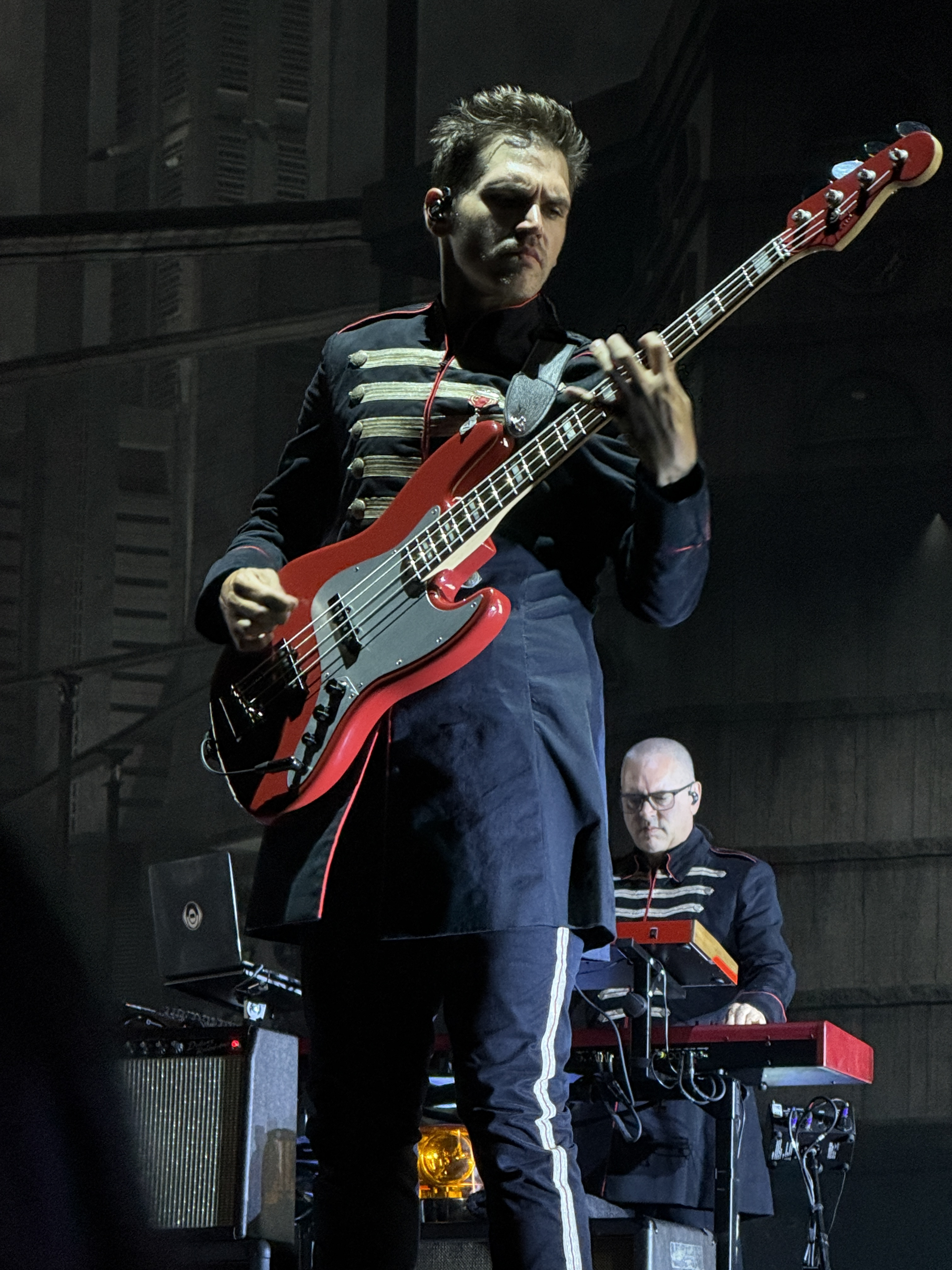
- Way performing in 2025
- Born: Michael James Way; September 10, 1980 (age 46); Newark, New Jersey, U.S.
- Occupations: Musician; songwriter
- Years active: 2001–present
- Spouses: Alicia Simmons (m. 2007; div. 2013) Kristin Blanford (m. 2016)
- Children: 2
- Relatives: Gerard Way (brother)
- Musical career
- Origin: Belleville, New Jersey, U.S.
- Genres: Alternative rock; pop-punk; post-hardcore; emo; punk rock; electropop; hard rock
- Instrument: Bass guitar
- Member of: My Chemical Romance; Electric Century

Michael James Way (born September 10, 1980) is an American musician, best known as the bassist of the rock band My Chemical Romance. He also serves as the multi-instrumentalist and backing vocalist of rock duo Electric Century. Way co-wrote Collapser with Shaun Simon; it was released in July 2019 on DC Comics. In 2024, Way cowrote Christmas 365 with Jonathan Rivera, published under Dark Horse Comics.

== Early life ==
Michael James Way was born on September 10, 1980, in Newark, New Jersey, to Donna Lee Way (née Rush) and Donald Way and is of Scottish and Italian ancestry. He was raised in Belleville, New Jersey, alongside his older brother Gerard. Growing up, he worked in a Barnes & Noble and later Eyeball Records. Both of these played a major part in the formation of My Chemical Romance. Eyeball signed the band and released their debut record.

The first concert he ever went to was a Smashing Pumpkins concert with his brother. After seeing them perform, Mikey told his brother that "we have to do this." He was asked to join My Chemical Romance, which involved him having to improve his bass skills in the space of a week.

== Music ==
=== My Chemical Romance ===
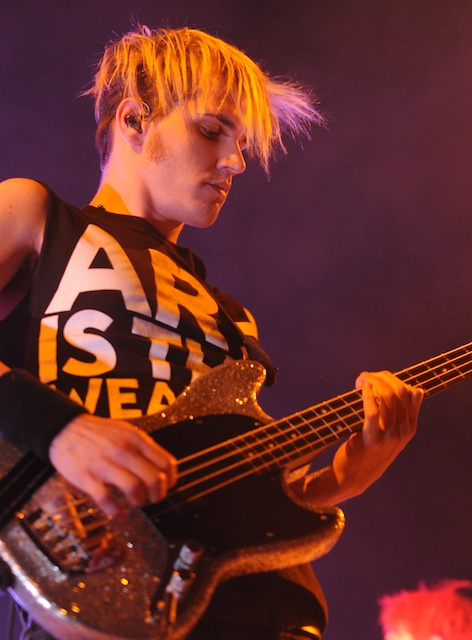
Way performing in 2011

Way joined American rock band My Chemical Romance in 2001 as their bassist and suggested the band's name after he read the book Ecstasy: Three Tales of Chemical Romance. When Way joined the band, he had to improve his bass skills in less than a week. My Chemical Romance released their second album Three Cheers for Sweet Revenge on June 8, 2004. My Chemical Romance's third album, The Black Parade, was released on October 24, 2006. My Chemical Romance released their fourth and final studio album, Danger Days: The True Lives of the Fabulous Killjoys, on November 22, 2010. While touring for the album, Way collaborated with Squier to release a signature Mikey Way Fender Mustang Bass. In an interview with MusicRadar, Way commented on his signature bass: "I had been sponsored by Fender through most of my time in MCR. I had contacted them about making a custom bass and they hit me back saying they wanted to give me a signature model". The band announced their breakup on March 22, 2013.

On October 31, 2019, My Chemical Romance announced they would be reuniting with a date in Los Angeles on December 20 and a new merchandise line. They later announced a 2020 North American tour, as well as dates in Australia, New Zealand, and Japan. The tour was later postponed to 2022 due to the COVID-19 pandemic. The Reunion Tour had its final show in Osaka, Japan, on March 26, 2023.

My Chemical Romance headlined the 2024 When We Were Young Festival, where they played The Black Parade in its entirety. Approximately a month following the festival date, on November 12, 2024, My Chemical Romance announced their Long Live the Black Parade Tour of the United States. The tour began on July 11, 2025, in Seattle, Washington, and the first leg ended on September 20, 2025, at the Shaky Knees Festival in Atlanta, Georgia.

=== Electric Century ===
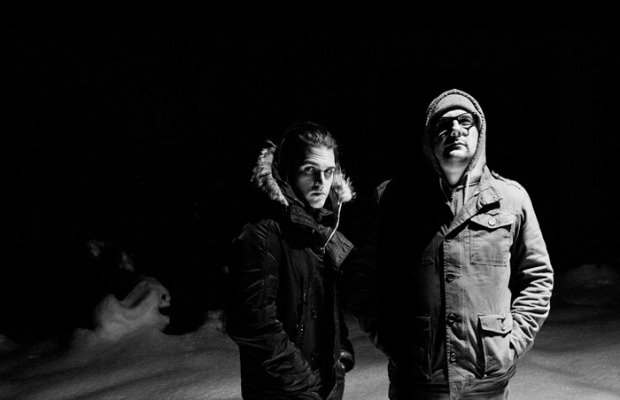
Electric Century consists of Way (left) and Dave Debiak (right)

For over a year after the break up of My Chemical Romance, Way remained without a band until he formed Electric Century with Sleep Station vocalist David Debiak. The duo released their first song "I Lied" in February 2014. The same month, Electric Century was included in Alternative Press's "100 Bands You Need To Know" list. The magazine mentioned that "I Lied" "forges an alloy of decades-proven electronic pop" comparing it to fun. and Twenty One Pilots. Alternative Press also said that the duo's album was finished and awaiting release later that year. The album was recorded and mixed by D. James Goodwin at The Isokon Studio in Woodstock, New York. In November, Way revealed that he had flown in February to the East Coast to complete the album but instead went to rehab. Way also said the news about Electric Century would be "in the coming months." On January 13, 2015, "Let You Get Away" was made available for streaming. "Let You Get Away" was released as a single on April 3. The band announced their debut self-titled EP on March 10, and was released on Record Store Day on April 18. "Hail the Saints" and "Right There" were released as singles on May 6.

Since releasing their debut EP, the band re-entered the studio, and spent much 2015 writing and recording new songs. In January 2016, the duo tweeted on their official Twitter page "2016 is THE year", hinting upcoming releases. They announced their debut album For the Night to Control on February 24, 2016, and was released on March 9, exclusively with that week's edition of Kerrang! Magazine. The album was officially released on July 14, 2017. Their self-titled second studio album, produced by My Chemical Romance bandmate Ray Toro, was released February 26, 2021.

=== Other musical collaborations ===
Way toured with From First to Last in 2005 following the departure of the band's bassist Jon Weisburg. In November 2015, Way was featured in Good Charlotte's music video for their first single since their hiatus, "Makeshift Love". He also contributed to Andy Black's debut solo album The Shadow Side, a pseudonym project from Black Veil Brides frontman Andy Biersack. Way recorded bass for American pop punk band Waterparks on their Cluster EP, and later joined them on tour with Good Charlotte, including performances at Reading and Leeds festivals. Way was also a special guest DJ at Emo Nite LA's 1st-year anniversary.

== Acting ==
In 2013, Way made his acting debut on The Hub original series The Aquabats! Super Show! in the season two finale "The AntiBats!", playing the lead singer of a fictional death metal band called Asthma. Additionally, Way's brother Gerard co-directed and co-wrote the episode. In 2018, Way debuted as a voice actor by voicing the role of Snarl in the Transformers: Power of the Primes animated series.

== Personal life ==
In March 2007, Way married his first wife, Alicia Simmons. They divorced in 2013.

In 2015, his brother revealed on Reddit that he was a second cousin of popular podcaster Joe Rogan. In October 2019, Rogan confirmed it on his podcast. He also said that despite this, the two have never met.

In February 2016, Way married Kristin Blanford, the ex-wife of The Calling lead-vocalist Alex Band. Together, they have two daughters, born in 2017 and 2019.

Way has spoken openly about his struggles with addiction and sobriety. He has been sober since 2014, after entering rehab following an intervention.

== Discography ==
My Chemical Romance

- I Brought You My Bullets, You Brought Me Your Love (2002)
- Three Cheers for Sweet Revenge (2004)
- The Black Parade (2006)
- Danger Days: The True Lives of the Fabulous Killjoys (2010)

Electric Century

- Electric Century (2015), EP
- For the Night to Control (2016)
- Electric Century (2021)

Guest performances

- The Shadow Side (by Andy Black, 2016)
- Cluster (by Waterparks, 2016)

== Bibliography ==
Story credits

- Collapser (co-written with Shaun Simon, art by Ilias Kyriazis, DC Comics, 2019–present)
- Christmas 365 (co-written with Jonathan Rivera, art by Piotr Kowalski, Dark Horse Comics, Dec. 2024 - Mar. 2025)
