= Gerard Way discography =

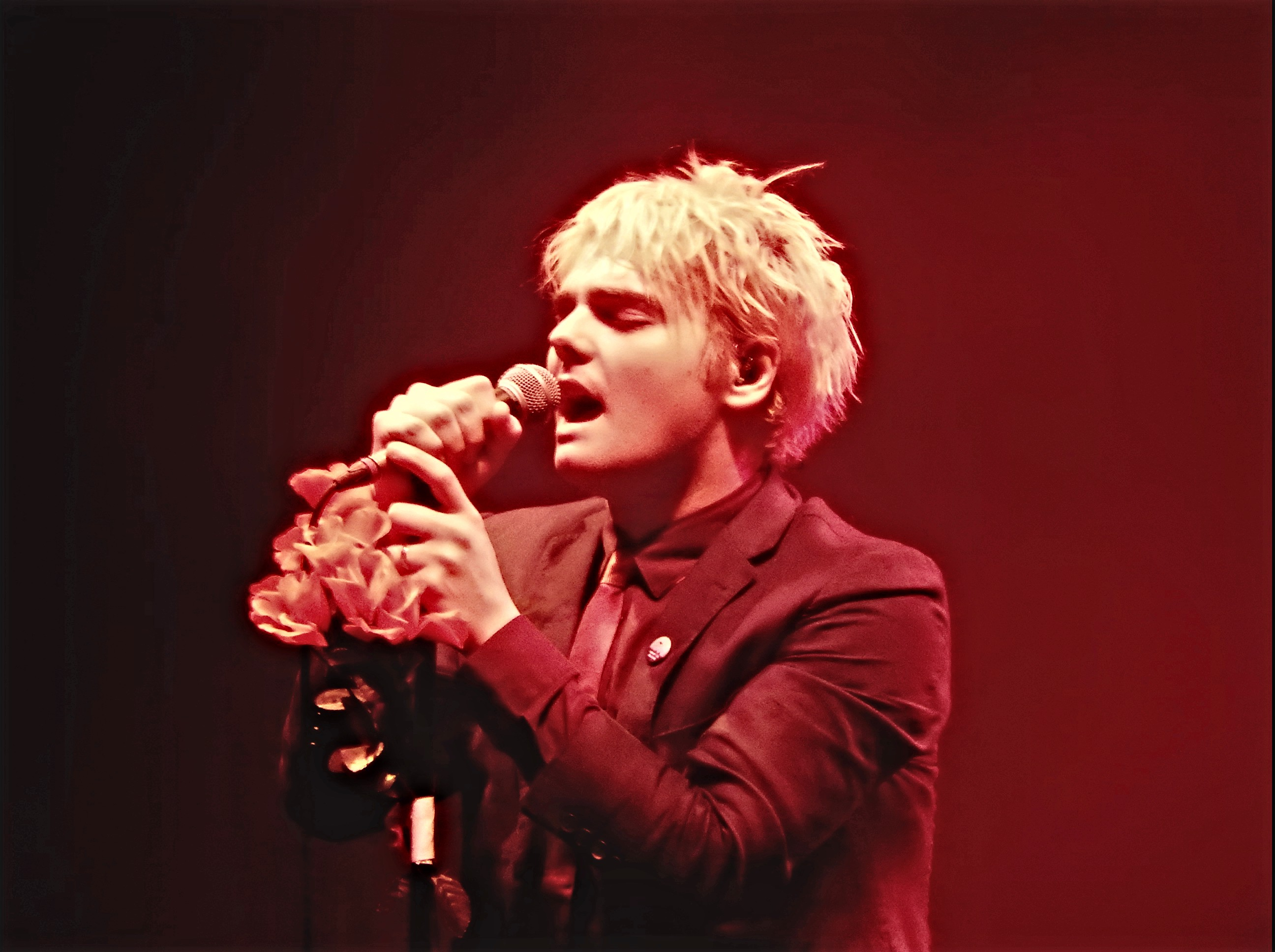
- Way performing in Southampton Guildhall in January 2015
- Studio albums: 1
- Singles: 10
- Promotional singles: 1
- Music videos: 2

As a solo artist, American singer Gerard Way has released one studio album, ten singles, and one promotional single. He started his solo career after the disbandment of his previous band, My Chemical Romance, in 2013.

His debut album, Hesitant Alien, was released on September 29, 2014. The album drew influence from Britpop and shoegaze music, and bands such as Pulp, Blur, David Bowie, Morrissey and Pixies. Two singles from the record were released: "No Shows" and "Millions". He also released "Action Cat" digitally as a promotional single prior to the album's release. Hesitant Alien charted in multiple countries, reaching number 14 on the UK Albums Chart and number 16 on the Billboard 200. In 2016, he released the songs "Pinkish" and "Don't Try", which he described as the end of the promotional campaign for Hesitant Alien.

Later in 2016, Way and My Chemical Romance bandmate Ray Toro wrote and recorded the song "Into the Cave We Wander", which was initially released exclusively on a cassette given away at the 2016 New York Comic Con before receiving an extended release in 2017. In 2018, Way released three singles, starting with "Baby You're a Haunted House" in October, which has been described as power pop and punk rock. It reached number 34 on the Billboard Hot Rock & Alternative Songs chart. The indie rock track "Getting Down the Germs" followed in November, which was also written with Toro. "Dasher", a Christmas song featuring Lydia Night, was released in December.

In February 2019, The Umbrella Academy, a television show based on Way's comic book series The Umbrella Academy, premiered on Netflix. For the trailer of its first season, Way and Toro recorded a cover of Simon & Garfunkel's "A Hazy Shade of Winter" (1966). Way and Toro also recorded a cover of the Turtles single "Happy Together", which is used in the show. My Chemical Romance reunited in December of that same year. In 2020, Way collaborated with Judith Hill for "Here Comes the End", written for The Umbrella Academy's second season. He also released four unfinished songs under the collective title of Distraction or Despair. Outside of his main discography, Way has also appeared on singles released by Deadmau5, Ibaraki, and Frozen Soul.

== Albums ==
=== Studio albums ===
List of studio albums, with selected details and chart positions
Title	Details	Peak chart positions					
Title	Details	US	AUS	IRE	NZ	SCO	UK
Hesitant Alien	Released: September 29, 2014; Label: Reprise; Formats: CD, digital download	16	29	17	37	13	14

== Singles ==
=== As lead artist ===
List of singles with a selection of chart positions
Title	Year	Peak chart positions			Album
Title	Year	US Rock /Alt	MEX Air	SCO	Album
"No Shows"	2014	— (Note: "No Shows" did not enter the Hot Rock & Alternative Songs chart, but peaked at number 42 on the Rock Digital Song Sales chart.)	45	—	Hesitant Alien
"Millions"	2014	—	—	—	Hesitant Alien
"Pinkish" / "Don't Try"	2016	—	—	—	Non-album singles
"Into the Cave We Wander"	2016	—	—	—	Non-album singles
"Baby You're a Haunted House"	2018	34	—	—	Non-album singles
"Getting Down the Germs"	2018	—	—	—	Non-album singles
"Dasher" (featuring Lydia Night)	2018	—	—	—	Non-album singles
"A Hazy Shade of Winter" (featuring Ray Toro)	2019	— (Note: "A Hazy Shade of Winter" did not enter the Hot Rock & Alternative Songs chart, but peaked at number 20 on the Alternative Digital Song Sales chart.)	—	76	Non-album singles
"Happy Together" (featuring Ray Toro)	2019	—	—	—	Non-album singles
"Here Comes the End" (featuring Judith Hill)	2020	—	—	—	Non-album singles
"—" denotes single that did not chart or was not released.

==== Promotional singles ====
List of promotional singles
Title	Year	Album
"Action Cat" (Note: Despite "Action Cat" being the first song Way released, he said that the song was not released for radio and was simply a "taster" for Hesitant Alien.)	2014	Hesitant Alien

=== As featured artist ===
List of singles with a selection of chart positions
Title	Year	Peak chart positions								Album
Title	Year	US Dance Air	CAN	US Dance	UK	JPN	US Dig	CAN Dig	BEL	Album
"Professional Griefers" (Deadmau5 featuring Gerard Way)	2012	22	66	30	81	77	13	52	74	Album Title Goes Here
"Rōnin" (Ibaraki featuring Gerard Way and Ihsahn)	2022	—	—	—	—	—	—	—	—	Rashomon
"No Place of Warmth" (Frozen Soul featuring Gerard Way)	2026	—	—	—	—	—	—	—	—	No Place of Warmth

== Music videos ==
List of music videos
Title	Year	Director(s)
"No Shows"	2014	Jennifer Juniper Stratford
"Millions"	2014	Jennifer Juniper Stratford
