= Shapes of Screams =

Studio album by LostAlone
- Released: 7 April 2014
- Recorded: 2013
- Genre: Progressive rock, post-hardcore, pop punk, rock
- Length: 44:00
- Label: Graphite Records
- Producer: Dan Weller

LostAlone chronology
I'm a UFO in This City (2012)	Shapes of Screams (2014)

Singles from Shapes of Screams
- 1. "The Bells! The Bells!!" Released: 11 November 2013; 2. "Scarlet Letter Rhymes" Released: 5 March 2014

Shapes of Screams is the third studio album by the British rock band LostAlone released on 7 April 2014 on Graphite Records.

== Release and promotion ==
Shapes of Screams was first previewed to fans at the Victoria Inn, Derby on 7 July 2013. LostAlone released the album's first single and music video, "The Bells! The Bells!" on 11 November 2013 as a free download. The album's title and release date was officially announced on 13 February 2014, alongside a headline UK tour in April.

"Shapes Of Screams is an album filled with first-kiss adrenaline, heart bursting happiness, life-affirming air-guitar moments and demented genius that will leave you delighted for hearing it" 5/5 Kerrang!

"That LostAlone aren’t Bon Jovi-massive yet is a source of consternation.” NME

"A fearless and absorbing work, it’s likely to be the finest rock album you’ll hear this year.” The Digital Fix

“Shapes Of Screams proves a continuation of their non-existent sonic boundaries.” Indulge Sound

"LostAlone continue their quest to resurrect epic, almost ridiculousl, grand rock on album three.” Total Guitar

"If I could only make one bold proclamation about music this year, it is this: LostAlone are the most underrated band in the world. Of all time" Alternative Press

== Track listing ==
All tracks are written by Steven Battelle.

No.	Title	Length
1.	"Crusaders"	4:58
2.	"The Bells! The Bells!!"	4:13
3.	"Hostages (Destiny)"	3:40
4.	"Sombre Party (Legacy)"	2:58
5.	"G.U.I.L.T.Y"	3:36
6.	"Mental Health"	4:10
7.	"Apathy"	3:01
8.	"Scarlet Letter Rhymes"	3:48
9.	"I Was Born To End This Way"	3:22
10.	"Requiem"	3:53
11.	"Doooooooooomageddon (Global Thermonuclear Metafictional Warfare)"	3:35
12.	"Breathing In the Future Exhaling the Past"	2:46
Total length:		44:00

iTunes Bonus Track Version
No.	Title	Length
13.	"Method To My Madness"	3:57

== Personnel ==
LostAlone

- Steven Battelle — Lead Vocals / Guitar
- Alan Williamson — Bass / Backing Vocals
- Mark Gibson — Drums / Backing Vocals

Production personnel

Produced by Dan Weller

Mixed by Adam Noble

Mastered by Dick Beetham

Artwork by Jim Cork

Gospel choir on Requiem - Urban Voice Collective.
