= I'm a UFO in This City =

Studio album by LostAlone
- Released: 5 March 2012
- Recorded: Los Angeles
- Genre: Rock, post-hardcore, progressive rock
- Length: 44:33
- Label: Graphite Records
- Producer: Jacknife Lee, Greg Wells, Gerard Way

LostAlone chronology
Say No to the World (2007)	I'm a UFO in This City (2012)	Shapes of Screams (2014)

Singles from I'm a UFO in This City
- 1. "Do You Get What You Pray For?" Released: 5 February 2012; 2. "Love Will Eat You Alive" Released: 1 April 2012; 3. "Paradox on Earth" Released: 10 June 2012; 4. "Vesuvius" Released: 5 November 2012; 5. "Creatures" Released: 5 November 2012

Professional ratings
Review scores
Source	Rating
Our Zone	10/10 stars
NME	8/10 stars
This Is Fake DIY	8/10 stars
Rock Sound	7/10 stars
Female First	5/5 stars
Hit The Floor Magazine	8/10 stars
Alt Sounds	8.4/10 stars
Uberrock	Favourable

I'm a UFO in This City is the second studio album by British rock band LostAlone, released on 5 March 2012 in the United Kingdom and on 4 March 2012 as a digital release.

== Release and promotion ==
LostAlone announced the name of a new track, "Paradox on Earth", from their forthcoming album on 13 February 2011 and offered it as a free download. The album was officially announced in 2011 with the title "I'm a UFO in This City". The first single was announced on 15 September 2011, entitled "Do You Get What You Pray For?" with release on 5 February 2012. I'm a UFO in This City was first previewed to a select few fans at a Christmas homeshow at The Victoria Inn, Derby on 22 December 2011 before LostAlone played their final show of 2011. The second single entitled "Love Will Eat You Alive" had its video premiered on NME on 27 February 2012 and was released on 1 April 2012.

== Track listing ==
- All music by Steven Battelle. "Obey the Rules", "Love Will Eat You Alive" and "Paradox on Earth" produced by Jacknife Lee, all other tracks produced by Greg Wells.

No.	Title	Length
1.	"Obey the Rules You Lose"	1:39
2.	"Love Will Eat You Alive"	3:32
3.	"Paradox on Earth"	3:07
4.	"UFOria (The Dark)"	3:41
5.	"Vesuvius"	5:52
6.	"Creatures"	3:08
7.	"Orchestra of Breathing"	4:38
8.	"Put Pain to Paper"	4:12
9.	"Do You Get What You Pray For?"	4:16
10.	"We Are the Archaeology of the Futures Past"	4:16
11.	"The Downside of Heaven Is the Upside of Hell"	6:12
Total length:		44:33

iTunes Store Bonus Edition (United States)
No.	Title	Length
12.	"Nothing Else Matters"	6:00
13.	"Two Out of Three Ain't Bad"	5:20

iTunes Store Bonus Edition (United Kingdom)
No.	Title	Length
12.	"Sin and Sinners"	4:16
13.	"History Romanticises Traitors"	4:02
14.	"Escape"	3:06
15.	"Dead Men Walking"	3:01
16.	"Do You Get What You Pray For?" (video)
17.	"Love Will Eat You Alive" (video)

Bonus DVD
No.	Title	Length
1.	"5354.9 Miles from Home: The Making of I'm a UFO in This City"

== Personnel ==
LostAlone

- Steven Battelle — lead vocals, piano, lyrics, guitar
- Alan Williamson — bass, backing vocals
- Mark Gibson — drums, percussion, backing vocals

Production personnel

- Jacknife Lee - producer
- Greg Wells - producer
- Gerard Way - executive producer
- Alan Moulder - engineer
- Mark Needham - engineer
