= LostAlone =

British rock band

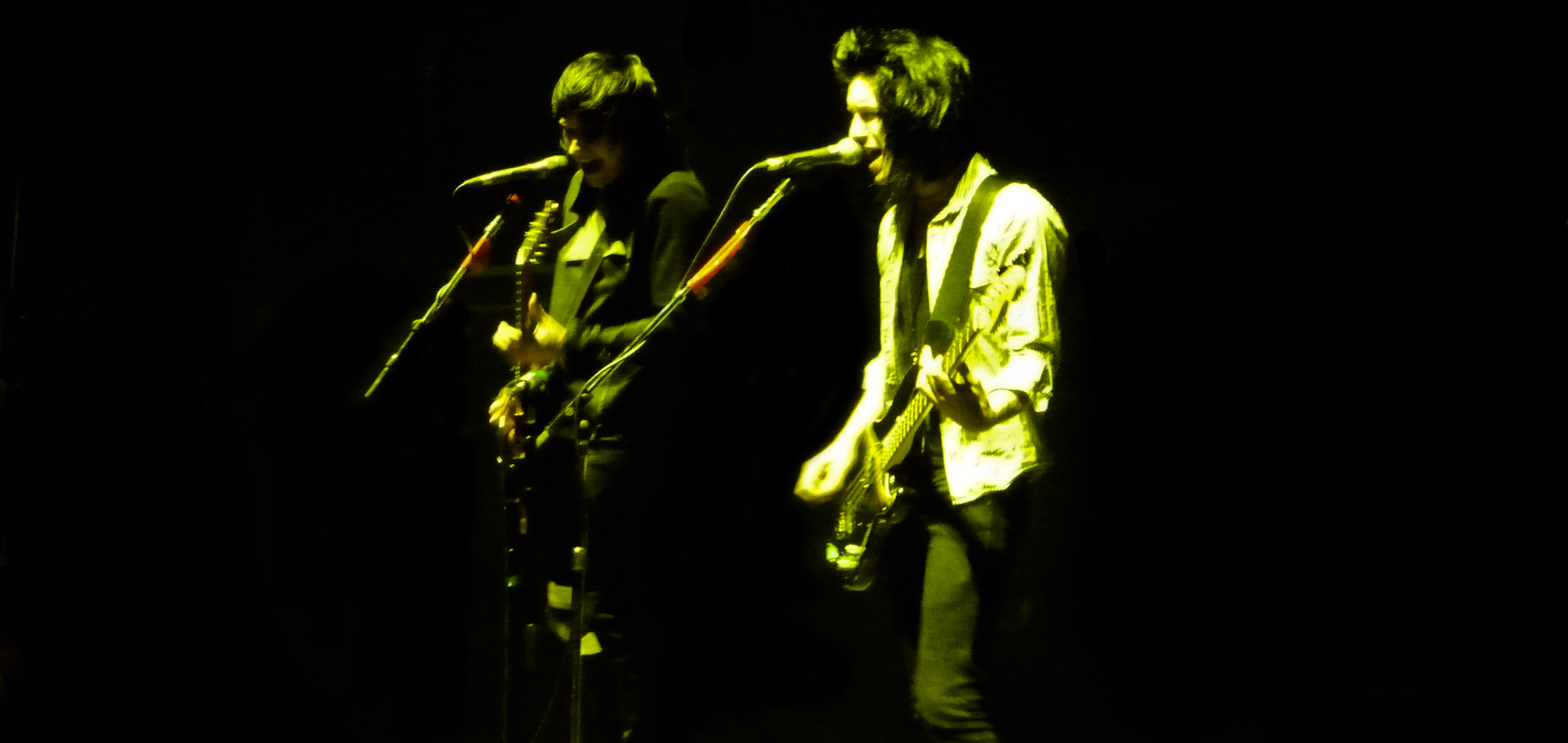
- LostAlone performing at MEN Arena

Background information
- Origin: Derby, England, UK
- Genres: Rock, progressive rock, post-hardcore, pop punk, alternative rock, symphonic rock
- Years active: 2005–2014, 2022–present
- Labels: Warner Bros., Graphite, The End (US)
- Members: Steven Battelle; Alan Williamson; Mark Gibson
- Past members: Tom Kitchen
- Website: lostalone.com

LostAlone are a British rock band from Derby, England, formed in 2005. The band consists of Steven Battelle (lead vocals, guitar), Alan Williamson (bass guitar, backing vocals), and Mark Gibson (drums, percussion, backing vocals).

LostAlone have released four studio albums: Say No to the World (2007), I'm a UFO in This City (2012) and Shapes of Screams released on 7 April 2014. Their latest album, The Warring Twenties, was released on 30 September 2022.

The band have played headline tours in the UK and mainland Europe as well as regularly supporting notable artists such as My Chemical Romance, Thirty Seconds to Mars, Enter Shikari and Paramore. They have also made appearances at festivals such as Taste of Chaos, Give it a Name, Download, Reading, T in the Park, Oxegen and Rock am Ring. They received their first major award nomination when they were nominated for "Best British Newcomer" at the Kerrang! Awards in 2007.

In late 2021, the band announced they had been invited by My Chemical Romance to join them for a set of stadium shows which took place at Stadium MK (Milton Keynes, England), Sophia Gardens Cricket Ground, Cardiff and the Eden Project, Cornwall. These landmark events commenced in May 2022 after a two-year postponement due to the COVID-19 pandemic.

The band have announced a UK mini-tour which will take place December 2022.

== History ==
=== 2005–2008: Formation and Say No to the World ===
Singer guitarist Steven Battelle and drummer Mark Gibson formed LostAlone with bassist Tom Kitchen in 2005 after disbanding their previous band Intentions of an Asteroid. Battelle and Gibson then created their own label, Scorpia, to represent their new band and to handle the production and distribution of their subsequent releases. The band's debut album, Say No to the World, was released on 11 March 2007. It received positive reviews from critics. and spawned three singles, "Blood is Sharp", "Unleash the Sands of All Time", and "Elysium".

=== 2009–2013: I'm a UFO in This City ===
LostAlone signed to U.S. label Sire Records in December 2009, after spending the majority of the year writing the follow-up to Say No To The World. During May 2010, the band recorded in Los Angeles with acclaimed producers Jacknife Lee and Greg Wells, executive producer Gerard Way of My Chemical Romance, and engineers Alan Moulder, and Mark Needham. The band released "Paradox on Earth" as a free download ahead of the album on 13 February 2011. Due to changes in personnel, LostAlone were released from their contract and given the commercial and creative rights to their album, I'm a UFO in This City which was later released on 5 March 2012 on Graphite Records to universal acclaim:

- "… it can only be a matter of time before this unabashed explosion of deadly hooks, dirty riffs and lighter aloft ballads regularly sell out stadiums." 8/10 NME
- "LostAlone understand that it's about bombast, being ridiculous and pushing your act, attitude and amps up to 11." KKKK Kerrang!
- "Breathtaking Queen style harmonies and classic metal bite." Classic Rock
- "Big, bombastic and littered with choruses the size of Jupiter." Rock Sound
- "Complex, ambitious, brave, inspiring, exciting, interesting, boundary breaking…LostAlone are one of the most exciting bands the UK has to offer." 10/10 Ourzone

The band released five of the album's songs as singles in 2012: "Do You Get What You Pray For?", "Love Will Eat You Alive", "Paradox on Earth", "Vesuvius", and "Creatures". Their second single, "Love Will Eat You Alive" was released on 1 April 2012, being added to the BBC Radio 1 playlist and receiving praise from notable radio presenters such as Fearne Cotton. The third single, "Paradox on Earth" was released on 10 June 2012 and again received support from stations such as BBC Radio One, Kerrang! Radio, MTV Rocks, Scuzz and XFM. In July 2012, the band gave away a free demo track titled "Everybody Dies But the World's Still Turning". On 16 December 2012, the band released "I Want Christmas Always", a Christmas themed single which received a 4K review in Kerrang! magazine.

At the end of 2012, Kerrang! named I'm a UFO in This City as the 29th best album of the year. The website The Digital Fix added to the band's end of year accolades by placing the album in their albums of the year and Matt Stocks from Kerrang! Radio named "Creatures" as his track of the year.

The band's global presence increased in 2013 with Alternative Press naming them as of the 101 bands to look out for. I'm a UFO in This City saw a release in North America on 2 April 2013 on The End Records. The band ended the year by releasing "The Bells! The Bells!!" on 11 November 2013, the first single from their upcoming studio album.

=== 2014: Shapes of Screams ===
LostAlone officially announced their third studio album, Shapes of Screams on 13 February 2014. Released on 7 April 2014 on Graphite Records to critical acclaim including a 5K (5/5) review in Kerrang! magazine.

"Shapes Of Screams is an album filled with first-kiss adrenaline, heart bursting happiness, life-affirming air-guitar moments and demented genius that will leave you delighted for hearing it" 5/5 Kerrang!

"That LostAlone aren't Bon Jovi-massive yet is a source of consternation." NME

"A fearless and absorbing work, it's likely to be the finest rock album you'll hear this year." The Digital Fix

"Shapes Of Screams proves a continuation of their non-existent sonic boundaries." Indulge Sound

"LostAlone continue their quest to resurrect epic, almost ridiculous, grand rock on album three." Total Guitar

"If I could only make one bold proclamation about music this year, it is this: LostAlone are the most underrated band in the world. Of all time" Alternative Press

On 15 October 2014 the band announced that they were to split after completing the rest of their European tour and two UK shows in London and their home town of Derby on 19 December. The band stated that; "unfortunately for us events have transpired that make it impossible right now for us to continue the band we love" before thanking fans for their support.

=== 2022: The Warring Twenties ===
LostAlone released their fourth studio album, The Warring Twenties on September 30, 2022 (via Dharma Records). The 10-track album, written and recorded in London, Derby, Nottingham and New York features the reformed band following their six year hiatus. Kerrang! magazine enthusiastically reviewed the album, noting the significance of band's return, gaving the album a 4/5 review, stating "LostAlone are here with flaming guitars, the biggest shades you've ever seen, and a fistful of tickets to Paradise. Welcome back. Not a moment too soon." In a separate feature article, Kerrang! journalist Nick Ruskell hailed frontman Steven Battelle as a "songwriting genius". Lostalone will tour the album across the UK in December 2022.

== Musical style and influences ==
Steven Battelle has described the band to be influenced by anything with a pulse and a melody although bands he has referred to more than once have been Queen, Guns N' Roses, Iron Maiden, Mansun, Pink Floyd, Weezer and Beach Boys Whilst none of these are particularly prevalent in the band's overall sound, there are subtle nods to these bands both musically, lyrically and dynamically in the band's music. Battelle (songwriter) in particular, embodies the energy and direction of the band. A versatile vocalist and guitarist, he has developed a stage style which has grown to include alternative slide guitar techniques, push-ups on stage mid-song, handing out custard creams, and the crowd-pleasing 'flip-catch-guitar-solo-with-shoe' move. The band's style combines fast, heavy riffs with slower, melodic sections and strong vocal harmonies to create a sound that cannot be easily pigeonholed, it sits somewhere within the rock/alternative scene.

== Touring ==
LostAlone have toured extensively across the UK and Europe, supporting several bands, most notably Thirty Seconds to Mars, Enter Shikari, Paramore and My Chemical Romance. They have also constantly toured the UK and Europe as a headline act in between supporting more established acts mentioned above. Their first ever show was in Derby on 30 January 2005. The band have also appeared on numerous high-profile European festivals including Taste of Chaos, Give it a Name, Download, Rock am Ring, Rock im Park, T in the Park, Oxegen and the Carling Weekend. They have had one headline tour which was in support of their debut album, Say No To The World. In 2008 started with a five-date headline tour of Finland with Wiidakko, then main support to 30 Seconds To Mars in the UK. In February the band again toured with Paramore after which they announced that they would take a break from touring and return to the rehearsal room to write their second record. The band toured as the opening act for Thirty Seconds to Mars on their European 2010 Tour and have recently supported My Chemical Romance on their 2011 UK arena tour along with The Blackout, throughout February. In April 2011, they also toured with My Passion throughout the UK. In February 2012 LostAlone began a 35 date tour as support (along with Mojo Fury) for InMe, followed by a sold-out headline show in their hometown of Derby on 7 April at The Victoria Inn, before embarking on a headline European tour, this time with InMe as their support. Five more UK headline dates in May were announced at the start of April. The band return to mainland Europe in September for a string of shows with Australian band Tonight Alive, the tour then returns to the UK travelling up and down the country.

In November 2012, the band played four arena shows in support of Evanescence along with The Used. The 4-date tour visited Nottingham, Manchester, Birmingham and London.

In December 2012 the band played their biggest ever hometown show at the Assembly Rooms in Derby, the show gained a double page 5K review in Kerrang the following issue, the highest rating possible.

February 2013 the band embarked on a UK headline tour, the band played eight shows around the UK ending in London. The day after the tour finished, the band announced it would be travelling to the US in March to play the legendary South By South West Festival in Austin Texas.

In November/December, the band embarked on a five-week tour with The Darkness, finishing with a hometown Derby headline show. January 2014 saw the band played main support to The Blackout on their UK rescheduled tour dates. Shortly after the tour finished the band announced a headline run in April to coincide with the release of their new album. March 2014 sees the band Headlining the Big Deal stage at Takedown festival and also appearances at Radstock festival at the end of the month. They played a live set in the That's Entertainment store in Derby on 12 April for the release of 'Shapes of Screams'. UK tour in April which received more critical acclaim including a KKKKK 5/5 review for the Manchester show in Kerrang!

The band spent the summer of 2014 on the festival circuit including sonisphere Merthyr Rocks and many more than into a European tour beginning in Madrid and ending in Berlin.

In December 2022, the band will tour the UK in support of their latest album The Warring Twenties and about a year later; they supported McFly throughout the Power to Play tour.

== Exposure and Press ==
Following and in support of the release of the singles "Blood Is Sharp", "Unleash The Sands Of All Time" and "Elysium" the band have received significant national and international press interest, most notable being support from Bruce Dickinson (of Iron Maiden) on his BBC Radio 6music rock show. Following an interview on the show, Bruce listed the band in his top 5 singles of 2006. and has regularly played the various singles on his show. Zane Lowe has also regularly included the band on his evening radio show on BBC Radio 1.

The music videos for the singles "Blood Is Sharp" and "Unleash The Sands Of All Time" have been in rotation on many music channels across Europe / UK, including MTV, VH1, and Scuzz.Some high-profile bands have declared support for the band by mentioning them frequently in interviews around the world, including all members of My Chemical Romance, Gerard Way, Hayley Williams, Jared Leto, and Bruce Dickinson. The band were nominated for Best British newcomer at the 2007 Kerrang! Awards which they attended. Since the release of the first single 'Do You Get What You Pray For?' from their new album, the band have been gaining huge support from the music press and radio. The first single received 'Single of the Week' status on both Kerrang Radio and XFM, plus Radio One's Zane Lowe showed big support to the track playing it every week. The video also gained 'Video of the week' on Kerrang TV and has stayed in the Hot Rock top 20 for weeks. Scuzz TV also play-listed the video and championed the band.

Single "Love Will Eat You Alive" was placed on the Radio One "In New Music We Trust" playlist, and has had frequent airplay by several Radio One DJs including Fearne Cotton and Scott Mills. In an interview with Rock & Rose, singer Steven Battelle expressed surprise at this level of mainstream exposure: "Being play-listed on Radio 1, that's huge. You get spot plays on the evening shows but now we're proper daytime radio and that's not something that I thought would happen with our band, not straight away anyway."

Pre release the hype surrounding the artistic quality of Shapes of Screams was talked about by many contemporary bands using the social networking site Twitter to show support for the record.

Steven Battelle was featured occasionally in Kerrang! with highlights including 92% on the Ultimate Rockstar Test and being named as the 26th Greatest rockstar living in the world today where he appeared on the cover.

In 2024 Steven Battelle gave an exclusive interview to the People Behind The Pedals podcast where he talked about his guitars, equipment and recent writing collaboration with McFly.

== Band members ==
Final line-up

- Steven Battelle – lead vocals, guitar, (2005–present)
- Mark Gibson – drums, backing vocals (2005–present)
- Alan Williamson – bass, backing vocals, (2009–present)

Former members

- Tom Kitchen – bass (2005–2009)

== Discography ==
Studio albums	Label	Release date
Say No to the World	Marx Capital	2007
I'm a UFO in This City	Graphite	2012
Shapes of Screams	Graphite	2014
The Warring Twenties	Dharma	2022

Singles and EPs	Album	Label	Release date
Light The Waves - The First Tour Ep	Extended Play	Gibson-Battelle	2005
Blood Is Sharp	Say No to the World	Marx Capital	2006
Blood Is Sharp	Say No to the World	Modern English	2006
Unleash The Sands Of All Time	Say No to the World	Scorpia	2006
Elysium	Say No to the World	Scorpia	2007
Say No To The World	Say No to the World	Marx Capital	2007
Do You Get What You Pray For?	I'm a UFO in This City	Graphite	2012
Love Will Eat You Alive	I'm a UFO in This City	Graphite	2012
I Want Christmas Always		Graphite	2012
Paradox On Earth	I'm a UFO in This City	Graphite	2012
Vesuvius	I'm a UFO in This City	Graphite	2012
Creatures	Shapes of Screams	Graphite	2012
The Bells! The Bells!!	Shapes of Screams	Graphite	2013
Scarlet Letter Rhymes	Shapes of Screams	Graphite	2014
Crusaders	Shapes of Screams	Graphite	2014
The Last Drop of Forever	The Warring Twenties	Dharma	2022
Punchline Punched Back	The Warring Twenties	Dharma	2022
Enduring the Dream	The Warring Twenties	Dharma	2022

== Awards and nominations ==
Kerrang! Awards

Year	Nominee / work	Award	Result
2007	LostAlone	Best British Newcomer	Nominated
