= Baby You're a Haunted House =

2018 single by Gerard Way

Single by Gerard Way
- Released: October 26, 2018
- Recorded: 2018
- Genre: Garage pop; power pop; pop-punk; punk rock
- Length: 2:46
- Label: Reprise
- Songwriters: Gerard Way; Mikey Way; Doug McKean
- Producers: Gerard Way; Doug McKean

Gerard Way singles chronology
"Into the Cave We Wander" (2016)	"Baby You're a Haunted House" (2018)	"Getting Down the Germs" (2018)

Lyric video
- "Baby You're a Haunted House" on YouTube

"Baby You're a Haunted House" is a song by the American singer-songwriter Gerard Way. It was released as a standalone single on October 26, 2018, through Reprise Records. A garage pop, power pop, pop-punk, and punk rock song, Way stated that the lyrics were about "our inner ghosts and demons and what it feels like being in love and having to deal with your own internal horror show". The song was written by Gerard Way, Mikey Way, and Doug McKean, and was produced by McKean and Way.

"Baby You're a Haunted House" was previewed on Instagram shortly before its release. It received positive reviews from music critics, with many praising its sound and style. The song charted in the United States, where it reached number 34 on the Hot Rock & Alternative Songs chart, number 11 on the Rock Digital Song Sales chart, and number nine on the Alternative Digital Song Sales chart.

A music video for "Baby You're a Haunted House", directed by Claire Marie Vogel, was released alongside the single. It features skeletons performing along to the song, with a lo-fi style atmosphere present. Way stated that he "wanted to do something a little more special than a standard lyric video", and claimed it was a collaboration between him and Devin Sarno. The music video premiered the same day as the single and reached over a million views a few days after its release.

== Background and release ==
In 2016, Gerard Way released the extended play (EP) "Pinkish" / "Don't Try" for Record Store Day that year, and also issued the single "Into the Cave We Wander", which he wrote with My Chemical Romance bandmate Ray Toro. (Note: "Into the Cave We Wander" was also released in 2017 as part of Record Store Day.) In March 2018, it was announced Way was working on new music, stating: "Something else? Again, too early to tell, but the process has started and happens every Friday at the moment. I’m in the discovery phase, and very excited about that." Doug McKean produced "Baby You're a Haunted House" with Way. McKean also served as the recording engineer and mixing engineer for the song, and Michelle Mancini was the mastering engineer. Alongside the technicals, it features Way on vocals and guitar, as well as Mikey Way on bass, Ian Fowles on guitar, and Tom Rasulo on drums. It was written by the Way brothers and McKean. The song was recorded in 2018 at Way's recording studio.

Way released a 15–second snippet of "Baby You're a Haunted House" on Instagram on October 22, 2018. It was released for Halloween on October 26, through Reprise Records; a merchandise bundle was also released accompanying the single. In the United States, the song reached number 34 on the Hot Rock & Alternative Songs chart, peaked at number 11 on the Rock Digital Song Sales chart, and also reached number nine on the Alternative Digital Song Sales chart. The cover art was designed by Damien Webb, depicting a miniature house surrounded by grass. According to Alex Young of Consequence, "Baby You're a Haunted House" marked the first taste of a solo project Way was working on. Alternative Press included the release of "Baby You're a Haunted House" on their list of 23 Music Moments From 2018.

== Composition and lyrics ==
"Baby You're a Haunted House"
A 15-second sample from the chorus of "Baby You're a Haunted House". A garage pop, power pop, pop-punk, and punk rock song, its lyrics detail "our inner ghosts and demons", according to Way.

At two minutes and 46 seconds in length, "Baby You're a Haunted House" is a garage pop, power pop, pop-punk, and punk rock song. Sophie Ding of Billboard noted that Way's vocals lean into a more pop-focused direction than some of his other material. The song contains "thrashing guitars" and features an "angsty gothic bop" vibe according to Matt Moen of Paper. Moen also compared the punk vibe of the song to Cheap Trick's "I Wish It Was Christmas Today" (2017). Daisy Jones, writing for Vice, compared the song to those of Weezer and Wavves, additionally writing "this song is the sort of thing you’d find soundtracking a 2000s teen movie". Nathan Blackstone of When The Horn Blows noted that the chorus is the most integral part of the song, writing that its "almost reminiscent of My Chemical Romance's brief foray into children's music". Mark Deming of AllMusic observed that the track "was an exercise in noisy pop".

Lyrically, Way discussed that the lyrics are "about all our inner ghosts and demons and what it feels like being in love and having to deal with your own internal horror show." The core lyrics are "Baby, you're a haunted house / Better find another superstition / We're gonna stay in love somehow / 'Cause baby, you're a haunted house." Moen claimed that the lyrics confront "the sticky reality of how our personal demons can sabotage even the best relationships".

== Critical reception ==
"Baby You're a Haunted House" received positive reviews from music critics. Jones wrote that the song "slaps", meanwhile Moen described it as a "head-banger". Additionally, Blackstone praised its sound dynamic, and noted that the song was "a solid surprise for fans". Chad Childers of Loudwire stated that "While the title may suggest something spooky, the song is anything but. This bouncy little number is very accessible and the type of song that may have you singing along unconsciously due to its catchy nature." Rolling Stone's Brittany Spanos called the song "Halloween-ready" and a "fuzzy power-pop song [that] reflects the Britpop twist in [Way's] sound from his 2014 debut solo album Hesitant Alien".

An anonymous writer at DIY referred to the song as "fuzzy offering", and stated it was "packed with an earwormy chorus". Shahlin Graves of Coup De Main Magazine praised the fact the song was released around Halloween, calling it "seasonally appropriate". Jason Pettigrew, writing for Alternative Press, stated that "Baby You're a Haunted House is "a perfect mix of pop melody and fuzz-pedal worship", and claimed that it would be "the perfect theme song for a Saturday morning kids show". Reviewing the music video, Scott Munro of Louder stated that it was a "catchy track". Jason Tate of chorus.fm stated that "Baby You're a Haunted House" was simply a "dip into that proverbial water" for Way's future music.

== Music video ==
The music video for "Baby You're a Haunted House" features skeletons performing along to the song. Way claimed that he "wanted to do something a little more special than a standard lyric video".

The music video for "Baby You're a Haunted House" was directed by Claire Marie Vogel, who had previously worked with My Chemical Romance on the music videos for Danger Days: The True Lives of the Fabulous Killjoys (2010). It depicts skeletons performing to the track, with a lo-fi style present. The video is shot in a VHS style, with a grainy effect appearing overtop of it. Way does not appear in the video. He stated that he "wanted to do something a little more special than a standard lyric video", revealing that it was a collaboration with Devin Sarno, whom he had previously worked with on the music video for "I'm Not Okay (I Promise)" (2004). Mikey Way came up with the concept for the video, who said he "could picture a video like one of those old monster cartoons from the '60s of musicians toe tapping and Beatle-bopping to this song." Kerrang! drew comparisons between the music video and Vic Rattlehead, the illustrated mascot for the American thrash metal band Megadeth. The music video premiered on Way's YouTube channel alongside the song's debut. A few days after its release, the video hit over a million views. To celebrate, Way posted on Instagram about the production behind it.

== Personnel ==
Credits are adapted from Gerard Way and the digital liner notes.

Musicians

- Gerard Way – lead vocals, guitar, songwriter, producer
- Mikey Way – bass, songwriter
- Ian Fowles – guitar
- Tom Rasulo – drums

Technicals

- Doug McKean – recording engineer, mixing engineer, songwriter, producer
- Michelle Mancini – mastering engineer

== Charts ==
Chart performance for "Baby You're a Haunted House"
Chart (2018)	Peak position
US Hot Rock & Alternative Songs (Billboard)	34
US Rock Digital Song Sales (Billboard)	11
US Alternative Digital Song Sales (Billboard)	9
