= Gerard Way =

American singer (born 1977)

- Way performing in 2025 at Metlife Stadium in New Jersey
- Born: Gerard Arthur Way; April 9, 1977 (age 49); Summit, New Jersey, U.S.
- Occupations: Singer; songwriter; comic book writer
- Years active: 2001–present
- Spouse: Lindsey Ballato (m. 2007)
- Children: 1
- Relatives: Mikey Way (brother)
- Musical career
- Genres: Alternative rock; emo; pop-punk; post-hardcore; punk rock; hard rock
- Instrument: Vocals
- Works: Discography
- Member of: My Chemical Romance
- Website: gerardway.com

Gerard Arthur Way (born April 9, 1977) is an American singer, songwriter, and comic book writer, best known as the lead vocalist and co-founder of the rock band My Chemical Romance. They are considered one of the most influential rock groups of the 2000s and a major act in the emo and pop-punk genres, despite the band rejecting the former label.

Way released his (Note: Way uses both he/him and they/them pronouns. This article uses he/him for consistency.) debut solo album, Hesitant Alien, in 2014. He also co-created and wrote the comic series The True Lives of the Fabulous Killjoys and The Umbrella Academy, the latter of which was later adapted into a popular Netflix series that ran for four seasons. He is also the founder of DC Comics' Young Animal imprint, and wrote the imprint's flagship series, Doom Patrol.

== Early life ==
Gerard Arthur Way was born in Summit, New Jersey, on April 9, 1977, the son of Donna Lee (née Rush) and Donald Way. He is of Italian and Scottish ancestry. Raised in Belleville, New Jersey, alongside brother Mikey Way, he first began singing publicly in the fourth grade, when he played the role of Peter Pan in a school musical production. His maternal grandmother, Elena Lee Rush, was a great creative influence who taught him to sing, paint, and perform from a young age; he has said that "she has taught me everything I know". While in elementary school, the glam metal band Bon Jovi was instrumental in forming his love of music.

At the age of 15, Way was held at gunpoint. As he said in an April 2008 Rolling Stone interview, "I got held up with a .357 Magnum, had a gun pointed to my head and put on the floor, execution-style." He went on to say that "no matter how ugly the world gets or how stupid it shows me it is, I always have faith [in it]". At age 16, he appeared on an episode of Sally Jesse Raphael to discuss the controversy surrounding the publicizing of serial killer Jeffrey Dahmer's crimes in comic books. Way attended Belleville High School, graduating in 1995. Deciding to pursue a career in the comic-book industry, he attended the School of Visual Arts in New York City, graduating with a Bachelor of Fine Arts in 1999.

== Music career ==
=== 2001–2013: My Chemical Romance ===
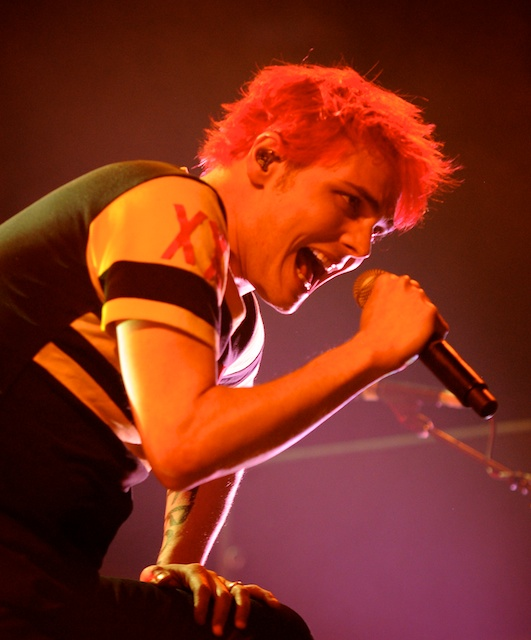
Way in Montreal, Canada, during the Honda Civic Tour in August 2011

As teenagers, Gerard and his brother Mikey Way, who later became the bassist of My Chemical Romance, were influenced by artists including Iron Maiden, The Misfits, Danzig, Black Flag, Queen, Pulp, Alkaline Trio, Blur, Morrissey, and The Smiths. Way originally wanted to be a guitarist. His grandmother bought him his first guitar at the age of eight, and he played in short-lived bands such as Ray Gun Jones and Nancy Drew with future bandmate Ray Toro. When he was not successful (one band kicked him out due to his lack of skill with the guitar), he chose to concentrate on his art career.

Way was working as an intern for Cartoon Network in New York City during the September 11, 2001 attacks. Seeing the effects of the attacks first-hand prompted Way to change his views on life in the following weeks. He told Spin magazine, "I literally said to myself, 'Fuck art. I've gotta get out of the basement. I've gotta see the world. I've gotta make a difference.'" To help deal with the emotional effects the attacks had on him, Way wrote the lyrics to the song "Skylines and Turnstiles", which became the first song by My Chemical Romance.

Way has also contributed vocally to other bands' songs such as Every Time I Die's "Kill the Music", Head Automatica's "Graduation Day", Say Anything's "In Defense of the Genre", and The Oval Portrait's "From My Cold Dead Hands" and "Barnabus Collins Has More Skeletons in His Closet Than Vincent Price".

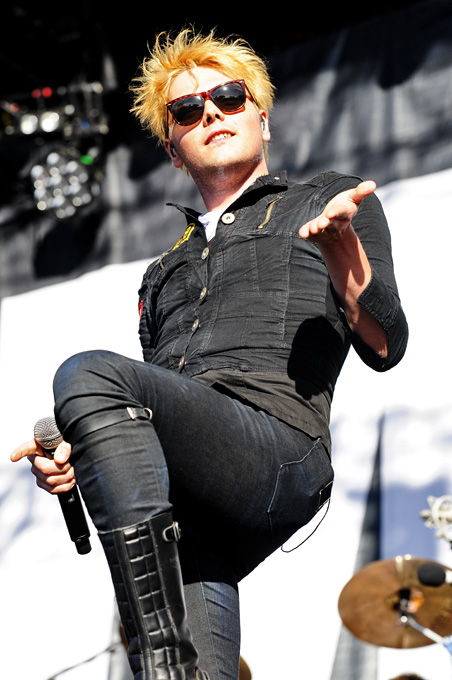
Way performing in 2012

In interviews, Way has stated that music and his artwork were effective outlets for his longtime battles against depression, alcoholism, and prescription drug abuse. Using music to resolve personal battles has also led Way to create deeply personal songs such as "Helena", which he wrote in memory of his late grandmother.

On March 22, 2013, My Chemical Romance announced their break up.

=== 2014–2016: Hesitant Alien ===
In May 2014, Way launched his Tumblr-based website where he announced that he had signed to Warner Bros. Records as a solo artist and was nearing completion of his first solo album. Further to this he announced a new song, "Action Cat", released later in June as a promotional single to his new album and his first solo shows at Reading and Leeds Festivals 2014. He later announced another solo performance that took place at Portsmouth's Wedgewood Rooms on August 20. On August 19, Way released a music video for the song "No Shows", released as the first single off the new album on August 19. The album, titled Hesitant Alien, was released on September 30, 2014.

When Way was asked why he chose to implement the Britpop genre into his music he stated that he enjoyed the energy and style of the music and its scene, and was urged to revive aspects of the genre in America.

In February and March 2015, Way performed as a solo artist with The Hormones on the main stage of the Australian 2015 Soundwave music festivals, and headlined an additional sideshow in Melbourne.

In early 2015, it was announced that he would perform at the Boston Calling Music Festival in May 2015.

On Record Store Day 2016, Way released two exclusive, unreleased tracks from Hesitant Alien titled "Don't Try" and "Pinkish".

=== 2018–present: Later solo singles and band reunion ===
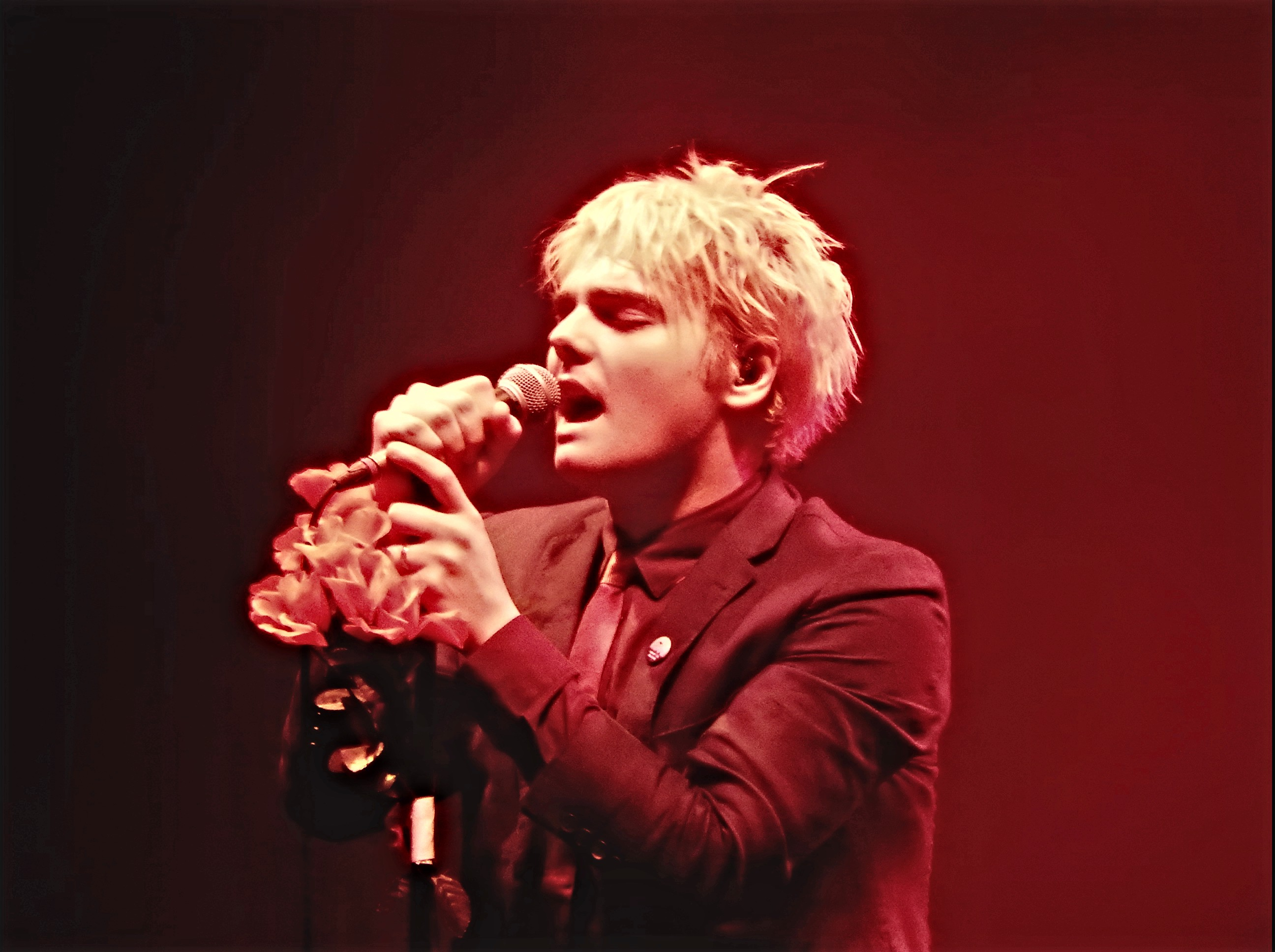
Way performing at Southampton Guildhall in 2015

On October 26, 2018, Way released his first major solo single in over two years, titled "Baby You're a Haunted House". The single features Way's brother and former bandmate, Mikey Way, on bass. The official lyric video, featuring four skeleton-masked musicians performing the song, was released on YouTube on the same day.

On November 15, Way released another single, "Getting Down the Germs", which was co-written with former bandmate Ray Toro. The single "gives a peek of where [Way] will be headed musically," according to a statement released by Way.

On December 14, Way released a third single, "Dasher", which features additional vocals from Lydia Night of The Regrettes. The single is a Christmas-themed story about a girl who falls in love with a reindeer as they await to be reunited after a long absence.

On January 24, 2019, Way released a cover of "Hazy Shade of Winter" by Simon & Garfunkel, once again in collaboration with Toro. The song was featured in the trailer for the Netflix television series adaptation of Way's The Umbrella Academy, which was released the same day. On February 8, 2019, Way released a cover of "Happy Together" by the Turtles, again featuring Toro. The song also appears on The Umbrella Academy.

On October 31, 2019, My Chemical Romance announced they would be reuniting with a date in Los Angeles on December 20 and a new merchandise line. They later announced a 2020 North American tour, as well as dates in Australia, New Zealand, and Japan. The tour was postponed to 2022, due to the COVID-19 pandemic.

On July 8, 2020, Way released an original song titled "Here Comes the End", which features singer Judith Hill and appears on the second season of The Umbrella Academy.

On November 12, 2024, My Chemical Romance announced the Long Live The Black Parade tour, taking place throughout North America in 2025. The tour is a celebration of their third album, The Black Parade. It introduces new story lines that incorporate into the world-building of the original album.

=== Other musical collaborations ===
In 2008, Way and musical project Julien-K remixed a version of the song "Sleep When I'm Dead" by the Cure for their EP Hypnagogic States. All profits gained from the sales of the EP go to funding the International Red Cross.

In early 2009, Way and Japanese singer Kyosuke Himuro co-produced the new theme song for Final Fantasy VII Advent Children Complete, the Blu-ray director's cut of the movie sequel to the popular video game, Final Fantasy VII. He is also credited with writing the lyrics, and singing alongside Himuro. The song, titled "Safe and Sound", was released on iTunes on April 29, 2009. "Safe and Sound" is only heard on the Japanese release of the film; the English release uses Himuro's "Calling" (the original ending theme for Advent Children) in place of it. He also contributed vocals for the vocal mix of the deadmau5 song "Professional Griefers".

A longtime supporter of the British rock band LostAlone, Way is the executive producer of their second studio album I'm a UFO in This City (2012).

Way contributed guest vocals to "Falling in Love Will Kill You" from Wrongchilde's debut solo album Gold Blooded, a pseudonym project from Kill Hannah frontman Mat Devine.

In 2015, Way co-wrote and contributed backing vocals to the song "Louder Than Your Love" on Black Veil Brides frontman Andy Black's debut solo album The Shadow Side.

Way featured in Rōnin by Ibaraki in March 2022 alongside Trivium's lead vocalist and guitarist Matt Heafy.

In 2026, he performed guest vocals on and appeared in the accompanying music video for the song "No Place of Warmth" by Dallas-based metal band Frozen Soul. Loudwire said his vocals on this track had elements of black metal and spoken word, and that he appeared as a "grotesque hooded figure" in the video.

==== The Mock-Ups ====
In 2025, Way and members from The Interrupters announced a new project named The Mock-Ups, with Way providing vocals and bass. Their debut single, "I Wanna Know Your Name", was released on September 16 through Gauzy Records.

== Other ventures ==
=== 1993–present: Writing ===
Way's first attempt at writing a comic was at the age of 16 in 1993, writing a comic book series called On Raven's Wings, published by Hart D. Fisher's Boneyard Press. The series was cancelled after the second issue, however, due to the loss of its art team. Way was credited as Garry Way.

In 2007, Way began writing the comic-book miniseries The Umbrella Academy. Its first volume, Apocalypse Suite, was first released by Dark Horse Comics in their Free Comic Book Day issue on May 5, 2007. Since then, an eight-page story has been published entitled "Safe & Sound", which appeared in a collection of stories entitled MySpace Dark Horse Presents Volume One. The first official issue of The Umbrella Academy was released on September 19, 2007. The first issue sold out and consequently there was a second printing released on October 17, 2007. Apocalypse Suite also won the 2008 Eisner Award for Best Limited Series. The next installment of the series, Dallas, was released on November 26, 2008, and, following speculation that Way had retired indefinitely from comics, a third installment entitled Hotel Oblivion was released in 2018–2019.

Way and fellow artists Shaun Simon and Becky Cloonan co-created another comic-book series entitled The True Lives of the Fabulous Killjoys, which Way announced at 2009 San Diego Comic-Con. At the 2012 New York Comic Con, the team announced that the first look at the series would be released on 2013's Free Comic Book Day. The series continued the concepts introduced in the My Chemical Romance album, Danger Days: The True Lives of the Fabulous Killjoys (2010).

In 2011, My Chemical Romance stated that Mikey and Gerard were working on another comic book project which they had kept under wraps since mid-2009. As of 2015 nothing of this project has emerged.

On December 21, 2013, Gerard Way stated that he and Gabriel Bá will be working on parts three and four of his comic book series Umbrella Academy beginning in the new year.

In a podcast interview on December 31, 2013, with Chris Thompson from Pop Culture Hound, Way discussed his new Umbrella Academy series in more detail and confirmed he would do two volumes back-to-back, with a couple of flashback issues in-between. In addition, he discussed his new comic series All Ages which first appeared as a series of images on his Twitter feed. Although the project doesn't have a publisher or an artist at this stage, he is actively working on the story of cats in high school who are discovering their place in the world.

In 2014, it was announced that Way will be making his debut in the Marvel Universe by writing for the alternate universe Spider-Man series Edge of Spider-Verse. His story introduced Peni Parker, a Japanese-American student who pilots a bio-mechanical suit named SP//dr.

On March 21, 2024, Way announced a new comic book series Paranoid Gardens, with the first issue releasing in July.

=== 2001–present: Television ===
In 2001, Way co-created a cartoon with Joe Boyle called The Breakfast Monkey. They pitched it to Cartoon Network, but the network declined to pick up the concept on the grounds that it was too similar to the existing property Aqua Teen Hunger Force.

In 2013, Way made his television directorial debut on The Hub original series The Aquabats! Super Show!, co-directing and co-writing the season two finale "The AntiBats!" with series co-creators Christian Jacobs and Jason deVilliers. Additionally, Way's brother Mikey appears in the episode, playing the lead singer of a fictional death metal band called Asthma. The following year, Way, as part of the show's writing team, was nominated for a Daytime Emmy Award for "Outstanding Writing in a Children's Series".

In 2018, the character Peni Parker who he co-created appeared in Spider-Man: Into the Spider-Verse.

Way served as co-executive producer on the television series adaptation of The Umbrella Academy for its entire run from 2019 to 2024.

== Artistry ==
Some have suggested Way's name to be synonymous with the emo genre. According to Alternative Press Magazine, "When people think of emo, the My Chemical Romance frontman usually comes to the front of mind. [...] Way’s vocals ripple with emotional intensity and passion, leaning into darkness as much as hope." Way's lyrics incorporate a narrative format. His live performances have been described as "theatrical [and] soul-baring." Andrew Sacher of BrooklynVegan said "My Chem were really just more suited for arenas than basements in the first place. Gerard Way’s theatrical star power is undeniable; he was meant to share it with the world." According to Ilana Kaplan of Alternative Press: "Gerard Way channels Freddie Mercury with his theatrical pop-punk vocals, which make each of his songs feel epic." She also stated that Way "uses that power to make choruses haunting [and] creepy."

One of Way's earliest musical influences was David Bowie. Later, he was influenced by British rock band Queen, as well as various Britpop bands such as Blur, Lush, Suede, Pulp, Oasis and Supergrass. He was also strongly influenced by female-fronted Britpop artists such as Elastica, Sleeper and Echobelly, as well as the American indie rock groups Helium and Sleater-Kinney.

== Personal life ==
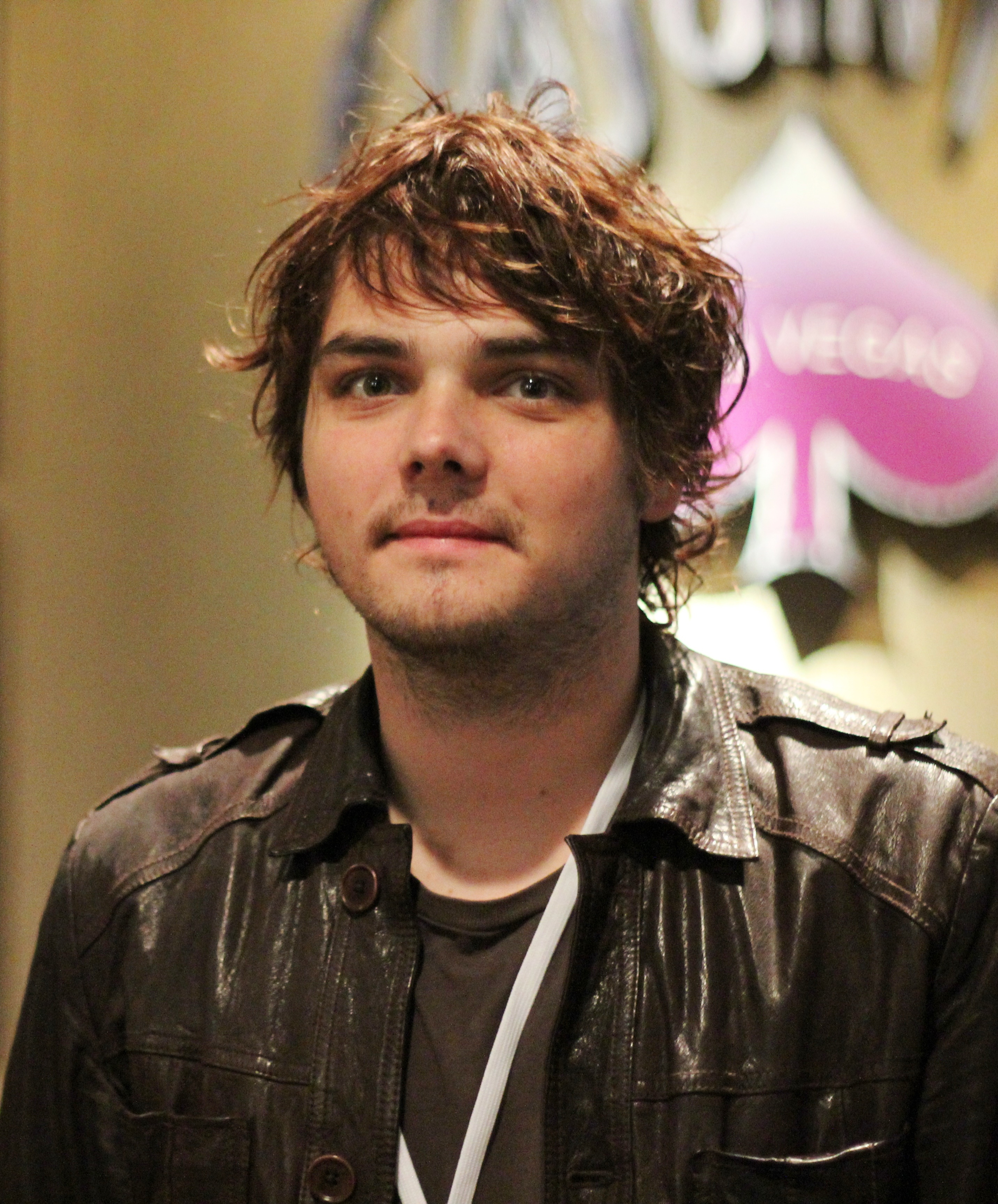
Way in 2012

Way struggled with alcoholism and prescription drug addiction for many years but as of 2007 was maintaining sobriety. In a November 2010 issue of Spin magazine, he said that having become a happier person and feeling more in control, he had been able to enjoy the occasional recreational drink.

On September 3, 2007, after a concert in Colorado, Way married Lindsey Ballato, bassist of Mindless Self Indulgence, backstage on the final date of the Projekt Revolution tour. A member of Live Nation's touring staff who was also an ordained minister performed the low-key ceremony. Their daughter was born on May 27, 2009. They live in Los Angeles.

Way was raised Catholic, stating in 2006 that he was "not Catholic anymore", and in 2013 that he was a theist who "had always acknowledged [he] received [...] artistic gifts from God".

In 2014, Way began openly discussing his gender identity struggles online and in interviews. In a Reddit Ask Me Anything (AMA) hosted by Way in October 2014, he stated: "I have always been extremely sensitive to those that have gender identity issues as I feel like I have gone through it as well, if even on a smaller scale. I have always identified a fair amount with the female gender, and began at a certain point in MCR to express this through my look and performance style. So it's no surprise that all of my inspirations and style influences were pushing gender boundaries. Freddy [sic] Mercury, Bowie, Iggy, early glam, T-Rex. Masculinity to me has always made me feel like it wasn't right for me."

In January 2015, Way was featured in The Boyzine, an independent zine published by SWMRS frontman Cole Becker. Way again discussed his gender identity, commenting: "I never really subscribed to the archetype masculinity growing up, I had no interest in sports or anything like that. There was a time where [sic] I was called a girl so often that when I discovered the idea of transgenderism I considered myself to be more of a girl. So I identify with trans people and women a lot because I was a girl to a lot of people growing up." In June 2015, Way said on Twitter that he uses he/him and they/them pronouns.

In 2015, Way revealed on Reddit that he is a second cousin of comedian and podcaster Joe Rogan. In October 2019, Rogan confirmed it on his podcast. He also said that, despite this, the two have never met.

== Discography ==
=== My Chemical Romance ===
Studio albums

- I Brought You My Bullets, You Brought Me Your Love (2002)
- Three Cheers for Sweet Revenge (2004)
- The Black Parade (2006)
- Danger Days: The True Lives of the Fabulous Killjoys (2010)

=== Solo ===
Studio albums

- Hesitant Alien (2014)

Other recordings

- "O Waly, Waly" (2014)
- "Pinkish" / "Don't Try" (2016)
- "Into the Cave We Wander" (with Ray Toro, 2016)
- "Baby You're a Haunted House" (2018)
- "Getting Down the Germs" (2018)
- "Dasher" (featuring Lydia Night, 2018)
- "Hazy Shade of Winter" (featuring Ray Toro, 2019)
- "Happy Together" (featuring Ray Toro, 2019)
- "Here Comes the End" (featuring Judith Hill, 2020)

==== Guest performances ====
- "Jet Black New Year" (by Thursday, backing vocals, 2002)
- "Devil in Mexico" (by Murder by Death, backing vocals, 2003)
- "Barnabus Collins Has More Skeletons in His Closet than Vincent Price" (by The Oval Portrait, backing vocals, 2003)
- "From My Cold Dead Hands" (by The Oval Portrait, backing vocals, 2003)
- "Kill the Music" (by Every Time I Die, backing vocals, 2005)
- "Graduation Day" (by Head Automatica, backing vocals, 2006)
- "In Defense of the Genre" (by Say Anything, backing vocals, 2007)
- "Safe and Sound" (by Kyosuke Himuro, vocals, 2009)
- "My Space" (by Evelyn Evelyn, backing vocals, 2010)
- "Professional Griefers" (by Deadmau5, vocals, 2012)
- "Falling in Love (Will Kill You)" (by Wrongchilde, vocals, 2014)
- "Louder Than Your Love" (by Andy Black, backing vocals, 2016)
- "Sailor in a Life Boat" (by Euringer, backing vocals, 2018)
- "Rōnin" (by Ibaraki, unclean vocals, 2022)
- "No Place of Warmth" (by Frozen Soul, unclean vocals, 2026)

==== Remixes ====
- "Sleep When I'm Dead" (Remix 4) (by The Cure, remix with Julien-K, 2008)

== Bibliography ==
=== Story credits ===
==== Series ====
- On Raven's Wings #1–2 (penciller Jose Santos, inker Dana Greene, letterer T. Warren Montgomery, cover artist Rob Nemeth, Boneyard Press, 1994)
- The Umbrella Academy
  - The Umbrella Academy: Apocalypse Suite #1–6 (artist Gabriel Bá, colorist Dave Stewart, letterer Nate Piekos, cover artist James Jean, Dark Horse Comics, 2007–2008)
  - The Umbrella Academy: Dallas #1–6 (artist Gabriel Bá, colorist Dave Stewart, letterer Nate Piekos, Dark Horse, 2008–2009)
  - The Umbrella Academy: Hotel Oblivion #1–7 (artist Gabriel Bá, colorist Nick Filardi, letterer Nate Piekos, Dark Horse, 2018–2019)
  - The Umbrella Academy: Plan B #1–ongoing (co-writer and artist Gabriel Bá, colorist Dave Stewart, letterer Nate Piekos, Dark Horse, 2025–ongoing)
  - You Look Like Death: Tales from the Umbrella Academy #1–6 (co-writer Shaun Simon, artist Ian Culbard, letterer Nate Piekos, cover artist Gabriel Bá, Dark Horse, 2020–2021)
- The True Lives of the Fabulous Killjoys
  - The True Lives of the Fabulous Killjoys #1–6 (co-writer Shaun Simon, artist Becky Cloonan, colorist Dan Jackson, letterer Nate Piekos, Dark Horse, 2013–2014)
  - The True Lives of the Fabulous Killjoys: National Anthem #1–6 (co-writer Shaun Simon, artist Leonardo Romero, colorist Jordie Bellaire, letterer Nate Piekos, Dark Horse, 2020–2021)
- Doom Patrol
  - Doom Patrol (vol. 6) #1–12 (artist Nick Derington, colorist Tamra Bonvillain, letterer Todd Klein, guest artist Mike Allred, guest colorist Laura Allred, additional inker Tom Fowler, DC's Young Animal, 2016–2018)
  - Doom Patrol: Weight of the Worlds #1–4, 6–7 (co-writers Jeremy Lambert and Steve Orlando; artists James Harvey, Evan "Doc" Shaner, Nick Pitarra, and Nick Derington; inker Mike Allred; colorists James Harvey, Sahan Rai, and Tamara Bonvillain; letterers James Harvey and Simon Bowland; DC's Young Animal; 2019–2020)
- Cave Carson Has a Cybernetic Eye #1–12 (co-writer Jon Rivera, artist Michael Avon Oeming, colorist Nick Filardi, letterer Clem Robins, DC's Young Animal, 2016–2017)
- Paranoid Gardens #1–6 (co-writer Shaun Simon, artist Chris Weston, colorist Dave Stewart, letterer Nate Piekos, Dark Horse, 2024)

==== Short stories and single issues ====
- The Umbrella Academy
  - "Mon Dieu!" (artist Gabriel Bá, colorist Dan Jackson, letterer Jason Hvam, appeared on darkhorse.com, 2006)
  - "...But the Past Ain't Through with You." (artist Gabriel Bá, colorist Dan Jackson, letterer Nate Piekos, appeared in Free Comic Book Day 2007, Dark Horse, 2007)
  - "Safe & Sound" (artist Gabriel Bá, colorist Dave Stewart, letterer Nate Piekos, appeared in MySpace Dark Horse Presents #1, Dark Horse, 2007)
  - "Anywhere but Here" (artist Gabriel Bá, colorist Dave Stewart, letterer Nate Piekos, appeared in MySpace Dark Horse Presents #12, Dark Horse, 2008)
  - "Hazel and Cha Cha Save Christmas" (co-writer Scott Allie, artist Tommy Lee Edwards, letterer John Workman, appeared in Hazel and Cha Cha Save Christmas: Tales from the Umbrella Academy, Dark Horse, 2019)
- "The True Lives of the Fabulous Killjoys: Dead Satellites" (co-writer Shaun Simon, artist Becky Cloonan, colorist Dan Jackson, letterer Nate Piekos, appeared in Free Comic Book Day 2013, Dark Horse, 2013)
- "One Thing's for Sure: SP//dr Is Still Intact" (artist Jack Wyatt, colorist Ian Herring, letterer Clayton Cowles, appeared in Edge of Spider-Verse #5, Marvel Comics, 2014)
- "Untitled" (artist Philip Bond, colorist Hi-Fi, letterer Sal Cipriano, appeared in Vertigo Quarterly CMYK #3: Yellow, Vertigo, 2014)
- "DC's Young Animal Mixtape" (artist Mike Allred, colorist Laura Allred, letterer Carlos M. Mangual, appeared in DC's Young Animal Mixtape Sampler #1, DC's Young Animal, 2017)
- "Joan of Arc" (artist Marley Zarcone, colorist Hi-Fi, letterer Aditya Bidikar, appeared in Femme Magnifique, ISBN 978-0985712044, Hi-Fi Academy Press, 2017)
- "Milk Wars" Part One (co-writer Steve Orlando, artists Aco, colorists Tamra Bonvillain and Marissa Louise, letterer Clem Robins, additional artist Hugo Petrus, appeared in JLA/Doom Patrol Special #1, DC Comics / DC's Young Animal, 2018)
- "Untitled" (artist Robert Wilson IV, colorist Kelly Fitzpatrick, letterer Ryan Ferrier, appeared in The Secret Loves of Geeks, ISBN 978-1506704739, Dark Horse, 2018)
- "Milk Wars" Part Four (co-writer Steve Orlando; artists Dale Eaglesham and Nick Derington; colorists Tamra Bonvillain and Marissa Louise; letterer Clem Robins; additional artists Sonny Liew, Ibrahim Moustafa, Michael Avon Oeming, and Marley Zarcone; appeared in Doom Patrol/JLA Special #1; DC / DC's Young Animal; 2018)
- "Edge of Spider-Geddon" Part Two (co-writer Lonnie Nadler and Zac Thompson, artist Alberto Alburquerque, colorist Tríona Farrell, letterer Cory Petit, additional artist Jack Wyatt, additional colorist Ian Herring, appeared in Edge of Spider-Geddon #2, Marvel, 2018)
- "Caught in a Mosh" (co-writer Mikey Way, artists Darick Robertson and Phillip Sevy, colorist Aladdin Collar, letterer AndWorld Design, appeared in Anthrax: Among the Living, ISBN 978-1940878591, Z2 Comics, 2021)

=== Interior art credits ===
- "Even Gunfighters Get the Willies" (writer Deb Picker, appeared in The Big Book of the Weird Wild West, ISBN 978-1563893612, Paradox Press, 1998)

=== Cover art credits ===
- The Umbrella Academy: Apocalypse Suite #1 (variant) (Dark Horse, 2007)
- Rex Mundi (vol. 2) #15 (cover colorist Dave Stewart, Dark Horse, 2008)
- The True Lives of the Fabulous Killjoys #1 (1:50 variant) (Dark Horse, 2013)
- The True Lives of the Fabulous Killjoys #1 (Ghost variant) (Dark Horse, 2013)
- Neverboy #1 (variant) (Dark Horse, 2015)

== Filmography ==
| Year | Title | Credit | Notes |
|---|---|---|---|
| 2011 | Yo Gabba Gabba! | Himself | Episode: "A Very Awesome Christmas" |
| 2013 | The Aquabats! Super Show! | Co-writer, co-director | Episode: "Anti-bats!" |
| 2015 | Pancake Mountain | Himself | |
| 2019–2024 | The Umbrella Academy | Co-executive producer | |
