= The Umbrella Academy: Dallas =

Comic book series by Gerard Way and Gabriel Bá

- Trade paperback cover. Art by Gabriel Bá.

Publication information
- Publisher: Dark Horse Comics
- Format: Limited series
- Genre: Superhero
- Publication date: November 26, 2008 – April 25, 2009
- No. of issues: 6
- Main character(s): Spaceboy; The Kraken; The Rumor; The Séance; Number Five; Vanya Hargreeves; Hazel; Cha-Cha; Carmichael

Creative team
- Created by: Gerard Way
- Written by: Gerard Way
- Artist(s): Gabriel Bá; Tony Ong (back covers)
- Letterer: Nate Piekos
- Colorist: Dave Stewart

Collected editions
- Dallas: ISBN 978-1-59582-345-8

The Umbrella Academy: Dallas is the second comic book limited series of The Umbrella Academy created and written by Gerard Way and illustrated by Gabriel Bá. It is the follow-up to Apocalypse Suite. The series ran for six issues from November 2008 to April 2009. Tony Ong provided back cover art for this series only. A trade paperback was released on September 30, 2009. The story revolves around Number Five and his association with the Kennedy assassination.

== Plot ==
=== Issue #1: "The Jungle" ===
The first issue was released on November 26, 2008.

In a flashback, the young Umbrella Academy battle the now-living statue of Abraham Lincoln as part of a deal between their adoptive father Hargreeves and President John F. Kennedy. In the present, following the events of Apocalypse Suite, Kraken has taken more of a leadership stance on the team as Spaceboy has become hugely obese due to depression. The Rumor, unable to use her reality-shifting powers due to the severing of her vocal cords, holds a grudge against a now-paralyzed and amnesiac Vanya. Number Five is hunted by men in gas masks; after a battle from which Number Five emerges the victor, a survivor manages to request the intervention of "Hazel and Cha-Cha", to which Number 5 responds with horror.

=== Issue #2: "Boy Scouts" ===
The second issue was released on December 24, 2008.

Hazel and Cha-Cha (two time-traveling serial killers who wear oversized cartoon animal masks) are at a diner eating pie. Hazel asks what is in it, but the cook won't tell them. The cook fondly explains his encounter with a businessman from Barcelona offering $5000 for the recipe, which was refused, and that the cook had told him that he'd have to chop off all his arms and legs in order to get the recipe out of him. The two men then proceed to do so. The Kraken encounters Lupo in his office at the police station as he is skimming through photos of a massacre caused by Number 5, and is questioned about Number 5. Kraken is clueless about his brother's whereabouts. The Kraken returns home and is infuriated at Spaceboy. The Rumor discovers the Monocle's monocle and with it, Number 5. The Seance is captured by Hazel and Cha-Cha, who want to use him to locate Number 5.

=== Issue #3: "Television" or "Are You There, God? It's Me, Klaus" ===
The third issue was released on January 28, 2009.

The chapter starts with the Seance inside of a television left on by the obese Spaceboy, who is asleep on the couch. As Seance is trying to tell Spaceboy that he will be killed, the television then breaks and Spaceboy wakes up. The Seance was communicating with Spaceboy through the television and Hazel and Cha-Cha found out, breaking the television. After some words about the Seance's shoes and powers are exchanged by the three, Cha-Cha puts a gun to the Seance's head. The Seance tries to pay his way out of his situation with money or "hooker amputees", but Hazel and Cha-Cha state that they have all they want, that is, the nukes referred to in the first issue's flashback. Hazel then shoots the Seance. Number 5 starts to tell the Rumor about his time in the future in which he left out major details. During his travel back to the present he was captured by the Temps Aeternalis, an agency that preserves the time continuum and recruits "anomalies" like Number 5 and puts them to work. He was changed through numerous surgeries and training, which explains much of the skills and other abilities he acquires through the series. Number 5 was considered the best and was specially trained by a Shubunkin Goldfish (Carmichael) with a genius-level intellect to handle specific individuals. Number 5 was then assigned to assassinate President Kennedy but rebelled. Spaceboy flies to where the Seance was held and finds him dead. An electric prod handled by Hazel shocks Spaceboy, believing that it killed him. The Seance, on the other hand, is seen in a perception of Heaven with a figure implied to be God, who is depicted as a cowboy. The cowboy implies that the Umbrella Academy is a modern-day incarnation of the Messiah and tells Klaus that he is to return to Earth. Carmichael appears and talks with Number 5. Number 5 threatens his former officer, that is, until he states that he has his biological mother in the eyes of two agents that can kill her if he doesn't finish the Kennedy assassination. Allison is reluctant to travel along, but Carmichael responds by informing them that Number 5's biological mother had twins, revealing that 5 has a biological twin sibling.

=== Issue #4: "A Perfect Life" ===
The fourth issue was released on February 25, 2009.

The issue begins in a dream of Spaceboy's illustrating "a perfect life" by being married to The Rumor and having chimpanzee children. Spaceboy is bewildered when there is a sudden flash. Seconds later, his surroundings and "perfect life" are burnt to ash. The Monocle appears and asks if Spaceboy really thought it would "all turn out all right". Spaceboy wakes up and the story proceeds to Hazel and Cha-Cha's hideaway where Agnes has taken off the shoes (out of respect) of The Séance (leaving him open to use his powers). Hazel and Cha-Cha enter the room where Seance (presumed dead by the duo), a useless Spaceboy, and Agnes are held and reveal to have with them the nuclear explosive codes which Kennedy had given to Hargreeves 17 years ago. The duo activates the codes, only to discover that it has a timer. Seconds later, Cha-Cha pulls out a gun and blasts Hazel's brains out before pulling the trigger on himself. It's revealed that Séance (with God's help) has returned from the dead and that he had possessed Cha-Cha and at the same time disarmed the codes. Meanwhile, at the Perseus Building, the spoiled son of corporate millionaire (Mr. Perseus) is arguing with the board of his corporation on what to do with the fortune that has recently come into his possession. To one of the board member's dismay, he proposes that they invest the money on some experiments and that anyone who tries to get in his way will be killed. The story proceeds to the Corrections Department of The Office At The End Of Time, where Carmichael is discussing tactics to the Temps Aeternalis on how they're to finish the job of assassinating John F. Kennedy which the older Number Five had failed to do. Carmichael reveals the younger Number Five in the front of the room to which Number Five responds not to bother and that the only reason they aren't dead already is that he has decided to help. Later that night, Seance, Spaceboy, and Kraken meet back at the Umbrella Academy where Séance appears to be digging up Pogo's grave. It's revealed that Pogo wasn't buried under his memorial, but rather a Temps Aeternalis agent who tells them (through Séance) that Number Five is planning to go back to 1963, Dallas, to assassinate JFK, which angers Kraken. Séance, Kraken, and Spaceboy use the dead agent's time machine to go back in time. Meanwhile, back in Hazel and Cha-Cha's Hideaway, Body (Inspector Lupo's chimpanzee partner) and a handful of officers are tending to Agnes. Body then hears a beeping sound; Agnes tells him it is the nuclear detonator, ending Chapter Four (and the world).

=== Issue #5: "All the Animals in the Zoo" ===
The fifth issue was released on March 25, 2009.

It begins at sunset, with soldiers marching through a jungle in Vietnam. One soldier is telling a joke, but stops when he can't remember how it goes. Two other soldiers are bringing up the rear, and one remarks that he's very confused about why they're in the jungle; the other reminds him it is because their job is to carry a mummy to Saigon. The first soldier talks about his disdain towards their sergeant, whom he says "stumbled out of the jungle three years back". The sergeant (The Kraken) appears and says that their purpose for being there is to drag the mummified body of an ancient king back to Saigon, so that he can be resurrected and end the war. Suddenly, the soldier who was telling the joke runs back, saying he remembers the end of the joke. Before he can finish his sentence, however, a bullet is shot through his forehead and an ambush on Kraken's unit ensues. As darkness falls, the gunfight turns from a typical Viet Cong ambush to an attack from V.C.Vs (Viet Cong Vampires). As blood is spilled on the carcass of the mummy, he suddenly awakens in a terrible fury, growing to the size of a small skyscraper. Before he can step on the soldiers and start rampaging through the jungle, a blast of fire erupts from the sky and crashes into the mummy's head, killing him. As the unknown attacker lands, a chimpanzee soldier takes aim, but the Sergeant tells him to stand down. The attacker is then revealed to be a bearded Spaceboy. They have a discussion, where Kraken asks Space if he's done feeling sorry for himself. He then says that because The Seance (after transporting them back in time with the stolen Temps Aeternalis time machine) sent them back three years BEFORE Number 5's and Rumor's arrival in Dallas, he's been in Vietnam because "this is the only place that makes sense". Seance then arrives and takes both Kraken and Space back to his nightclub in Saigon. He then tells them they're going to get to Dallas in time, and shows them a newly built Televator. Its construction is being assisted by a young Pogo. Space attempts to inform Pogo of his death, but Pogo stops him, saying that he can't know anything about the future. Seance then hands an elderly lady a baby that he'd been carrying around, and Space asks if it's his baby, to which Seance confirms, much to Space's disbelief. The Televator then zaps them through time. The next scene shows Number 5 and Rumor, along with several Temps agents, in the back of a truck. Number 5 lays out their battle plan, instructing that no one is to hurt his past self and that they just have to convince him to kill Kennedy. They all then bust out the back of the truck, and as Number 5 marches up the steps he says, "Let's go kill us a president".

=== Issue #6: "The World is Big Enough Without You" ===
The sixth issue was released on April 25, 2009.

In Dallas, a young-looking Number Five along with a group of Temps Aeternalis Soldiers are attempting to convince a much older-looking Number Five to assassinate JFK. Many Temps are murdered in the process, until one finally manages to wound Number Five (who has gone against his orders, as his younger-looking self may be killed in the process). The Temps inform Number Five that there has been a change of plans, at which point Spaceboy, Kraken, and Seance arrive to assist. Spaceboy asks the younger Number Five where Rumor is, to which Number Five responds "Nowhere you can reach her". Spaceboy picks him up by his head and threatens to pop it if he doesn't talk. Spaceboy then orders the older Number Five to do what he came here to do (assassinate all the other shooters who were to be involved in the Kennedy assassination); he then leaves via time machine on one of the dead Temps. Number Five then reveals that killing him won't save the president, that of every murder he's committed, Kennedy is something special. With help from Rumor taking Mrs. Kennedy's place, the assassination is carried out. The story proceeds to a hospital where a "shocked" Mrs. Kennedy is being questioned and asking questions of her own. A disguised Rumor exits the hospital and enters a time machine (disguised as an ambulance) where the rest of her siblings are already waiting. Spaceboy is led to believe that in exchange for her voice back, Rumor would assassinate the president; Spaceboy responds with disappointment. Rumor then reveals that had she not done what the Temps had told her to, they would have shot and murdered one of the academy's biological mothers; she also reveals that he and Number Five are in fact twins. She further tells Spaceboy that she only did it because she loves him. The ambulance takes them back to their present time where, to their surprise, everything remains the same, to which Spaceboy leaves the team again and Carmichael is present. Carmichael states that everything the team did were "corrections", that the point of everything was to maintain the status quo. He also reveals that they truly saved the world as a team (this time) as due to the assassination of Kennedy, they prevented him from giving Hargreeves the missiles and nukes which Hazel and Cha-Cha had stolen and used earlier in the series. Number Five then destroys the fishbowl head in which Carmichael is kept, and as payback for placing the genes of every killer and murderer inside him, he swallows Carmichael. The academy parts ways yet again. Seance visits a bar and using a jukebox, plays a song which matches the chapter's title (The World Is Big Enough Without You). Rumor returns home to comfort her sister Vanya (implying that she has forgiven her for her actions in Apocalypse Suite). Kraken looks at an old picture of him and his unit from when he and his brothers were in Vietnam. The whereabouts of Spaceboy are unknown. Number Five eats ice cream on the sidewalk with his dog. Reaching for his pocket, he takes out the small Earth piece missing from his diagram at the beginning of the chapter.

== Collected editions ==
The trade paperback features the "Dallas" series as well as the short story "Anywhere But Here" and nine pages of sketches and artwork (192 pages). A hardback limited-edition version with 232 pages was released on October 21, 2009, and is available in comic stores. There is an error on page 173 'Designing the Umbrella Academy: Dallas' where the note at the bottom stated 'We wanted an early teaser image for the series, and played on the fact that Dallas #1 would come out within days of the thirty-fifth anniversary of Kennedy's death'. This should have read the forty-fifth not thirty-fifth.

== Sources ==
- The Umbrella Academy: Dallas; complete collection(all issues)
