= Professional Griefers =

2012 single by Deadmau5 and Gerard Way

Single by Deadmau5 featuring Gerard Way

from the album Album Title Goes Here
- Released: August 14, 2012
- Genre: Electro house
- Length: 4:03
- Label: Mau5trap; Ultra; Parlophone
- Songwriters: Joel Zimmerman; Gerard Way
- Producer: Deadmau5

Deadmau5 singles chronology
"The Veldt" (2012)	"Professional Griefers" (2012)	"Channel 42" (2013)

Gerard Way singles chronology
"Professional Griefers" (2012)	"No Shows" (2014)

Music video
- "Professional Griefers" on YouTube

"Professional Griefers" is a song by the Canadian musician Deadmau5 (Joel Zimmerman) from his fourth studio album, Album Title Goes Here (2012). It features the American musician Gerard Way, the frontman of the American rock band My Chemical Romance. A electro house song with punk rock influence, Zimmerman would often perform an instrumental of "Professional Griefers" during his live performances before its release. The song was written by Zimmerman and Way, and was produced by the former.

In March 2012, the song was leaked online before its proper release. Despite the leak, Zimmerman and Way didn't confirm that they performed on it. It was later released as the lead single from Album Title Goes Here on August 14, 2012, through Ultra Records, and was subsequently released in the United Kingdom on September 2 through Mau5trap and Parlophone. "Professional Griefers" received divided reviews from music critics, with many criticizing Way's vocals, while others praised its energy.

A music video for the song, directed by Paul Boyd and Jeff Ranasinghe, was released in August 2012, taking place during a futuristic Ultimate Fighting Championship (UFC) match between Zimmerman and Way. Costing over a million dollars to produce, it is the most expensive electronic dance video ever made. "Professional Griefers" peaked at number 9 on the Global Dance Songs chart, and was performed by Zimmerman and Way during the 2012 iHeartRadio Festival.

== Background and release ==
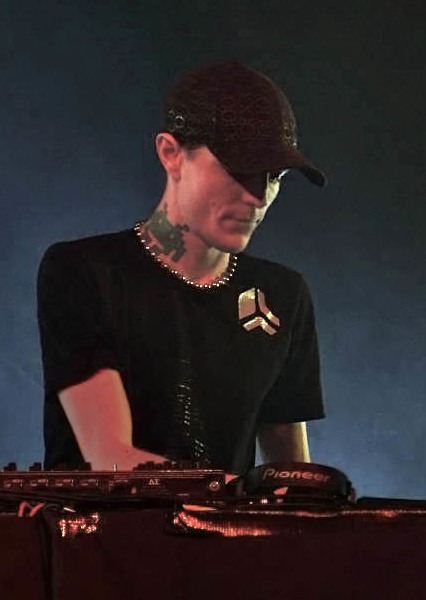
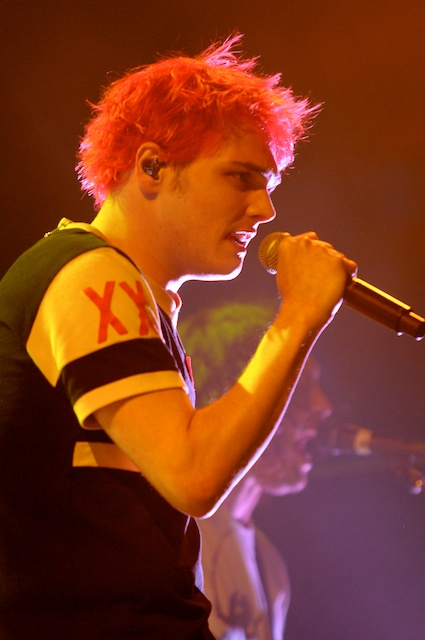
"Professional Griefers" was written by both Deadmau5 (Joel Zimmerman, left, pictured in 2009) and Gerard Way (right, pictured in 2011)

During his live performances, Deadmau5 (Joel Zimmerman) would often perform an instrumental version of an unreleased song, titled "Professional Griefers", approximately a year before its release. In March 2012, "Professional Griefers" leaked online, featuring vocals from Gerard Way of the American rock band My Chemical Romance. Despite the track being leaked, neither Zimmerman or Way confirmed that they appeared on it. The leak occurred the same week that Zimmerman commented on a website: "I don't usually enjoy the idea of a 'collaboration' [...] although you can rest assure whatever collaborations I have done in the past were the results of stuff I'm totally into, like Flipside, Foo Fighters, Cypress Hill, etc." He later commented on the collaboration with Way: "This was cool because I enjoy the kid. It was a really good fit. Gerard is a really great dude and I’d totally hang with him." and that "I felt it was a kind of cool collab, because we could both break out of that entirely and just do this one thing that was like our forces combined." Both artists recorded the song in Los Angeles, California, at Way's friends' studio. The song was written by Zimmerman and Way, and the former served as producer.

Following its leak, "Professional Griefers" was announced as the fifth track on Zimmerman's fourth studio album, Album Title Goes Here, and was released as part of the album on September 24, 2012. The song released as the lead single from the album on August 14, 2012 in the United States through Ultra Records. In the United Kingdom, it was released on September 2, 2012, through Mau5trap and Parlophone. During the 2012 iHeartRadio Festival, Way joined Zimmerman on stage to perform the track together.

== Composition and lyrics ==
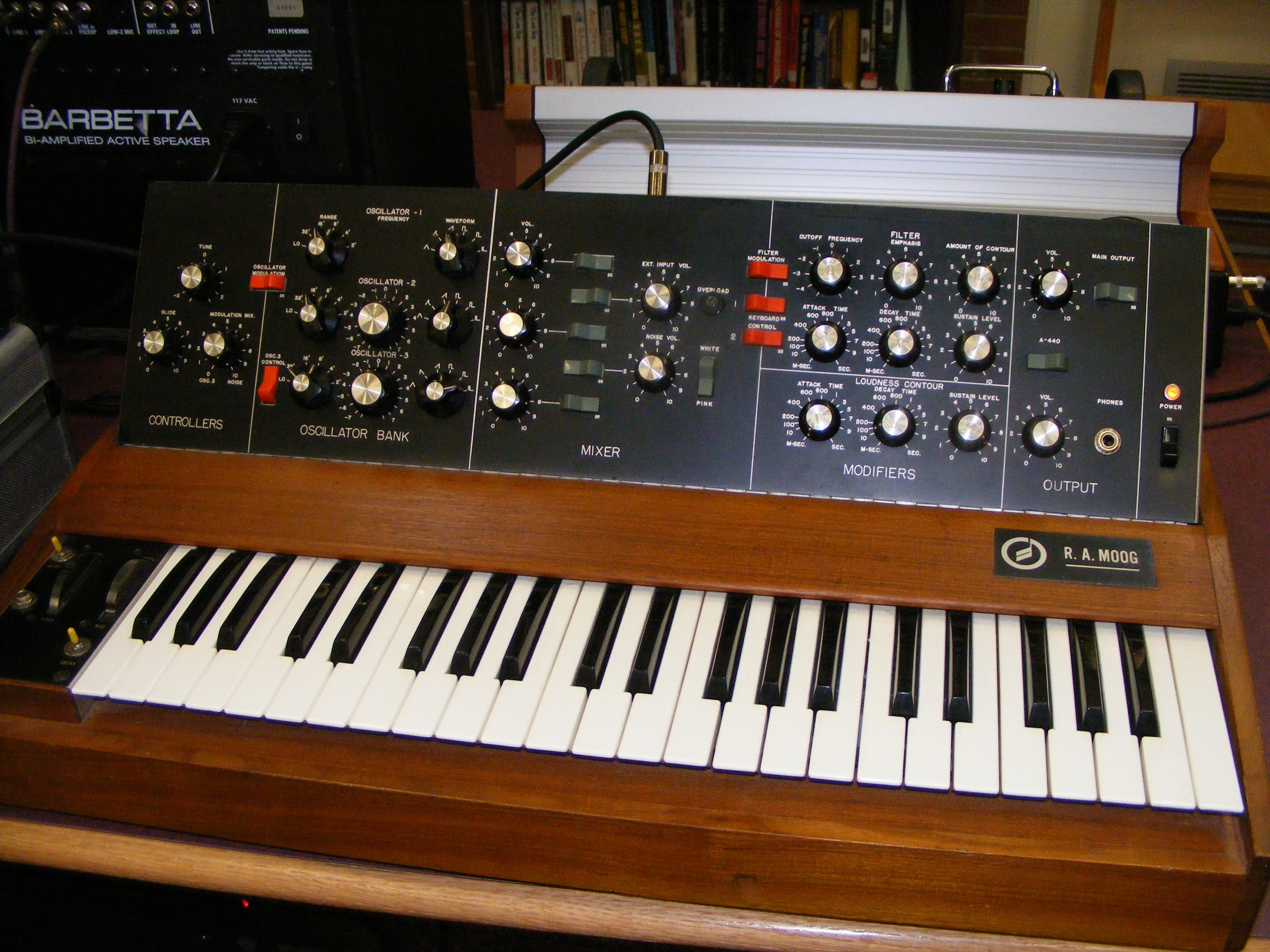
"Professional Griefers" features a "tightly orchestrated" synthesizer (example pictured), and also has "stomping beats and heavily distorted guitar stabs" throughout it.

"Professional Griefers" is an electro house song with a length of four minutes and three seconds. Elements of the song are inspired by punk rock, with James Shotwell of Under the Gun Review stating that "the latest jam from Deadmau5 has all the fury of a punk rock club packed into a dancefloor ready beat." Nick Levine of NME cited it as a dance song, meanwhile the staff at Billboard described it as a "stomping disco—punk jam". David Jeffries of AllMusic mentioned in a review of Album Title Goes Here that Way gives "Professional Griefers" his "full goth swagger." Instrumentally, the song begins with "stomping beats and heavily distorted guitar stabs", building up into the chorus with "discordant synth strikes". It features a catchy tune with "a chugging digital bassline" according to MTV's Zachary Swickey, and also provides a synthesizer that was described by Heather McDaid of DIY as "tightly orchestrated".

Lyrically, the chorus includes lyrics like "Give me the sound to see / Another world outside that's full of / All the broken things that I made." The word "griefers" from the song's title refers to people in multiplayer video games who "deliberately harass other players in the game, usually in the most annoying ways possible," such as verbally abusing players, killing other players, siding with opponents, or crashing game servers.

== Critical reception ==
"Professional Griefers" received mixed reviews from music critics. Megan Farokhmanesh, writing for Paste, wrote that the song " bounds between perfectly pumpable to ear-grating", praising its energy and calling Way's vocals "frantic". In contrast, Darryl G. Wright of PopMatters labelled the song as "one of the least enjoyable" on the album. He criticized Way's vocals, saying the listener would wish "the vocals would continue on longer", and calling them "ill-conceived"; Brandon Soderberg of Spin similarly stated Way "should try a little harder", claiming the song makes "a strong contender for worst song of the year". Nonetheless, A staff writer at Sputnikmusic noted that Way "might feel a little out of his depth" on the song, but claims he finds a way to make "Professional Griefers work", stating "its electro-schlok impulses firing tectonic slabs of pure adrenaline". Alexis Petridis of The Guardian described "Professional Griefers" as "the soundtrack for a film that hasn't been made yet". The American television channel Fuse included "Professional Griefers" in its list of "The 40 Best Songs of 2012" at number 19.

== Commercial performance ==
In the United States, "Professional Griefers" debuted at number 13 on the Dance Digital Song Sales chart on September 1, 2012. It also peaked at number 28 on the Alternative Airplay chart, number 22 on the Dance Airplay, and number 30 on the Hot Dance/Electronic Songs chart. In the United Kingdom, it reached number 81 on the UK Singles chart.

In Canada, the song reached a position of number 51 on the Digital Song Sales chart the week of September 1, 2012, and peaked at number 66 on the Canadian Hot 100. It also reached number 77 on the Japan Hot 100 chart the week of October 20, 2012. In Belgium, it reached number 2 on the Dance Bubbling Under chart, 50 on the regular Dance chart, and number 74 on the Ultratip charts. On October 20, 2012, the song reached number 9 on the Global Dance Songs chart.

== Music video ==
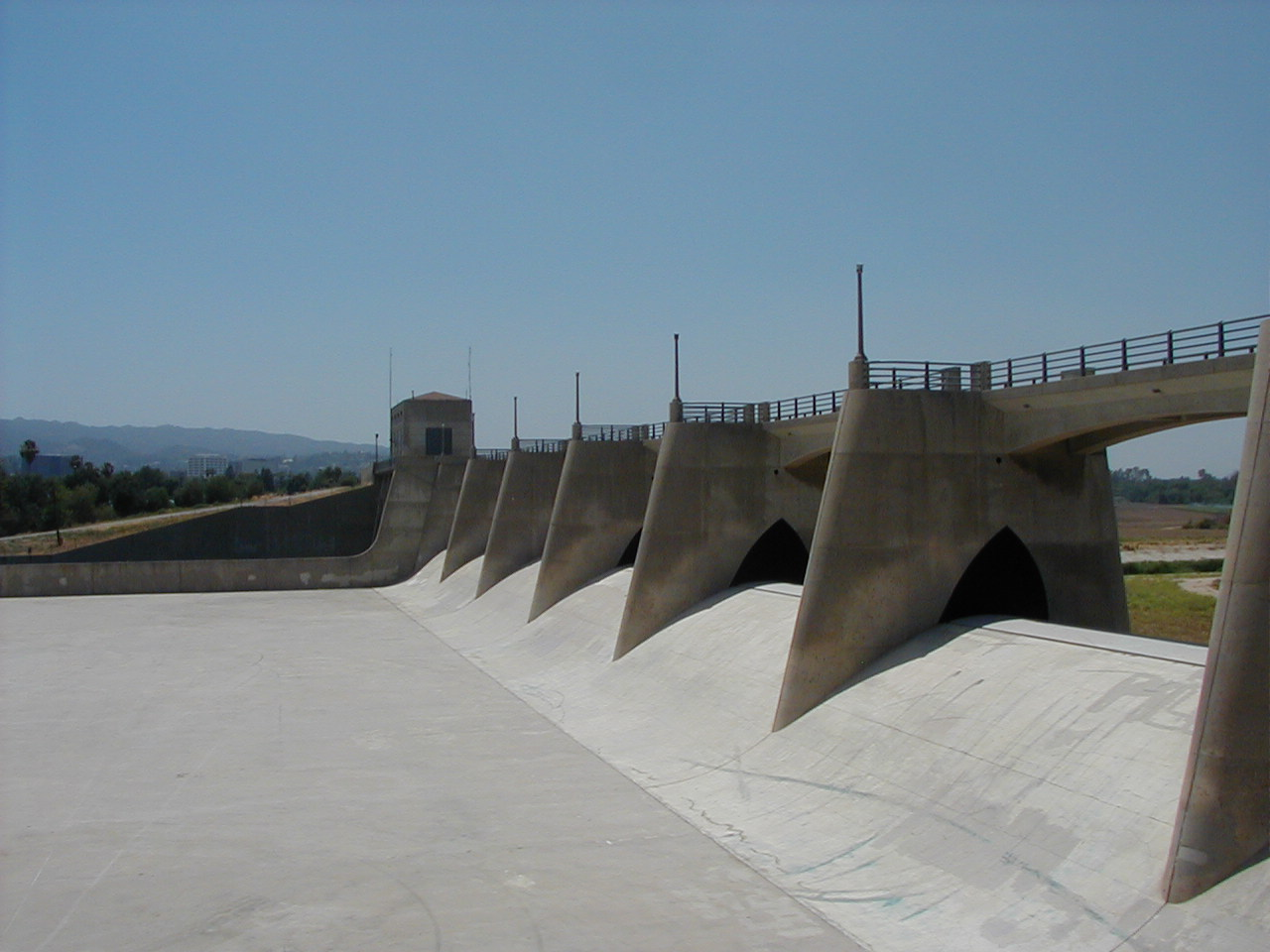
Sepulveda Dam, the filming location of the music video.

The music video for "Professional Griefers" was directed by Paul Boyd and Jeff Ranasinghe, and was produced by Weapons of Mass Entertainment. It was recorded at the Sepulveda Dam in May 2012, outside of Los Angeles. The video follows a confrontation between Zimmerman and Way, who both participate to fight in a futuristic Ultimate Fighting Championship (UFC) match. They battle one-another via remote control robots, with a ring announcer monitoring them throughout. The video ends with the robots "crashing down" onto the crowd; Zimmerman explained the ending was a "coup de grace with Way" in the making of the video. Rolling Stone India compared the music video to Real Steel (2011). Zimmerman cited classic video games as influences, specifically the 1990s Japanese game Chrono Trigger, commenting: "There's a robot in there called Gato, which is like a big, chubby fighting training robot. So you'd go into a battle in the game with this robot, and it would basically train you. I really wanted [the robots in the music video] to have that look, to be ungainly and post-apocalyptic." It costed over a million dollars to produce, making it the most expensive electronic dance video ever made.

The music video for "Professional Griefers" was uploaded to YouTube on August 29, 2012. and was well-received by critics. Levine deemed it as "epic", meanwhile James Montgomery of MTV considered it to be "really griefy" and "brilliant", writing "Professional Griefers" is intentionally thumbing its nose at the way videos are made today, and it's doing so in the most blatant way possible."

== Credits and personnel ==
Credits are adapted from Apple Music.

- Deadmau5 – remixer, programming, songwriter, producer
- Gerard Way – songwriter

== Charts ==
Chart performance for "Professional Griefers"
Chart (2012)	Peak position
Belgium (Ultratip Flanders)	74
Belgium Dance (Ultratop Flanders)	50
Belgium Dance Bubbling Under (Ultratip Flanders)	2
Canadian Digital Song Sales (Billboard)	51
Canadian Hot 100 (Billboard)	66
Global Dance Songs (Billboard)	9
Japan Hot 100 (Billboard)	77
UK Singles Chart (Official Charts Company)	81
US Alternative Airplay (Billboard)	28
US Dance Digital Song Sales (Billboard)	13
US Dance Airplay (Billboard)	22
US Hot Dance/Electronic Songs (Billboard)	30
