= Getting Down the Germs =

2018 single by Gerard Way

Single by Gerard Way
- Released: November 16, 2018
- Genre: Indie rock
- Length: 4:51
- Label: Reprise
- Songwriters: Gerard Way; Ray Toro; Doug McKean; Sara Andon
- Producers: Gerard Way; Doug McKean; Ray Toro

Gerard Way singles chronology
"Baby You're a Haunted House" (2018)	"Getting Down the Germs" (2018)	"Dasher" (2018)

"Getting Down the Germs" is a song by the American singer-songwriter Gerard Way. It was released as a standalone single on November 16, 2018, through Reprise Records. An indie rock song, it focuses on pushing through harder aspects of life. Backed by guitar riffs, it features a flute that Way had long wanted to include in a song. It was the second song Way wrote with My Chemical Romance bandmate Ray Toro, following "Into the Cave We Wander". The song was written by Way, Toro, Doug McKean, and Sara Andon, and was produced by McKean, Way and Toro.

Upon release, "Getting Down the Germs" received positive reviews from music critics, with many of them praising its composition and highlighting the flute melody. Many of them also stated that "Getting Down the Germs" sounded like a form of classic rock, such as Alternative Press's Jason Pettigrew, who claimed it "sounds like a hybrid mix of '70s-rock". It was accompanied by a music video, directed by Claire Marie Vogel, of fuzzy germs dancing along to the track.

== Background and production ==
In March 2018, Gerard Way revealed he was working on new music, after releasing the extended play (EP) "Pinkish" / "Don't Try" and the single "Into the Cave We Wander" in 2016. (Note: "Into the Cave We Wander" was also released in 2017 as part of Record Store Day.) In a press release, Way stated that he had "been wanting [to write] a song that featured the flute prominently for quite some time", mentioning in an interview with Forbes that he was inspired by bands like King Crimson and Jethro Tull. While constructing "Getting Down the Germs", Way saw that the song had "all these chilled-out little spaces in it", and decided to fill them with flutes. The title for the song came from Way's editor, who said to him to "Just get the germs down. Just the germs of the ideas." "Getting Down the Germs" was written by Way, Toro, Doug McKean, and Sara Andon. McKean mixed the song, and produced it along with Way and Toro. Michelle Mancini mastered it. It was the second song written by Way and Toro, following "Into the Cave We Wander".

== Composition and lyrics ==
Musically, "Getting Down the Germs" has been labeled as a indie rock song by critics; it has a length of four minutes and fifty-one seconds. A writer at DIY noted that it continued his Britpop roots, making a comparison to Blur. Graham Hartmann of Loudwire stated that it was "reminiscent of '60s psychedelic music and new school indie rock", and Jason Pettigrew of Alternative Press mentioned it "sounds like a hybrid mix of '70s-rock", comparing it to the Rolling Stones and Traffic. The song features "jangling riffs" and "bongo flourishes" beneath Way's vocals, building up to a flute solo over the course of its length. Regarding its lyrics, Way discussed that "Getting Down the Germs" centers around getting through the harder things in life, and claimed that the song reminded him "of wiggling squiggling wormy germs".

== Release and reception ==
"Getting Down the Germs" was released following his previous single, "Baby You're a Haunted House", on November 16, 2018, through Reprise Records. A music video, directed by Claire Marie Vogel, was also released alongside the song, featuring clips of fuzzy germs dancing along to the track.

"Getting Down the Germs" received positive reviews from music critics. Scott Munroe of Louder referred to it as a "laid-back" track, while Sarah Murphy of Exclaim! claimed it sounded "straight out of the '90s". Charlotte Krol, writing for NME, called it "catchy" and praised its composition, stating it was a "catchy indie track replete with a psych flute and jangling riffs." Zac Gelfand of Consequence discussed the song's composition, writing "It seems that with every new solo release, Way gets further and further away from his roots".

Billboard's Nicole Engelman named it "infectious", praising the flute melody by stating "Way stays true to his punk rock roots, while simultaneously taking the song into uncharted territory by including a flute melody, revisiting the great rock-music flute solos of the '60s and '70s." Hartmann acclaimed the way Way fit the flute into the song, writing it "really bring you back to rock's golden age" and also claimed it was a "stripped-down, feel-good song".

== Credits and personnel ==
Credits are adapted from the digital liner notes.

Musicians

- Gerard Way – lead vocals, guitar, songwriter, producer
- Ray Toro – bass, drums, songwriter, producer
- Sara Andon – flute, songwriter

Technicals

- Doug McKean – recording engineer, mixing engineer, songwriter, producer
- Michelle Mancini – mastering engineer
