= No Shows =

Single by Gerard Way

from the album Hesitant Alien
- Released: August 18, 2014
- Recorded: Lightning Sound (California), Sonic Ranch (Texas), 2013
- Length: 4:12
- Label: Warner Bros.
- Songwriters: Gerard Way; Ian Fowles
- Producer: Doug McKean

Gerard Way singles chronology
"Professional Griefers" (2012)	"No Shows" (2014)	"Millions" (2014)

Music video
- "No Shows" on YouTube

"No Shows" is a song by American musician and My Chemical Romance frontman Gerard Way. The song was released by Warner Bros. Records on August 18, 2014 as the first single from Way's debut studio album, Hesitant Alien. "No Shows" was released to radio on August 25, 2014.

== Music video ==
A teaser for the music video was released on August 15, 2014, entitled "Pink Station Zero", was uploaded to Way's official YouTube channel. On August 19, the song's official music video was released and was directed by Jennifer Juniper Stratford. The video depicts Way and his band performing the song on the fictional intergalactic music show, "Pink Station Zero".

== Personnel ==
- Gerard Way – vocals, guitar, additional bass, percussion
- Ian Fowles – guitar
- Matt Gorney – bass
- Jamie Muhoberac – keyboards
- Jarrod Alexander – drums
- Jason Freese – horn

== Charts ==
Chart (2014)	Peak position
Billboard Rock Digital Songs	42
Mexico Airplay (Billboard)	45
