= Hesitant Alien =

2014 album by Gerard Way

Studio album by Gerard Way
- Released: September 29, 2014
- Recorded: 2014
- Studios: Lightning Sound Studio (Hidden Hills, California); Sonic Ranch (Tornillo, Texas)
- Genres: Alternative rock; Britpop; pop; shoegaze
- Length: 38:51
- Labels: Warner Bros.; Reprise
- Producer: Doug McKean

Alternative cover
- Original vinyl cover

Singles from Hesitant Alien
- 1. "No Shows" Released: August 18, 2014; 2. "Millions" Released: November 17, 2014

Hesitant Alien is the debut solo studio album by Gerard Way, lead singer of the American rock band My Chemical Romance, released in the US on September 29, 2014, and on September 30 worldwide. It was officially announced in May 2014, although demos of the songs "Zero Zero" and "Millions" have circulated since 2012. The album was produced by Doug McKean, known for his work as recording engineer on a number of projects with producer Rob Cavallo, including several releases by My Chemical Romance. Hesitant Alien received mostly positive reviews, and was a moderate commercial success reaching No. 16 on the US Billboard 200 and appearing on some international charts. To support the album, Way assembled a touring band, "The Hormones".

== Background ==
On March 22, 2013, My Chemical Romance officially disbanded. This was followed by the release of a greatest hits album, entitled May Death Never Stop You a year later. Having recently signed with Warner Bros. Records, Way went on to announce the beginning of his solo career with the release of an advance-single, "Action Cat", on June 11, 2014. This was accompanied by a new website featuring concept artwork for the album and a new logo. The album's first single, "No Shows", was released on August 18, 2014. "Millions", the second single, was released on November 17, anticipated by a music video released on October 6.

== Release and promotion ==
"No Shows" was released to radio on August 25, 2014. Hesitant Alien was released on September 29, in the UK, and a day later in the U.S. Pre-orders for both the vinyl and CD versions of the album became available in August, featuring a T-shirt and promotional zine created specifically for the pre-orders. On September 29, 2014, Way premiered Hesitant Alien on the online platform VyRT during a listening party with album commentary. The following month, Way and The Hormones appeared as the musical guest on an episode of Conan. They also toured extensively throughout the world in 2014 and 2015, and performed at several festivals. In February and March 2015, Way performed at Soundwave festival in Australia. On Record Store Day 2016, Way released two exclusive, unreleased tracks from Hesitant Alien titled "Don't Try" and "Pinkish".

== Critical reception ==
Professional ratings
Aggregate scores
Source	Rating
AnyDecentMusic?	6.4/10
Metacritic	75/100
Review scores
Source	Rating
AllMusic	4/5 stars
Alternative Press	4/5 stars
American Songwriter	4/5 stars
Billboard	3/5 stars
The Guardian	4/5 stars
Mojo	3/5 stars
NME	8/10
The Observer	3/5 stars
Q	3/5 stars
Rolling Stone	3/5 stars

Hesitant Alien received generally positive reviews from critics. At Metacritic, which assigns a normalized rating out of 100 to reviews from mainstream critics, the album has an average score of 75 out of 100, which indicates "Generally favorable reviews" based on 15 reviews. David McLaughlin from Rock Sound magazine stated that some of the songs from the album were some of the best Way has written to date, labelling the album as alternative rock. He also stated that it is nothing like the efforts made into the albums of My Chemical Romance. Jason Pettigrew from Alternative Press said: "Now in his late-30s, he’s going back to the things that turned him on, pretentious ’70s glam-rock, fractured ’80s post-punk and all the English sonic conventions of ’90s Britpop and shoegazer noise", and that the album "has enough requisite cool and clamor to insure [sic] he stays both relevant and remarkably vibrant".

Hesitant Alien topped the "Ten Essential Albums Of 2014" list in Alternative Press. The album was included at number 24 on Rock Sound's "Top 50 Albums of the Year" list. The album was included at number 4 on Kerrang!'s "The Top 50 Rock Albums Of 2014" list.

== Track listing ==
All tracks are written by Gerard Way, except where noted.

No.	Title	Writer(s)	Length
1.	"The Bureau"		2:38
2.	"Action Cat"		3:07
3.	"No Shows"	Way; Ian Fowles	4:12
4.	"Brother"		4:31
5.	"Millions"	Way; James Dewees	3:28
6.	"Zero Zero"		2:49
7.	"Juarez"	Way; Fowles; Don Blum	2:50
8.	"Drugstore Perfume"		4:50
9.	"Get the Gang Together"	Way; Don Blum	3:40
10.	"How It's Going to Be"	Way; Jamie Muhoberac	3:44
11.	"Maya the Psychic"		3:02
Total length:			38:51

Japanese bonus track
No.	Title	Length
12.	"Television All the Time"	3:34
Total length:		42:25

== Personnel ==
- Gerard Way – vocals, guitar (all tracks); percussion (1–3, 8–11), bass guitar (1, 3, 4), piano (2, 4), keyboards (10)
- Ian Fowles – guitar (all tracks), percussion (9)
- Matt Gorney – bass guitar (all except 1), piano (1), guitars (4), percussion (9), additional vocals (5)
- Jarrod Alexander – drums (all tracks), percussion (1, 2, 6, 9)
- Jamie Muhoberac – keyboards (1, 3, 4, 6, 8–10)
- Jason Freese – horn (3, 9)
- Tom Rasulo – percussion (2)
- Mikey Way – additional vocals (5)
- Sabina Olague – spoken word (7)

=== Production ===
- Doug McKean – production
- Tom Rasulo – engineer
- Andrew Law – assistant engineer
- Gerardo "Jerry" Ordonez – assistant engineer
- Zach Mauldin – assistant engineer
- Lance Sumner – assistant engineer
- Tchad Blake – mixing
- Bob Ludwig – mastering
- Gerard Way – art direction
- Norman Wonderly – art direction

== Charts ==
2014 chart performance
Chart (2014)	Peak position
Australian Albums (ARIA)	29
Irish Albums (IRMA)	17
Japanese Top Albums Sales (Billboard Japan)	95
Mexican Albums (Top 100 Mexico)	74
New Zealand Albums (RMNZ)	37
Scottish Albums (Official Charts)	13
UK Albums (Official Charts)	14
UK Rock & Metal Albums (Official Charts)	1
US Billboard 200	16
US Indie Store Album Sales (Billboard)	14
US Top Alternative Albums (Billboard)	1
US Top Rock Albums (Billboard)	4

2022 chart performance
Chart (2022)	Peak position
US Indie Store Album Sales (Billboard)	10

== Release history ==
Release dates and formats
Region	Date	Label	Format	Catalog
Worldwide	September 30, 2014	Warner Bros.	DL	—N/a
Worldwide	September 29, 2014	Reprise	CD	9362493721
Worldwide	September 29, 2014	Reprise	LP	9362493722
