= List of songs recorded by My Chemical Romance =

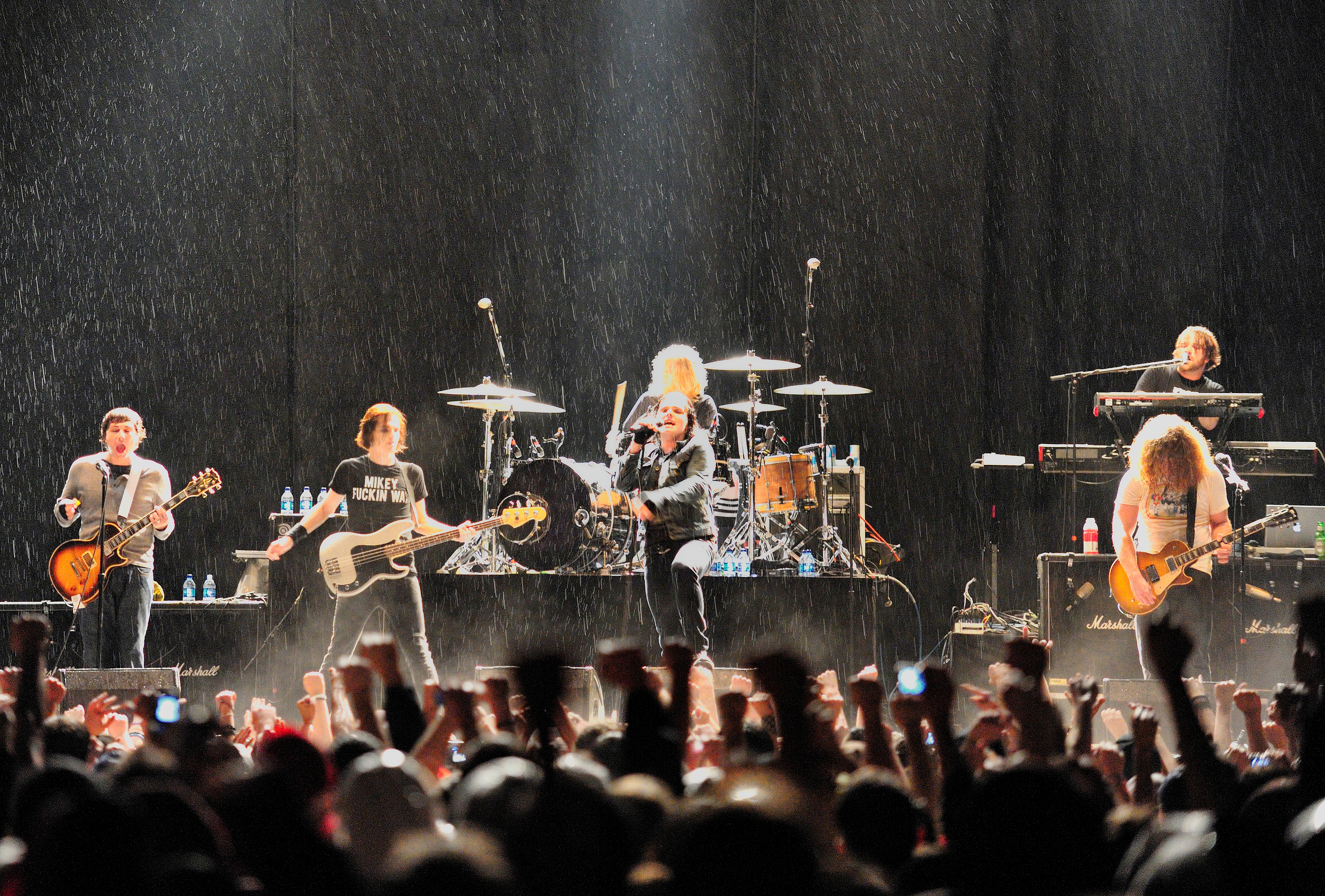
My Chemical Romance in 2008. From left to right: Frank Iero, Mikey Way, Bob Bryar, Gerard Way and Ray Toro.

The American rock band My Chemical Romance has recorded over 90 songs during their career, which includes extended plays (EPs) demos, and covers. The band was formed in New Jersey in September 2001, and signed a contract with record label Eyeball Records, releasing their debut album, I Brought You My Bullets, You Brought Me Your Love, in July 2002. It is considered an emo, post-hardcore, punk rock, and pop-punk album, with additional influences from hardcore punk, heavy metal, and horror punk. The album's lyrics and themes center around depression and suicide, with some fans considering it to be a concept album, revolving around a story based on two lovers inspired by Bonnie and Clyde.

In August 2003, the band left Eyeball and signed a deal with Reprise Records. Their second studio album, Three Cheers for Sweet Revenge, takes influences from emo, alternative rock, pop-punk, post-hardcore, punk rock, and pop rock. It was released in June 2004 and features a more polished sound than their debut. Three Cheers for Sweet Revenge was originally supposed to be a concept album, serving as a continuation of the story of "Demolition Lovers", a song from I Brought You My Bullets, You Brought Me Your Love. Following the death of the characters, the duo would be separated, with one in heaven and the other in hell, only able to reunite if the male partner could harvest one thousand souls. However, Gerard Way revealed that his grandmother's passing resulted in the band wondering how they would tackle the concept, concluding that he would only write songs that he felt like writing.

Their third studio album, The Black Parade, was released in October 2006. It is a concept album that focuses on the story of a man dying of cancer, known as "the Patient", as he nears the end of his life and goes on a journey to the afterlife, reflecting on his life and the traumas that went along with it throughout his journey. The Black Parade is an emo, alternative rock, pop-punk, hard rock, punk rock, glam rock, progressive rock, and post-hardcore album, also including several influences from 1970s classic rock that had not previously been present on Three Cheers for Sweet Revenge. The album contains some of the band's most well-known songs, including "Welcome to the Black Parade", "Teenagers", and "Famous Last Words", often referred to as some of the best songs in the band's discography as a whole.

My Chemical Romance began to work on their fourth studio album in June 2009. Unlike the band's previous works, they wanted to create a "straight-ahead rock 'n' roll record" with no story or characters, and songs that worked better in party settings. Eventually, the band scrapped the project because they were unsatisfied with the result, and later released the scrapped recordings throughout 2012 to 2013 under the name Conventional Weapons. The band released their fourth studio album, Danger Days: The True Lives of the Fabulous Killjoys, in November 2010. Danger Days is a rock opera that is based around the fictional lives of the Killjoys, a group of rebellions living in a post-apocalyptic California in the year 2019. It includes elements of alternative rock, pop-punk, power pop, pop rock, glam rock, and electronic rock. After the band completed touring for Danger Days, they began to work on their fifth studio album in early 2012, with the working title The Paper Kingdom. The Paper Kingdom was intended to be a concept album, telling the story of a support group of parents whose children had died, and would make up a narrative about how their children were lost in the woods fighting against a witch. The band would later breakup in March 2013, leaving The Paper Kingdom left unfinished. One of its intended songs, "Fake Your Death", was later included in the band's greatest hits album May Death Never Stop You (2014), promoted as the band's final song.

After announcing their reunion in 2019, My Chemical Romance returned with "The Foundations of Decay" in May 2022. Its composition was praised by several critics, (Note: Attributed to multiple references:) with its lyrics reflecting on the band's origins and legacy. Musically, the song incorporates elements from doom metal, basement punk, arena rock, post-metal, metalcore, and noise rock, having been compared to ones found on I Brought You My Bullets, You Brought Me Your Love. In July 2025, during their Long Live The Black Parade tour, My Chemical Romance performed an unreleased track from The Paper Kingdom, titled "War Beneath the Rain".

== Released songs ==
Key
†	Indicates song released as a single
‡	Indicates songs not written by My Chemical Romance

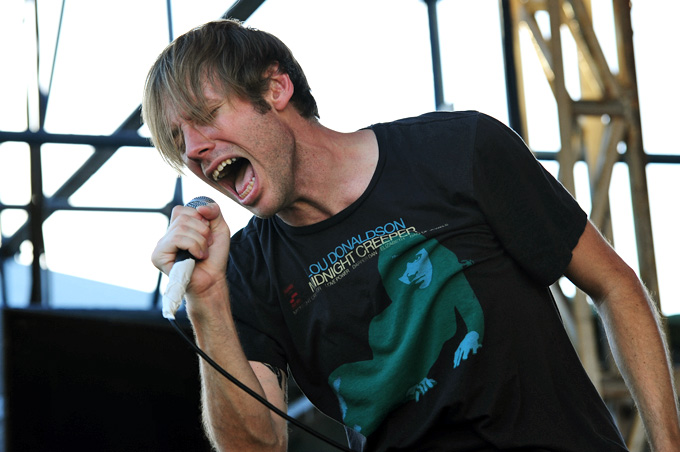
My Chemical Romance first worked with Thursday frontman Geoff Rickly (pictured in 2012) in 2002 to produce their debut album, I Brought You My Bullets, You Brought Me Your Love.

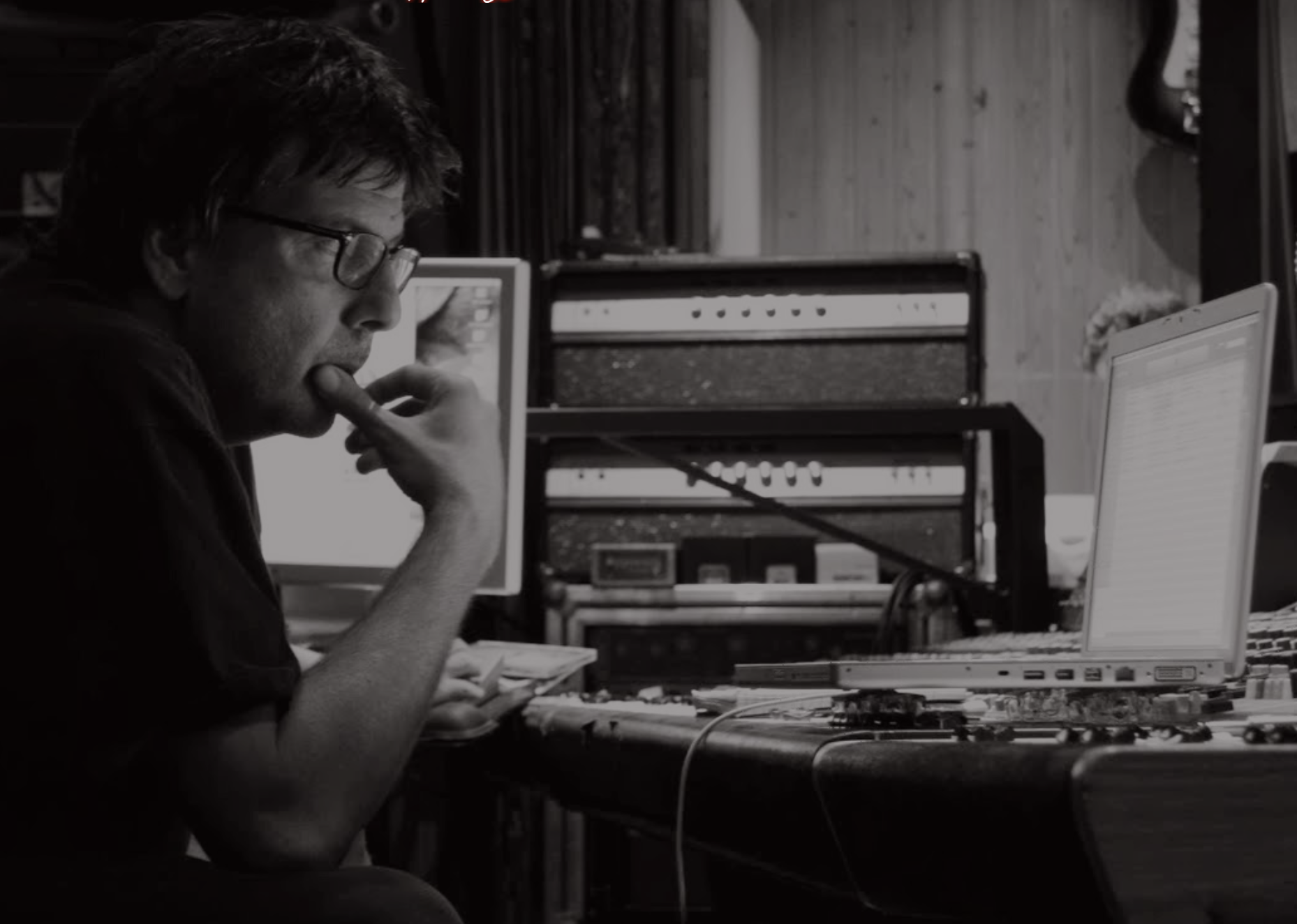
Howard Benson (pictured in 2017) produced the band's second album, Three Cheers for Sweet Revenge (2004).

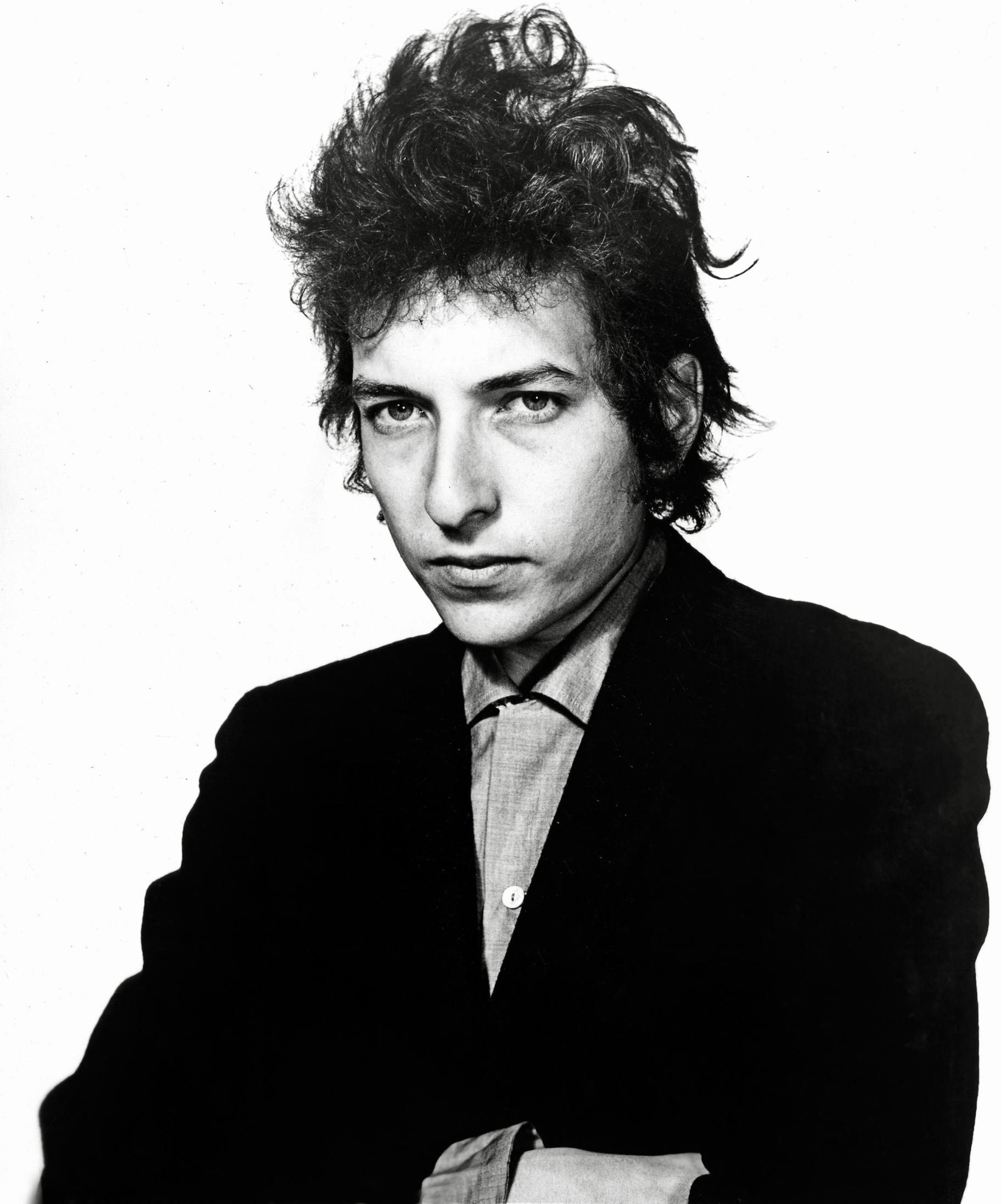
My Chemical Romance recorded a cover of the Bob Dylan (pictured in 1965) song, "Desolation Row", in 2009.

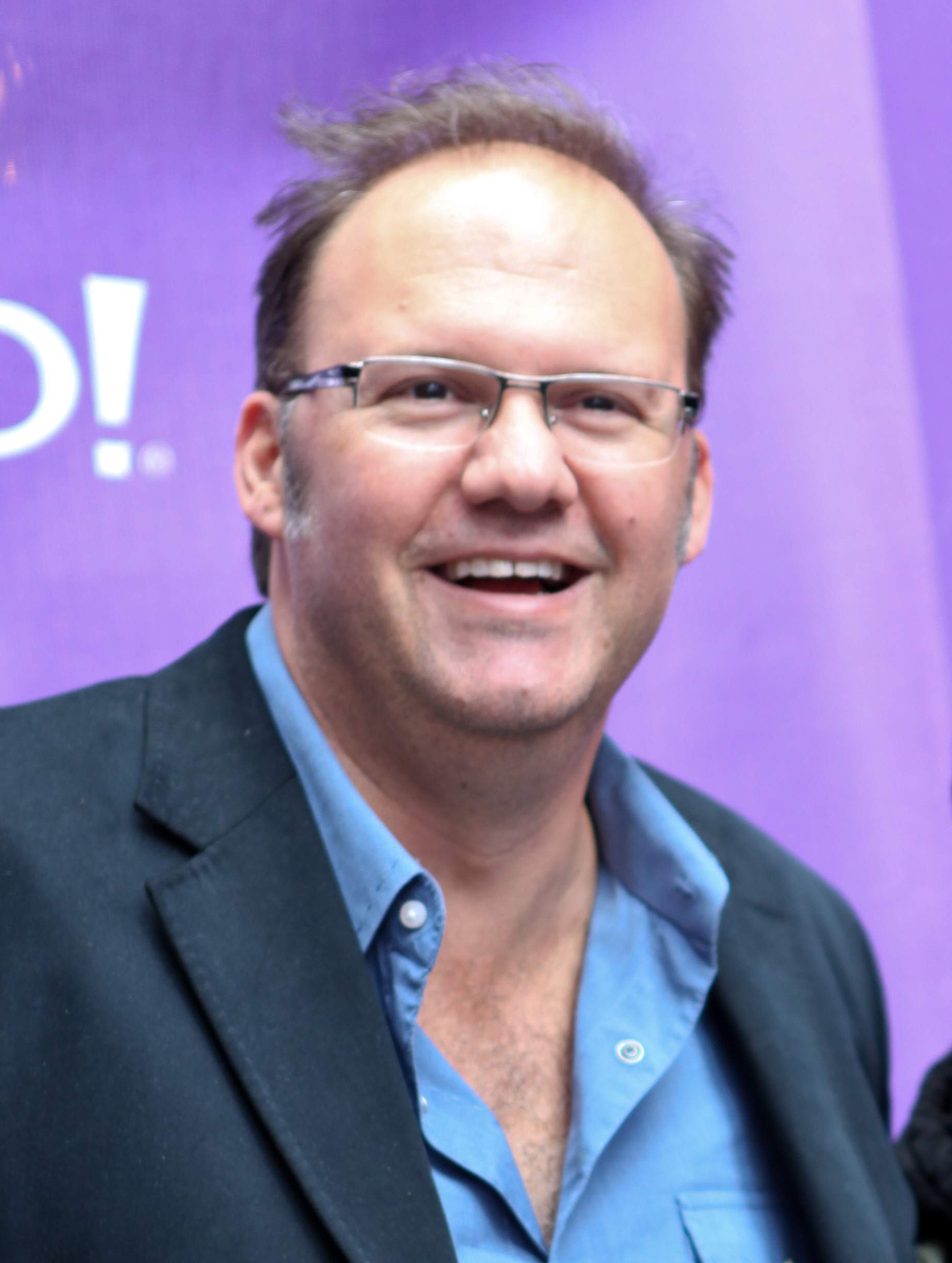
Rob Cavallo (pictured in 2009) contributed to The Black Parade (2006) and Danger Days: The True Lives of the Fabulous Killjoys (2010).

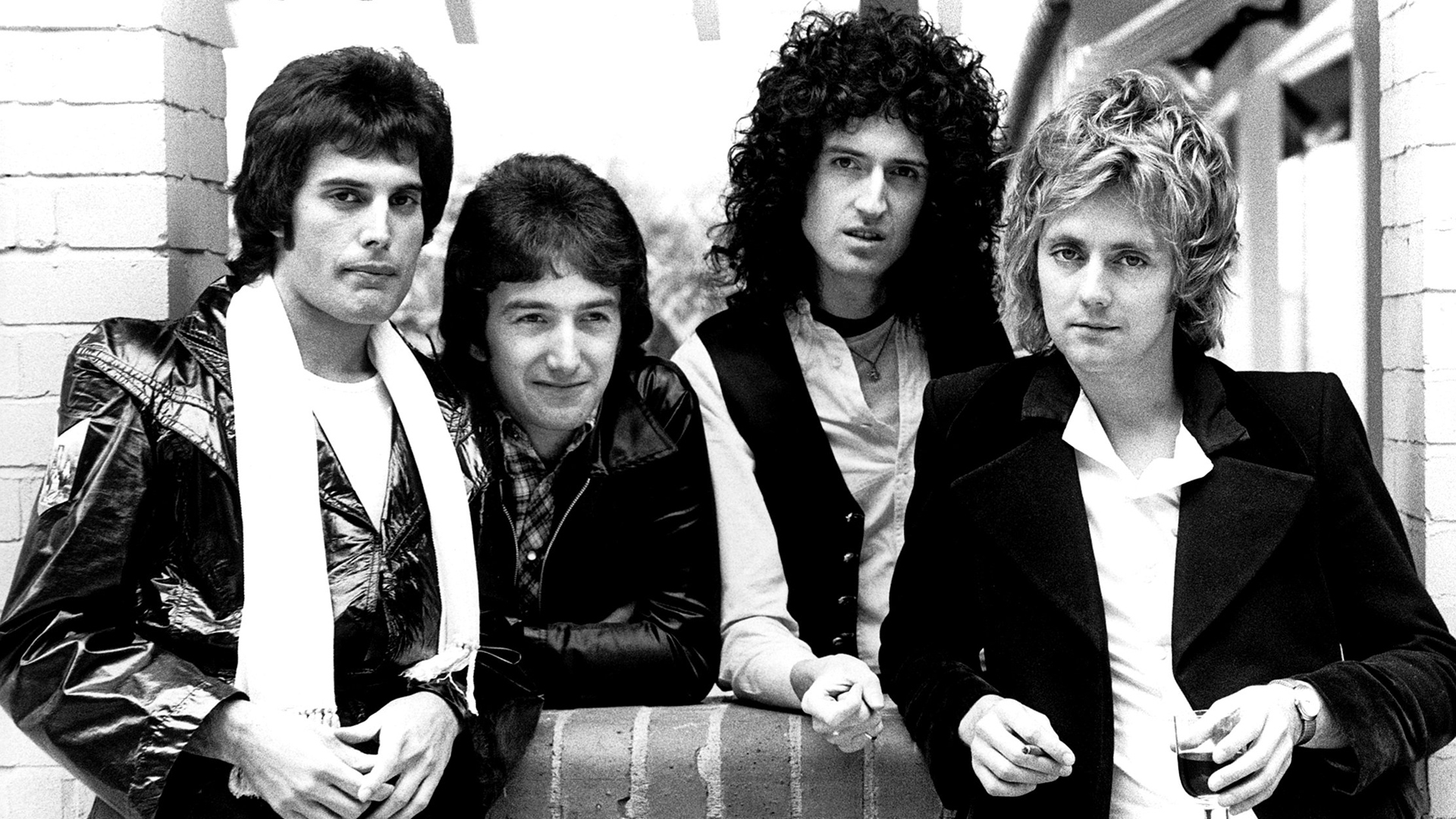
My Chemical Romance and the Used recorded a cover of the Queen (pictured in 1977) and David Bowie song, "Under Pressure", in 2005.

Released songs
Song	Writer(s)	Original release	Year	Ref(s).
"All I Want for Christmas Is You"	Walter Afanasieff / Mariah Carey ‡	Kevin & Bean's Christmastime in the 909	2004	
"All the Angels" (live demo)	Bob Bryar / Frank Iero / Ray Toro / Gerard Way / Mikey Way	The Black Parade/Living with Ghosts	2016	
"Ambulance" (Note: Stylized in all caps.) †	G. Way / Toro / Iero / M. Way / Bryar	Conventional Weapons (no. 2) (Note: Conventional Weapons consisted of five singles, containing two songs each, released from October 2012 to February 2013, named in numeric order of release (e.g. "Number One").)	2012	
"Astro Zombies"	Glenn Danzig ‡	Tony Hawk's American Wasteland	2005	
"Black Dragon Fighting Society"	Bryar / Iero / Toro / G. Way / M. Way	The Mad Gear and Missile Kid	2010	
"The Black Parade Is Dead" (Note: This song is primarily a spoken word or live banter recording.)	Bryar / Iero / Toro / G. Way / M. Way	The Black Parade Is Dead!	2008	
"Blood"	Bryar / Iero / Toro / G. Way / M. Way	The Black Parade	2006	
"Boy Division" †	G. Way / Toro / Iero / M. Way / Bryar	Conventional Weapons (no. 1)	2012	
"Bulletproof Heart" †	Bryar / Iero / Toro / G. Way / M. Way	Danger Days: The True Lives of the Fabulous Killjoys	2010	
"Burn Bright" †	G. Way / Toro / Iero / M. Way / Bryar	Conventional Weapons (no. 5)	2013	
"Bury Me in Black" (Note: Later released on Life on the Murder Scene (2006).)	Iero / Pelissier / Toro / G. Way / M. Way	B-side to "I'm Not Okay (I Promise)"	2004	
"Cancer"	Bryar / Iero / Toro / G. Way / M. Way	The Black Parade	2006	
"Cemetery Drive"	Iero / Matt Pelissier / Toro / G. Way / M. Way	Three Cheers for Sweet Revenge	2004	
"Common People" (Note: Performed and recorded for the BBC Radio 1 show on March 31, 2011.)	Nick Banks / Jarvis Cocker / Candida Doyle / Steve Mackey / Russell Senior ‡	"The Only Hope for Me Is You"	2011	
"Cubicles"	Pelissier / Toro / G. Way / M. Way	I Brought You My Bullets, You Brought Me Your Love	2002	
"Dead!"	Bryar / Iero / Toro / G. Way / M. Way	The Black Parade	2006	
"Demolition Lovers"	Pelissier / Toro / G. Way / M. Way	I Brought You My Bullets, You Brought Me Your Love	2002	
"Desert Song"	Iero / Pelissier / Toro / G. Way / M. Way	Life on the Murder Scene	2006	
"Desolation Row" †	Bob Dylan ‡	Watchmen: Music from the Motion Picture	2009	
"Destroya"	Iero / Toro / G. Way / M. Way	Danger Days: The True Lives of the Fabulous Killjoys	2010	
"Disenchanted"	Bryar / Iero / Toro / G. Way / M. Way	The Black Parade	2006	
"Drowning Lessons"	Pelissier / Toro / G. Way / M. Way	I Brought You My Bullets, You Brought Me Your Love	2002	
"Early Sunsets Over Monroeville"	Iero / Pelissier / Toro / G. Way / M. Way	I Brought You My Bullets, You Brought Me Your Love	2002	
"Emily"	Bryar / Iero / Toro / G. Way / M. Way	The Black Parade/Living with Ghosts	2016	
"The End."	Bryar / Iero / Toro / G. Way / M. Way	The Black Parade	2006	
"Every Snowflake Is Different (Just Like You)"	Iero / Toro / G. Way / M. Way	Yo Gabba Gabba! Hey!	2011	
"F.T.W.W.W."	Bryar / Iero / Toro / G. Way / M. Way	The Mad Gear and Missile Kid	2010	
"Fake Your Death" †	James Dewees / Iero / Toro / G. Way / M. Way	May Death Never Stop You	2014	
"Famous Last Words" †	Bryar / Iero / Toro / G. Way / M. Way	The Black Parade	2006	
"The Foundations of Decay" †	Iero / Toro / G. Way / M. Way	Non-album single	2022	
"The Ghost of You" †	Iero / Pelissier / Toro / G. Way / M. Way	Three Cheers for Sweet Revenge	2004	
"Give 'Em Hell, Kid"	Iero / Pelissier / Toro / G. Way / M. Way	Three Cheers for Sweet Revenge	2004	
"Goodnite, Dr. Death"	Iero / Toro / G. Way / M. Way	Danger Days: The True Lives of the Fabulous Killjoys	2010	
"Gun." †	G. Way / Toro / Iero / M. Way / Bryar	Conventional Weapons (no. 2)	2012	
"Hang 'Em High"	Iero / Pelissier / Toro / G. Way / M. Way	Three Cheers for Sweet Revenge	2004	
"Headfirst for Halos" †	Iero / Pelissier / Toro / G. Way / M. Way	I Brought You My Bullets, You Brought Me Your Love	2002	
"Heaven Help Us" (Note: Bonus track on the Japanese edition of The Black Parade (2006).)	Bryar / Iero / Toro / G. Way / M. Way	B-side to "Welcome to the Black Parade"	2006	
"Helena" †	Iero / Pelissier / Toro / G. Way / M. Way	Three Cheers for Sweet Revenge	2004	
"Honey, This Mirror Isn't Big Enough for the Two of Us" †	Iero / Pelissier / Toro / G. Way / M. Way	I Brought You My Bullets, You Brought Me Your Love	2002	
"House of Wolves"	Bryar / Iero / Toro / G. Way / M. Way	The Black Parade	2006	
"I Don't Love You" †	Bryar / Iero / Toro / G. Way / M. Way	The Black Parade	2006	
"I Never Told You What I Do for a Living"	Iero / Pelissier / Toro / G. Way / M. Way	Three Cheers for Sweet Revenge	2004	
"I'm Not Okay (I Promise)" †	Iero / Pelissier / Toro / G. Way / M. Way	Three Cheers for Sweet Revenge	2004	
"Interlude"	Iero / Pelissier / Toro / G. Way / M. Way	Three Cheers for Sweet Revenge	2004	
"It's Not a Fashion Statement, It's a Deathwish" (Note: Also known as "It's Not a Fashion Statement, It's a Fucking Deathwish".)	Iero / Pelissier / Toro / G. Way / M. Way	Three Cheers for Sweet Revenge	2004	
"Jack the Ripper" (Note: Later appeared as the B-side of "Thank You for the Venom" (2004).)	Martin Boorer / Steven Morrissey ‡	Like Phantoms, Forever	2002	
"Jet-Star and the Kobra Kid/Traffic Report"	Iero / Toro / G. Way / M. Way	Danger Days: The True Lives of the Fabulous Killjoys	2010	
"The Jetset Life Is Gonna Kill You"	Iero / Pelissier / Toro / G. Way / M. Way	Three Cheers for Sweet Revenge	2004	
"The Kids from Yesterday" †	Iero / Toro / G. Way / M. Way	Danger Days: The True Lives of the Fabulous Killjoys	2010	
"Kill All Your Friends"	Bryar / Iero / Toro / G. Way / M. Way	B-side to "Famous Last Words"	2006	
"Kiss the Ring" †	G. Way / Toro / Iero / M. Way / Bryar	Conventional Weapons (no. 4)	2013	
"The Light Behind Your Eyes" †	G. Way / Toro / Iero / M. Way / Bryar	Conventional Weapons (no. 3)	2012	
"Look Alive, Sunshine"	Iero / Toro / G. Way / M. Way	Danger Days: The True Lives of the Fabulous Killjoys	2010	
"Make Room!!!!" †	G. Way / Toro / Iero / M. Way / Bryar	Conventional Weapons (no. 4)	2013	
"Mama"	Bryar / Iero / Toro / G. Way / M. Way	The Black Parade	2006	
"Mastas of Ravenkroft"	Bryar / Iero / Toro / G. Way / M. Way	The Mad Gear and Missile Kid	2010	
"My Way Home Is Through You"	Bryar / Iero / Toro / G. Way / M. Way	B-side to "Famous Last Words"	2006	
"Na Na Na (Na Na Na Na Na Na Na Na Na)" †	Bryar / Iero / Toro / G. Way / M. Way	Danger Days: The True Lives of the Fabulous Killjoys	2010	
"Not That Kind of Girl" (live demo)	Bryar / Lee Hazlewood / Iero / Toro / G. Way / M. Way	The Black Parade/Living with Ghosts	2016	
"The Only Hope for Me Is You" †	Bryar / Iero / Toro / G. Way / M. Way	Danger Days: The True Lives of the Fabulous Killjoys	2010	
"Our Lady of Sorrows"	Pelissier / Toro / G. Way / M. Way	I Brought You My Bullets, You Brought Me Your Love	2002	
"Party at the End of the World" (live demo)	Bryar / Iero / Toro / G. Way / M. Way	The Black Parade/Living with Ghosts	2016	
"Party Poison"	Bryar / Iero / Toro / G. Way / M. Way	Danger Days: The True Lives of the Fabulous Killjoys	2010	
"Planetary (Go!)" †	Iero / Toro / G. Way / M. Way	Danger Days: The True Lives of the Fabulous Killjoys	2010	
"Romance"	— ‡ (Note: "Romance" is a guitar piece, which has no known author.)	I Brought You My Bullets, You Brought Me Your Love	2002	
"S/C/A/R/E/C/R/O/W"	Iero / Toro / G. Way / M. Way	Danger Days: The True Lives of the Fabulous Killjoys	2010	
"Save Yourself, I'll Hold Them Back"	Bryar / Iero / Toro / G. Way / M. Way	Danger Days: The True Lives of the Fabulous Killjoys	2010	
"The Sharpest Lives"	Bryar / Iero / Toro / G. Way / M. Way	The Black Parade	2006	
"Sing" †	Iero / Toro / G. Way / M. Way	Danger Days: The True Lives of the Fabulous Killjoys	2010	
"Skylines and Turnstiles"	Iero / Pelissier / Toro / G. Way / M. Way	I Brought You My Bullets, You Brought Me Your Love	2002	
"Sleep"	Bryar / Iero / Toro / G. Way / M. Way	The Black Parade	2006	
"Someone Out There Loves You" (Note: The song is labelled as "Untitled" on The Black Parade Is Dead!, but Gerard Way has clarified that "Someone Out There Loves You" was the official title. The song appears under this title on the 20th anniversary deluxe edition of The Black Parade. The song has also been erroneously referred to as "Stay".)	Bryar / Iero / Toro / G. Way / M. Way	The Black Parade Is Dead!	2008	
"Song 2"	Damon Albarn / Graham Coxon / Alex James / Dave Rowntree ‡	Radio 1's Live Lounge	2006	
"Summertime"	Iero / Toro / G. Way / M. Way	Danger Days: The True Lives of the Fabulous Killjoys	2010	
"Surrender the Night" †	G. Way / Toro / Iero / M. Way / Bryar	Conventional Weapons (no. 5)	2013	
"Teenagers" †	Bryar / Iero / Toro / G. Way / M. Way	The Black Parade	2006	
"Thank You for the Venom"	Iero / Pelissier / Toro / G. Way / M. Way	Three Cheers for Sweet Revenge	2004	
"This Is How I Disappear"	Bryar / Iero / Toro / G. Way / M. Way	The Black Parade	2006	
"This Is the Best Day Ever"	Pelissier / Toro / G. Way / M. Way	I Brought You My Bullets, You Brought Me Your Love	2002	
"To the End"	Iero / Pelissier / Toro / G. Way / M. Way	Three Cheers for Sweet Revenge	2004	
"Tomorrow's Money" †	Bryar / Iero / Toro / G. Way / M. Way	Conventional Weapons (no. 1)	2012	
"Under Pressure" (with the Used) †	David Bowie / John Deacon / Brian May / Freddie Mercury / Roger Taylor ‡	In Love and Death	2005	
"Vampire Money"	Iero / Toro / G. Way / M. Way	Danger Days: The True Lives of the Fabulous Killjoys	2010	
"Vampires Will Never Hurt You" †	Iero / Pelissier / Toro / G. Way / M. Way	I Brought You My Bullets, You Brought Me Your Love	2002	
"We Don't Need Another Song About California" (Note: Bonus track on the iTunes version of Danger Days: The True Lives of the Fabulous Killjoys (2010).)	Iero / Toro / G. Way / M. Way	Danger Days: The True Lives of the Fabulous Killjoys (deluxe)	2010	
"Welcome to the Black Parade" †	Bryar / Iero / Toro / G. Way / M. Way	The Black Parade	2006	
"The World Is Ugly" †	G. Way / Toro / Iero / M. Way / Bryar	Conventional Weapons (no. 3)	2012	
"You Know What They Do to Guys Like Us in Prison"	Iero / Pelissier / Toro / G. Way / M. Way	Three Cheers for Sweet Revenge	2004	
"Zero Percent"	Bryar / Iero / Toro / G. Way / M. Way	B-side to "Na Na Na (Na Na Na Na Na Na Na Na Na)"	2010	

== Unreleased songs ==
Unreleased songs
Song	Notes	Ref(s).
"Bike Thief"	Written for the band's scrapped fifth album, The Paper Kingdom, recorded in 2012. Leaked online in 2026.	
"Birthday Girl"	Written for the band's scrapped fifth album, The Paper Kingdom, recorded in 2012. Leaked online in 2026.	
"Dark Cloud"	Written for the band's scrapped fifth album, The Paper Kingdom, recorded in 2012. Leaked online in 2026.	
"Dive"	Written for the band's scrapped fifth album, The Paper Kingdom, recorded in 2012. Leaked online in 2026.	
"Dogs"	Written for the band's scrapped fifth album, The Paper Kingdom, recorded in 2012. Leaked online in 2026.	
"The Drugs"	Believed to have been written during the band's writing sessions for Conventional Weapons.	
"Falling Down"	Written for The Paper Kingdom. Leaked online in 2026.	
"First Chance"	Mentioned in an interview with Alternative Press as the second song recorded for Danger Days after "Na Na Na", but was left off of the album.	
"Herman Melville"	According to Iero, the band wrote a song while recording Three Cheers for Sweet Revenge about a mouse that lived in the walls of their recording studio, and called it "Herman Melville".	
"High Hopes"	Written for The Paper Kingdom. Leaked online in 2026.	
"Into Your Arms"	Reported on by Louder Sound to have been written for The Paper Kingdom, but is absent from the leaked workprint track list.	
"Louder"	Written for The Paper Kingdom. Leaked online in 2026.	
"Make It"	–	
"Narita Airport"	Written for The Paper Kingdom. Leaked online in 2026.	
"New Hair, Same Shit"	Mentioned by Gerard Way in an interview with MTV News in February 2009, during the writing sessions for Conventional Weapons.	
"Nine Volt Heart"	Included on the list of songs on My Chemical Romance's website in 2002. Nothing else is known of the song except the title.	
"Operation Day"	Written for The Paper Kingdom. Leaked online in 2026.	
"Paper Swords"	Written for The Paper Kingdom. Leaked online in 2026.	
"Perfectly Well"	Written for The Paper Kingdom. Leaked online in 2026.	
"Sister to Sleep"	According to Gerard Way, "Sister to Sleep" is conceptually about DC Comics character the Sandman, with lyrics about being unable to sleep, and that if one fell asleep, they would die. It was initially only performed once by the band in 2003. No studio version of the song was ever made available, with the only recording of it being a low-quality bootleg live recording. A 15-second snippet of the studio version was leaked onto social media in 2013. The band played it during their reunion tour in 2022, with adjusted lyrics including a new second verse.	
"Still Alive"	Believed to have been written during the band's writing sessions for Conventional Weapons.	
"Wake Up!"	Reported on by Louder Sound to have been written for The Paper Kingdom, leaked online in 2026.	
"War Beneath the Rain"	Written for The Paper Kingdom. The song was later performed during the band's Long Live The Black Parade tour in 2025. Leaked online in 2026.	
"Witch"	Written for The Paper Kingdom. Leaked online in 2026.	

== See also ==
- My Chemical Romance discography
