= The Kids from Yesterday =

2012 single by My Chemical Romance

Single by My Chemical Romance

from the album Danger Days: The True Lives of the Fabulous Killjoys
- Released: January 16, 2012
- Genre: Electropop; progressive pop; alternative rock
- Length: 5:24
- Label: Reprise
- Songwriters: Frank Iero; Ray Toro; Mikey Way; Gerard Way
- Producers: Rob Cavallo; My Chemical Romance

My Chemical Romance singles chronology
"The Only Hope for Me Is You" (2011)	"The Kids from Yesterday" (2012)	"Fake Your Death" (2014)

Music video
- "The Kids from Yesterday" on YouTube

"The Kids from Yesterday" is a song by the American rock band My Chemical Romance from their fourth studio album, Danger Days: The True Lives of the Fabulous Killjoys (2010). It was released as the final single from the album on January 16, 2012. Written by all members of the band and co-produced with Rob Cavallo, it is an electro-pop and alternative rock song about nostalgia and how all members of the band coped with growing up in their own ways.

Many critics have considered it the band's farewell song and generally given it positive reviews. The music video was directed by Emily Eisemann, a fan who previously created a collage featuring the band's live performances and their earlier interviews. When the band's vision for an official music video ended up being identical to Eisemann's edit, they collaborated to create the official clip. The song was later included on the band's greatest hits album, May Death Never Stop You (2014).

== Background and release ==
Following the success of their third studio album The Black Parade (2006), My Chemical Romance saw themselves primarily associated with that album and effectively the figureheads of emo music and culture at the time. Furthermore, the band became worried that they had started to lose their identity. As the production of their fourth album came to an end, frontman Gerard Way abruptly shelved it due to the band being unsatisfied with the final product. The band ultimately decided to restart production of the album, wanting to create an album that was the direct opposite of The Black Parade. Their vision was inspired by a comic story that Way had been working on about a group of characters known as the Killjoys, a series of outlaws who battled against a corrupt mega-corporation.

"The Kids from Yesterday" was the last song from the album to be recorded. The band wrote it as a song about nostalgia, and how each of the band members coped with growing up in their own way. They stated that idea of being a "kid from yesterday" was the band's way of "finding a new way to describe an adult". Furthermore, they stated that the song was their favorite on the record, and the "most special song for all of us". The song was written by all members of the band, who also co-produced the song with Rob Cavallo.

Danger Days: The True Lives of the Fabulous Killjoys was released as the band's fourth studio album on November 22, 2010, through Reprise Records; "The Kids from Yesterday" is the thirteenth song on the album's track list. The song was released as the final single from the album on January 16, 2012. It was released in the form of an extended play that features several additional tracks, including a remix of the song made by Dan P. Carter, two remixed versions of "Planetary (Go!)", and "Zero Percent". The song was later included on the band's greatest hits album, May Death Never Stop You, released on March 25, 2014. It is the final non-demo on the album's track list. The song has appeared on the set lists for the band's live performances, including during the album release party for Danger Days, their World Contamination Tour (2010–2012), their Reunion Tour (2019–2023), and the Long Live The Black Parade tour (2025–2026).

== Composition and lyrics ==
"The Kids from Yesterday" has been described as an electro-pop, progressive pop, and alternative rock song. It is 5 minutes and 24 seconds long. It makes use of synths that were described as Chloe Spinks of Gigwise as sounding like "solar flares", as well a bass line and a "meditative breakdown" in the words of Tris McCall of NJ.com; he compared the bass line to one from a song by New Order. Billboard described the song as having a "melancholy melody" and Spinks further said that it had a "gorgeous composition" with an "echoing arena sound". David Edwards of Drowned in Sound compared the song to those by the Killers and MGMT, while Evan Sawdey of PopMatters felt that it could have been a song written by Pulp.

The central theme of the song, as stated by the band, is nostalgia. However, it has also been interpreted as a farewell song for the band; "The Kids from Yesterday" was the final single that My Chemical Romance released before their break-up in March 2013. (Note: My Chemical Romance released a proper "final song", "Fake Your Death", in 2014 post-break up. The band later reunited in 2019 and has since released new music.) Lines in the song such as "This could be the last of all the rides we take / So hold on tight and don’t look back" and "You only live forever in the lights you make" have been highlighted by music journalists as particularly demonstrating the double meaning. The former line was interpreted by Andy Belt of PopMatters as possibly implying that the band knew that they would break up soon. Sam Law of Kerrang! described the song as "end credits finality".

== Critical reception ==
McCall highlighted "The Kids from Yesterday" as their "Song of the Day", describing it as the closest song to what they believed were the central themes of Danger Days: growing up, but not forgetting the lessons that one learned as in their youth. Law believed that, while the song initially came off as a regular alternative rock song, it featured a large amount of poignancy when viewed from the perspective as a eulogy on the band's history and legacy. He further labeled the song as an "invitation to consider how much we’d grown and how much this band had given". Likewise, Billboard described the song as encapsulating the "bittersweet feeling of saying farewell", while Spinks said that the song was like saying goodbye, receiving closure, and being satisfied with it. Sawdey and Edwards referred to "The Kids from Yesterday" as a "shimmering gem" and a "stunning pop nugget", respectively.

Belt deemed "The Kids from Yesterday" to be the best song in My Chemical Romance's discography, believing that it summarized "all of the band’s sentiments from their discography into one massive musical sendoff". Meanwhile, on a ranking of the band's twenty best songs, Law ranked it at tenth, while Billboard ranked it at fourteenth out of the fifteen; the latter stated that the song was "one final, bleary-eyed goodbye from the band to their unwavering fans". In their rankings of the band's whole discography, Spinks ranked the song as their twenty-seventh best, while Cassie Whitt and Jake Richardson of Loudwire ranked it thirty-first; Whitt and Richardson described it as a proper farewell to the band's "most colorful era", and a "fitting end to an album campaign that once more demonstrated the power of [the band]’s music".

== Music video ==
The music video for "The Kids from Yesterday" was directed by a fan, Emily Eisemann. Initially, Eisemann was responsible for creating a collage titled "My Chemical Romance – Celebrating 10 Years as a Band", which featured earlier interviews of the band interspersed with footage of their live performances; her video used "The Kids from Yesterday" as its background music. While the band was brainstorming what to do for their official music video for the song, they had a similar idea and began searching for footage to use for their collage. In the process, they stumbled across Eisemann's original video, whom they then contacted about using her video for the official clip. The final clip consists of the collage that the band put together themselves fused with Eisemann's own version; Eisemann's original video was credited and linked in the description, and she was labeled as the director of the video.

== Personnel ==
Taken from the digital liner notes.

Musicians

- Frank Iero — rhythm guitar, backing vocals, songwriter, producer
- Ray Toro — lead guitar, backing vocals, songwriter, producer
- Gerard Way — lead vocals, songwriter, producer
- Mikey Way — bass, songwriter, producer
- Jamie Muhoberac — keyboard
- John J. Miceli — drums, percussion

Technicians

- Rob Cavallo — producer
