= Sing (My Chemical Romance song) =

2010 single by My Chemical Romance

Single by My Chemical Romance

from the album Danger Days: The True Lives of the Fabulous Killjoys
- Released: November 3, 2010
- Genre: Pop; pop rock; emo
- Length: 4:30
- Label: Reprise
- Songwriters: Frank Iero; Ray Toro; Gerard Way; Mikey Way
- Producers: Rob Cavallo; My Chemical Romance

My Chemical Romance singles chronology
"Na Na Na (Na Na Na Na Na Na Na Na Na)" (2010)	"Sing" (2010)	"Planetary (Go!)" (2011)

Music video
- "Sing" on YouTube "Sing (Director's Cut)" on YouTube

"Sing" (stylized in all caps) is a song by the American rock band My Chemical Romance from their fourth studio album, Danger Days: The True Lives of the Fabulous Killjoys (2010). "Sing" is a pop, pop rock, and emo song, written after the band placed an emphasis on experimentation when writing new music. The track was written by Frank Iero, Ray Toro, Gerard Way, and Mikey Way, and was produced by the group alongside Rob Cavallo.

The track was originally published on the band's Myspace page on November 3, 2010, and was released on iTunes the following day. "Sing" was a commercial success, including in the United Kingdom where it topped the UK Rock & Metal Singles chart for four weeks and reached number 50 on the UK Singles chart. The song also charted in the United States, where it peaked at number 4 on the Hot Rock & Alternative Songs chart, number 10 on the Adult Pop Airplay chart, and number 58 on the Billboard Hot 100. The song was certified platinum in the United States by the Recording Industry Association of America (RIAA), gold in Canada by Music Canada, and silver in the United Kingdom by the British Phonographic Industry (BPI).

A music video for "Sing" was released on November 18, 2010; co-directed by Gerard Way and P. R. Brown, it is a sequel to the video for "Na Na Na (Na Na Na Na Na Na Na Na Na)" and features the band as the Killjoys, a group of rebels, who infiltrate a corporation's facilities to rescue a girl. Additionally, following the 2011 Tōhoku earthquake and tsunami, the band released a re-recorded version of the track, titled "#SINGItForJapan", as a charity single. "Sing" received mixed-to-negative reviews from music critics, who panned its pop sound as a departure from the band's prior rock sound. "Sing" was included on the setlist of the World Contamination Tour, the band's 2010–2012 concert tour in support of Danger Days.

== Background and composition ==
Following the success of their third studio album The Black Parade (2006), My Chemical Romance began sessions to record their fourth studio album; however, the band shelved the project due to being unsatisfied with the final result. Subsequently, My Chemical Romance reworked the album, taking advantage of the momentum they found after Gerard Way wrote "Na Na Na (Na Na Na Na Na Na Na Na Na)" and placing emphasis on experimentation when writing new songs. "Sing" was the fourth song recorded during this period, following "Na Na Na", "Vampire Money", and "Planetary (Go!)". According to Gerard Way, the song was built around a beat which the band "mediated on" for several days. He also noted how the song was the one from Danger Days that he was the most proud of, and marked the band's acceptance that they were creating a new album.

"Sing" is a mid-tempo pop, pop rock and emo song, which Megan Ritt of Consequence characterized as being "very open-genre, reminiscent of the late 90s radio rock that seemed like it would live forever". The song instrumentally contains drums, piano, and guitar in its first verse, before a "cavernous" bassline is introduced during the first chorus. Chris Mandle and John Doran stylistically compared the song to those by Whitesnake and Starship. Lyrically, both Jake Richardson of Alternative Press and Chad Childers of Loudwire identified "Sing" as a "call to arms", with the latter further writing how the track encourages listeners to "seize the day". Additionally, Al Shipley and Maura Johnston of Rolling Stone observed how the lyrics expressed a desire to both leave behind enemies and look towards the future with hope.

== Release ==
"Sing" was originally published on the band's Myspace page on November 3, 2010, before being released on iTunes the following day. On November 22, 2010, the song was released as the fourth track on Danger Days. The song was later released as a single in the United Kingdom on January 10, 2011 and impacted mainstream radio in the United States on January 11. Additionally, the song appeared on My Chemical Romance's greatest hits album, May Death Never Stop You (2014).

=== Live performances and other media ===
My Chemical Romance performed "Sing" during the World Contamination Tour, their 2010–2012 concert tour in support of Danger Days. The band also performed the song on Jimmy Kimmel Live! on November 19, 2010 and on Conan on January 17, 2011. The band would later perform the song on October 19, 2022, as part of their 2019–2023 reunion tour, and on July 19, 2025 as part of the Long Live The Black Parade tour.

"Sing" has also been included in television shows, including as a group performance number in The Sing-Off and The Voice, and in advertisements for American Idol. The song was also featured prominently in the Glee episode "Comeback", where a cover was performed as the final song of the episode. The Glee version of "Sing" received mixed reviews from critics: Erica Futterman of Rolling Stone praised the cover for its anthemic quality despite calling its beginning "awkward", while Brett Berk of Vanity Fair gave it one out of five stars and quipped that it was his "personal vote against a grunge comeback". Following its appearance on Glee, conservative commentator Glenn Beck called the song "propaganda" on his talk show due to its lyrical content, and described it as "an anthem saying 'Join us'". Gerard Way responded to the criticism on the band's website, writing how "the word Glenn Beck was looking for was 'subversion' not 'propaganda'". Way also commented that he allowed the show to use the song in order to "stir up [...] the fat cats in America", while Mikey Way expected that the song's usage would generate controversy. The cover debuted and peaked at number 49 on the Billboard Hot 100, and at number 37 on the Canadian Hot 100.

== Critical reception ==
"Sing" received mixed-to-negative reviews from music critics for its pop sound. Fraser McAlpine of the BBC gave the single a 3/5 star rating, criticizing it for straying from the band's rock sound and negatively comparing it to songs by "grown-up insider pop acts" like Maroon 5 and the Script. Evan Sawdey of PopMatters similarly critiqued the song as a "hackneyed, generic attempt" at a crossover track and for having an MOR sound, though conceded that it was a "passable mid-tempo rocker". Drowned in Sound's David Edwards praised the production of the song, but otherwise called it "confusing" and slammed the chorus for being clichéd. Xenophanes of SputnikMusic recognized that the band attempted a different sound on "Sing", yet called it "vapid", "dull", and "one of the worst songs on the album". However, Ben Hewitt of The Quietus praised the song's chorus for its anthemic quality.

Retrospective reviews of the track in rankings of My Chemical Romance's discography have similarly been polarized. Loudwire's Chad Childers placed it as the band's eighth best track, calling it a "euphoric rocker" and the best example of the band's "uplifting rock anthem[s]". Cassie Whitt and Richardson, also writing for Loudwire, ranked the song at number 50 (out of 71) in their ranking of all the band's songs, noting how it was atypical for the band. Similarly, Chloe Spinks of Gigwise placed the track low in her ranking at number 71 (of 79), commenting that the beginning of the song contained promise but was let down by a "hookless" chorus and "cheesy" lyricism. The song was nominated in the "Choice Music: Rock Track" category at the 2011 Teen Choice Awards.

== Commercial performance ==
"Sing" was a commercial success, with Rob Cavallo, the song's producer and the then-chairman at Warner Bros, calling it a "true, honest-to-God hit". In the United States, the song initially charted at No. 25 on the Bubbling Under Hot 100 chart on the week of December 11, 2010, and went on to peak at No. 58 on the Billboard Hot 100 in the week of March 5, 2011. "Sing" also reached No. 4 on the Hot Rock & Alternative Songs chart, No. 10 on the Adult Pop Airplay chart, and No. 24 on the Pop Airplay chart. On May 14, 2026, the Recording Industry Association of America (RIAA) certified it platinum.

Outside of the US, "Sing" topped the UK Rock & Metal Singles chart for four consecutive weeks and reached No. 50 on the UK Singles chart. The British Phonographic Industry (BPI) certified the track silver on June 9, 2024. In Canada, the song debuted and peaked at No. 57 on the Canadian Hot 100, and reached No. 33 on the Canada Rock chart and No. 48 on the Canada Hot AC chart. It was certified gold by Music Canada on January 16, 2026. Additionally, the track peaked at No. 17 on the Mexico Ingles Airplay chart, No. 43 in both Scotland and Australia, and No. 80 in Japan.

== Music video ==
In 2008, Gerard Way and Shaun Simon conceived the Killjoys, a group of rebels living in a post-apocalyptic world, as a comic book idea; this developed to become the concept behind Danger Days. The music video for "Sing" was conceived as a filmed adaptation of this concept, featuring the band as members of the Killjoys — Gerard as "Party Poison", Iero as "Fun Ghoul", Toro as "Jet Star", and Mikey Way as "Kobra Kid". The video was co-directed by Gerard and P. R. Brown; a one-minute trailer for the music video was released on November 3, 2010, before it debuted on MTV on November 18, 2010. A director's cut of the video was also later released on March 10, 2011.

The music video of "Sing" serves as a continuation of the plot established in the one for "Na Na Na". Set in Battery City, a post-apocalyptic town run by the megacorporation Better Living Industries, the video sees the band invading the company's facilities as they attempt to rescue Missile Kid (played by Grace Jeanette) from Korse (played by Grant Morrison) and his band of "Draculoids". Despite being significantly outnumbered, the Killjoys are ultimately able to save Missile Kid with the help of Dr. Death Defying (the narrator of Danger Days, played by Steve, Righ?); however, the Killjoys are killed in the process. Ali Shutler of Louder Sound wrote that the video represented themes like rebellion, perseverance, and optimism which the band has continuously stood for. In rankings of the band's music videos, Aliya Chaudhry of Kerrang! ranked it as the fifth-best for its "action-packed and futuristic" nature, while the staff of Alternative Press ranked it as the seventh-best and lauded its cinematography.

== 2011 charity version ==
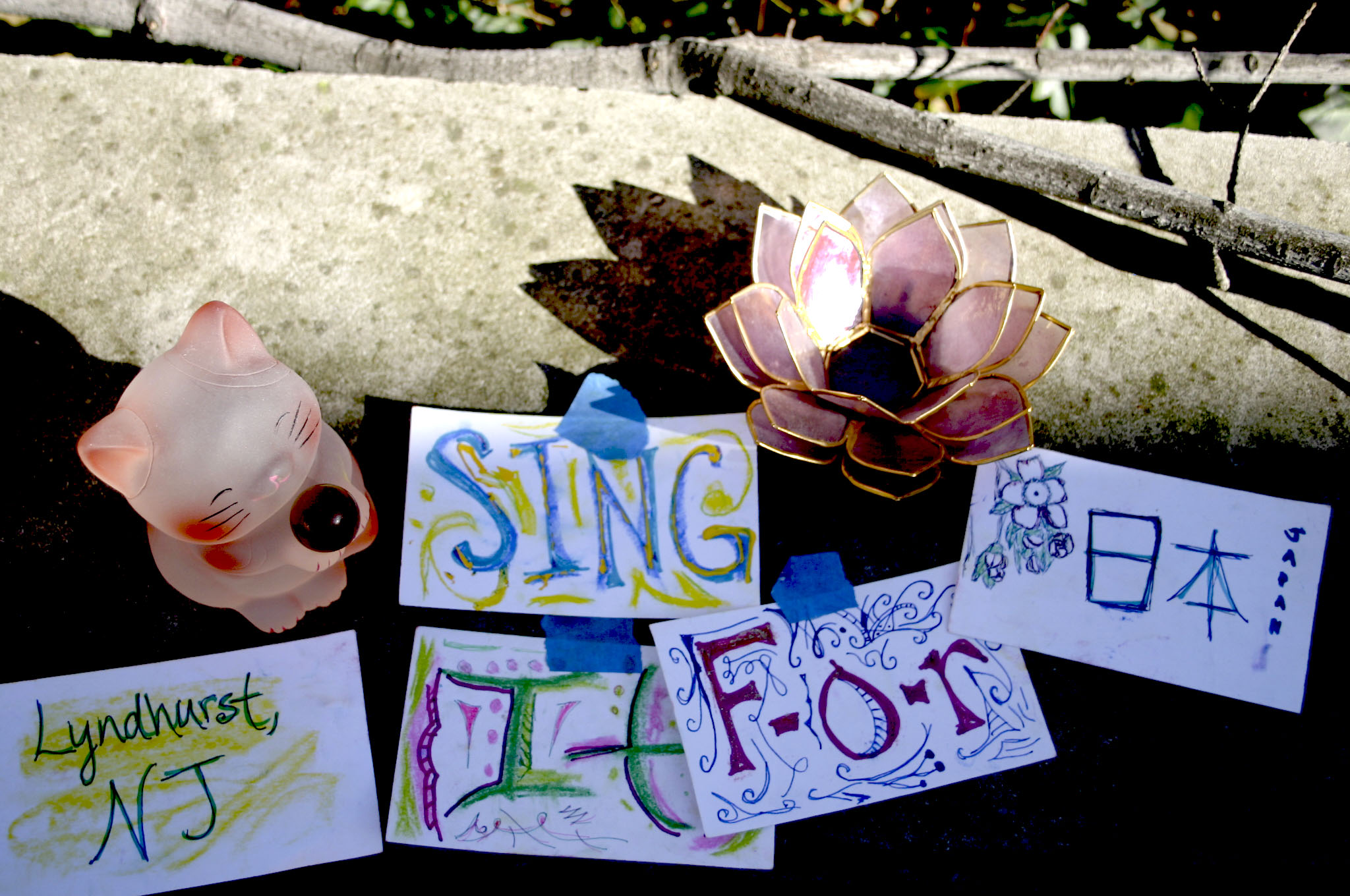
An example of a submission created for the #SINGItForJapan campaign, taken in Lyndhurst, New Jersey

In March 2011, an earthquake and tsunami struck Japan and devastated the country. Soon after the event, the hashtag "SINGItForJapan" began to spread on Twitter; this inspired the band as a whole, particularly Toro, to re-record "Sing" in order to release it as a charity single. The version, titled "#SINGItForJapan", features a full orchestra replacing the synths used on the original track; the band also noted how "classic Japanese themes" were incorporated into the orchestration as a form of tribute. The band also collected submissions from fans, who had taken pictures and recorded videos of themselves holding messages of support for those affect by the earthquake.

This culminated with the charity single's release on iTunes on April 14, 2011, accompanied by a music video; profits from the single and its accompanying t-shirt went to the Red Cross to support humanitarian efforts in the region. The video features footage of survivors in Japan, alongside the aforementioned fan contributions. It has ranked low on retrospective rankings of the band's music videos, but the artwork contributed by the band's fanbase received praise, and Aliya Chaudhry of Kerrang! called both the video and its show of solidarity with Japan "incredibly moving".

== Credits and personnel ==
Credits are adapted from Apple Music.

My Chemical Romance

- Gerard Way – lead vocals, songwriter, producer
- Raymond Toro – background vocals, lead guitar, songwriter, producer
- Frank Iero – background vocals, rhythm guitar, songwriter, producer
- Mikey Way – bass guitar, songwriter, producer

Additional performing artists

- Jamie Muhoberac – keyboards, sound design
- John Miceli – drums, percussion

Additional personnel

- Rob Cavallo – producer
- Chris Lord-Alge – mixing engineer
- Doug McKean – recording engineer
- Dan Chase – recording engineer, additional engineer
- Lars Fox – engineer
- Joe Libretti – drum technician
- Alan Bergman – guitar technician
- R.J. Ronquillo – guitar technician
- Todd Schofield – guitar technician
- Andrew Schubert – additional engineer
- Brad Townsend – additional engineer
- Steve Rea – assistant recording engineer
- Russ Waugh – assistant recording engineer
- Keith Armstrong – assistant mixing engineer
- Nik Karpen – assistant mixing engineer

Additional personnel on "#SINGItForJapan"

Credits are adapted from Apple Music. The personnel is substantially similar to that of the original track, with the following additions:

- Bob Bryar – drums, producer
- Suzie Katayama – orchestra conductor, orchestrator
- Bernie Grundman – mastering engineer
- Ted Jensen – mastering engineer
- Allen Sides – engineer

== Charts ==
=== Weekly charts ===
Weekly chart performance
Chart (2011)	Peak position
Australia (ARIA)	43
Canada Hot 100 (Billboard)	57
Canada Hot AC (Billboard)	48
Canada Rock (Billboard)	33
Japan Hot 100 (Billboard)	80
Mexico Ingles Airplay (Billboard)	17
Scottish Singles Sales (Official Charts)	43
UK Singles (Official Charts)	50
UK Rock & Metal (Official Charts)	1
US Billboard Hot 100	58
US Adult Pop Airplay (Billboard)	10
US Hot Rock & Alternative Songs (Billboard)	4
US Pop Airplay (Billboard)	24

=== Year-end charts ===
Year-end chart performance
Chart (2011)	Position
US Adult Top 40 (Billboard)	38
US Hot Rock Songs (Billboard)	28

== Certifications ==
Certifications
Region	Certification	Certified units/sales
Canada (Music Canada)	Gold	40,000^{‡}
United Kingdom (BPI)	Silver	200,000^{‡}
United States (RIAA)	Platinum	1,000,000^{‡}
^{‡} Sales+streaming figures based on certification alone.
