= The Only Hope for Me Is You =

2011 single by My Chemical Romance

Single by My Chemical Romance

from the album Danger Days: The True Lives of the Fabulous Killjoys
- Released: August 26, 2011
- Genre: Rock; pop-punk
- Length: 4:32
- Label: Reprise
- Songwriters: Bob Bryar; Frank Iero; Ray Toro; Gerard Way; Mikey Way
- Producers: Rob Cavallo; My Chemical Romance

My Chemical Romance singles chronology
"Bulletproof Heart" (2011)	"The Only Hope for Me Is You" (2011)	"The Kids from Yesterday" (2012)

"The Only Hope for Me Is You" is a song by the American rock band My Chemical Romance from their fourth studio album, Danger Days: The True Lives of the Fabulous Killjoys (2010). A rock and pop-punk song, it was originally conceived during the writing sessions for their fourth studio album, before the band abruptly shelved the project in favor of Danger Days. The song was written by Bob Bryar, Frank Iero, Ray Toro, Gerard Way, and Mikey Way, and was produced by the group alongside Rob Cavallo.

A four minute long power ballad, it was first released as a promotional single on October 12, 2010, before being released as the fourth commercial single from the album on August 26, 2011. It charted in a few countries, including the United States, where it reached number six on the Bubbling Under Hot 100 chart the week of October 30, 2010, and peaked at number 70 and 84 on both the Digital Song Sales chart and the Canadian Hot 100 chart. The song received mixed reviews from critics, with some calling it underwhelming, and others praising it for its use of keyboards. "The Only Hope for Me Is You" is featured on the soundtrack to the 2011 film Transformers: Dark of the Moon. It has occasionally been performed during the band's concert tours.

== Background and production ==
Following the critical and commercial success of their third studio album The Black Parade (2006), My Chemical Romance began to work on new material for their fourth studio album; however, they shelved the project after being unsatisfied with the result. Subsequently, the band started over, returning to the studio in Calabasas, California, with producer Rob Cavallo. They initially wanted to create an album that was the direct opposite of The Black Parade. The band took advantage of the momentum they found after Gerard Way wrote "Na Na Na (Na Na Na Na Na Na Na Na Na)", and emphasized experimentation when writing new songs. "The Only Hope for Me Is You" was among one of the four songs from the original recording sessions that made it onto the album, following "Bulletproof Heart", "Party Poison", and "Save Yourself, I'll Hold Them Back". The band experimented with the song multiple times, before settling on a version that was described by Way as "kind of split up the middle".

== Composition ==
"The Only Hope for Me Is You" is a power ballad that has been classified as a rock and pop-punk song. It is four minutes and thirty-two seconds long. Megan Ritt of Consequence described it as "offering the most classic MCR sound, but with a catchier, warmer overall sound than older tracks". Instrumentally, the song contains synthesizers, along with "chugging guitar riffs" and "arena-sized drums". An additional "whoosh" sound is present that Ben Hewitt of The Quietus described as the Death Star passing directly over your head. The song transitions into ripping guitars, paired with Way's high and desperate vocals.

== Release and commercial performance ==
Danger Days: The True Lives of the Fabulous Killjoys was released as the band's fourth studio album on November 22, 2010, through Reprise Records. "The Only Hope for Me Is You" is the sixth song on the album's track list, sequenced between "Planetary (Go!)" and "Jet-Star and the Kobra Kid/Traffic Report". It was first released as a promotional single on October 12, 2010, later being released as the album's fourth single on August 26, 2011. The digital-download version of the single features two additional tracks, including a remix of the track "The Kids from Yesterday" by Daniel P. Carter, and a cover of "Common People" by English rock band Pulp, recorded for Live Lounge on BBC Radio 1. A remastered version of "The Only Hope for Me Is You" appeared on the 2026 deluxe edition of Danger Days. Although not in the film, "The Only Hope for Me Is You" is featured on the soundtrack to the 2011 film Transformers: Dark of the Moon.

In the United States, the song reached number 6 on the Bubbling Under Hot 100 chart the week of October 30, 2010, and peaked at number 70 on the Digital Song Sales chart. Outside of the US, "The Only Hope for Me Is You" peaked at number 84 on the Canadian Hot 100 chart. The band performed the song live on various occasions, including during the album release party for Danger Days, the World Contamination Tour (2010-2012), T in the Park 2011, the 2011 Reading and Leeds Festivals, and on May 17, 2022, as part of their 2019–2023 reunion tour.

== Critical reception ==
"The Only Hope for Me Is You" received mixed reviews from critics. Chris Ryan of MTV praised the song, calling it "a soaring, mid-tempo track, covered in digital dust, with stabbing keyboards and a heart-wrenching chorus". Kevin O'Donnell of Spin drew comparisons between the song's sound and Radiohead. A review for Alternative Addiction praised it for how well it felt like a late‑1980s to early‑1990s pop-rock ballad. Adam Grundy, writing for chorus.fm, stated "The Only Hope for Me is You" was the closest the band got to The Black Parade in terms of musical style. In contrast, Evan Sawdey of PopMatters called it an "underwhelming tune". David Edwards of Drowned in Sound regarded the song as "an artificial stormcloud of faux-anthemics without any notable incident or alarm". IGN's Chris Carle noted "The Only Hope for Me Is You" as the weakest track on the album.

Nonetheless, Marianne Eloise of The Forty-Five placed "The Only Hope for Me Is You" at No. 37 (of 46) in her ranking of the band's discography, praising how well it seamlessly fit on the Transformers: Dark of the Moon soundtrack. Cassie Whitt and Jake Richardson, writing for Loudwire, placed it at No. 61 (of 71) in their ranking of the band's discography. Chloe Spinks of Gigwise placed it at No. 58 (of 79), claiming, "It creates a haunted aire, making it a perfect contributor to it's [sic] album".

== Credits and personnel ==
Credits are adapted from Apple Music.

My Chemical Romance

- Gerard Way – lead vocals, songwriter, producer
- Ray Toro – background vocals, lead guitar, songwriter, producer
- Frank Iero – background vocals, rhythm guitar, songwriter, producer
- Mikey Way – bass guitar, songwriter, producer

Additional performing artists

- Jamie Muhoberac – keyboards, sound design
- John Miceli – drums, percussion

Additional personnel

- Bob Bryar - songwriter, producer
- Rob Cavallo – producer
- Chris Lord-Alge – mixing engineer
- Doug McKean – recording engineer
- Dan Chase – recording engineer, additional engineer
- Joe Libretti – drum technician
- Alan Bergman – guitar technician
- R.J. Ronquillo – guitar technician
- Todd Schofield – guitar technician
- Andrew Schubert – additional engineer
- Brad Townsend – additional engineer
- Steve Rea – assistant recording engineer
- Russ Waugh – assistant recording engineer
- Keith Armstrong – assistant mixing engineer
- Nik Karpen – assistant mixing engineer

== Charts ==
Chart (2010)	Peak position
Canadian Hot 100 (Billboard)	84
US Bubbling Under Hot 100 (Billboard)	6
US Digital Song Sales (Billboard)	70
