= 10th Annual Honda Civic Tour =

2011 concert tour

- National tour by Blink-182 and My Chemical Romance
- Promotional poster for the tour
- Location: North America
- Start date: August 5, 2011
- End date: October 8, 2011
- Legs: 1
- No. of shows: 40
- Website: civictour.honda.com
Honda Civic Tour tour chronology
9th Annual Honda Civic Tour (2010)	10th Annual Honda Civic Tour (2011)	11th Annual Honda Civic Tour (2012)
Blink-182 tour chronology
Blink-182 in Concert (2009–10)	10th Annual Honda Civic Tour (2011)	20th Anniversary Tour (2011–14)
My Chemical Romance tour chronology
World Contamination Tour (2010–12)	10th Annual Honda Civic Tour (2011)	Reunion Tour (2019–23)

The 10th Annual Honda Civic Tour was a concert tour co-headlined by American rock bands Blink-182 and My Chemical Romance. Joined by supporting acts Matt & Kim, Manchester Orchestra, and Rancid, the tour began on August 5, 2011, and ran until October 8.

Sponsored by the Honda Motor Company, the 2011 tour marked the 10th anniversary of the concert tour, which Blink-182 headlined in its first incarnation.

== Background ==
The tour was announced on May 23, 2011. Both bands had gathered at the Rainbow Bar and Grill in West Hollywood to announce to the tour. Members of the official blink-182 and My Chemical Romance fan clubs had the first chance at tickets to all shows, in an exclusive pre-sale that began on June 6. On June 8, anyone who "liked" the Honda Civic Tour's Facebook page gained access to tickets. All remaining tickets went on sale to the general public on June 10 via Ticketmaster.com and LiveNation.com. The announcement of the tour angered European blink-182 fans, whose previously announced European tour was cancelled just one month before.

As was a tradition with the concert tour, blink-182 was chosen to customize a Honda Civic to commemorate their long collaboration with the tour. Singer-bassist Mark Hoppus, whose first car was a Honda Civic, stated Max Gramajo, who had previously been involved in album artwork and T-shirt designs, co-designed the vehicle. The car featured Koenig rims, Toyo tires, a matte-finish paint job and the blink-182 signature logo, the bunny rabbit (blink-182's mascot) and was handed away during the tour to a fan.

== Opening acts ==
- Manchester Orchestra (until August 23rd)
- Matt & Kim (from September 7th to October 8th)
- Rancid (Auburn, West Valley City, Greenwood Village)
- Alkaline Trio (Wantagh)
- Neon Trees (Des Moines)
- Jimmy Eat World (Tempe)
- H_{2}O (West Valley City)

== Set lists ==
My Chemical Romance
1. "Na Na Na (Na Na Na Na Na Na Na Na Na)"
2. "I'm Not Okay (I Promise)"
3. "Planetary (Go!)"
4. "Give 'Em Hell, Kid"
5. "The Only Hope for Me Is You"
6. "Mama"
7. "Our Lady Of Sorrows"
8. "Helena"
9. "Teenagers"
10. "Famous Last Words"
11. "S/C/A/R/E/C/R/O/W"
12. "Welcome to the Black Parade"
13. "Cancer"
Blink-182
1. "Feeling This"
2. "Up All Night"
3. "The Rock Show"
4. "What's My Age Again?"
5. "Down"
6. "I Miss You"
7. "Stay Together for the Kids"
8. "Dumpweed"
9. "Always"
10. "Violence"
11. "After Midnight"
12. "First Date" (contains elements of "Blow Job")
13. "Heart's All Gone"
14. "Man Overboard"
15. "Ghost on the Dancefloor"
16. "All the Small Things"
17. "Josie"

Encore

18. "Untitled I" (contains elements of "Can a Drummer Get Some?", "Beat Goes On", "Let's Go" and "Misfits") (Instrumental Interlude)
19. "Carousel"
20. "Dammit"

== Tour dates ==
List of 2011 concerts
Date	City	Country	Venue
August 5, 2011	Holmdel Township	United States	PNC Bank Arts Center
August 6, 2011	Wantagh	United States	Nikon at Jones Beach Theater
August 7, 2011	Wantagh	United States	Nikon at Jones Beach Theater
August 9, 2011	Mansfield	United States	Comcast Center
August 11, 2011	Corfu	United States	Darien Lake Performing Arts Center
August 12, 2011	Bristow	United States	Jiffy Lube Live
August 13, 2011	Hershey	United States	Hersheypark Stadium
August 14, 2011	Hartford	United States	Comcast Theatre
August 19, 2011	Maryland Heights	United States	Verizon Wireless Amphitheater
August 20, 2011	Tinley Park	United States	First Midwest Bank Amphitheatre
August 21, 2011	Cincinnati	United States	Riverbend Music Center
August 23, 2011	Milwaukee	United States	Marcus Amphitheater
September 1, 2011	Auburn	United States	White River Amphitheatre
September 3, 2011	West Valley City	United States	USANA Amphitheatre
September 4, 2011	Greenwood Village	United States	Comfort Dental Amphitheatre
September 7, 2011	Saint Paul	United States	Xcel Energy Center
September 8, 2011	Des Moines	United States	Wells Fargo Arena
September 9, 2011	Bonner Springs	United States	Capitol Federal Park
September 10, 2011	Noblesville	United States	Verizon Wireless Music Center
September 11, 2011	Clarkston	United States	DTE Energy Music Theatre
September 13, 2011	Cuyahoga Falls	United States	Blossom Music Center
September 15, 2011	Burgettstown	United States	First Niagara Pavilion
September 16, 2011	Saratoga Springs	United States	Saratoga Performing Arts Center
September 17, 2011	Camden	United States	Susquehanna Bank Center
September 18, 2011	Virginia Beach	United States	Farm Bureau Live
September 20, 2011	Charlotte	United States	Verizon Wireless Amphitheatre
September 21, 2011	Atlanta	United States	Aaron's Amphitheatre at Lakewood
September 23, 2011	West Palm Beach	United States	Cruzan Amphitheatre
September 24, 2011	Tampa	United States	1-800-ASK-GARY Amphitheatre
September 26, 2011	The Woodlands	United States	Cynthia Woods Mitchell Pavilion
September 27, 2011	Dallas	United States	Gexa Energy Pavilion
September 29, 2011	Albuquerque	United States	The Pavilion
September 30, 2011	Tempe	United States	Tempe Beach Park Amphitheatre
October 1, 2011	Anaheim	United States	Honda Center
October 2, 2011	Wheatland	United States	Sleep Train Amphitheatre
October 5, 2011	Mountain View	United States	Shoreline Amphitheatre
October 6, 2011	Chula Vista	United States	Cricket Wireless Amphitheatre
October 7, 2011	Summerlin	United States	Red Rock Amphitheatre
October 8, 2011	Hollywood	United States	Hollywood Bowl

=== Box office score data ===
Venue	City	Tickets sold / available	Gross revenue
Rogers Arena	Vancouver	5,037 / 7,488 (67%)	$281,278
Bell Centre	Montreal	9,908 / 11,888 (83%)	$627,137
DTE Energy Music Center	Clarkston	15,409 / 15,409 (100%)	$463,592
Hollywood Bowl	Hollywood	14,395 / 16,655 (86%)	$896,143

== Music video personnel ==
My Chemical Romance

- Frank Iero — rhythm guitar, backing vocals
- Ray Toro — lead guitar, backing vocals
- Gerard Way — lead vocals
- Mikey Way — bass

Additional musicians

- Michael Pedicone — drums (until September 1)
- Jarrod Alexander — drums (from September 3)
- James Dewees — Synth, keyboards and percussion
