= Vampire Money =

2010 song by My Chemical Romance

Song by My Chemical Romance

from the album Danger Days: The True Lives of the Fabulous Killjoys
- Released: November 22, 2010
- Genre: Punk rock
- Length: 3:38
- Label: Reprise
- Songwriters: Frank Iero; Ray Toro; Gerard Way; Mikey Way
- Producers: Rob Cavallo; My Chemical Romance

"Vampire Money" is a song by the American rock band My Chemical Romance from their fourth studio album, Danger Days: The True Lives of the Fabulous Killjoys (2010). Written by all four members of the band, and produced by them alongside Rob Cavallo, it is a punk rock song about the idea of musicians selling out. The song was primarily influenced by the band's experiences on being frequently asked to write a song for The Twilight Saga film soundtracks, which front man Gerard Way believed was a consequence of the aesthetic the band previously adopted being highly commercialized.

It was the second song that the band recorded for Danger Days and draws influence from several classic rock musicians, such as Chuck Berry and Jerry Lee Lewis, as well as earlier punk rock musicians. The lyrics make several jabs towards the Twilight Saga, as well as the music industry. "Vampire Money" has been well received by critics, with some considering it to be one of My Chemical Romance's best songs.

== Background and production ==
Following the success of their third studio album The Black Parade (2006), My Chemical Romance saw themselves primarily associated with that album and effectively the figureheads of emo music and culture at the time. Front man Gerard Way noted that the aesthetic that the band previous adopted had, at the time, become very popular and influenced media franchises such as The Twilight Saga. When the first Twilight film (2008) was in production, Way stated that the band was offered a lot of money to record a song for its soundtrack. They turned down the offer, with Way believing that the aesthetic was being capitalized on and was no longer special.

These beliefs influenced the direction of their next studio album, Danger Days: The True Lives of the Fabulous Killjoys (2010). They wanted the album to be the direct opposite of what The Black Parade was, ditching the gothic aesthetic entirely and creating songs from a wider range of genres. One of the songs on Danger Days, "Vampire Money", was written by the band as a protest against the Twilight Saga and people in the music industry who were "chasing that fucking money", in reference to Gerard Way's belief that their punk aesthetic was now being used as a marketing trend. The album, including "Vampire Money", was produced by Rob Cavallo alongside the rest of the band. Danger Days: The True Lives of the Fabulous Killjoys was released on November 22, 2010. "Vampire Money" is the final track on the album.

== Composition and lyrics ==
"Vampire Money" is a punk rock song that is three minutes and thirty-eight seconds long. Chloe Spinks of Gigwise described the track as having a "rock ‘n’ roll foundation". The track differs from the rest of Danger Days, which Billboard staff described as being often interpreted as a pop-driven record. In contrast, they described "Vampire Money" as a "raw punk" song with "blown-out guitars" and a "slick drum riff". The band described the song as being influenced by earlier rock musicians, namely Chuck Berry and Jerry Lee Lewis, as well as earlier punk rock musicians. Spin magazine compared the song's opening to that of "The Ballroom Blitz" by the Sweet, while the Recording Academy compared the song to ones made by the Rolling Stones and the Kinks.

The song is about the concept of a musician selling out. Gerard Way clarified that the song was also about anything that people don't want to be associated with despite being frequently asked to. The lyrics of the song make several jabs towards the Twilight Saga franchise. Among these references is one towards Volvo cars, which one of the characters in the Twilight Saga drives. The lyrics also reference several classic rock musicians, such as Marc Bolan and David Bowie. Jake Richardson of Kerrang! described the song as the band "[throwing] throw caution to the wind, offering an exuberant ‘fuck you’ to the industry as they triumphantly implode". Tatiana Tenreyro of Paste described "Vampire Money" as a diss track, while Ali Shutler of Louder interpreted it as a criticism towards mass media for "refusing to let artists grow".

== Critical reception ==
Spinks described "Vampire Money" as a love letter to classic rock acts, and said that the song was "loud and messy", while inspiring "yelling and dancing and truly letting go". Highlighting the songs introduction, she further described the song as the band welcoming the listener to a "party at the end of the world", with the listener being invited to participate in the joke. Cassie Whitt and Jake Richardson of Loudwire said that "Vampire Money" was a song which cleared up any doubt regarding My Chemical Romance's feelings about "rebellious culture" becoming mainstream. Spin wrote that, while humor was always My Chemical Romance's "greatest weapon", nothing they did was funnier than the jabs "Vampire Money" took towards those who recorded songs for Twilight Saga soundtracks.

In a more critical review of Danger Days, "Vampire Money" was one of only two tracks from the album that Jon Dolan of Entertainment Weekly highlighted alongside "Na Na Na (Na Na Na Na Na Na Na Na Na)". The song was also chosen as a highlight in album reviews from Edna Gundersen writing for USA Today, and Jonah Bayer of Alternative Press. In retrospective rankings of the band's discography, Billboard ranked it as the band's seventh-best song, Spinks ranked it at ninth, while Whitt and Richardson ranked it eleventh. Spin included it on their unranked list of My Chemical Romance's ten best songs.

== Personnel ==
Credits are adapted from Apple Music.

My Chemical Romance

- Gerard Way – lead vocals, songwriter, producer
- Mikey Way – bass guitar, backing vocals, songwriter, producer
- Raymond Toro – rhythm guitar, backing vocals, songwriter, producer
- Frank Iero – rhythm guitar, backing vocals, songwriter, producer

Additional performing artists

- Bob Bryar – drums, producer
- John Miceli – drums, percussion
- Jamie Muhoberac – keyboards, sound design

Additional personnel

- Dan Chase – recording engineer, additional engineer
- Nik Karpen – assistant mixing engineer
- Joe Libretti – drum technician
- Doug McKean – engineer
- Alan "Ace" Bergman – guitar technician
- R.J. Ronquillo – guitar technician
- Todd "Youth" Schofield – guitar technician
- Lars Fox – recording engineer
- Rob Cavallo – producer
