= Danger Days: The True Lives of the Fabulous Killjoys =

2010 album by My Chemical Romance

Studio album by My Chemical Romance
- Released: November 22, 2010
- Recorded: June 2009 – July 2010
- Studio: Calabasas, California
- Genres: Alternative rock; pop-punk; power pop; pop rock; glam rock; electronic rock
- Length: 54:05
- Label: Reprise
- Producers: Rob Cavallo; My Chemical Romance

My Chemical Romance chronology
The Black Parade Is Dead! (2008)	Danger Days: The True Lives of the Fabulous Killjoys (2010)	Conventional Weapons (2013)

Singles from Danger Days: The True Lives of the Fabulous Killjoys
- 1. "Na Na Na (Na Na Na Na Na Na Na Na Na)" Released: September 28, 2010; 2. "Sing" Released: November 3, 2010; 3. "Planetary (Go!)" Released: March 25, 2011; 4. "Bulletproof Heart" Released: June 13, 2011; 5. "The Only Hope for Me Is You" Released: August 26, 2011; 6. "The Kids from Yesterday" Released: January 16, 2012

Danger Days: The True Lives of the Fabulous Killjoys (often referred to as simply Danger Days) is the fourth studio album by the American rock band My Chemical Romance, released on November 22, 2010, by Reprise Records. It was produced by the band alongside Rob Cavallo and recorded in Calabasas, California. The primary musical inspiration for the album came from contemporary rock, psychedelic rock, and proto-punk bands of the sixties and seventies. It was the final album released by the band before their six-year disbandment from 2013 to 2019.

Like the band's previous album The Black Parade, Danger Days is a rock opera. The album's storyline takes place in post-apocalyptic California in 2019, where a group of rebellious outsiders known as Killjoys battle against an evil corporation. In 2013, frontman Gerard Way published a comic miniseries that continued the story described in the album.

To promote the album, the band embarked on a world tour, titled The World Contamination Tour. It lasted from October 2010 to February 2012, and included concerts in Europe, North America, Asia and Oceania; the band also co-headlined the 10th Annual Honda Civic Tour with Blink-182. Danger Days received generally positive reviews from critics and sold 112,000 copies in its first week, debuting at the top of the Billboard Rock Albums and Alternative Albums charts, and at number 8 on the Billboard 200. It also appeared in the music charts in several other countries. By February 2011, Danger Days had sold over a million copies worldwide. In May 2026, a deluxe edition reissue of the album was announced, featuring most of the original tracks remastered, and nine additional bonus tracks. It was released on July 10, 2026.

== Background ==
Following the grueling but highly successful tour for The Black Parade, My Chemical Romance entered the studio with producer Brendan O'Brien to produce the band's next album. The band, exhausted with the touring for The Black Parade and its dark tone, wanted to make a conscious break with the sound of that album, and take a more fun, stripped-down approach with "no concepts, no characters, no costumes, and no extra instrumentation". However, the band became unhappy with the final results of their recordings with O'Brien; while they felt as though they had achieved their goals, they also felt that they were holding themselves back creatively. As a result, My Chemical Romance decided to shelve the album in early 2010, a move that the band's label, Reprise Records, was supportive of. The sessions with Brendan O'Brien were eventually released in 2012 under the name Conventional Weapons.

After shelving the record, the band returned to the studio in Calabasas, California, with The Black Parade producer Rob Cavallo, who helped reinvigorate and guide the band back on track. Four songs from the band's shelved album, "Bulletproof Heart", "The Only Hope for Me Is You", "Save Yourself, I'll Hold Them Back" and "Party Poison" were brought back and re-recorded for the album. The track "Black Dragon Fighting Society" was re-recorded for the accompanying Mad Gear EP.

== Composition and lyrical themes ==
Danger Days is a rock opera. Its sound has been described as alternative rock, pop-punk, power pop, pop rock, glam rock, and electronic rock. The story is based around the fictional lives of the "Killjoys", a group of rebellious rogues living in a post-apocalyptic California in the year 2019. Occasionally narrated by pirate radio DJ Dr. Death Defying (voiced by Steve Montano), the album follows the group as they fight against the evil corporation Better Living Industries (BL/ind.) and its various "Draculoids" and exterminators, such as Korse (portrayed by Grant Morrison in music videos), from the S/C/A/R/E/C/R/O/W Unit.

In music videos and promotional material, the band members would portray their "Killjoy" alter-egos: "Party Poison" (Gerard Way), "Jet-Star" (Ray Toro), "Fun Ghoul" (Frank Iero), and "The Kobra Kid" (Mikey Way). The music video for "Na Na Na" shows the Killjoys' daily lives until Korse defeats them and captures "The Girl," while the video for "Sing" shows the Killjoys' rescue mission to get her back.

When asked about the album's title in a November 2010 interview, frontman Gerard Way said that "Danger Days is what it takes to do something great. It refers to us, to the fans, for all we know and artists who helped shape the album". Rolling Stone calls Danger Days a total rejection of the rock infladísimo celebrity. "Na Na Na" presents criticism of consumerist culture of the United States. The band described the main theme of "Sing" as "subversion, and to delve under the skin of certain individuals politically, socially, and also to reach national television to talk about how we feel about the world." Toro calls "S/C/A/R/E/C/R/O/W" a psychedelic song that "shows the artistic side of the band," and was heavily inspired by songs like "Lucy in the Sky with Diamonds" by the Beatles. The final track, "Vampire Money", was a reaction to the band being asked to do a song for The Twilight Saga. Gerard Way said that the reason behind the song's inclusion on the album was "there's a lot of people chasing that fucking money. 'Twilight?' A lot of people around us were like, 'Please, for the love of God, do this fucking movie.' But we'd moved on."

== Promotion ==
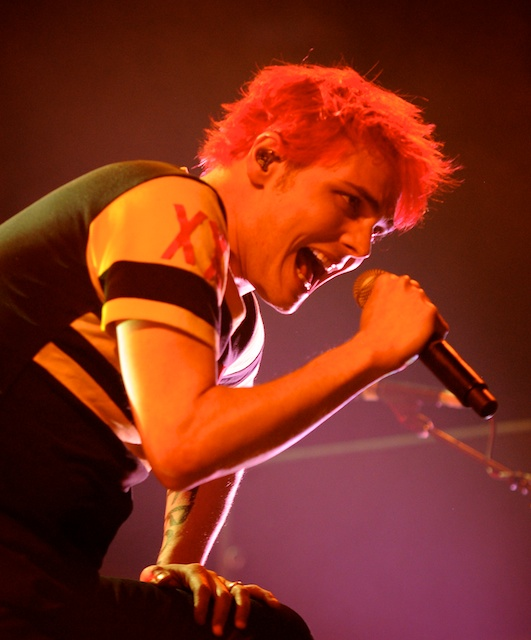
Gerard Way in Montreal, Canada, during the Honda Civic Tour, in August 2011

The band posted a teaser trailer for the album on September 17, 2010, via their official YouTube account, titled "Art Is the Weapon". On September 19, 2010, the band announced "The World Contamination Tour", taking place in parts of the UK, France, the Netherlands and Germany. This was followed by US radio dates in December before moving onto Japan, a full Europe tour, a US tour, European festivals and the Honda Civic Tour with Blink-182 in 2011.

The album's first single "Na Na Na (Na Na Na Na Na Na Na Na Na)" premiered on air September 22, 2010 via WRFF in Philadelphia, BBC Radio 1, and KROQ-FM in Los Angeles. The track is featured in the film Movie 43, and is also featured in the video game The Sims 3: Late Night, sung in the fictional language of Simlish. "The Only Hope for Me Is You" was released as a promotional single on October 11, and was also given as a free download to anyone who pre-ordered the album on the iTunes Store. "Sing" was covered on the Fox show Glee. "Planetary (Go!)" was featured in the video game Gran Turismo 5 and was also used in an advertisement for Super Bowl XLV. "The Kids From Yesterday" was premiered live on October 23, 2010. The songs "Na Na Na" and "Destroya" were also featured on the MTV show Teen Wolf.

"Save Yourself, I'll Hold Them Back" was released as a free download on the band's official website on 5 November 2010. The album premiered on November 16, 2010, on the band's official website, hosted by Dr. Death Defying.

For the deluxe edition of Danger Days, My Chemical Romance included the Mad Gear and Missile Kid extended play, labelled by the band as being part of the "Danger Days universe". The EP contains three tracks: "F.T.W.W.W.", "Mastas Of Ravenkroft" and "Black Dragon Fighting Society". The EP was released onto streaming services in 2022.

In May 2026, My Chemical Romance announced a deluxe edition reissue of Danger Days, later released on July 10, 2026, in honor of the album's fifteenth anniversary. The deluxe edition features remastered versions of most songs from the album, alongside nine additional bonus tracks. The bonus tracks include live performances of "Sing", "The Kids from Yesterday", and "Na Na Na (Na Na Na Na Na Na Na Na Na)", along with the Mad Gear and Missile Kid extended play. In addition, B-sides "Zero Percent", "We Don't Need Another Song About California", and a cover of "Common People" by Pulp, are also part of the tracklist. In the lead-up to the release, the live recording of "Na Na Na (Na Na Na Na Na Na Na Na Na)" for BBC Radio 1, along with remastered versions of "Save Yourself, I'll Hold Them Back", "Summertime", and "S/C/A/R/E/C/R/O/W" were published onto streaming services.

== Critical reception ==
Professional ratings
Aggregate scores
Source	Rating
AnyDecentMusic?	6.5/10
Metacritic	70/100
Review scores
Source	Rating
AllMusic	4.5/5 stars
Alternative Press	4/5 stars
The A.V. Club	D−
Entertainment Weekly	B−
The Guardian	4/5 stars
Los Angeles Times	2.5/4 stars
NME	8/10
Rolling Stone	3.5/5 stars
Spin	7/10
USA Today	3.5/4 stars

Upon its release, Danger Days: The True Lives of the Fabulous Killjoys received generally positive reviews. At Metacritic, which assigns a normalized rating out of 100 to reviews from mainstream critics, the album received an average score of 70, based on 26 reviews, which indicates "Generally favorable reviews".

Rock Sound received a preview of the album, commenting "the way they've used everything they learned on The Black Parade and tightened up in certain places feels natural and confident" and that it sees "the creativity of the band taking flight musically, graphically and literally." Dan Martin of NME got the chance to preview the album and had equally positive opinions. He stated that "[t]his is the best rock record of the year by such a margin that you actually feel rather embarrassed for everybody else." Alternative Press reviewed the album, and commented, "It's truly hard to believe this is the same act who exploded onto the scene six years ago with the emo anthem, "I'm Not Okay (I Promise)", as well as stating, "MCR have fully followed their own larger-than-life creative vision", with a rating of four stars. Matt Heafy, frontman and guitarist of the metal band Trivium, listed the album as the fourth best album of 2010. Stephen Thomas Erlewine of AllMusic awarded the album four and a half stars out of five and said the band were "Swapping gothic pomp for metallic power pop..." and that "There's no emo bloodletting...but for most listeners it's crystallized fun, the purest rush My Chemical Romance has ever delivered."

Rock Sound later reviewed the album, saying that "If MCR were your favourite band in the past it might feel like it's going to take some steady reappraisal before you ink their new logo on your rough book" and that "Danger Days simply sounds like they're having way more fun than ever." with a rating of eight stars out of ten. It was number 28 on Rolling Stone's list of the 30 Best Albums of 2010.

== Commercial performance ==
In the United States, Danger Days debuted and topped both the Top Rock Albums chart, and the Top Alternative Albums chart. Before peaking at No. 8 on the Billboard 200, The album additionally reached No. 3 on the Indie Store Album Sales chart. In 2026, the Recording Industry Association of America (RIAA) certified the album platinum for exceeding 1,000,000 units. In Canada, Danger Days peaked at No. 13 on the Canadian Albums chart, Music Canada certified the album gold in 2026. In addition, the album reached No. 10 on the Australian ARIA Albums chart.

In the United Kingdom, Danger Days peaked at No. 25 on the UK Rock & Metal Album charts, and reached No. 14 on the UK Albums chart. The British Phonographic Industry (BPI) certified the album platinum on July 17, 2026. Throughout the rest of Europe, Danger Days reached No. 11 in both Norway and Germany, No. 5 in Ireland, No. 4 in both Sweden and Austria, and No. 43 in Croatia. Additionally, Danger Days charted at No. 4 in New Zealand, Recorded Music NZ (RMNZ) certified the album gold. The album had sold over a million copies worldwide by February 2011.

== Comic series ==
In 2009, Way announced his intent to create a companion comic series titled The True Lives of the Fabulous Killjoys. He later announced at the 2012 New York Comic Con that he would co-write the series with Shaun Simon, the artwork would be done by Becky Cloonan, and that the first issue of the series would be released on June 6, 2013, with a preview of the book getting released on Free Comic Book Day. Way commented that the series would serve as the "last part of the story" and as a "coming to age story about a young girl".

== Track listing ==
All tracks are written by Frank Iero, Ray Toro, Gerard Way and Mikey Way, except where noted.

Standard edition
No.	Title	Writer(s)	Length
1.	"Look Alive, Sunshine" (featuring Steve Montano)		0:29
2.	"Na Na Na (Na Na Na Na Na Na Na Na Na)"	Bob Bryar; Iero; Toro; G. Way; M. Way	3:26
3.	"Bulletproof Heart"	Bryar; Iero; Toro; G. Way; M. Way	4:56
4.	"Sing (Note: Stylized in all caps.)"		4:30
5.	"Planetary (Go!)"		4:06
6.	"The Only Hope for Me Is You"	Bryar; Iero; Toro; G. Way; M. Way	4:32
7.	"Jet-Star and the Kobra Kid/Traffic Report" (featuring Steve Montano)		0:26
8.	"Party Poison"	Bryar; Iero; Toro; G. Way; M. Way	3:36
9.	"Save Yourself, I'll Hold Them Back"	Bryar; Iero; Toro; G. Way; M. Way	3:50
10.	"S/C/A/R/E/C/R/O/W"		4:28
11.	"Summertime"		4:06
12.	"Destroya (Note: Stylized in all caps.)"		4:32
13.	"The Kids from Yesterday"		5:25
14.	"Goodnite, Dr. Death" (featuring Steve Montano)		1:59
15.	"Vampire Money"		3:38
Total length:			54:05

- Tracks 1, 7 and 14 are omitted from the 15th anniversary deluxe edition.

15th anniversary deluxe edition bonus tracks
No.	Title	Writer(s)	Length
13.	"Zero Percent"	Bryar; Iero; Toro; G. Way; M. Way	2:46
14.	"We Don't Need Another Song About California"		4:27
15.	"F.T.W.W.W."		2:26
16.	"Mastas of Ravenkroft"		1:43
17.	"Black Dragon Fighting Society"		1:36
18.	"Common People" (recorded for BBC Radio 1)	Nick Banks; Jarvis Cocker; Candida Doyle; Steve Mackey; Russell Senior	5:35
19.	"Sing" (iTunes Festival '11)		4:20
20.	"The Kids from Yesterday" (iTunes Festival '11)		6:03
21.	"Na Na Na (Na Na Na Na Na Na Na Na Na)" (recorded for BBC Radio 1)		3:16
Total length:			83:19

== Personnel ==
Credits adapted from the album's liner notes.

My Chemical Romance

- Frank Iero – rhythm guitar, backing vocals, cover photograph for "Danger Days", production
- Ray Toro – lead guitar, backing vocals, production
- Gerard Way – lead and backing vocals, art direction, production
- Mikey Way – bass guitar, additional vocals (track 15), production

Additional

- Bob Bryar – songwriting (tracks 2, 3, 6, 8, 9 and "Zero Percent")
- Dorian Crozier – drums (track 3)
- Airi Isoda as NewsAGoGo – additional vocals (track 8)
- John Miceli – drums, percussion; gang vocals (track 9)
- Steven Montano (Steve, Righ?) as Dr. Death Defying – vocals (tracks 1, 2, 7, and 14, standard edition only)
- Jamie Muhoberac – keyboards, sound design
- Jonathan Rivera – gang vocals (track 9)

Production

- Rob Cavallo – production
- Doug McKean – sound engineering
- Dan Chase – additional sound engineering, additional Pro Tools
- Lars Fox – additional Pro Tools
- Russ Waugh – assistant sound engineer
- Steve Rea – assistant sound engineer
- Chris Lord-Alge – mixing
- Keith Armstrong – mixing assistant
- Nik Karpen – mixing assistant
- Brad Townsend – additional mixing
- Andrew Schubert – additional mixing
- Ted Jensen – mastering
- Neil Krug – photography
- Greg Watermann – additional photography
- Joe Libretti – drum technician
- Ace Bergman – guitar technician
- RJ Ronquillo – guitar technician
- Todd Youth – guitar technician
- Ellen Wakayama – art direction
- Matt Taylor – art direction, design

== Charts ==
=== Weekly charts ===
Chart (2010–2011)	Peak position
Australian Albums (ARIA)	10
Austrian Albums (Ö3 Austria)	15
Belgian Albums (Ultratop Flanders)	79
Belgian Alternative Albums (Ultratop Flanders)	18
Belgian Albums (Ultratop Wallonia)	99
Canadian Albums (Billboard)	13
Croatian International Albums (HDU)	15
Dutch Albums (Album Top 100)	60
Dutch Alternative Albums (Alternative Top 30)	3
European Albums (Billboard)	18
Finnish Albums (Suomen virallinen lista)	9
French Albums (SNEP)	80
German Albums (Offizielle Top 100)	18
Greek Albums (IFPI)	22
Irish Albums (IRMA)	14
Italian Albums (FIMI)	37
Japanese Albums (Oricon)	8
Mexican Albums (Top 100 Mexico)	9
New Zealand Albums (RMNZ)	4
Norwegian Albums (VG-lista)	21
Polish Albums (ZPAV)	46
Scottish Albums (Official Charts)	13
South Korean Albums (Gaon)	14
Spanish Albums (Promusicae)	31
Swedish Albums (Sverigetopplistan)	34
Swiss Albums (Schweizer Hitparade)	25
UK Albums (Official Charts)	14
UK Rock & Metal Albums (Official Charts)	25
US Billboard 200	8
US Indie Store Album Sales (Billboard)	3
US Top Alternative Albums (Billboard)	1
US Top Rock Albums (Billboard)	1

Chart (2026)	Peak position
Croatian International Albums (HDU)	10
German Rock & Metal Albums (Offizielle Top 100)	10
Hungarian Albums (MAHASZ)	35
Scottish Albums (Official Charts)	2
UK Albums (Official Charts)	2
UK Rock & Metal Albums (Official Charts)	1

=== Year-end charts ===
Chart (2010)	Position
UK Albums (OCC)	169

Chart (2011)	Position
UK Albums (OCC)	187
US Billboard 200	130
US Top Alternative Albums (Billboard)	16
US Top Rock Albums (Billboard)	19

== Certifications ==
Region	Certification	Certified units/sales
Canada (Music Canada)	Gold	40,000^{‡}
Ireland (IRMA)	Gold	7,500^{^}
New Zealand (RMNZ)	Gold	7,500^{^}
United Kingdom (BPI)	Platinum	300,000^{‡}
United States (RIAA)	Platinum	1,000,000^{‡}
^{^} Shipments figures based on certification alone.^{‡} Sales+streaming figures based on certification alone.

== Release history ==
Standard edition
Region	Date	Label	Format	Catalog
Australia	November 19, 2010	Reprise	CD	9362497189
Canada	November 22, 2010	Reprise	CD	2521752
Chile	December 2, 2010	Reprise	CD	5217522
Germany	November 19, 2010	Reprise	CD	9362497189
Ireland	November 19, 2010	Reprise	CD	9362497189
Japan	November 24, 2010	Reprise	CD	WPCR13948
Korea	November 23, 2010	Reprise	CD	WKPD0196
New Zealand	November 22, 2010	Reprise	CD	9362497189
Taiwan	November 23, 2010	Reprise	CD	9362497189
United Kingdom	November 22, 2010	Reprise	CD	9362497189
United States	November 22, 2010	Reprise	CD	5217522
United States	February 1, 2011	Reprise	Vinyl LP	5217521

Limited edition
Region	Date	Label	Format	Catalog
United States	November 22, 2010	Reprise	CD; box set	5259622
