= Planetary (Go!) =

2011 single by My Chemical Romance

Single by My Chemical Romance

from the album Danger Days: The True Lives of the Fabulous Killjoys
- Released: March 25, 2011
- Genre: Dance-punk; electropop; punk funk
- Length: 4:06
- Label: Reprise
- Songwriters: Frank Iero; Ray Toro; Gerard Way; Mikey Way
- Producers: Rob Cavallo; My Chemical Romance

My Chemical Romance singles chronology
"Sing" (2010)	"Planetary (Go!)" (2011)	"Bulletproof Heart" (2011)

Music video
- "Planetary (Go!)" on YouTube "Planetary (Go!)" (Outtake Version) on YouTube

"Planetary (Go!)" (stylized as "Planetary (GO!)") is a song by the American rock band My Chemical Romance from their fourth studio album, Danger Days: The True Lives of the Fabulous Killjoys (2010). A dance-punk, electropop, and punk funk song, "Planetary (Go!)" was conceived during the band's experimentation with synthesizers, as they had long wanted to write a dance-punk song. The track was written by band members Frank Iero, Ray Toro, Gerard Way, and Mikey Way, and was produced by the band alongside Rob Cavallo.

"Planetary (Go!)" was announced for release as a single on March 21, 2011, with a music video featuring a live performance of the song being released on that day; however, the single was ultimately released for digital download and streaming on the 25th. The track received divided reviews from music critics, with some regarding it as an album highlight while others criticized its sound and lyrics. "Planetary (Go!)" was notably included as the opening song of the 2010 video game Gran Turismo 5, and appeared on May Death Never Stop You, the band's 2014 greatest hits album. The song topped the UK Rock & Metal Singles Chart, and was nominated for Best Single at the Kerrang! Awards 2011.

== Background ==
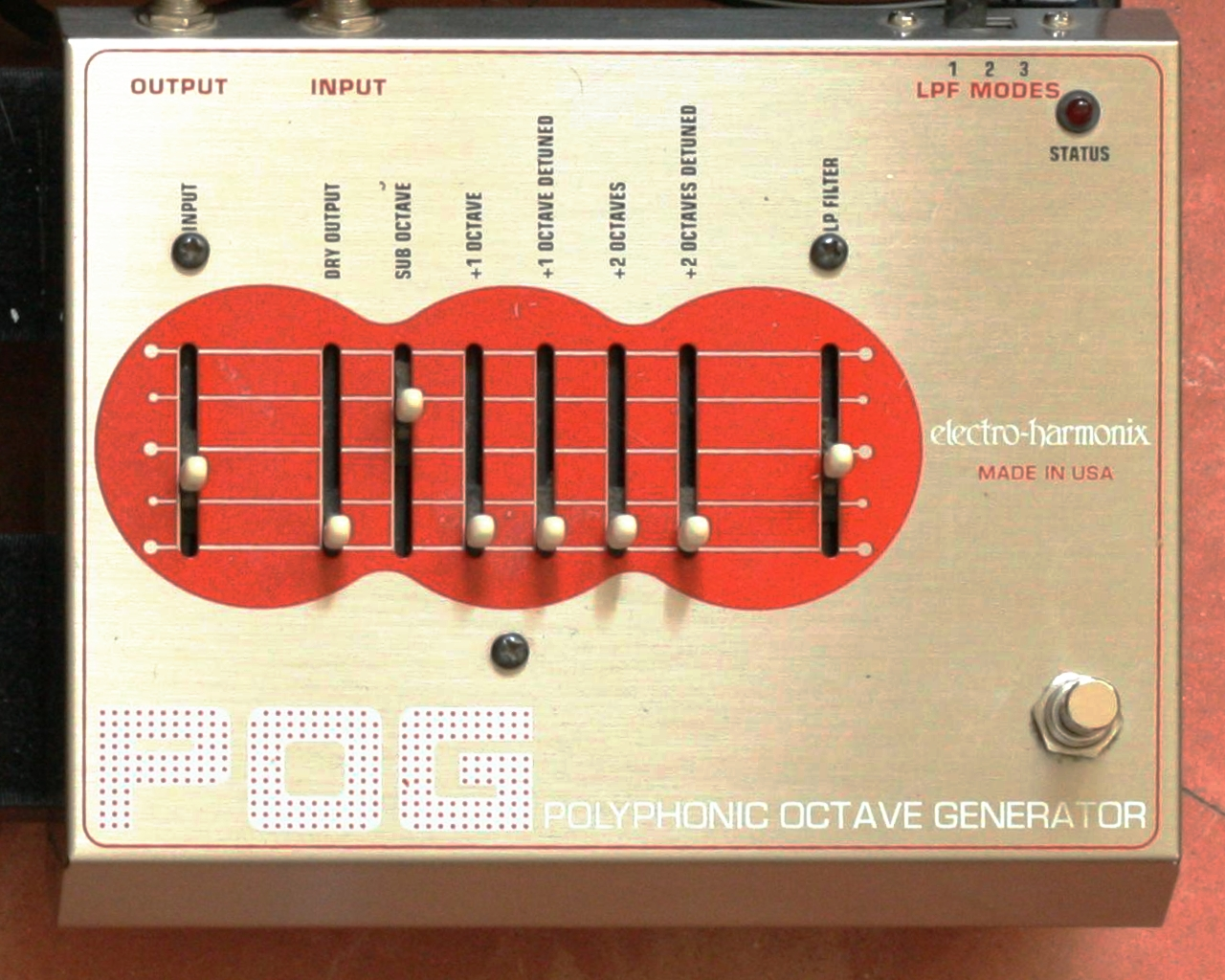
Ray Toro used an Electro-Harmonix POG pedal (example pictured) to make his guitar sound like a synthesizer for "Planetary (Go!)".

Following the success of their third studio album The Black Parade (2006), My Chemical Romance began sessions to record their fourth studio album; however, the band shelved the project after being unsatisfied with the final result. Subsequently, the band started again with an emphasis on experimentation and pushing boundaries when writing new songs. During this process, the entire band was trying out synthesizers, as they had long wanted to write a dance-punk song; My Chemical Romance biographer Tom Bryant wrote how the song "just popped out" when, according to Toro, Gerard Way "heard the hook" late at night. Toro also noted how the song, particularly its repetitive nature, was inspired by songs by the Rolling Stones like "Paint It Black". To make his guitar sound like a synthesizer on the track, Toro used an Electro-Harmonix POG pedal.

== Composition and lyrics ==
"Planetary (Go!)" is a dance-punk, electropop, and punk funk song which has been compared stylistically to pop rock and synth-pop; Jake Richardson of Kerrang! described it as a "joyous fusion of electronica and rock". Evan Sawdey of PopMatters additionally observed the stylistic influence of Britpop on the track, particularly noting similarities with the song "Girls & Boys" by Blur. Instrumentally, the track begins with a "screechy" synthesized introduction, before introducing "crunching" guitars, "towering" synthesizers, and a siren sound. John Doran of NME compared the synthesized arpeggios to those of Giorgio Moroder. Additionally, Kevin O'Donnell of Spin compared the track stylistically to those by Franz Ferdinand, while Jon Caramanica of The New York Times instead compared it to those by the Black Eyed Peas.

Lyrically, the song is a "call-to-arms", where Way chants lines like "Fame is now injectable" and "We just get up and go". Way later called the former line one of the favorite ones he wrote, noting how "it sums up how I feel". Ben Hewitt of The Quietus additionally interpreted the song as being a "beacon of hope", due to its "proclamations of immortality" through lines like "I can't slow down" and "I'm undefeatable".

== Release ==
A snippet of "Planetary (Go!)" was premiered on Spin on October 26, 2010. The song was later released on November 22, 2010, as the fifth track on the band's fourth studio album Danger Days: The True Lives of the Fabulous Killjoys. On February 4, 2011, the band announced on their website that the song would be released as a single on March 21, 2011; however, it was ultimately released for digital download and streaming on the 25th. The song was also released on May Death Never Stop You, the band's 2014 greatest hits album.

"Planetary (Go!)" was used as the opening song of Gran Turismo 5, with Toro noting his love of the series and saying that the track "makes you want to drive faster". The band also performed the song live on various occasions, including during the album release party for Danger Days, the World Contamination Tour, T in the Park 2011, the 10th Annual Honda Civic Tour, the 2011 Reading and Leeds Festivals, the 2022 When We Were Young festival, and the Long Live The Black Parade tour in 2025.

=== Music video ===
An accompanying "J-pop indebted" music video for "Planetary (Go!)" was released on March 21, 2011. The band announced on February 22, 2011 that the video would be filmed at the Islington Academy on the 24th, with tickets priced at £4. According to Penilla Holl, the general manager of the Islington Academy, promoters chose the venue for its "intimate" quality. Before filming began, the band played a short set to the 600 audience members in attendance. Once the band left the stage, props like masks and guns were given out. Afterwards, three or four takes of the audience members "rock[ing] out" were recorded, as the song played over the venue's sound system. Finally, the band returned to the stage to record several live takes of the track, with balloons and confetti being released onto the crowd. The final video had visual effects and "comic book-like text" overlaid atop the live footage, which according to Aliya Chaudhry of Kerrang! allowed it to maintain an energy typically lost in performance videos.

== Reception ==
"Planetary (Go!)" received mixed reviews from music critics. Both Sawdey and Megan Ritt of Consequence called the song a highlight on Danger Days, with the former calling it "one of the most lyrically biting tracks on the album". Additionally, David Edwards of Drowned in Sound regarded the song as a "firm kick-start" to the album, praising its energy. In contrast, a review for Alternative Addiction called the song "fine", but criticized how it followed mainstream trends and called it a low point on the album; a review for Alternative Press similarly called the song a dud. Channing Freeman of Sputnikmusic called the song "awful", writing that the track "desperately wants to be emotional [...] but it falls flat on its face". Nonetheless, Jessica Sager of Parade named "Planetary (Go!)" one of the 50 best songs of the 2010s, while Andy Belt of PopMatters ranked it the ninth-best song in My Chemical Romance's discography. Chloe Spinks of Gigwise placed the song at No. 28 (of 79) in her ranking of the band's entire discography, praising how it "feels like a party", while Cassie Whitt and Richardson, writing for Loudwire, placed it at No. 45 (of 71).

=== Accolades ===
Organization	Year	Category	Result	Ref.
Kerrang! Awards	2011	Best Single	Nominated	

== Personnel ==
Credits are adapted from Apple Music.

My Chemical Romance

- Gerard Way – lead vocals, songwriter, producer
- Raymond Toro – background vocals, lead guitar, songwriter, producer
- Frank Iero – background vocals, rhythm guitar, songwriter, producer
- Mikey Way – bass guitar, songwriter, producer

Additional performing artists

- Jamie Muhoberac – keyboards, sound design, graphic design
- John Miceli – drums, percussion

Additional personnel

- Rob Cavallo – producer
- Chris Lord-Alge – mixing engineer
- Keith Armstrong – mixing engineer
- Dan Chase – recording engineer, additional engineer
- Lars Fox – recording engineer
- Doug McKean – recording engineer
- Joe Libretti – drum technician
- Alan Bergman – guitar technician
- R.J. Ronquillo – guitar technician
- Todd Schofield – guitar technician
- Andrew Schubert – additional engineer
- Brad Townsend – additional engineer
- Steve Rea – assistant recording engineer
- Russ Waugh – assistant recording engineer
- Nik Karpen – assistant mixing engineer

== Charts ==
Chart performance for "Planetary (Go!)"
Chart (2011)	Peak position
Russia Airplay (TopHit)	187
UK Singles (OCC)	151
UK Rock & Metal (Official Charts)	1

== Release history ==
Region	Date	Format	Label(s)	Ref.
Various	March 25, 2011	Digital extended play (EP)	Reprise	
Various	June 20, 2011	Promotional CD single	Reprise; Warner	
