= Na Na Na (Na Na Na Na Na Na Na Na Na) =

2010 single by My Chemical Romance

Single by My Chemical Romance

from the album Danger Days: The True Lives of the Fabulous Killjoys
- B-side: "Zero Percent"
- Released: September 28, 2010
- Genre: Pop; pop-punk; punk rock; stadium rock; garage rock; glam rock
- Length: 3:23
- Label: Reprise
- Songwriters: Bob Bryar; Frank Iero; Ray Toro; Gerard Way; Mikey Way
- Producers: Rob Cavallo; My Chemical Romance

My Chemical Romance singles chronology
| "Desolation Row" (2009) | "Na Na Na (Na Na Na Na Na Na Na Na Na)" (2010) | "Sing" (2010) |

Music video
- "Na Na Na" on YouTube "Na Na Na (Lyric Video)" on YouTube

"Na Na Na (Na Na Na Na Na Na Na Na Na)" is a song by American rock band My Chemical Romance from their fourth studio album, Danger Days: The True Lives of the Fabulous Killjoys (2010). "Na Na Na" is a pop, pop-punk, punk rock, stadium rock, garage rock, and glam rock song conceived when Gerard Way was inspired to write music about a group of rebels he had previously created called the Killjoys. The song was written by Bob Bryar, Frank Iero, Ray Toro, Gerard Way, and Mikey Way, and was produced by the group alongside Rob Cavallo.

The track debuted on BBC Radio 1 on September 22, 2010, and was officially released as the album's lead single on September 28. "Na Na Na" has charted in multiple countries, including in the United Kingdom where it topped the UK Rock & Metal Singles Chart for four weeks and reached number 31 on the UK singles chart. The single also charted in the United States, where it reached number 77 on the Billboard Hot 100 and number 21 on the Hot Rock & Alternative Songs chart. "Na Na Na" has been certified platinum by Music Canada in Canada and gold by both the British Phonographic Industry (BPI) in the United Kingdom and Recorded Music NZ in New Zealand.

A science fiction-inspired music video for "Na Na Na" was released on October 14, 2010; co-directed by Gerard Way and Robert Schober, it features the band as the Killjoys as they try to protect a young girl in a post-apocalyptic world. The track received positive reviews from music critics, who called it catchy and deemed it a standout in My Chemical Romance's discography as a whole. "Na Na Na" was included on the setlist of the World Contamination Tour, the band's 2010–2012 concert tour in support of Danger Days, and has been played in multiple later live performances.

== Background and recording ==
Following the success of their third studio album The Black Parade (2006), My Chemical Romance began sessions to record their fourth studio album; however, the band shelved the project due to being unsatisfied with the final result. Later, while on a family vacation in a desert, Gerard Way was inspired to write music about the Killjoys, a group of rebels living in a post-apocalyptic world which he and Shaun Simon conceived in 2008 as a comic book idea. Way recorded an a cappella version of "Na Na Na" into his cell phone, the song having come to him "more or less whole", based on a guitar riff which the band had previously constructed but could not fully flesh out. Afterwards, the band met with Rob Cavallo, who had previously worked with the band on The Black Parade, and "Na Na Na" became the first song which the band recorded during these new studio sessions. According to Way, "Na Na Na" was the song which reinvigorated the band after they had previously fallen into an artistic stasis, noting how it "was the momentum we needed to dig deep and record another album".

== Composition and lyrics ==
"Na Na Na" is an anthemic pop, pop-punk, punk rock, stadium rock, garage rock, and glam rock. song featuring elements of art rock. The song smoothly transitions from the first track on Danger Days, "Look Alive, Sunshine", and begins with a "ferocious" guitar riff and a "nagging" opening refrain which subsides into a relatively calmer verse. Subsequently, the chorus of "Na Na Na" features a vocal line consisting of "Na"'s which echoes the guitar riff; Jack Roger of Rock Sound counted that the track contained 261 "Na"'s in total. The song also contains a spoken word breakdown and a guitar solo, which begins similarly to its main hook before a second, harmonized guitar line is added. Both Chris Ryan of MTV News and the staff of Louder Sound compared the guitar riff to those by the Stooges, while Gregory Adams of Exclaim! compared the guitar licks in the song's breakdown to those of Yngwie Malmsteen and Alternative Press called the song "Bowie-inflected". Talia Soghomonian of NME compared its sound to the band's previous song "I'm Not Okay (I Promise)".

Jake Richardson of Kerrang! observed themes of control, consumerism, and violence in the lyrics of "Na Na Na", while Fraser McAlpine of the BBC interpreted its first verse as being about a nihilistic gang member. Bobby Makar of Alternative Press also observed how the song's lyrics build the world of Danger Days, particularly through its references to pop-culture figures such as John F. Kennedy and Batman. Gerard Way noted that the lyrics of "Na Na Na" were "probably the most direct lyrics [he'd] ever written", and has compared it to the theme song of a Saturday-morning cartoon. Iero noted that "Na Na Na" exemplifies the album's themes of "rebelling against the rules people have for cleaning up for the greater good".

== Release ==
A snippet of "Na Na Na" was first heard in "Art is the Weapon", a two-minute trailer for Danger Days released on September 17, 2010. The song later debuted in full on Zane Lowe's BBC Radio 1 show on September 22, 2010. According to Craig Aaronson, the band's A&R man, the strong response from the radio debut influenced the record label to officially release "Na Na Na" as the album's lead single. The band made a formal announcement of the single's release on their website the next day, and it was released on September 28, 2010 alongside a lyric video for the track. The song was also released to alternative radio in the United States on the same day. Later releases include a single release in the United Kingdom on November 13, 2010 and a limited 7-inch vinyl release for Record Store Day on April 16, 2011, with the song "Zero Percent" issued as its B-side. The song was also included in the band's greatest hits album, May Death Never Stop You (2014).

=== Live performances and other media ===
"Na Na Na" was first played live during the World Contamination Tour, the 2010–2012 concert tour in support of Danger Days. The band also performed the song during a pre-game performance at Wembley Stadium on October 31, 2010 (alongside "Welcome to the Black Parade"), and on Jimmy Kimmel Live! on November 18, 2010 (alongside "Sing"). My Chemical Romance later played "Na Na Na" as part of their performances at the 10th Annual Honda Civic Tour, T in the Park 2011, the 2011 Reading and Leeds Festivals, their 2019–2023 reunion tour, the 2022 Riot Fest, the 2022 When We Were Young festival, and the Long Live The Black Parade tour in 2025. Additionally, "Na Na Na" has been included in the video games The Sims 3 (with vocals re-recorded in the fictional language Simlish) and Guitar Hero Live. The song also featured in a trailer for the 2013 comedy film Movie 43.

== Critical reception ==
"Na Na Na" received generally positive reviews from music critics upon its initial release as a single. Fraser McAlpine of the BBC gave the single five out of five stars, citing its appeal as a pop song and its high energy, while the staff of Billboard gave the single four out of five stars for its "immediacy" and its anthemic chorus. Gregory Adams of Exclaim! described the song as "obnoxious", but conceded that it worked well. Various critics noted the band's departure from their sound on The Black Parade, (Note: Attributed to Talia Soghomonian and Dan Martin of NME, Billboard's Jason Lipshutz, and MTV News's Chris Ryan.) with Dan Martin of NME praising how the single shied away from that album's "conceptual dreamscapes pretending to have cancer", and was instead "rooted in the here and now".

Upon the release of Danger Days, "Na Na Na" was met with further acclaim, with critics widely regarding the song as catchy. (Note: Attributed to IGN's Chris Carle, Consequence's Megan Ritt, MusicOMH's Max Raymond, Boston.com's Marc Hirsh, and Xenophanes and Channing Freeman of Sputnikmusic.) Alternative Addiction called the song a highlight on the album, and Max Raymond of MusicOMH regarded it as one of the album's high points. Ben Hewitt of The Quietus lauded the song for being "big, dumb, and full of fun", while Rolling Stone's Melissa Maerz commented that it was hard to hate. Megan Ritt of Consequence wrote how the track was stylistically distinct from My Chemical Romance's previous releases, but praised its bigger sound, the quicker and more technical guitar, and Way's vocals. Both IGN's Chris Carle and Xenophanes of Sputnikmusic felt that "Na Na Na" was a good choice for a single, owing to its poppy, record-defining sound; yet, Channing Freeman, also of Sputnikmusic, called it an initially "disconcerting" pick for the lead single, despite its catchiness. In a more critical review of the album, Jason Heller of The A.V. Club called the song "embarrassing" due to its "hammering, yammering idiocy".

"Na Na Na" has also appeared in several rankings of the band's discography as a whole. Both Andy Belt of PopMatters and Chloe Spinks of Gigwise ranked the song as the band's fourth-best, with the latter praising the level of control in the track despite its chaotic sound. Loudwire's Chad Childers ranked the track as their fifth-best, commending its energy and sing-along nature, while Cassie Whitt and Jake Richardson, also of Loudwire, and Tom Bryant, writing for Louder, all placed it at number 7 on their respective rankings. Louder's Marianne Eloise ranked "Na Na Na" at number 9, calling the song "stadium-ready", and the staff of Spin included it in their list of the band's 10 best songs. Sam Law of Kerrang! placed the track at number 11 on his ranking of the band's 20 best songs, praising its chorus and lauding how it managed to effectively signal the band's new stylistic direction. Additionally, Sam Roche of Guitar World chose "Na Na Na" as one of the band's six best guitar moments, highlighting the catchiness of both its main hook and guitar solo.

== Commercial performance ==
In the United States, "Na Na Na" debuted and peaked at number 77 on the Billboard Hot 100, and reached number 21 on the Hot Rock & Alternative Songs chart. In Canada, the single reached number 70 on the Canadian Hot 100 and number 37 on the Canada Rock chart, being certified platinum by Music Canada. The song also reached number 10 on the Mexico Ingles Airplay chart.

In the United Kingdom, the song debuted atop the UK Rock & Metal Singles Chart and remained at the peak position for four weeks; the song also reached number 31 on the UK Singles chart. The British Phonographic Industry certified "Na Na Na" gold in 2024, signifying sales of 400,000 units. The track also charted in several other European charts: Scotland (26), Sweden (44), Austria (71), the Netherland (86), and Germany (94). Additionally, "Na Na Na" reached number 9 on the Japan Hot 100 chart and number 33 in New Zealand, being certified gold in the latter country by Recorded Music NZ.

== Music video ==
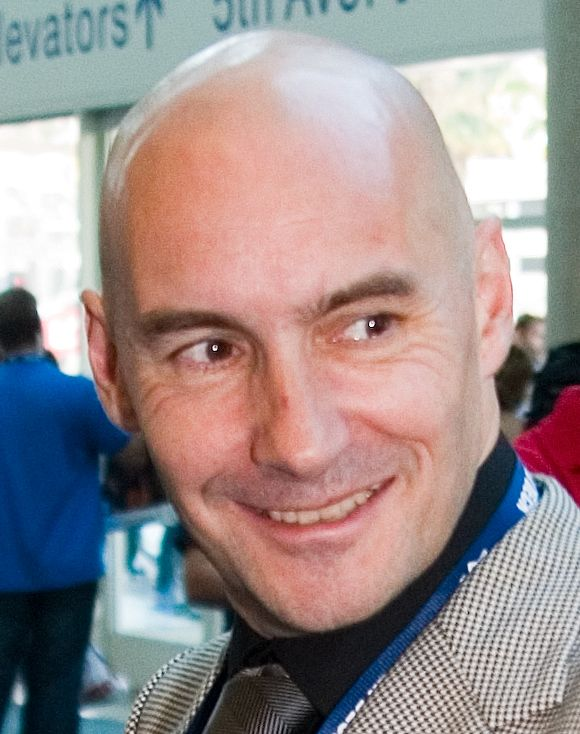
Grant Morrison (pictured in 2008) played Korse, the antagonist of the music video for "Na Na Na".

The music video for "Na Na Na" was conceived as a filmed adaptation of the comic book concept Way and Simon had previously created, featuring the band as members of the Killjoys — Gerard Way as "Party Poison", Iero as "Fun Ghoul", Toro as "Jet Star", and Mikey Way as "Kobra Kid". According to Toro, the video was created after the enthusiastic audience response to "Art is the Weapon", with the band opting to expand it into a full video. Co-directed by Way and Robert Schober, known as Roboschobo, the video is framed as a short-form trailer; Way noted that he decided against doing a longer-form video for "Na Na Na" because he felt that it already contained everything he wanted in it. The music video was filmed over the course of two days, with Grant Morrison noting how the car chases filmed on the first day took so long that the second day of filming required a lot of improvisation. The video debuted on MTV on October 14, 2010.

The music video takes place in the year 2019 in Battery City, a post-apocalyptic town run by the megacorporation Better Living Industries. In the video, the Killjoys are protecting a young girl named Missile Kid (played by Grace Jeanette) from Korse (played by Morrison) and his band of "Draculoids". The Killjoys are able to successfully fend off most of the Draculoids, however they are defeated in a final standoff against Korse. He kidnaps Missile Kid but spares the life of the Killjoys, warning them to "keep running". The video also contains an easter egg where a half-buried skeleton is dressed in a military jacket from The Black Parade; Bryant interpreted it as a manifestation of the band's desire to "kill off" their persona from that era. Way has named science fiction movies from the late 1970s and early 1980s, particularly Blade Runner and Mad Max, and pop art as direct influences on the video. Critics have also stylistically compared it to Faster, Pussycat! Kill! Kill!, Terminator 2: Judgment Day and works by Quentin Tarantino.

The music video for "Na Na Na" has been generally well-received by critics, with Carle noting that the video, like the track, defined Danger Days as a whole. Aliya Chaudhry of Kerrang! ranked it as the band's third-best music video, praising its worldbuilding and noting how it could have been expanded into a full movie. The staff of Alternative Press placed the video at number 4 in their ranking, similarly writing that the video is "crying out to be made into a feature-length film" and lauding its ambition. Meredith Woerner of Gizmodo included the video in her list of the ten greatest apocalyptic and post-apocalyptic music videos. The music video was also awarded Best Video at the 2011 editions of both the Kerrang! Awards and the NME Awards.

== Credits and personnel ==
Credits are adapted from Apple Music.

My Chemical Romance

- Gerard Way – lead vocals, songwriter, producer
- Raymond Toro – background vocals, lead guitar, songwriter, producer
- Frank Iero – background vocals, rhythm guitar, songwriter, producer
- Mikey Way – bass guitar, songwriter, producer

Additional performing artists

- Jamie Muhoberac – keyboards, sound design
- John Miceli – drums, percussion

Additional personnel

- Bob Bryar – songwriter, producer
- Rob Cavallo – producer
- Chris Lord-Alge – mixing engineer
- Doug McKean – recording engineer
- Ted Jensen – mastering engineer
- Lars Fox – engineer
- Joe Libretti – drum technician
- Alan Bergman – guitar technician
- R.J. Ronquillo – guitar technician
- Todd Youth – guitar technician
- Dan Chase – additional engineer
- Andrew Schubert – additional engineer
- Brad Townsend – additional engineer
- Steve Rea – assistant engineer
- Russ Waugh – assistant engineer
- Keith Armstrong – assistant mixing engineer
- Nik Karpen – assistant mixing engineer

== Charts ==
Chart performance for "Na Na Na (Na Na Na Na Na Na Na Na Na)"
| Chart (2010) | Peak position |
|---|---|
| Austria (Ö3 Austria Top 40) | 71 |
| Canada Hot 100 (Billboard) | 70 |
| Canada Rock (Billboard) | 37 |
| Germany (GfK) | 94 |
| Japan (Japan Hot 100) (Billboard) | 9 |
| Mexico Ingles Airplay (Billboard) | 10 |
| Netherlands (Single Top 100) | 86 |
| New Zealand (Recorded Music NZ) | 33 |
| Scottish Singles Sales (Official Charts) | 26 |
| Sweden (Sverigetopplistan) | 44 |
| UK Singles (Official Charts) | 31 |
| UK Airplay (Music Week) | 35 |
| UK Rock & Metal (Official Charts) | 1 |
| US Billboard Hot 100 | 77 |
| US Hot Rock & Alternative Songs (Billboard) | 21 |

== Certifications ==
| Region | Certification | Certified units/sales |
|---|---|---|
| Canada (Music Canada) | Platinum | 80,000^{‡} |
| New Zealand (RMNZ) | Gold | 15,000^{‡} |
| United Kingdom (BPI) | Gold | 400,000^{‡} |
| United States (RIAA) | Platinum | 1,000,000^{‡} |
^{‡} Sales+streaming figures based on certification alone.
