= The World Contamination Tour =

2010–12 concert tour by My Chemical Romance

- Tour by My Chemical Romance
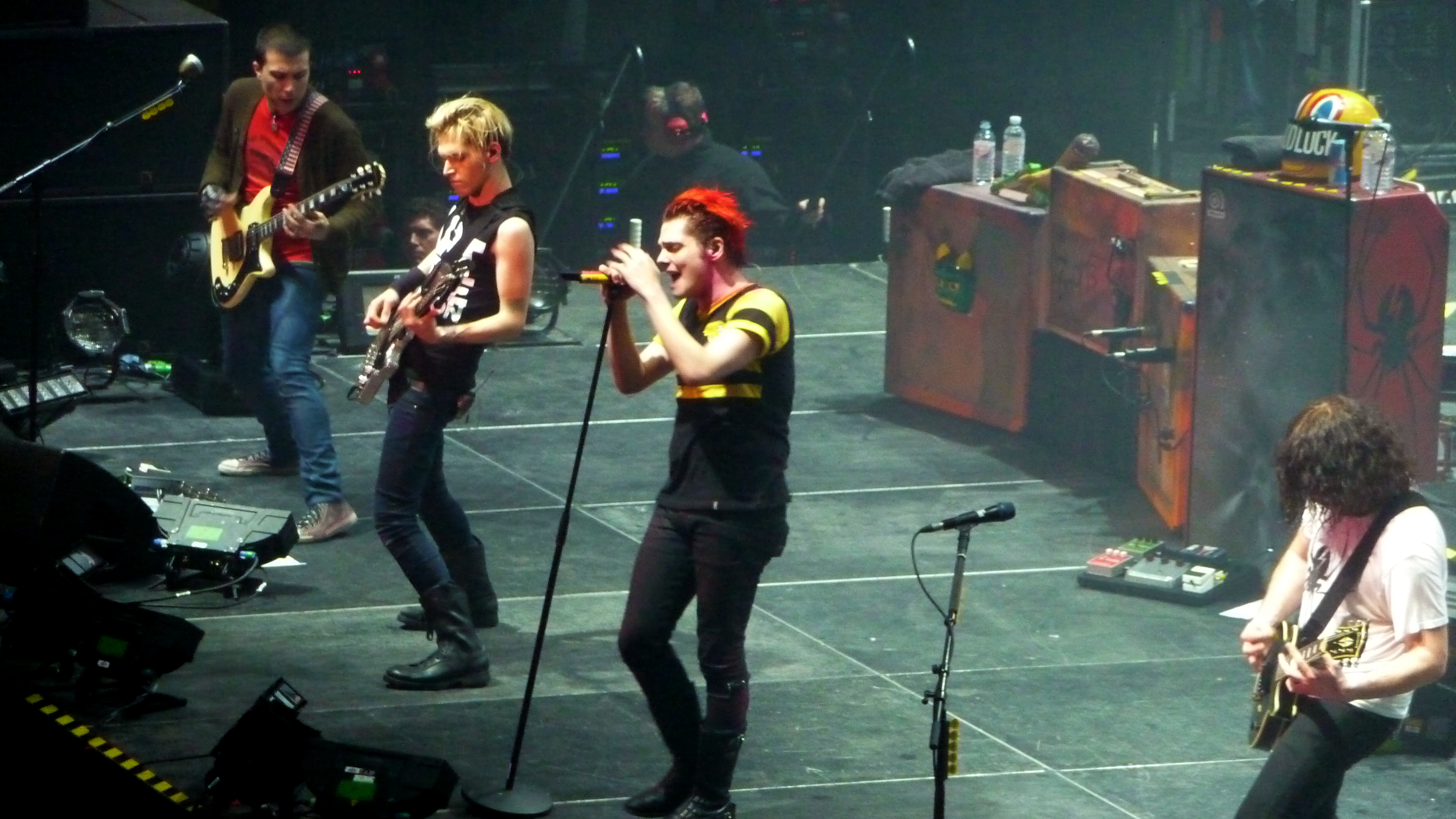
- Left to right: Frank Iero, Mikey Way, Gerard Way, and Ray Toro at the Nottingham Capital FM Arena in February 2011
- Location: Asia; Europe; North America; Oceania
- Associated album: Danger Days: The True Lives of the Fabulous Killjoys
- Start date: October 23, 2010
- End date: May 12, 2012
- Legs: 7
- No. of shows: 102

My Chemical Romance concert chronology
- The Black Parade World Tour (2007–2008); The World Contamination Tour (2010–2012); Honda Civic Tour 2011 (2011)

The World Contamination Tour was a concert tour supporting My Chemical Romance's fourth album Danger Days: The True Lives of the Fabulous Killjoys (2010). This was the first tour My Chemical Romance had done since the departure of their drummer Bob Bryar. For the tour, Michael Pedicone was the stand-in drummer.

== Support acts ==
- Twin Atlantic (Europe—Leg 1) (select dates)
- Lostalone (Europe—Leg 2)
- The Blackout (Europe—Leg 2) (select dates)
- Architects (North America—Leg 2)
- Bring Me the Horizon (North America—Leg 2) (select dates)
- Anti-Flag (North America—Leg 2) (Toronto and Montreal)
- Thursday (North America—Leg 2) (select dates)
- Circa Survive (North America—Leg 2) (select dates)

== Setlist ==
The band's setlist contained mostly songs from Danger Days, but also from their other three albums. There was not a steady setlist the band used, although the song "Na Na Na (Na Na Na Na Na Na Na Na Na)" was used as the intro to all shows.

== Tour dates ==
List of 2010 concerts
Date	City	Country	Venue
October 23, 2010	London	England	Hammersmith Apollo
October 24, 2010	Manchester	England	O2 Apollo
October 25, 2010	Edinburgh	Scotland	Edinburgh Corn Exchange
October 30, 2010	Amsterdam	Netherlands	Melkweg
November 1, 2010	Paris	France	Cigale
November 3, 2010	Berlin	Germany	Kesselhaus
November 4, 2010	Hamburg	Germany	Gruenspan
November 5, 2010	Dortmund	Germany	Freizeit Zentrum West
December 3, 2010	New York City	United States	Roseland Ballroom ^{[A]}
December 5, 2010	Tampa	United States	1-800-ASK-GARY Amphitheatre ^{[B]}
December 8, 2010	Kansas City	United States	Midland Theatre ^{[C]}
December 10, 2010	San Jose	United States	HP Pavilion at San Jose ^{[D]}
December 11, 2010	Los Angeles	United States	Gibson Amphitheatre ^{[E]}
December 12, 2010	San Diego	United States	Viejas Arena ^{[E]}
December 14, 2010	St. Louis	United States	The Pageant ^{[F]}
December 15, 2010	Chicago	United States	House of Blues ^{[G]}
December 18, 2010	Toronto	Canada	Sound Academy ^{[H]}

List of 2011 concerts
Date	City	Country	Venue
January 31, 2011	Osaka	Japan	Zepp Osaka
February 2, 2011	Nagoya	Japan	Zepp Nagoya
February 5, 2011	Yokohama	Japan	Yokohama Arena
February 6, 2011	Yokohama	Japan	Yokohama Arena
February 12, 2011	London	England	Wembley Arena
February 13, 2011	Birmingham	England	LG Arena
February 15, 2011	Glasgow	Scotland	SECC
February 16, 2011	Dublin	Ireland	The O2
February 18, 2011	Manchester	England	MEN Arena
February 19, 2011	Nottingham	England	Capital FM Arena
February 21, 2011	Cardiff	Wales	Cardiff International Arena
February 22, 2011	Newcastle	England	Metro Radio Arena
February 26, 2011	Tilburg	Netherlands	Popcentrum 013
February 27, 2011	Cologne	Germany	Palladium
March 1, 2011	Paris	France	Le Casino de Paris
March 3, 2011	Toulouse	France	Le Bikini
March 5, 2011	Barcelona	Spain	Palau Sant Jordi
March 7, 2011	Milan	Italy	PalaSharp
March 8, 2011	Zürich	Switzerland	Komplex 457
March 9, 2011	Munich	Germany	Kesselhaus
March 12, 2011	Valencia	Spain	City of Arts and Sciences
March 14, 2011	Hamburg	Germany	Große Freiheit
March 15, 2011	Copenhagen	Denmark	K.B. Hallen
March 16, 2011	Oslo	Norway	Oslo Spektrum
March 18, 2011	Stockholm	Sweden	Annexet
March 20, 2011	Helsinki	Finland	Hartwall Arena
March 31, 2011	Oakland	United States	Fox Oakland Theatre
April 1, 2011	Portland	United States	Roseland Theatre
April 2, 2011	Vancouver	Canada	Center for Performing Arts
April 3, 2011	Seattle	United States	Showbox SoDo
April 5, 2011	Edmonton	Canada	Edmonton Event Centre
April 6, 2011	Calgary	Canada	MacEwan Hall
April 8, 2011	Salt Lake City	United States	In the Venue
April 9, 2011	Denver	United States	Fillmore Auditorium
April 10, 2011	Des Moines	United States	Val Air Ballroom
April 12, 2011	Minneapolis	United States	First Avenue
April 13, 2011	Milwaukee	United States	Eagles Ballroom
April 15, 2011	Chicago	United States	Aragon Ballroom
April 16, 2011	Grand Rapids	United States	The Orbit Room
April 17, 2011	Cleveland	United States	House of Blues
April 19, 2011	Toronto	Canada	Kool Haus
April 20, 2011	Montreal	Canada	Métropolis
April 22, 2011	New York City	United States	Terminal 5
April 23, 2011	New York City	United States	Terminal 5
May 5, 2011	Boston	United States	House of Blues
May 6, 2011	Upper Darby Township	United States	Tower Theatre
May 7, 2011	Sayreville	United States	Starland Ballroom
May 8, 2011	Sayreville	United States	Starland Ballroom
May 10, 2011	Washington, D.C.	United States	9:30 Club
May 11, 2011	Atlanta	United States	The Tabernacle
May 15, 2011	Carlisle	England	Carlisle Airport ^{[I]}
May 17, 2011	Fort Lauderdale	United States	Revolution
May 18, 2011	Orlando	United States	House of Blues
May 20, 2011	Houston	United States	House of Blues
May 21, 2011	Dallas	United States	House of Blues
May 22, 2011	Dallas	United States	House of Blues
May 25, 2011	Bakersfield	United States	Majestic Fox Theater
May 27, 2011	Los Angeles	United States	Hollywood Palladium
May 28, 2011	Los Angeles	United States	Hollywood Palladium
May 29, 2011	Las Vegas	United States	House of Blues
June 17, 2011	Warsaw	Poland	Pepsi Arena ^{[J]}
June 18, 2011	Scheeßel	Germany	Eichenring ^{[K]}
June 19, 2011	Neuhausen ob Eck	Germany	Neuhausen ob Eck Airfield ^{[K]}
June 24, 2011	Madrid	Spain	Universidad Complutense de Madrid ^{[L]}
June 26, 2011	Bologna	Italy	Autodromo Enzo e Dino Ferrari ^{[M]}
June 27, 2011	Vienna	Austria	Arena Wien Open Air
June 29, 2011	Sopron	Hungary	Lover Camping ^{[N]}
July 1, 2011	Rotselaar	Belgium	Rock Werchter^{[O]}
July 2, 2011	Stuttgart	Germany	Höhenpark Killesberg
July 3, 2011	Roskilde	Denmark	Roskilde Festival^{[O]}
July 4, 2011	Hradec Králové	Czech Republic	Festival Park ^{[P]}
July 7, 2011	Lisbon	Portugal	Algés riverside ^{[Q]}
July 8, 2011	Kildare	Ireland	Punchestown Racecourse ^{[R]}
July 9, 2011	London	England	Roundhouse ^{[S]}
July 10, 2011	Kinross	Scotland	Balado Airfield ^{[T]}
August 16, 2011	Canada	Montreal	Bell Center
August 17, 2011	Canada	Toronto	Molson Canadian Amphitheatre
August 26, 2011	Reading	England	Richfield Avenue ^{[U]}
August 27, 2011	Leeds	England	Bramham Park ^{[U]}
August 28, 2011	Paris	France	Domaine National de Saint-Cloud ^{[V]}
October 28, 2011	New Orleans	United States	Voodoo Experience

List of 2012 concerts
Date	City	Country	Venue
January 20, 2012	Auckland	New Zealand	Big Day Out
January 22, 2012	Gold Coast	Australia	Big Day Out
January 24, 2012	Brisbane	Australia	Eaton Hill Hotel
January 26, 2012	Sydney	Australia	Big Day Out
January 27, 2012	Sydney	Australia	Hordern Pavilion
January 29, 2012	Melbourne	Australia	Big Day Out
January 31, 2012	Melbourne	Australia	Festival Hall
February 3, 2012	Adelaide	Australia	Big Day Out
February 5, 2012	Perth	Australia	Big Day Out
May 12, 2012	New Jersey	United States	The Bamboozle

Festivals and other miscellaneous performances
A This concert is a part of the 101.9 RXP Yule Rock Holiday Concert Show.
B This concert is a part of 9X's NBT 10.
C This concert is a part of the KRBZ's The Night the Buzz Stole Xmas show.
D This concert is a part of LIVE 105's Not So Silent Night.
E This concert is a part of 91X's Wrex the Halls.
F This concert is a part of KPNT 105.7's The Pageant.
G This concert is a part of Q101’S Twisted Show.
H This concert is a part of The Edge Jingle Bell Rock 2010
I This concert is a part of Radio 1's Big Weekend.
J This concert is a part of the Orange Warsaw festival.
K These concerts are a part of the Hurricane and Southside festivals.
L This concert is a part of the DCode Festival.
M This concert is a part of the Sonisphere festival.
N This concert is a part of the Volt Festival.
O This concert is a part of the Rock Werchter Festival.
P This concert is a part of the Rock For People festival.
Q This concert is a part of the Optimus Alive! festival.
R This concert is a part of the Oxegen festival.
S This concert is a part of the iTunes Festival
T This concert is a part of the T in the Park festival.
U These concerts are a part of the Reading and Leeds festivals.
V This concert is a part of the Rock en Seine festival.
Cancelled shows

May 24, 2011	Phoenix, United States	Marquee Theatre	This concert was cancelled because of the band's affiliation with Zach de la Rocha's Sound Strike Organisation.

== Personnel ==
My Chemical Romance

- Frank Iero — rhythm guitar, backing vocals
- Ray Toro — lead guitar, backing vocals
- Gerard Way — lead vocals
- Mikey Way — bass

Additional musicians

- Michael Pedicone — drums
- James Dewees — synth, keyboards and percussion
