= Rob Cavallo =

American record producer, musician and executive (born 1963)

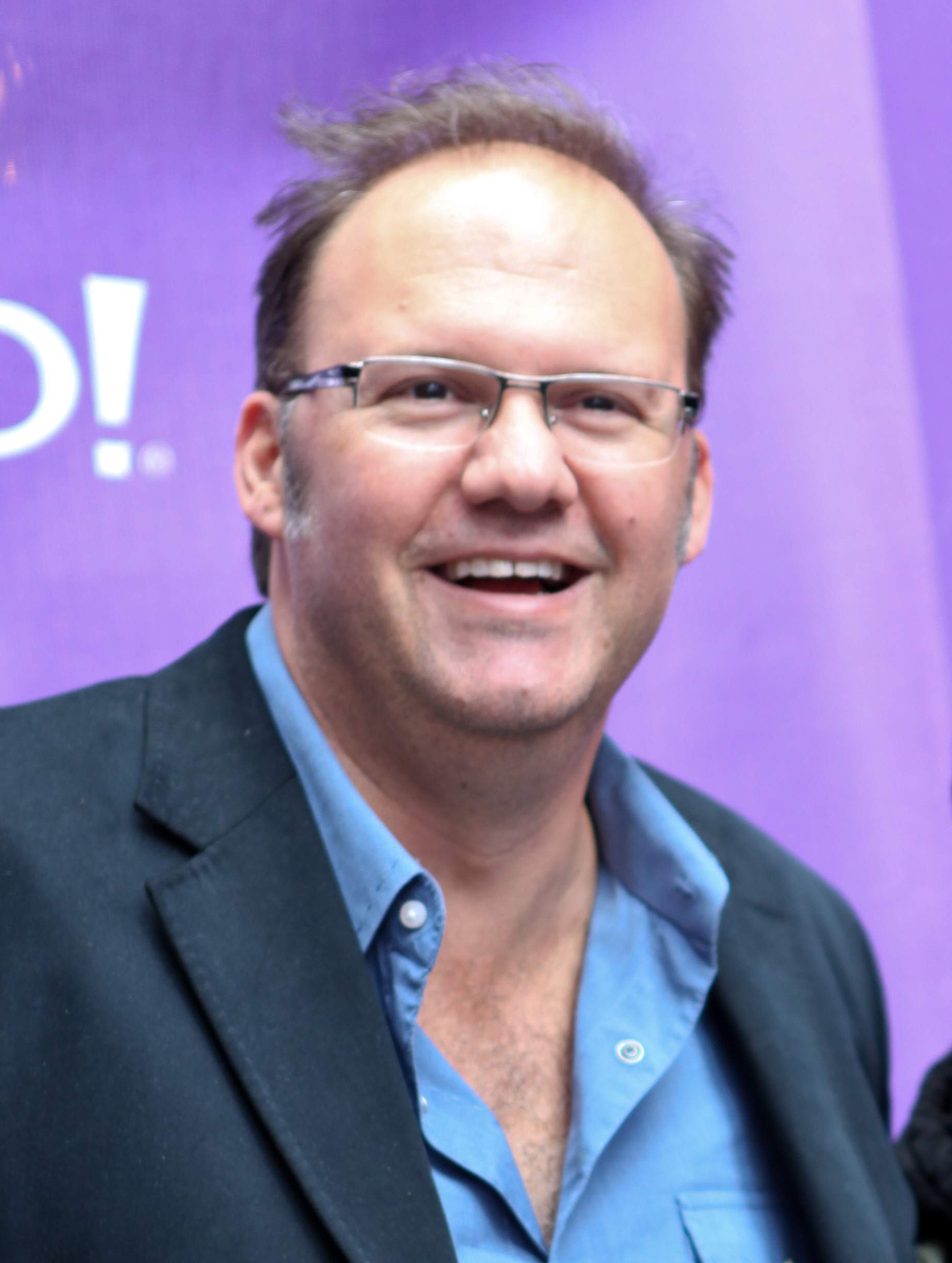
- Cavallo in 2009

Background information
- Born: Robert Siers Cavallo; March 21, 1963 (age 63); Washington, D.C., U.S.
- Genres: Pop; rock; alternative rock
- Occupations: Record producer; record executive; musician
- Instruments: Guitar; piano; keyboard; bass guitar
- Years active: 1984–present
- Labels: Warner; Reprise

Robert Siers Cavallo (born March 21, 1963) is an American record producer, musician, and record executive. He is among the biggest-selling producers in alternative music, having contributed to albums that have sold over 130 million units worldwide. He is also a three-time Grammy Award recipient.

Primarily known for his production work with Green Day, he has also worked with Linkin Park, My Chemical Romance, Eric Clapton, Beth Hart, the Goo Goo Dolls, the Dave Matthews Band, Kid Rock, Jawbreaker, Alanis Morissette, Black Sabbath, Phil Collins, Paramore, Sixpence None the Richer, Lil Peep, ONE OK ROCK, Shinedown, Beauty School Dropout and Meat Loaf.

Cavallo plays multiple instruments and has professional credits for his bass, keyboard, organ, piano, guitar and percussion work.

== Early life ==
Cavallo was born in Washington, D.C., and moved to Los Angeles, California, with his family at age 10. His interest in music began at age 11 after listening to his father's The Beatles collection. He graduated from the University of Southern California, as a member of the Sigma Alpha Mu fraternity, in 1985 with a B.A. in English. Cavallo also attended the Dick Grove School of Music.

== Career ==
Cavallo worked with George Massenburg at The Complex Recording Studios early in his career. He joined Warner Bros. Records as A&R representative in 1987 and worked with Black Sabbath as one of his first assignments. He also signed both the Goo Goo Dolls and Green Day during his first tenure at Warner Bros. Records. Cavallo became senior vice-president of A&R of Hollywood Records in 1998. He moved to Warner Music Group in 2002 and became chief creative officer of the company in 2009. He was named chairman of Warner Bros. Records in 2011, and served in that position until December 2012.

Cavallo also co-founded Level 7, a media company, with Broadcom Corporation co-founder Henry T. Nicholas III.

=== Platinum albums and tracks ===
Cavallo has produced multiple platinum-selling albums and tracks. Platinum-selling albums he has produced include:

- Green Day's Dookie, Insomniac, Nimrod, American Idiot, Bullet in a Bible, and Saviors
- Goo Goo Dolls' Dizzy Up the Girl, A Boy Named Goo and Gutterflower;
- My Chemical Romance's The Black Parade; and Danger Days: The True Lives of the Fabulous Killjoys
- Dave Matthews Band's Big Whiskey and the Groogrux King, Come Tomorrow;
- David Cook's David Cook;
- Phil Collins's Testify;
- Kid Rock's Rock n Roll Jesus;
- Shinedown's The Sound of Madness and
- Paramore's Brand New Eyes.

Tracks he produced, which were on platinum-selling albums include:

- Goo Goo Doll's "Iris" from the City of Angels soundtrack / Dizzy Up the Girl;
- Eric Clapton's "Blue Eyes Blue" from the Runaway Bride soundtrack / Clapton Chronicles;
- Phil Collins' "You'll Be in My Heart", "Son of Man", and "Strangers Like Me" from the Tarzan soundtrack;
- Alanis Morissette's "Uninvited" from City of Angels soundtrack; and
- Paramore's "Decode" from the Twilight soundtrack.

=== Other projects ===
Cavallo-produced Fleetwood Mac album Say You Will went gold in the US, Canada and Britain. Dave Matthews Band's Big Whiskey and the Groogrux King debuted at number 1 on the Billboard 200 rankings. Phil Collins' single "Can't Stop Loving You", off the Cavallo-produced album Testify, peaked at number one on the Adult Contemporary chart.

Two Cavallo-produced Goo Goo Dolls tracks, "Iris" and "Slide", were included in Billboard's top 100 pop songs 1992–2012. "Iris" was the top pop song from 1992–2012 and "Slide" was ninth-best according to Billboard's list.

Cavallo played an important role as A&R Representative for Linkin Park's single "Burn It Down" which reached the 30th position on the Billboard Hot 100 and was certified as Platinum by RIAA.

In 2021, Rob Cavallo launched Done Deal Management with music technology platform Vydia.

== Awards and recognition ==
Cavallo has won three Grammy awards: 1998 Producer of the Year; 2004 Best Rock Album for producing Green Day's American Idiot; and 2005 Record of the Year for producing Green Day's "Boulevard of Broken Dreams".

Billboard Magazine ranked Cavallo number 45 in their 2012 Power 100 rankings.
