= The Ghost of You =

2005 single by My Chemical Romance

Single by My Chemical Romance

from the album Three Cheers for Sweet Revenge
- Released: August 29, 2005
- Genre: Emo; gothic rock
- Length: 3:15
- Label: Reprise
- Songwriters: Frank Iero; Matt Pelissier; Ray Toro; Gerard Way; Mikey Way
- Producer: Howard Benson

My Chemical Romance singles chronology
"Under Pressure" (2005)	"The Ghost of You" (2005)	"Welcome to the Black Parade" (2006)

Music video
- "The Ghost of You" on YouTube "The Ghost of You" (Outtake Version) on YouTube

"The Ghost of You" is a song by the American rock band My Chemical Romance from their second studio album, Three Cheers for Sweet Revenge (2004). The song was written by band members Frank Iero, Matt Pelissier, Ray Toro, Gerard Way, and Mikey Way, and was produced by Howard Benson. "The Ghost of You" is an emo and gothic rock ballad with quiet verses and loud choruses, lyrically discussing loss and the impact of war.

The third and final single of the album, the song was released as a CD single in the United Kingdom on August 29, 2005, and was subsequently serviced to US active rock and modern rock stations on September 26. "The Ghost of You" has charted in several countries, including the United States, where it reached number 84 on the Billboard Hot 100 and number 9 on the Alternative Airplay chart. The single also topped the UK Rock & Metal Singles chart and reached number 27 on the UK singles chart. It was certified platinum by the Recording Industry Association of America (RIAA) and Music Canada, and silver by the British Phonographic Industry (BPI).

A music video for the track was directed by Marc Webb, inspired by the films Saving Private Ryan and Memphis Belle. The video, set during World War II, was split between scenes of the band performing the song at a United Service Organizations dance event, and scenes of the band charging onto a battlefield on D-Day. "The Ghost of You" received positive reviews from music critics, with praise towards its chorus and Gerard Way's vocals; it has been deemed as one of the greatest songs in My Chemical Romance's discography. The band has included the song on the set lists of their various live performances, including during the Black Parade World Tour, their reunion tour, and the Long Live The Black Parade tour.

== Background and release ==
My Chemical Romance began writing their second studio album, Three Cheers for Sweet Revenge (2004), while touring for their first album in 2003. "The Ghost of You" takes its title from a fictional advertisement from the graphic novel Watchmen, reading "Oh, how the ghost of you clings". Initially, the band intended to end "The Ghost of You" with a scream and a guitar-heavy outro. However, during the song's recording process, the producer Howard Benson convinced the band to instead end the song with a final chorus owing to his "formulaic approach" to songwriting. Towards the end of the album-recording cycle, Benson also returned to add harmonies to "The Ghost of You" after learning that Gerard Way could properly sing backing vocals.

"The Ghost of You" was initially released on June 8, 2004, as the sixth track on Three Cheers for Sweet Revenge. The song was later released on August 29, 2005, in the United Kingdom, as the album's third single. The track was also included on the 2006 live album Life on the Murder Scene and on the band's 2014 greatest hits album May Death Never Stop You. A remastered version of the track, produced by Rich Costey, appeared on the deluxe edition of Three Cheers for Sweet Revenge, alongside a 2005 live recording from BBC Radio 1's The Lock Up. A live version of "The Ghost of You", recorded during a 2010 BBC Radio 1 session, was also released as the B-side of their 2011 single "Sing". The band has also performed the song in their live shows on various occasions, including as part of the setlists of the Black Parade World Tour, the album release party for Danger Days: The True Lives of the Fabulous Killjoys (2010), the 2022 editions of Riot Fest and the When We Were Young festival, their reunion tour (2019–2023), and the Long Live The Black Parade tour (2025–2026).

== Composition and lyrics ==
"The Ghost of You"
A 19-second sample of "The Ghost of You". An emo and gothic rock song, the song relies heavily on guitars and shifts between loud choruses and quiet verses.

"The Ghost of You" is a ballad which has been described as being emo and gothic rock, with a hint of the arena rock sound the band would embrace on their subsequent album, The Black Parade (2006). The song's dynamics shift between quiet verses and loud choruses. Instrumentally, the song prominently features guitars: notably, the song opens with guitars made to sound like they are "submerged underwater", they play the same notes as the vocal melody on the line "Never coming home" in the chorus, and the bridge of the song features guitars "weaving over the wails". Mike Diver of Drowned in Sound stylistically compared the song to those by Glassjaw and Faith No More, while Winston Robbins of Consequence compared Gerard Way's "raw" and "frantic" vocal performance to that of Matt Bellamy, the lead singer of Muse. Lyrically, Arielle Gordon of Pitchfork described "The Ghost of You" as being a "seething song about loss", while Ed Walton of Distorted Sound Mag instead characterized the song as an "exploration of grief and the impact of war".

== Critical reception ==
"The Ghost of You" received positive reviews from music critics. Bram Teitelman, writing for Billboard, praised the song for being a strong ballad, particularly highlighting Gerard Way's vocals for being "much less whiny than his emo/screamo contemporaries". Diver similarly praised the single for its "soaring vocals and genuinely rockin' chorus", giving it a 6/10 ranking, while Kaj Roth of Melodic called the song a "beautiful but aggressive tune" uncharacteristic of the emo genre. Both DaveyBoy of Sputnikmusic and Andy Greenwald of Blender declared the song a highlight on Three Cheers for Sweet Revenge, with the former calling it a "cleverly placed mid-album ballad that works a treat".

The song has also been deemed as one of the best in My Chemical Romance's discography as a whole. The staff of Billboard included it in their list of the 15 best My Chemical Romance songs, with Taylor Weatherby noting how it "may not be as hook-heavy as the other singles on Three Cheers for Sweet Revenge, [but its] impassioned chorus makes it just as special". Marianne Eloise of Louder Sound placed the track at number 7 in her ranking of the band's 20 greatest songs, calling it an "eerie, earnest love song with tinges of grief", while Sam Law of Kerrang! placed the song at number 16 in his list, praising its songwriting. In rankings of the band's entire discography, Cassie Whitt and Jake Richardson of Loudwire and Chloe Spinks of Gigwise placed "The Ghost of You" at number 40 (of 71) and number 45 (of 79) respectively, with the latter writing that the song "feels a bit flaccid and a musically muddy [...] but somehow is a fan favorite".

== Commercial performance ==
In the United States, "The Ghost of You" initially debuted on the Bubbling Under Hot 100 chart in the week of November 12, 2005, before debuting and peaking at number 84 on the Billboard Hot 100, being the only new song to enter the chart in the week of January 14, 2006. The song also reached number 9 on the Alternative Airplay chart and number 38 on the Mainstream Rock chart. The Recording Industry Association of America (RIAA) certified the track platinum in 2025, signifying sales of 1,000,000 units. In the United Kingdom, the single topped the UK Rock & Metal Singles Chart, and reached number 27 on the UK Singles Chart. The song also reached number 27 on the Scottish Singles Chart and number 49 on the Irish Singles Chart. In 2024, "The Ghost of You" was certified silver by the British Phonographic Industry (BPI), signifying sales of 200,000 units, and was certified platinum by Music Canada, signifying sales of 80,000 units.

== Music video ==
=== Background and synopsis ===
Near the end of the album cycle of Three Cheers for Sweet Revenge, the band approached Warner Records about recording a music video for "The Ghost of You"; despite the record label's initial hesitancy, the band's A&R man Craig Aaronson convinced them by asking them to consider it as an investment for the band's next album. The band subsequently approached the director Marc Webb to record the music video, after having worked with him on the music videos for "I'm Not Okay (I Promise)" and "Helena". The music video was recorded at a closed set in Los Angeles on May 23 and 24, 2005. It cost just over $1 million to produce, making it one of the most-expensive music videos ever made. Gerard Way first revealed that the video was being created on May 24 in an interview with MTV News, and a clip of the video was first officially unveiled during the pre-show of the 2005 MTV Video Music Awards on August 28. The full music video was posted on MTV later that month, on August 30. A 4K restoration of the video was also released in June 2025, coinciding with the release of the deluxe edition of Three Cheers for Sweet Revenge.

According to Webb, Gerard Way had long-envisioned how the video would look, taking inspiration from the films Saving Private Ryan and Memphis Belle. Set during World War II, the video cuts between scenes of the band performing the song at a United Service Organizations dance event during verses, and combat scenes featuring the band charging into battle on D-Day during choruses. During the invasion, Mikey Way is shot and killed, leaving Gerard Way "wild with grief". The cinematic nature of the music video led Webb to shoot it similar to a period piece, stressing realism and authenticity throughout the production process. According to Gerard Way, the video was about the fear of losing individuals, reflected through themes of "war and loss and love and everything"; however, as noted by My Chemical Romance biographer Tom Bryant, the music video was also reflective of the band seeing their intense album touring cycle as "going to war".

=== Reception ===
The music video for "The Ghost of You" has been well-received by critics, with Steven Loftin of Loudwire writing that it "push[ed] the limits of what a music video could be". Weatherby called the video one of the most "cinematic" and "intense" by the band, while Law commented how the video was "a pivotal step in the band's ascent to rock's upper leagues". In rankings of the band's music videos, Aliya Chaudhry of Kerrang! placed it fourth and Alternative Press placed it fifth, with both lauding its scope. It has also performed well commercially, becoming the third-most played video on MTV2 during the week of September 26, 2005. The music video was nominated for Best Video at the 2006 Metal Hammer Golden Gods Awards.

== Credits and personnel ==
Credits are adapted from Apple Music.

My Chemical Romance
- Gerard Way – songwriter, lead vocals
- Raymond Toro – songwriter, background vocals, lead guitar
- Frank Iero – songwriter, background vocals, rhythm guitar
- Mikey Way – songwriter, bass guitar
- Matt Pelissier – songwriter, drums
Additional personnel
- Howard Benson – producer, mixing engineer, Hammond organ
- Rinat – background vocals
- Paul DeCarli – programming, editing engineer
- Rich Costey – mixing engineer
- Tom Baker – mastering engineer
- Keith Nelson – guitar technician
- Jon Nicholson – drum technician
- Eric Miller – engineer
- Mike Plotnikoff – engineer

== Charts ==
Chart (2005–06)	Peak position
Ireland (IRMA)	49
Scotland (OCC)	27
UK Singles (Official Charts)	27
UK Rock & Metal (Official Charts)	1
US Alternative Airplay (Billboard)	9
US Billboard Hot 100	84
US Mainstream Rock Airplay (Billboard)	38

== Certifications ==
Region	Certification	Certified units/sales
Canada (Music Canada)	Platinum	80,000^{‡}
New Zealand (RMNZ)	Gold	15,000^{‡}
United Kingdom (BPI)	Silver	200,000^{‡}
United States (RIAA)	Platinum	1,000,000^{‡}
^{‡} Sales+streaming figures based on certification alone.

== Release history ==
Region	Date	Format	Label(s)	Ref.
United Kingdom	August 29, 2005	CD single	Warner	
United States	September 26, 2005	Active rock; modern rock	Reprise	
Various	January 2, 2006	Digital download; streaming	Reprise; Warner	
