= Thank You for the Venom =

2004 song by My Chemical Romance

Promotional single by My Chemical Romance

from the album Three Cheers for Sweet Revenge
- B-side: "Jack the Ripper" (live)
- Released: June 8, 2004
- Genre: Punk rock
- Length: 3:41
- Label: Reprise
- Songwriters: Frank Iero; Matt Pelissier; Ray Toro; Gerard Way; Mikey Way
- Producer: Howard Benson

"Thank You for the Venom" is a song by the American rock band My Chemical Romance from their second studio album, Three Cheers for Sweet Revenge (2004). It is the ninth track on the album and was written by band members Frank Iero, Matt Pelissier, Ray Toro, Gerard Way, and Mikey Way, additionally produced by Howard Benson. It was released as a promotional single on June 8, 2004.

Described as a punk rock song, its lyrics tell the story of critics hating on the band, and telling their fans to stand up to anyone trying to change them. The song received positive reviews from critics, with some considering it one of My Chemical Romance's best songs. The song charted in the United Kingdom, reaching number 71 on the UK singles chart and number 4 on the UK Rock & Metal Singles chart. It was certified gold by the Recording Industry Association of America (RIAA) in 2025. My Chemical Romance have included "Thank You for the Venom" on the set lists of their various live performances, including during their 2007–2008 Black Parade World Tour, and their 2019–2023 reunion tour.

== Background and release ==
My Chemical Romance began writing their second studio album, Three Cheers for Sweet Revenge (2004), while touring for their first album in 2003. During occasional shows on the tour, frontman Gerard Way would come out wearing a shirt that read "Thank You for the Venom". The song's concept had already existed before the band played their first show, with the phrase printed inside the CD artwork for the band's debut album, I Brought You My Bullets, You Brought Me Your Love (2002). The band began recording Three Cheers for Sweet Revenge in 2004 after concluding a short, already scheduled tour in the United Kingdom. The album, along with "Thank You for the Venom", was produced by Howard Benson. All five band members are credited with writing the song.

Three Cheers for Sweet Revenge was released as the band's second studio album on June 8, 2004, through Reprise Records, with "Thank You for the Venom" as the ninth song on the track list. The song was released as a promotional single on the same day, with the 7-inch single release including a live rendition of Morrissey's "Jack the Ripper" as a B-side. In the United Kingdom, it reached number 71 on the UK singles chart, and number 4 on the UK Rock & Metal chart. The band also performed it live on various occasions, including during the 2006 Reading and Leeds Festivals, the 2007–2008 Black Parade World Tour, the World Contamination Tour (2010-2012), their 2019–2023 reunion tour, the 2022 Riot Fest, and the Long Live The Black Parade tour. Live performances of the song were also included on the live album, Life on the Murder Scene, which was released on March 21, 2006. A remastered version of the song, produced by Rich Costey, appeared on the 2025 deluxe edition of Revenge. Additionally, it was certified gold by the Recording Industry Association of America (RIAA) in April 2025. Unlike other singles released from Revenge, "Venom" did not receive a music video.

== Composition and lyrics ==
"Thank You for the Venom"
A 17-second sample from the first verse of "Thank You for the Venom". A punk rock song, its instrumentation has been described as "metallic guitar heroism".

"Thank You for the Venom" is a punk rock song that is three minutes and forty-one seconds long. The song begins with an opening guitar riff that Chloe Spinks of Gigwise described as "so sharp and biting you risk going into fight or flight". It then kicks into the main chorus, followed by a guitar solo at 2:12, with glam-rock influence present. The track contains lyrics such as "So give me all your poison / And give me all your pills / And give me all your hopeless hearts, and make me ill". Ed Walton of Distorted Sound claimed that the song became known for its high energy and aggressive sound. Lyrically, it is about critics that berated the band's personality, and encouraging their fans to defy outside pressure. Andrew Sacher of BrooklynVegan described the track's instrumentation as "metallic guitar heroism."

== Critical reception ==
"Thank You for the Venom" received positive reviews from music critics, with some highlighting it as a standout track from the album. Marianne Eloise of Louder Sound described "Venom" as overlooked in terms of the band's other songs, she also cited it as the best track on Revenge. She also praised its guitar solo, and placed it at number 12 on a list of the 20 greatest My Chemical Romance songs. Mike McClelland of Kludge praised the song for its lyrics and message, writing "When [it] punches out its refrain, the words "You're running after something you'll never kill," become cause to smile." A reviewer for IGN cited "Thank You for the Venom" as a highlight, along with another track on the album, "I'm Not Okay (I Promise)", stating "The high-powered sonic sentiments of "Thank You For The Venom" and "I'm Not Okay (I Promise)" should sway the naysayers."

Both Tom Bryant, also writing for Louder Sound, and Sam Law of Kerrang! ranked "Thank You for the Venom" as the band's ninth and second best song, with the latter writing "For all the talk of their inky darkness, serrated edge and unstoppable swagger, no other track manages to pack in all those elements half as convincingly as this snarling classic". DaveyBoy, a staff writer of Sputnikmusic claimed it was "extremely catchy and memorable from start to beginning." In rankings of the band's entire discography, Cassie Whitt and Jake Richardson of Loudwire and Spinks placed the song at number 9 (of 71) and number 2 (of 79) respectively, with the latter writing that it is a complete and utter masterpiece. Additionally, Eloise, writing for The Forty-Five, placed it at number 1 (of 46) in her review, stating it was a "fast [and] wild song", and also citing the chorus as My Chemical Romance's most iconic chorus of all time.

== Credits and personnel ==
Credits are adapted from Apple Music.

=== My Chemical Romance ===
- Gerard Way – lead vocals, songwriter,
- Ray Toro – lead guitar, background vocals, songwriter
- Frank Iero – rhythm guitar, background vocals, songwriter
- Mikey Way – bass guitar, songwriter
- Matt Pelissier – drums, songwriter

=== Additional personnel ===
- Howard Benson – producer, mixing engineer
- Paul DeCarli – editing engineer
- Tom Baker – mastering engineer
- Keith Nelson – guitar technician
- Jon Nicholson – drum technician
- Eric Miller – engineer
- Mike Plotnikoff – engineer

== Charts ==
Chart performance
Chart (2004)	Peak position
UK Singles (Official Charts)	71
UK Rock & Metal (Official Charts)	4

== Certifications ==
Certifications
Region	Certification	Certified units/sales
United States (RIAA)	Gold	500,000^{‡}
^{‡} Sales+streaming figures based on certification alone.
