= You Know What They Do to Guys Like Us in Prison =

2004 song by My Chemical Romance

Song by My Chemical Romance

from the album Three Cheers for Sweet Revenge
- Released: June 8, 2004
- Genre: Emo
- Length: 2:53
- Label: Reprise
- Songwriters: Frank Iero; Matt Pelissier; Ray Toro; Gerard Way; Mikey Way
- Producer: Howard Benson

"You Know What They Do to Guys Like Us in Prison" is a song by the American rock band My Chemical Romance, released as the fourth track from their second studio album, Three Cheers for Sweet Revenge (2004). The song was written by the band and produced by Howard Benson. "You Know What They Do to Guys Like Us in Prison" is an emo song primarily inspired by the lead vocalist Gerard Way's relationship with the Used's Bert McCracken, who also provides backing vocals for the track. The track tells the narrative of a prisoner who panics about his life in prison, while touching on themes of masculinity and sexual fluidity.

"You Know What They Do to Guys Like Us in Prison" received acclaim from music critics for its lyrics and sound, and has been deemed a fan favorite; multiple critics have also identified the track as being one of the best in My Chemical Romance's discography. The track was frequently performed in the band's live shows prior to the release of the band's fourth album Danger Days: The True Lives of the Fabulous Killjoys (2010), and was later performed as part of their reunion tour. The track was also included on the band's 2014 greatest hits album May Death Never Stop You. It has been certified gold by the Recording Industry Association of America.

== Background and release ==
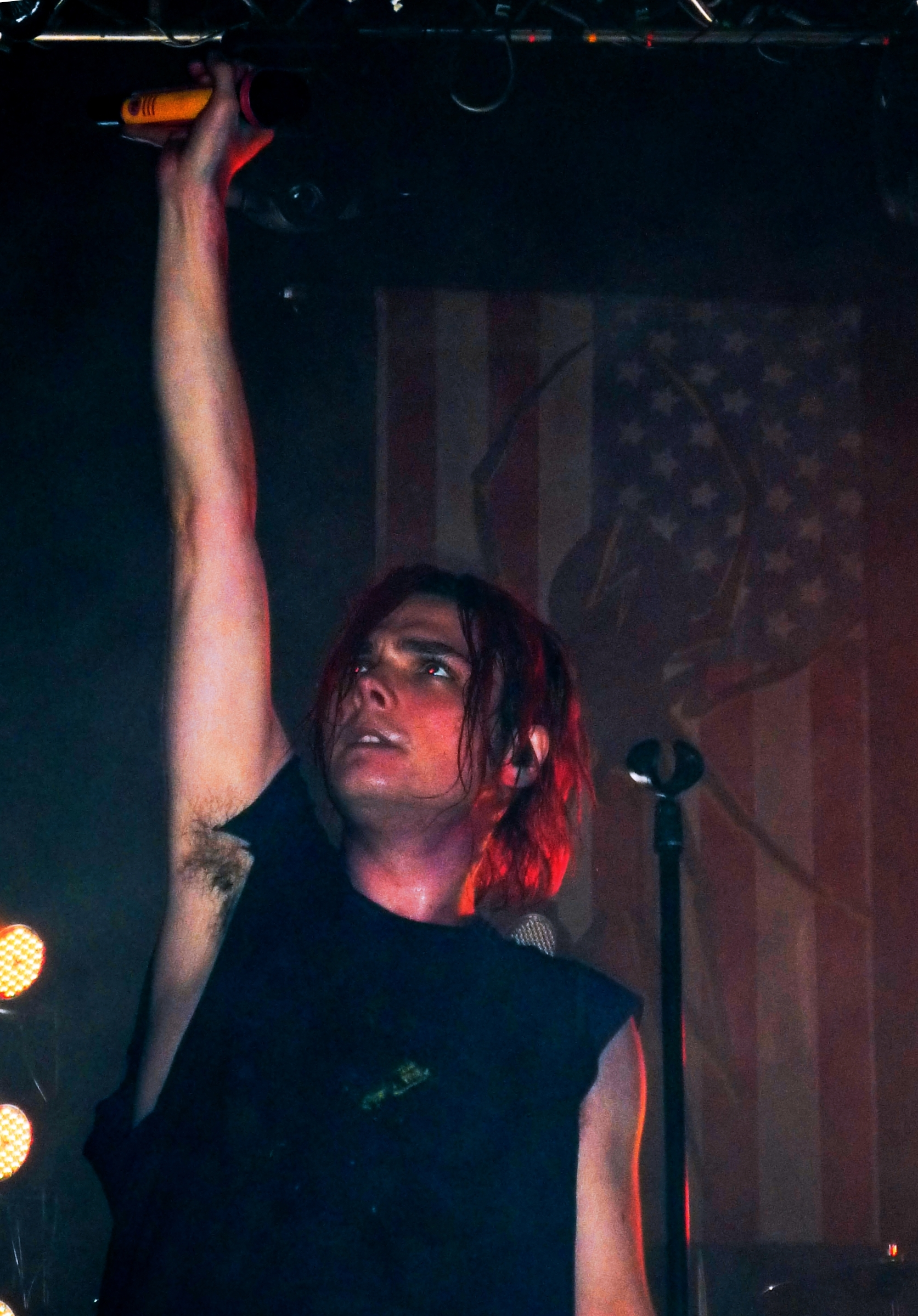
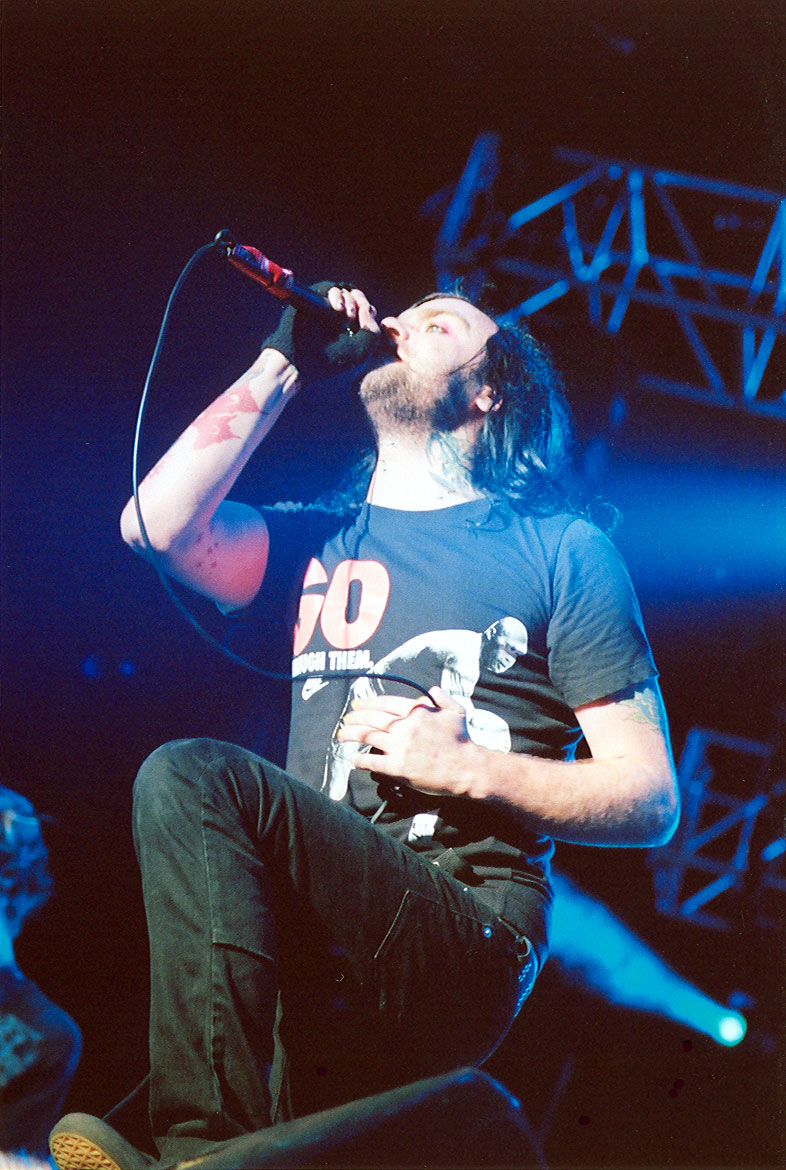
"You Know What They Do to Guys Like Us in Prison" was inspired by Gerard Way's (left) relationship with Bert McCracken (right).

My Chemical Romance had first supported the Used during a concert in November 2002, and the two bands subsequently began touring together in February 2003. During this time, the frontmen of the two bands, Gerard Way and Bert McCracken, quickly formed a close friendship; Way later said he wanted McCracken to sing on "You Know What They Do to Guys Like Us in Prison" due to him being "one of the few people that I've met on the road and really connected with". Way additionally noted how he embraced method acting while recording the song, performing in an attic while "[not] wearing very many clothes" and playing pornography in the room.

"You Know What They Do to Guys Like Us in Prison" was released on June 8, 2004, as the fourth track on Three Cheers for Sweet Revenge. A live recording of the track was subsequently included on the 2006 live album Life on the Murder Scene, and the song appeared on the band's 2014 greatest hits album May Death Never Stop You despite never having been released as a single. Additionally, a remastered version of the track, produced by Rich Costey, appeared on the deluxe edition of Three Cheers for Sweet Revenge, alongside a 2005 live recording from BBC Radio 1's The Lock Up.

"You Know What They Do to Guys Like Us in Prison" was also a live staple for the band prior to the release of their album Danger Days: The True Lives of the Fabulous Killjoys, being deemed a "live favorite" for both My Chemical Romance and their fans. My Chemical Romance has included it in the setlists of their 2004 KROQ Almost Acoustic Christmas performance (accompanied by McCracken), the 2005 Warped Tour, the 2007–2008 Black Parade World Tour, and their 2019–2023 reunion tour (featuring Sara Taylor of Youth Code during their first show in 2019). On April 11, 2025, the song was certified gold by the Recording Industry Association of America.

== Composition and lyrics ==
"You Know What They Do to Guys Like Us in Prison"
A 17-second sample from the start of "You Know What They Do to Guys Like Us in Prison". An emo song, the track begins with a staccato piano line before guitars and drums enter and dominate the instrumentation.

"You Know What They Do to Guys Like Us in Prison" is an emo song which Kirk Miller of Rolling Stone characterized as being a "thrash-cabaret hybrid". It was written by band members Gerard Way, Ray Toro, Frank Iero, Mikey Way, and Matt Pelissier, and was produced by Howard Benson. The song begins with a quietly-played staccato piano line and a restrained sound which Terry Bezer of Louder Sound referred to as "gothic shoegazing", before exploding into a "high-octane" sound dominated by guitars and drums. Winston Robbins of Consequence stylistically compared the song to "Killer Queen" by Queen, particularly in Gerard Way's vocal delivery, while Johnny Loftus of AllMusic compared the song to those by At the Drive-In.

Lyrically, "You Know What They Do to Guys Like Us in Prison" follows a "sheltered" protagonist who is arrested at a gunfight and imprisoned, whereupon he begins to panic about his life in jail. The song is tied to the loose narrative of Three Cheers for Sweet Revenge featuring lovers killed in a gunfight, with Arielle Gordon of Pitchfork calling the track the "most successful manifestation of the album's concept". The song features backing vocals and screams from McCracken, who enters around the one-minute mark and sings certain lines alongside Way. Way has cited touring with the Used as the inspiration for "You Know What They Do to Guys Like Us in Prison", commenting that it "feels like jail when you've got eight or nine guys in a van" and comparing McCracken to a "cellmate". Way has also cited a night where he and McCracken "drained a hotel minibar, smoked pack after pack of cigarettes, and annihilated themselves" as partially inspiring the song.

Additionally, according to My Chemical Romance biographer Tom Bryant, the song was inspired by a kiss shared by Way and McCracken during a game of truth or dare. Way has commented how "You Know What They Do to Guys Like Us in Prison" touches on themes of "lost masculinity", as a result of him being surrounded by men while touring. These themes have been noticed by music critics, with Andy Greenwald of Spin writing that the track "dabbled in homoerotic vaudeville" and Taylor Markarian of Loudwire pointing out specific lyrics like "how we're just two men as God had made us" and "they make me do push-ups in drag" as depicting sexual fluidity and the norms of masculinity.

== Reception ==
"You Know What They Do to Guys Like Us in Prison" has been deemed a fan favorite, and has received acclaim from music critics, with particular praise towards its lyrics and sound. Loftus, in a review of the album, lauded the song for its vivid imagery and its "claustrophobic, messy, and juiced with adrenaline" nature. Gordon praised the track for its use of both drama and black humor, while Miller noted how the song exemplified the "sneaky sense of humor" and metal licks present on Three Cheers for Sweet Revenge as a whole. Jasamine White-Gluz of Exclaim! wrote how "it's hard not to enjoy" the track due to its "ragtime punk feel".

The staff of Billboard has ranked the song the second-best deep cut by a rock band in the 21st century, with Kevin Rutherford writing that it should have been released as a single despite not having an "immediate, candy-sweet hook". The song has also performed well in rankings of My Chemical Romance's discography, with the staffs of Spin and Billboard including the song in their lists of the band's 10 and 15 best songs, respectively. Andy Belt of PopMatters included the song in his list of the top 15 songs by the band, noting how the band could "make existence sound like an absolute nightmare" on the track. Both Sam Law of Kerrang! and Marianne Eloise of Louder Sound included the song in their respective lists of the 20 greatest songs by the band, with the latter praising the band for being "at their campest and weirdest best" on the track. In rankings of the band's discography as a whole, Chloe Spinks of Gigwise ranked the song number 3 (out of 79), lauding its lyrics and musical dynamics, while Cassie Whitt and Jake Richardson of Loudwire ranked it number 6 (out of 71).

== Credits and personnel ==
Credits are adapted from Apple Music.

My Chemical Romance
- Gerard Way – songwriter, lead vocals
- Raymond Toro – songwriter, background vocals, lead guitar
- Frank Iero – songwriter, background vocals, rhythm guitar
- Mikey Way – songwriter, bass guitar
- Matt Pelissier – songwriter, drums, percussion
Additional personnel
- Howard Benson – producer, mixing engineer
- Bert McCracken – vocals
- Paul DeCarli – programming, editing engineer
- Ted Jensen – mastering engineer
- Keith Nelson – guitar technician
- Jon Nicholson – drum technician
- Eric Miller – engineer
- Mike Plotnikoff – engineer

== Certifications ==
Region	Certification	Certified units/sales
United States (RIAA)	Gold	500,000^{‡}
^{‡} Sales+streaming figures based on certification alone.
