= I'm Not Okay (I Promise) =

2004 single by My Chemical Romance

Single by My Chemical Romance

from the album Three Cheers for Sweet Revenge
- Released: September 27, 2004
- Genre: Pop-punk; emo; emo pop
- Length: 3:08
- Label: Reprise
- Songwriters: Frank Iero; Matt Pelissier; Ray Toro; Gerard Way; Mikey Way
- Producer: Howard Benson

My Chemical Romance singles chronology
"Headfirst for Halos" (2004)	"I'm Not Okay (I Promise)" (2004)	"Helena" (2005)

Music video
- "I'm Not Okay (I Promise)" on YouTube

Outtake videos
- "I'm Not Okay (I Promise)" (Outtake Version 1) on YouTube "I'm Not Okay (I Promise)" (Outtake Version 2) on YouTube

"I'm Not Okay (I Promise)" is a song by the American rock band My Chemical Romance from their second studio album, Three Cheers for Sweet Revenge (2004). "I'm Not Okay (I Promise)" is a pop-punk, emo, and emo pop song, conceived and recorded after the A&R man Craig Aaronson and the producer Howard Benson found a vocal line in a previously recorded demo, and urged the group to build it into a complete song. The track was written by band members Frank Iero, Matt Pelissier, Ray Toro, Gerard Way, and Mikey Way, and was produced by Benson.

The track was released as the album's lead single on September 27, 2004, being serviced to US alternative radio stations. "I'm Not Okay (I Promise)" has charted in several countries, including in the United States where it became the band's first song to enter the Billboard Hot 100 and reached number 4 on the Alternative Airplay chart. The track was certified three-times platinum by the Recording Industry Association of America (RIAA), signifying sales of three million units. The single also peaked at number 19 on the UK singles chart and at number 9 on the UK Rock & Metal Singles chart, and was certified platinum by the British Phonographic Industry (BPI).

Two accompanying music videos for "I'm Not Okay (I Promise)" were produced. The second of the two, directed by Marc Webb, was inspired by Rushmore and is structured like a movie trailer starring the band members as nerds being bullied by jocks. The song received positive reviews from music critics, who deemed it both as a standout on Three Cheers for Sweet Revenge and of the band's discography as a whole; the track was nominated for Best Single at the 2005 Kerrang! Awards. My Chemical Romance has included "I'm Not Okay (I Promise)" on the set lists of their various live performances, including as the opening song during their first performance on their reunion tour. The track has also been identified as a defining song of the 2000s, and has been credited for bringing emo culture into the mainstream.

== Background and release ==
My Chemical Romance began writing their second studio album, Three Cheers for Sweet Revenge (2004), while touring for their first album in 2003. After the band had finished writing the majority of the album, their A&R man Craig Aaronson and their producer Howard Benson stumbled on a vocal line and chord progression six minutes into a song on a demo the band had previously recorded; both insisted that the band should work on it. Despite the band's initial reluctance, they realized its potential once Gerard Way and Ray Toro performed the section, with Frank Iero recalling that "it was just the most beautiful song we ever heard". After the band returned to the studio, they continued to experiment with the demo and "pushing the boundaries of its punk sound", eventually forming a finished version of "I'm Not Okay (I Promise)". The song was produced by Benson, and mixed by Rich Costey.

"I'm Not Okay (I Promise)" was initially released on June 8, 2004, as the fifth track on Three Cheers for Sweet Revenge. The song later impacted US radio on September 27, 2004, as the album's lead single. Various live performances of the track were later released on March 21, 2006, as part of the live album Life on the Murder Scene, and it was included on May Death Never Stop You (2014), the band's greatest hits album. Additionally, a remastered version of the track, produced by Costey, appeared on a deluxe edition of Three Cheers for Sweet Revenge, alongside a 2005 live recording from BBC Radio 1's The Lock Up.

== Composition and lyrics ==
"I'm Not Okay (I Promise)"
An 18-second sample of "I'm Not Okay (I Promise)". A pop-punk, emo, and emo pop song, it heavily uses power chords and has a guitar solo which has been stylistically compared to Queen

"I'm Not Okay (I Promise)" is an "outsider anthem" described as pop-punk, emo, and emo pop. It has a length of three minutes and eight seconds. Instrumentally, the song is centered around "chunky" power chords, and contains a guitar solo featuring two guitar lines a harmonic third apart. Various elements of the song, including its guitar solo and vocal harmonies, were inspired by the material of Queen; Benson explained how the song served as the "prototype" for the Queen influences on the band's subsequent album, The Black Parade (2006). Additionally, both Matthew Butler of Drowned in Sound and a review for NME compared the track to the material released by Blink-182, with the former calling it an "exhilarating burst of snotty punk".

Lyrically, "I'm Not Okay (I Promise)" is about a "cracking-at-the-teary-seams relationship", and also deals with themes of high school peer pressure and suicide. Way explained in an interview with MTV News that the song was inspired by the emotions he felt after a girl he was interested in took "really sleazy photographs with her boyfriend", and described it as a "cry for help trapped in a pop song". Arielle Gordon of Pitchfork noted that its lyrics "state pent-up vindictive frustration outright", particularly the track's blunt chorus of "I'm not OK / You wear me out". Way explained the line as a "declaration for [the] kids who would become our fans", and added that its message bridged across to "normal people [...] who were tired of pretending to be something they're not".

== Critical reception ==
Upon the release of Three Cheers for Sweet Revenge, multiple music critics deemed it a highlight on the album. (Note: Attributed to Rolling Stone's Kirk Miller, Blender's Andy Greenwald, and album reviews on IGN and Sputnikmusic.) A contemporary review for NME quipped that the track was "considerably better than 'okay'", while Butler, in a 7/10 review of the single, lauded its chorus as "packing such a large punch it's hard not to be knocked out". Gordon praised how the song "approached the desolation in its lyrics with almost triumphant glee", noting how it avoided being self-parody by taking its message "deadly serious". Additionally, Terry Bezer of Louder Sound called it the "most perfect three-and-a-half minutes of teen angst in a decade".

=== Rankings ===
"I'm Not Okay (I Promise)" has been deemed one of the best tracks in My Chemical Romance's discography as a whole, with Fall Out Boy bassist Pete Wentz calling it his favorite and noting that the song cemented My Chemical Romance as a "band to be reckoned with". The staff of Billboard included the track in their list of the 15 best My Chemical Romance songs, with Taylor Weatherby writing that it was "perhaps the most emo-of-all-emo anthems". Cassie Whitt and Jake Richardson, writing for Loudwire, placed the track at number 2 in their ranking of the band's entire discography behind "Welcome to the Black Parade", with the latter calling it "one of the most relatable emo songs ever written". Both Margaret Farrell of Stereogum and Margaret Eloise of Louder Sound called it the band's third-best track, with the former praising its cathartic message, while Bryant, also writing for Louder Sound, called it the band's fourth-best song, describing it as a "quite brilliant slice of angst and outsider defiance". Both Sam Law of Kerrang! and Andy Belt of PopMatters ranked "I'm Not Okay (I Promise)" as the band's fifth-best track, both praising its anthemic sound. Chloe Spinks of Gigwise placed the song at number 7 in her ranking of the band's entire discography, writing that it "may just be the quintessential MCR track".

The song has also been placed in rankings beyond those of the band's discography. Lists of the 100 best emo songs in both Vulture and The Boston Phoenix included the track, with Nina Corcoran of the former highlighting how it "made the misunderstood look familiar, the goths look friendly, and depression look flattering". The staff of Spin ranked the chorus of "I'm Not Okay (I Promise)" as the 12th-best pop punk chorus of the 21st century. Chad Childers, writing for Loudwire, declared "I'm Not Okay (I Promise)" to be the best rock song of 2004, beating the runner-ups "Boulevard of Broken Dreams", "Broken", and "I Miss You", while the staff of Billboard place it at number 68 in their ranking of the 100 greatest songs of the year. The 2018 list by Rolling Stone named the song one of the 100 greatest tracks of the 21st century.

=== Accolades ===
Nominations for "I'm Not Okay (I Promise)"
Award	Category	Result	Ref.
Kerrang! Awards 2005	Best Single	Nominated	

== Commercial performance ==
In the United States, "I'm Not Okay (I Promise)" peaked at number 86 on the Billboard Hot 100, and number 4 on the Alternative Airplay chart, becoming the first track by the band to enter the Billboard Hot 100. In 2019, following the announcement of the band's reunion, "I'm Not Okay (I Promise)" also debuted and peaked at number 21 on the Hot Rock & Alternative Songs chart. The Recording Industry Association of America (RIAA) certified the single 3-times platinum in the United States in 2025, certifying sales of at least three million units, while Music Canada certified the song as double platinum in the country in 2024.

Upon its release in the United Kingdom, "I'm Not Okay (I Promise)" debuted and peaked at number 96 on the UK Singles chart and number 9 on the UK Rock & Metal Singles Chart. The single re-entered the UK Singles chart in March 2005, peaking at number 19, and additionally number 23 on the Scottish Singles Chart. The British Phonographic Industry (BPI) certified the single platinum in 2023. The song also charted at number 38 on the New Zealand singles chart and at number 65 on the ARIA Singles Chart in Australia, and was certified platinum in 2024 by Recorded Music NZ.

== Music videos ==
=== Background and synopses ===
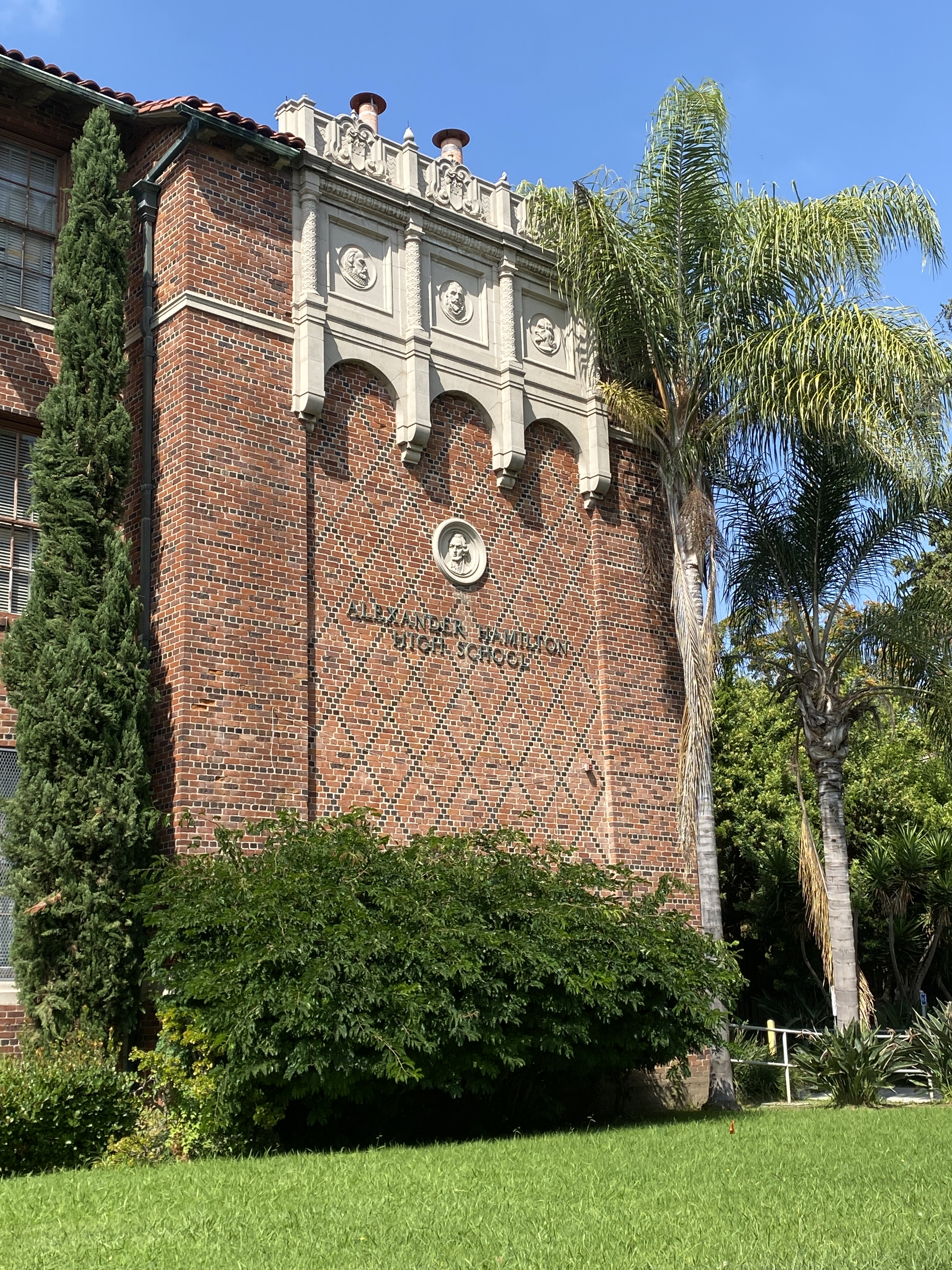
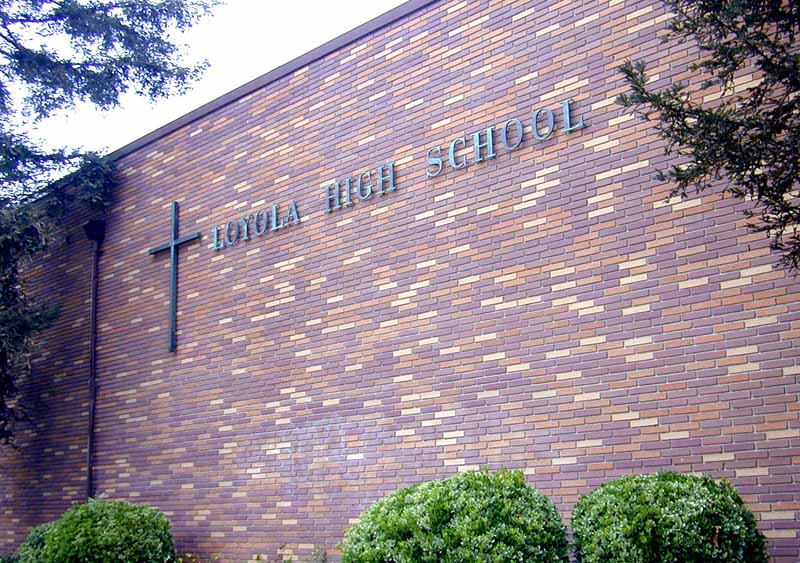
The filming locations for the music video of "I'm Not Okay (I Promise)": Alexander Hamilton High School (left) and Loyola High School (right).

Initially, a first accompanying music video for "I'm Not Okay (I Promise)" was produced, featuring a montage of a concert and pictures of the Way brothers as children. In mid-2004, shortly after Bob Bryar joined the band as their drummer to replace Pelissier, a second music video, directed by Marc Webb, was produced to promote the single's release.

Initially, the band wanted the video to showcase them performing the song at a high school pep rally in a style reminiscent of Wes Anderson's 1998 film Rushmore. This led to Webb suggesting that the video take the form of a movie trailer for what Kenneth Partridge of Billboard later described as the "greatest teen dramedy never made". In the finished product, the Way brothers, Toro, and Iero play "preppy, weird and croquet-playing nerds" who are being bullied by jocks. The video shows the group taking revenge on their bullies, featuring a series of "antics, pranks and twists". The video culminates with the two groups preparing to fight, left as a cliffhanger ending.

This video was filmed at Alexander Hamilton High School and Loyola High School in August 2004. Interspersed throughout the school scenes is footage of the band performing "I'm Not Okay (I Promise)" in a rehearsal space. Bryar, who at that point had not yet played with the band, was included in the video playing the drums despite having a broken ankle; he later remarked that the move was "the riskiest thing this band has ever done", noting that it "would have been a disaster" if he did not ultimately go on to perform with the band. The music video received frequent airplay on MTV2 and MTVU, and both versions were released as part of Life on the Murder Scene.

=== Reception ===
The first music video for "I'm Not Okay (I Promise)" has ranked poorly in retrospective reviews of the band's videos, with Alternative Press bluntly writing that "this isn't the video you associate with [the] single". In contrast, the second music video received widespread praise from critics, with Aliya Chaudhry of Kerrang! and Alternative Press placing the video at number 2 and 3 respectively in their rankings. Eloise called the video "kinetic and unforgettable", while Weatherby referred to it as "iconic". Andy Greenwald, writing for Spin, noticed similarities to the 1979 film Quadrophenia, while Emma Keates of The A.V. Club characterized it as an effective combination of "hardcore aesthetics and [films by] John Hughes". The video has appeared on two critic's lists about the greatest videos set in high schools, and Webb was reportedly approached about turning it into a full-length film.

== Live performances and legacy ==
"I'm Not Okay (I Promise)" has been a staple in My Chemical Romance's performances, with Chad Childers of Loudwire reporting in 2024 that it was the band's most-played song during live sets. In regards to individual performances, My Chemical Romance performed the song on Late Show with David Letterman in January 2005, during the 2011 Reading and Leeds Festivals, the 2022 Riot Fest, and the 2022 and 2024 editions of When We Were Young festival. The band also performed the song as part of the setlists and encores of the Black Parade World Tour, the 2007 Projekt Revolution tour, the 10th Annual Honda Civic Tour, their reunion tour (being the first song performed during their first reunion show in 2019), and the Long Live The Black Parade tour. Additionally, "I'm Not Okay (I Promise)" has been covered by various artists, including by Matt Pond PA (for the 2008 compilation album Guilt by Association Vol. 2), Set It Off, All Time Low, Twenty One Pilots (in live performances), and Cassyette (in a short video for TikTok). Iero also referenced the song in the lead single of his solo album Barriers (2019), in the line: "And I promise that I'm not okay / (Oh, wait, that's the other guy)"; he explained how this reference was intended to connect his solo career with his time with My Chemical Romance, and noted that he had discussed the lyric reference with his bandmates before the single's release.

"I'm Not Okay (I Promise)" has been identified as My Chemical Romance's breakout single, with David McLaughlin of Kerrang! writing that it cemented them as "icons of the third wave of emo", and has been credited for bringing emo culture into the mainstream. It has also been considered a defining track of the 2000s, with Bezer comparing it to songs like "My Generation", "Anarchy in the UK", "Smells Like Teen Spirit", and "Killing in the Name" for being a "zeitgeist-capturing, generation-defining statement". Sia Michel of The New York Times wrote in 2006 that the track had become a "rallying cry" for the children of that time who had been "weaned on war, school shootings and constant terrorism threats". Ed Walton of Distorted Sound Mag referred to "I'm Not Okay (I Promise)" as an "anthem for the emo generation", while a 2020 article on Louder Sound similarly called it a "genuine anthem for the disaffected, still sounding as righteously pissed off and fresh as it did almost a decade ago". I'm Not Okay: An Emo Retrospective, a 2024–2025 exhibition at the Barbican Music Library in London that explored 2000s emo subculture, was named after the song.

== Credits and personnel ==
Credits are adapted from Apple Music.

My Chemical Romance
- Gerard Way – lead vocals, background vocals, songwriter
- Raymond Toro – background vocals, lead guitar, rhythm guitar, songwriter
- Frank Iero – background vocals, rhythm guitar, songwriter
- Mikey Way – bass guitar, songwriter
- Matt Pelissier – drums, percussion, songwriter

Additional performing artists

- Howard Benson – Hammond organ, producer, mixing engineer
- Paul DeCarli – programming, recording engineer
Additional personnel
- Rich Costey – mixing engineer
- Tom Baker – mastering engineer
- Mike Plotnikoff – recording engineer
- Keith Nelson – guitar technician, recording technician
- Jon Nicholson – drum technician, recording technician
- Eric Miller – additional engineer

== Charts ==
=== Weekly charts ===
Chart (2004−2005)	Peak position
Australia (ARIA)	65
European Hot 100 Singles (Billboard)	67
New Zealand (Recorded Music NZ)	38
Scottish Singles Sales (Official Charts)	23
UK Singles (Official Charts)	19
UK Rock & Metal (Official Charts)	9
US Billboard Hot 100	86
US Alternative Airplay (Billboard)	4

Chart (2019)	Peak position
US Hot Rock & Alternative Songs (Billboard)	21

=== Year-end charts ===
Chart (2005)	Position
US Modern Rock Tracks (Billboard)	27

== Certifications ==
Region	Certification	Certified units/sales
Canada (Music Canada)	2× Platinum	160,000^{‡}
New Zealand (RMNZ)	Platinum	30,000^{‡}
United Kingdom (BPI)	Platinum	600,000^{‡}
United States (RIAA)	3× Platinum	3,000,000^{‡}
^{‡} Sales+streaming figures based on certification alone.

== Release history ==
Region	Date	Format	Label(s)	Ref.
Various	September 13, 2004	Digital download; streaming	Reprise; Warner	
United States	September 27, 2004	Alternative radio	Reprise	
Australia	December 7, 2004	CD single	Warner	
United Kingdom	March 7, 2005	CD single	Reprise	
