= The Black Parade World Tour =

2007–2008 concert tour by My Chemical Romance

- Tour by My Chemical Romance
- Promotional poster example
- Associated album: The Black Parade
- Start date: February 22, 2007
- End date: May 9, 2008
- No. of shows: 133
- Supporting acts: Muse; Rise Against

My Chemical Romance concert chronology
- Three Cheers for Sweet Revenge Tour (2005); The Black Parade World Tour (2007–2008) Projekt Revolution 2007; The World Contamination Tour (2010–2012)

The Black Parade World Tour was a concert tour by the American rock band My Chemical Romance in support of their third studio album, The Black Parade (2006). The tour began on February 22, 2007, in Manchester, New Hampshire and concluded on May 9, 2008, in New York City. The tour consisted of 133 shows, spanning across five different continents, ranging from cities like the aforementioned New York City to Buenos Aires and Moscow.

For the first half of the tour, My Chemical Romance would play The Black Parade in its entirety dressed up as an alter-ego marching band named after the album. After playing the album in its entirety, the band would then play a selection of songs from their previous albums. These shows saw extensive use of theatrics and additional stage elements, such as pyrotechnics and blimps that would rise over the stage. Tour shows would follow this format until October 7, 2007, when the "Black Parade" persona was "killed off" in Mexico City and they stopped playing the full record. Future shows, while still promoting The Black Parade, featured more varied set lists.

The tour received positive reviews from journalists, who highlighted the theatrical elements of the shows as well as the performances of the band, specifically front man Gerard Way. According to the Billboard Boxscore, the tour generated an average of $183,600 in revenue per show, with an average of 5,415 tickets sold per date. The October 7 show was later released as the live album The Black Parade Is Dead! in 2008. In 2021, Kerrang! ranked it as one of the best concert tours of all time. A second concert tour themed around The Black Parade, Long Live The Black Parade, began in 2025 and concluded in 2026.

== Background and development ==
My Chemical Romance released their third studio album, The Black Parade, on October 23, 2006, through Reprise Records. A concept album, it centers around a man dying from cancer, known as "the Patient", who reflects upon his life as he nears his death, which is presented to him in the form of his fondest childhood memory: seeing a marching band. This also led to the creation of an alter-ego band named after the album, simply titled "The Black Parade". To promote the album, My Chemical Romance would perform around 60 standalone shows throughout 2006.

On December 18, 2006, My Chemical Romance announced the first leg of the Black Parade World Tour, consisting of 17 dates at stadiums throughout the United States. Around the same time, a set of dates for the United Kingdom were announced. A second leg with 18 more dates was announced on February 1, 2007, with all set in the United States except for one show in Vancouver. Shortly afterwards, 7 stops at Canadian cities were announced. The tour continued to announce more, and it formally began on February 22 in Manchester, New Hampshire. The European leg of the tour started on March 20, and by May they were back in the United States for a second North American leg. They then went to Europe again shortly afterwards. The band then went to Mexico in October to play a show, went back to their home state of New Jersey, and then returned to Europe in November.

On October 7, 2007, My Chemical Romance "killed off" the "Black Parade" persona at their performance at the Palacio de los Deportes in Mexico City. While the tour continued beyond this point until the aforementioned performance at the Madison Square Garden, the band would no longer perform as "The Black Parade", nor would they play the album in its entirety. This date was the initial planned conclusion of the whole tour, although with the continued commercial success of The Black Parade, which by then had become a cultural phenomenon, the band felt that they had to continue playing. The continuation of the tour was also connected to frontman Gerard Way's desire to play a "dream show" at the Madison Square Garden. The performance in Mexico City was recorded and released as the live album The Black Parade Is Dead! in 2008.

The band continued on with the tour in December 2007 with a series of dates of Australia, New Zealand, and Asia. The band then kept up with the tour throughout 2008, with January bringing them back to Asia, February bringing the band to South America, and March taking them back to Europe once more. In April, the band returned to the United States for the final leg of the tour, which concluded on May 9, 2008, with their performance at the Madison Square Garden. By the end of the tour, the band had played about 133 shows within 400 days across the world, ranging from cities such as Buenos Aires to Moscow, though some of these dates were cancelled.

Throughout the course of the tour, the band suffered extreme burnout and sustained several injuries and illnesses. These ranged from depression to food poisoning. Consequentially, some members had to be hospitalized and two tour dates were cancelled. On January 11, 2007, Frank Iero temporarily left the tour because of an unspecified illness, being replaced by Drive By guitarist Todd Price. Drummer Bob Bryar sustained wrist injuries at one point which evolved into carpal tunnel syndrome. Additionally, bassist Mikey Way took time off to get married and spend time with his new wife, Alicia Simmons, and was replaced by guitar tech Matt Cortez from April 18, 2007, until October 4, 2007.

== Production ==
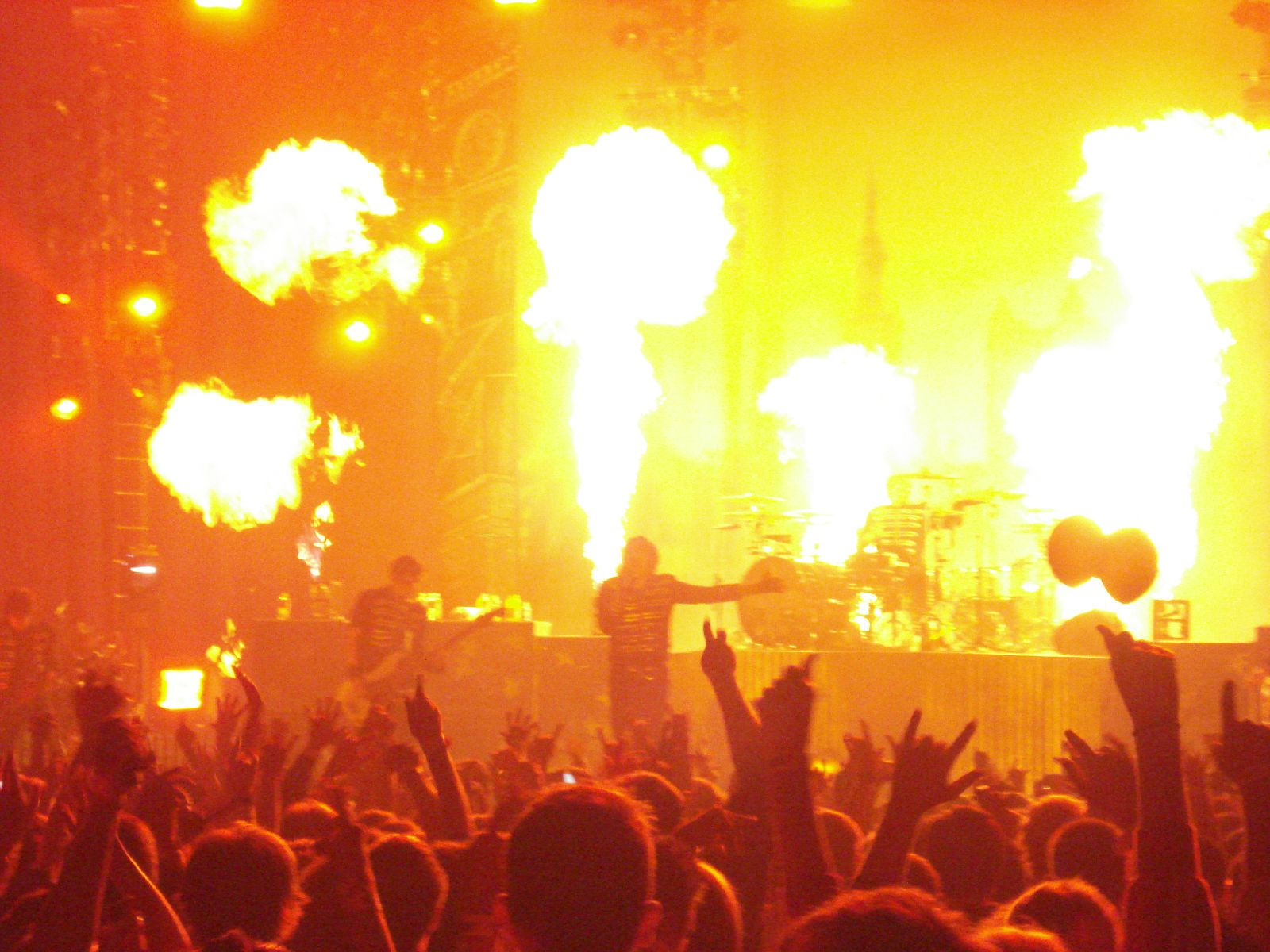
The stage design for the shows (left) was based on the setting of the "Welcome to the Black Parade" music video, and pyrotechnics would be used during the show on certain songs (right).

The Black Parade World Tour was noted for its "theatrical"-styled production. When conceptualizing the tour and its set design, Gerard Way felt the need to make The Black Parade everything that he imagined it could be, and that if the band worked hard on creating the album, they were going to ensure a "special" experience when playing it live. The band also felt that if they were asking fans to go to shows set in arenas, then they owed them a large-scale performance. To focus on this element behind the tour, the band was generally less energetic and chaotic while on stage in comparison to previous tours.

Almost every idea that the band had for the tours production was utilized; the stage elements reportedly required seven trucks to move around from show to show, in addition to four buses needed to transport the band itself as well as the production crew. The elaborate stage design for the shows was largely reminiscent of the city skyline present in the background of the music video for "Welcome to the Black Parade". Pyrotechnics saw extensive use as well, going off during certain songs. At one point in the show, black and white blimps would emerge from each side of the stage and float above the crowd. The band's "Black Parade" uniforms were designed by Colleen Atwood.

== Concert synopsis ==
Each night of the Black Parade World Tour would begin with Gerard Way being wheeled onto the stage via gurney dressed up as "The Patient", before singing the opening lines of the album's opening song "The End." From there, the song would fully begin and Gerard Way would formally introduce the band's "Black Parade" persona. The band would then play through The Black Parade in its entirety. After about sixty minutes of playing, the concert would reach the final song on the album, "Famous Last Words", where sparks would engulf the stage and the band would leave for a brief intermission.

After the intermission, My Chemical Romance would return to the stage, ditching the "Black Parade" persona in favor of attire reminiscent to their outfits from their Three Cheers for Sweet Revenge (2004) era; the backdrop of the stage would be replaced by simply the word "revenge" in all caps. From there, they would play a selection of their greatest hits from their previous studio albums, such as "I'm Not Okay (I Promise)", "The Ghost of You", and others. After playing through a selection of their previous songs for about thirty minutes, the band would then conclude the concert with "Helena".

== Reception and legacy ==
According to the Billboard Boxscore, the Black Parade World Tour earned $183,600 per show on average, with an average of 5,415 tickets sold per date. It was a more profitable tour than the band's next headlining tour, the World Contamination Tour, which averaged $136,000 in profit and 3,392 in tickets sold per show, a 27% decrease and a 37% decrease respectively. In 2024, My Chemical Romance announced a second tour centered around The Black Parade, called Long Live The Black Parade (2025–2026).

The performances of Gerard Way and the rest of the band during the tour were praised. Gary Graft of Billboard believed that the energy displayed by the band during the shows surpassed that present on the actual album. NME highlighted Way's banter and joking mannerisms towards the crowd, saying that Way "[gestured] like a sinister puppet master, clearly intoxicated with power", regardless of what role he was currently playing during the show. Neva Chonin of SFGate wrote that the performances of Way and the band were extremely appealing to teenagers, and that they could be compared to other popular rock acts such as Kiss and Queen. Thompson Ed of IGN compared Way's performance to Bob Geldof's in the 1982 film adaptation of Pink Floyd's The Wall and Freddie Mercury's vocal capabilities, and said it featured "over-the-top displays of disaffected extravagance". Scott McLennan of Telegram & Gazette deemed Way to be closer to a performer than a singer during the show.

Many commented on the production behind the tour. Chonin stated that the band had a "talent for theatrical excess", highlighting the several stage elements that were used during the songs, including the flame pots and sparks. NME believed that the theatrics combined with the band's performance "bolstered emo’s prime pin-up". Kelefa Sanneh of The New York Times said that the overall effect of the theatrics was impressive, although they believed that there were some "awkward moments", such as when it took time for blimps to abruptly inflate and deflate during songs. In 2021, David McLaughlin of Kerrang! said that the Black Parade World Tour was one of the ten best concert tours of all time, describing it as a "theatrical, all sensory masterclass" that demonstrated the creativity and commercial peak of My Chemical Romance.

== Standard set list ==
=== February 2007–October 7, 2007 ===
"The Black Parade"

1. "The End."
2. "Dead!"
3. "This Is How I Disappear"
4. "The Sharpest Lives"
5. "Welcome to the Black Parade"
6. "I Don't Love You"
7. "House of Wolves"
8. "Cancer"
9. "Mama"
10. "Sleep"
11. "Teenagers"
12. "Disenchanted"
13. "Famous Last Words"

My Chemical Romance / Encore

1. "I'm Not Okay (I Promise)"
2. "It’s Not a Fashion Statement, It’s a Fucking Deathwish"
3. "Cemetery Drive"
4. "The Ghost of You"
5. "Give 'Em Hell, Kid"
6. "Thank You for the Venom"
7. "You Know What They Do to Guys Like Us in Prison"
8. "Helena"

=== October 2007–May 2008 ===
Taken from the track list of The Black Parade Is Dead!.

1. "Welcome to the Black Parade"
2. "Thank You for the Venom"
3. "Dead!"
4. "The Sharpest Lives"
5. "This Is How I Disappear"
6. "Teenagers"
7. "I'm Not Okay (I Promise)"
8. "You Know What They Do To Guys Like Us In Prison"
9. "Famous Last Words"
10. "Give 'Em Hell, Kid"
11. "House of Wolves"
12. "It's Not A Fashion Statement, It's A Fucking Deathwish"
13. "I Don't Love You"
14. "Untitled"
15. "Mama"
16. "Helena"
17. "Cancer"

== Tour dates ==
Shows in 2007
Date (2007)	City	Country	Venue	Opening act(s)	Ref.
February 22	Manchester	United States	Verizon Wireless Arena	Rise Against	
February 23	Uniondale	United States	Nassau Coliseum	Rise Against	
February 24	Hartford	United States	New England Dodge Music Center	Rise Against	
February 25	Philadelphia	United States	Liacouras Center	Rise Against	
February 26	Cleveland	United States	Wolstein Center	Rise Against	
February 28	Detroit	United States	Joe Louis Arena	Rise Against	
March 1	Rosemont	United States	Allstate Arena	Rise Against	
March 2	Topeka	United States	Kansas Expocentre	Rise Against	
March 3	Lincoln	United States	Pershing Center	Rise Against	
March 4	Denver	United States	Magness Arena	Rise Against	
March 6	West Valley City	United States	E Center	Rise Against	
March 7	Las Vegas	United States	Orleans Arena	Rise Against	
March 9	Glendale	United States	Jobing.com Arena	Rise Against	
March 10	Inglewood	United States	The Forum	Rise Against	
March 11	Anaheim	United States	Anaheim Convention Center	Rise Against	
March 13	San Diego	United States	iPay One Center	Rise Against	
March 14	Fresno	United States	Selland Arena	Rise Against	
March 15	Oakland	United States	Oracle Arena	Rise Against	
March 16	Reno	United States	Lawlor Convention Center	Rise Against	
March 20	Plymouth	England	Plymouth Pavilions	—N/a	
March 21	Brighton	England	Brighton Centre	—N/a	
March 22	Birmingham	England	National Indoor Arena	—N/a	
March 24	Manchester	England	Manchester Evening News Arena	—N/a	
March 25	Cardiff	Wales	Cardiff International Arena	—N/a	
March 26	Nottingham	England	Nottingham Arena	—N/a	
March 27	Glasgow	Scotland	Scottish Exhibition and Conference Centre	—N/a	
March 29	London	England	Wembley Arena	—N/a	
April 1	Dublin	Ireland	Royal Dublin Society	—N/a	
April 3	Cologne	Germany	Palladium	—N/a	
April 4	Paris	France	Élysée Montmartre	—N/a	
April 6	Berlin	Germany	Columbiahalle	—N/a	
April 7	Hamburg	Germany	Alsterdorfer Sporthalle	—N/a	
April 9	Malmö	Sweden	Baltiska Hallen	—N/a	
April 10	Copenhagen	Denmark	K.B. Hallen	—N/a	
April 14	Houston	United States	Reliant Arena	Muse	
April 15	Frisco	United States	Pizza Hut Park	Muse	
April 16	San Antonio	United States	AT&T Center	Muse	
April 18	Pensacola	United States	Pensacola Civic Center	Muse	
April 19	Tampa	United States	St. Pete Times Forum	Muse	
April 22	Sunrise	United States	BankAtlantic Center	Muse	
April 24	Duluth	United States	Arena at Gwinnett Center	Muse	
April 25	Nashville	United States	Nashville Municipal Auditorium	Muse	
April 26	Charlotte	United States	Cricket Arena	Muse	
April 27	Columbia	United States	Merriweather Post Pavilion	Muse	
April 28	Williamsburg	United States	William & Mary Hall	Muse	
April 29	State College	United States	Bryce Jordan Center	Muse	
May 1	Columbus	United States	Nationwide Arena	Muse	
May 3	Glens Falls	United States	Glens Falls Civic Center	Muse	
May 5 (Note: This concert was a part of The Bamboozle)	East Rutherford	United States	Meadowlands Sports Complex	Muse	
May 6	Portland	United States	Cumberland County Civic Center	Muse	
May 8	Worcester	United States	DCU Center	Muse	
May 9	Montreal	Canada	Bell Centre	—N/a	
May 10	Ottawa	Canada	Scotiabank Place	—N/a	
May 11	Toronto	Canada	Air Canada Centre	—N/a	
May 12	London	Canada	John Labatt Centre	—N/a	
May 15	Winnipeg	Canada	MTS Centre	—N/a	
May 16	Saskatoon	Canada	Credit Union Centre	—N/a	
May 17	Edmonton	Canada	Rexall Place	—N/a	
May 18	Calgary	Canada	Pengrowth Saddledome	—N/a	
May 20	Vancouver	Canada	Virgin Festival	—N/a	
May 21	Seattle	United States	WaMu Theatre	—N/a	
May 22	Portland	United States	Veterans Memorial Coliseum	—N/a	
June 1	Nürburg	Germany	Rock am Ring	—N/a	
June 2	Nuremberg	Germany	Rock im Park	—N/a	
June 3	Prague	Czech Republic	T-Mobile Arena	—N/a	
June 5	Amsterdam	Netherlands	Heineken Music Hall	—N/a	
June 8	Castle Donington	England	Download Festival	—N/a	
June 11	Saint Petersburg	Russia	Ice Palace	—N/a	
June 13	Moscow	Russia	Luzhniki Palace of Sports	—N/a	
June 15	Venice	Italy	Heineken Jammin' Festival	—N/a	
June 16	Nickelsdorf	Austria	Nova Rock Festival	—N/a	
June 17	London	England	Wembley Stadium	—N/a	
June 19	Paris	France	Zénith de Paris	—N/a	
June 20	Bordeaux	France	Le Krakatoa	—N/a	
June 22	Bilbao	Spain	Bilbao BBK Live	—N/a	
June 23	Madrid	Spain	Metrorock	—N/a	
June 24	Lisbon	Portugal	Coliseu dos Recreios	—N/a	
June 26	Barcelona	Spain	Razzmatazz	—N/a	
June 28	Werchter	Belgium	Rock Werchter	—N/a	
June 30	Arendal	Norway	Hove Festival	—N/a	
July 1	Gothenburg	Sweden	Pier Pressure	—N/a	
July 3	Helsinki	Finland	Helsinki Ice Hall	—N/a	
July 4	Dresden	Germany	Ostragehege	—N/a	
July 6	Roskilde	Denmark	Roskilde Festival	—N/a	
July 7	Kinross	Scotland	T in the Park	—N/a	
July 8	County Kildare	Ireland	Oxegen	—N/a	
October 7	Mexico City	Mexico	Palacio de los Deportes	—N/a	
October 24	Hoboken	United States	Maxwell's	—N/a	
October 30	Bratislava	Slovakia	ŠH Pasienky	—N/a	
November 2	Vienna	Austria	Wiener Stadthalle	—N/a	
November 3	Milan	Italy	Palasharp	—N/a	
November 4	Zürich	Switzerland	Eulachhalle	—N/a	
November 6	Brussels	Belgium	Halles de Schaerbeek/Hallen van Schaarbeek	—N/a	
November 7	Luxembourg	Luxembourg	Den Atelier	—N/a	
November 8	Düsseldorf	Germany	Philipshalle	—N/a	
November 11	Newcastle	England	Metro Radio Arena	—N/a	
November 12	Aberdeen	Scotland	Aberdeen Exhibition and Conference Centre	—N/a	
November 13	Sheffield	England	Hallam FM Arena	—N/a	
November 15	London	England	The O2 Arena	—N/a	
November 17	Belfast	Northern Ireland	King's Hall	—N/a	
November 28	Brisbane	Australia	Brisbane Entertainment Centre	—N/a	
November 30	Sydney	Australia	Sydney Entertainment Centre	—N/a	
December 1	Melbourne	Australia	Rod Laver Arena	—N/a	
December 3	Adelaide	Australia	Adelaide Entertainment Centre	—N/a	
December 6	Auckland	New Zealand	Vector Arena	—N/a	
December 9	Kuala Lumpur	Malaysia	Stadium Merdeka	—N/a	
December 11	Singapore	Singapore	Singapore Expo	—N/a	
December 14	Honolulu	United States	Neal S. Blaisdell Center	—N/a	

Shows in 2008
Date (2008)	City	Country	Venue	Opening act(s)	Ref.
January 20	Ho Chi Minh City	Vietnam	Quân khu 7 Stadium	—N/a	
January 22	Seoul	South Korea	Olympic Hall	—N/a	
January 25	Taguig	Philippines	Fort Bonifacio Open Field-Taguig	—N/a	
January 27	Taipei	Taiwan	National Taiwan University Sports Center	—N/a	
January 29	Chek Lap Kok	Hong Kong	AsiaWorld–Expo	—N/a	
January 31	Jakarta	Indonesia	Jakarta Convention Center	—N/a	
February 15	Rio de Janeiro	Brazil	Vivo Rio	—N/a	
February 17	Curitiba	Brazil	Hellooch	—N/a	
February 18	São Paulo	Brazil	Via Funchal	—N/a	
February 19	São Paulo	Brazil	Via Funchal	—N/a	
February 22	Buenos Aires	Argentina	Estadio Ricardo Etcheverry	—N/a	
March 28	Tempe	United States	Tempe Beach Park Amphitheater	—N/a	
March 29	Tucson	United States	Rialto Theatre	—N/a	
March 30	Las Vegas	United States	The Joint	—N/a	
March 31	Las Vegas	United States	The Joint	—N/a	
April 2	San Jose	United States	San Jose Civic Auditorium	—N/a	
April 3	San Francisco	United States	The Warfield	—N/a	
April 4	San Francisco	United States	The Warfield	—N/a	
April 6	Irvine	United States	Bamboozle	—N/a	
April 8	Portland	United States	Crystal Ballroom	—N/a	
April 9	Portland	United States	Crystal Ballroom	—N/a	
April 11	Magna	United States	Saltair	—N/a	
April 12	Mexico City	Mexico	Zero Fest	—N/a	
April 14	Denver	United States	The Fillmore Auditorium	—N/a	
April 15	Kansas City	United States	Memorial Hall	—N/a	
April 17	Chicago	United States	Congress Theater	—N/a	
April 18	Chicago	United States	Congress Theater	—N/a	
April 19	Detroit	United States	The Fillmore Detroit	—N/a	
April 20	Detroit	United States	The Fillmore Detroit	—N/a	
April 22	Cleveland	United States	Agora Theatre	—N/a	
April 24	New Orleans	United States	House of Blues - New Orleans	—N/a	
April 25	Baton Rouge	United States	X-Fest @ Baton Rouge River Center	—N/a	
April 26	The Woodlands	United States	Cynthia Woods Mitchell Pavilion	—N/a	
April 27	Frisco	United States	Pizza Hut Park	—N/a	
April 28	Austin	United States	Stubbs Amphitheatre	—N/a	
April 30	Birmingham	United States	Sloss Furnaces	—N/a	
May 2	Memphis	United States	Beale St. Festival	—N/a	
May 3	St. Louis	United States	The Pageant	—N/a	
May 4	Columbus	United States	Lifestyle Communities Pavilion	—N/a	
May 6	Philadelphia	United States	Electric Factory	—N/a	
May 7	Philadelphia	United States	Electric Factory	—N/a	
May 9	New York City	United States	Madison Square Garden	—N/a	

=== Cancelled dates ===
List of cancelled dates
Date	City	Country	Venue	Reason	Ref.
May 2, 2007	Pittsburgh	United States	Petersen Events Center	Food poisoning and hospitalization of band members and crew	
May 4, 2007	Reading	United States	Sovereign Center	Food poisoning and hospitalization of band members and crew	
October 27, 2007	Orono, Maine	United States	Collins Center for the Arts	Bob Bryar's wrist was injured while performing with Bon Jovi the night prior.	
