= My Chemical Romance Reunion Tour =

2019–23 concert tour by My Chemical Romance

- Tour by My Chemical Romance
- Promotional poster
- Location: Asia; Europe; North America; Oceania
- Start date: May 16, 2022
- End date: March 26, 2023
- Legs: 4
- No. of shows: 72

My Chemical Romance concert chronology
- 10th Annual Honda Civic Tour (2011); Reunion Tour (2019–2023); Long Live The Black Parade (2025-2026)

The Reunion Tour was a concert tour by American rock band My Chemical Romance. After a single reunion show in Los Angeles on December 20, 2019, a worldwide tour set to commence in 2020 was postponed several times due to the COVID-19 pandemic. It commenced in May 2022, with legs in Europe, North America, and Oceania, before concluding in March 2023.

== History ==
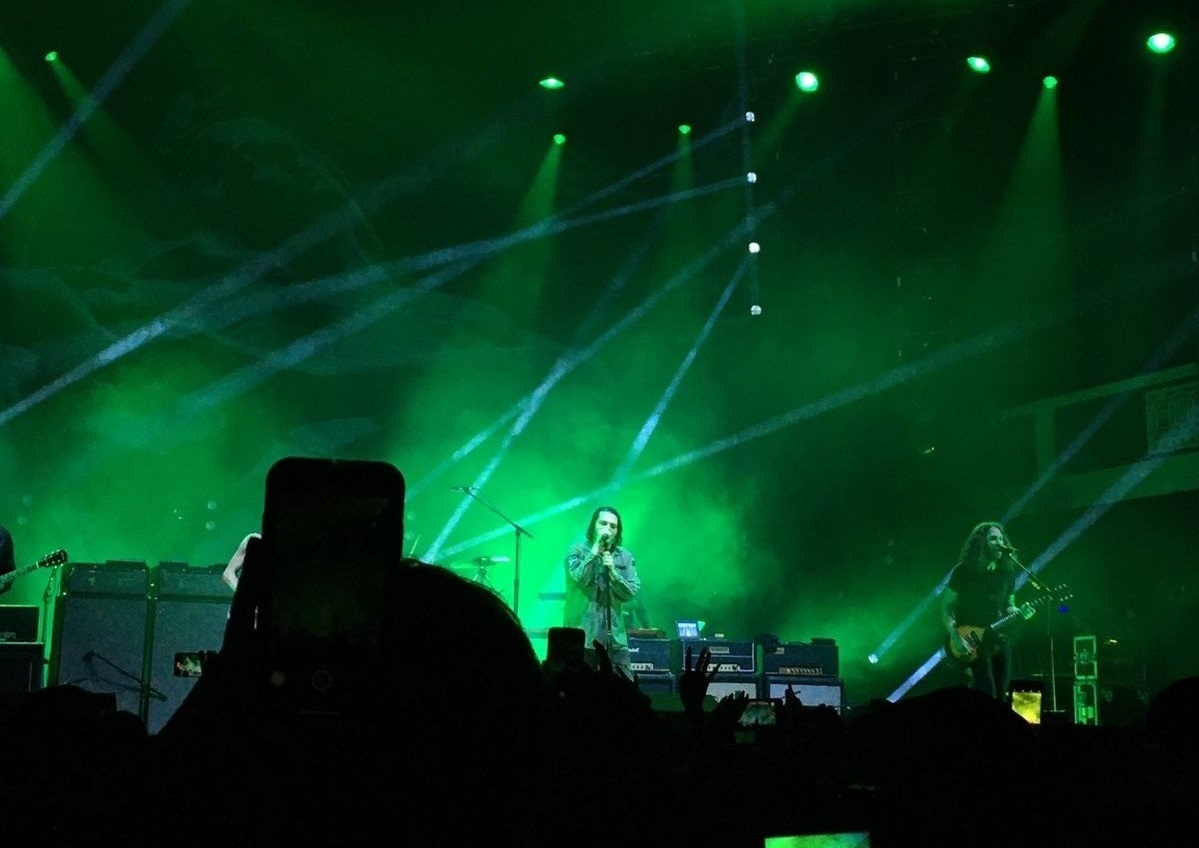
Gerard Way and Ray Toro playing at the Shrine Exposition Hall on December 20, 2019.

On October 31, 2019, after a six-year hiatus, the band announced a reunion scheduled to be held as a one-off event in Los Angeles on December 20, 2019. After tickets for the show sold out within minutes, and following a strong positive response to the news online, the band subsequently scheduled further reunion shows worldwide. Initial announcements centered on a run of summer festival shows in mainland Europe and three nights at Stadium MK in Milton Keynes, England, followed by a further announcement of a North American tour.

Due to the COVID-19 pandemic, all the tour's 2020 shows, including the North American leg, were postponed to 2021. On March 9, 2021, it was announced that the planned England performance in St Austell had been postponed. The band announced in April 2021 that all of the remaining tour dates had been rescheduled for 2022. An additional three tour dates in Australia were announced on May 23, 2021.

== Reception ==
The first date of the tour was sold out with an attendance of 5,113, garnering a total revenue of $1,451,745.

Angie Piccirillo, a reporter from Consequence of Sound gave the December 20, 2019 performance a positive review, stating: "emo is alive and well in 2019. If you don’t believe it, you should have seen My Chemical Romance reunite on Friday night for their first show in seven years. The legendary emo rock band ended the decade with a literal 'bang', a 'one-night only' gig at Los Angeles' Shrine Auditorium, where the scene smelled just like high school — except this time around, no one was under 21." Other reporters from NME, Rolling Stone and Kerrang! who attended the performance had given the show positive reviews as well.

== Set list ==
The following set list is from the Los Angeles show on December 20, 2019. It is not intended to represent all shows from the tour.

1. "I'm Not Okay (I Promise)"
2. "Thank You for the Venom"
3. "Give 'Em Hell, Kid"
4. "House of Wolves"
5. "Summertime"
6. "You Know What They Do to Guys Like Us in Prison"
7. "Make Room!!!!"
8. "Our Lady of Sorrows"
9. "Na Na Na (Na Na Na Na Na Na Na Na Na)"
10. "Sleep"
11. "Mama"
12. "I Don't Love You"
13. "Destroya"
14. "Teenagers"
15. "S/C/A/R/E/C/R/O/W"
16. "Famous Last Words"
17. "The Kids from Yesterday"
  Encore
18. "Vampire Money"
19. "Helena"
  Encore 2
20. "Welcome to the Black Parade"

== Tour dates ==
List of 2019 shows
Date	City	Country	Venue	Opening act(s)	Ref.
December 20	Los Angeles	United States	Shrine Exposition Hall	Thursday	

List of 2022 shows
Date	City	Country	Venue	Opening act(s)	Ref.
May 16	St. Austell	England	Eden Project	Frank Turner	
May 17	St. Austell	England	Eden Project	LostAlone	
May 19	Milton Keynes	England	Stadium MK	LostAlone; Placebo; Witch Fever	
May 21	Milton Keynes	England	Stadium MK	CassyetteBarns CourtneyPlacebo	
May 22	Milton Keynes	England	Stadium MK	Charlotte Sands; Starcrawler	
May 24	Dublin	Ireland	Royal Hospital Kilmainham	Gayle; Starcrawler	
May 25	Dublin	Ireland	Royal Hospital Kilmainham	Gayle	
May 27	Warrington	England	Victoria Park	Crawlers; Frank Turner; Starcrawler	
May 28	Cardiff	Wales	Sophia Gardens	Funeral for a Friend; LostAlone; Starcrawler	
May 30	Glasgow	Scotland	OVO Hydro	Starcrawler	
June 1	Paris	France	Accor Arena	Starcrawler	
June 2	Rotterdam	Netherlands	Rotterdam Ahoy	Starcrawler	
June 4 (Note: The show on June 4, 2022 at Arena Parco Nord was part of Sonic Park Fest.)	Bologna	Italy	Arena Parco Nord	—N/a	
June 6	Munich	Germany	Olympiahalle	Starcrawler	
June 7	Budapest	Hungary	Budapest Park	Barns Courtney	
June 9	Warsaw	Poland	Letnia Scena Progresji	Karin Ann; Barns Courtney	
June 11 (Note: The June 11, 2022 show at O2 Arena Prague was part of Prague Rocks.)	Prague	Czech Republic	O_{2} Arena	Manon Meurt; Eclipse	
June 12	Berlin	Germany	Velodrom	Creeper	
June 14	Stockholm	Sweden	Gröna Lund	—N/a	
June 17 (Note: The June 17 and 18, 2022 shows at Rheinaue are part of Kunst!rasen Festival.)	Bonn	Germany	Rheinaue	Creeper	
June 18	Bonn	Germany	Rheinaue	Creeper	
August 20	Oklahoma City	United States	Paycom Center	Coheed and Cambria; Dilly Dally	
August 21	San Antonio	United States	AT&T Center	Dilly Dally; Turnstile	
August 23	Nashville	United States	Bridgestone Arena	Dilly Dally; Turnstile	
August 24	Cincinnati	United States	Heritage Bank Center	Dilly Dally; Turnstile	
August 26	Raleigh	United States	PNC Arena	Soul Glo; Turnstile	
August 27	Elmont	United States	UBS Arena	The Bouncing Souls; Ghösh	
August 29	Philadelphia	United States	Wells Fargo Center	Devil Master	
August 30	Albany	United States	MVP Arena	Meg Myers; Waterparks	
September 1	Uncasville	United States	Mohegan Sun Arena	Meg Myers; Waterparks	
September 2	Montreal	Canada	Bell Centre	Meg Myers; Waterparks	
September 4	Toronto	Canada	Scotiabank Arena	Meg Myers; Waterparks	
September 5	Toronto	Canada	Scotiabank Arena	Meg Myers; Waterparks	
September 7	Boston	United States	TD Garden	Badflower; Thursday	
September 8	Boston	United States	TD Garden	Badflower; Thursday	
September 10	Brooklyn	United States	Barclays Center	Badflower; Thursday	
September 11	Brooklyn	United States	Barclays Center	The Lemon Twigs; Thursday	
September 13	Detroit	United States	Little Caesars Arena	The Lemon Twigs; Thursday	
September 15	Saint Paul	United States	Xcel Energy Center	The Homeless Gospel Choir; Thursday	
September 16 (Note: The September 16, 2022 show at Douglass Park was part of Riot Fest.)	Chicago	United States	Douglass Park	—N/a	
September 18 (Note: The September 18, 2022 show in Alpharetta was a replacement show for the now-cancelled Music Midtown in Atlanta.)	Alpharetta	United States	Ameris Bank Amphitheatre	100 gecs	
September 20	Newark	United States	Prudential Center	The Homeless Gospel Choir; Thursday	
September 21	Newark	United States	Prudential Center	The Homeless Gospel Choir; Midtown	
September 23 (Note: The September 23, 2022 show at The Woodlands is part of Firefly Music Festival.)	Dover	United States	The Woodlands	—N/a	
September 24	Sunrise	United States	FLA Live Arena	The Homeless Gospel Choir; Midtown	
September 27	Houston	United States	Toyota Center	Devil Master; Midtown	
September 28	Dallas	United States	American Airlines Center	Devil Master; Midtown	
September 30	Denver	United States	Ball Arena	Taking Back Sunday; Youth Code	
October 2	Portland	United States	Moda Center	Taking Back Sunday; Youth Code	
October 3	Tacoma	United States	Tacoma Dome	Kimya Dawson; Taking Back Sunday	
October 5	Oakland	United States	Oakland Arena	Surfbort; Taking Back Sunday	
October 7	Paradise	United States	T-Mobile Arena	Taking Back Sunday; Youth Code	
October 8 (Note: The October 8, 2022 show at Discovery Park was part of Aftershock Festival.)	Sacramento	United States	Discovery Park	—N/a	
October 11	Inglewood	United States	Kia Forum	Taking Back Sunday; Youth Code	
October 12	Inglewood	United States	Kia Forum	The Regrettes; Shannon and the Clams	
October 14	Inglewood	United States	Kia Forum	Meg Myers; Nothing	
October 15	Inglewood	United States	Kia Forum	The Homeless Gospel Choir; Thursday	
October 17	Inglewood	United States	Kia Forum	Midtown; Waterparks	
October 23 (Note: The October 23, and 29, 2022 shows at the Las Vegas Festival Grounds were part of When We Were Young.)	Winchester	United States	Las Vegas Festival Grounds	—N/a	
October 29	Winchester	United States	Las Vegas Festival Grounds	—N/a	
November 18 (Note: The concert on November 18, 2022 was part of Corona Capital.)	Mexico City	Mexico	Autódromo Hermanos Rodríguez	White Lies	

List of 2023 shows
Date	City	Country	Venue	Opening act(s)	Ref.
March 11	Auckland	New Zealand	The Outer Fields	Lips; Miss June; Goodnight Nurse	
March 13	Brisbane	Australia	Brisbane Entertainment Centre	Jimmy Eat World	
March 14	Brisbane	Australia	Brisbane Entertainment Centre	Jimmy Eat World	
March 16	Melbourne	Australia	Rod Laver Arena	Jimmy Eat World	
March 17	Melbourne	Australia	Rod Laver Arena	Jimmy Eat World	
March 19	Sydney	Australia	Qudos Bank Arena	Jimmy Eat World	
March 20	Sydney	Australia	Qudos Bank Arena	Jimmy Eat World	
March 25 (Note: The March 25 and 26, 2023 shows in Japan were part of the Punkspring festival.)	Chiba	Japan	Makuhari Messe	—N/a	
March 26	Osaka	Japan	Intex Osaka	—N/a	

=== Cancelled dates ===
Date	City	Country	Venue	Reason	Ref.
March 20, 2020 (Note: The concerts scheduled for March 20 and 21, 2020 in Australia would have been part of Download Festival Australia.)	Ascot Vale	Australia	Melbourne Showgrounds	COVID-19 pandemic	
March 21, 2020	Sydney	Australia	The Domain	COVID-19 pandemic	
March 25, 2020	Auckland	New Zealand	The Outer Fields	COVID-19 pandemic	
July 1, 2020	Sopron	Hungary	Volt Festival	COVID-19 pandemic	
June 16, 2022	Saint Petersburg	Russia	Ice Palace	Russian invasion of Ukraine	
June 17, 2022 (Note: The June 17, 2022 show in Moscow would have been part of Park Live Festival.)	Moscow	Russia	Luzhniki Olympic Complex	Russian invasion of Ukraine	
June 19, 2022 (Note: The June 19, 2022 show in Kyiv would have been part of UPark Festival.)	Kyiv	Ukraine	Sky Family Park	Russian invasion of Ukraine	
September 18, 2022 (Note: The September 18, 2022 show in Atlanta would have been part of the Music Midtown Festival.)	Atlanta	United States	Piedmont Park	Gun laws in Georgia	
October 22, 2022 (Note: The October 22, 2022 show in Winchester would have been part of When We Were Young.)	Winchester	United States	Las Vegas Festival Grounds	High wind warning	

== Personnel ==
My Chemical Romance

- Frank Iero – rhythm guitar, backing vocals
- Ray Toro – lead guitar, backing vocals
- Gerard Way – lead vocals
- Mikey Way – bass

Additional personnel

- Jarrod Alexander – drums, percussion
- Jamie Muhoberac – keyboards
