= Welcome to the Black Parade =

2006 single by My Chemical Romance

Single by My Chemical Romance

from the album The Black Parade
- B-side: "Heaven Help Us"
- Released: September 12, 2006
- Studio: El Dorado (Burbank); Capitol (Hollywood) (Note: Strings and horns)
- Genre: Emo; pop-punk
- Length: 5:11 (album version); 4:37 (radio edit)
- Label: Reprise
- Songwriters: Bob Bryar; Frank Iero; Ray Toro; Gerard Way; Mikey Way
- Producers: Rob Cavallo; My Chemical Romance

My Chemical Romance singles chronology
"The Ghost of You" (2005)	"Welcome to the Black Parade" (2006)	"Famous Last Words" (2007)

Music video
- "Welcome to the Black Parade" on YouTube "Welcome to the Black Parade (Outtake Version) on YouTube

"Welcome to the Black Parade" is a song by the American rock band My Chemical Romance from their third studio album The Black Parade (2006). It was released as the album's lead single on September 12, 2006. A mainly emo and pop-punk song, it opens up with a piano introduction that evolves into a fusion of several other rock-esque genres throughout its run time. The lyrics are based around the album's central character, the Patient, as he recalls a childhood memory before his death. According to band frontman Gerard Way, the broader theme of the song is the "triumph of the human spirit".

Development of the song began during the band's earliest recording sessions after they were formed under the title "The Five of Us Are Dying". The band attempted many times to work on the song over the course of several years, but struggled to create a final product that they were satisfied with. The band was finally motivated to finish it after they attached to its beginning a piano line previously created by the producer Rob Cavallo. Samuel Bayer directed the accompanying music video, which depicts the band in their "Black Parade" alter-ego as they guide the Patient towards the afterlife.

"Welcome to the Black Parade" was a critical and commercial success, often being considered one of their best songs, if not their best, as well as their signature song. It became their only number one on the UK singles chart, their most successful song on the Billboard Hot 100, and charted in other regions such as Venezuela and multiple European countries. It has several platinum certifications from the Recording Industry Association of America, British Phonographic Industry, Music Canada, and Recorded Music NZ. Music journalists have often considered "Welcome to the Black Parade" to be an "emo anthem"; the Rock and Roll Hall of Fame has listed it as a song that "shaped rock and roll". It has been covered by many other artists and is a staple of My Chemical Romance's live shows.

== Background and production ==
My Chemical Romance began work on their third studio album, The Black Parade, in early 2006 at S.I.R. Studios in New York, with the band's frontman Gerard Way aiming to create an album centered around life and death. He eventually came up with idea of a concept album centered around a man dying of cancer, known as Patient, as he nears the end of his life. Death then presents itself to the Patient in the form of his fondest childhood memory: his father taking him to see a marching band when he was a child.

During the production of the album, the band worked on "Welcome to the Black Parade", which was originally conceived shortly after they were formed in 2001. The working title of the song at the time was "The Five of Us Are Dying". The song was one that the band struggled to complete, reworking it several times throughout the course of its production. Gerard stated that the song was by far the hardest one to complete for The Black Parade, and that "pressure was tearing us up" when working on it. Additionally, during the production of the song, he was recovering from a break-up with his girlfriend of six years; Way further described the angst going through him when making the song as a "plea for help". He later stated in a 2021 interview that the song was almost cut from The Black Parade, due to him believing that earlier versions of the song didn't have as strong of themes as the rest of the album's tracks. Despite his discontent, he continued to try and work on the song, believing that it was necessary for the album to have a song that represented what the album stood for.

While still struggling to complete the song, the band decided to adopt an idea that the album's producer Rob Cavallo initially had for the album's introduction: a track that would depict a marching band going through a city, complete with crowd cheering and various instrumentals before it passes by the listener and fades away. The band decided to add the instrumental portion of the planned opener to "Welcome to the Black Parade". After Cavallo expressed approval with the addition of the piano, saying that it was the "best thing [he had] ever heard", the band finally worked towards completing the song. The final song was recorded and produced at Eldorado Recording Studios.

== Music and lyrics ==
"Welcome to the Black Parade"
Two 15-second excerpts from the song. The first is of the piano intro to the song, with its distinctive starting note of G5; the other is of the song's chorus, with a more rock-oriented sound.

"Welcome to the Black Parade" is an emo and pop-punk song that is five minutes and eleven seconds long; the radio edit is four minutes and thirty-seven seconds long. It has also been described as punk rock and hard rock. It is played in the key of G major, later changing to key of A major toward the end. Gerard Way's vocals range from the key of G4 to D6. The song starts off at 75 beats per minute, though the tempo later changes to 194 in half-time.

The song opens up with an 11 note long piano introduction that starts with a G5 note, which slowly builds up into a marching band-esque portion. Drumming and a guitar lead are then introduced in the second half, diving into a "frantic pop-punk burst of energy". The song combines the aspects of several areas of rock music. One portion of the song predominantly uses a horn. Several journalists compared the song to Queen's "Bohemian Rhapsody", and Billboard compared it to "In the Flesh" by Pink Floyd. Christopher R. Weingarten and Aliza Aufrichtig of the New York Times compared it to "It's the Hard Knock Life" from Annie and "Jesus of Suburbia" from American Idiot.

The song itself is about the idea of overcoming the darkness present within the world, as well as the "triumph of the human spirit" according to Way. The lyrics in the first part of the song are oriented around the Patient recalling his fondest childhood memory before his death. He further recollects his father asking him if he would be "the savior of the broken, the beaten, and the damned" during a bonding experience. The main chorus featured in the latter half of the song has Way shout out "we'll carry on". David Fricke of Rolling Stone described Way's shouting of "we'll carry on" as featuring "rock-hero tilt".

== Release ==
"Welcome to the Black Parade" was first played live on television on August 31, 2006, when the band performed it live at the 2006 MTV Video Music Awards. It was made available on the band's Myspace page two days later, before being officially released as a radio single on September 12. According to Craig Aaronson, the decision to release "Welcome to the Black Parade" as the album's lead single was initially contested by a few people working for the record label, who instead wanted "Famous Last Words" or "Teenagers" to be released, although the majority of people agreed to release "Welcome to the Black Parade" first. CD singles were released later in October; B-sides for the physical releases included a live recording of the song, as well as another song, "Heaven Help Us". The Black Parade was released on October 23 through Reprise Records; "Welcome to the Black Parade" is the fifth song on the track list.

A live recording of the song is featured on The Black Parade is Dead!, which includes the final show performed on The Black Parade World Tour, released in 2008. It was later featured on the track list for the band's greatest hits album, May Death Never Stop You, released in 2014. The song was also released as part of The Black Parade/Living with Ghosts, the 10th-anniversary reissue of The Black Parade, on September 23, 2016. The reissue also includes a demo of the track entitled "The Five of Us Are Dying"; the demo was shared prior to the release of the reissue.

== Critical reception ==
In their initial review of the single in 2006, Cody Jefferson of Drowned in Sound gave "Welcome to the Black Parade" a 9 out of 10 score, describing it as the most attention-grabbing lead single since "Paranoid Android" from Radiohead's OK Computer, and the best number one single of the year since "Crazy" by Gnarls Barkley. He further stated that the song as loud, brash, tuneful, and fun, further comparing it to the work of other bands like Queen and Led Zeppelin. However, he also described the song as "disposable". Billboard described the song as the equivalent of "We Are the Champions" for high-school misfits, highlighting the lyricism and deeming it as "heavy stuff". Pitchfork's Ryan Dombal gave the single three out of five stars, with praise towards its ambition and sound but criticism towards its "clunky cohesion".

Upon release of The Black Parade, several reviewers highlighted "Welcome to the Black Parade" as one of the better songs on the album. NME said that the song was "where The Black Parade's genius reveals itself" and influenced the themes of the rest of the album, while a reviewer of Sputnikmusic felt that every song up to that point in the album was building up to "Welcome to the Black Parade". Fricke described the song as a "shot of light" that could appeal to listeners of all ages. In a more critical review of The Black Parade, Jaimie Hodgson of The Observer specifically highlighted "Welcome to the Black Parade" as the "final nail in the coffin". Several publications ranked "Welcome to the Black Parade" as one of the best songs released in 2006. Time ranked it as the 3rd best song of the year, Rolling Stone ranked it 17th, and BBC Music ranked it 43rd. At the 2007 Kerrang! Awards, the song was nominated for Best Single, but lost to "The Kill" by Thirty Seconds to Mars.

Retrospective rankings of the band's discography by music journalists have consistently labeled "Welcome to the Black Parade" as one of the band's best songs, if not the best. Cassie Whitt and Jake Richardson of Loudwire, the staff team of Billboard, Marianne Eloise of Louder, and Margaret Farrell of Stereogum all placed it as the best song in the band's discography, while Sam Law of Kerrang! and Andy Belt of PopMatters both placed it at third in their rankings. Em Moore of Exclaim! placed it at sixth. In a 2021 readers poll conducted by Metal Hammer with over 50,000 voters, "Welcome to the Black Parade" was voted as the band's best song. Whitt and Richardson wrote that the song was the "obvious choice" for the band's best song, as a "stratospheric coming together of pomp, punk and devastating emotion". Eloise described the song as traversing between several genres and moods to create a song that felt longer and more grand than it actually was, while Billboard said that the song's commercial success was proof that "everyone can be a little emo", highlighting the "chant-along" vocals and its usage of the piano, describing the latter as "[cutting] like a knife". Belt described it as the best song on The Black Parade, as well as the peak of My Chemical Romance's career up to that point. In 2012, Loudwire ranked "Welcome to the Black Parade" as the 37th best hard rock song of the 21st century. In 2025, Rolling Stone ranked it as the 96th best song of the 21st century up to that point.

== Commercial performance ==
In the United States, "Welcome to the Black Parade" reached number 9 on the Billboard Hot 100 and remains their best-performing song on that chart. It also reached number 1 on the Modern Rock Tracks chart, number 11 on the Mainstream Top 40, number 22 on the Adult Top 40, and number 24 on the Mainstream Rock Tracks chart. It has been certified 7× Platinum by the Recording Industry Association of America, representing over 7,000,000 confirmed unit sales. In the United Kingdom, it reached number 1 on the UK singles chart and remains their only song to reach that position. It also reached number 1 on the UK Rock & Metal chart, and has been certified 3× Platinum by the British Phonographic Industry with over 1,800,000 confirmed units. It also reached number 5 on the European Hot 100 Singles chart.

In Canada, it reached number 32 on Canadian Hot 100 and has been certified 6× Platinum by Music Canada. In New Zealand, the song reached number 2 and has been certified 3× Platinum by Recorded Music NZ. Elsewhere, the song reached number 1 on the Venezuela Pop Rock chart, number 2 in Croatia and New Zealand, number 6 in the Czech Republic, number 7 in the Czech Republic, number 12 in Ireland, number 14 in Australia, number 15 in Norway, number 18 in Denmark, number 26 in Sweden, and number 28 in Italy. It also reached number 58 in Germany and number 64 in Switzerland. The song has also been certified gold by the International Federation of the Phonographic Industry in Denmark and the Recording Industry Association of Japan as a ringtone.

== Music video ==
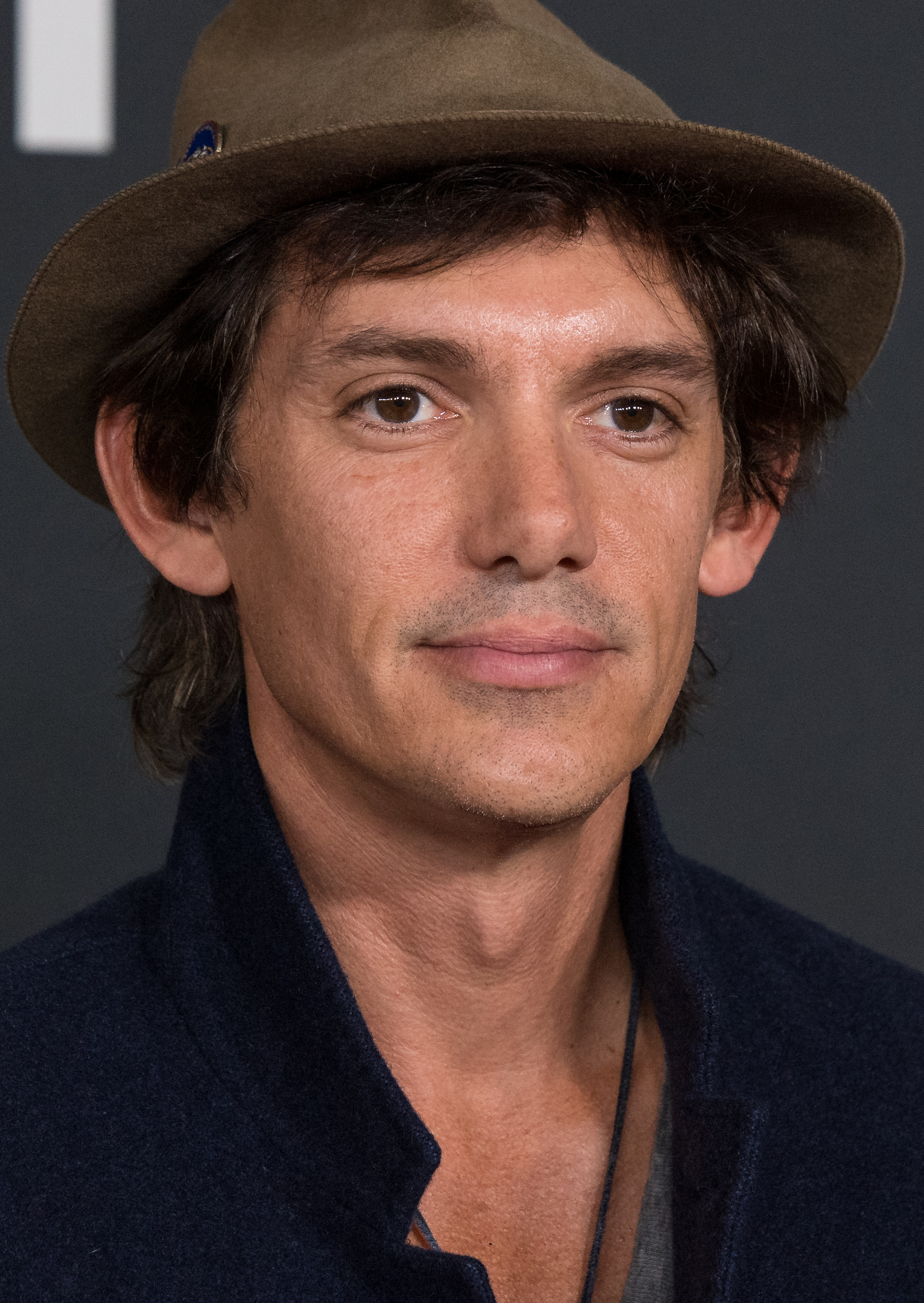
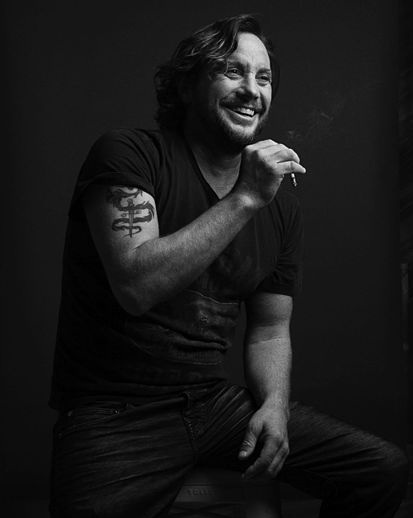
The main character of the music video, the Patient, was played by Lukas Haas (left). The video was directed by Samuel Bayer (right).

The music video for "Welcome to the Black Parade" was directed by Samuel Bayer. Development of the music video began when Way explained the premise behind the album and his vision of death appearing to someone in the form of their fondest memory to Bayer. Taking interest in the concept, Bayer rented a space shuttle hangar outside Downey, California and began construction of marching band floats and a city backdrop. Meanwhile, the band's Black Parade uniforms were designed by Colleen Atwood.

Filming for the music video took place from August 3–4, 2006. Since the filming and production of the music video required a lot of effort and money, the record label insisted that the band and Bayer record another music video in the same shoot as "Welcome to the Black Parade" to get more out of the sessions. As a result, the music video for "Famous Last Words" was recorded immediately after filming for "Welcome to the Black Parade" concluded, with the "Famous Last Words" clip serving as a continuation of the other's premise.

The clip follows the Patient (played by Lukas Haas) as he nears the end of his life and is approached by the Black Parade, who proceed to guide the Patient towards the afterlife in a dystopian city. The band themselves plays on top of a flat-bed truck, while blimps follow and several people in similar attire march alongside them. Alongside the band, several characters from the story of The Black Parade make appearances in the music video, specifically Mother War, Fear, and Regret.

The music video was a hit on Total Request Live. In 2017, Alternative Press ranked it as the band's best music video. That same year, the clip ranked first place on a MTV viewers poll for the greatest music video released during the 21st century, leading the network to grant it the award for the "Greatest Video of the Century". Mike Rampton of Kerrang! said that it could be considered the greatest music video ever made, writing that it was a "massive, high-budget, high-concept motherfucker of a video, with everyone going for it like there's no tomorrow".

== Live performances and legacy ==
"Welcome to the Black Parade" is among the commonly-played songs at My Chemical Romance's live shows, being featured on the set lists for several of their concert tours. It was played during the Black Parade World Tour, the 2007 Projekt Revolution tour, the World Contamination Tour, the 10th Annual Honda Civic Tour, and their reunion tour; the song was used as the closer of their initial reunion show on December 20, 2019. It was also performed at the Reading and Leeds Festivals in 2011, the 2022 Riot Fest, and at the When We Were Young festival in 2024; the band's performance there also featured a new reprise version of "Welcome to the Black Parade" played after "Famous Last Words". It was played during their Long Live The Black Parade Tour in 2025-26.

"Welcome to the Black Parade" has often been considered an "emo anthem". Farrell stated that the song was one of the best written in the 21st century. Terry Bezer of Louder described it as the "anthem of a generation", and Kerrang! stated that the song was one of the best and most important rock songs released during the 21st century, and a "rallying cry" for people that felt the world "dealt them a cruel hand". Whitt wrote that the song "defined a generation, defined a culture and, more than anything else, defined this band." Chloe Spinks of Gigwise described the song as perfect, saying that it showcased the true creativity behind the band's work. The song has been considered to be the band's signature song, and Bezer called it their magnum opus. It has also been listed by the Rock and Roll Hall of Fame as a song that "shaped rock and roll".

Some have considered the song to be recognizable through just the opening G5 note, with Andrew Lloyd Webber stating that "it's one thing to create an iconic set of chords, it's another to make one note iconic". Several covers of "Welcome to the Black Parade" have also been made by other artists, including the Blue Man Group, Kelly Clarkson, Xdinary Heroes, Phoebe Bridgers and Sloppy Jane, and Alex Lahey. In 2025, Jack Black performed a parody of "Welcome to the Black Parade" on Saturday Night Live as part of a song called "Goth Kid on Vacation".

=== Steve Aoki remix ===
To celebrate the tenth anniversary of The Black Parade, American DJ Steve Aoki collaborated with Way to create a remixed version of "Welcome to the Black Parade", which was released onto streaming platforms on November 28, 2016. The remix was described as a "jarring electro anthem" by Billboard, and incorporates synthesizers, trap music production, and sound effects of crowds cheering. Way's vocals were also made more clear for the remix. NME described it as an "intense dance rework". In an interview with BuzzFeed, Way described Aoki's remix as keeping the original essence of the song, while also turning it into something new based on Aoki's own interpretation of the song.

== Personnel ==
Credits adapted from the digital liner notes.

Musicians

- Gerard Way – vocals, songwriter, producer
- Frank Iero – guitar, backing vocals, songwriter, producer
- Michael James Way – bass, songwriter, producer
- Raymond Toro – guitar, songwriter, producer
- Bob Bryar – drums, percussion, songwriter, producer
- Cheech Iero – additional percussion
- Jamie Muhoberac – synthesizer, Hammond organ

Technicals

- Rob Cavallo – producer, piano
- Doug McKean – engineer
- David Campbell – string arranger, horn arranger
- Keith Armstrong – assistant engineer
- Jon Herroon – assistant engineer
- Jimmy Hoyson – assistant engineer (Capitol)
- Chris Steffen – assistant engineer (El Dorado)
- Lars Fox – editing engineer
- Ted Jenson – mastering engineer
- Chris Lord-Alge – mixing engineer

== Charts ==
=== Weekly charts ===
2006–2007 weekly chart performance for "Welcome to the Black Parade"
Chart (2006–2007)	Peak position
Australia (ARIA)	14
Belgium (Ultratop 50 Flanders)	50
Canada Hot 100 (Billboard)	32
Canada CHR/Top 40 (Billboard)	10
Canada Hot AC (Billboard)	28
Canada Rock (Billboard)	2
Croatia (HRT)	2
Czech Republic Airplay (ČNS IFPI)	6
Denmark (Tracklisten)	18
Europe (European Hot 100 Singles)	5
Finland (Suomen virallinen lista)	7
Finland Airplay (Radiosoittolista)	13
Germany (GfK)	58
Ireland (IRMA)	12
Italy (FIMI)	28
Netherlands (Single Top 100)	92
New Zealand (Recorded Music NZ)	2
Norway (VG-lista)	15
Scottish Singles Sales (Official Charts)	1
Slovakia Airplay (ČNS IFPI)	76
Sweden (Sverigetopplistan)	26
Switzerland (Schweizer Hitparade)	64
Switzerland Airplay (Swiss Hitparade)	76
UK Singles (Official Charts)	1
UK Airplay (Music Week)	18
UK Rock & Metal (Official Charts)	1
US Billboard Hot 100	9
US Adult Pop Airplay (Billboard)	22
US Alternative Airplay (Billboard)	1
US Mainstream Rock Airplay (Billboard)	24
US Pop Airplay (Billboard)	11
Venezuela Pop Rock (Record Report)	1

2019 weekly chart performance for "Welcome to the Black Parade"
Chart (2019)	Peak position
US Hot Rock & Alternative Songs (Billboard)	6

2025 weekly chart performance for "Welcome to the Black Parade"
Chart (2025)	Peak position
Malaysia (Billboard)	24
Malaysia International (RIM)	17

=== Year-end charts ===
2006 year-end chart performance for "Welcome to the Black Parade"
Chart (2006)	Position
Australia (ARIA)	71
Europe (European Hot 100 Singles)	97
UK Singles (OCC)	26

2007 year-end chart performance for "Welcome to the Black Parade"
Chart (2007)	Position
Australia (ARIA)	85
US Billboard Hot 100	59
US Modern Rock Tracks (Billboard)	18

== Certifications ==
Certifications and sales for "Welcome to the Black Parade"
Region	Certification	Certified units/sales
Austria (IFPI Austria)	Gold	15,000^{*}
Canada (Music Canada)	6× Platinum	480,000^{‡}
Denmark (IFPI Danmark)	Gold	4,000^{^}
Japan (RIAJ) Full-length ringtone	Gold	100,000^{*}
New Zealand (RMNZ)	3× Platinum	90,000^{‡}
United Kingdom (BPI)	3× Platinum	1,800,000^{‡}
United States (RIAA)	7× Platinum	7,000,000^{‡}
^{*} Sales figures based on certification alone.^{^} Shipments figures based on certification alone.^{‡} Sales+streaming figures based on certification alone.

== Release history ==
Release dates and formats for "Welcome to the Black Parade"
Region	Date	Format	Label	Ref.
Various	September 2, 2006	Digital download	Reprise	
United States	September 12, 2006	Radio airplay	Reprise	
United Kingdom	October 9, 2006	7" vinyl	Reprise	
Europe	October 9, 2006	CD single	Reprise	
