= Guitar tech =

Person who maintains guitars and related equipment

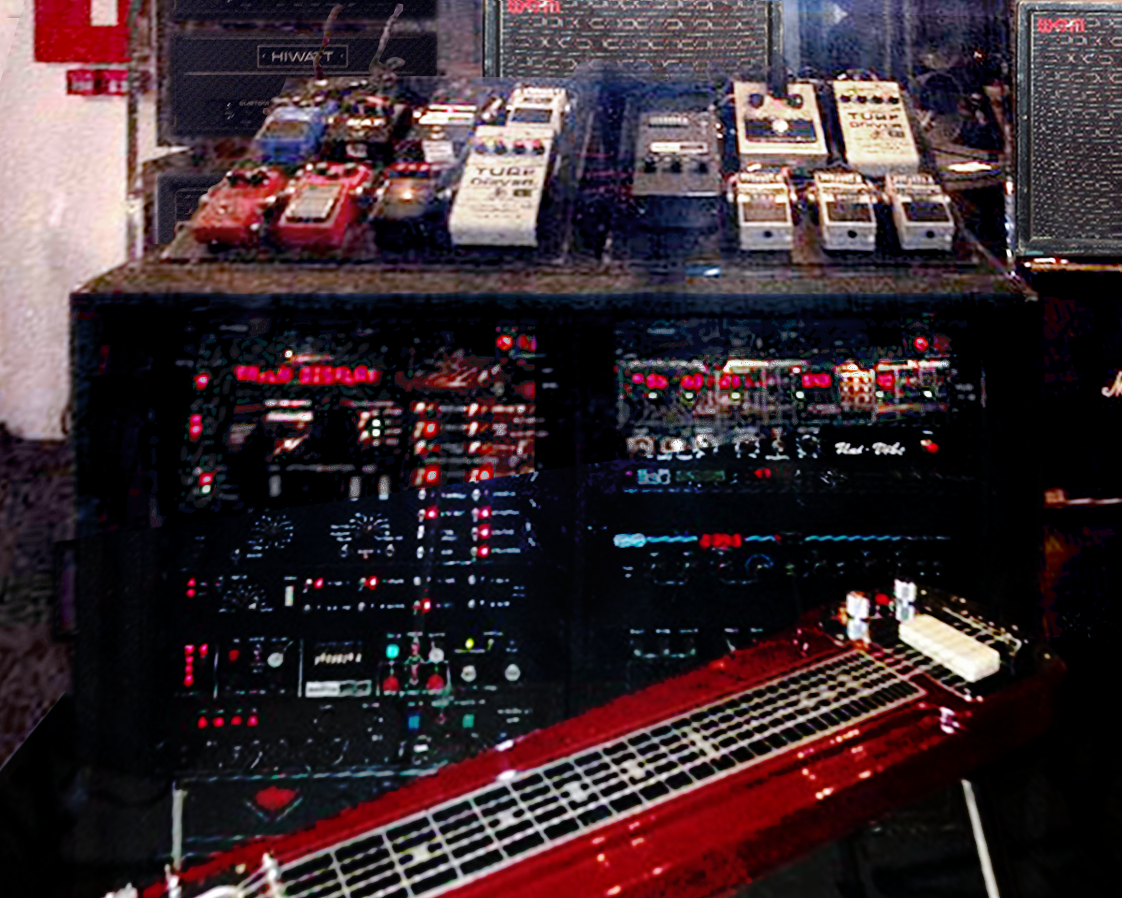
The guitar effects rack of Pink Floyd's David Gilmour

A guitar technician (or guitar tech) is a member of a music ensemble's road crew who maintains and sets up the musical equipment for one or more guitarists. Depending on the type and size of band, the guitar tech may be responsible for stringing, tuning, and adjusting electric guitars and acoustic guitars, and maintaining and setting up guitar amplifiers and other related electronic equipment such as effect pedals.

Once the guitar equipment has been set up onstage, the guitar tech does a soundcheck to ensure that the equipment is working well. If there are any problems, the guitar tech replaces or repairs the faulty components or equipment. Since guitar techs need to soundcheck the instruments and amplifiers, they must have basic guitar-playing skills, a musical "ear" for tuning, and familiarity with the way guitars, amplifiers, and effect pedals are supposed to sound in the style of music of their band.

Guitar techs learn their craft either "on the job", by working in a range of music, sound engineering, and instrument repair jobs; by completing a guitar repair program at a college or lutherie school; or from a combination of these two routes. The salaries and conditions of work for guitar techs vary widely, depending on whether a guitar tech is working for a minor or regional touring bar band or a major international touring act.

== Duties ==
=== Setting up and soundchecking ===
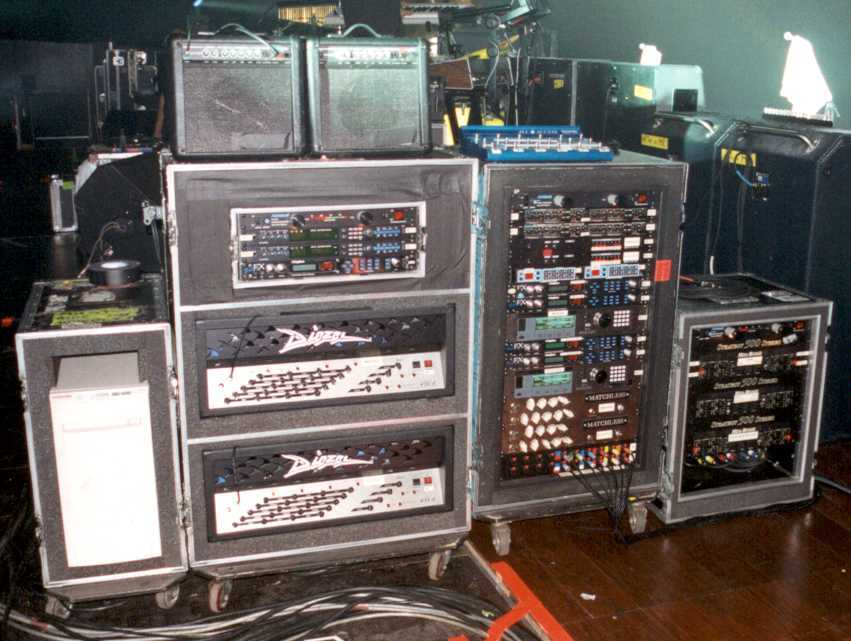
Photo of Billy Corgan's guitar rig taken by his guitar tech during one of the Smashing Pumpkins' live shows.

The duties of a guitar technician depend on the type of band they are working for, and on a range of other factors such as the size and nature of the stage show and the length of the show. Guitar technicians who work for an acoustic band, such as a folk group or bluegrass ensemble may be responsible for setting up and stringing, and tuning a range of stringed, fretted instruments including acoustic guitars, dobros, and mandolins. A guitar tech for a heavy metal band, on the other hand, may focus mainly on electric guitars, guitar amplifiers, and effects pedals. A guitar tech may change the sequence of effects pedals or alter the settings on effects pedals during the show, to assist the guitarist in creating different tone colours or sounds. For example, a guitarist may ask the guitar tech to connect a chorus effect and reverb before a guitar solo. In an indie rock band, a guitar technician would likely configure the equipment to evoke through tone a modern yet historically evocative sound. In an acid rock band, a guitar tech might have to manipulate the controls on a ring modulator or a rotating Leslie speaker cabinet to create unusual sounds while the guitarist is performing.

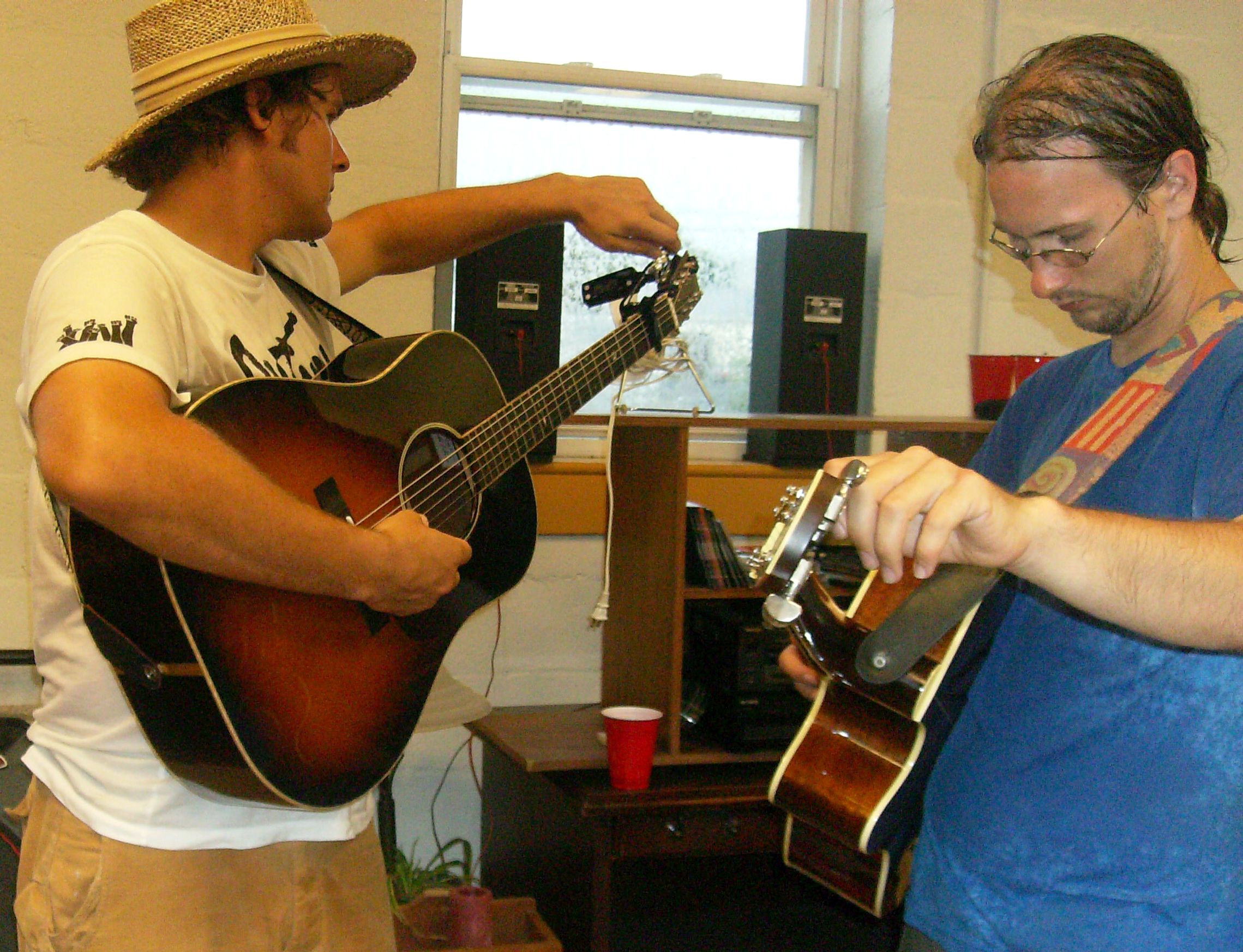
Acoustic guitars being tuned up backstage before a concert.

Once the guitars have been tuned with an electronic tuner and strummed to ensure that they are in tune, the guitar tech usually sets up the different guitars on guitar racks, ensures that the leather or nylon straps are properly connected, and that the patch cords are plugged in properly. During the show, the guitar tech hands instruments to the guitarist or guitarists according to the types of guitar that are required in the songs that they are playing. For example, a hard rock guitarist may use a "flying-V" guitar for a fast song, and then switch to an acoustic 12-string guitar for a soft ballad. The guitar tech retunes all of the instruments before they are used, because even if an instrument was perfectly in tune during the soundcheck, the heat from stage lights and the humidity from the stage conditions may render the instrument slightly out of tune.

After each guitar is used, the guitar tech cleans the strings with a cloth and replaces the instrument on a rack. During the show, the tech stands ready to replace any guitars in case a string breaks or if there is an equipment malfunction. The guitar tech may hand fresh towels to the guitarist so that the guitarist can remove sweat from the hands and ensure that the guitarist has ready access to beverages of their choice. If a guitar technician is working for a guitarist who uses picks, the guitar tech may lay out a variety of picks on a guitar amplifier or tape the picks to the mic stands with double-sided tape, so that they are within easy reach. At the end of the show, the guitar tech disconnects all of the patch cords, cleans the instruments and puts them back into their cases.

=== Maintenance and repair ===
The guitar tech also might perform any of a variety of maintenance tasks, such as checking that the string height of the guitars is set properly, modifying ("dressing") the height and arc of the frets, adjusting the intonation of the instruments, checking that tubes (valves) on tube amplifiers are working properly, and that cables are in good condition and free from crackles and hum caused by nicks and abrasions in the shielding or cable insulation. Techs also check the batteries on "outboard" devices — effects boxes, tuners, and pre-amps — and wireless transmitters, and change them as necessary. Depending on the size of a band's road crew, the guitar tech may either do this maintenance him- or herself, or, in a large touring act, delegate tasks to more-junior personnel.

The guitar tech does a basic soundcheck with the different guitars, amplifiers, and effects, to ensure that the equipment is functioning properly and that all of the connections between the equipment (which are made with patch cords) are plugged in correctly. This may be as simple as plugging an electric guitar into an amplifier or plugging an acoustic guitar into a DI box and preamp/equalizer. On the other hand, a tech may have to set up ten or more electric guitars, a variety of amplifiers, and connect them to an intricate sequence of effects pedals.

When all of the instruments and equipment are set up and soundchecked, if there are problems — crackles, hum, no signal from the guitar, no sound from an amplifier — the tech may have responsibility for troubleshooting to determine the cause or causes. Common problems include damaged patch cords, ground loops in the connections between instruments and amplifiers, weak batteries in effects boxes or on-board preamps, bad vacuum tubes in tube amplifiers or overdrive effects, broken electrical connectors or solder joints, speaker voice coils damaged from the previous concert, or equipment damaged during transport. Tuning problems may come from old or dirty strings, damaged or worn machine heads or frets, or mis-adjusted bridges.

A guitar tech is often a "jack of all trades," expected to make simple repairs: resolder a loose wiring connection inside a guitar, replace an amplifier tube, swap out a damaged speaker for a new one, reglue a loose part on an acoustic guitar, or adjust a truss rod. In cases where there is either not enough time to make the repair, or if the equipment is damaged beyond repair, the guitar tech may be responsible for finding a replacement instrument or part, either by purchasing or renting it from a local music store or by borrowing it from another band. While another member of the road crew may be dispatched to pick up an item, the tech usually writes down which models or brands are acceptable replacements.

On rare occasions, guitar technicians may be asked to fill in for the guitarist they are teching for.

== Conditions of work ==
The conditions of work for guitar techs vary widely. Some guitar techs for small touring acts may set up guitars for all of the stringed-instrument performers—rhythm guitar, lead guitar, bass, and so on; they may even take on a large variety of tasks beyond guitar tech work, such as helping to set up sound equipment or soundcheck the microphones. On the other hand, guitar techs for major touring bands may be part of a large road crew team that includes amplifier technicians, guitar technicians for each guitarist (rhythm guitarist and lead guitarist), and a variety of people who set up the stage equipment. In a major touring band, a guitar tech's duties might be more narrowly circumscribed. They might only have to set up the guitars for a single performer, and there might be other staff who set up and maintain the amplifiers, effects, and guitar stands, and electronics technicians who solder and repair connections and wiring.

The salary, benefits, and accommodations of guitar techs vary widely. The first jobs that a guitar tech does may be on a volunteer basis in a garage band or amateur group, to gain experience, or alternatively the guitar tech might work in return for a small cash payment that is more of a symbolic honorarium than a real salary. In regional-level bar bands or minor touring acts, the guitar techs may be paid on a contractual basis during the weeks or months that the group is on tour, and there may not be health or dental benefits. A guitar tech working for this type of band must find other work to fill in months when the band is not on tour. On the other hand, a major touring act may hire a guitar technician as a permanent employee and provide them with a range of benefits.

Accommodations depend on conditions set out in the contract, and the level and status of the group. A guitar tech traveling with a regional-level band may stay in inexpensive motels and receive a modest per diem for restaurant meals. A guitar tech traveling with a major touring band, however, may stay at the same first-class hotels as the star performers and eat catered buffet or restaurant meals. Some bands with substantial road crews may have their own catering crew. Guitar techs for the most famous international guitarists such as Jimmy Page or Tony Iommi can become minor celebrities within the guitar fan community because of their proximity to famous musicians and insider knowledge of how a certain guitarist's unique tone is created.

== Training and career path ==
Guitar technicians must have a broad knowledge of the musical equipment used in the types of bands they work with. At a minimum, this must consist of familiarity with setting up and tuning guitars and making simple adjustments and repairs. As well, guitar techs are often expected to set up, repair, and adjust electronic effects, tuners, pre-amplifiers, amplifiers, and pedalboards. To do these tasks, guitar techs must know about a range of audio engineering and electronics concepts—such as impedance, signal phase (for speakers and microphone wiring), and input voltage for pre-amps and effects. To do simple repairs on electronic gear, a guitar tech may have to know how to use a soldering iron and a multitester, and how to do basic electronics troubleshooting.

As well, since guitar techs need to soundcheck the instruments and amplifiers, they must have a knowledge of the way guitars and amplifiers are supposed to sound in the style of music of the band. This means that the guitar tech must have an ear for music, and for musical tones and sounds. A guitar tech for a heavy metal band must be able to tell whether distortion from a heavily over-driven tube amp is desirable tube clipping or distortion from a blown speaker or damaged power amp. The distinctions a guitar tech must make can be subtle. For example, a guitar tech replacing a blown tube with a new one may have to ensure that the tube amplifier still has the same "color" or "warmth" when chords are played through it.

To check guitar tuning, a guitar tech must be able to play major, minor, and other chords in a variety of keys. Even if the guitar has been tuned with an electronic tuner, the tuning still must be checked by ear, because the equal tempered tuning of a guitar can involve compromise. Guitar tuning can be affected by fret placement and wear, the angle of bridge angle, string age, and other factors. Thus, even if an electronic tuner indicates that a guitar is 100% "in tune," it may still need minor adjustments which are made by ear.

The training of guitar technicians varies widely. Some guitar technicians have studied music, guitar repair, amplifier maintenance, or electronics repair in college or university. On the other hand, some techs learned these skills informally on the job, or by working their way up through the ranks in a range of musical jobs, from a roadie and sound engineer to a sideman in a bar band. Guitar techs trained on the job may learn their skills by playing in amateur or semi-professional bands as a guitarist or bassist, working for music stores as a guitar repairperson, for clubs or bars as a sound engineer, or by maintaining equipment for PA system rental companies.

A typical career path for becoming a guitar technician via on the job training is to begin by volunteering in a bar band and then working for low wages in a regional touring act or a minor touring act. As they gain experience and add skills, they may seek out better-paying jobs with higher-status touring bands. Once a guitar technician has joined the road crew of a major touring act, they may seek out promotions within this organization, to jobs with greater responsibilities and higher pay. For example, a guitar tech who works as an assistant technician could try to get promoted to a guitar technician for the lead guitarist. A guitar tech who completes a guitar repair program at a college or lutherie school may be able to enter midway up the guitar tech career ladder.

In the early part of a guitar tech's career, there might be a great deal of mobility between different types of bands and technician roles. While working for minor or regional acts, a guitar tech may be able to work for a country rock bar band and then immediately switch to being the bass tech for a hard rock tribute band, because the tasks are fairly uniform. Career mobility of guitar technicians tends to become more constrained, though, when guitar techs begin to get jobs with high-status professional touring acts from specific genres. When a regional bar band looks for a guitar tech for a summer nightclub tour, there may many guitar techs who could meet the skill requirements. However, if an internationally known 1960s-style acid rock touring act with a celebrity lead guitarist goes on a major tour, there may be only a handful of guitar techs who have the unique combination of skills for this position.

== Bass guitar technician ==
Bass guitar technicians (or "bass techs") perform the same functions for a bass guitar player. The bass guitar is a variety of electric guitar pitched below a regular electric guitar, typically by one octave. Many basic elements of the two types of instruments are similar enough—magnetic pickups routed to an electronic amplifier—that a guitar technician is usually able to work as a bass guitar technician if they become familiar with the unique aspects of the electric bass. The electric bass differs from the electric guitar in several respects. To become a bass tech, a person must learn how to set up the string action (height) and adjust the height of the pickups so that the bassist is able to create the tones associated with different bass styles. Depending on the band, these styles might include such as slap and pop, tapping, or upright bass-style playing with the thumb.

As with guitar techs, a bass tech also sets up the amplification equipment and effects pedals. Due to the lower pitch of the bass guitar, this instrument is amplified with specialized bass instrument amplifiers. While bass guitarists do not usually use as many effects pedals as most guitarists (e.g., reverb, chorus, flanger, etc.), most professional bassists may use a few "sound conditioner" effects such as a compressor, limiter, or equalizer. Some bassists also use octave pedals to generate extremely low pitches or bass overdrive pedals that produce a fuzzy, distorted sound. Although these effects function in the same way as regular electric guitar effects, a bass tech must be familiar with the settings and the resulting sounds and tones that are most often used by bass guitarists. A guitar tech who is in the first stages of learning to become a bass tech may know how to set up the bass effects from a technical point of view, but it may take a little longer for them to learn which compressor settings, for example, are associated with different funk or metal styles.

In some country, rockabilly, or jazz bands, the bass tech might also be responsible for setting up, tuning, and maintaining an upright bass or electric upright bass. In some folk or acoustic bands, the bass technician may also be responsible for maintaining an acoustic bass guitar, which is a larger, bass version of a standard acoustic guitar. More rarely, some bass techs might have to set up a bass synth (e.g., as used by the bassists in some alternative bands) or bass pedal keyboard such as a Moog Taurus pedal, as used by Sting or Led Zeppelin. Both upright basses and acoustic bass guitars usually use piezoelectric pickups rather than magnetic pickups, and in some cases, the instruments may use condenser mics to pick up the higher range sounds. To amplify instruments with piezo transducers and condenser mics, specialized impedance-matching preamplifiers are often required. Also, since both piezoelectric transducers and microphones are more prone to unwanted feedback than magnetic pickups, the bass tech may have to set up a notch filter with a parametric equalizer to reduce the frequency that is feeding back.
