= Last Stop: Crappy Town =

Studio album by Reggie and the Full Effect
- Released: June 17, 2008
- Recorded: 2006
- Genres: Alternative rock; post-hardcore; metalcore
- Length: 38:01
- Label: Vagrant
- Producer: Sean Beavan

Reggie and the Full Effect chronology
Songs Not to Get Married To (2005)	Last Stop: Crappy Town (2008)	No Country for Old Musicians (2013)

Professional ratings
Review scores
Source	Rating
AbsolutePunk	(78%) link
AllMusic	link

Last Stop: Crappy Town is the fifth studio album by American rock band Reggie and the Full Effect. The album was released on June 17, 2008.

== History ==
After a brief stint as a member of New Found Glory and the subsequent breakup of The Get Up Kids in 2005, James Dewees brought Reggie and the Full Effect out as an opening act for bands such as Alkaline Trio, My Chemical Romance and Hellogoodbye. Once the tour supporting Hellogoodbye ended in the fall of November 2006, Dewees began working with My Chemical Romance as their touring keyboardist. He had dropped out of his slot for the 2006 Warped Tour to record a new Reggie album, but save for a demo of "F-Train" (later known as just "F"), posted on the band's MySpace for 24 hours on Halloween 2006 the fans still hadn't heard anything of its release. Somewhat cryptic MySpace messages were posted and rumors began to spread about Dewees abandoning the project and joining My Chemical Romance full-time.

The album, formerly titled "She Loves Me Not", saw many delays and incarnations before its final release date was set by Vagrant Records who, it was heavily rumored, were unhappy with its darker themes and heavier approach. However, in an interview with Lawrence.com soon after the album's release, it was revealed that the album was delayed because of logistical problems with James supporting the album and touring with My Chemical Romance. Then, on April 8, 2008 Alternative Press published an article announcing that Reggie and the Full Effect would be releasing its fifth album, now titled Last Stop: Crappy Town on June 17, 2008. On April 5, Vagrant Records made an official announcement and posted the album page on its website. On May 10, the song "J" was released on their Myspace.

On July 16, it was revealed that the first single from the album would be "J", and that a music video has been filmed. The video is now up in the video section of the Reggie and the Full Effect MySpace, along with a "Making Of" video. The video features Frank Iero from My Chemical Romance as Frankenstein's monster and was directed by John Carluccio.

The album sold fairly well, reaching #29 on the Billboard Heatseekers Chart.

== Significance ==
On July 5 James responded to questions about the darker themes and lyrics present on the album. "Last Stop: Crappy Town isn't a record about the subway system in Brooklyn, its [sic?] a record about the trains in Brooklyn I took to get to rehab everyday [sic?]. The trains are basically metaphors that just happen to really exist, that's what I thought was so amazing about the idea."

On June 30, Lawrence.com published an interview with Dewees that further elaborated on this idea: "The record was inspired solely by me going to rehab. It was a choice that I made. New York is a great city and you can get anything that you want at any time of the day – and I was getting anything I wanted at any time of the day. One morning I was like, 'What a fucking mess I’ve made.' I decided to get clean." The songs on the album directly chart the path Dewees took to rehab (the album's titular "Crappy Town"), including “86th Street”, a song cut from the album.

== Track listing ==
All tracks are written by James Dewees.

Last Stop: Crappy Town
No.	Title	Length
1.	"G"	3:37
2.	"Smith & 9th"	4:05
3.	"F"	2:59
4.	"E"	4:05
5.	"3rd Ave"	1:03
6.	"L"	3:41
7.	"J"	2:56
8.	"V"	4:16
9.	"Lorimer St."	1:26
10.	"R"	4:16
11.	"36th St."	1:18
12.	"N"	4:19
Total length:		38:01

B-Sides
No.	Title	Length
1.	"Shit Sandwich"	3:20

== Personnel ==
- James Dewees – vocals, keyboards
- Billy Johnson – drums
- Paul Gray – bass
- Cory White – guitars
- Sean Beavan – production, mixing, sound engineer

== Album Position ==
Year	Album	Chart	Position
2008	Last Stop: Crappy Town	Billboard Heatseekers	29
