= Death Spells =

American rock band

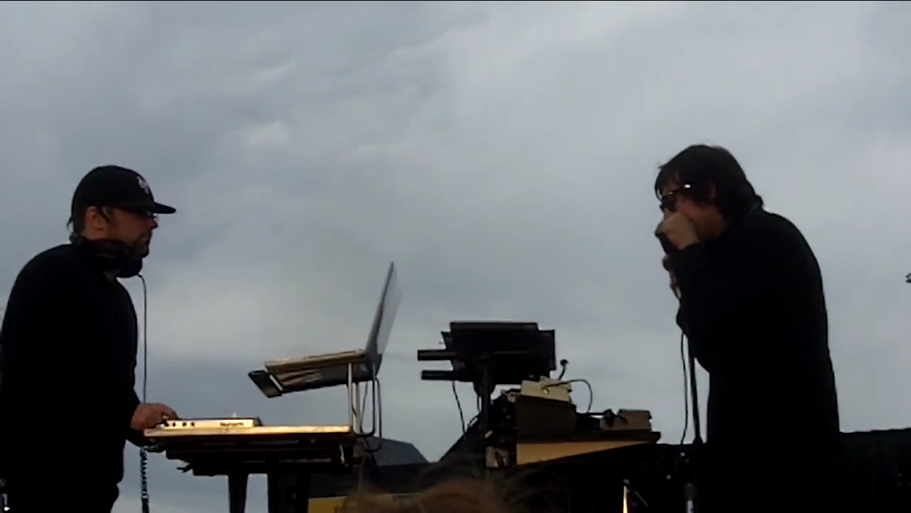
- Death Spells performing at Skate and Surf in 2013

Background information
- Origin: New Jersey, U.S.
- Genres: Digital hardcore; electropunk; glitch; industrial
- Years active: 2012–2013; 2016
- Labels: Vagrant; Hassle; Cooking Vinyl
- Spinoff of: My Chemical Romance
- Past members: Frank Iero; James Dewees
- Website: deathspellsmusic.com

Death Spells was an American digital hardcore band formed in 2012. The group was composed of vocalist Frank Iero, rhythm guitarist of My Chemical Romance, and keyboardist James Dewees, formerly of The Get Up Kids and Reggie and the Full Effect. Both Iero and Dewees were also previously members of hardcore punk band Leathermouth.

== History ==
Frank Iero and James Dewees were sharing an apartment in North Hollywood, Los Angeles in 2012 while My Chemical Romance was writing and recording in studio. The project originally came to fruition when Iero and Dewees snuck equipment out of the studio so they could mess around with it and were "trying to blow up each other's speakers." The seediness of the area they were located in was a huge influence to the music, with the pair aiming to get "as grimy as humanely possible" without getting kicked out of the apartment.

In 2013, after My Chemical Romance disbanded, Death Spells started touring. This included a support slot on Mindless Self Indulgence's East Coast US tour as well as playing Skate And Surf festival. Starting a week before the Mindless Self Indulgence tour, Death Spells posted a short demo of a new song each night at midnight, culminating this with their first full single "Where Are My Fucking Pills?" and an accompanying music video. A full-length album was expected to be released in late 2013, however this never happened due to them moving onto other projects. The band supported The Architects in three shows in late 2013 and released a limited cassette release available at those shows.

Death Spells released their debut studio album "Nothing Above, Nothing Below" on July 29, 2016. Following the release of the album, Iero and Dewees went on a small headlining tour with four dates in the UK, one date in Moscow, and two dates in the United States. The band performed at Riot Fest in Denver and Chicago in September 2016. It was announced that they played be played two shows with Iero's solo project, frnkiero and the patience, on the days immediately before and after their Riot Fest Chicago performances.

== Members ==
- Frank Iero – lead vocals, programming
- James Dewees – programming, keyboards

== Discography ==
=== EPs ===
- Choke On One Another / Sunday Came Undone (2013)

=== Studio albums ===
- Nothing Above, Nothing Below (2016)
