= Death Spell =

Death Spell may refer to:

- Death Spells, an American electropunk band
- Deathspell Omega, a French black metal band
