= Violet (L.S. Dunes album) =

Studio album by L.S. Dunes
- Released: January 31, 2025
- Studio: Studio 4 (Conshohocken)
- Genre: Post-hardcore
- Length: 38:58
- Label: Fantasy
- Producer: L.S. Dunes; Will Yip

L.S. Dunes chronology
Lost Songs: Lines and Shapes (2023)	Violet (2025)

Singles from Violet
- 1. "Fatal Deluxe" Released: September 20, 2024; 2. "Machines" Released: October 18, 2024; 3. "Paper Tigers" Released: November 22, 2024; 4. "Violet" Released: January 8, 2025

Violet is the second studio album by American rock supergroup L.S. Dunes. It was released on January 31, 2025, by Fantasy Records and distributed through Concord. The album was supported by four singles: "Fatal Deluxe", "Machines", "Paper Tigers", and "Violet".

== Background and production ==
L.S. Dunes released their debut studio album, Past Lives, on November 11, 2022. After completing that album's supporting tour, the band began working on their second studio album. On September 20, 2024, the band released "Fatal Deluxe", which Frank Iero described as "[marking] the official opening of chapter two for L.S. Dunes". The band formally announced their second album, Violet, on October 17. In an interview with Billboard, Tim Payne stated that the album "encapsulates everything we've been trying to accomplish since we formed as a band, which is to give us each, as individual musicians, a safe space to explore music in ways that we have not yet had the chance to". Violet was produced by Will Yip, the same producer behind Past Lives.

== Composition ==
Violet is predominantly a post-hardcore album, with certain songs being inspired by other genres like grunge rock and indie rock.

== Release ==
The album was released on January 31, 2025, through Fantasy Records and distributed through Concord. Four singles preceded the album's release. The album's lead single was the aforementioned "Fatal Deluxe". It was then followed by "Machines" on October 18, preceding the band's performance at When We Were Young 2024. A music video for "Machines" was also released, co-directed by Iero and David Brodsky. The third and fourth singles, "Paper Tigers" and "Violet", were released on November 22, 2024, and January 8, 2025, respectively. Like "Machines", "Violet" was released alongside a music video, directed by Ian Shelton.

To support the release of Violet, L.S. Dunes embarked on a North American tour throughout early 2025.

== Critical reception ==
Violet ratings
Aggregate scores
Source	Rating
Metacritic	82/100
Review scores
Source	Rating
Clash	8/10
DIY	4/5 stars
Kerrang!	4/5

According to the review aggregator Metacritic, Violet received "universal acclaim" based on a weighted average score of 82 out of 100 from 5 critic scores.

== Track listing ==
All tracks are written by Anthony Green, Frank Iero, Tim Payne, Travis Stever, and Tucker Rule.

Violet track listing
No.	Title	Length
1.	"Like Magick"	4:15
2.	"Fatal Deluxe"	3:31
3.	"I Can See It Now..."	3:45
4.	"Violet"	4:21
5.	"Machines"	4:06
6.	"You Deserve to Be Haunted"	3:28
7.	"Holograms"	3:41
8.	"Paper Tigers"	3:48
9.	"Things I Thought Would Last Forever"	3:43
10.	"Forgiveness"	4:20
Total length:		38:58

== Personnel ==
Credits adapted from the album's liner notes.

=== L.S. Dunes ===
- Anthony Green – vocals, production
- Frank Iero – guitar, production
- Tim Payne – bass, production
- Travis Stever – guitar, production
- Tucker Rule – drums, production

=== Technical ===
- Will Yip – production, engineering, mixing
- Ryan Smith – mastering
- Gordon Douglas Ball – art
- Sage Lamonica – layout, design
- Shelley Weiss – violin on "Forgiveness"

== Charts ==
Weekly chart performance for Violet
Chart	Peak position
UK Rock & Metal Albums (OCC)	3
