= James Dewees =

American musician (born 1976)

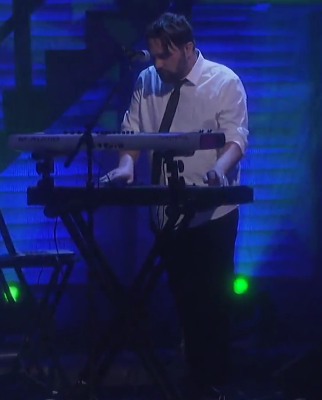
- James Dewees performing with Gerard Way in 2014

Background information
- Born: James Matthew Dewees; March 13, 1976 (age 50)
- Origin: Liberty, Missouri, U.S.
- Genres: Post-hardcore; pop-punk; alternative rock; emo; hardcore punk; metalcore; mathcore; electronicore; indie rock; digital hardcore
- Instruments: Vocals; keyboards; drums
- Years active: 1995–present
- Member of: Reggie and the Full Effect
- Formerly of: Coalesce; The Get Up Kids; My Chemical Romance; Leathermouth; Death Spells

James Matthew Dewees (born March 13, 1976) is an American musician best known for his work with The Get Up Kids, Reggie and the Full Effect and My Chemical Romance. He has also been involved in other musical projects including New Found Glory, Coalesce, Leathermouth, and Death Spells.

== History ==
=== Early life and Coalesce ===
Dewees graduated from Liberty High School in Liberty, Missouri in 1994. He started college at William Jewell College in Liberty later transferring to the University of Missouri to study music composition. In 1995, he was asked to replace Sean Ingram as vocalist for the Kansas City hardcore band Coalesce. This angered Ingram, and caused a fight that eventually broke the band up. However, in the summer of 1996, the band decided to re-form, but this time with James Dewees as a drummer. With them, he recorded the band's first two full-length albums Give Them Rope and Functioning on Impatience. Dewees was later kicked out of college for missing too many classes while touring with the band.

=== The Get Up Kids ===
In 1997, Coalesce played a music festival in Wilkes-Barre, Pennsylvania with fellow Kansas City band The Get Up Kids. At the end of Coalesce's set, they began smashing all of their equipment. Dewees picked up his floor tom and threw it into the audience, hitting a girl on the head. An audience member then tried to steal the drum, so Dewees began chasing them, aided by The Get Up Kids' guitarist Jim Suptic. They started talking, and Suptic invited Dewees to hang out with the rest of the band.

Coalesce and The Get Up Kids began collaborating more and more, playing shows together and eventually covering each other's songs for a split 7-inch. Dewees recorded keyboard parts for the band on their Red Letter Day EP, and after its release, joined the band full-time. After the release of the band's second album Something to Write Home About, The Get Up Kids began receiving much greater national attention. In order to capitalize off of the success of Something to Write Home About, as well as bridge the gap between their next album, the band released a collection of B-sides and rarities, entitled Eudora, in 2000. This also included a re-make of "A Newfound Interest in Massachusetts", with a new arrangement placing a much heavier emphasis on the piano.

In 2002, the band released their third studio album, On a Wire, produced by Scott Litt. The album was a major departure from the band's previous, poppier sound, and struggled sales-wise as a result. In 2004, the band released their fourth album Guilt Show. The album was met with a much warmer reception than On a Wire, but there was a great deal of tension between the bandmates during their world tour supporting the release. Lead singer Matt Pryor, whose wife had recently given birth, wanted to spend more time at home. At one stop in Australia, the band broke up before deciding to finish the tour. However, they decided that they would do one final farewell tour before going their separate ways for good. Around the beginning of their final tour, the band released Live! @ The Granada Theater, their first live album. As the title suggests, the album was recorded at the Granada Theater in Lawrence, Kansas at the band's tenth-anniversary show. On July 2, 2005, the band played their final show at The Uptown Theater in Kansas City, Missouri.

On August 28, 2008, Dewees announced the band's 2009 reunion tour. The Get Up Kids also did a tour in Japan in November 2013, and played shows in the US in Spring 2015.

On September 7, 2019, it was announced through the band's Instagram page that Dewees was no longer a member of The Get Up Kids.

=== Reggie and the Full Effect ===
While playing with the Get Up Kids full-time, Dewees began to write some of his own songs. However, he did not feel as though they fit with the distinct style of The Get Up Kids, so with the assistance of bandmate Matt Pryor, he recorded Greatest Hits 1984-1987, releasing it on Vagrant Records in 1998 under the name Reggie and the Full Effect. He continued to write songs, releasing his second album Promotional Copy two years later.

In 2003, he released a third album entitled Under the Tray. After this album released, his marriage to his first wife Megan began to break down. He was soon involved in a bitter divorce, much of which inspired his fourth album Songs Not to Get Married To, which he was writing and recording during the divorce. On April 8, 2008, Alternative Press announced that they had received details on the new album from Reggie and the Full Effect. The 12-song album Last Stop: Crappy Town was produced by Sean Beavan, with tracks also produced by Paul Gray from Slipknot, and was released on June 17, 2008, through Vagrant Records.

James sent a tweet in early 2013 saying "welcome back to Reggieland." He set up a Kickstarter project to help fund the release of his next album. After this was a huge success the album titled No Country for Old Musicians was released in November 2013 under Pure Noise Records.

In February 2018, he released '41', again through Pure Noise. The band later went on tour supporting this album and also toured as a support act with Frank Iero and the Future Violents in 2019.

=== Other work ===
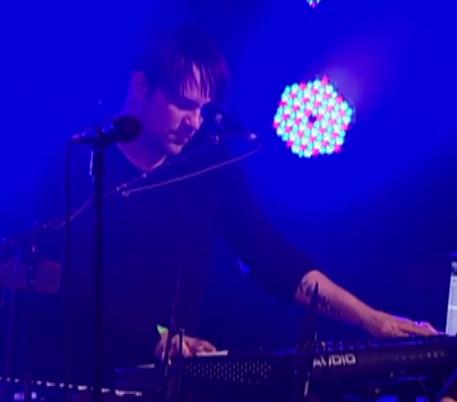
Dewees in 2011

After The Get Up Kids split up in the summer of 2005, Dewees entered the studio to write and record tracks with New Found Glory for their album Catalyst, later embarking with them on a tour to support the album.

In 2007, he joined My Chemical Romance as their touring keyboardist, becoming an official member albeit for a short period of time in 2012 until the band's split in 2013. He wrote "upwards of 30 songs" for their fifth album before the band's decision to split. One of these songs, "Fake Your Death", released as part of the band's first greatest hits compilation, May Death Never Stop You, in 2014, marking the band's only official track featuring Dewees. He was also heavily involved in the band's live sound design contributing greatly to their live productions.

In late 2012, Dewees began collaborating with Get Up Kids bandmate Matt Pryor on a series of demos. The collaboration grew into several East Coast tours in early 2013, and a self-titled EP as Matt Pryor and James Dewees that October. He also formed digital hardcore act Death Spells with Frank Iero. The duo began touring and released their debut single "Where Are My Fucking Pills?" and an accompanying music video. Death Spells released the full-length album Nothing Above, Nothing Below in 2016.

In 2014, Reggie and the Full Effect went on a spring US headline tour then followed it up by supporting Say Anything and Saves The Day on their end of the year anniversary tour, choosing to perform Under the Tray in full. Dewees was also credited as a co-writer on "Millions" by Gerard Way and began touring alongside Way as the keyboardist of his backing band The Hormones.

=== Personalities ===
On the various Reggie albums, James has created a series of different personas that appear as "guests" on the album. One of these personalities is "Klaus", the frontman for the fictional Finnish metal band Common Denominator. There have been five Common Denominator songs on Reggie and the Full Effect albums; "Dwarf Invasion" on Promotional Copy, "Linkin' Verbs" on Under the Tray, "Deathnotronic" on Songs Not to Get Married To, "Dmv Featuring Common Denominator" on No Country for Old Musicians, and "Trap(ing) Music" on 41. The other personality present on many of his albums is "Fluxuation", a British techno-pop star. His credits include "Gloves" on Promotional Copy, "Mood 4 LUV" on Under the Tray, "Love Reality" on Songs Not to Get Married To, "Sundae, Booty Sundae, Feat: Fluxuation" on No Country for Old Musicians, and "Channing Tatum Space Rollerblading Montage Music" on 41.

== Other bands ==
- After The Get Up Kids separated in 2005, Dewees became the touring keyboardist for New Found Glory. He had previously helped write and record keyboard parts for their 2004 album Catalyst.
- On June 30, 2008, in an interview with Lawrence.com, Dewees said he is "playing drums in a new band called Leathermouth [with] a bunch of dudes from New Jersey. Their drummer quit... I've been rehearsing with them a lot and I like it a lot." The band was on tour with Reggie and the Full Effect, with Dewees on drums. Likewise, the band's vocalist Frank Iero (also from My Chemical Romance) has played bass for Reggie and the Full Effect at live shows.

== Discography ==
=== with Coalesce ===
- Give Them Rope (1998)
- Functioning on Impatience (1998)
- 0:12 Revolution in Just Listening (1999)

=== with The Get Up Kids ===
- Something to Write Home About (1999)
- On a Wire (2002)
- Guilt Show (2004)
- There Are Rules (2011)
- Kicker (2018)
- Problems (2019)

=== as Reggie and the Full Effect ===
- Greatest Hits 1984-1987 (1998)
- Promotional Copy (2000)
- Under the Tray (2003)
- Songs Not to Get Married To (2005)
- Last Stop: Crappy Town (2008)
- No Country for Old Musicians (2013)
- 41 (2018)

=== with New Found Glory ===
- Catalyst (2004)

=== with My Chemical Romance ===
- "Fake Your Death" (2014)

=== With Leathermouth ===
- XO (2009)

=== With Frank Iero ===
- "This Song Is a Curse" (2012)
- "Stomachaches" (2014)

=== With Matt Pryor ===
- Matt Pryor and James Dewees (2013)

=== With Death Spells ===
- Limited Tape (2013)
- Nothing Above, Nothing Below (2016)
