= Southamerican Tour 2019 =

2019 concert tour by Frank Iero

- Tour by Frank Iero and the Future Violents
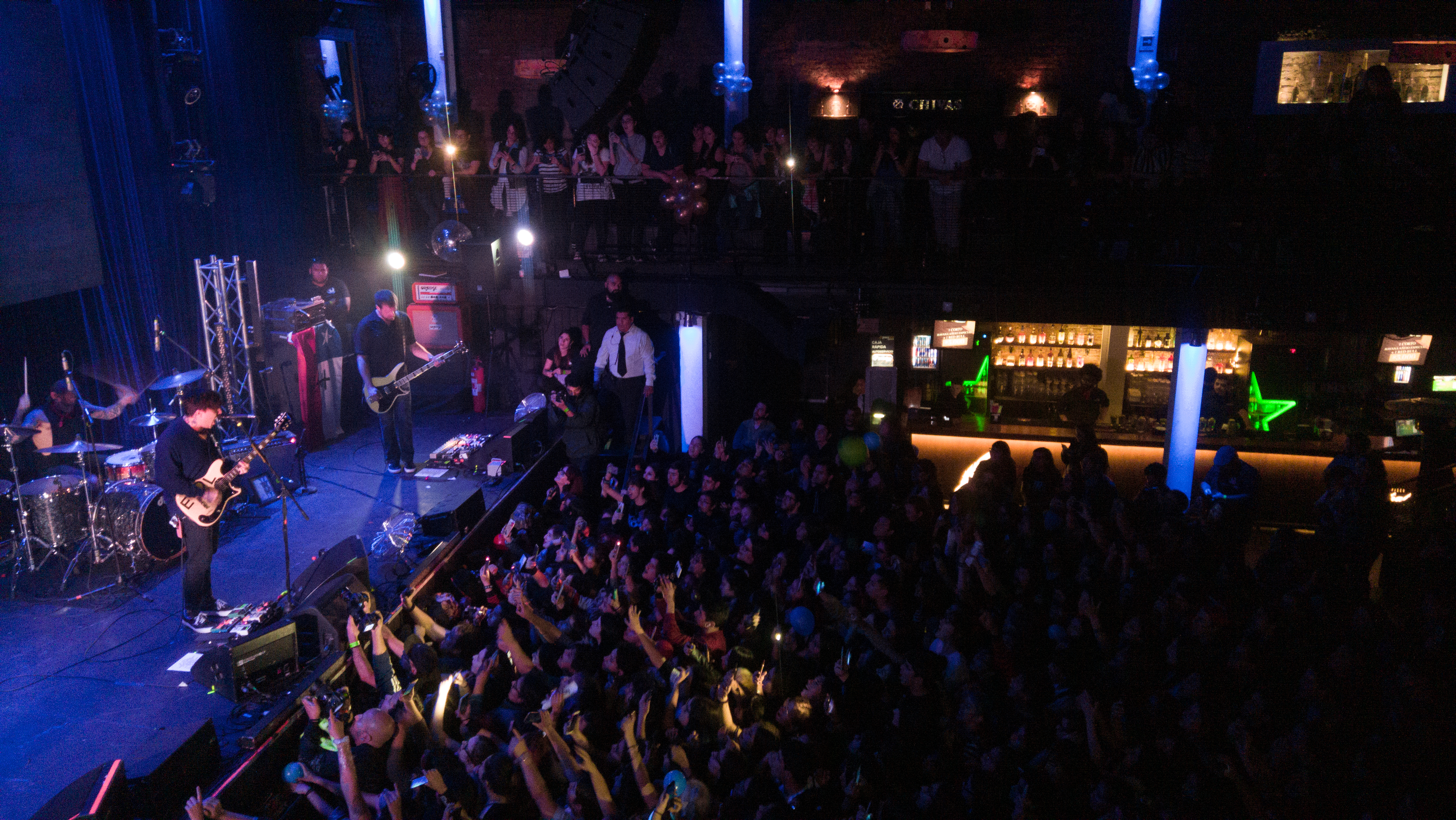
- Frank Iero and the Future Violents performing in Santiago
- Location: Latin America
- Associated album: Barriers
- Start date: April 24, 2019
- End date: September 29, 2019
- No. of shows: 7

Frank Iero and the Future Violents concert chronology
- Southamerican Tour (2019); North American Tour

The Southamerican Tour 2019 was a concert tour by American rock musician Frank Iero (on his project Frank Iero and the Future Violents) through South America and Mexico, originally planned for April and May, 2019. It was a promotional tour for Iero's third studio album, Barriers, released on May 31; it had performances in Peru, Chile, Argentina and Brazil; then, a three-date leg in Mexico was added, which was postponed to September for health reasons.

After these performances, Iero did a North American Tour.

== Announcement and scheduling ==
On January 22, 2019, Frank Iero along with some press announced his South American tour, which by then included shows in only three countries: Peru, Chile and Brazil.

On January 31, given the high demand and after 2 advance-ticket stages (out of 3) selling out, it was announced that venue in Santiago de Chile would change from Club Subterráneo to Club Chocolate; the latter had the benefit of being all ages, too.

On February 28, Iero stated that after the performances in South America he would do shows in Mexico City and Monterrey, as well as adding a date in Buenos Aires, Argentina. Finally, a show in Guadalajara, Mexico was scheduled.

== Postponement of Mexico leg ==
Due to a health issue while in South America, Iero had to postpone the Mexican leg.

Once in the US, during a livestream for Loudwire on May 8, he claimed to be still "dealing with this Brazilian case". Guitarist Evan Nestor said, while reading some questions: "This is a good one: When are you coming to Mexico?", to which Iero replied:

Can I say it? September. The last weekend of September. We're gonna be back in Mexico and re-do those shows. Sorry about that. You can hear it! I'm still f up, it's terrible, I feel bad, I'm sorry! But I couldn't, man... We did two international flights, I arrived in Mexico with a 103 °F fever [...] It was horrible. It went to my chest... It was horrible, horrible, horrible. I'm sorry, but it was for a good reason, and we'll see you soon.

== Tour dates ==
List of concerts, showing date, city, country and venue
Date	City	Country	Venue
Latin America
April 24, 2019	Lima	Peru	CC Festiva
April 26, 2019	Santiago	Chile	Club Chocolate
April 27, 2019	Buenos Aires	Argentina	El Teatrito
April 28, 2019	São Paulo	Brazil	Fabrique Club
September 27, 2019	Guadalajara	Mexico	C3 Stage
September 28, 2019	Monterrey	Mexico	Café Iguana
September 29, 2019	Mexico City	Mexico	Auditorio BB
