= Pentimento (band) =

- Origin: Buffalo, New York
- Genres: Punk rock, emo, pop punk
- Years active: 2011–present
- Labels: Bad Timing Records, Panic Records, Paper + Plastick, Black Numbers, Soft Speak Records, Arrest Records
- Members: Jeramiah Pauly; Vincent Caito; Lance Claypool; Michael Hansen

Pentimento is an American punk rock band from Buffalo, New York.

== History ==
Pentimento formed in the year 2011. Since then, they have released two full-length albums, two EPs, and two splits. In November 2011, the band supported Last Call on tour. Pentimento went on two co-headlining tours with Light Years. The first was a 2011–2012 winter U.S. tour with Light Years. The second tour was a European tour in February 2012. The band released their debut self-titled full length on November 13, 2012. Following complications with their label, the band decided to release their debut album for free. In the spring of 2013, the band went on the March Radness Tour with Candy Hearts and Allison Weiss. In the Summer of 2013, the band supported Less than Jake and Hostage Calm along the East Coast. In the fall of 2013, the band embarked on a tour with Real Friends, Forever Came Calling, and Mixtapes. Pentimento supported Reggie and the Full Effect and Dads on their 2014 winter tour. Pentimento went on a summer tour in July 2014 with Have Mercy and Gates The band has had appearances on major festivals across the United States and Canada including Riot Fest, Skate 'n Surf and The FEST. August 2014 the band performed in front of thousands in Buffalo, NY supporting Weezer, Brand New and The Sheila Divine. In early 2015, they went on tour with A Loss For Words. On June 10, 2015, Pentimento released a song titled Stuck Forever from their upcoming second studio album I, No Longer, which was released on October 23, 2015. Pentimento went on tour in October and November 2015 to support the new album. While not officially on hiatus, the band has largely been inactive since 2016.

== Band members ==
- Jeramiah Pauly - Vocals/Guitar
- Vincent Caito - Bass
- Lance Claypool - Guitar
- Michael Hansen - Drums

== Discography ==
Full Length Albums

- I, No Longer (2015)
- Pentimento (2012)

EPs

- Inside The Sea (2013)
- Wrecked (2011)

Splits

- Pentimento / Young English (2011)
