= Songs Not to Get Married To =

Studio album by Reggie and the Full Effect
- Released: March 29, 2005 (USA)
- Recorded: 2004
- Genre: Emo; post-hardcore; metalcore; pop-punk; electropop
- Length: 40:38
- Label: Vagrant
- Producer: Ed Rose

Reggie and the Full Effect chronology
| Under the Tray (2003) | Songs Not to Get Married To (2005) | Last Stop: Crappy Town (2008) |

Professional ratings
Review scores
| Source | Rating |
|---|---|
| AllMusic | 2.5/5 stars |

Songs Not to Get Married To is the fourth studio album by American rock band Reggie and the Full Effect. The album still follows the same musical style as previous albums, but the concept of the album is a lot darker than past releases from the band. Right before and during the writing and recording of the album, James Dewees went through a divorce with his wife, Megan. Most of the songs on the album deal with the anger and sadness of going through a divorce.

The album sold rather well, reaching #25 on the Billboard Heatseekers Chart and #26 on the Billboard's Independent Albums chart.

The song "Get Well Soon" is featured on the 2006 video game Saints Row, and an altered version of "Take Me Home, Please" was featured in the 2005 video game The Sims 2.

== Track listing ==
All tracks are written by James Dewees.

Songs Not to Get Married To
| No. | Title | Length |
|---|---|---|
| 1. | "What the Hell is Contempt?" | 3:13 |
| 2. | "Get Well Soon" | 3:34 |
| 3. | "What the Hell is Stipulation?" | 3:48 |
| 4. | "Caving" | 4:09 |
| 5. | "The Trooth" | 2:40 |
| 6. | "Guess Who's Back?" | 0:36 |
| 7. | "Take Me Home, Please" | 4:10 |
| 8. | "Thanks for the Misery" | 3:46 |
| 9. | "The Fuck Stops Here" | 3:43 |
| 10. | "Love Reality" | 2:49 |
| 11. | "Laura's Australian Dance Party" | 1:32 |
| 12. | "Deathnotronic" | 2:23 |
| 13. | "Playing Dead" | 4:15 |
| Total length: | | 40:38 |

Japanese import bonus tracks
| No. | Title | Length |
|---|---|---|
| 1. | "Spoon To The Moon" | 1:40 |
| 2. | "Bobby McFerrin Better Worry" | 3:39 |

== Personnel ==
=== Band ===
- James Dewees – Vocals, Keyboard
- Cory White – Guitar
- Rob Pope – Bass
- Ryan Pope – Drums

=== Other ===
- Ed Rose – Production, Mixing
- Benjamin Perri – Vocals
- Sean Ingram – Vocals

== Charts ==
| Year | Album | Chart | Position |
|---|---|---|---|
| 2005 | Songs Not to Get Married To | Top Heatseekers | 25 |
| 2005 | Songs Not to Get Married To | Independent Albums | 26 |
