= XO (Leathermouth album) =

Studio album by Leathermouth
- Released: January 27, 2009
- Recorded: Late 2008
- Genre: Hardcore punk
- Length: 23:37
- Label: Epitaph
- Producers: Steve Oyolla, Leathermouth

Professional ratings
Review scores
Source	Rating
Alternative Press	3.5/5 stars
Bombshellzine.com	6/10 stars
Kerrang!	4/5 stars
NME	(8/10)
ThePunkSite.com	(3.5/5)
Rock Sound	(9/10)
Thrash Hits	(5/6)

XO (often typeset as XØ) is the only album by Leathermouth, My Chemical Romance's rhythm guitarist Frank Iero's hardcore punk side project. Although the album did not chart on the Billboard 200, it did reach No. 21 on the Top Heatseekers chart.

== Lyrical themes ==
Leathermouth serves as lead singer Frank Iero's first project where he has written lyrics. He has used this band as a way to vent about things that make him angry, and also the issues that have been attached to his depression and anxiety problems. Many songs hit on "topics people want to forget exist" and the album as a whole suggests that "the world is going to shit, and someone has to say it." The song "5th Period Massacre" reflects Iero's feelings on school shootings and how the entertainment industry is often blamed for these events, and the song "Sunsets Are For Muggings" is about Iero's visits to the psychiatrist, and the mental illnesses in his family. Iero discusses his feelings on the theme of the album:

I would say this record is about trying to wake people up to what is happening right in front of their eyes. We are all trying our hardest to pretend bad things don't happen to good people, and that there is some higher power looking over us... but it's bullshit. Stop covering your children's eyes. Everything is fucked, and pretending it's not isn't making things any better. I'm tired of people praying for a change when it's up to them to get off their asses and make a change.

— Frank Iero

Lyrics were also inspired by 80s horror films that Iero watched as a child, and many songs on the album were about issues today and used the imagery of 80s horror films to illustrate the points.

Frank Iero said in a 2009 interview with Alternative Press, the Secret Service paid him a visit regarding his song "I Am Going to Kill the President of the United States of America." He explained that he wrote it when he was touring overseas with My Chemical Romance. He saw Anti-American rallies everyday, and explained that he wrote it from the protester's point of view. According to Iero, the Secret Service told him if he rereleased the song or ever played the song live again that he would be arrested. When the album was rereleased on vinyl in 2018, the band was forced to censor the name of the song.

== Release ==
On December 2, 2008, XO was announced for release in January 2009. Also in December, the band performed a handful of shows. On January 8, 2009, "Sunsets Are for Muggings" was posted on the group's Myspace. XO was made available for streaming on January 20, before being released through Epitaph Records on January 27. On February 12, a music video was released for "Bodysnatchers 4 Ever" on the group's Myspace.

== Track listing ==
All tracks are written by Leathermouth.

No.	Title	Length
1.	"5th Period Massacre"	2:13
2.	"Catch Me If You Can"	2:30
3.	"This Song Is About Being Attacked by Monsters"	2:40
4.	"I Am Going to Kill the President of the United States of America"	2:58
5.	"Murder Was the Case That They Gave Me"	2:46
6.	"Sunsets Are for Muggings"	1:57
7.	"My Lovenote Has Gone Flat"	2:21
8.	"Your Friends Are Full of Shit"	2:05
9.	"Bodysnatchers 4 Ever"	2:10
10.	"Leviathan"	1:57
Total length:		23:37

iTunes bonus track
No.	Title	Length
11.	"Myself"	2:14
Total length:		25:51

== Personnel ==
Leathermouth

- Frank Iero – Lead vocals
- Rob Hughes – Guitar, backing vocals
- John McGuire – bass, backing vocals
- James Dewees – drums, percussion
- Ed Auletta – Guitar

Additional personnel

- Produced by Steve Oyolla and Leathermouth in basements throughout the New York and New Jersey area
- Mastered by George Marino at Sterling Sound NYC
- Record layout by Matt Erny, Casey Howard and Leathermouth
