= Greatest Hits 1984–1987 =

Greatest Hits 1984-1987

Studio album by Reggie and the Full Effect
- Released: April 20, 1999
- Recorded: 1998
- Genre: Emo, pop-punk
- Length: 35:38
- Label: Second Nature, Vagrant (reissue)
- Producer: Ed Rose

Reggie and the Full Effect chronology
Greatest Hits 1984-1987 (1999)	Promotional Copy (2000)

Alternative cover
- Alternative cover for the 2004 re-issue

Professional ratings
Review scores
Source	Rating
AllMusic	link

Greatest Hits 1984–1987 is the debut LP release by American rock band Reggie and the Full Effect. The album was well received upon release and is considered a classic by fans.

== History ==
This is the first album released by Reggie and the Full Effect. It was recorded in 1998 and released in 1999, and was the only Reggie and the Full Effect album to be released on Second Nature Recordings, with all subsequent albums (including this album's 2004 reissue) being released on Vagrant Records. The album was re-issued in 2004 to include several bonus tracks and demos.

== Track listing ==
All tracks are written by James Dewees.

Greatest Hits 1984–1987
No.	Title	Length
1.	"Drunk Guy at the Get Up Kids Show"	0:07
2.	"Girl, Why'd You Run Away?"	2:31
3.	"Fiona Apple Can Kiss My Black Ass"	0:05
4.	"What's Wrong"	3:36
5.	"Props to Tha Queen of Pop A.K.A. Keep On Climbin' That Velvet Rope Baby"	0:06
6.	"Your Girlfriends Hate Me"	2:25
7.	"Megan Is My Friend To The Max"	3:08
8.	"My Dad - Happy Chickens (Kirksta Party to Go Mix)"	0:21
9.	"Another Runaway Song"	3:36
10.	"Drunk Guy Talks Chemicals to Us at the Get Up Kids Show"	0:27
11.	"Your Boyfriend Hates Me"	3:26
12.	"Pick Up the Phone Master P"	0:20
13.	"Where's Your Heart"	3:02
14.	"Get to the Choppa!"	0:14
15.	"Better For You"	7:28
16.	"Everything's Okay"	2:12
17.	"Just a Reminder"	0:05
18.	"Brandi's Birthday Song"	2:29
Total length:		35:38

=== Reissue bonus tracks ===
The album was re-released in 2004 by Vagrant Records and included 7 bonus previously unreleased tracks.

All tracks are written by James Dewees except for Raining Blood, written by Slayer from their album Reign In Blood (1986).

No.	Title	Length
19.	"Lord of the Bling Trilogy: The Fellowship of the Bling (Featuring Hungary Bear)"	3:04
20.	"Lord of the Bling Trilogy: The Two Blings"	3:21
21.	"Lord of the Bling Trilogy: The Return of the Bling"	5:37
22.	"Your Girlfriends Hate Me (Free Moustache Rides Remix)"	2:33
23.	"Only With Me"	4:21
24.	"Raining Blood"	2:36
25.	"Everyone Is Crazy"	3:25

== Personnel ==
- James Dewees – drums, lead vocals, piano
- Matt Pryor – guitar, backing vocals
- Rob Pope – bass
- Ed Rose – Production, Mixing
