= Promotional Copy =

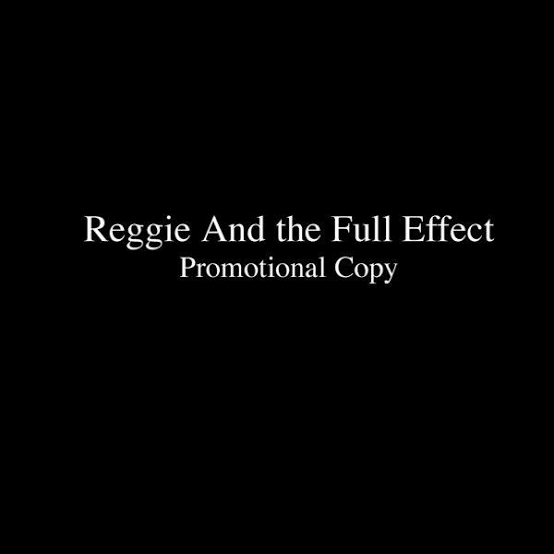

Studio album by Reggie and the Full Effect
- Released: April 25, 2000
- Recorded: 2000
- Genre: Emo, post-hardcore, pop punk
- Length: 33:37
- Label: Vagrant
- Producer: Ed Rose

Reggie and the Full Effect chronology
Greatest Hits 1984–1987 (1999)	Promotional Copy (2000)	Under the Tray (2003)

Professional ratings
Review scores
Source	Rating
AllMusic	4/5 stars
Ox-Fanzine	Favorable
Pitchfork	5.5/10

Promotional Copy is the second studio album by American rock band Reggie and the Full Effect.

== History ==
Promotional Copy was recorded and released in 2000. Produced by Ed Rose, it was the follow-up to the band's debut album Greatest Hits 1984-1987. Due to the misleading nature of the title, several retailers including Best Buy and Sam Goody sent back entire shipments of the album, because they believed that they were actually sent promotional copies of the album rather than the album itself.

== Track listing ==
All tracks are written by James Dewees.

Promotional Copy
No.	Title	Length
1.	"A.C. Lerok... Bitches Get Stitches"	1:30
2.	"From Me 2 U"	1:25
3.	"Congratulations Matt And Christine"	3:47
4.	"Something I'm Not (featuring Sean-O-Tronic)"	4:13
5.	"Doot Doot Pause Doot Doot"	0:49
6.	"Relive the Magic... Bring the Magic Home"	2:39
7.	"Good Times, Good Tunes, Good Buds"	1:33
8.	"Megan 2K"	2:21
9.	"Boot to the Moon (Wade and Wayne Jentry and Band)"	1:12
10.	"Thanx For Stayin'"	3:10
11.	"Gloves (featuring Fluxuation)"	3:12
12.	"Fought and Won One"	3:26
13.	"Ode to Mannheim Steamroller"	2:25
14.	"Dwarf Invasion (featuring Common Denominator)"	1:56

== Personnel ==
- Matt Pryor - guitar, backing vocals
- Rob Pope - bass
- James Dewees - drums, lead vocals, keyboards
- Ed Rose - Production, Mixing
