= Under the Tray =

Under The Tray...
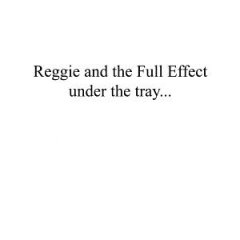

Studio album by Reggie and the Full Effect
- Released: February 18, 2003
- Recorded: 2002
- Genre: Pop punk, post-hardcore, emo
- Length: 37:54
- Label: Vagrant
- Producer: Ed Rose

Reggie and the Full Effect chronology
Promotional Copy (2000)	Under The Tray... (2003)	Songs Not to Get Married To (2005)

Alternative cover
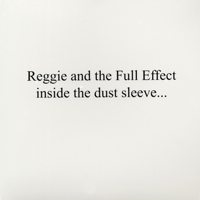
- Cover for the album's vinyl pressing Inside the Dust Sleeve

Professional ratings
Review scores
Source	Rating
Rolling Stone	3/5 stars
AllMusic	4/5 stars

Under the Tray..., also known as Inside the Dust Sleeve... (the former labeled on the CD release, the latter for vinyl) is the third studio album by American rock band Reggie and the Full Effect.

== Background ==
Under the Tray was written and recorded in the years following the band's previous release Promotional Copy, mostly while James Dewees was on tour with The Get Up Kids. The album was released on Vagrant Records in February 2003. The album sold rather well, reaching No. 15 on the Billboard Heatseekers chart and No. 8 on the Billboard Independent Albums chart. The song "Congratulations Smack and Katy" was featured in the video game Burnout 3: Takedown.

== Packaging ==
Under the Tray is named as such because the packaging contained an opaque black tray made to hold a CD. However, the discs were packed underneath the tray, giving the appearance upon opening that there was no disc in the package, prompting numerous complaints with retailers carrying the album. Later pressings included an illustration showing where the CD is.

The vinyl pressing of this album is titled Inside the Dust Sleeve...

== Track listing ==
All tracks are written by James Dewees.

Under the Tray
No.	Title	Length
1.	"Your Bleedin' Heart"	4:41
2.	"Drunk Girl at the Get Up Kids Show (Dicus Edit)"	0:16
3.	"Congratulations Smack and Katy"	2:28
4.	"Ain't Gettin' Paid to Dance"	0:14
5.	"Mood 4 LUV (feat. Fluxuation)"	3:31
6.	"What Won't Kill You Eats Gas"	3:37
7.	"Drunk Girl at the Get Up Kids Show (Tatoo'z, B-Day'z, Azz Beatin'z) (un-Dicused)"	0:19
8.	"Getting By With It"	3:49
9.	"Image is Nothing, Lobsters are Everything"	3:57
10.	"Apocalypse WOW! (feat. Hungary Bear)"	3:31
11.	"Drunk Girl at the Get Up Kids Show (Guess Jeans, Awnings, Old Navy) (un-Dicused)"	0:44
12.	"F.O.O.D. AKA Aren't You Hungary"	1:20
13.	"Happy V-Day"	3:57
14.	"Canadians Switching the Letter P for the Letter V, Eh?"	0:19
15.	"Linkin Verbz (feat. Common Denominator)"	1:36
16.	"Drunk Girl at the Get Up Kids Show (Drivin' and Cryin' or Broadway Cats Production) (Dicus Edit)"	0:16
17.	"Megan 2K2 (Even Though it's 2K3 Now)"	3:20

== Personnel ==
- James Dewees – vocals, keyboard, drums
- Matt Pryor – guitar, backup vocals
- Rob Pope – bass guitar
- Ed Rose – production, mixing

== Additional Personnel ==
- Andy Jackson – vocals on "Happy V-Day"

== Chart positions ==
Chart (2002)	Peak position
US Heatseekers	15
US Independent Albums	8
