= Stomachaches (album) =

Studio album by frnkiero andthe cellabration.
- Released: August 25, 2014
- Recorded: 2012–2014
- Studio: Belleville, New Jersey
- Genre: Alternative rock; indie rock; post-hardcore; punk rock
- Length: 37:26
- Label: Staple
- Producer: Frank Iero

frnkiero andthe cellabration. chronology
For Jamia (2012)	Stomachaches (2014)	Parachutes (2016)

Singles from Stomachaches
- 1. "Weighted" Released: August 4, 2014; 2. "Joyriding" Released: September 9, 2014; 3. "She's the Prettiest Girl at the Party, and She Can Prove It with a Solid Right Hook" Released: 2015

Stomachaches (stylized as .STOMACHACHES.) is the debut solo studio album by Frank Iero, rhythm guitarist and backing vocalist of the American rock band My Chemical Romance, released under the moniker of frnkiero andthe cellabration. It was officially announced in June 2014, and released on August 25, 2014 on Staple Records and B.CALM Press.

== Background ==
In late 2012, while dealing with painful digestive issues, Iero turned his basement office into a makeshift studio and began writing and recording music. After My Chemical Romance announced their disbandment on March 22, 2013, Iero continued to work on his solo material and eventually released a demo for the song "Joyriding", which he performed live at small venues along with "Stage 4 Fear of Trying". On June 16, 2014, Iero announced via his official website that he signed to Staple Records and would be releasing a full-length solo album entitled Stomachaches under the moniker of frnkiero andthe cellabration. On the record, Iero plays every instrument except for drums which were handled by former My Chemical Romance drummer Jarrod Alexander.

== Release ==
Stomachaches was released on August 26 in the U.S. The release was celebrated with a live performance at one of Iero's favorite music stores: Vintage Vinyl in Ford, New Jersey. Iero also assembled a touring band composed of Evan Nestor, Rob Hughes and Matt Olsson. On August 4, 2014 a music video for the album's first single, "Weighted" was released. "Weighted" was released to radio on August 11, 2014. In September and October, Iero supported Taking Back Sunday and the Used on their co-headlining US fall tour. In November, Iero supported Mallory Knox on their tour of the UK.

== Reception ==
Professional ratings
Review scores
Source	Rating
AllMusic	3.5/5 stars
AltSounds	80%
Kerrang!	4/5 stars
Rock Sound	7/10
Ultimate-Guitar	7.7/10

Rob Sayce from Rock Sound magazine describe the album as "Scrappy, idiosyncratic and infectious as hell, far removed from the well-oiled machine of latter-day My Chemical Romance, and all the more bracing for it." Timothy Monger from AllMusic said, "Passionate, and slightly unruly, the 12-song album deals with themes of yearning for acceptance and love, sung over a backdrop of compelling, often ramshackle punk and post-hardcore guitar rock." The album was included at number 40 on Rock Sound's "Top 50 Albums of the Year" list. The album was included at number 21 on Kerrang!'s "The Top 50 Rock Albums Of 2014" list.

== Track listing ==
All lyrics written by Frank Iero, all music composed by Frank Iero

No.	Title	Length
1.	"All I Want Is Nothing"	1:50
2.	"Weighted"	4:18
3.	"Blood Infections"	2:18
4.	"She's the Prettiest Girl at the Party, and She Can Prove It with a Solid Right Hook"	3:37
5.	"Stitches"	4:38
6.	"Joyriding"	2:20
7.	"Stage 4 Fear of Trying"	3:17
8.	"Tragician"	3:09
9.	"Neverenders"	1:58
10.	"Smoke Rings"	2:19
11.	"Guilttripping"	4:22
12.	"Where Do We Belong? Anywhere But Here"	3:20

== Personnel ==
- Frank Iero – vocals, guitars, bass guitar, drums (track 6), producer
- Jarrod Alexander – drums, percussion (all tracks except track 6)
- Evan Nestor – backing vocals (tracks 1 and 6 only), lead vocals (track 11 only)
- Ed Auletta – engineer

== Charts ==
Chart (2015)	Peak position
Dutch Albums (Album Top 100)	71
Irish Albums (IRMA)	100
UK Albums (Official Charts)	68

== Release history ==
Region	Date	Label	Format	Catalog
World wide	August 25, 2014	Vagrant	DL	—N/a
World wide	August 26, 2014	Hassle	CD	HOFF 180CDA
World wide	August 26, 2014	Hassle	LP	HOFF 180LP
