= Parachutes (Frank Iero and the Patience album) =

2016 album by Frank Iero and the Patience

Studio album by Frank Iero and the Patience
- Released: October 28, 2016
- Genres: Post hardcore; punk rock; emo
- Length: 43:23
- Label: Vagrant
- Producer: Ross Robinson

Frank Iero chronology
Stomachaches (2014)	Parachutes (2016)	Keep the Coffins Coming (2017)

Professional ratings
Aggregate scores
Source	Rating
Metacritic	86/100
Review scores
Source	Rating
AllMusic	3.5/5 stars
Alternative Press	4/5 stars
Kerrang!	5/5 stars
Rock Sound	7/10
Rolling Stone Australia	4/5 stars

Parachutes is the second solo studio album by guitarist and singer-songwriter Frank Iero and the first one with his backup band the Patience. It was released on October 28, 2016 via Vagrant Records with exclusive license to Hassle Records for the UK release. In February 2017, the band supported Taking Back Sunday on their tour of the UK.

== Track listing ==
No.	Title	Length
1.	"World Destroyer"	3:17
2.	"Veins! Veins!! Veins!!!"	2:50
3.	"I'm a Mess"	2:56
4.	"They Wanted Darkness..."	3:41
5.	"I'll Let You Down"	4:26
6.	"Remedy"	3:13
7.	"Dear Percocet, I Don't Think We Should See Each Other Anymore."	2:11
8.	"Miss Me"	3:08
9.	"Oceans"	4:25
10.	"The Resurrectionist, or An Existential Crisis in C♯"	4:26
11.	"Viva Indifference"	4:54
12.	"9-6-15"	3:56

== Personnel ==
Credits are adapted from the album's liner notes.

Frank Iero and the Patience

- Frank Iero – lead vocals, guitar
- Evan Nestor – guitar, backing vocals
- Steve Evetts – bass
- Matt Olsson – drums, backing vocals

Production and design

- Ross Robinson – producer
- Steve Evetts – engineer, mixing
- Alan Douches – mastering
- Angela Deanne – album art
- Randall Leddy – layout

== Charts ==
Chart (2016)	Peak position
Australia (ARIA)	62
