= L.S. Dunes =

American rock band

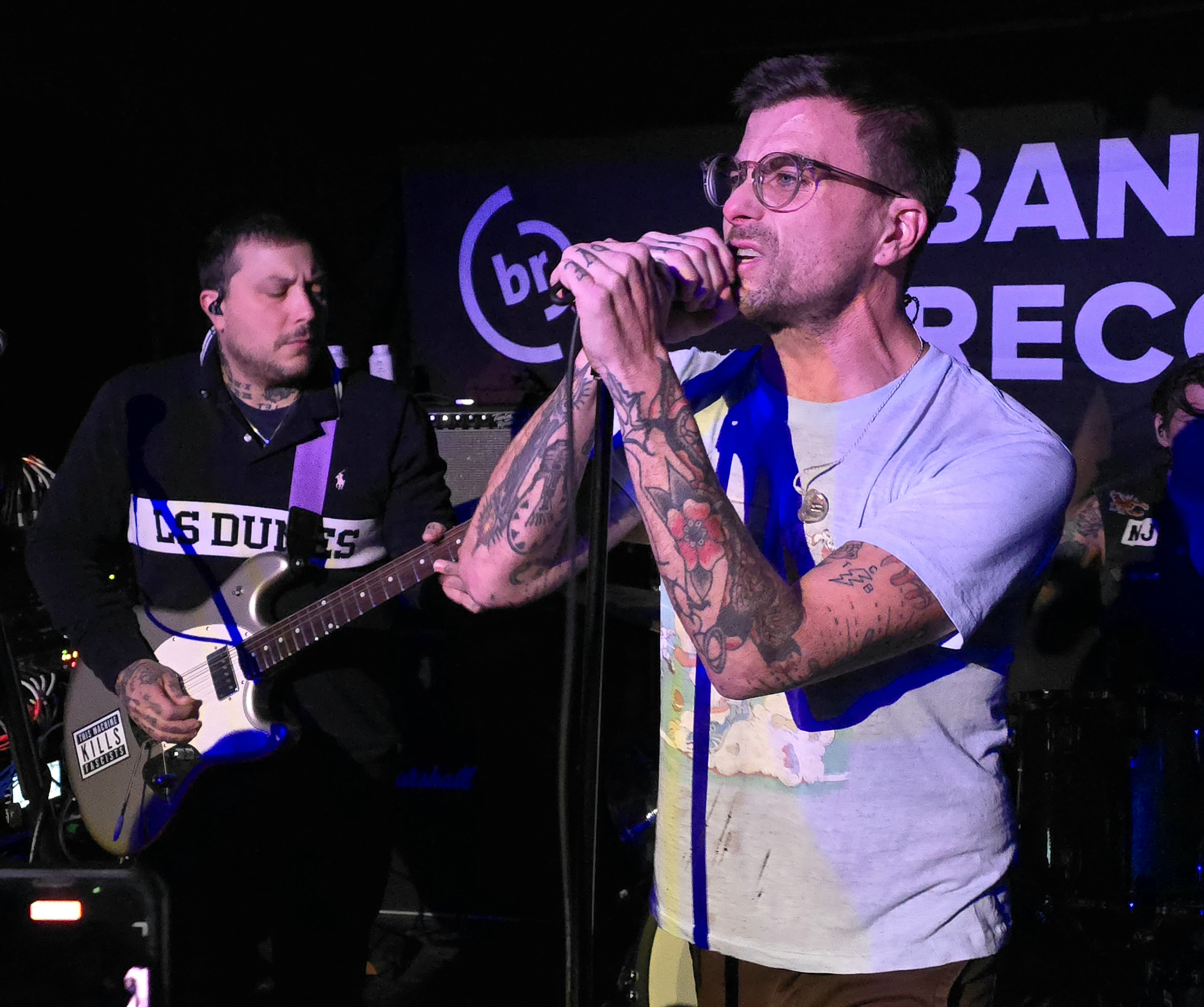
- L.S. Dunes playing at Fighting Cocks in 2025

Background information
- Origin: Chicago, Illinois, U.S.
- Genres: Post-hardcore; emo; rock; punk rock
- Years active: 2020–present
- Label: Fantasy
- Spinoff of: Thursday, My Chemical Romance, Circa Survive, Coheed and Cambria
- Members: Anthony Green; Frank Iero; Travis Stever; Tim Payne; Tucker Rule
- Website: lsdunes.com

L.S. Dunes is an American rock supergroup fronted by Circa Survive, Saosin, and the Sound of Animals Fighting vocalist Anthony Green, with My Chemical Romance guitarist Frank Iero, Coheed and Cambria guitarist Travis Stever, and bassist Tim Payne and drummer Tucker Rule from the band Thursday. They made their live debut at Riot Fest 2022 and released their debut album, Past Lives, on November 11, 2022, preceded by the singles "Permanent Rebellion", "2022" and "Bombsquad". The band played their first UK tour in January 2023, and their first US tour in July 2023.

== History ==
The band formed in 2020 during the COVID-19 pandemic as vocalist Anthony Green (frontman of Circa Survive, Saosin and the Sound of Animals Fighting) was looking for people to make music with. Originating from rehearsals for Thursday's 2020 holiday livestream, the project started with the working title Dad Bods. The other L.S. Dunes members individually recorded their parts for their debut album, Past Lives, before landing on a vocalist, and Thursday drummer Tucker Rule sent Green instrumental tracks, not initially revealing the group's lineup.

Word of the group first emerged when they appeared on the poster for Riot Fest in May 2022. My Chemical Romance guitarist Frank Iero unveiled the band with guitarist Travis Stever of Coheed and Cambria and Thursday's bassist Tim Payne. Coinciding with their unveiling, L.S. Dunes released their debut single, "Permanent Rebellion", the first single from Past Lives. It was released via Fantasy Records on August 26 with a music video, and drew praise from several music outlets. The group announced a series of North American tour dates from September 16 to November 30.

L.S. Dunes made their live debut at day one of Riot Fest 2022 at Douglass Park, Chicago, Illinois, on September 16 – where My Chemical Romance also happened to be headlining – playing six songs from Past Lives. After debuting the song at Riot Fest, they released the opening track of Past Lives, "2022", as their second single. The song was released alongside a psychedelic video.

In October 2022, the band announced details of their first UK tour. They are set to play across four cities in January 2023 alongside yet-to-be-announced special guests, in celebration of the release of Past Lives. On October 21, L.S. Dunes released the third single from Past Lives, "Bombsquad", which was also debuted at their Riot Fest set. Released with an accompanying live video, the track came from a poem Green wrote "around the time" of the January 6 United States Capitol attack.

On June 23, 2023, L.S. Dunes returned with the single "Benadryl Subreddit". The song's title came from a conversation between Iero and Mikey Way of My Chemical Romance about legal ways of getting high. Its video was directed, shot, and edited by Nick and Pat Demarais and produced by Cheers Dude Productions. Later that year, they released "Old Wounds". The release was received with some flack from fans after the music video was released, having been entirely AI-generated.

In May 2024, the band confirmed that a second full-length album has been recorded. On September 20, the band released the single Fatal Deluxe. Their second album, Violet, was released on January 31, 2025.

== Members ==
- Anthony Green – vocals
- Frank Iero – guitar
- Travis Stever – guitar
- Tim Payne – bass guitar
- Tucker Rule – drums

Touring-substitutes

- Marfred Rodriguez-Lopez – bass guitar (2023, substituted for Tim Payne)
- Steven Battelle (LostAlone) – guitar (2024, substituted for Frank Iero)
- Evan Nestor – guitar (2025, substituted for Travis Stever)

== Discography ==
=== Studio albums ===
List of studio albums, with selected details and chart positions
Title	Album details	Peak chart positions			
Title	Album details	US	SCO	UK Dig.	UK Rock
Past Lives	Released: November 11, 2022; Label: Fantasy; Formats: Vinyl, CD, Cassette, digital download, streaming	174	21	59	5
Violet	Released: January 31, 2025; Label: Fantasy; Formats: Vinyl, CD, Cassette, digital download, streaming	-	-	-	3

=== Demo albums ===
List of demo albums, with selected details and chart positions
Title	Album details
Lost Songs: Lines and Shapes	Released: November 10, 2023; Label: Fantasy

=== Singles ===
List of singles
Title	Year	Album	Notes
"Permanent Rebellion"	2022	Past Lives	Also released together as a limited edition cassette
"2022"	2022	Past Lives	Also released together as a limited edition cassette
"Bombsquad"	2022	Past Lives	Released alongside a live video recorded at Dreamland Studios in Hurley, New York
"Benadryl Subreddit"	2023	N/A	
"Old Wounds"	2023	N/A	
"Permanent Rebellion (Demo)"	2023	Lost Songs: Lines and Shapes	
"Old Wounds (Demo)"	2023	TBA	
"How Dare You"	2024	N/A	
"Fatal Deluxe"	2024	Violet	
"Machines"	2024	Violet	
"Paper Tigers"	2024	Violet	
"Violet"	2025	Violet	
