= Frank Iero =

American musician (born 1981)

- Iero in 2026
- Born: Frank Anthony Iero Jr. October 31, 1981 (age 45); Belleville, New Jersey, U.S.
- Occupations: Singer; songwriter
- Years active: 1997–present
- Spouse: Jamia Nestor (m. 2007)
- Children: 3
- Musical career
- Genres: Alternative rock; pop-punk; post-hardcore; emo; hardcore punk; punk rock
- Instruments: Guitar; bass; vocals
- Member of: My Chemical Romance; L.S. Dunes
- Formerly of: Pencey Prep; Leathermouth; Reggie and the Full Effect; Death Spells
- Website: frank-iero.com

Frank Anthony Iero Jr. (/aɪˈɪə.roʊ/ EYE-EAR-OH;, born October 31, 1981) is an American musician, singer, songwriter, and record producer, best known as the rhythm guitarist and backing vocalist of the rock band My Chemical Romance and as a guitarist in the supergroup L.S. Dunes. He was also the lead vocalist of the post-hardcore band Leathermouth. He has a solo project titled Frank Iero and the Future Violents (formerly frnkiero and the cellabration and Frank Iero and the Patience). He released his debut solo studio album titled Stomachaches on August 26, 2014.

== Early life ==
Iero was born in Belleville, New Jersey, on October 31, 1981. He attended Queen of Peace High School. He went to Rutgers University on a scholarship but dropped out during his final year to go on tour with My Chemical Romance.

Iero's parents split when he was young and he grew up living with his mother, who lent out her basement to her son's many band practices; his father and grandfather were musicians and both were big influences on Iero when he was young. His father had taught him to play drums but Iero later began playing the guitar.

== Music career ==
=== Early bands and Pencey Prep (1997–2002) ===
Iero started playing in local bands on the New Jersey punk scene at age 11. Before joining My Chemical Romance he served as frontman for the punk band Pencey Prep. The band released an album, Heartbreak in Stereo, on the independent Eyeball Records before disbanding. Whilst playing with Pencey Prep he became friends with Gerard Way and the other My Chemical Romance members, becoming a fan of their original demo and helping them get their first shows. After his band broke up Iero played in several bands including I Am A Graveyard, Hybrid, and Sector 12 before being offered the slot of rhythm guitar in My Chemical Romance.

=== My Chemical Romance (2002–2013) ===
Iero joined My Chemical Romance in 2002 and was featured on two tracks, "Honey, This Mirror Isn't Big Enough for the Two of Us", and "Early Sunsets Over Monroeville", on their debut album I Brought You My Bullets, You Brought Me Your Love. Iero performed on the band's second studio album, Three Cheers for Sweet Revenge, released on June 8, 2004. My Chemical Romance released their third studio album, The Black Parade, on October 23, 2006. My Chemical Romance's fourth studio album, Danger Days: The True Lives of the Fabulous Killjoys, was released on November 22, 2010. The band announced their breakup on March 22, 2013.

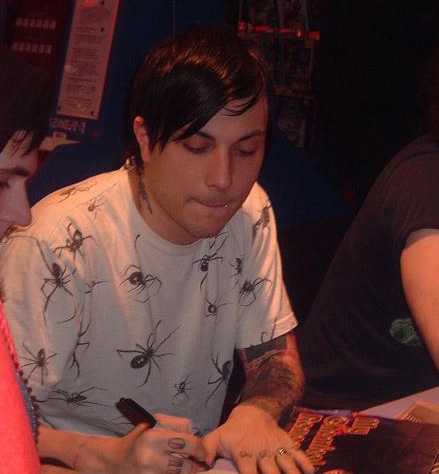
Iero signing autographs at a Meet And Greet in December 2006

=== Leathermouth and side projects (2007–2016) ===
Iero fronted the hardcore punk quintet Leathermouth, who released their debut album XO in January 2009 on Epitaph Records. The band split later in 2010. He is involved in a tribute band to the Cure named the Love Cats, after the song of the same name, and played bass with Reggie and the Full Effect on their farewell tour. His first solo song "This Song Is A Curse"' was released as a bonus track on the official soundtrack to the Tim Burton film Frankenweenie. He later posted an anti-Xmas track he recorded as a joke in 15 minutes and followed that up with a cover of the song 'Be My Baby', originally made famous by the Ronettes.

On December 7, 2010, Iero left the record company Skeleton Crew that he and his wife had co-founded in order to concentrate on his family and his music with My Chemical Romance, stating that although he would have loved to carry on, he could not juggle his career with the band, the new additions to his family (newborn daughters), and co-running a business. He was a judge for the 7th annual Independent Music Awards to support independent artists.

In early 2013 Iero and James Dewees announced that they were working on a new project, a digital hardcore act called Death Spells. They also announced a tour supporting Mindless Self Indulgence and a performance at the Skate and Surf Festival in New Jersey. Starting a week before the Mindless Self Indulgence tour Death Spells posted a short demo of a new song each night at midnight, culminating this with their first full single Where Are My Fucking Pills? and an accompanying music video. A full-length album was expected to be released in late 2013 but was delayed until 2016, when their album Nothing Above, Nothing Below was released on July 29 of that year.

During Death Spells' initial inactivity in 2013, Iero performed new solo songs live and posted others to his SoundCloud, then implied he had a full album worth of songs wrote with more content being created on a continuous basis. This was confirmed to be for a solo album.

=== Solo career (2013–present) ===
On November 28, 2013 he announced via his official website and his Twitter account that a two-track release entitled "For Jamia..." would be released digitally and via limited vinyl on December 10. After his former band broke up Iero began writing songs in his home studio. Throughout the rest of 2013 he started playing a couple of songs live at events, posted a demo of "joyriding", and recorded a full-length album. Iero plays everything on the album except for drums which were handled by former My Chemical Romance drummer Jarrod Alexander. He also assembled a touring band composed of Evan Nestor, Rob Hughes and Matt Olsson. In June 2014 he announced his signing to Staples Records and his debut album called Stomachaches due out August 25, under the moniker frnkiero andthe cellabration. This was followed up with tour dates (a support slot on the Taking Back Sunday and the Used co-headline US fall tour) and a debut single called "Weighted". On August 4, 2014 he released the music video for this song. A second single and accompanying video for the song "Joyriding" was released. The band opened for Mallory Knox in the UK in November 2014 on their first overseas run. The band announced headline dates for 2015 in Mexico, the US, and Europe and played the Reading and Leeds festivals of that year. The band also opened for Against Me! in the US on a summer tour and ended the year on a headline run.

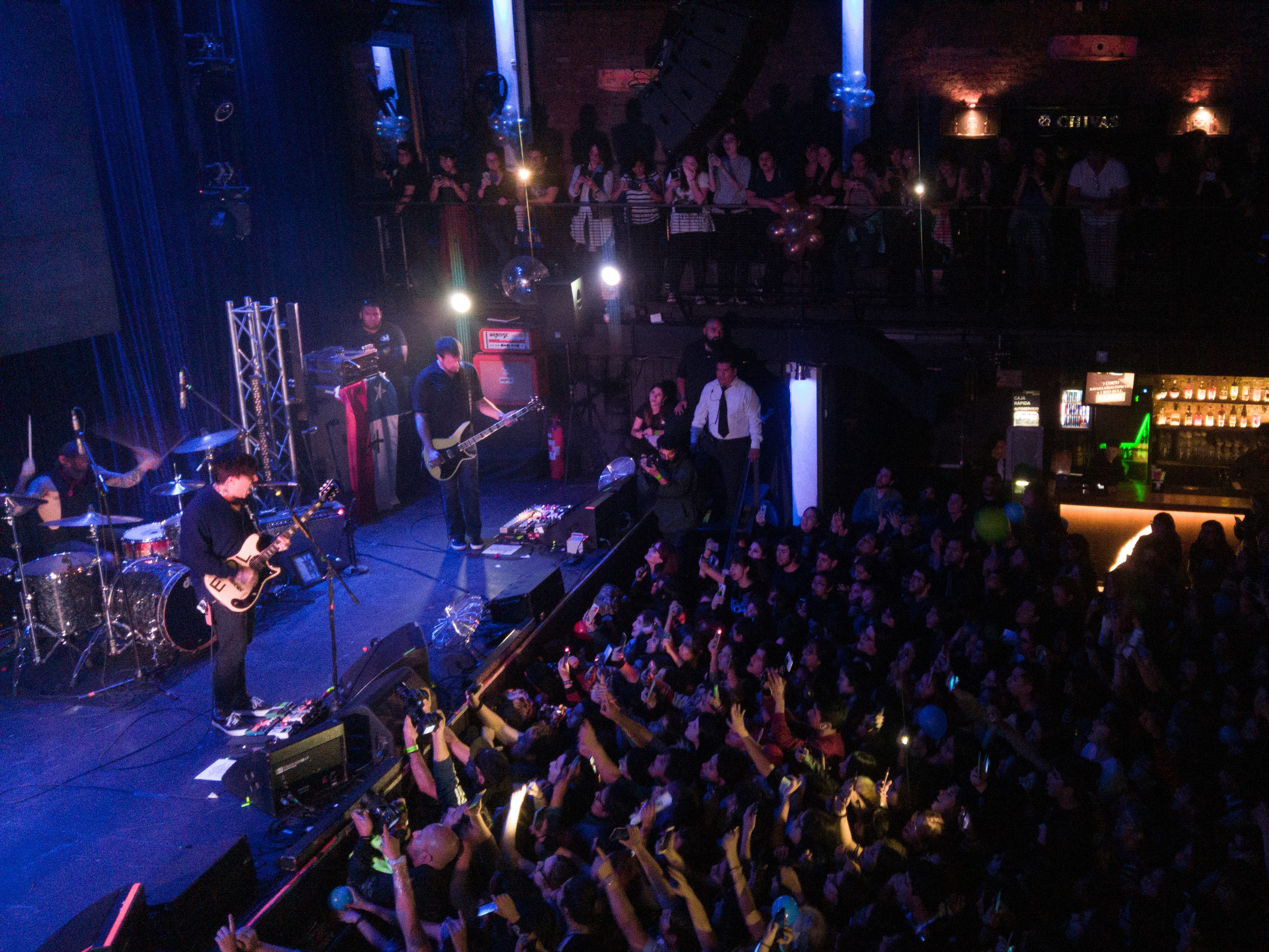
Frank Iero and the Future Violents performing in Chile, as part of their Southamerican Tour 2019

They performed two acoustic shows in New Jersey showcasing new material and announced that they were going into a studio to record a second album in two weeks. On May 22, 2016 they officially announced recording a new album and an Australian tour, with a name change to the band, to be then known as Frank Iero and the Patience. The band performed at Shadow of the City with the 1975 in New Jersey and played both Riot Fest dates (Denver and Chicago) in September 2016. After a motor vehicle accident that injured Iero and his bandmates, all remaining 2016 dates were canceled. Iero released his second studio album, titled Parachutes on October 28 and returned to touring during 2017.

On December 31, 2018 Iero announced his new solo moniker Frank Iero and the Future Violents. He released his third solo studio album, Barriers, under the new moniker on May 31, 2019. Loudwire named it one of the 50 best rock albums of 2019.

In August 2024, Iero announced and subsequently released XNauseousX, a deluxe version of his album Stomachaches to commemorate its ten-year anniversary.

=== My Chemical Romance Reunion (2019–present) ===
On October 31, 2019, My Chemical Romance announced they would be reuniting with a date in Los Angeles on December 20 and a new merchandise line. They announced that they would also be playing shows in Australia, New Zealand, and Japan in 2020. The tour was later postponed to 2022, due to the COVID-19 pandemic. The last concert of the tour took place on March 26, 2023, in Osaka, Japan.

The band returned to headline the When We Were Young Festival in October 2024. Shortly after, in November 2024, My Chemical Romance announced Long Live The Black Parade Tour. Opening on July 11, 2025, in Seattle Washington, the band toured until September 20, 2025, where they wrapped up their first leg of the tour in Atlanta at the Shaky Knees festival.

== Personal life and political views ==
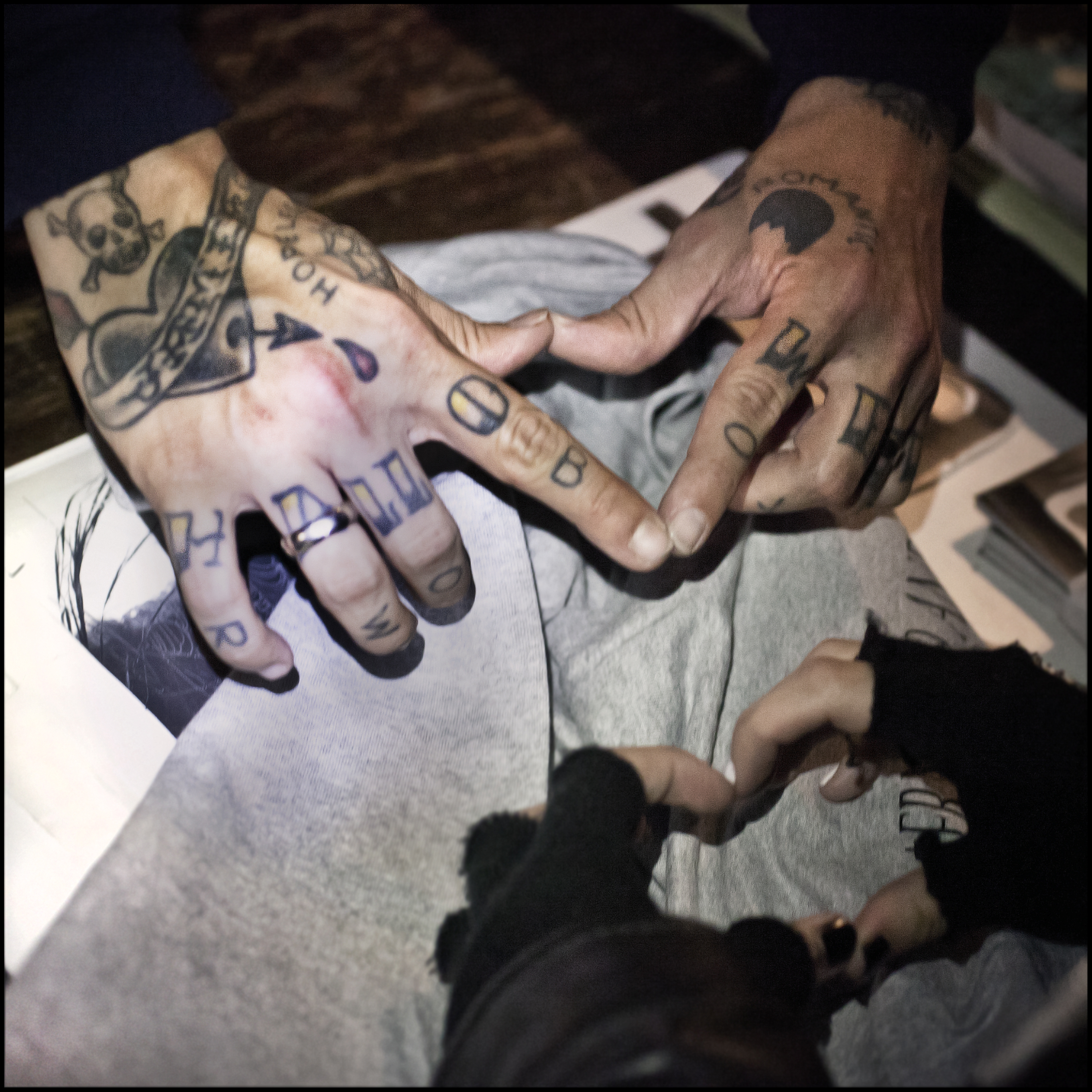
Frank Iero shows his hand tattoos to a fan.

Iero has many tattoos including logos for the bands Black Flag and The Misfits, symbols of his love for his home state, New Jersey, a matching "revenge" tattoo with James Dewees, and others by celebrity tattoo artist Kat Von D: a Frankenstein's monster and portraits of his grandmothers and grandfather, all of which were featured in Von D's book High Voltage Tattoo and the latter of which was done on an episode of her reality show LA Ink in which Iero was featured. Others among Iero's best-known tattoos include the words 'BOOKWORM' and 'HALLOWEEN' across his knuckles.

On February 5, 2007, Iero married his long-term girlfriend Jamia Nestor after proposing on May 25, 2006, during the recording of The Black Parade. On September 7, 2010, Iero announced on the My Chemical Romance official website that he and his wife Jamia had become parents of twin girls. On April 6, 2012, he announced via his official Twitter account that his wife had given birth to their son.

On October 13, 2016, Iero was injured in a motor vehicle accident. As he and his band unloaded their van for a show in Sydney, Australia, a passenger bus with no passengers hit them. Iero was dragged about 10 feet along the curb by the bus and credits "an enormous rucksack" for saving his life that day. He canceled all remaining 2016 shows and would later speak about that day saying, "It's incredible to me that we're all still alive. No one that witnessed the accident thought that we would be."

In response to Donald Trump winning the United States presidential election of 2016 Iero tweeted, "I feel sad and ashamed. This morning, all I could say to my kids when they woke up was 'I'm so sorry.'"

In 2019, Iero shared in an interview with Hysteria magazine that he experiences synesthesia, adding that “It’s very hard to explain because I don’t know why I feel that way or why I see it that way. I just know what it feels like when I write it.”

He is a supporter of Liverpool F.C.

== Discography ==
As frnkiero and the cellabration

- Stomachaches (2014)
- Stomachaches -- XNauseousX (Deluxe Anniversary Edition) (2024)

As Frank Iero and the Patience

- Parachutes (2016)
- Keep The Coffins Coming EP (2017)

As Frank Iero and the Future Violents

- Barriers (2019)
- Heaven Is a Place, This Is a Place EP (2021)

Solo

- "This Song Is a Curse" (2012)
- For Jamia (2012)
- "B.F.F." (2014)
- "Extraordinary Girl" cover for Kerrang Does American Idiot (2014)

With Pencey Prep

- Heartbreak in Stereo (2001)

With Reggie and the Full Effect

- No Country for Old Musicians (2013)

With My Chemical Romance

Main articles: My Chemical Romance discography and List of songs recorded by My Chemical Romance
- I Brought You My Bullets, You Brought Me Your Love (2002)
- Three Cheers for Sweet Revenge (2004)
- The Black Parade (2006)
- Danger Days: The True Lives of the Fabulous Killjoys (2010)

With Leathermouth

- XO (2009)

With Death Spells

- Nothing Above, Nothing Below (2016)

With L.S. Dunes

- Past Lives (2022)
- Violet (2025)
