= Past Lives (L.S. Dunes album) =

- Standard cover

Studio album by L.S. Dunes
- Released: November 11, 2022
- Studio: Studio 4 Recording (Philadelphia)
- Genre: Post-hardcore; emo
- Length: 43:21
- Label: Fantasy
- Producer: L.S. Dunes; Will Yip

L.S. Dunes chronology
Past Lives (2022)	Lost Songs: Lines and Shapes (2023)

Singles from Past Lives
- 1. "Permanent Rebellion" Released: August 26, 2022; 2. "2022" Released: September 23, 2022; 3. "Bombsquad" Released: October 21, 2022

Past Lives is the debut studio album by American supergroup L.S. Dunes. It was released on November 11, 2022 by Fantasy Records and distributed through Concord. Three singles preceded the album's release: "Permanent Rebellion", "2022", and "Bombsquad".

== Background and recording ==
The seeds for L.S. Dunes were sown during rehearsals for Thursday's 2020 Christmas livestream, where guitarists Frank Iero and Travis Stever engaged in "serendipitous, impromptu jam sessions" alongside Thursday bassist Tim Payne and drummer Tucker Rule, where they had an "instantaneous" chemistry. Although there weren't originally plans for an album, the members of L.S. Dunes continued writing songs and convened in person for the first time in mid-2021, with time booked to record at the end of that year.

The band had fully formed and individually recorded their parts on Past Lives before landing on Anthony Green as a vocalist, who wasn't aware who was in the group when he began recording vocals. Past Lives was produced by Will Yip who tracked the band at his Studio 4 Recording space in Philadelphia. A month before studio time in September, Iero slipped from a ladder and broke his wrist which delayed the session to December.

== Composition ==
Past Lives is a post-hardcore and emo album. The album opens with "2022", a track which originally appeared on Green's solo album Boom. Done. (2022) but was removed from digital versions of the album. It is a "somber" and "hypnotic" song. The song has been described by Green as "the most fucked-up" and "personal" he ever wrote. "Antibodies" (Note: Referred to as "Antidotes" by Dork.) is a "frenetic" and "driving" track, which was the first they had completed work on. "Grey Veins" is a "masterful" emo composition with a "massive" chorus, high vocals and "thundering" drums. "Like Forever" features "bouncy, intricate" guitarwork by Stever, while "Blender" has a prominent bassline.

The album's title track has Green howl the lyric "I'm not all my mistakes, no matter what they say about it...". "It Takes Time" is a "powerful" song, while "Bombsquad" features "garotte-sharp" political observations inspired by Green's disgust with Donald Trump and the January 6 U.S. Capitol attack. "Grifter" is a "chaotic" song, while "Permanent Rebellion" is a "blast" of punk rock with "soaring" guitar work. The album's closer, "Sleep Cult", pays homage to 1950s doo-wop.

== Singles and promotion ==
To coincide with the band's formal unveiling, the album was made available for pre-order and its cover art and track listing was announced, along with the release of "Permanent Rebellion" and its accompanying music video as the album's lead single on August 26, 2022. "2022 was released as the second single on September 23, 2022. "Bombsquad" was released as the third single on October 21, 2022, alongside a live video of a performance at Dreamland Studios in Woodstock, New York.

Past Lives was released on November 11, 2022 by Fantasy Records and distributed through Concord. To support the album's release, YouTube Music advertised Past Lives on the Nashville Sign billboard.

== Critical reception ==
Professional ratings
Aggregate scores
Source	Rating
Metacritic	74/100
Review scores
Source	Rating
AllMusic	3.5/5 stars
Clash	8/10
Dork	4/5 stars
Kerrang!	4/5 stars
The Line of Best Fit	6/10
New Noise	5/5 stars
Sputnikmusic	3.8/5 stars
Wall of Sound	9/10

Past Lives received positive reviews from music critics. At Metacritic, which assigns a weighted mean rating out of 100 to reviews from mainstream critics, the album received an average score of 74, based on six reviews. BrooklynVegan's Andrew Sacher opined that the album "exceeds expectations" for a supergroup, characterizing it as "personal, impactful music". Sam Law of Kerrang! thought the tracks contained "flickers of familiarity" that were "in service of breaking new ground". Writing for Dork, Rob Mair praised Green's "typically powerful performance" but criticized the songs "Blender" and "2022" for being more "pedestrian" than others.

== Track listing ==
All tracks are written by L.S. Dunes.

Past Lives track listing
No.	Title	Length
1.	"2022"	4:30
2.	"Antibodies"	3:29
3.	"Grey Veins"	4:26
4.	"Like Forever"	3:20
5.	"Blender"	4:29
6.	"Past Lives"	4:10
7.	"It Takes Time"	3:26
8.	"Bombsquad"	3:51
9.	"Grifter"	4:42
10.	"Permanent Rebellion"	3:13
11.	"Sleep Cult"	3:45
Total length:		43:21

== Personnel ==
L.S. Dunes

- Tim Payne – bass guitar
- Tucker Rule – drums
- Frank Iero – guitar
- Travis Stever – guitar
- Anthony Green – vocals

Studio personnel

- Will Yip – production, recording production, mixing, record engineering
- Anneliese Parenti – engineering
- Justin Bartlett – engineering
- Ryan Smith – master engineering
- Vince Ratti – mixing

Associated performers

- L.S. Dunes – production, recording production
- Billy Perez – music production

== Charts ==
Chart performance for Past Lives
Chart (2022)	Peak position
Australian Digital Albums (ARIA)	44
Scottish Albums (OCC)	21
UK Album Downloads (OCC)	59
UK Rock & Metal Albums (OCC)	5
US Billboard 200	174
