= Reggie and the Full Effect =

American rock band

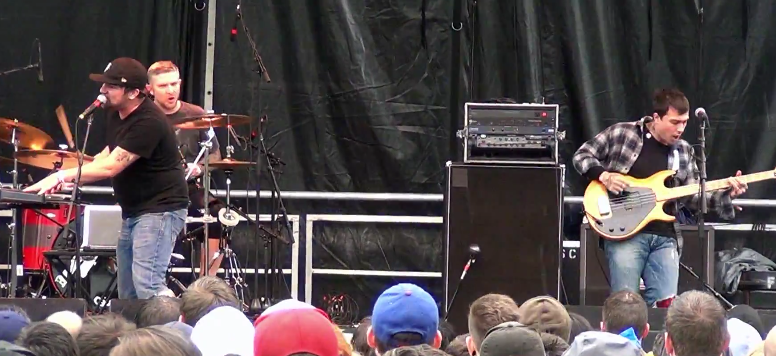
- Reggie and the Full Effect at Riot Fest 2013

Background information
- Also known as: Common Denominator, Fluxuation
- Origin: Kansas City, Missouri, U.S.
- Genres: Alternative rock; pop-punk; post-hardcore; emo
- Years active: 1998–2008, 2010, 2013–present
- Labels: Second Nature, Vagrant, Pure Noise
- Members: James Dewees; Jeramiah Pauly; Lance Claypool; Vincent Caito; Jarrod Rose
- Past members: Matt Pryor; Rob Pope; Ryan Pope; Paul Gray; Frank Iero; Cory White; Ray Toro; Billy Johnson; Rich Gaccione

Reggie and the Full Effect is an American rock band, the solo project of James Dewees, the former keyboardist for The Get Up Kids. It has released seven full-length albums, the latest in 2018, and has toured with various associated acts in their promotion.

== History ==
=== Early years (1998–2004) ===
In the mid-1990s when he was playing with Coalesce, Dewees recorded four songs on a cassette tape as a joke, and would hand them out at concerts. After Matt Pryor received one, he urged Dewees to contact Ed Rose to record the material. With Pryor's help, Dewees recorded and released Reggie and the Full Effect's first album, Greatest Hits 1984–1987, on Second Nature Recordings in 1999.

In April 2000, Reggie released their second full-length, Promotional Copy, on Vagrant Records. The album caused much confusion in stores because of the album art, which is styled in the same manner as a promotional recording which is not intended to be sold. A similar joke fell flat when Under the Tray was released in February 18, 2003. When the CD case was opened, buyers were shocked to find that there was no disc waiting for them in its usual resting place. Instead, the disc had been placed under the tray (hence the album title). On subsequent pressings, Vagrant added an illustration to show purchasers where to find the CD. This album contained the single "Congratulations Smack and Katy", which would be the tune behind Reggie's first music video and appear in the video game Burnout 3: Takedown.

=== Songs Not to Get Married To (2005–2006) ===
Reggie's fourth studio album, Songs Not to Get Married To, was released on March 29, 2005. Most of the music from this album was inspired by the divorce Dewees went through with his first wife, Megan. Sean Ingram of Coalesce and ex-From Autumn to Ashes lead singer Ben Perri both appear on the album, as well as The Get Up Kids bandmates Rob Pope and Ryan Pope.

The album contained three singles, the most of any Reggie album to date. The lead single was for the song "Get Well Soon", and included a video chronicling the Loch Ness Monster struggling with a divorce, mirroring the album's themes. "Get Well Soon" is featured in the 2006 video game Saints Row. The second single was for "Take Me Home, Please". A music video was released, although it did not receive the push that "Get Well Soon" did. Reggie also released a music video for "Love Reality", a song by Dewees' alter-ego, Fluxuation. This remains the only music video that the band has released for a non-Reggie persona.

After the album's release, Dewees embarked on an extensive tour to promote the album, including stints with Alkaline Trio, My Chemical Romance and Hellogoodbye.

=== Last Stop: Crappy Town and farewell tour (2006–2008) ===
Reggie and the Full Effect dropped off of the Warped Tour in the summer of 2006 to record a follow-up to Songs Not to Get Married To with producer Sean Beavan. It was confirmed by a MySpace bulletin that Reggie would release the song "F Train" from his new album exclusively for 24 hours on his MySpace profile on October 31, 2006. The song is much heavier than his other releases, and is very reminiscent of Dewees' former band, Coalesce.

In July 2007, speculation of Reggie coming to an end began through a message posted on his MySpace page. Later, Dewees posted a message that they had not broken up. However, soon afterward the official Reggie and the Full Effect MySpace page was taken down.

On April 8, 2008, Alternative Press announced that they had received details on the new album from Reggie and the Full Effect. The 12-song album is called Last Stop: Crappy Town and was produced by Sean Beavan. The album was initially shelved by Vagrant Records for being "too heavy" and distant from Reggie records of the past. A concept album about Dewees' drug addiction and subsequent rehab, it was originally to be self-titled Reggie and the Full Effect. The original concept had 15 tracks that formed one solid piece of music, each track flowing seamlessly from the last. After a year and a half, Vagrant put the album in the hands of a new mixer, removed 3 tracks and released Last Stop: Crappy Town on June 17, 2008. In mid-April 2008, the band's MySpace page was reactivated. On August 27, 2008, the band announced via MySpace the release of a B-side entitled "Shit Sandwich" available for free download.

It was announced via MySpace that the band would be doing their final tour from August 20 to September 14, 2008, with Leathermouth. However, in an interview with Lawrence.com on June 30, 2008, Dewees made comments about his disappointment that the band would not be touring through his hometown of Kansas City, Missouri, and that he hoped they could play shows there on future tours. This brought into question whether or not this would be the last for the band. At shows on this tour, Dewees announced that the 'Final Tour' thing was just a joke and a ploy to get more people to show up.

He also spoke about fan reaction to the more serious tone of the album saying that "Reggie fans feel betrayed that there are no Common Denominator and no Fluxuation songs on this record. It's like, shit wasn't very fun and happy – it was actually pretty fucking spooky and serious. I can't pretend that it didn't happen ... It took time, and now that I feel comfortable getting back to being a silly jackass, cool."

In that same interview, Dewees confirmed that he is currently writing a full album for his British electropop alter-ego "Fluxuation", one that had been rumored for some time. Dewees had performed 2 half done songs at some of the last tour dates. However, he has not mentioned a release for his other pseudonym, "Common Denominator".

At the end of the Farewell Tour, Dewees said, in the September 8, 2008 interview with Mishmash Magazine, that he will be "jumping right back into things" musically. Though he has not disclosed details of his plans, he did say that they involve "an old band from the '90s and early 2000s." The musical plans Dewees has announced were rumored to be a reunion of his former band The Get Up Kids, and these rumors about their reunion were confirmed by the band on November 13, 2008, and the band played their first show since 2005 on November 16, 2008 in Kansas City.

=== Post-"farewell tour" (2008–2013) ===
On November 3, 2010, for the first time since 2008, Dewees spoke about the band. He confirmed the band would reunite for a one-off New Year's Eve performance on December 31, 2010, at the Theatre of Living Arts in Philadelphia. Dewees confirmed that the show would include surprise guests, also being the band's only planned reunion performance, with no plans to reunite and perform again in the future, calling it a "mini reunion". During the show, the band debuted a new dance-pop-influenced song entitled "Someone Please Tell Mark's Vagina to Shut Up", which was sung by Dewees as Fluxuation.

It was announced in December 2012 that James Dewees and Matt Pryor would be doing a five-date tour in January 2013 on the East Coast. They plan to be playing Reggie and the Full Effect, The Get Up Kids, The New Amsterdams, and Pryor's solo material on this tour. In the lead-up to the tour, Pryor and Dewees did a weekly podcast called "Tuesdays With Reggie"; they discussed topics ranging from Dewees' drug addiction, rehab and the end of Reggie in 2008 to a potential sixth studio album, tentatively titled No Country for Old Musicians.

=== No Country For Old Musicians (2013–2014) ===
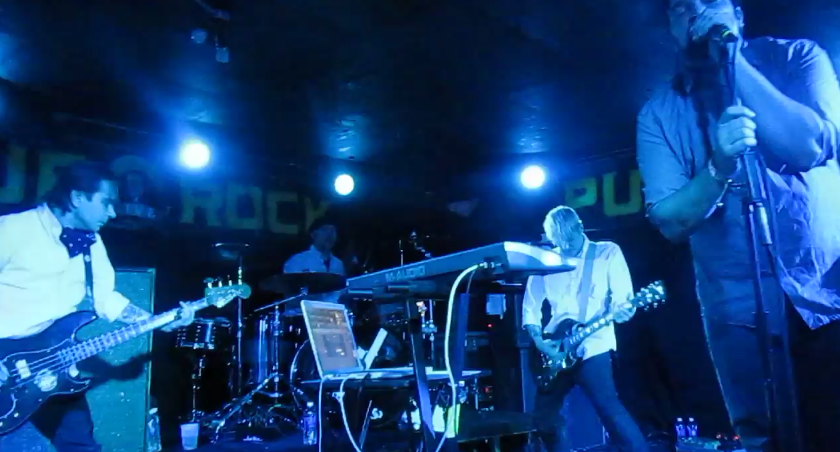
Reggie and the Full Effect Live in 2014

On March 13, 2013, Dewees launched a Kickstarter crowdfunding project to fund a new album, No Country for Old Musicians. The Kickstarter succeeded and Dewees recorded the album over the summer of 2013, releasing it on November 19, 2013 in conjunction with Pure Noise Records. The band played Riot Fest Chicago in September 2013, before embarking on a tour in early 2014 in support of the record. Opening acts on the tour included Buffalo, NY's Pentimento and Michigan's Dads.

=== Say Anything/Saves The Day/Reggie and The Full Effect Album Anniversaries Tour (2014) ===
On September 4, 2014, Alternative Press announced a tour featuring Say Anything, Saves the Day, and Reggie and The Full Effect. Say Anything would perform their debut full-length, ...Is A Real Boy, in full to celebrate its 10th anniversary. Saves The Day performed Through Being Cool in full for its 15th anniversary. Reggie and the Full Effect performed Under The Tray in full for its 11th anniversary. The tour was over 6 weeks and featured the members of Buffalo, NY's Pentimento as The Full Effect. The tour began November 14 in San Diego where up until the day after Thanksgiving, the band performed in pilgrim costumes with Dewees as a cooked turkey. Post-Thanksgiving, the band performed as elves with Dewees as Santa.

=== 41 (2017-present) ===
On December 6, 2017, Pure Noise announced the release of the seventh album by Reggie and the Full Effect, titled 41. The album was titled after Dewees' age at the time, and in conjunction with its cover, lampoons the motif of Adele's discography (particularly 21). Pure Noise also released the single, "The Horrible Year", as well as announcing a spring 2018 tour with Senses Fail. The album was released on February 23, 2018.

Former drummer Billy Johnson, who was a member of the band from 2006 to 2014, died on February 13, 2018.

== Format ==
Dewees plays nearly every instrument on Reggie and the Full Effect recordings, including bass guitar, drums, and keyboards. Each album also includes songs by alternate personas, acted out by Dewees in various styles. Fluxuation (who is reminiscent of artists from the new wave and New Romantic styles), and Common Denominator, a Finnish Metal band with more industrial learnings similar to that of Germany's Rammstein.

Reggie's lineup for live performances has always changed frequently, but often contained members of The Get Up Kids, Coalesce, The Esoteric, and My Chemical Romance – with whose projects Dewees has also collaborated. Other members of the live show have included musicians from the bands Hot Rod Circuit, The Anniversary, From Autumn to Ashes, Ultimate Fakebook, Morning Again, Poison the Well, Shots Fired, and Slipknot. The current live lineup includes 3 members of the band Pentimento. Many of these musicians have also contributed to the recording of various albums, including Matt Pryor, Rob Pope, & Ryan Pope of The Get Up Kids, Paul Gray of Slipknot, Cory White of Coalesce and The Esoteric, Frank Iero of My Chemical Romance and Jeramiah Pauly of Pentimento.

== Band members ==
Current members

- James Dewees – lead vocals, piano, keyboards, synthesizers (1998–present); drums (1998–2004)
- Lance Claypool – guitar (2014–present)
- Vincent Caito – bass (2014–present)
- Jeramiah Pauly – guitar, vocals (2014–present)
- Jarrod Rose – drums (2017–present)

Former members

- Matt Pryor – lead and rhythm guitar, co-lead vocals (1998–2004)
- Rob Pope – bass (1998–2006)
- Cory White – rhythm guitar, co-lead vocals (2004–2008, 2010, 2013–2014); lead guitar (2006–2008, 2010)
- Ryan Pope – drums (2004–2006)
- Stephen Looker – lead guitar (2004–2006)
- Billy Johnson – drums (2006–2008, 2010, 2013–2014; died 2018)
- Josh Newton – bass (2006–2007)
- Amanda Haase – keyboards, synthesizers (2006–2008)
- Paul Gray – bass (2007–2008; died 2010)
- Frank Iero – bass, co-lead vocals (2008, 2010, 2013–2014)
- Francis Mark – drums (2008)
- Zach Phillips – bass (2013–2014)
- Ray Toro – lead guitar, backing vocals (2013–2014)
- Michael Hansen – drums (2014-2017)

== Discography ==
Year	Album	Label	Release date
1999	Greatest Hits 1984–1987	Second Nature Recordings	April 20, 1999
2000	Promotional Copy	Vagrant Records	April 25, 2000
2003	Under the Tray	Vagrant Records	February 18, 2003
2005	Songs Not to Get Married To	Vagrant Records	March 29, 2005
2008	Last Stop: Crappy Town	Vagrant Records	June 17, 2008
2013	No Country for Old Musicians	Pure Noise Records	November 19, 2013
2018	41	Pure Noise Records	February 23, 2018
