= Leathermouth =

American post-hardcore band (2007–2012, 2013)

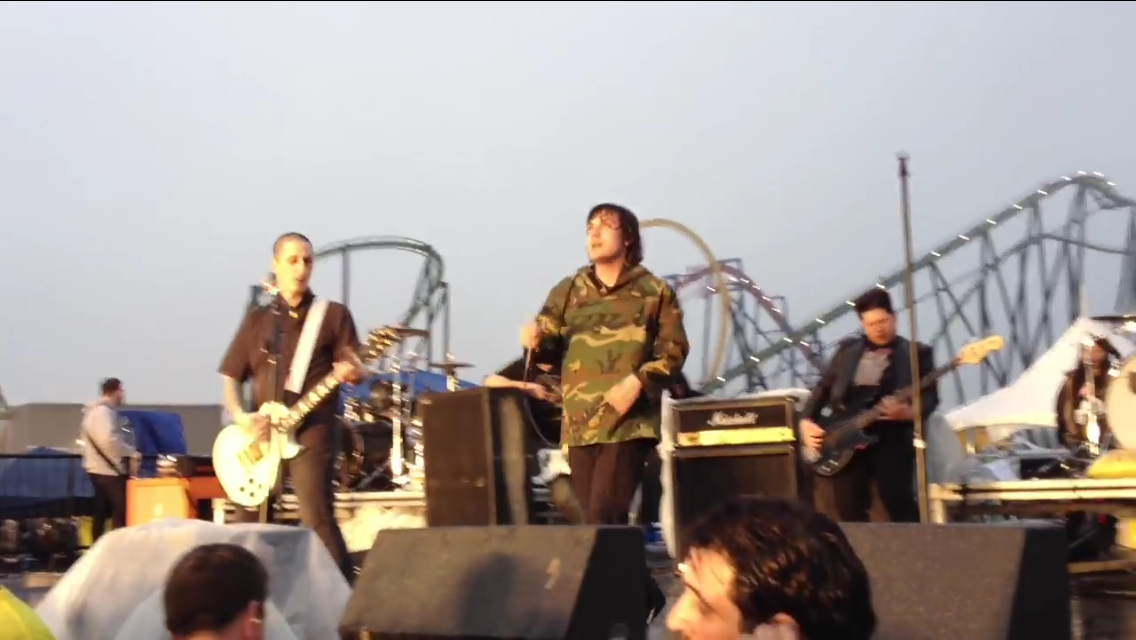
- Leathermouth performing in 2013. From left to right: Ed Auletta, Frank Iero, and John McGuire

Background information
- Origin: New Jersey, United States
- Genre: Post-hardcore
- Years active: 2007–2012; 2013
- Label: Epitaph
- Spinoff of: My Chemical Romance
- Past members: Andrew Escobar; Vincent Averelli; Steve Oyola; Frank Iero; Rob Hughes; James Dewees; Ed Auletta
- Website: leathermouth.com

Leathermouth, sometimes stylized as LeATHERMØUTH, was an American post-hardcore band formed by Vinnie Avarali, Andrew Escobar, and Steve Oyola in New Jersey in 2007. Friends with My Chemical Romance's rhythm guitarist Frank Iero, they showed demos to him that they had written in 2006. Upon hearing these demos, Iero agreed to join the band. Avarali, Escobar, and Oyola departed shortly after its formation, and were replaced by Rob Hughes, Ed Auletta, John McGuire, and James Dewees.

Leathermouth started playing live shows in mid-2008, before signing to Epitaph Records in October that same year. In January 2009, they released their debut studio album, XO. It received "cautious reactions" from music critics according to journalist Tom Bryant, with Alternative Press describing it as "the complete anti–My Chem experience". In 2012, Iero announced Leathermouth had split after the band members found religion, and they decided they didn't want to be part of the band anymore. In 2013, they shortly reunited for a performance at New Jersey's Skate and Surf Festival, and in 2018, XO was re–released on vinyl.

== History ==
Leathermouth was formed in New Jersey in 2007 by Vinnie Avarali, Andrew Escobar, and Steve Oyola. Oyola departed from the band shortly after their formation, and was replaced by James Dewees of Coalesce and the Get Up Kids. The members were friends with My Chemical Romance's rhythm guitarist Frank Iero, who had heard a few demo tracks from the band that they had created in 2006 after Iero had finished touring with My Chemical Romance on their Black Parade World Tour (2007–2008). It was not until the previous lead singer had failed to write any lyrics that Iero became a member. Iero recalled that it was formed in a "very natural and organic way", mentioning in an interview with MTV News: "I was like, 'Wow, this is really good,' and from that second, I wanted to be a part of it somehow," He saw the project "a way to exorcise all the rage he could not directly deal with in [My Chemical Romance]". They cited influences such as Ink & Dagger, Unsane, Schoolyard Heroes, the Misfits, Rocket from the Crypt, Lifetime, Face to Face, Helmet, Black Flag, Motörhead, and the Bronx.

Soon, Avarali and Escobar left to create their own band, March of Saints; the line-up became Iero, Rob Hughes, Ed Auletta, John McGuire, and Dewees. Leathermouth played their first shows in mid-2008 alongside Warship and Reggie and the Full Effect. Iero hoped to tour with Leathermouth when he was not working with My Chemical Romance.

In October 2008, the band signed to Epitaph Records. Iero was especially enthusiastic about working with the label, writing: "I have a great deal of respect for Epitaph, and when I decided that I didn't want to release the Leathermouth record myself there was only one other label that I felt would be right for this project". Several demos that Leathermouth had recorded leaked online before they released their debut album. Soon after in December, they announced they would be releasing their debut studio album, XO, in January 2009. In the lead-up to the release, they posted the sixth track on XO, "Sunsets Are For Mugging", on the group's Myspace on January 8, 2009. The album was released on January 27 through Epitaph, and waws accompanied by a music video for "Bodysnatchers 4 Ever". It was intended to be released through Skeleton Crew, but Iero deemed it was "too much of a drain on his time". The album was described by Cory Apar of AllMusic as "throat-shredding hardcore influenced by Black Flag and Ink & Dagger". According to My Chemical Romance biographer Tom Bryant, XO received a "cautious reaction" from music critics. Alternative Press classified it as "the complete anti–My Chem experience", and Rolling Stone deemed it as "abrasive and confrontational". Nevertheless, the band went on tour in support of the album.

In an interview with Ultimate Guitar, Hughes stated that he "wanted Leathermouth to last as long as it can"; in 2012, Iero announced in an interview with Alternative Press that Leathermouth had silently broken up, stating: "I was originally brought into that band with the other guys. Then they found religion, then things got messed up between us. Not friendship-wise; they didn’t want to be a part of Leathermouth anymore. I guess they thought I’d taken it too far." The band briefly reunited in 2013 for a performance at New Jersey's Skate and Surf Festival, and in 2018, Iero announced XO would be re–released on vinyl, limited to 1,000 copies. Apar described the band as a "post-hardcore outfit", and Iero classified them as "just dirty rock and roll".

== Band members ==
Final line-up

- Frank Iero – lead vocals (2007–2012, 2013)
- Rob Hughes – lead guitar, backing vocals (2007–2012, 2013)
- Ed Auletta – rhythm guitar (2008–2012, 2013)
- John McGuire – bass, backing vocals (2008–2012, 2013)
- James Dewees – drums, percussion (2007–2012, 2013)

Former members

- Andrew Escobar – bass, backing vocals (2007)
- Vincent Averelli – rhythm guitar (2007)
- Steve Oyola – drums, percussion (2007)

== Discography ==
Studio albums

- XØ (2009)

Videography

- "Bodysnatchers 4 Ever" (2009)
